= 2017 CBR Brave season =

2017 CBR Brave
- League: 3rd AIHL
- 2017 record: 13–3–1–11
- Home record: 6–1–1–6
- Road record: 7–2–0–5
- Goals for: 130
- Goals against: 101

Team information
- Coach: (Australia) Robert Starke
- Assistant coach: (United States) David Rogina
- Captain: (Australia) Mark Rummukainen
- Alternate captains: (Czech Republic) Jan Safar (Australia) Jordan Gavin
- Arena: Phillip Ice Skating Centre

Team leaders
- Goals: (Canada) Stephen Blunden (24)
- Assists: (Canada) Dominic Jalbert (37)
- Points: (Canada) Geordie Wudrick (54)
- Penalty minutes: (Canada) Matt Buskas (90)
- Goals against average: (Australia) Aleksi Toivonen (4.10)

The 2017 CBR Brave season was the Brave's 4th season in the Australian Ice Hockey League since being founded and entering the league in 2014. The season ran from 22 April 2017 to 3 September 2017 for the Brave. CBR finished third in the regular season behind the Melbourne Ice and Perth Thunder. The Brave qualified for the AIHL Finals in Melbourne and played in semi-final two. Canberra defeated the Thunder 6–2 to qualify for the Goodall Cup Final for the second time in franchise history. The Brave were defeated in the final by the Ice 1–4, Canberra's second championship final loss in a row.

== News ==
Canberra appointed a new head coach, Rob Starke, in January 2017 ahead of the 2017 AIHL season. The appointment was the Starke's first coaching role since his retirement from playing in 2016.

The day after the end of the season, Brave all-time leading point scorer, Stephen Blunden, announced his departure from the team and return to Canada.

== Roster ==
Team roster for the 2017 AIHL season

2017 AIHL CBR Brave Roster
#	Nat	Name	Pos	S/G	Age	Acquired	Birthplace
42	(Australia)	Brian Bales	C	L	41	2017	Anchorage, Alaska, United States
	(Australia)	Corey Banks	F	L	28	2017	Canberra, Australian Capital Territory, Australia
73	(Canada)	Stephen Blunden	LW	L	37	2014	Gloucester, Ontario, Canada
21	(Australia)	Jordan Brunt	F	L	26	2015	Canberra, Australian Capital Territory, Australia
25	(Canada)	Matt Buskas	D	R	41–42	2017	Edmonton, Alberta, Canada
17	(Australia)	James Byers	D	R	32	2014	Perth, Western Australia, Australia
9	(Australia)	Wehebe Darge	LW/RW	L	34	2017	Adelaide, South Australia, Australia
38	(Australia)	Nickolas Eckhardt	G	L	36	2014	Canberra, Australian Capital Territory, Australia
19	(Australia)	Jordan Gavin (A)	F	R	43	2014	Canberra, Australian Capital Territory, Australia
81	(New Zealand)	Matthew Harvey	D	R	40	2014	Calgary, Alberta, Canada
18	(Australia)	Mitchell Henning	F	R	28	2016	Brisbane, Queensland, Australia
71	(Canada)	Dominic Jalbert	D	L	37	2017	Hull, Québec, Canada
7	(Australia)	Bayley Kubara	D	R	27	2017	Wombarra, New South Wales, Australia
15	(Australia)	Casey Kubara	RW	R	30	2016	Wombarra, New South Wales, Australia
85	(Australia)	Toby Kubara	F	L	35	2017	Wombarra, New South Wales, Australia
16	(Australia)	Tyler Kubara	F	R	31	2015	Wombarra, New South Wales, Australia
77	(Australia)	Tom Letki	F	R	37	2014	Canberra, Australian Capital Territory, Australia
13	(Australia)	Matti Luoma	F	R	46	2016	Helsinki, Finland
14	(Australia)	Christopher McPhail	D/F	L	35	2017	New Westminster, British Columbia, Canada
64	(Australia)	Kai Miettinen	F	L	30	2014	Canberra, Australian Capital Territory, Australia
13	(Australia)	Luke Philps	F	R	43	2016	Australia
12	(Australia)	Mark Rummukainen (C)	D	R	44	2014	Canberra, Australian Capital Territory, Australia
24	(Czech Republic)	Jan Safar (A)	D	R	39	2016	Praha, Czech Republic
35	(Australia)	Alexandre Tetreault	G	L	27–28	2015	Montreal, Quebec, Canada
20	(Australia)	Aleksi Toivonen	G	L	30	2015	Canberra, Australian Capital Territory, Australia
88	(Canada)	Geordie Wudrick	LW	L	36	2016	Abbotsford, British Columbia, Canada

== Transfers ==
All the player transfers in and out by the CBR Brave for the 2017 AIHL season.

=== In ===
Pos	Player	Transferred From	Local / Import
C	(Australia) Brian Bales	No team	Local
F	(Australia) Corey Banks	No team	Local
D	(Canada) Matt Buskas	No team	Import
W	(Australia) Wehebe Darge	(Australia) Adelaide Adrenaline	Local
D	(Canada) Dominic Jalbert	(France) Pionniers De Chamonix-Morzine	Import
D	(Australia) Bayley Kubara	(Australia) Sydney Ice Dogs	Local
F	(Australia) Toby Kubara	No team	Local
F	(Australia) Christopher McPhail	No team	Local

=== Out ===
Pos	Player	Transferred To	Local / Import
D	(Canada) Art Bidlevskii	No team	Import
D	(Australia) Zachary Boyle	(Australia) Adelaide Adrenaline	Local
W	(Switzerland) Nicola Brandi	(Switzerland) SC Rapperswil-Jona Lakers	Import
C	(Australia) Harrison Byers	No team	Local
D	(Australia) Timothy Cox	No team	Local
F	(Australia) Matthew Gilpin	No team	Local
W	(Canada) Mathieu Guertin	(Canada) Trois-Rivières Blizzard	Import
F	(Australia) Ryan Johnson	Retired	Local
D	(Australia) Luke Moore	No team	Local
C	(Canada) Neal Prokop	No team	Import

== Staff ==
Staff Roster for 2017 AIHL season

2017 AIHL CBR Brave Staff
Role	Staff
Head coach	(Australia) Robert Starke
Assistant coach	(United States) David Rogina
Strength and conditioning coach	(Australia) Stuart Philps
Physiotherapist	(Australia) Sportstec
Equipment manager	(Australia) Adrian Miller
Bench official	(Australia) Darren Sault
Bench official	(Australia) Kelly Sault

== Standings ==
=== Regular season ===
Summary

Season	Overall										Home								Away							
Season	P	W	L	OW	OL	GF	GA	GD	Pts	Finish	P	W	L	OW	OL	GF	GA	GD	P	W	L	OW	OL	GF	GA	GD
2017	28	13	11	3	1	130	101	+29	46	3rd	14	6	6	1	1	71	57	+14	14	7	5	2	0	59	44	+15

Position by round

Round	1	2	3	4	5	6	7	8	9	10	11	12	13	14	15	16	17	18
Position	1	2	2	2	5	1	1	1	1	2	3	3	3	3	3	3	3	3

Updated to match(es) played on Completed. Source: www.icehockeynewsaustralia.com

League table

Team	GP	W	SOW	SOL	L	GF	GA	GDF	PTS
Melbourne Ice	28	22	2	1	3	132	75	+57	71
Perth Thunder	28	16	3	3	6	110	75	+35	57
CBR Brave	28	13	3	1	11	130	101	+29	46
Melbourne Mustangs	28	11	2	3	12	104	113	−9	40
Sydney Ice Dogs	28	12	0	0	16	73	81	−8	36
Sydney Bears	28	8	3	3	14	101	121	−20	33
Newcastle Northstars	28	7	3	3	15	97	124	−27	30
Adelaide Adrenaline	28	6	1	3	18	85	142	−57	23

Qualified for the Goodall Cup playoffs	H Newman Reid Trophy winners

=== Finals ===
Summary

Season	Finals weekend							
Season	P	W	L	GF	GA	Result	Semi-final	Goodall Cup final
2017	2	1	1	7	6	Runners-up	Won 6-2 (Thunder)	Lost 1-4 (Ice)

Bracket

Semi-finals
1	Melbourne Ice	4
4	Melbourne Mustangs	2
3	CBR Brave	6
2	Perth Thunder	2

Final
Melbourne Ice	4
CBR Brave	1

== Schedule & results ==
=== Regular season ===
Matchday	1	2	3	4	5	6	7	8	9	10	11	12	13	14	15	16	17	18	19	20	21	22	23	24	25	26	27	28
Arena	A	A	A	A	H	H	A	H	H	H	H	H	H	H	A	A	H	H	A	A	A	H	H	H	A	A	A	A
Result	W	W	W	L	L	W	W	W	W	L	W	W	L	W	L	L	L	L	W	W	W	L	W	L	W	W	L	L

Updated to match(es) played on Completed. Source: AIHL
A = Away; H = Home; W = Win; L = Loss

2017 fixtures and results
Date	Time	Away	Score	Home	Location	Recap
22 April	17:00	CBR Brave	4–2	Melbourne Mustangs	O'Brien Group Arena	
23 April	16:00	CBR Brave	4–3 (SO)	Melbourne Mustangs	O'Brien Group Arena	
30 April	17:00	CBR Brave	5–4 (SO)	Newcastle Northstars	Hunter Ice Skating Stadium	
6 May	17:00	CBR Brave	1–3	Sydney Bears	Macquarie Ice Rink	
7 May	17:00	Newcastle Northstars	6–5 (SO)	CBR Brave	Phillip Ice Skating Centre	
13 May	17:30	Newcastle Northstars	3–4	CBR Brave	Phillip Ice Skating Centre	
27 May	17:00	CBR Brave	4–1	Sydney Ice Dogs	Macquarie Ice Rink	
28 May	17:00	Sydney Ice Dogs	2–4	CBR Brave	Phillip Ice Skating Centre	
10 June	17:30	Adelaide Adrenaline	3–8	CBR Brave	Phillip Ice Skating Centre	
11 June	17:00	Adelaide Adrenaline	8–5	CBR Brave	Phillip Ice Skating Centre	
17 June	17:30	Sydney Bears	3–13	CBR Brave	Phillip Ice Skating Centre	
24 June	17:30	Sydney Bears	1–7	CBR Brave	Phillip Ice Skating Centre	
1 July	17:30	Melbourne Mustangs	5–3	CBR Brave	Phillip Ice Skating Centre	
2 July	17:00	Melbourne Mustangs	5–6 (SO)	CBR Brave	Phillip Ice Skating Centre	
8 July	16:30	CBR Brave	2–4	Perth Thunder	Perth Ice Arena	
9 July	16:30	CBR Brave	0–5	Perth Thunder	Perth Ice Arena	
15 July	17:30	Perth Thunder	3–2	CBR Brave	Phillip Ice Skating Centre	
16 July	17:00	Perth Thunder	3–1	CBR Brave	Phillip Ice Skating Centre	
22 July	16:30	CBR Brave	10–5	Adelaide Adrenaline	Adelaide Ice Arena	
23 July	16:30	CBR Brave	4–1	Adelaide Adrenaline	Adelaide Ice Arena	
29 July	17:00	CBR Brave	7–4	Sydney Bears	Macquarie Ice Rink	
5 August	17:30	Sydney Ice Dogs	4–2	CBR Brave	Phillip Ice Skating Centre	
12 August	17:00	Melbourne Ice	5–8	CBR Brave	Phillip Ice Skating Centre	
13 August	17:00	Melbourne Ice	6–3	CBR Brave	Phillip Ice Skating Centre	
19 August	17:00	CBR Brave	8–1	Newcastle Northstars	Hunter Ice Skating Stadium	
20 August	17:00	CBR Brave	6–1	Sydney Ice Dogs	Macquarie Ice Rink	
26 August	17:00	CBR Brave	2–5	Melbourne Ice	O'Brien Group Arena	
27 August	16:00	CBR Brave	2–5	Melbourne Ice	O'Brien Group Arena	

=== Finals ===
Goodall Cup semi-final

2 September 2017; 18:00	CBR Brave	6–2 (0–0, 2–1, 4–1)	Perth Thunder	O'Brien Group Arena

Game reference

Aleksi Toivonen
Goalies
Peter Di Salvo
Referees:
Kent Unwin
Jeff Scott
Linesmen:
Casper Russelhuber
Stephen De Witt

15:55 – Blunden (Bales, Wudrick)	1 – 0
	1 – 1	16:50 – Ouellet (Bernard, Kudla)
21:20 – Bales (PP) (Wudrick, Darge)	2 – 1
	2 – 2	30:26 – Bernard (PP) (Breault, Göransson)
32:25 – Jalbert (Blunden, Darge)	3 – 2
33:51 – Safar (PP) (Darge, Jalbert)	4 – 2
41:55 – Blunden (PP) (Darge, Jalbert)	5 – 2
48:10 – Wudrick (EN) (Jalbert, Safar)	6 – 2

12 min
Penalties
30 min
34
Shots
22

Goodall Cup final

3 September 2017; 15:00	CBR Brave	1–4 (0–1, 1–1, 0–2)	Melbourne Ice	O'Brien Group Arena; Attendance: 1500

Game reference

Aleksi Toivonen
Goalies
Dayne Davis
Referees:
Jeff Scott
Kent Unwin
Linesmen:
Steve Setka
Casper Russelhuber

	0 – 1	6:49 – Wong (Baclig, Carpenter)
22:37 – Blunden (Jalbert)	1 – 1
	1 – 2	29:24 – Ottosson (Brown, Dahlberg)
	1 – 3	32:18 – Ottosson (Powell, Brown)
	1 – 4	41:00 – Armstrong (Gibbs Sjödin)

8 min
Penalties
8 min
21
Shots
28

== Player statistics ==
=== Skaters ===
Regular season
Nat	Player	Pos	M	G	A	P	PIM
(Australia)	Brian Bales	F	21	10	30	40	8
(Australia)	Corey Banks	F	1	0	0	0	2
(Canada)	Stephen Blunden	F	16	24	22	46	16
(Australia)	Jordan Brunt	F	23	0	1	1	0
(Canada)	Matt Buskas	D	22	1	3	4	90
(Australia)	James Byers	D	27	0	4	4	24
(Australia)	Wehebe Darge	F	18	12	15	27	28
(Australia)	Jordan Gavin	F	16	0	2	2	10
(New Zealand)	Matthew Harvey	D	27	9	9	18	51
(Australia)	Mitchell Henning	F	16	1	0	1	2
(Canada)	Dominic Jalbert	D	28	16	37	53	72
(Australia)	Bayley Kubara	D	25	0	1	1	16
(Australia)	Casey Kubara	F	26	8	16	24	12
(Australia)	Toby Kubara	F	17	0	0	0	4
(Australia)	Tyler Kubara	F	20	8	2	10	14
(Australia)	Tom Letki	F	1	0	0	0	0
(Australia)	Matti Luoma	F	3	1	1	2	0
(Australia)	Christopher McPhail	D	25	4	3	7	0
(Australia)	Kai Miettinen	F	28	2	9	11	38
(Australia)	Luke Philps	F	3	1	0	1	2
(Australia)	Mark Rummukainen	D	24	2	4	6	10
(Czech Republic)	Jan Safar	D	27	8	34	42	63
(Canada)	Geordie Wudrick	F	25	20	34	54	28

Finals
Nat	Player	Pos	M	G	A	P	PIM
(Australia)	Brian Bales	F	2	1	1	2	2
(Australia)	Corey Banks	F	0	0	0	0	0
(Canada)	Stephen Blunden	F	2	3	1	4	4
(Australia)	Jordan Brunt	F	0	0	0	0	0
(Canada)	Matt Buskas	D	1	0	0	0	0
(Australia)	James Byers	D	2	0	0	0	0
(Australia)	Wehebe Darge	F	2	0	4	4	0
(Australia)	Jordan Gavin	F	1	0	0	0	2
(New Zealand)	Matthew Harvey	D	2	0	0	0	0
(Australia)	Mitchell Henning	F	0	0	0	0	0
(Canada)	Dominic Jalbert	D	2	1	4	5	0
(Australia)	Bayley Kubara	D	2	0	0	0	0
(Australia)	Casey Kubara	F	0	0	0	0	0
(Australia)	Toby Kubara	F	1	0	0	0	0
(Australia)	Tyler Kubara	F	0	0	0	0	0
(Australia)	Tom Letki	F	0	0	0	0	0
(Australia)	Matti Luoma	F	0	0	0	0	0
(Australia)	Christopher McPhail	D	2	0	0	0	0
(Australia)	Kai Miettinen	F	2	0	0	0	0
(Australia)	Luke Philps	F	0	0	0	0	0
(Australia)	Mark Rummukainen	D	0	0	0	0	0
(Czech Republic)	Jan Safar	D	2	1	1	2	6
(Canada)	Geordie Wudrick	F	2	1	2	3	6

=== Goaltenders ===
Regular season
Nat	Player	Pos	M	G	A	PIM	SO	MP	GA	GAA	SA	SV	SV%
(Australia)	Nickolas Eckhardt	G	–										
(Australia)	Alexandre Tetreault	G	6	0	0	2	0	235	19	4.85	125	106	0.848
(Australia)	Aleksi Toivonen	G	24	0	1	0	0	1128	77	4.10	611	534	0.874

Finals
Nat	Player	Pos	M	G	A	PIM	SO	MP	GA	GAA	SA	SV	SV%
(Australia)	Nickolas Eckhardt	G	–										
(Australia)	Alexandre Tetreault	G	–										
(Australia)	Aleksi Toivonen	G	2	0	0	0	0	100	6	3.60	50	44	0.880

== Awards ==
Team awards for 2017 season

2017 Brave awards
Award	Recipient
Bravest of the Brave	(Canada) Stephen Blunden
Best Forward	(Canada) Stephen Blunden
Best Defenceman	(Canada) Dominic Jalbert
Fans Choice	(Czech Republic) Jan Safar
Player’s Choice	(Canada) Dominic Jalbert
Coach’s Award	(New Zealand) Matt Harvey
Emerging Brave	(Australia) Bayley Kubara
John Lewis Memorial Award	(Australia) Krisy Maricic (Australia) Bede Riley

AIHL awards for 2017 season

2017 AIHL awards
Award	Recipient
Rookie of the Year	(Australia) Bayley Kubara
