= 2014 CBR Brave season =

2014 CBR Brave
- League: 3rd AIHL
- 2014 record: 14–2–2–9
- Home record: 7–1–1–4
- Road record: 7–2–1–5
- Goals for: 106
- Goals against: 89

Team information
- Coach: (Finland) Matti Luoma
- Assistant coach: (United States) David Rogina
- Captain: (Australia) Mark Rummukainen
- Alternate captains: (Australia) Aaron Clayworth (New Zealand) Matthew Harvey
- Arena: Phillip Ice Skating Centre

Team leaders
- Goals: (Canada) Stephen Blunden(36)
- Assists: (Finland) Anton Kokkonen (42)
- Points: (Canada) Stephen Blunden(68)
- Penalty minutes: (Australia) Harrison Byers (111)
- Goals against average: (Finland) Petri Pitkänen (3.52)

The 2014 CBR Brave season was the Brave's 1st season in the Australian Ice Hockey League since being founded in pre-season before the 2014 AIHL season. The season ran from 12 April 2014 to 30 August 2014 for the Brave. CBR finished third in their inaugural regular season behind the Melbourne Mustangs and Melbourne Ice. The Brave qualified for the AIHL Finals in Melbourne and played in semi-final two. Canberra were defeated by the Melbourne Ice, 1–6 in their semi-final match and were knocked out of the finals weekend, ending their season.

== News ==
The CBR Brave was established in March 2014 following the collapse of the Canberra Knights in late February. The Brave appointed former player Matti Luoma as their inaugural head coach. The team filled their playing roster quickly with a mix of local and international players. The first visa player to join the team was Finnish goaltender Petri Pitkänen. The Brave filled their visa quota with the signings of Anton Kokkonen, Stephen Blunden and Mathieu Ouellett.

12 April 2014, The Brave played their maiden AIHL match at home in front of around 1,000 fans against the Newcastle North Stars. The visiting North Stars won the match 2–0. The Brave won their second match to record their first victory. The defeated the defending champions, the Sydney Ice Dogs, with a dominant third period display.

In July, one home match at Phillip had to be cancelled due to the travelling Adelaide Adrenaline team suffering a bus crash. A number of the Adelaide players were taken to hospital as a precaution but no one was seriously injured. The match was originally postponed but the league commission eventually cancelled the fixture and gave both teams one competition point each.

In August the Brave finished the regular season third in the table, qualifying for the AIHL finals weekend in Melbourne. It was the first time since the AIHL was founded in 2000 that a Canberra-based team had qualified for finals.

== Roster ==
Team roster for the 2014 AIHL season

2014 AIHL CBR Brave Roster
#	Nat	Name	Pos	S/G	Age	Acquired	Birthplace
44	(Australia)	David Bell	D		20	2014	Cairns, Queensland, Australia
8	(Canada)	Stephen Blunden	LW	L	26	2014	Gloucester, Ontario, Canada
18	(Australia)	Harrison Byers	C	R	22	2014	Regina, Saskatchewan, Canada
17	(Australia)	James Byers	D	R	21	2014	Canberra, Australian Capital Territory, Australia
6	(Australia)	Aaron Clayworth	D	R	30	2014	Perth, Western Australia, Australia
7	(Australia)	Darren Cope	F	R	30–31	2014	Canberra, Australian Capital Territory, Australia
35	(Australia)	Nickolas Eckhardt	G	L	25	2014	Canberra, Australian Capital Territory, Australia
19	(Australia)	Jordan Gavin	F	R	32–33	2014	Canberra, Australian Capital Territory, Australia
27	(Canada)	Mike Giorgi	D	L	27	2014	Toronto, Ontario, Canada
25	(New Zealand)	Jeff Harvey	F		21	2014	Okotoks, Alberta, Canada
65	(New Zealand)	Matthew Harvey	D	R	29	2014	Calgary, Alberta, Canada
3	(United States)	Ryan Johnson	F	R	40–41	2014	Amesbury, Massachusetts, United States
20	(Australia)	Brad Hunt	G	L	45	2014	Hamilton, Ontario, Canada
56	(Finland)	Anton Kokkonen	C	L	26	2014	Turku, Finland
10	(Australia)	Matt Lehoczky	F	R	38	2014	Canberra, Australian Capital Territory, Australia
77	(Australia)	Tom Letki	F	R	26	2014	Canberra, Australian Capital Territory, Australia
11	(Australia)	David Lewis	F	L	37	2014	Canberra, Australian Capital Territory, Australia
21	(Australia)	Matti Luoma	RW	R	35	2014	Helsinki, Finland
14	(Australia)	Christopher McPhail	D	L	24	2014	Canberra, Australian Capital Territory, Australia
64	(Australia)	Kai Miettinen	F	L	19	2014	Canberra, Australian Capital Territory, Australia
5	(Canada)	Mathieu Ouellette	LW	L	26	2014	Clarence Creek, Ontario, Canada
54	(Finland)	Petri Pitkänen	G	L	23–24	2014	Jyväskylä, Finland
66	(Australia)	Shai Rabinowitz	F	R	27	2014	Port Macquarie, New South Wales, Australia
32	(Australia)	Alain Riesen	F	L	24–25	2014	Canberra, Australian Capital Territory, Australia
12	(Australia)	Mark Rummukainen	D	R	33	2014	Canberra, Australian Capital Territory, Australia
88	(Australia)	Darren Taylor	D			2014	Canberra, Australian Capital Territory, Australia
91	(Australia)	Peter Taylor	F	R	27	2014	Canberra, Australian Capital Territory, Australia
13	(Canada)	Derek Walker	F		21	2014	Winnipeg, Manitoba, Canada

== Transfers ==
All the player transfers in and out by the CBR Brave for the 2014 AIHL season.

=== In ===
Pos	Player	Transferred From	Local / Import
D	(Australia) David Bell	(Australia) Canberra Knights	Local
W	(Canada) Stephen Blunden	(Canada) University of Ottawa	Import
C	(Australia) Harrison Byers	(Australia) Canberra Knights	Local
D	(Australia) James Byers	(Australia) Canberra Knights	Local
D	(Australia) Aaron Clayworth	No team	Local
F	(Australia) Darren Cope	No team	Local
G	(Australia) Nickolas Eckhardt	(Australia) Canberra Knights	Local
F	(Australia) Jordan Gavin	(Australia) Canberra Knights	Local
D	(Canada) Mike Giorgi	No team	Import
F	(New Zealand) Jeff Harvey	(Australia) University of Victoria	Local
D	(New Zealand) Matthew Harvey	(Canada) Okotoks Drillers	Local
F	(United States) Ryan Johnson	No team	Local
G	(Australia) Brad Hunt	(Australia) Canberra Knights	Local
C	(Finland) Anton Kokkonen	(Finland) TuTo	Import
F	(Australia) Matt Lehoczky	No team	Local
F	(Australia) Tom Letki	(Australia) Canberra Knights	Local
F	(Australia) David Lewis	(Australia) Canberra Knights	Local
W	(Australia) Matti Luoma	(Australia) Canberra Knights	Local
D	(Australia) Christopher McPhail	No team	Local
F	(Australia) Kai Miettinen	(Australia) Canberra Knights	Local
W	(Canada) Mathieu Ouellette	(Canada) University of Ottawa	Import
G	(Finland) Petri Pitkänen	(Finland) KeuPa HT	Import
F	(Australia) Shai Rabinowitz	(Australia) Newcastle North Stars	Local
F	(Australia) Alain Riesen	(Australia) Canberra Knights	Local
D	(Australia) Mark Rummukainen	(Australia) Canberra Knights	Local
D	(Australia) Darren Taylor	No team	Local
F	(Australia) Peter Taylor	(Australia) Canberra Knights	Local
F	(Canada) Derek Walker	(Canada) St. James Canucks	Import
F	(Canada) Corey Wilkie	(Canada) St. James Canucks	Import
G	(Australia) Stuart Woodall	(Australia) Canberra Knights	Local

=== Out ===
- N/A - first season

== Staff ==
Staff Roster for 2014 AIHL season

2014 AIHL CBR Brave Staff
Role	Staff
Head coach	(Australia) Matti Luoma
Assistant coach	(United States) David Rogina
Physiotherapist	(Australia) Ben Pagett
Equipment manager	(Australia) Adrian Miller
Bench official	(Australia) Darren Sault
Bench official	(Australia) Kelly Sault

== Standings ==
=== Regular season ===
Summary

Season	Overall										Home								Away							
Season	P	W	L	OW	OL	GF	GA	GD	Pts	Finish	P	W	L	OW	OL	GF	GA	GD	P	W	L	OW	OL	GF	GA	GD
2014	27	14	9	2	2	106	89	+17	49	3rd	13	7	4	1	1	45	37	+8	14	7	5	1	1	61	52	+9

Position by round

Round	1	2	3	4	5	6	7	8	9	10	11	12	13	14	15	16	17	18	19	20
Position	5	6	5	6	5	4	3	3	3	2	3	3	2	4	4	3	2	2	3	3

Updated to match(es) played on Completed. Source: www.icehockeynewsaustralia.com

League table

Team	GP	W	OTW	T	OTL	L	GF	GA	GDF	PTS
Melbourne Mustangs	28	17	0	0	3	8	108	88	+20	54
Melbourne Ice	28	14	3	0	3	8	104	88	+16	51
CBR Brave	28	14	2	1	2	9	106	89	+17	49
Sydney Ice Dogs	28	14	2	0	1	11	116	97	+19	47
Adelaide Adrenaline	28	10	5	2	1	10	94	90	+4	43
Newcastle North Stars	28	11	0	0	2	15	87	106	−19	35
Perth Thunder	28	9	2	0	2	15	94	94	0	33
Sydney Bears	28	6	1	1	1	19	68	125	−57	22

Qualified for the Goodall Cup playoffs	H Newman Reid Trophy winners

=== Finals ===
Summary

Season	Finals weekend							
Season	P	W	L	GF	GA	Result	Semi-final	Goodall Cup final
2014	1	0	1	1	6	Semi-finalists	Lost 1-6 (Ice)	

Bracket

Semifinals
1	Melbourne Mustangs	6
4	Sydney Ice Dogs	4
3	CBR Brave	1
2	Melbourne Ice	6

Final
Melbourne Mustangs	6
Melbourne Ice	1

== Schedule & results ==
=== Regular season ===
Results per match day

Matchday	1	2	3	4	5	6	7	8	9	10	11	12	13	14	15	16	17	18	19	20	21	22	23	24	25	26	27	28
Arena	H	H	H	A	H	H	A	H	H	H	H	A	A	A	H	A	A	A	H	A	A	H	A	H	H	A	A	A
Result	L	W	L	W	W	W	W	L	W	W	W	L	L	W	L	W	L	L	T	W	W	W	W	L	W	L	L	W

Updated to match(es) played on Completed. Source: AIHL
A = Away; H = Home; W = Win; L = Loss; T = Tie

2014 fixtures and results
Date	Time	Away	Score	Home	Location	Recap
12 April	17:30	Newcastle North Stars	2–0	CBR Brave	Canberra	
26 April	17:30	Sydney Ice Dogs	2–6	CBR Brave	Canberra	
10 May	17:30	Adelaide Adrenaline	5–2	CBR Brave	Canberra	
11 May	17:00	CBR Brave	4–2	Newcastle North Stars	Newcastle	
17 May	17:30	Perth Thunder	1–5	CBR Brave	Canberra	
18 May	17:00	Perth Thunder	4 – 5 (SO)	CBR Brave	Canberra	
24 May	17:00	CBR Brave	5–2	Newcastle North Stars	Newcastle	
31 May	17:30	Melbourne Ice	2 – 1 (SO)	CBR Brave	Canberra	
1 June	17:00	Melbourne Ice	2–4	CBR Brave	Canberra	
7 June	17:30	Sydney Bears	1–4	CBR Brave	Canberra	
14 June	17:30	Sydney Bears	6–8	CBR Brave	Canberra	
15 June	17:00	CBR Brave	3–6	Sydney Ice Dogs	Liverpool	
21 June	17:00	CBR Brave	2 – 3 (SO)	Melbourne Ice	Melbourne	
22 June	16:00	CBR Brave	6 – 5 (SO)	Melbourne Ice	Melbourne	
28 June	17:30	Sydney Ice Dogs	4–1	CBR Brave	Canberra	
5 July	17:00	CBR Brave	7–4	Melbourne Mustangs	Melbourne	
6 July	16:00	CBR Brave	3–4	Melbourne Mustangs	Melbourne	
12 July	17:00	CBR Brave	4–5	Sydney Ice Dogs	Liverpool	
19 July	17:30	Adelaide Adrenaline	Cancelled	CBR Brave	Canberra	
26 July	16:30	CBR Brave	3–1	Perth Thunder	Perth	
27 July	16:30	CBR Brave	5–3	Perth Thunder	Perth	
2 August	17:30	Newcastle North Stars	2–3	CBR Brave	Canberra	
3 August	15:30	CBR Brave	12–4	Sydney Bears	Baulkham Hills	
9 August	17:30	Melbourne Mustangs	4–2	CBR Brave	Canberra	
10 August	17:00	Melbourne Mustangs	2–4	CBR Brave	Canberra	
16 August	16:30	CBR Brave	2–5	Adelaide Adrenaline	Adelaide	
17 August	15:30	CBR Brave	2–6	Adelaide Adrenaline	Adelaide	
23 August	18:00	CBR Brave	3–2	Sydney Bears	Baulkham Hills	

=== Finals ===
Goodall Cup semi-final

30 August 2014; 18:30	CBR Brave	1–6 (0–2, 1–2, 0–2)	Melbourne Ice	Medibank Icehouse; Attendance: 1500

Game reference

Petri Pitkanen
Goalies
Jaden Pine-Murphy
Referee:
Rick West
Linesmen:
Matthew Taylor
Casper Russell-Huber

	0 – 1	6:45 – Powell (Hamilton)
	0 – 2	8:58 – Graham (PP) (Powell, Humphries)
	0 – 3	18:27 – Armstrong (Johansson)
Blunden (Kokkonen) – 19:10	1 – 3
	1 – 4	21:54 – J. Smith (PP) (Powell, Brown)
	1 – 5	46:43 – Johansson (Brown, Webster)
	1 – 6	48:24 – Powell (PP) (Brown)

24 min
Penalties
14 min
23
Shots
40

== Player statistics ==
=== Skaters ===
Regular season
Nat	Player	Pos	M	G	A	P	PIM
(Australia)	David Bell	D	17	0	0	0	0
(Canada)	Stephen Blunden	F	24	36	32	68	59
(Australia)	Harrison Byers	F	21	1	3	4	111
(Australia)	James Byers	D	26	3	5	8	14
(Australia)	Aaron Clayworth	D	27	1	8	9	30
(Australia)	Darren Cope	F	1	0	0	0	0
(Australia)	Jordan Gavin	F	19	6	4	10	26
(Canada)	Mike Giorgi	D	6	1	6	7	8
(New Zealand)	Jeff Harvey	F	12	1	1	2	2
(New Zealand)	Matthew Harvey	D	27	7	17	24	30
(United States)	Ryan Johnson	F	11	1	0	1	70
(Finland)	Anton Kokkonen	F	25	17	42	59	18
(Australia)	Matt Lehoczky	F	20	2	1	3	16
(Australia)	Tom Letki	F	13	0	1	1	4
(Australia)	David Lewis	F	21	0	2	2	4
(Australia)	Matti Luoma	F	5	0	1	1	0
(Australia)	Christopher McPhail	D	26	4	3	7	10
(Australia)	Kai Miettinen	F	27	3	4	7	14
(Canada)	Mathieu Ouellette	F	22	17	40	57	16
(Australia)	Shai Rabinowitz	F	19	0	2	2	4
(Australia)	Alain Riesen	F	1	0	0	0	0
(Australia)	Mark Rummukainen	D	26	0	9	9	43
(Australia)	Darren Taylor	D	1	0	0	0	0
(Australia)	Peter Taylor	F	20	0	3	3	8
(Canada)	Derek Walker	F	1	0	0	0	12
(Canada)	Corey Wilkie	F	5	4	0	4	10

Finals
Nat	Player	Pos	M	G	A	P	PIM
(Australia)	David Bell	D	1	0	0	0	0
(Canada)	Stephen Blunden	F	1	1	0	1	6
(Australia)	Harrison Byers	F	1	0	0	0	2
(Australia)	James Byers	D	1	0	0	0	0
(Australia)	Blake Cameron	F	0	0	0	0	0
(Australia)	Aaron Clayworth	D	1	0	0	0	0
(Australia)	Darren Cope	F	0	0	0	0	0
(Australia)	Jordan Gavin	F	1	0	0	0	0
(Canada)	Mike Giorgi	D	0	0	0	0	0
(New Zealand)	Jeff Harvey	F	0	0	0	0	0
(New Zealand)	Matthew Harvey	D	1	0	0	0	4
(United States)	Ryan Johnson	F	1	0	0	0	0
(Finland)	Anton Kokkonen	F	1	0	1	1	10
(Australia)	Matt Lehoczky	F	1	0	0	0	0
(Australia)	Tom Letki	F	1	0	0	0	0
(Australia)	David Lewis	F	1	0	0	0	0
(Australia)	Matti Luoma	F	1	0	0	0	0
(Australia)	Christopher McPhail	D	1	0	0	0	0
(Australia)	Kai Miettinen	F	1	0	0	0	0
(Canada)	Mathieu Ouellette	F	1	0	0	0	2
(Australia)	Shai Rabinowitz	F	1	0	0	0	0
(Australia)	Alain Riesen	F	1	0	0	0	0
(Australia)	Mark Rummukainen	D	1	0	0	0	0
(Australia)	Darren Taylor	D	0	0	0	0	0
(Australia)	Peter Taylor	F	1	0	0	0	0
(Canada)	Derek Walker	F	0	0	0	0	0
(Canada)	Corey Wilkie	F	0	0	0	0	0

=== Goaltenders ===
Regular season
Nat	Player	Pos	M	SO	MP	GA	GAA	SA	SV	SV%	G	A	PIM
(Australia)	Brad Hunt	G	4	0	100	13	7.83	67	54	0.806	0	0	0
(Finland)	Petri Pitkänen	G	25	0	1227	72	3.52	764	692	0.906	0	1	4
(Australia)	Stuart Woodall	G	1	0	20	2	6	13	11	0.846	0	0	0

Finals
Nat	Player	Pos	M	SO	MP	GA	GAA	SA	SV	SV%	G	A	PIM
(Australia)	Brad Hunt	G	0	-	-	-	-	-	-	-	-	-	-
(Finland)	Petri Pitkänen	G	1	0	50	6	7.20	40	34	0.850	0	0	0
(Australia)	Stuart Woodall	G	0	-	-	-	-	-	-	-	-	-	-

== Awards ==
Team awards for 2014 season

2014 Brave awards
Award	Recipient
Bravest of the Brave	(Finland) Petri Pitkanen
Best Forward	(Canada) Stephen Blunden
Best Defenceman	(New Zealand) Matt Harvey
Fans Choice	(Finland) Anton Kokkonen
Player's Choice	(Australia) Aaron Clayworth
Coach's Award	(Australia) Aaron Clayworth
Emerging Brave	(Australia) Kai Miettinen
John Lewis Memorial Award	(Australia) Mark Rummukainen

AIHL awards for 2014 season

2014 AIHL awards
Award	Recipient
Goaltender of the year	(Finland) Petri Pitkanen
