= 2024 Canberra Brave season =

Australian ice hockey team season

2024 Canberra Brave
- Goodall Cup champions
- League: 5th AIHL
- Conference: 2nd Rurak
- 2024 record: 15–1–3–11
- Home record: 8–0–2–5
- Road record: 7–1–1–6
- Goals for: 128
- Goals against: 105

Team information
- Coach: (Australia) Stuart Philps
- Assistant coach: (Australia) Jeff Helbren
- Captain: (Australia) Kai Miettinen
- Alternate captains: (Australia) Bayley Kubara (Australia) Casey Kubara
- Arena: Phillip Ice Skating Centre

Team leaders
- Goals: (United States) Austin Cangelosi (24)
- Assists: (United States) Austin Cangelosi (29)
- Points: (United States) Austin Cangelosi (53)
- Penalty minutes: (Canada) Matthew Harvey (41)
- Goals against average: (Australia) Aleksi Toivonen (2.79)

The 2024 Canberra Brave season was the Brave's 9th season in the Australian Ice Hockey League since being founded and entering the league in 2014. Canberra finished fifth in the AIHL league standings and second in the Rurak Conference behind the Newcastle Northstars. The Brave claimed their third championship title and lifted the Goodall Cup after defeating the Melbourne Ice in the grand final of the AIHL Finals weekend.

== Season notes ==
Before the start of the regular season, the Brave marked 10 years since joining the league. They launched a re-brand of the franchise, by updating the team name, colours and logo. CBR Brave become Canberra Brave, blue, yellow and white become black, gold and white and an updated 'B' and 'Brave' shortform and longform logos. The Brave then released a trio of New Jersey designs produced by Hockey Militia with the home jersey becoming black, away remaining white and a third alternative jersey of gold. The jerseys were also the first in team history to use stitched logos and name plates and incorporated a special shoulder 10 year team crest. Caribou Kingston was re-signed as naming right partner for a second season and former AIHL head coach, Andrew Petrie, was appointed as Head of Hockey Operations. Kai Miettenen was announced team captain for 2025, a role he had held since 2022, with Bayley and Casey Kubara as alternative captains.

== Roster ==
Team roster for the 2024 AIHL season.

Canberra Brave roster - 2024 AIHL season
Active roster		Inactive roster	Coaching staff
Goaltenders: -- (Australia) Victor Sjodin; 29 (Australia) Alexandre Tétreault; 35 (Australia) Aleksi Toivonen; -- (Australia) Lachlan White; Defencemen: 71 (Australia) Jordan Brunt; 44 (Australia) Nick Christensen; 9 (United States) Matt Clark (I); 4 (Australia) Lachlan Fahmy; 7 (Australia) Bayley Kubara (A); 90 (United States) Matthew Marasco; 8 (Canada) Cameron Marks (I); 43 (Australia) Bodhi Matthew	Forwards: 44 (Australia) Matthew Buskas; 88 (United States) Austin Cangelosi (I); 24 (New Zealand) Jacob Carey; 42 (Australia) Jackson Gallagher; 81 (Canada) Matthew Harvey; 3 (Australia) Mitchell Henning; 15 (Australia) Casey Kubara (A); 16 (Australia) Tyler Kubara; 61 (Australia) Joseph Maatouk; 47 (Canada) Justin Maylan (I); 64 (Australia) Kai Miettinen (C); 96 (Australia) Ricki Miettinen; 19 (New Zealand) Jake Ratcliffe; 17 (Australia) Thomas Steven; 14 (Australia) Charlie York; 91 (Australia) Henry York	-- (Germany) Maximilian Astner (F) (RES); 95 (Canada) Jean Dupuy (F) (I) (RES); 85 (Australia) Toby Kubara (F) (RES); 21 (Sweden) Jonatan Ruth (F) (RES)	Head Coach: (Australia) Stuart Philps; Coaches: (Australia) Jeff Helbren (AC); (Australia) Peter Di Salvo (GC); (Australia) Andrew Deans (TM); (Australia) Darryl Day (EM); (Australia) Tom Letki (EM); (Australia) Rob Reid (TD); (Australia) Jono Carey (PT); Legend (C) Captain (A) Alternate Captain (I) Import player Statistics; Average age: 27.2; Average height: 183.9 cm Average weight: 83.2 kg Locals: 26; Imports: 4 Acquired 2024: 13; Acquired pre-2024: 17
Last updated on: 16 May 2024
Elite Prospects IHNA

== Transfers ==
All transfers in and out of the team since the last AIHL season.

=== In ===
Pos	Player	Transferred From	Local / Import
F	(Germany) Maximilian Astner	No team	Import
D/F	(Australia) Matt Buskas	No team	Local
C	(United States) Austin Cangelosi	Stjernen Hockey	Import
C	(New Zealand) Jacob Carey	New Jersey Rockets	Local
D	(United States) Matt Clark*	Birmingham Bulls	Import
C/W	(Canada) Jean Dupuy*	Tohoku Free Blades	Import
D	(United States) Matt Marasco	No team	Local
D	(Australia) Bodhi Matthew	Adelaide Generals	Local
C	(Canada) Justin Maylan	Wipptal Broncos	Import
W	(New Zealand) Jake Ratcliffe	Danbury Hat Tricks	Local
D/F	(Sweden) Jonatan Ruth	The Coast	Import
F	(Australia) Thomas Steven	Sydney Bears	Local
G	(Australia) Victor Sjodin	Bulls (ACT)	Local
G	(Australia) Lachlan White*	Rebels (ACT)	Local

* Mid-season transfer

=== Out ===
Pos	Player	Transferred To	Local / Import
W	(United States) Austin Albrecht	Melbourne Ice	Import
C	(Australia) Andreas Camenzind	No team	Local
D	(Australia) Mike Giorgi	Melbourne Mustangs	Local
G	(Australia) Andrew Glass	No team	Local
F	(Australia) Joey Hughes	Melbourne Ice	Local
C	(Canada) Félix Plouffe	Diables Rouges de Valenciennes	Import
F	(Australia) Jake Riley	Sydney Bears	Local
F	(Canada) Christopher Stoikos	Saint-Roch-de-l’Achigan Jaguars	Import
D	(United States) Carson Vance	Birmingham Bulls	Import

* Mid-season transfer

== Staff ==
Current as of 2024 AIHL season.

Canberra Brave Staff
Role	Staff
Head coach	(Australia) Stuart Philps
Assistant Coach	(Australia) Jeff Helbren
Assistant Coach	(Australia) Jordan Gavin
Goaltending Coach	(Canada) Peter Di Salvo
Team Manager	(Australia) Andrew Deans
Equipment Manager	(Australia) Darryl Day
Equipment Manager	(Australia) Tom Letki
Team Doctor	(Australia) Rob Reid
Physiotherapist	(Australia) Jono Carey
Trainer	(Australia) Brent Russ
General Manager	(Australia) Jordan Gavin
Head of Hockey Operations	(Australia) Andrew Petrie
Chief Operating Officer	(Australia) Steve Moeller
Chief Executive Officer	(Australia) Stephen Campbell
Bench Official	(Australia) Darren Sault
Bench Official	(Australia) Kelly Sault

== Standings ==
=== Regular season ===
Summary

Season	Overall										Home								Away							
Season	P	W	OW	OL	L	GF	GA	GD	Pts	Finish	P	W	OW	OL	L	GF	GA	GD	P	W	OW	OL	L	GF	GA	GD
2024	30	15	1	3	11	128	105	+23	50	5th	15	8	0	2	5	60	47	+13	15	7	1	1	6	68	58	+10

Position by round

Round	1	2	3	4	5	6	7	8	9	10	11	12	13	14	15	16	17	18	19
Position	5	7	9	10	10	10	9	7	7	7	6	6	6	5	5	6	5	5	5

Updated to match(es) played on Completed. Source: www.icehockeynewsaustralia.com

League table

Pos	Team	Pld	W	OTW	OTL	L	GF	GA	GD	Pts	Qualification or relegation
1	Sydney Bears	30	23	1	1	5	166	103	+63	72	2024 Goodall Cup Finals
2	Melbourne Ice	30	18	2	3	7	154	99	+55	58	2024 Goodall Cup Finals
3	Perth Thunder	30	15	5	1	9	124	98	+26	53	2024 Goodall Cup Finals
4	Newcastle Northstars	30	13	3	7	7	124	108	+16	52	2024 Goodall Cup Finals
5	Canberra Brave	30	15	1	3	11	128	105	+23	50	2024 Goodall Cup Finals
6	Melbourne Mustangs	30	13	2	1	14	136	120	+16	44	
7	Brisbane Lightning	30	9	4	1	16	85	124	−39	36	2024 Goodall Cup Finals
8	Sydney Ice Dogs	30	9	3	1	17	112	145	−33	34	
9	Adelaide Adrenaline	30	5	2	6	17	70	108	−38	25	
10	Central Coast Rhinos	30	4	3	2	21	81	170	−89	20	

Source: AIHL Elite Prospects
Rules for classification:
Tie-break: 1) points; 2) points percentage; 3) head to head; 4) goal difference; 5) goals scored; 6) coin toss
Points: 3 points for regulation win; 2 points for OT or SO win; 1 point for OT or SO loss; 0 points for regulation loss
Note: Melbourne Ice and Perth Thunder were both deducted 3 points by the league for breaching player cap regulations.

Rurak Conference

Pos	Team	Pld	W	OTW	OTL	L	GF	GA	GD	Pts	Qualification or relegation
1	Newcastle Northstars	30	13	3	7	7	124	108	+16	52	2024 Goodall Cup Finals
2	Canberra Brave	30	15	1	3	11	128	105	+23	50	2024 Goodall Cup Finals
3	Brisbane Lightning	30	9	4	1	16	85	124	−39	36	2024 Goodall Cup Finals
4	Adelaide Adrenaline	30	5	2	6	17	70	108	−38	25	
5	Central Coast Rhinos	30	4	3	2	21	81	170	−89	20	

Source: AIHL Elite Prospects
Rules for classification:
Tie-break: 1) points; 2) points percentage; 3) head to head; 4) goal difference; 5) goals scored; 6) coin toss
Points: 3 points for regulation win; 2 points for OT or SO win; 1 point for OT or SO loss; 0 points for regulation loss

=== Finals ===
Summary

Season	Finals weekend								
Season	P	W	L	GF	GA	Result	Play-in final	Semi-final	Goodall Cup final
2024	3	3	0	12	3	Gold	Won 2-1 (Thunder)	Won 5-2 (Bears)	Won 5-0 (Ice)

Bracket

Preliminary-finals
23 August – Melbourne
Melbourne Ice	5
Brisbane Lightning	0
23 August – Newcastle
Perth Thunder	1
Canberra Brave	2

Semi-finals
24 August – Melbourne
Sydney Bears	2
Canberra Brave	5
24 August – Melbourne
Newcastle Northstars	3
Melbourne Ice	4

Grand final
25 August – Melbourne
Canberra Brave	5
Melbourne Ice	0

== Schedule & results ==
=== Regular season ===
Matchday	1	2	3	4	5	6	7	8	9	10	11	12	13	14	15	16	17	18	19	20	21	22	23	24	25	26	27	28	29	30
Arena	A	A	A	A	H	H	H	H	H	A	A	A	A	H	H	H	H	H	A	H	H	A	A	A	H	A	A	H	H	H
Result	L	W	L	L	L	L	L	L	L	L	L	W	W	L	W	W	L	W	W	L	W	W	W	L	W	W	W	W	W	W

Updated to match(es) played on Completed. Source: AIHL
A = Away; H = Home; W = Win; L = Loss

2024 fixtures and results
Date	Time	Away	Score	Home	Location	Recap
6 Apr 2024	17:00	Canberra Brave	3–7	Newcastle Northstars	Hunter Ice Skating Stadium	
7 Apr 2024	17:00	Canberra Brave	6–1	Sydney Ice Dogs	Macquarie Ice Rink	
13 Apr 2024	16:30	Canberra Brave	2–7	Perth Thunder	Perth Ice Arena	
14 Apr 2024	16:30	Canberra Brave	3–6	Perth Thunder	Perth Ice Arena	
20 Apr 2024	17:15	Brisbane Lightning	5–2	Canberra Brave	Phillip Ice Skating Centre	
21 Apr 2024	16:45	Brisbane Lightning	5–2	Canberra Brave	Phillip Ice Skating Centre	
27 Apr 2024	17:15	Newcastle Northstars	6–2	Canberra Brave	Phillip Ice Skating Centre	
4 May 2024	17:15	Melbourne Ice	4–3 (SO)	Canberra Brave	Phillip Ice Skating Centre	
5 May 2024	16:45	Melbourne Ice	3–1	Canberra Brave	Phillip Ice Skating Centre	
11 May 2024	17:00	Canberra Brave	2–4	Melbourne Ice	O’Brien Icehouse	
12 May 2024	14:00	Canberra Brave	3–4	Melbourne Mustangs	O’Brien Icehouse	
18 May 2024	16:30	Canberra Brave	7–6 (SO)	Adelaide Adrenaline	Adelaide Ice Arena	
19 May 2024	17:00	Canberra Brave	4–1	Adelaide Adrenaline	Adelaide Ice Arena	
25 May 2024	17:00	Canberra Brave	2–4	Newcastle Northstars	Hunter Ice Skating Stadium	
26 May 2024	16:45	Sydney Ice Dogs	1–5	Canberra Brave	Phillip Ice Skating Centre	
1 Jun 2024	17:15	Sydney Bears	3–5	Canberra Brave	Phillip Ice Skating Centre	
8 Jun 2024	17:15	Melbourne Mustangs	5–2	Canberra Brave	Phillip Ice Skating Centre	
9 Jun 2024	16:45	Melbourne Mustangs	2–6	Canberra Brave	Phillip Ice Skating Centre	
15 Jun 2024	15:30	Canberra Brave	11–4	Central Coast Rhinos	Erina Ice Arena	
22 Jun 2024	17:15	Perth Thunder	3–2 (OT)	Canberra Brave	Phillip Ice Skating Centre	
29 Jun 2024	17:15	Newcastle Northstars	3–7	Canberra Brave	Phillip Ice Skating Centre	
30 Jun 2024	17:00	Canberra Brave	6–3	Sydney Ice Dogs	Macquarie Ice Rink	
6 Jul 2024	16:45	Canberra Brave	6–4	Brisbane Lightning	Iceworld Boondall	
7 Jul 2024	15:45	Canberra Brave	1–2 (SO)	Brisbane Lightning	Iceworld Boondall	
14 Jul 2024	16:45	Central Coast Rhinos	2–7	Canberra Brave	Phillip Ice Skating Centre	
20 Jul 2024	15:30	Canberra Brave	6–1	Central Coast Rhinos	Erina Ice Arena	
27 Jul 2024	17:00	Canberra Brave	6–4	Sydney Bears	Macquarie Ice Rink	
3 Aug 2024	17:15	Central Coast Rhinos	2–7	Canberra Brave	Phillip Ice Skating Centre	
10 Aug 2024	17:15	Adelaide Adrenaline	2–3	Canberra Brave	Phillip Ice Skating Centre	
11 Aug 2024	16:45	Adelaide Adrenaline	1–6	Canberra Brave	Phillip Ice Skating Centre	

=== Finals ===
Goodall Cup Preliminary-final

23 August 2024; 19:00	Perth Thunder	1–2 (0–1, 1–0, 0–1)	Canberra Brave	O’Brien Icehouse

Game reference

(Canada) Leo Bertein
Goalies
(Australia) Aleksi Toivonen
Referees:
David Gal
Casper Russelhuber
Linesmen:
David Rehak
Russell Dow

	0 – 1	B.Kubara (Clark, Ratcliffe)
(Haselhurst, Vertes) Addison	1 – 1
	1 – 2	Clark (C.Kubara, Cangelosi)

6 min
Penalties
6 min
41
Shots
29

Goodall Cup semi-final

24 August 2024; 14:00	Canberra Brave	5–2 (0–0, 3–0, 2–2)	Sydney Bears	O’Brien Icehouse

Game reference

(Australia) Alex Tetreault
Goalies
(Australia) Anthony Kimlin
Referees:
Joey Theriault
Casper Russelhuber
Linesmen:
David Rehak
Jake O'Brien

(Unassisted) Maylan	1 – 0
(Harvey, Ratcliffe) Cangelosi	2 – 0
(B.Kubara, Cangelosi) T.Kubara	3 – 0
(Ratcliffe, Harvey) Cangelosi	4 – 0
	4 – 1	Herrmann (Brücker)
	4 – 2	Landa (Herrmann, Kushneriuk)
(Maylan) Clark	5 – 2

6 min
Penalties
8 min
31
Shots
44

Goodall Cup final

25 August 2024; 14:00	Melbourne Ice	0–5 (0–0, 0–5, 0–0)	Canberra Brave	O’Brien Icehouse

Game reference

(Japan) Tatsunoshin Ishida
Goalies
(Australia) Alex Tetreault
Referees:
David Gal
Joey Theriault
Linesmen:
David Rehak
Jake O'Brien

0 – 1	Ratcliffe (C.Kubara, Clark)
0 – 2	Harvey (T.Kubara)
0 – 3	C.Kubara (Ratcliffe, Cangelosi)
0 – 4	C.Kubara (Ratcliffe, Cangelosi)
0 – 5	Ratcliffe (B.Kubara, C.Kubara)

20 min
Penalties
14 min
29
Shots
33

== Awards ==
Team awards for 2024 season

2024 Brave awards
Award	Recipient
Bravest of the Brave	(New Zealand) Jake Ratcliffe
Best Forward	(United States) Austin Cangelosi
Best Defenceman	(Australia) Bayley Kubara
Fans Choice	(New Zealand) Jacob Carey
Player's Choice	(United States) Austin Cangelosi (Canada) Justin Maylan
Coach's Award	(New Zealand) Jacob Carey
Emerging Brave	(Australia) Bodhi Matthew
John Lewis Memorial Award	(Australia) Tom Letki
Deans Award	(Australia) Annie Abbott

AIHL awards for 2024 season

2024 AIHL awards
Award	Recipient
Finals MVP	(New Zealand) Jake Ratcliffe
