= Mike Blunden =

Canadian ice hockey player (born 1986)

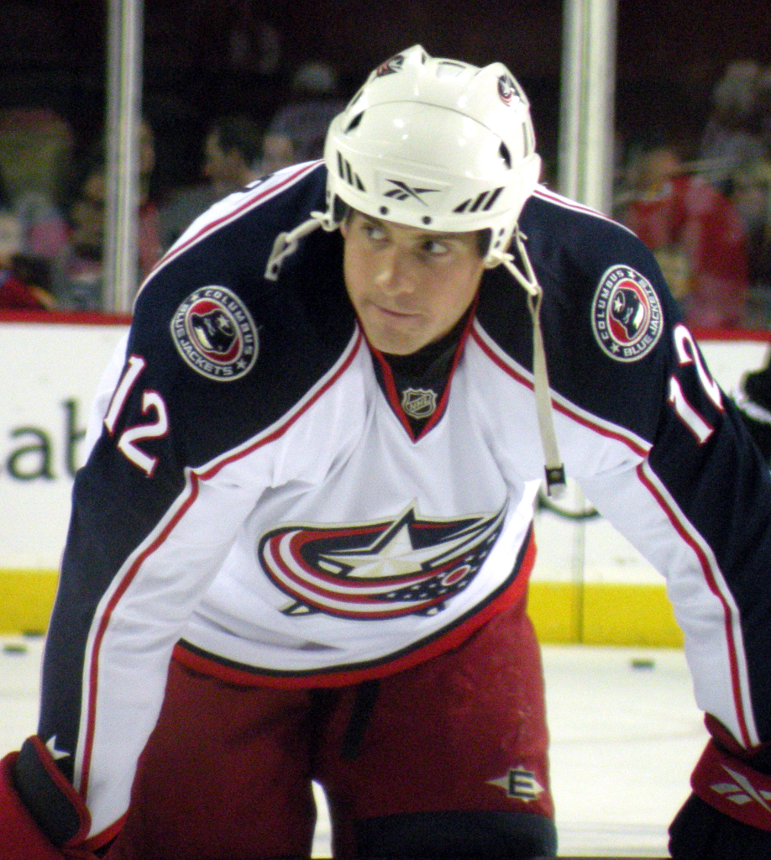
- Blunden with the Columbus Blue Jackets in 2009
- Born: December 15, 1986 (age 39) Toronto, Ontario, Canada
- Height: 6 ft 4 in (193 cm)
- Weight: 217 lb (98 kg; 15 st 7 lb)
- Position: Right wing
- Shot: Right
- Played for: Chicago Blackhawks; Columbus Blue Jackets; Montreal Canadiens; Tampa Bay Lightning; Ottawa Senators; HC Bolzano; Schwenninger Wild Wings
- NHL draft: 43rd overall, 2005; Chicago Blackhawks
- Playing career: 2006–2020

Michael Charles Blunden (born December 15, 1986) is a Canadian former professional ice hockey winger. Over his professional career, Blunden has appeared in over 100 National Hockey League (NHL) games with the Ottawa Senators, Tampa Bay Lightning, Montreal Canadiens, Columbus Blue Jackets and Chicago Blackhawks.

== Playing career ==
Blunden was drafted 43rd overall in the 2005 NHL entry draft by the Chicago Blackhawks from the Erie Otters of the Ontario Hockey League. After his final year with the Otters, Blunden signed a three-year entry-level contract with the Chicago Blackhawks on May 24, 2006. Months prior to signing he made his professional debut with affiliate of the Blackhawks, the Norfolk Admirals of the AHL, for the 2005–06 playoff run.

Blunden made his NHL debut in the 2006–07 season with the Blackhawks playing in 9 games. His season was cut short when he suffered a shoulder injury on December 10, 2006, ruling him out for the rest of the season.

On January 10, 2009, Blunden was traded by the Blackhawks to the Columbus Blue Jackets for Adam Pineault.

On July 7, 2011 he was traded from the Columbus Blue Jackets to the Montreal Canadiens, in exchange for Ryan Russell. On July 1, 2012, the Canadiens re-signed Blunden to a one-year, two-way contract extension.

On July 1, 2014, Blunden left the Canadiens organization to sign a one-year contract as a free agent with the Tampa Bay Lightning.

On June 29, 2015, the Lightning announced the re-signing of Blunden to a one-year, two-way contract. Blunden appeared in two regular season games with the Lightning last season, recording two penalty minutes. He also played in 33 games with the Syracuse Crunch, recording 13 goals and 22 points.

After two-years in the Lightning organization, Blunden left as a free agent to sign a two-year, two-way contract with the Ottawa Senators on July 1, 2016. After starting the season with Binghamton, Blunden made his Ottawa Senators debut on November 9, 2016 against the Buffalo Sabres.

After completing his contract with the Senators, Blunden left North America as a free agent after 13 years and signed a one-year deal with Italian outfit, HCB South Tyrol of the EBEL on July 18, 2018. Blunden contributed offensively with Bolzano, posting 33 points in 38 regular season games.

Following Bolzano's defeat in the playoffs, Blunden left as a free agent to sign in the neighbouring DEL, agreeing to a one-year contract with German club, Schwenninger Wild Wings on April 3, 2019.

== Personal ==
Blunden was born on December 15, 1986, in Toronto, Ontario, Canada. He has one sister, Jennifer Blunden, and two brothers, Stephen Blunden & Sean Blunden, both of whom are also hockey players with Stephen enjoying his time in Canberra, Australia with the CBR Brave in the AIHL and Sean playing in the CIS for the Concordia University team, Concordia Stingers.

== Career statistics ==
=== Regular season and playoffs ===
			Regular season					Playoffs
Season	Team	League	GP	G	A	Pts	PIM	GP	G	A	Pts	PIM
2001–02	Gloucester Rangers	CJHL	2	0	0	0	2	—	—	—	—	—
2002–03	Erie Otters	OHL	63	10	7	17	55	—	—	—	—	—
2003–04	Erie Otters	OHL	52	22	17	39	53	3	0	0	0	0
2004–05	Erie Otters	OHL	61	22	19	41	75	2	0	0	0	2
2005–06	Erie Otters	OHL	60	46	38	84	63	—	—	—	—	—
2005–06	Norfolk Admirals	AHL	11	1	5	6	2	1	0	0	0	0
2006–07	Norfolk Admirals	AHL	17	4	5	9	15	—	—	—	—	—
2006–07	Chicago Blackhawks	NHL	9	0	0	0	10	—	—	—	—	—
2007–08	Rockford IceHogs	AHL	74	16	21	37	83	12	1	3	4	35
2007–08	Chicago Blackhawks	NHL	1	0	0	0	0	—	—	—	—	—
2008–09	Rockford IceHogs	AHL	37	3	7	10	42	—	—	—	—	—
2008–09	Syracuse Crunch	AHL	39	9	12	21	68	—	—	—	—	—
2009–10	Columbus Blue Jackets	NHL	40	2	2	4	59	—	—	—	—	—
2009–10	Syracuse Crunch	AHL	25	7	9	16	43	—	—	—	—	—
2010–11	Springfield Falcons	AHL	37	12	9	21	41	—	—	—	—	—
2010–11	Columbus Blue Jackets	NHL	1	0	0	0	0	—	—	—	—	—
2011–12	Hamilton Bulldogs	AHL	17	3	5	8	12	—	—	—	—	—
2011–12	Montreal Canadiens	NHL	39	2	2	4	27	—	—	—	—	—
2012–13	Hamilton Bulldogs	AHL	54	10	12	22	76	—	—	—	—	—
2012–13	Montreal Canadiens	NHL	5	0	0	0	4	1	0	0	0	10
2013–14	Hamilton Bulldogs	AHL	68	18	19	37	79	—	—	—	—	—
2013–14	Montreal Canadiens	NHL	7	0	0	0	5	—	—	—	—	—
2014–15	Syracuse Crunch	AHL	33	13	9	22	28	—	—	—	—	—
2014–15	Tampa Bay Lightning	NHL	2	0	0	0	2	—	—	—	—	—
2015–16	Syracuse Crunch	AHL	49	21	17	38	68	—	—	—	—	—
2015–16	Tampa Bay Lightning	NHL	20	3	2	5	34	7	0	0	0	4
2016–17	Binghamton Senators	AHL	67	14	15	29	57	—	—	—	—	—
2016–17	Ottawa Senators	NHL	2	0	0	0	4	—	—	—	—	—
2017–18	Belleville Senators	AHL	45	6	10	16	95	—	—	—	—	—
2017–18	Ottawa Senators	NHL	1	0	0	0	0	—	—	—	—	—
2018–19	HC Bolzano	AUT	38	16	17	33	32	5	2	3	5	33
2019–20	Schwenninger Wild Wings	DEL	49	13	10	23	36	—	—	—	—	—
AHL totals			573	137	155	292	709	13	1	3	4	35
NHL totals			127	7	6	13	145	8	0	0	0	14

=== International ===
Year	Team	Event	Result	GP	G	A	Pts	PIM
2003	Canada	U18	4th	5	1	1	2	8
2006	Canada	WJC	1st place, gold medalist(s)	6	2	3	5	8
Junior totals				11	3	4	7	16
