= Dominic Jalbert =

Canadian ice hockey player (born 1989)

- Born: August 2, 1989 (age 35); Hull, Quebec, Canada
- Height: 5 ft 10 in (178 cm)
- Weight: 168 lb (76 kg; 12 st 0 lb)
- Position: Defence
- Shot: Left
- Played for: Reading Royals; Jonquière Marquis; Saint-Georges Cool FM 103.5; Brûleurs de Loups; Chamonix HC; CBR Brave; Anglet Hormadi Élite; Thetford Assurancia
- NHL draft: Undrafted
- Playing career: 2006–2020

Dominic Jalbert (born August 2, 1989) is a Canadian former professional ice hockey defenceman. He played with the University of Ottawa in the Ontario University Athletics (OUA). Prior to his University career, Jalbert played four seasons with the Chicoutimi Saguenéens in the QMJHL.

== Awards and honours ==
- CHL Scholastic Player of the Year (2010–11)
