= List of CBR Brave seasons =

The CBR Brave are an Australian ice hockey franchise that compete in the Australian Ice Hockey League (AIHL). The Brave are based in Australia’s capital city, Canberra, and to date have played all its home games at Phillip Ice Centre since its founding in 2014. In four completed seasons, the team has yet to win a Goodall Cup championship and has qualified for the AIHL finals weekend four times. As of the end of the 2017 season, the Brave have won more than 50 regular-season games, scored more than 490 regular-season goals and accumulated more than 190 regular-season points.

CBR won their first major title in 2018 by clinching the H Newman Reid Trophy by finishing first in the 2018 AIHL regular-season standings.

== Table Legend ==
A	Number of assists by a player in a season
Finish	Final position in league standings at conclusion of regular-season
G	Number of goals by a player in a season
GA	Goals against (goals scored by the Brave's opponents)
GD	Goal difference (the positive, even or negative difference between goals for and goals against)
GF	Goals for (goals scored by the Brave)
Goodall Cup final	Details of Goodall Cup final matches played
L	Number of losses
OL	Number of losses in overtime/shootout
OW	Number of wins in overtime/shootout
P	Number of games played
PIM	Penalties in minutes (penalty minutes served by a player)
Pts	Number of points
Result	Final position in Finals weekend
Semi-final	Details of semi-final matches played
T	Number of ties
W	Number of wins

== Year by Year ==
CBR Brave All-time Record
Season	Regular season											Finals								Top points		Top goals		Top assists		Top penalties		Goaltender	Head coach
Season	P	W	T	L	OW	OL	GF	GA	GD	Pts	Finish	P	W	L	GF	GA	Result	Semi Final	Goodall Cup Final	Name	Pts	Name	G	Name	A	Name	PIM	Name	Name
2014	28	14	1 (Note: CBR Brave and Adelaide Adrenaline were each awarded one point each and officially recorded a tie on 19 July 2014 despite there being no ties in the AIHL since the introduction of the shootout in 2006 due to a bus crash involving the travelling Adelaide players and staff en route to Canberra.)	9	2	2	106	89	+17	49	3rd	1	–	1	1	6	Semi-finalist	Lost 1-6 (Ice)	–	(Canada) S.Blunden	68	(Canada) S.Blunden	36	(Finland) A.Kokkonen	42	(Australia) H.Byers	111	(Finland) P.Pitkänen	(Australia) Matti Louma
2015	28	13	–	10	3	2	125	104	+21	47	4th	1	–	1	3	4	Semi-finalist	Lost 3-4 (North Stars)	–	(Canada) S.Blunden	79	(Canada) S.Blunden (Canada) K.Geoffrey	28	(Canada) S.Blunden	51	(Australia) D.Dunwoodie	120	(United States) J.Unice	(Australia) Brad Hunt (United States) Josh Unice
2016	28	15	–	9	2	2	129	117	+12	51	4th	2	1	1	5	5	Runner-up	Won 4-3 (Ice)	Lost 1-2 (North Stars)	(Canada) G.Wudrick	50	(Canada) S.Blunden (Canada) G.Wudrick	20	(Australia) C.Kubara	33	(Australia) H.Byers	108	(Australia) A.Toivonen	(United States) Josh Unice (Canada) Art Bidlevskii
2017	28	13	–	11	3	1	130	101	+29	46	3rd	2	1	1	7	6	Runner-up	Won 6-2 (Thunder)	Lost 1-4 (Ice)	(Canada) G.Wudrick	54	(Canada) S.Blunden	24	(Canada) D.Jalbert	37	(Australia) M.Buskas	90	(Australia) A.Toivonen	(Australia) Rob Starke
2018	28	24	–	4	–	–	152	74	+78	72	1st	2	2	–	9	4	Champion	Won 5-1 (Mustangs)	Won 4-3 (OT) (Bears)	(United States) T.Gerling	67	(United States) T.Gerling	24	(United States) T.Gerling	43	(Australia) D.Göransson	65	(Canada) M.Hewitt	(Australia) Rob Starke
2019	28	26	–	1	–	1	161	67	+94	79	1st	1	–	1	4	6	Semi-finalist	Lost 4-6 (Bears)	–	(Canada) J.Gaberille	67	(Canada) J.Gabrielle	39	(Australia) W.Darge	34	(Australia) H.Dawes	69	(Canada) M.Climie	(Australia) Rob Starke
2020	2020 and 2021 AIHL seasons were cancelled and not contested
2021	2020 and 2021 AIHL seasons were cancelled and not contested
2022	18	15	–	2	–	1	141	56	+85	49	1st	2	2	–	9	3	Champion	Won 6-1 (Northstars)	Won 3-2 (Northstars)	(Australia) C.Kubara	52	(Australia) C.Kubara	25	(Australia) W.Darge	33	(Australia) J.Hughes	51	(Australia) A.Tetreault	(Australia) Stuart Philps
2023	26	20	–	4	1	1	170	77	+93	63	1st	2	1	1	4	2	Runner-up	Won 4-1 (Thunder)	Lost 0-1 (Mustangs)	(United States) A.Albrecht	76	(United States) A.Albrecht	39	(Canada) F.Plouffe	44	(Australia) M.Giorgi	45	(Australia) A.Tetreault (Australia) A.Toivonen	(Australia) Stuart Philps
2024	–	–	–	–	–	–	–	–	–	–	–	–	–	–	–	–	–	–	–	–	–	–	–	–	–	–	–	–	(Australia) Stuart Philps
Totals	212	140	1	50	11	10	1114	685	+429			13	7	6	42	36

Key:

Champions	Runners-up	Third place

As of 1 September 2023
