= Stephen Blunden =

Canadian ice hockey player

- Born: April 5, 1989 (age 37) Ottawa, Ontario, Canada
- Height: 6 ft 2 in (188 cm)
- Weight: 194 lb (88 kg; 13 st 12 lb)
- Position: Forward / Left winger
- Shoots: Left
- AIHL team Former teams: CBR Brave; HC Cholet; Ottawa Gee-Gees
- Playing career: 2011–present
- Website: AIHL profile

Stephen Blunden (born 5 April 1989) is a Canadian semi-professional ice hockey forward or left winger who plays for CBR Brave in the Australian Ice Hockey League in Australia. A Canadian youth product, Blunden has risen through the Canadian league and university system with Gloucester Rangers, Belleville Bulls, Ottawa 67’s and the University of Ottawa. In 2014 Stephen expanded his hockey career by linking up with Australian phoenix club CBR Brave. During the AIHL off-season Stephen linked up with French second division side HC Cholet before returning to the Brave for the 2015 AIHL season.

== Playing career ==
=== Youth career ===
Blunden had an extensive youth career in the Ontario Hockey League ( OHL ) & Canadian Junior Hockey League ( CJHL ) with a number of different clubs in Ontario, Canada including Gloucester Rangers, Belleville Bulls and Ottawa 67’s u20's between 2004 and 2010. Blunden's youth career was capped off by being named captain by the Gloucester Rangers in 2009/2010 CJHL season where Stephen bagged 90 points with 22 goals and 68 assists in 54 matches.

=== University career ===
In 2010 Stephen moved to the University of Ottawa and started playing for the university team, Ottawa Gee-Gees, in the Canadian Interuniversity Sport men's ice hockey ( CIS ). Blunden spent four seasons with the Gee-Gees, playing regularly and participated in the play-offs in three of those four seasons. In Blunden's last season in the CIS he was selected in the 2013-2014 CIS ( OUA East ) First all-star team.

=== CBR Brave ===
4 April 2014, CBR Brave announced the import signing of Stephen Blunden along with teammate Mathieu Ouellette from the University of Ottawa. The Canadian pair were the second and third import signings for the new club from Canberra and the first offensive signings. Upon signing Blunden made it clear he was excited to experience the Australian lifestyle and culture and had this to say:

Being from Ottawa, we don’t have the luxury of being close to any beautiful beaches along the coast so I would love to try and take up surfing.

It did not take long for Blunden to adjust to life in Australia with Brave and he quickly established himself as one of the AIHL's best offensive weapons. After just eight games Stephen had amassed eleven goals and assists for a combined total of twenty two points. Stephen's combination play with Mathieu Ouellette and Finnish teammate Anton Kokkonen was attributed to the rapid rise in the league table by the Brave. During an interview with Lee Gaskin for the Canberra Times in June Blunden had this to say about life in the Australian capital and the AIHL:

I had a few buddies in the past play here and they said they had a great experience, so I emailed Canberra and started talking with [coach Matti Luoma] and he convinced me to come. It's surpassed my expectations, the games get pretty physical, pretty quick. At first our line struggled, our first two shifts we got scored against both times, but after that we really gelled.

By 24 July 2014, Blunden was one point off his second successive fifty point season after scoring twenty points in seven games. Stephen's firepower had the Brave hunting for a top four finish in the league and an AIHL Finals birth that would give a Canberra club the first chance at securing the Goodall Cup since the ACT lifted the cup in 1998.

Blunden finished his inaugural regular AIHL season with him assisting the team to a third finish and qualifying for the AIHL Finals weekend and a shot at the Goodall Cup. Blunden had proven the early season hype correct by finishing the season as the second top points scorer in the league leading players table with a total of 68 points collected from 36 goals and 32 assists giving Stephen the best points per game score of 2.8 in the AIHL for the 2014 season. For his efforts Stephen was named CBR Brave Best Forward that was given out at the maiden Brave Awards Presentation Night at the Woden Tradies Club, Phillip, ACT.

On 30 August 2014, Blunden along with his teammates experienced the disappointment of sudden-death elimination in the AIHL Finals held at Medibank Icehouse in Docklands, Victoria with a demolition 6–1 defeat at the hands of Melbourne Ice.

10 September 2014, On conclusion of the 2014 AIHL season, Blunden returned to North America to seek a new challenge in his hockey career and was signed by professional club Tulsa Oilers from the ECHL in the United States. However, by October 23, 2014, Blunden was released by the Oilers without making an apperience for the club.

After being released by Tulsa Oilers Blunden signed on with HC Cholet in the professional French second division ( FFHG Division 1 ). Stephen played sixteen games for Cholet, known as the Dogs, and scored nineteen points with eight goals and eleven assists while racking up a large number of penalty minutes ( 80 minutes ).

23 March 2015, Before the start of the 2015 AIHL season the CBR Brave announced the re-signing of Stephen Blunden after securing an early release of his Cholet contract. Blunden linked up with the Brave in round two of the season and made his 2015 return debut for the Brave against the Newcastle North Stars, scoring two goals and getting an assist as the Brave succumbed to the North Stars 7–4 in Newcastle at the Hunter Ice Skating Stadium.

After the first six games of the 2015 season Lee Gaskin sat down with Stephen for another interview to talk about the reasons why Stephen returned to Canberra given he was the only import player to return to the CBR Brave for their second season.

"I don't think people give Canberra the respect it deserves," Blunden said. "I love the city, the fans are great, it's just fun playing hockey here.

"It's a great group of guys, we all just come together and gel so well, we all work hard for each other and stand up for each other. Almost every night we're hanging out even if it's away from the rink and they're just fun to be around."

Blunden played with Cholet in France, but said Australian ice hockey could stand its ground.

"I think it's a lot rougher here than it is over in Europe. The refs let a lot more go, which is fine by me. I like it, it's a lot more fun, it gets the fans behind the game."

== Personal ==
Blunden was born on April 5, 1989, in Gloucester, Ontario, Canada. He has one sister, Jennifer Blunden, and two brothers, Mike Blunden & Sean Blunden, both of whom are also hockey players with Mike drafted in the NHL by Chicago Blackhawks in 2005 and Sean playing in the CIS for the Concordia University team, Concordia Stingers.

== Career statistics ==
=== Regular season and playoffs ===
| | | | Regular season | | | | | Playoffs |
| Season | Team | League | GP | G | A | Pts | PIM | GP | G | A | Pts | PIM |
|---|---|---|---|---|---|---|---|---|---|---|---|---|
| 2004–05 | Gloucester Rangers Midget AA | OEMHL AA | 33 | 13 | 15 | 28 | 16 | — | — | — | — | — |
| 2005–06 | Belleville Bulls | OHL | 4 | 0 | 1 | 1 | 2 | — | — | — | — | — |
| 2005–06 | Hawkesbury Hawks | CJHL | 11 | 1 | 1 | 2 | 4 | 16 | 1 | 1 | 2 | 8 |
| 2006–07 | Belleville Bulls | OHL | 56 | 2 | 3 | 5 | 44 | 15 | 0 | 1 | 1 | 4 |
| 2007–08 | Belleville Bulls | OHL | 37 | 5 | 4 | 9 | 19 | 10 | 2 | 0 | 2 | 2 |
| 2008–09 | Belleville Bulls | OHL | 11 | 1 | 1 | 2 | 8 | — | — | — | — | — |
| 2008–09 | Ottawa 67's | OHL | 52 | 7 | 14 | 21 | 10 | 7 | 1 | 2 | 3 | 4 |
| 2009–10 | Gloucester Rangers | CJHL | 54 | 22 | 68 | 90 | 106 | 3 | 1 | 0 | 1 | 8 |
| 2010–11 | Ottawa Gee-Gees | CIS | 16 | 4 | 11 | 15 | 26 | 2 | 0 | 1 | 1 | 4 |
| 2011–12 | Ottawa Gee-Gees | CIS | 27 | 13 | 9 | 22 | 60 | — | — | — | — | — |
| 2012–13 | Ottawa Gee-Gees | CIS | 15 | 10 | 10 | 20 | 22 | 6 | 0 | 2 | 2 | 46 |
| 2013–14 | Ottawa Gee-Gees | CIS | 24 | 14 | 20 | 34 | 49 | 2 | 0 | 2 | 2 | 10 |
| 2014 | CBR Brave | AIHL | 24 | 36 | 32 | 68 | 59 | 1 | 1 | 0 | 1 | 6 |
| 2014–15 | HC Cholet | Div1 | 16 | 8 | 11 | 19 | 80 | — | — | — | — | — |
| 2015 | CBR Brave | AIHL | 24 | 28 | 51 | 79 | 46 | 1 | 2 | 1 | 3 | 25 |
| 2016 | CBR Brave | AIHL | 14 | 20 | 17 | 37 | 99 | 1 | 0 | 1 | 1 | 2 |
| AIHL totals | | | 62 | 84 | 100 | 184 | 204 | 3 | 3 | 2 | 5 | 33 |

== Awards and honours ==
Personal

- 2013-2014 CIS ( OUA East ) First all-star team
- 2014 CBR Brave Best Forward
- 2014 AIHL Top Goal Scorer ( 36 goals )
- 2015 CBR Brave Best Forward
- 2015 CBR Brave Highest points scorer
- 2015 CBR Brave Most Valuable Player

Club

- 2014 AIHL Goodall Cup Semi Finalists
- 2015 AIHL Goodall Cup Semi Finalists
- 2016 AIHL Goodall Cup Finalists
