= Canberra Brave =

- City: Canberra, Australian Capital Territory
- League: Australian Ice Hockey League
- Conference: Rurak
- Founded: 5 March 2014 (12 years ago)
- Operated: 2014–present
- Home arena: AIS Arena
- Colours: Black, white, gold
- Owner: Cruachan Investments (Stephen Campbell)
- CEO: (Australia) Stephen Campbell
- General manager: (Australia) Jordie Gavin
- Head coach: (Australia) Stuart Philps
- Captain: (Australia) Kai Miettinen
- Affiliates: Junior Brave
- Website: brave.theaihl.com

Franchise history
- 2014 - 2023: CBR Brave
- 2024 - present: Canberra Brave

Championships
- Conference titles: 1 (2023)
- H Newman Reid Trophies: 4 (2018, 2019, 2022, 2023)
- Goodall Cups: 3 (2018, 2022, 2024)

Current uniform
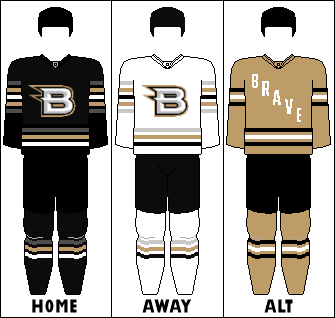

The Canberra Brave (formally CBR Brave) is a semi-professional ice hockey team based in Canberra, ACT. The team is a member of the Australian Ice Hockey League (AIHL). The team was founded in 2014 to replace the defunct Canberra Knights in the AIHL. As of the 2025 season, their home venue is AIS Arena. The Brave have claimed three Goodall Cup championships and four H Newman Reid Trophy premierships.

== History ==
The Canberra Brave was founded in March 2014 as the CBR Brave to replace the Canberra Knights in the Australian Ice Hockey League (AIHL).

On 26 February 2014 Knights owner, John Raut, handed back his AIHL licence and folded the team after 33 years of existence citing financial costs, lack of a local player pool and sustained poor performances for the reason he came to this decision.

Immediately following the collapse of the Knights, a player group led consortium approached the AIHL with a proposal to take over the vacated licence and form a new team in Canberra. The AIHL was open to the idea, stating it was important for the development of the sport in Australia for there to be a Canberra team. The AIHL laid down three stipulations and requirements for the consortium to meet before granting the team entry. Firstly, a signed home venue agreement, secondly, ability to field a competitive team for the upcoming season and lastly, to prove the team would be financially viable. Upon meeting these requirements the league and teams voted to grant the consortium a provisional twelve-month licence to compete in the 2014 AIHL season.

On 6 March 2014, CBR Brave is born under the guidance of new owners Allinsure director Peter Chamberlain and advertising firm Coordinate's owner-director Jamie Wilson after the pair got in contact with Mark Rummukainen, head of the player consortium.

On 15 March 2014, The Brave management in conjunction with co-owner Jamie Wilson's design firm, Coordinate, revealed their team brand and logo, a stylised version of the word "Brave".

=== 2014 inaugural season ===
On 31 March 2014, CBR Brave announced their first ever import signing with the acquisition of twenty-two-year-old Finnish goaltender Petri Pitkänen from Finnish third division champions KeuPa HT. Petri proved a huge success as the Brave's number one goaltender in the 2014 season alongside fellow successful imports Anton Kokkonen, Stephen Blunden and Mathieu Ouellette who finished 1, 2 and 3 in the Brave player statistics leader board, which equated to 2, 3 and 4 for the entire league.

On 12 April 2014, The Brave took to the ice in their maiden AIHL match at home in front of around 1000 fans against the Newcastle North Stars. The visitors won the match 2-0 but the match was described by the media as a major win for the city of Canberra as the CBR Brave did not exist a few weeks prior and it took a community led miracle of sorts to get the new team up off the ground and onto the ice thanks to a successful community and fan led fundraising campaign that raised over $27,000.

26 April 2014, Round 3, In their second match after a bye in round 2, the Brave registered their inaugural victory in the AIHL regular season with a 6–2 victory over the then reigning champions Sydney Ice Dogs with a break-out third period domination at home in front of a sold-out crowd of 1000 people.

On 10 August 2014, The Brave secured a top four finish in the AIHL regular season by coming third in the overall rankings, granting them a place in the 2014 AIHL Goodall Cup Finals Series held at Medibank Icehouse in Docklands, Victoria. It is the first time a Canberra team has made the finals series since the AIHL was formed in 2000 and the first time a Canberra team had a shot at securing the Goodall Cup since 1998.

On 23 August 2014, The Brave hosted their 2014 season presentation night at the Woden Tradies Club where Finnish goaltender Petri Pitkänen took out the inaugural MVP (Most Valuable Player) award, the top prize for the season. In other awards, Mathieu Ouellette was named best two-way player, Stephen Blunden was named best forward and Matt Harvey took out the best defender award. Aaron Clayworth clinched both players' player and coaches' award, Anton Kokkonen was named fan's choice while captain Mark Rummukainen took home the John Lewis Memorial Award. The final award for the night went to young gun Kai Miettinen who was named best u23 player. Petri Pitkänen and Mathieu Ouellette were also shortlisted for league awards, Mathieu missed out on the top honour but Petri was selected as the AIHL Goaltender of 2014.

30 August 2014, The Brave lost their semi-final match to the Melbourne Ice 6–1 in front of 1,500 fans, ending their inaugural season in the process.

=== 2015 season ===
On 30 January 2015, Brave announce the appointment of Brad Hunt as the new head coach for the 2015 AIHL season. Brad was originally going to take on the assistant coach role for 2015 after hanging up the skates at the end of the 2014 season but with former head coach Matti Louma leaving the club to take on a development coaching position in Perth, Hunt was promoted to head coach instead.

On 9 February 2015, 2015 AIHL season draw changes, originally released 4 December 2014, affected the CBR Brave with an additional three games to be played in Canberra for the 2015 season after the Sydney Bears and Sydney Ice Dogs opted to play their home games against the Brave in Canberra instead of Sydney. This resulted in 17 home games for the Brave in 2015 as opposed to the standard 14.

On 31 March 2015, CBR Brave in conjunction with Ice Hockey ACT announced the formation of the Junior Brave to compete in the 2015 NSW Midget League. The team is coached by former AIHL player and Australian representative Andrew Brunt. The Junior Brave are the first Canberra-based team to compete in the NSW Midget League since 2011 when Canberra Phoenix left the league. In their inaugural year, the Junior Brave were runners up, beating the Canterbury Eagles 3–2 in the semi-final and losing the final to defending champions, the Liverpool Saints 3–1. Three of the Junior Brave players made their debut with the CBR Brave in the AIHL – goalie Alexandre Tetrault, and forwards Jayden Lewis and Jordon Brunt. Alexandre Tetrault was also selected to represent Australia in the Under 20 World Championships in Serbia in 2016.

On 14 July 2015, CBR Brave Chairman Peter Chamberlain confirmed the mutual separation between the team and head coach Brad Hunt with immediate effect. On ice performances during the 2015 AIHL regular season and future planning were cited as the main reasons for the decision. In the same statement the Board confirmed current first choice import goaltender, Josh Unice, would take over as head coach on an interim basis for the remainder of the 2015 AIHL season including finals. Veteran defenceman, Aaron Clayworth, would join Josh in moving from the player roster to the coaching staff by taking over as assistant coach. A committee was established to oversee the selection process of a permanent head coach for the 2016 AIHL season.

On 16 August 2015, The CBR Brave officially secured fourth place in the AIHL regular season to give the team a birth in the 2015 AIHL Finals and a second shot at the Goodall Cup in as many seasons. This came about as a result of a shootout victory over the top team Newcastle North Stars 6–5 at the Brave Cave, Canberra, ACT, when Jordan Gavin slotted home in sudden death as well as other results going the Brave's way.

The following weekend, 22 August 2015, the CBR Brave played their final match of the 2015 AIHL regular season away to the last placed Sydney Ice Dogs at the Phillip Ice Skating Centre, as the Ice Dogs moved their home match to Canberra. With the Brave guaranteed to finish fourth and the Ice Dogs to finish last the match was a dead rubber. Both Stephen Blunden and Kelly Geoffrey finished the match with six points as Blunden fired in 4 goals and 2 assists with Kelly achieving the opposite. Veteran forward, Ryan Johnson, grabbed the buzzer beating final goal in the third period with seventeen seconds to go to send the Brave into the Finals on the back of a 7–2 victory. The win also officially cemented the Brave's fourth-place finish in the 2015 AIHL season. One place and two points behind their inaugural season's finish, an amazing finish considering before Josh Unice took over the team was second last and after Unice took over the team won six of seven games.

On 23 August 2015, the Brave hosted their annual 'Brave Ball' gala evening at the Woden Tradies Club at which the 2015 season team awards were handed out. Stephen Blunden headed the awards night with three awards (Bravest of the Brave, Best Forward, Highest Point Scorer) with Jimmy Byers following closely behind with two awards (Emerging Brave, Fans Choice). Rounding out the awards Ryan Johnson won the John Lewis Memorial Award for the most dedicated player of the season on and off the ice, Best Defender went to Kyle Mariani, Mark Rummukainen won the Player's Player while Kai Miettinen and Peter Taylor shared the Coaches' Award. At the same event the Brave announced the formation of the CBR Brave Foundation to better connect the team to the local community and charities.

On 29 August 2015, in front of 1,200 passionate fans, the CBR Brave took on the league premiers, Newcastle North Stars, in game one (semi-final one) of the 2015 AIHL Finals. The Brave controlled the first two periods of the match that produced two shorthanded goals to Kelly Geoffrey and Stephen Blunden before Blunden got his second of the match in the second period to put the Brave up 3–0. The North Stars finally got on the score sheet in the second period on the power play as the Brave continued to get into penalty strife. The third period saw a complete change in the match with Newcastle dominating and league MVP Geordie Wudrick coming out and scoring a hat trick to send the premiers through to the grand final and knock the Brave out of the Finals at the same stage as the season before. Aleksi Toivonen and Stephen Blunden were selected as 2nd and 3rd Stars of the game.

=== 2016 season ===
The Brave were sufficiently impressed with Josh Unice's interim stint to hand him the permanent head coaching role with a three-year contract on 9 March 2016. The experienced Dave Rogina was retained as assistant coach and Stuart Philips was brought in as strength and conditioning coach. Six imports were confirmed in the 2016 Brave roster, which was released on 12 April 2016. The core group of Australian players were retained from 2015. The headline addition to the roster was Canadian forward Geordie Wudrick, who joined from rivals Newcastle Northstars. Wudrick joined the Brave as current AIHL MVP after he broke the league's points and goals records in 2015 with Newcastle. A few days later, on 18 April 2016, the Brave announced a new cooperative partnership with Canberra's Australian Baseball League team, the Canberra Cavalry. Member benefits would extend between fans of the two teams and joint marketing opportunities between the two organisations would be explored. Further expanding the Brave's local partnership program, the team further agreed to a mutually beneficial partnership with the Australian Defence Force hockey team the Navy Tigersharks. Announced pre-game on 23 April 2016, the new partnership looked to promote ice hockey within the Australian Defence community and assist in establishing a development pathway for emerging talent.

Canberra opened the 2016 season with a 5–2 victory over the Sydney Ice Dogs at the Brave Cave. The Brave's new imports, Wudrick, Brandi and Prokop, made instant impacts for the team, scoring four goals. Australian rookie, Casey Kubara, also scored his first AIHL goal. Unice reserved special praise post-game for the debut defensive display of Adelaide-born youngster, Zach Boyle. In the first game of the season between the Brave and North Stars, Canadian import Art Bidlevskii suffored a freak accident that left him in hospital with a broken throat. Bidlevskii was advised to never play hockey again or risk being placed in a coma and losing his life. He retired as a player and took a position as assistant coach for the Brave. With the Brave fighting for the league premiership in the top half of the standings, it surprised the Canberra hockey community when the Brave announced the immediate departure of head coach Josh Unice, one week out from Finals on 17 August 2016. 'Personal reasons' was given for the sudden departure. CBR Brave director, Warren Apps, announced ex-player and current assistant coach, Art Bidlevskii, would take on the head coaching role on an interim bases for the remainder of the season. The Brave suffered a surprise 4–6 defeat to last placed Ice Dogs in the final game of the regular season at Liverpool, Sydney on 20 August 2016. The result was enough for Canberra to secure a top four finish and qualify for the AIHL Finals for the third year running.

On 27 August 2016, the Brave commenced their Goodall Cup tilt with a win over home team favourites Melbourne Ice, defeating the Ice 4–3 in overtime. The game was marked with dramatic goals by both teams. First, the Ice sent the game into overtime with a dramatic last-minute goal by Lasse Lassen. His shot was first deemed to have hit the bar and the game continued, but the referees and linespeople then conferred together and decided it was a goal. Lastly, the game-winning goal in overtime was scored by Brave defender Jan Safar as he stepped back into the ice from the penalty box to give the Brave a quick breakaway and a golden goal. This was the first time the Brave had won an AIHL Finals game or progressed to the Goodall Cup Final. The following day, on 28 August 2016, the Brave lined up against bitter rivals Newcastle North Stars for a shot at winning the AIHL Championship title and lifting the historic Goodall Cup. A slow start to the game for the Brave cost the team dearly, as they could not claw back from 2–0 down. A third period goal to Wudrick against his old team proved nothing more than a consolation for Canberra. Newcastle claimed the title and hoisted the Goodall Cup for the second year in a row.

Following the end of the season, on 12 September 2016, two Brave players claimed three AIHL season awards. Jan Safar was named AIHL Defenceman of the year. Casey Kubara was named both local player and rookie of the year. In November, the Brave were named finalists for the innovation award at the inaugural CBR Sports Awards alongside Tennis ACT, Ginninderra Athletics Club and Touch Football ACT. The Brave then narrowly lost the innovation award to Ginniderra Athletics Club at the award ceremony on 11 November 2016.

=== 2017-21 ===
The CBR Brave commenced a new direction in 2017. On 23 January 2017, the team appointed a new head coach. Former Newcastle Northstars player Rob Starke took the reins for his first coaching position since retiring as a player at the end of 2016. It was a controversial appointment given the fierce rivalry and animosity between the two teams. The Brave qualified for Finals again in 2017, finishing third in the regular season behind the Melbourne Ice and Perth Thunder. Canberra then defeated the Thunder 6–2 in the semi-finals in Melbourne. However, they were defeated 1–4 in the Goodall Cup Final by the Melbourne Ice in front of a packed arena of Ice fans. It was the Brave's second straight grand final loss. Following the conclusion of the season, on 3 September 2017, CBR Brave's all-time leading points scorer, Stephen Blunden, announced his departure from the team to return to his native Canada.

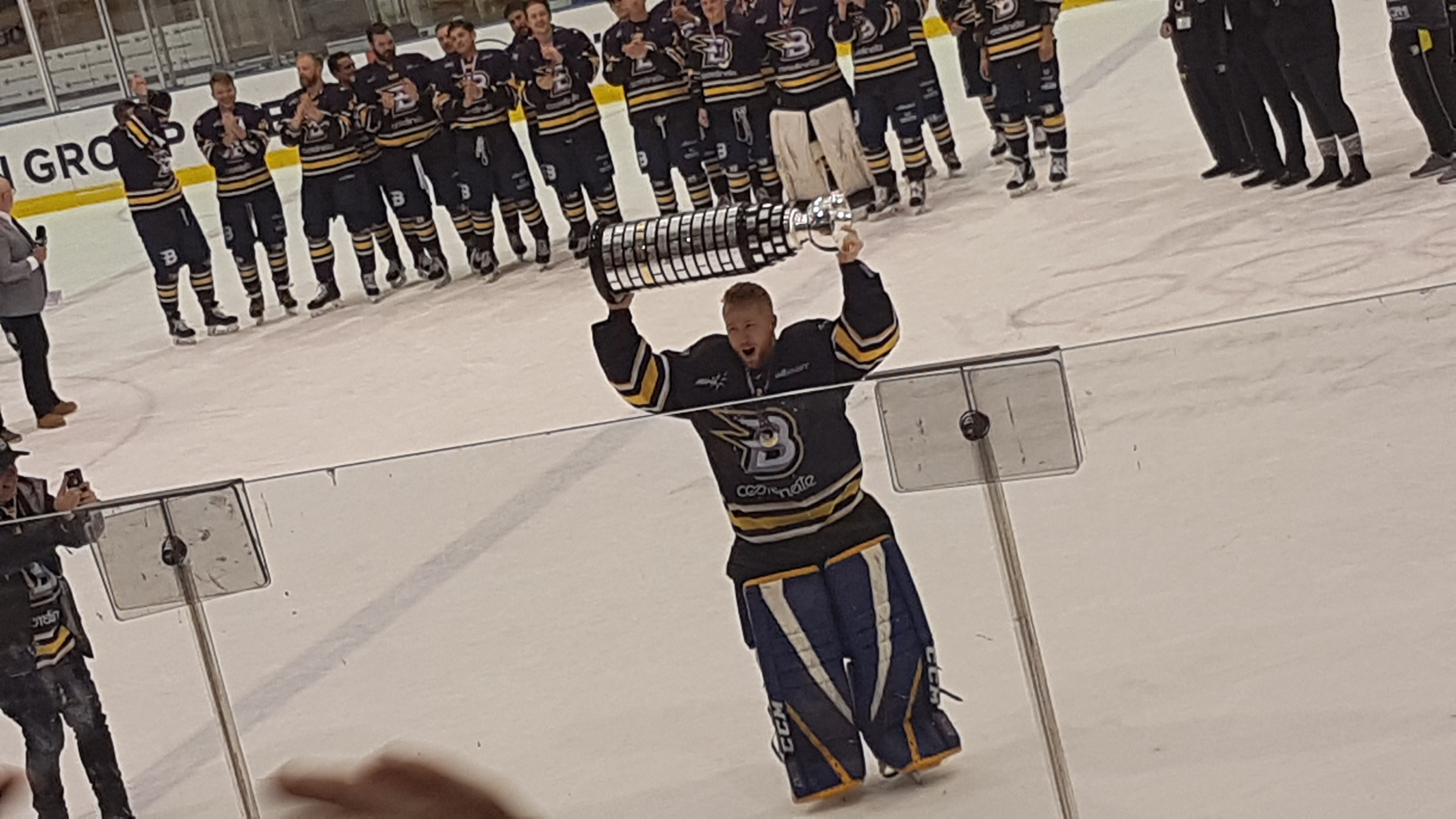
Canadian import goaltender, Matt Hewitt, hoists the Goodall Cup trophy in 2018 after helping the CBR Brave beat the Sydney Bears 4–3 in overtime in the final at the Icehouse, Melbourne

The 2018 AIHL season saw the CBR Brave break AIHL records for most wins and points in a single season on their way to topping the league standings. The Brave secured top spot in the league with five games remaining in the regular season and ended the season with twenty four wins from twenty eight matches for a return of seventy two points. The Brave ended the regular season eighteen points ahead of the Sydney Bears in second place to clinch the franchise's first title, the H Newman Reid Trophy. In the 2018 Finals Weekend the CBR Brave defeated the Melbourne Mustangs 5–1 in the first semi-final on Saturday 1 September 2018 to qualify for the Goodall Cup Final the following day. On 2 September 2018, the Brave faced-off against the Sydney Bears in the final and were victorious in overtime with a 4–3 victory. The Brave led the match 2–0 after the first period but the Bears fought back in the second period and took the lead into the second break 3–2. The Brave levelled the match in the third period before scoring the golden goal winner in overtime. The Brave became the first Canberra based ice hockey franchise to lift the Goodall Cup and the second Canberra based team overall, following the ACT representative team's victory in 1998. Canberra Brave's Dave and Jayden Lewis became the first father-son duo in Australian Ice Hockey League history to lift the Goodall Cup. American import forward, Trevor Gerling, finished equal top points scorer in the league. Canadian import goaltender, Matt Hewitt, finished top in the league goaltender standings and Australian international, Wahebe Darge, won the AIHL best local player award for 2018. Foundation player, Jordie Gavin who was instrumental in building the CBR Brave following the collapse of the Canberra Knights, retired after the 2018 AIHL final, his first Goodall Cup success.

Big changes in 2019 for the Brave. The team ownership changed for the first time on 28 March 2019. Inaugural consortium (Chamberlain, Wilson and Apps) reached agreement with Canberra Cavalry consortium (Amodio and McMichael) for the sale. The two franchises merged to create Canberra's first single multi-sport organisation. Resources were pooled together, enabling a year-round professional administrative office, a first for an AIHL team. The ownership transition was staggered with the original consortium continuing to run the Brave for the remainder of 2019. On the ice in 2019, the Brave won 26 of 28 games to win the premiership and lift the H Newman Reid Trophy for the second time. In a dominant performance, the Brave finished 25 points ahead of second place Newcastle Northstars. Canberra broke many AIHL and team records in 2019, including: most wins (26), most points (79), largest winning streak (17 games), most goals scored (161), fewest goals conceded in a 28-game season (67) and least losses in a 28-game season (2). However, regular season dominance did not translate to success in Finals in 2019. The Brave were eliminated early with a 4–6 defeat to the Sydney Bears in the semi-finals.

The new ownership took control in 2020 with Amodio and McMichael taking prominent executive positions within the team. On 24 February 2020, Rob Starke left the Brave to return home to Canada. He left having guided the team to their first trophies and a win percentage of over 77%. A few days later, on 27 February 2020, the Brave announced Starke's successor, Stuart Phiilps would take the reins as head coach. Philips joined the Brave having spent time as assistant coach of the team previously and was current Australian women's national team head coach. Preparations for Season 2020 where then interrupted by the outbreak of the COVID-19 pandemic. The league subsequently cancelled both the 2020 and 2021 AIHL seasons due to the state and international border shutdowns in Australia caused by the pandemic. In 2021, the Brave ownership collapsed owing debts to creditors of the Canberra Cavalry. Joint management with the Cavs ceased and ownership transitioned to new CEO, Sunny Singh. In September, the Brave were able to host an exhibition game to celebrate 40 years of ice hockey in the ACT. Current Brave and former Canberra Knights players participated in the event, which also marked the original retirement of then team captain Matt Harvey.

=== 2022-Present ===
The Brave next played hockey in 2022 with the return of a reduced six-team league season. The Brave were successful in 2022, claiming the premiership and championship double, lifting the Goodall Cup for the second time and completing a three-peat of H Newman Reid trophies. The CBR Brave were unsuccessful in their attempt at going back-to-back in lifting the Goodall Cup in 2023. They were beaten in the grand final by the Melbourne Mustangs, being shutout for the first time in Finals. Canberra did secure a fourth consecutive H Newman Reid Trophy in a new expanded 10-team two-conference AIHL league system. This result, also meant the Brave claimed the first ever Rurak Conference Trophy.

== Club identity ==
=== Branding and design ===
CBR Brave short-form logo

The name and branding for the new club, CBR Brave, was carefully crafted by advertising agency Coordinate on the appointment by the members of the consortium in an effort to break away from the Knights history and to start afresh. This was also due in part to previous Knights owner, John Raut, retaining the rights to the old club's name.

In 2024, to celebrate 10 years of Brave hockey, the team underwent a complete re-brand, with new team name, colours, kits and branding. Canberra company Supercurious completed the re-design.

==== Name ====
Instead of the traditional use of Canberra in the naming of the team, the consortium opted to adopt CBR based from the 2013 ACT Government project, designed to promote Canberra through the use of the CBR brand. CBR gave the team a unique identity in a crowded Canberra sports market that already has a host of teams that use "Canberra" at the beginning to form part of their names (Canberra Raiders; Canberra Capitals; Canberra Cavalry; Canberra United). "Brave" was selected as it embodied the values of the team, community and fans. This was a brave group of players and fans who came together in the eleventh hour to donate time, money and resources to ensure ice hockey remained in the Nation's Capital. In 2024, as part of the 10 year anniversary re-brand, the Brave amended its name to remove the abbreviated "CBR Brave" and replace it with the more traditional "Canberra Brave".

CBR Brave long-form Alt logo

==== Colours ====
The Brave embraced the Australian Capital Territory flag colours of yellow, navy blue and white. The colours can be seen in use in the arena, on team merchandise, official social media accounts, the team website and in advertising videos. The Brave home kits are predominantly navy blue with yellow and white accents while the away kits are predominantly white. In 2016, the team changed its shade of navy blue to become darker. In 2017, the Brave switched from its traditional white away kits to a light grey with navy blue accents. In 2020, the Brave revealed new home jerseys with a black and grey (home) and white and black (away) design. These were used in the 2021 exhibition series and 2022-23 AIHL seasons. In 2024, to mark the teams 10 year anniversary, the Brave re-branded and adopted black, white and gold as the team's new colours.

==== Logo ====
The Brave logo is designed as a custom hand drawn typeface that can be utilised in its entirety as "Brave" or simply as a "B" for a standalone icon. Canberra company Coordinate designed the team's original logo and branding set. In 2024, as part of the 10 year anniversary re-brand, Canberra company Supercurious designed a new set of logos using the revised "Canberra Brave" name including long-firm, short-form and sleeve patch.

==== Kit evolution ====
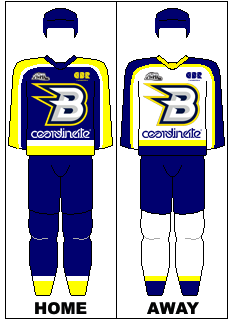
2014 Kits

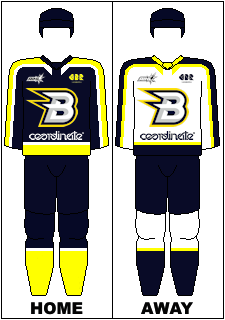
2015 Kits

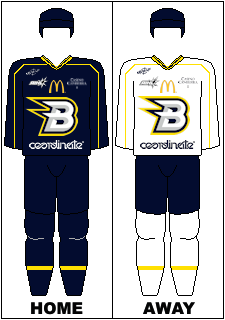
2016 Kits

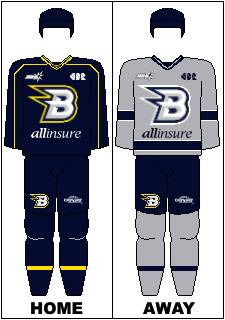
2017 Kits

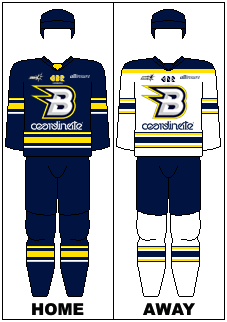
2018 Kits

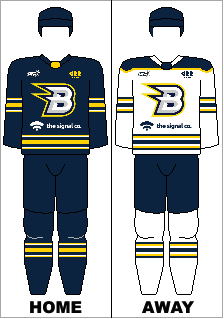
2019 Kits

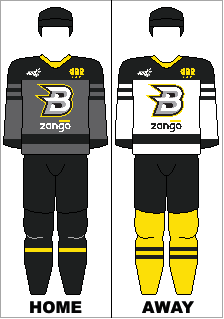
2022 Kits

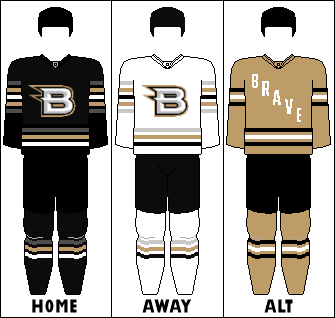
2024 Kits

=== Mascot ===
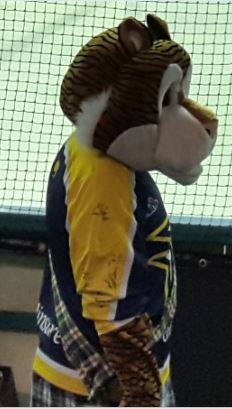
Braveheart Tiger Mascot

The Brave have one current, one previous official and one unofficial mascot. In 2014 there was just one unofficial mascot, the Braveheart Tiger. However, the team introduced a new official mascot in 2015, the Brave Bot, which looks like a Transformer-type mascot that was introduced to the Brave fans for the first time in the opening round of the 2015 AIHL season when the Brave took on the Sydney Bears at the Brave Cave. The Brave Bot led the team out onto the ice to the background track of techno music (SKRILLEX – Bangarang feat. Sirah). At half time there was a mascot dance off performed for the crowd. The Brave Bot mascot was retired in 2019 with the change of team ownership.

In 2026 "Bruce" the highland cow was introduced as the new Brave mascot at a rare Friday game against the Adelaide Adrenaline on 26 June following some social media teasing in the days before. A short backstory was given by the announcer before he dropped the ceremonial puck for his first game. The mascot's name is taken from the suburb of the same name where the AIS Arena is located being the new home of the Brave for the year previous. Bruce greets fans at the arena entry during the pre-game and typically spends the game interacting with fans on the upper concourse and lower VIP section. Upon the announcement of Bruce, the Facebook profile of the BRAVE BOT resurfaced with a post saying "It's sad to learn that you have been replaced and forgotten about".

=== Fans ===
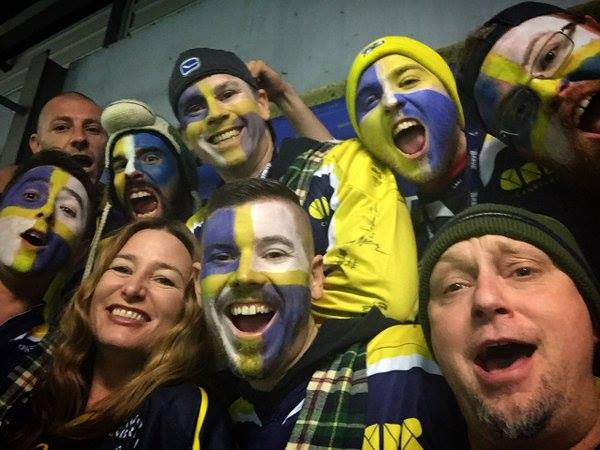
Braveheart fans at the Brave Cave, Canberra

CBR Brave has two unofficial supporters groups, CBR Brave Hecklers and The Bravehearts. The Hecklers were founded 2 July 2011 as the Canberra Knights Hecklers but once the Knights folded the Hecklers switched to the Brave. The group is known for being very vocal at Brave home games with relentless heckling of the visiting team to make their trip to the capital a tough experience. The group use the social media platform Facebook to share experiences and keep in touch between matches. The Bravehearts were formed at the same time as the new team and members paint their faces and wear a tartan sash. Both supporter groups have their specific reserved locations at the ice rink on match days.

On 22 April 2016, Second City Hockey (SCH), the SB Nation Chicago Blackhawks supporters blog, announced they had adopted the CBR Brave as their AIHL team to support in the NHL offseason. SCH will cover the league on their blog and promote the Brave partnership to their membership. This announcement came after fellow SB Nation hockey blogs, Pension Plan Puppets (Toronto Maple Leafs), Stanley Cup of Chowder (Boston Bruins) and Die by the Blade (Buffalo Sabres) held public polls and selected Perth Thunder, Melbourne Mustangs / Newcastle North Stars and Sydney Bears to follow respectively. The Brave were leading the Die by the Blade poll but were withdrawn when selected by Second City Hockey.

=== Club facilities ===
The Brave train and play home matches in the AIHL at the AIS Arena where since 2025 a temporary ice rink is built each winter almost exclusively for Brave games. The arena boasts the largest number of spectators of any ice rink in Australia, around 3,000 including VIP on the lower level, and in 2026 a limited number of standing tickets for the upper concourse are released the week before the game. The build process is said to take 2 weeks, with significant upgrades to boards, player benches, and penalty boxes made between the first and second year of operation. The Brave's time at the arena is based on a 3-year contract with 2 extension options of 1 year each available. The area also hosts the Ice Hockey Classic series with Brave vs USA/Canada fixtures as well as USA vs Canada games raising awareness and funds for the STOPCONCUSSIONS Foundation.

For their 'CBR' years the Brave would train & play at the iconic Phillip Ice Skating Centre that was known as the Brave Cave on match-days. Being the only year-round ice rink currently in Canberra the team typically train at Philip in the pre-season before the temporary AIS ice is made. The ice rink has a spectator capacity of around one thousand with both seating and standing room utilised. The players enter and exit the ice rink in amongst the crowd giving the fans a unique opportunity to get close to their sporting idols. Nets are used around the rink to stop ice pucks with no plexi-glass installed. There is a bar located on a mezzanine level to the near end of the rink closest to the entry and exit doors. In the first season, The Brave sold out all home matches at the Brave Cave with fans lined up outside in the Canberra winter cold for up to an hour for entry.

On 16 August 2014, ACT Sports Minister, Shane Rattenbury, formally rejected a proposal to build a brand new ice rink attached to the new swimming complex planned for the Molonglo Valley in Canberra's south. Mr Rattenbury's reasons for his decision came from a feasibility study into the proposal ruling out the investment into a second ice rink for a city due to the population size of Canberra at this time. Instead the minister proposed further review of what can be done to upgrade the current privately owned Phillip Ice Centre facility. Brave co-director, Warren Apps, responded to the news on the ACT Grandstand radio program on 666 ABC Canberra by further expressing the need for new investment due to the demand on the current facility now exceeding its capacity. With the CBR Brave struggling to secure enough training time on the ice at Phillip due to all the other sporting and recreational commitments on the facility.

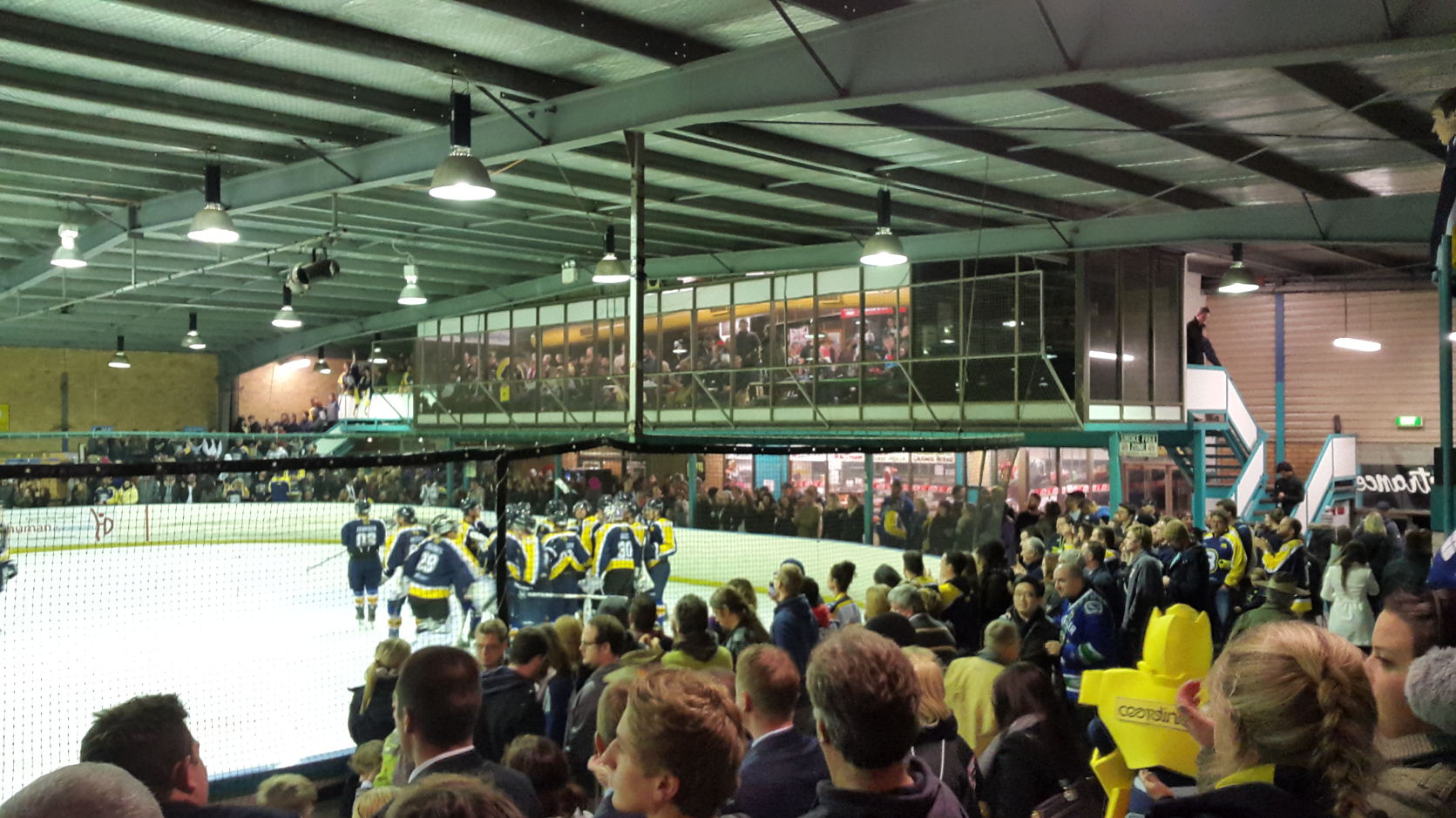
Game Day experience at the Brave Cave, Opening night of the 2015 AIHL season CBR Brave vs Sydney Bears, CBR Brave winning 4-2

On 17 January 2016, the ACT Government released a detailed report into ACT Indoor Sports facilities that again raised the issue of ice sports and the Phillip Ice Skating Centre. The report highlighted the issues of having an old private facility at the end of its lifespan servicing a growing ice sports community and national sports franchise in the national capital. The report suggested a full business case and plan be drawn up at exploring alternative options for building a new multi-purpose facility in the fastest growing areas of Canberra, the Molonglo Valley and Gungahlin, where the lower land values can boost a feasibility case for construction compared to re-building in Phillip. Shane Rattenbury responded to the release of the report by saying a new ice sports facility with duel rinks for competition and practice was in the Government's longer-term plans but stressed the need for community engagement and private sector support. CBR Brave part-owner, Peter Chamberlain, concurred with the recommendations of the report in relation to ice sports.

On 26 August 2016, ACT Labor made the announcement as part of their 2016 election campaign that they would pledge to build a new ice sports centre in the south of Canberra as part of a $23.3m four-year plan to upgrade sporting facilities territory wide if re-elected. This policy announcement was made in response to the ACT Indoor Sports Facilities Report commissioned by the government earlier in the year. Initially $75,000 would be spent in conjunction with the Ice Sports Federation on a community consultation program to determine what the community feels is needed and where exactly the facility should be located. Ice Hockey ACT (IHACT) welcomed the commitment announcement by the ACT Government to building a new ice sports facility with IHACT's president, Allan McLean, commenting "We are very excited at the thought of playing ice hockey in a new, larger facility with the potential to grow our sport,".

On 19 February 2019, the ACT Government commissioned options paper for a new ice facility for Canberra was released by Lockbridge on behalf of the ACT Ice Sports Federation. The paper outlined three options for a new facility in Canberra. The three options looked at in the report included a twin sheet facility planned over two levels, a twin sheet facility planned over one level and a single rink facility planned over two levels. The projected price range between the three options spanned between $22.6 million to $35.4 million. All three options did not meet IHACT seating capacity requirements of 2000 seating and 500 standing as outlined in the IHACT function brief. The two-story options provided 1200 seating and 400 standing capacity with the single story option providing a 600 seating and 200 standing capacity. All three options included space for the establishment of the Australian Ice Sports Hall of Fame.

In response to the release of the options paper, the ACT Government announced it would establish a tender process, in the first quarter of 2019, to seek a private partner for the project. The ACT Sports Minister spokesman reiterated the Chief Minister's promise to start construction by 2020 and advised the ACT Government had put money aside in the budget for the project.

=== Rivalries ===
==== Newcastle Northstars ====
Over the Brave's first three seasons in the AIHL the club has built a healthy rivalry with the Newcastle Northstars. This rivalry intensified at the end of the 2015 AIHL season when the Northstars came from behind to beat the CBR Brave in the Goodall Cup semi-finals. The Brave scored two shorthanded goals on the way to securing a 3–0 lead deep into the second period of the match before League MVP and AIHL record breaker, Geordie Wudrick, came to life and scored a third period hat trick that set up the Northstars comeback win as they scored a fourth and final goal to win the match 4–3. The Brave were devastated at missing out on the chance to contest the Goodall Cup final for the second year straight and just before the start of the 2016 AIHL season the club announced the signing of the very player that knocked them out the year before, naming Geordie Wudrick as one of the Brave's six import signings for 2016.

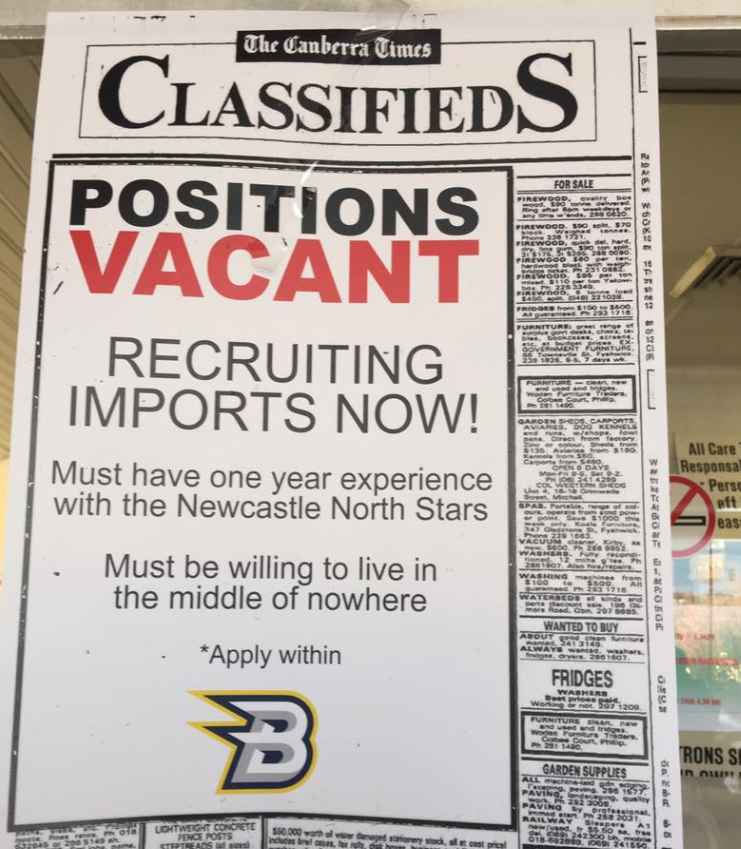
Fan made poster

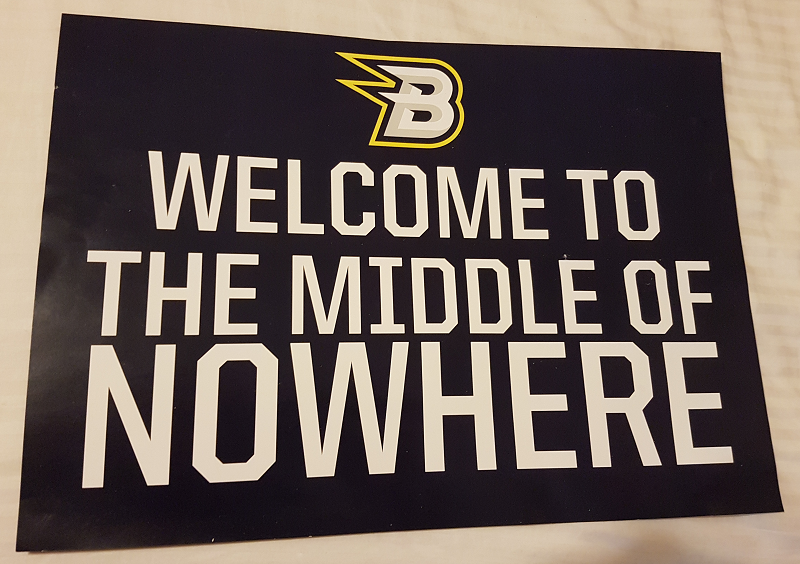
Middle of nowhere placard given out pre-game on 28 May 2016 for the CBR Brave vs Newcastle North Stars AIHL match

It is very rare in the AIHL to see players switch teams so the move of Wudrick from Newcastle to Canberra made headlines. Newcastle Northstars head coach, Andrew Petrie, slammed the move by the Brave board to 'poach' Wudrick weeks out from the new season, insisting the Northstars and Wudrick had a verbal agreement that he would return to the Hunter Valley. In the interview he labelled Canberra a city "in the middle of nowhere" and made reference to CBR standing for "Can Buy Resources but Can’t Buy Respect" which drew the ire of the CBR Brave fans and the club itself.

Newcastle's head coach, Andrew Petrie, repeated his negative views of the CBR Brave club and management in a second interview with the Newcastle Herald newspaper which prompted a fan reaction from the CBR Brave supporters. On the away trip to Newcastle on 22 May 2016 the travelling CBR Brave fans organised and distributed a special limited edition 'from the middle of nowhere' T-shirt for the supporters to wear to the match. The return match in Canberra on 28 May 2016 saw the club hand out placards to the fans welcoming the North Stars to the middle of nowhere while Brave DJ organised a special one-off walk out song for the Northstars to the tune of 'In the Middle of Nowhere' by Dusty Springfield.

On 26 May 2016, The CBR Brave, after suffering a large number of injuries to the playing roster, announced the signing of a second former Newcastle Northstar's import, Jan Safar. This prompted more banter between the two clubs and fans on social media including the creation of a fan made poster that was put up at the Brave Cave when Newcastle visited Canberra that depicted a fake classifieds advert for import players to apply for the CBR Brave with the condition that they must have previously played for the Newcastle Northstars.

The four regular season matches between the two clubs in 2016 were brutal with a large number of player injuries, including the career ending throat injury to import defenceman Art Bidlevskii and 178 penalty minutes racked up in the box. While the Brave once again suffered heartache to the hands of the North Stars in the 2016 AIHL Finals as the North Stars beat the Brave 2–1 in the Goodall Cup Final.

==== Melbourne Ice ====
2016 saw a firm rivalry between the CBR Brave and Melbourne Ice emerge from an infamous incident involving Lliam Webster and Geordie Wudrick. Webster body slammed Wudrick from behind, knocking him out cold and hospitalising the Brave player. Wudrick missed a large amount of the 2016 AIHL season as a result. The inaction by the match referees incensed the CBR Brave team and fans and this carried through to the return double header weekend in Canberra in August. Brave DJ set the tone for the encounters with a rendition of The Imperial March (Darth Vader's Theme) from Star Wars when the Melbourne Ice players walked out onto the ice. A total of 252 penalty minutes were handed out during the two matches which also saw 6 players ejected, 5 players suspended, 4 separate fights and an all-out on ice melee between all the players. In amongst all the carnage there was nineteen goals scored in the first game and a further seven scored in the second game with two hard fought one goal victories being split between the two teams. The Ice secured a 10–9 victory in the first match after leading 7–2 before a third period rally by the Brave saw them score six unanswered goals to temporarily take the lead 8–7 before succumbing to the visitors late on. While the Brave won the second match 4–3 to inflict only the second regulation time loss of the 2016 season on the Melbourne Ice.

The two teams met again in the semi-finals of the AIHL Finals weekend as 1st (Ice) versus 4th (Brave). The CBR Brave caused a major upset winning the match 4–3 in overtime thanks to a breakaway strike by defenceman Jan Safar but only after a bizarre and at the time controversial goal was scored by Lasse Lassen with a minute twenty five seconds left in the match to tie the game up at 3-3 and send the game to overtime. Lassen took a shot that was hard to judge if it crossed the line or not. Play continued for forty seconds before the officials conferred and decided the puck had crossed the line and awarded the goal.

beyondblue Cup record
Team	Total wins
Brave	5
Adrenaline	0

==== Adelaide Adrenaline ====
The CBR Brave developed a friendly rivalry with the Adelaide Adrenaline in the 2015 AIHL season with two fiery matches played with plenty of penalties and player ejections. So in accordance with this newly established rivalry the CBR Brave in conjunction the Adrenaline announced the founding of an annual cup named the Beyond Blue Cup that is contested between the two clubs once a season. The cup is named after the Australian beyondblue non-profit organisation that raises awareness and supports people with depression and anxiety. The Cup is used to help spread the core message of beyondblue: "raising awareness and understanding, empowering people to seek help, and supporting recovery, management and resilience against depression".

24 May 2015, The Brave lifted the inaugural Beyond Blue Cup with a comprehensive 8–2 victory over Adelaide Adrenaline off the back of a hat-trick to Canadian import Kelly Geoffrey.

=== The Brave Foundation ===
On 23 August 2015, The CBR Brave established their very own and new charitable foundation named 'The Brave Foundation'. The purpose of the foundation is to raise awareness and assist people in need who are struggling with mental health issues, particularly PTSD and depression in young men. The Foundation was born out of terrible circumstance when the brother-in-law, Robbie, of former Brave captain Mark Rummukainen sadly took his own life after suffering from depression. Robbie was well known to the Brave management and players with the loss felt by the whole Brave community. Since inception, the foundation has raised money through a number of events including dinners with players and auctioning off match-worn hockey gear. The Brave Foundation spends the money raised on tangible achievements as opposed to handing money over to a charity and not knowing where it ends up. For example, putting people through a program called 'Accidental Councillor' or funding of additional telephones for Lifeline. The Foundation has formed strong connections with a number of reputable charities and services such as Lifeline, beyondblue and Soldier On.

=== Ownership ===
In 2014, the ACT community banded together to raise funds to keep AIHL hockey in Canberra following the demise of the Knights. Led by former Knights players, Mark Rummukainen and Jordie Gavin, the community raised over $23,000. With the money raised, an ownership consortium was established to work on the business case to secure an AIHL licence. Local businessmen, Peter Chamberlain (Allinsure), Jamie Wilson and Warren Apps (Coordinate) joined Mark Rummukainen to form the ownership consortium.

In 2019, it was announced the CBR Brave ownership consortium had reached a deal with the ownership consortium of the Canberra Cavalry to merge the two franchises into one. Chamberlain, Wilson and Apps would continue to run the team through the 2019 season with a staggered merger period set-up that saw the new team management come into effect in 2020.

In 2020, it was revealed Daniel Amodio and his business partner, Donn McMichael, had become majority shareholders and new directors of the CBR Brave. The new team management was also announced with Daniel Amodio taking up the role of CEO, Donn McMichael becoming chairman of the advisory committee, Sunny Singh become business Operations General Manager and Jordie Gavin stepping into General Manager of hockey operations.

In April 2021, the CBR Brave ownership team of Daniel Amodio and Donn McMichael collapsed following $400,000 in debts owing to creditors with the Canberra Cavalry. Along with the ownership, the joint-management arrangements between the Brave and Cavalry also ceased. In its place, a new management structure was established under new CEO, Sunny Singh. Peter Chamberlain, Jamie Wilson and Warren Apps returned to assist in an advisory capacity through the transition period.

In 2022, the ownership of the CBR Brave had been transferred from Sunny Singh to Cruachan Investments (Stephen Campbell). In May 2022 Steve Moeller was appointed as General Manager and later in 2022 became Chief Operating Officer of the franchise.

== Players ==
=== Current roster ===
Team roster for the 2026 AIHL season

Canberra Brave roster - 2026 AIHL season
Active roster		Inactive roster	Coaching staff
Goaltenders: 29 (Australia) Alexandre Tétreault; 30 (United States) Victor Sjodin; 35 (New Zealand) Joel Hasselman; Defencemen: 4 (Australia) Lachlan Fahmy; 5 (Canada) Spencer Cox (I); 7 (Australia) Bayley Kubara (A); 8 (Canada) Cameron Marks (I); 21 (Canada) Matt Buskas; 26 (Canada) Bray Crowder; 43 (Australia) Bodhi Matthew; 90 (United States) Matt Marasco; 93 (Australia) Ethan Elford	Forwards: 3 (Australia) Mitchell Henning (A); 6 (Australia) Noah Harvey; 10 (Australia) Scott Clemie; 11 (United States) Peter Bates (I); 12 (Australia) Thomas Harrow; 14 (Australia) Charlie York; 15 (Australia) Casey Kubara; 17 (Australia) Thomas Steven; 19 (New Zealand) Jake Ratcliffe; 22 (Canada) Carson Miller (I); 24 (New Zealand) Jacob Carey; 38 (Croatia) Dominic Čanić (I); 42 (Australia) Jackson Gallagher; 47 (Canada) Justin Maylan (I); 64 (Australia) Kai Miettinen (C); 71 (Australia) Jordon Brunt; 91 (Australia) Henry York; 94 (Australia) Cameron Todd	9 (Canada) Brayden Low (I) (REL); 44 (Australia) Nick Christensen (A); 96 (Australia) Ricki Miettinen	Head Coach: (Australia) Stuart Philps; Coaches: (Australia) Timothy Cox (AC); (Australia) Darryl Day (EM); Sam Elliott (EM); Shane Lenson (DO); Jonathan Carey (PT); Callam Smyth (PT); Brent Russ (ST); Legend (C) Captain (A) Alternate Captain (I) Import player Statistics; Average age: 27.53; Average height: 184.18 cm Average weight: 84.46 kg Locals: 24; Imports: 6
Last updated on: 18 July 2026

=== Trophy winning rosters ===
2018 Championship roster

The CBR Brave team of 2018 secured the double by claiming the H Newman Reid Trophy and Goodall Cup. CBR set then league records for most points (72 points) and most wins (24 wins) in a regular AIHL season. The Brave won the finals weekend in Melbourne, defeating the Melbourne Mustangs 5–1 in semi final 1 before defeating the Sydney Bears 4–3 in overtime in the Goodall Cup final. Trevor Gerling was named finals MVP and finished the regular season equal top point scorer (67 points) with Thunder player Pier-Olivier Grandmaison. The Cup victory provided Joey Hughes with his sixth Goodall Cup success, breaking the league record for a single player. It was the first time a Canberra franchise had won the AIHL championship and secured the Goodall Cup. While it was only the second time a team from the ACT had claimed the Goodall Cup. An ACT representative team, which also included Dave Lewis and Mark Rummukainen, won the cup in 1998 in the old inter-state tournament format.

2018 Championship Roster
Goaltenders
(Australia) #29 Tynan Theobald	(Australia) #31 Jakob Doornbos	(Australia) #35 Alexandre Tetreault	(Canada) #92 Mat Hewitt
Defenceman
(Canada) #4 Channing Bresciani	(Australia) #7 Bayley Kubara	(Australia) #12 Mark Rummukainen	(Australia) #17 James Byers
(Australia) #25 Matt Buskas	(Australia) #26 Darcy Flanagan	(Australia) #59 Per Daniel Göransson	(New Zealand) #81 Matthew Harvey (C)
Forwards
(Australia) #3 Mitchell Henning	(Australia) #6 Christopher McPhail	(Australia) #9 Wehebe Darge (A)	(Australia) #11 David Lewis
(Australia) #14 Jayden Lewis	(Australia) #15 Casey Kubara	(Australia) #16 Tyler Kubara	(Australia) #19 Jordan Gavin (A)
(Australia) #20 Hayden Dawes	(Australia) #24 Joseph Hughes	(Canada) #48 Chris Leveille	(Australia) #64 Kai Miettinen (A)
(Latvia) #66 Ainars Podzins	(Australia) #71 Jordan Brunt	(United States) #78 Trevor Gerling
Coaching staff
(Australia) Robert Starke (Head coach)		(Australia) Mike Sargeant (Assistant)	(Canada) Gordon Cocknell (Assistant)

2019 Premiership roster

The 2019 Brave team broke AIHL regular season records for most wins (26), most points (79), largest winning streak (17 matches), most goals scored (161), fewest goals conceded in a 28 match season (67) and least losses in a 28 match season (2). The Brave won the H Newman Reid Trophy for the second season in a row by finishing as league premiers, 25 points ahead of second placed Newcastle Northstars.

2019 Premiership Roster
Goaltenders
(Australia) #29 Alexandre Tetreault	(Australia) #31 Jakob Doornbos	(Canada) #33 Matt Climie	(Australia) #38 Nick Eckhardt
Defenceman
(Australia) #7 Bayley Kubara	(Canada) #10 Tyler Mayea	(Australia) #12 Mark Rummukainen	(Australia) #20 Hayden Dawes
(Australia) #22 Nicholas Doornbos	(Canada) #22 Mike Giorgi	(Australia) #25 Spencer Austin	(Australia) #41 Matthew Price
(United States) #44 Conor Riley	(Australia) #80 Jackson Gallagher	(New Zealand) #81 Matthew Harvey (C)	(Australia) #91 Nick Christensen
Forwards
(Australia) #3 Mitchell Henning	(Australia) #9 Wehebe Darge (A)	(Australia) #11 David Lewis	(Australia) #14 Jayden Lewis
(Australia) #15 Casey Kubara	(Australia) #16 Tyler Kubara	(Australia) #21 Joseph Hughes	(Canada) #23 Adam Kambeitz
(Australia) #27 Andreas Camenzind	(Canada) #28 Jordan Draper	(Australia) #42 Lachlan Seary	(Australia) #51 Hamish Murray
(Switzerland) #61 Chris Williamson	(Australia) #61 Joseph Maatouk	(Canada) #63 Jesse Gabrielle	(Australia) #64 Kai Miettinen (A)
(Australia) #71 Jordan Brunt	(Canada) #91 Brayden Low
Coaching staff
(Australia) Robert Starke (Head coach)		(Australia) Max Ross (Assistant)

2022 Championship roster

The 2022 Brave team won the premiership/championship double for the second time in the team's history. The AIHL in 2022 was a reduced season with six teams rather than eight. The Brave broke two team records in 2022, largest regular season win and largest finals win.

2022 Championship Roster
Goaltenders
(Australia) #-- Luke Fiveash	(Australia) #29 Alexandre Tetreault	(Australia) #35 Aleksi Toivonen
Defenceman
(United States) #5 Garret Cockerill	(Australia) #6 Nicholas Doornbos	(Australia) #7 Bayley Kubara (A)	(Australia) #18 Jamie Woodman
(United States) #20 Matthew Marasco	(Australia) #22 Mike Giorgi	(Switzerland) #27 Andreas Camenzind	(Australia) #41 Matthew Price
(Australia) #58 Declan Bronte	(Australia) #61 Joseph Maatouk	(Australia) #72 Alastair Punler
Forwards
(Australia) #3 Mitchell Henning	(Australia) #9 Wehebe Darge	(Australia) #11 Lyndon Lodge	(Australia) #14 Charlie York
(Australia) #15 Casey Kubara (A)	(Australia) #16 Tyler Kubara	(Canada) #19 Mario Valery-Trabucco	(Australia) #21 Joseph Hughes
(Australia) #42 Jackson Gallagher	(Australia) #44 Nick Christensen	(Australia) #64 Kai Miettinen (C)	(Australia) #71 Jordan Brunt
(Australia) #85 Toby Kubara
Coaching staff
(Australia) Stuart Philps (Head coach)		(Australia) Andrew Brunt (Assistant)

=== Franchise all-time player records ===
These are the top-ten all-time players in franchise history in the following categories: Appearances, Goals, Assists, Points, Penalty minutes
(Figures are updated after each completed AIHL regular season)

All-time Appearances
No.	Name	Pos	GP
1	(Australia) Kai Miettinen	F	203
2	(Australia) Tyler Kubara	F	151
3	(New Zealand) Matthew Harvey	D	145
4	(Australia) Mitchell Henning	F	138
11	(Australia) Dylan Wilson	F	130
6	(Australia) Jimmy Byers	D	126
7	(Australia) Mark Rummukainen	D	110
8	(Australia) Bayley Kubara	D	104
9	(Australia) Jordan Brunt	F	99
10	(Australia) Wehebe Darge	F	89

All-time Goals
No.	Name	Pos	G
1	(Canada) Stephen Blunden	F	108
2	(Australia) Casey Kubara	F	83
3	(Australia) Wehebe Darge	F	70
4	(Australia) Kai Miettinen	F	46
5	(Australia) Tyler Kubara	F	44
6	(New Zealand) Matthew Harvey	D	44
7	(Australia) Joseph Hughes	F	41
8	(Canada) Geordie Wudrick	F	40
9	(Canada) Jesse Gabrielle	F	39
10	(United States) Austin Albrecht	F	39

All-time Assists
No.	Name	Pos	A
1	(Australia) Casey Kubara	F	140
2	(Canada) Stephen Blunden	F	122
3	(Australia) Wehebe Darge	F	117
4	(New Zealand) Matthew Harvey	D	86
5	(Australia) Tyler Kubara	F	74
6	(Canada) Geordie Wudrick	F	64
7	(Australia) Kai Miettinen	F	60
8	(Czech Republic) Jan Safar	D	59
9	(Australia) Joseph Hughes	F	53
10	(Australia) Andy Camenzind	F	47

All-time Points
No.	Name	Pos	PTS
1	(Canada) Stephen Blunden	F	230
2	(Australia) Casey Kubara	F	223
3	(Australia) Wehebe Darge	F	187
4	(New Zealand) Matthew Harvey	D	130
5	(Australia) Tyler Kubara	F	118
6	(Australia) Kai Miettinen	F	106
7	(Canada) Geordie Wudrick	F	104
8	(Australia) Joseph Hughes	F	94
9	(Australia) Andy Camenzind	F	77
10	(United States) Austin Albrecht	D	76

All-time Penalty Minutes
No.	Name	Pos	PIM
1	(Australia) Harry Byers	F	321
2	(Canada) Stephen Blunden	F	220
3	(Australia) Kai Miettinen	F	212
4	(Australia) Ryan Johnson	F	195
5	(New Zealand) Matthew Harvey	D	181
6	(Australia) Joseph Hughes	F	150
7	(Australia) Bayley Kubara	D	137
8	(Czech Republic) Jan Safar	D	124
9	(Australia) Mark Rummukainen	D	122
10	(Australia) David Dunwoodie	F	120

As of September 2023

== Staff ==
Current as of 2024 AIHL season.

CBR Brave Staff
Role	Staff
Head coach	(Australia) Stuart Philps
Assistant Coach	(Australia) Timothy Cox
Assistant Coach	(Australia) Jordan Gavin
Goaltending Coach	(Canada) Peter Di Salvo
Team Manager	(Australia) Darryl Day
Equipment Manager	(Australia) Tom Letki
Equipment Manager	(Australia) Andrew Deans
Team Doctor	(Australia) Rob Reid
Physiotherapist	(Australia) Jono Carey
Trainer	(Australia) Brent Russ
General Manager	(Australia) Jordan Gavin
Competition Advisor	(Australia) Steve Moeller
Chief Executive Officer	(Australia) Stephen Campbell
Team Governor	(Australia) Darren Sault
Chief Operating Officer	(Australia) Kelly Sault

== Leaders ==
=== Team captains ===
The Brave have had a total of four captains in five terms in the team's history. Former Canberra Knights and Brisbane Blue Tongues player, Mark Rummukainen, was the team's first captain.

No.	Name	Term
1	(Australia) Mark Rummukainen	2014–16
2	(Australia) Jordan Gavin	2016–17
3	(Australia) Mark Rummukainen	2017–18
4	(Canada) Matthew Harvey	2018–21
5	(Australia) Kai Miettinen	2022–Present

=== Head coaches ===
The Brave have had a total of six head coaches, with five permanent appointments and two interim, in the team's history. Canberra's first head coach was Matti Luoma.

No.	Name	Term	Record (Note: Figures include both regular and post-season statistics.)
.			P	W	T	L	GF	GA	+/-	Win %
1	(Australia) Matti Luoma	2014	29	16	1	12	107	95	+12	55.2%
2	(Australia) Brad Hunt	2015	21	10	0	11	80	82	-2	47.6%
3	(United States) Josh Unice (interim) (Note: Unice took over from Hunt, who resigned, and finished the 2015 season before being appointed full time in March 2016.)	2015	8	6	0	2	47	26	+21	75.0%
3	(United States) Josh Unice	2016	27	17	0	10	125	111	+14	63.0%
4	(Canada) Art Bidlevskii (interim) (Note: Following Unice stepping down, Art took over for the final game of the 2016 regular season and the 2016 finals series.)	2016	3	1	0	2	9	11	-2	33.3%
5	(Australia) Robert Starke	2017–20	89	69	0	20	463	258	+205	77.5%
6	(Australia) Stuart Philps	2020–Present	81	58	0	20	464	246	+218	71.6%

== Honours ==
=== Championships ===
- Goodall Cup

(gold) Champions (3): 2018, 2022, 2024
(silver) Runners-Up (4): 2016, 2017, 2023, 2025, 2026

- H Newman Reid Trophy

(gold) Premiers (4): 2018, 2019, 2022, 2023

- Rurak Conference Trophy

(gold) Winners (1): 2023
(silver) Runners-Up (1): 2024

=== Franchise Awards ===
Each season CBR Brave holds an annual awards night where the team awards a number of players and members of the Brave hockey community.

Season	MVP	BF	BD	FC	PC	CA	EB	JLMA	DA
2014	Petri Pitkänen	Stephen Blunden	Matt Harvey	Anton Kokkonen	Aaron Clayworth	Aaron Clayworth	Kai Miettinen	Mark Rummukainen	-
2015	Stephen Blunden	Stephen Blunden	Kyle Marini	Jimmy Byers	Mark Rummukainen	Kai Miettinen; Peter Taylor	Jimmy Byers	Ryan Johnson	-
2016	Jan Safar; Mathieu Guertin	Mathieu Guertin	Jan Safar	Jimmy Byers	Kai Miettinen	Not Awarded	Casey Kubara	Andrew Deans; Judy Deans	-
2017	Stephen Blunden	Stephen Blunden	Dominic Jalbert	Jan Safar	Dominic Jalbert	Matt Harvey	Bayley Kubara	Krisy Maricic; Bede Riley	-
2018	Trevor Gerling; Matt Hewitt	Chris Leveille	Channing Bresciani	Matt Hewitt	Wehebe Darge	Kai Miettinen	Mitch Henning	Darryl Day	Tristan Metcalfe
2019	Matt Climie	Wehebe Darge	Matt Harvey	Jesse Gabrielle	Adam Kambeitz	Bayley Kubara	Nick Christensen	Murray Barton; Mandi Webb	Robyn Kemp; David Kemp
2022	Mario Valery-Trabucco	Casey Kubara	Garret Cockerill	Mike Giorgi	Mario Valery-Trabucco	Bayley Kubara	Declan Bronte	Jordie Gavin	Scott Stevenson
2024	Jake Ratcliffe	Austin Cangelosi	Bayley Kubara	Jacob Carey	Justin Maylan; Austin Cangelosi	Jacob Carey	Bodhi Matthew	Tom Letki	Annie Abbott
2025	Dominic Čanić	Nils Carnbäck	Bray Crowder	Matt Clark	Jacob Carey; Cameron Todd	Joel Hasselman	Thomas Harrow	Payton Gregor	Joel Hasselman; Trevor Hennock
2026	Peter Bates	Jake Ratcliffe	Bray Crowder	Joel Hasselman	Justin Maylan	Victor Sjodin	Ethan Elford	Colin Beckinsale	Michael & Nat Pinney

=== CBR Sports Awards ===
Established in December 2016 by the ACT Government to celebrate the city's proud sporting culture by recognising excellence at an individual and team level, innovation and inclusive practices within Canberra's sporting community.
The Brave first made the finalists list for the innovation award in 2017 before winning their first award in 2018 by being named the team of the year. The Brave were nominated for Team of the Year again in 2022, and won for a second time.

- Team of the year

Winners (3): 2018, 2022, 2024

- ACT Government Award – Award for Event Excellence

Winners (1): 2025

- Ministers Award – Innovation

Winners (0):
Finalists (1): 2017

== Team records ==
=== Firsts ===
First AIHL match: 12 April 2014 (0–2 loss to the Northstars in Canberra)
First AIHL win: 26 April 2014 (6–2 win over the Ice Dogs in Canberra)
First AIHL loss: 12 April 2014 (0–2 loss to the Northstars in Canberra)
First AIHL finals appearance: 30 August 2014 (1–6 loss to the Ice in Melbourne)
First Goodall Cup final appearance: 28 August 2016 (1–2 loss to the Northstars in Melbourne)

=== Single matches ===
Record goal scoring match: 19 goals (two times: 9–10 against the Ice on 6 August 2016 and 11–8 against the Ice Dogs on 11 August 2018)
Record AIHL regular season win: 14-1 (against the Ice Dogs on 8 May 2022)
Record AIHL regular season loss: 2-11 (against the Thunder on 2 August 2025)
Record AIHL finals win: 6-1 (against the Northstars on 2 September 2022)
Record AIHL finals loss: 1-6 (against the Ice on 30 August 2014)

=== Wins/losses ===
Most wins in a regular season: 26 wins (2019 season)
Fewest wins in a regular season: 16 wins (2014, 2015 and 2017 seasons)
Most losses in a regular season: 14 losses (2024 season)
Fewest losses in a regular season: 2 losses (2019 season)
Record winning streak: 17 games (between 11 May and 21 July 2019)
Record losing streak: 9 games (between 13 April and 12 May 2024)

=== Goals ===
Most goals scored in a regular season: 161 (2019 season)
Fewest goals scored in a regular season: 106 (2014 season)
Most goals conceded in a regular season: 130 (2025 season)
Fewest goals conceded in a regular season: 67 (2019 season)

=== Points ===
Most points in a regular season: 79 (2019 season)
Fewest points in a regular season: 46 (2017 season)

== Season-by-season results ==
CBR Brave Season-by-Season Record
Season	Regular season											Finals									Top points scorer
Season	P	W	T	L	OW	OL	GF	GA	GD	Pts	Finish	P	W	L	GF	GA	Result	Preliminary Final	Semi Final	Goodall Cup Final	Name	Points
2014	28	14	1*	9	2	2	106	89	+17	49	3rd	1	–	1	1	6	Semi-finalist	–	Lost 1-6 (Ice)	–	(Canada) Stephen Blunden	68
2015	28	13	–	10	3	2	125	104	+21	47	4th	1	–	1	3	4	Semi-finalist	–	Lost 3-4 (North Stars)	–	(Canada) Stephen Blunden	79
2016	28	15	–	9	2	2	129	117	+12	51	4th	2	1	1	5	5	Runner-up	–	Won 4-3 (Ice)	Lost 1-2 (North Stars)	(Canada) Geordie Wudrick	50
2017	28	13	–	11	3	1	130	101	+29	46	3rd	2	1	1	7	6	Runner-up	–	Won 6-2 (Thunder)	Lost 1-4 (Ice)	(Canada) Geordie Wudrick	54
2018	28	24	–	4	–	–	152	74	+78	72	1st	2	2	–	9	4	Champion	–	Won 5-1 (Mustangs)	Won 4-3 (OT) (Bears)	(United States) Trevor Gerling	67
2019	28	26	–	1	–	1	161	67	+94	79	1st	1	–	1	4	6	Semi-finalist	–	Lost 4-6 (Bears)	–	(Canada) Jesse Gaberille	67
2020	2020 and 2021 AIHL seasons were cancelled and not contested
2021	2020 and 2021 AIHL seasons were cancelled and not contested
2022	18	15	–	2	–	1	141	56	+85	49	1st	2	2	–	9	3	Champion	–	Won 6-1 (Northstars)	Won 3-2 (Northstars)	(Australia) Casey Kubara	52
2023	26	20	–	4	1	1	170	77	+93	63	1st	2	1	1	4	2	Runner-up	–	Won 4-1 (Thunder)	Lost 0-1 (Mustangs)	(United States) Austin Albrecht	76
2024	30	15	–	11	1	3	128	105	+23	50	5th	3	3	–	12	3	Champion	Won 2-1 (Thunder)	Won 5-2 (Bears)	Won 5-0 (Ice)	(United States) Austin Cangelosi	53
2025	28	15	–	10	3	0	149	130	+19	51	2nd	2	1	1	9	8	Runner-up	–	Won 6-1 (Thunder)	Lost 3-7 (Ice)	(New Zealand) Dominic Čanić	42
2026	30	18	–	7	2	3	152	109	+43	61	3rd	3	2	1	10	9	Runner-up	Won 4-3 (Bears)	Won 5-4 (Mustangs)	Loss 1-2 (Northstars)	(New Zealand) Jake Ratcliffe	65
Totals	270	170	1	71	15	13	1391	920	+471			18	11	7	63	47

(*) – Despite there being no ties in the AIHL, since the introduction of the shootout in 2006, the Brave and Adrenaline were awarded one point each after their match, on 19 July 2014, was cancelled by the AIHL due to a bus crash involving the travelling Adelaide players and coaching staff en route to Canberra.

Key:

Champions	Runners-up	Third place

== Broadcasting ==
Current:

- AIHL.TV (2023–present) – Worldwide paid subscription-based online video broadcasting published by the AIHL in partnership with the Clutch.TV platform using local production companies at each team's rink. The service went live in April 2023, and would cover every AIHL regular season and finals games live and on demand.
- Sportradar (2022 - present) – International online video broadcasting in North America and Europe as part of a league-wide 3-year deal signed in March 2022 in the lead up to the 2022 AIHL season.

Former:

- Kayo Sports (2022) – Domestic online video broadcasting in Australia as part of the league wide deal struck in the lead up to the 2022 AIHL season to show every AIHL game live.
- Wonqy. & The Signal Co. Wireless (2020 - 2021) - Wonqy. became the team's second online video broadcasting partner on 12 March 2020. Intended to start in season 2020, Wonqy. would deliver livestreaming of every Brave home match at Phillip Ice Skating Centre for the first time since 2016. However, due to the COVID-19 pandemic season 2020 and 2021 were cancelled and Wonqy never delivered live streaming of any AIHL games involving the Brave.
- Self-broadcast (2017 - 2019) - Between 2017 and 2019 the CBR Brave self-broadcast online audio streams of all home matches utilising the Mixlr platform.
- Fox Sports (2014 - 2019) - CBR Brave was part of the entire domestic AIHL TV broadcasting deal with Fox Sports to show one game a round on Thursday afternoons.
- Ascension Sports and Host Works (2014 - 2016) - CBR Brave's original online video broadcasting partner was Ascension Sports and Host Works, signed on 11 April 2014 to broadcast every Brave home match live online through the Ascension Sports website, the agreement came to an end in 2017 when league broadcasting rules were changed.
