= 2019 CBR Brave season =

2019 CBR Brave
- League: 1st AIHL
- 2019 record: 26–0–1–1
- Home record: 13–0–0–1
- Road record: 13–0–1–0
- Goals for: 161
- Goals against: 67

Team information
- Coach: (Australia) Robert Starke
- Assistant coach: (Australia) Max Ross
- Captain: (New Zealand) Matthew Harvey
- Alternate captains: (Australia) Wehebe Darge (Australia) Kai Miettinen
- Arena: Phillip Ice Skating Centre

Team leaders
- Goals: (Canada) Jesse Gabrielle (39)
- Assists: (Australia) Wehebe Darge (34)
- Points: (Canada) Jesse Gabrielle (67)
- Penalty minutes: (Australia) Hayden Dawes (69)
- Goals against average: (Canada) Matt Climie (2.15)

The 2019 CBR Brave season was the Brave's 6th season in the Australian Ice Hockey League since being founded and entering the league in 2014. The season ran from 20 April 2019 to 31 August 2019 for the Brave. CBR finished first in the regular season to clinch the H Newman Reid Trophy for the second time in franchise history. However, the Brave lost their semi-final match to the Sydney Bears during the Goodall Cup Finals series in Newcastle. The team set a number of new league records including: most wins (26), most points (79), largest winning streak (17 matches), most goals scored (161), fewest goals conceded in a 28 match season (67) and least losses in a 28 match season (2).

== Roster ==
Team roster for the 2019 AIHL season

2019 AIHL CBR Brave Roster (Note: Omitted from the roster list is Matt Buskas, Nick Eckhardt and Mark Rummukainen, who were all selected in the original 2019 roster but were never dressed for a match.)
#	Nat	Name	Pos	S/G	Age	Acquired	Birthplace
25	(Australia)	Spencer Austin	D	L	34	2019	Hamilton, Ontario, Canada
71	(Australia)	Jordan Brunt	F	L	26	2015	Canberra, Australian Capital Territory, Australia
27	(Australia)	Andreas Camenzind	C	L	44	2019	Wettingen, Aargau, Switzerland
91	(Australia)	Nick Christensen	F			2019	Toronto, Ontario, Canada
33	(Canada)	Matt Climie	G	L	43	2019	Leduc, Alberta, Canada
9	(Australia)	Wehebe Darge (A)	LW/RW	L	34	2017	Adelaide, South Australia, Australia
20	(Australia)	Hayden Dawes	RW	R	32	2018	Stony Plain, Alberta, Canada
31	(Australia)	Jakob Doornbos	G	L	24	2018	Canberra, Australian Capital Territory, Australia
22	(Australia)	Nicholas Doornbos	D	R	22	2019	Canberra, Australian Capital Territory, Australia
28	(Canada)	Jordan Draper	LW/RW	R	36	2019	Sherwood Park, Alberta, Canada
63	(Canada)	Jesse Gabrielle	LW	L	28	2019	Moosomin, Saskatchewan, Canada
80	(Australia)	Jackson Gallagher	D		24	2019	Canberra, Australian Capital Territory, Australia
22	(Canada)	Mike Giorgi	D	L	38	2019	Toronto, Ontario, Canada
81	(New Zealand)	Matthew Harvey (C)	D	R	40	2014	Calgary, Alberta, Canada
3	(Australia)	Mitchell Henning	F	R	28	2016	Brisbane, Queensland, Australia
21	(Australia)	Joseph Hughes	RW	R	41	2018	Springvale, Victoria, Australia
23	(Canada)	Adam Kambeitz	C/LW	L	33	2019	Coaldale, Alberta, Canada
7	(Australia)	Bayley Kubara	D	R	27	2017	Wombarra, New South Wales, Australia
15	(Australia)	Casey Kubara	RW	R	29	2016	Wombarra, New South Wales, Australia
16	(Australia)	Tyler Kubara	F	R	31	2015	Wombarra, New South Wales, Australia
11	(Australia)	David Lewis	F	L	47	2018	Canberra, Australian Capital Territory, Australia
14	(Australia)	Jayden Lewis	F	R	27	2018	Canberra, Australian Capital Territory, Australia
91	(Canada)	Brayden Low	C	L	31	2019	Richmond, British Columbia, Canada
61	(Australia)	Joseph Maatouk	F/D		26	2019	Canberra, Australian Capital Territory, Australia
10	(Canada)	Tyler Mayea	D	L	32	2019	Burlington, Ontario, Canada
64	(Australia)	Kai Miettinen (A)	F	L	30	2014	Canberra, Australian Capital Territory, Australia
51	(Australia)	Hamish Murray	F	R	23	2019	Canberra, Australian Capital Territory, Australia
41	(Australia)	Matthew Price	D	R	37	2019	Newcastle, New South Wales, Australia
44	(United States)	Conor Riley	F/D	L	33	2019	Massena, New York, United States
42	(Australia)	Lachlan Seary	F	R	24	2019	Canberra, Australian Capital Territory, Australia
29	(Australia)	Alexandre Tetreault	G	L	27–28	2015	Montreal, Quebec, Canada
61	(Switzerland)	Chris Williamson	C	R	34	2019	Okotoks, Alberta, Canada

== Transfers ==
=== In ===
Pos	Player	Transferred From	Local / Import	Source
D	(Australia) Spencer Austin	(Australia) Sydney Bears	Local	
C	(Australia) Andreas Camenzind	No team	Local	
F	(Australia) Nick Christensen	(Australia) Canberra Blades	Local	
G	(Canada) Matt Climie	(Slovenia) HDD Jesenice	Import	
D	(Australia) Nicholas Doornbos	No team	Local	
W	(Canada) Jordan Draper	(France) Scorpions de Mulhouse	Import	
W	(Canada) Jesse Gabrielle	(United States) Wichita Thunder	Import	
D	(Australia) Jackson Gallagher	(Australia) Sydney Sabres	Local	
D	(Canada) Mike Giorgi	No team	Import	
W	(Canada) Adam Kambeitz	(France) Rapaces de Gap	Import	
C	(Canada) Brayden Low	(United States) Reading Royals	Import	
F	(Australia) Joseph Maatouk	(Australia) Canberra Rebels	Local	
D	(Canada) Tyler Mayea	(Canada) Newfoundland Growlers	Import	
F	(Australia) Hamish Murray	No team	Local	
D	(Australia) Matthew Price	(Australia) Newcastle Northstars	Local	
D	(United States) Conor Riley	(United States) Adirondack Thunder	Import	
F	(Australia) Lachlan Seary	No team	Local	
C	(Switzerland) Chris Williamson	(United States) Watertown Wolves	Import	

=== Out ===
Pos	Player	Transferred To	Local / Import	Source
D	(Canada) Channing Bresciani	(Italy) HC Fassa	Import	
D	(Australia) James Byers	No team	Local	
D	(Australia) Darcy Flanagan	(Australia) Melbourne Ice	Local	
F	(Australia) Jordan Gavin	Retired	Local	
F	(United States) Trevor Gerling	(United States) Huntsville Havoc	Import	
D	(Australia) Per Daniel Göransson	No team	Local	
G	(Canada) Matt Hewitt	(Italy) HC Fassa	Import	
F	(Canada) Chris Leveille	(Canada) Brampton Beast	Import	
F	(Australia) Christopher McPhail	No team	Local	
F	(Latvia) Ainars Podzins	(France) LHC Les Lions	Import	
G	(Australia) Tynan Theobald	No team	Local	

== Staff ==
Staff Roster for 2019 AIHL season

2019 AIHL CBR Brave Staff
Role	Staff
Head coach	(Australia) Robert Starke
Assistant coach	(Australia) Max Ross
Team Manager	(Australia) Andrew Deans
Equipment Manager	(Australia) Darryl Day
Chiropractor	(Australia) Saara Stevenson
Sports Trainer	(Australia) Cameron Mohr
Personal Trainer	(Australia) Alex Zeitlhofer
Personal Trainer	(Australia) Dylan Swan
Bench official	(Australia) Darren Sault
Bench official	(Australia) Kelly Sault

== Standings ==
=== Regular season ===
Summary

Season	Overall										Home								Away							
Season	P	W	L	OW	OL	GF	GA	GD	Pts	Finish	P	W	L	OW	OL	GF	GA	GD	P	W	L	OW	OL	GF	GA	GD
2019	28	26	1	0	1	161	67	+94	79	1st	14	13	1	0	0	89	38	+51	14	13	0	0	1	72	29	+43

Position by round

Round	1	2	3	4	5	6	7	8	9	10	11	12	13	14	15	16	17	18
Position	2	1	2	2	2	2	2	1	1	1	1	1	1	1	1	1	1	1

Updated to match(es) played on Completed. Source: www.icehockeynewsaustralia.com

League table

Team	GP	W	OTW	OTL	L	GF	GA	GDF	PTS
CBR Brave	28	26	0	1	1	161	67	+94	79
Newcastle Northstars	28	16	3	0	9	127	89	+38	54
Perth Thunder	28	16	1	1	10	116	103	+13	51
Sydney Bears	28	15	2	0	11	121	102	+19	49
Melbourne Mustangs	28	12	1	4	11	108	99	+9	42
Sydney Ice Dogs	28	10	1	3	14	122	128	–6	35
Melbourne Ice	28	6	3	0	19	90	140	–50	24
Adelaide Adrenaline	28	0	0	2	26	71	188	–117	2

Qualified for the Goodall Cup playoffs	H Newman Reid Trophy winners

=== Finals ===
Summary

Season	Finals weekend							
Season	P	W	L	GF	GA	Result	Semi-final	Goodall Cup final
2019	1	–	1	4	6	Semi-finalist	Lost 4-6 (Bears)	–

Bracket

Semi-finals
1	CBR Brave	4
4	Sydney Bears	6
3	Perth Thunder	3
2	Newcastle Northstars	2

Final
Sydney Bears	5
Perth Thunder	2

== Schedule & results ==
=== Regular season ===
Matchday	1	2	3	4	5	6	7	8	9	10	11	12	13	14	15	16	17	18	19	20	21	22	23	24	25	26	27	28
Arena	A	A	A	H	A	A	H	A	H	H	H	H	A	A	A	A	A	H	H	H	A	A	A	H	H	H	H	H
Result	W	W	W	L	W	W	W	W	W	W	W	W	W	W	W	W	W	W	W	W	W	L	W	W	W	W	W	W

Updated to match(es) played on Completed. Source: AIHL
A = Away; H = Home; W = Win; L = Loss

2019 fixtures and results
Date	Time	Away	Score	Home	Location	Recap
21 April	17:00	CBR Brave	4–1	Sydney Bears	Macquarie Ice Rink	
27 April	16:30	CBR Brave	6–3	Adelaide Adrenaline	Adelaide Ice Arena	
28 April	16:30	CBR Brave	6–2	Adelaide Adrenaline	Adelaide Ice Arena	
4 May	17:30	Sydney Bears	4–3	CBR Brave	Phillip Ice Skating Centre	
11 May	16:30	CBR Brave	5–1	Perth Thunder	Perth Ice Arena	
12 May	16:30	CBR Brave	5–1	Perth Thunder	Perth Ice Arena	
18 May	17:30	Sydney Ice Dogs	3–4	CBR Brave	Phillip Ice Skating Centre	
25 May	17:00	CBR Brave	6–4	Sydney Ice Dogs	Macquarie Ice Rink	
1 June	17:30	Perth Thunder	0–7	CBR Brave	Phillip Ice Skating Centre	
2 June	16:30	Perth Thunder	2–6	CBR Brave	Phillip Ice Skating Centre	
8 June	17:30	Sydney Bears	2–5	CBR Brave	Phillip Ice Skating Centre	
9 June	16:30	Melbourne Mustangs	4–11	CBR Brave	Phillip Ice Skating Centre	
22 June	17:00	CBR Brave	6–2	Newcastle Northstars	Hunter Ice Skating Stadium	
23 June	17:00	CBR Brave	6–3	Sydney Bears	Macquarie Ice Rink	
29 June	17:00	CBR Brave	4–2	Melbourne Mustangs	O'Brien Icehouse	
30 June	14:00	CBR Brave	4–2	Melbourne Mustangs	O'Brien Icehouse	
7 July	16:45	CBR Brave	7–1	Sydney Ice Dogs	Macquarie Ice Rink	
13 July	17:30	Melbourne Ice	4–8	CBR Brave	Phillip Ice Skating Centre	
14 July	16:30	Melbourne Ice	1–5	CBR Brave	Phillip Ice Skating Centre	
20 July	17:30	Newcastle Northstars	2–3	CBR Brave	Phillip Ice Skating Centre	
21 July	16:00	CBR Brave	4–2	Newcastle Northstars	Hunter Ice Skating Stadium	
27 July	17:00	CBR Brave	2–3 (SO)	Melbourne Ice	O'Brien Icehouse	
28 July	14:00	CBR Brave	7–2	Melbourne Ice	O'Brien Icehouse	
3 August	17:30	Adelaide Adrenaline	2–7	CBR Brave	Phillip Ice Skating Centre	
4 August	16:30	Adelaide Adrenaline	4–5	CBR Brave	Phillip Ice Skating Centre	
10 August	17:30	Sydney Ice Dogs	5–12	CBR Brave	Phillip Ice Skating Centre	
11 August	16:30	Melbourne Mustangs	4–7	CBR Brave	Phillip Ice Skating Centre	
17 August	17:30	Newcastle Northstars	1–6	CBR Brave	Phillip Ice Skating Centre	

=== Finals ===
Goodall Cup semi-final

31 August 2019; 15:00	Sydney Bears	6–4 (0–1, 2–3, 4–0)	CBR Brave	Hunter Ice Skating Stadium

Game reference

Anthony Kimlin
Goalies
Matthew Climie
Referees:
Kent Unwin
Cory Ross
Linesmen:
Dan Boyd
Casper Russelhuber

	0 – 1	6:58 – Hughes (Gabrielle, Riley)
15:30 – Gauthier (Annesley)	1 – 1
	1 – 2	17:31 – Gabrielle (Camenzind, Hughes)
	1 – 3	27:24 – Darge (C.Kubara, Kambeitz)
28:33 – Dauda (Annesley, Ratcliffe)	2 – 3
	2 – 4	29:57 – B.Kubara (Dawes)
31:22 – Brücker (Newmark, Schlamp)	3 – 4
36:01 – Annesley (Gauthier)	4 – 4
46:57 – Gauthier (Schlamp, Clare)	5 – 4
49:57 – Ratcliffe (Rubes)	6 – 4

10 min
Penalties
14 min
40
Shots
30

== Player statistics ==
=== Skaters ===
Regular season
Nat	Player	Pos	M	G	A	P	PIM
(Australia)	Spencer Austin	D	2	0	1	1	0
(Australia)	Jordan Brunt	F	26	0	2	2	2
(Australia)	Andreas Camenzind	C	14	10	20	30	12
(Australia)	Nick Christensen	F	20	0	4	4	2
(Australia)	Wehebe Darge	W	28	19	34	53	20
(Australia)	Hayden Dawes	W	25	10	20	30	69
(Australia)	Nicholas Doornbos	D	11	2	1	3	0
(Canada)	Jordan Draper	W	15	17	28	45	20
(Canada)	Jesse Gabrielle	W	20	39	28	67	54
(Australia)	Jackson Gallagher	D	13	0	0	0	2
(Canada)	Mike Giorgi	D	1	0	0	0	0
(New Zealand)	Matthew Harvey	D	18	3	16	19	24
(Australia)	Mitchell Henning	F	28	3	6	9	29
(Australia)	Joseph Hughes	W	16	9	19	28	45
(Canada)	Adam Kambeitz	C/W	25	13	21	34	57
(Australia)	Bayley Kubara	D	27	1	16	17	53
(Australia)	Casey Kubara	W	24	11	15	26	20
(Australia)	Tyler Kubara	F	22	1	13	14	26
(Australia)	David Lewis	F	8	0	3	3	2
(Australia)	Jayden Lewis	F	2	0	0	0	0
(Canada)	Brayden Low	C	7	8	9	17	35
(Australia)	Joseph Maatouk	F/D	12	1	0	1	0
(Canada)	Tyler Mayea	D	7	0	9	9	6
(Australia)	Kai Miettinen	F	22	5	4	9	18
(Australia)	Hamish Murray	F	15	0	0	0	0
(Australia)	Matthew Price	D	21	1	4	5	10
(United States)	Conor Riley	F/D	14	8	21	29	55
(Australia)	Lachlan Seary	F	8	0	0	0	0
(Switzerland)	Chris Williamson	C	1	0	0	0	0

Finals
Nat	Player	Pos	M	G	A	P	PIM
(Australia)	Spencer Austin	D	–				
(Australia)	Jordan Brunt	F	1	0	0	0	0
(Australia)	Andreas Camenzind	C	1	0	1	1	4
(Australia)	Nick Christensen	F	1	0	0	0	0
(Australia)	Wehebe Darge	W	1	1	0	1	2
(Australia)	Hayden Dawes	W	1	0	1	1	0
(Australia)	Nicholas Doornbos	D	1	0	0	0	0
(Canada)	Jordan Draper	W	–				
(Canada)	Jesse Gabrielle	W	1	1	2	3	0
(Australia)	Jackson Gallagher	D	1	0	0	0	0
(Canada)	Mike Giorgi	D	–				
(New Zealand)	Matthew Harvey	D	1	0	0	0	0
(Australia)	Mitchell Henning	F	1	0	0	0	0
(Australia)	Joseph Hughes	W	1	2	1	3	0
(Canada)	Adam Kambeitz	C/W	1	0	1	1	0
(Australia)	Bayley Kubara	D	1	1	0	1	2
(Australia)	Casey Kubara	W	1	0	1	1	0
(Australia)	Tyler Kubara	F	1	0	0	0	0
(Australia)	David Lewis	F	–				
(Australia)	Jayden Lewis	F	–				
(Canada)	Brayden Low	C	–				
(Australia)	Joseph Maatouk	F/D	1	0	0	0	0
(Canada)	Tyler Mayea	D	–				
(Australia)	Kai Miettinen	F	1	0	0	0	0
(Australia)	Hamish Murray	F	1	0	0	0	0
(Australia)	Matthew Price	D	1	0	0	0	0
(United States)	Conor Riley	F/D	1	0	2	2	0
(Australia)	Lachlan Seary	F	–				
(Switzerland)	Chris Williamson	C	–				

=== Goaltenders ===
Regular season
Nat	Player	Pos	M	G	A	PIM	SO	MP	GA	GAA	SH	SA	SV%
(Canada)	Matt Climie	G	20	0	4	4	1	953	42	2.20	480	438	0.913
(Australia)	Jakob Doornbos	G	–										
(Australia)	Alexandre Tetreault	G	10	0	0	2	0	400	23	2.88	208	185	0.889

Finals
Nat	Player	Pos	M	G	A	PIM	SO	MP	GA	GAA	SH	SA	SV%
(Canada)	Matt Climie	G	1	0	0	0	0	50	6	6.00	40	34	0.850
(Australia)	Jakob Doornbos	G	–										
(Australia)	Alexandre Tetreault	G	–										

== Awards ==
Team awards for 2019 season

2019 Brave awards
Award	Recipient
Bravest of the Brave	(Canada) Matt Climie
Best Forward	(Australia) Wehebe Darge
Best Defenceman	(New Zealand) Matt Harvey
Fans Choice	(Canada) Jesse Gabrielle
Player’s Choice	(Canada) Adam Kambeitz
Coach’s Award	(Australia) Bayley Kubara
Emerging Brave	(Australia) Nick Christensen
John Lewis Memorial Award	(Australia) Murray Barton (Australia) Mandi Webb
Deans Award	(Australia) Robyn Kemp (Australia) David Kemp

AIHL awards for 2019 season

2019 AIHL awards
Award	Recipient
Goaltender of the Year	(Canada) Matt Climie
