= 2011 AIHL season =

- League: Australian Ice Hockey League
- Sport: Ice hockey
- Duration: 14 April 2011 – 4 September 2011

Regular season
- H Newman Reid Trophy: Melbourne Ice (2nd title)
- Season MVP: Jason Baclig (Ice)
- Top scorer: Addison DeBoer (85 points) (Knights)

Goodall Cup
- Champions: Melbourne Ice
- Runners-up: Newcastle North Stars
- Finals MVP: Joseph Hughes (Ice)

AIHL seasons
- ← 2010 2012 →

The 2011 AIHL season is the 12th season of the Australian Ice Hockey League (AIHL). It ran from 14 April 2011 until 28 August 2011, with the Goodall Cup finals following on 3 and 4 September. The Melbourne Ice won the H Newman Ried trophy after finishing first in the regular season standings with 65 points. The Ice also won the Goodall Cup final series after defeating the Newcastle North Stars in the final.

== Teams ==
In 2011 the AIHL had 8 teams competing in the league.

2011 AIHL teams
Team	City	Arena	Head Coach	Captain
Adelaide Adrenaline	(South Australia) Adelaide	IceArenA	(United States) Mike Gainer	(Australia) Greg Oddy
Canberra Knights	(Australian Capital Territory) Canberra	Phillip Ice Skating Centre	(United States) David Rogina	(Australia) Mark Rummukainen
Gold Coast Blue Tongues	(Queensland) Gold Coast	Iceworld Boondall	(Australia) Peter Nixon	(Australia) Ross Howell
Melbourne Ice	(Victoria (state)) Melbourne	Medibank Icehouse	(Australia) Paul Watson	(Australia) Vinnie Hughes
Mustangs IHC	(Victoria (state)) Melbourne	Medibank Icehouse	(Canada) Steve Laforet	(Australia) Shane Hardy
Newcastle North Stars	(New South Wales) Newcastle	Hunter Ice Skating Stadium	(Australia) Don Champagne	(Canada) Ray Sheffield
Sydney Bears	(New South Wales) Penrith	Penrith Ice Palace	(Australia) Vladimir Rubes	(Australia) Michael Schlamp
Sydney Ice Dogs	(New South Wales) Sydney	Liverpool Catholic Club Ice Rink	(Australia) Ron Kuprowsky	(Australia) Anthony Wilson

== League business ==
During the off-season the Australian Ice Hockey League (AIHL) announced two new teams would be joining the league. The Mustangs IHC were announced to become the eighth team in the AIHL starting in the 2011 season. The Mustangs are based at Docklands, Victoria, the home of the Melbourne Ice. The ninth team, Perth Thunder, were accepted into the league as a provisional member. The Thunder will play exhibition games against other AIHL teams during the 2011 season in order to gain the vote to be accepted for the 2012 season. At the Annual General Meeting it was proposed to increase the length of the games periods from 15 minutes to 20 minutes to be inline with International Ice Hockey Federation rules however the proposal was unsuccessful due to reasons such as costs to the teams and the ability to fill the four lines with AIHL-level players.

On 10 July the game between the Gold Coast Blue Tongues and the Sydney Ice Dogs was cancelled due to an unsafe surface at the Blue Tongues home venue, Bundall Iceland. The AIHL deemed that the Blue Tongues have forfeited the game against the Ice Dogs 5–0, with the Ice Dogs being awarded the full three points.

From 20 to 21 August the Australia men's national ice hockey team will field a team at the 2011 New Zealand Winter Games so only two games will be held for that weekend.

=== Player transfers ===
Date	Player	New team	Previous team	Ref
18 January 2011	(United Kingdom) David Phillips	Adelaide Adrenaline	Toledo Walleye	
19 January 2011	(United Kingdom) Kevin Phillips	Adelaide Adrenaline	Braehead Clan	
10 February 2011	(Canada) Kurtis Dulle	Sydney Bears	Hull Stingrays	
24 February 2011	(United States) Sean Scarbrough	Adelaide Adrenaline	Canberra Knights	
3 March 2011	(Canada) Jordan Hale	Sydney Bears	Camrose Kodiaks	
14 March 2011	(United States) Jacques Perreault	Melbourne Ice	Quad City Mallards	
17 March 2011	(Czech Republic) Josef Rezek	Adelaide Adrenaline	HC Milevsko	
23 March 2011	(Sweden) Bob Sannemo	Gold Coast Blue Tongues	Östersund Hockey	
23 March 2011	(Sweden) Tobias Falk	Gold Coast Blue Tongues	Östersund Hockey	
23 March 2011	(United States) Peter Cartwright	Newcastle North Stars	Dundee Stars	
4 April 2011	(Canada) Brook Robson	Sydney Ice Dogs	Peter North Stars	
8 April 2011	(United States) Obi Aduba	Melbourne Ice	Quad City Mallards	
11 April 2011	(Netherlands) Tony Demelinne	Sydney Bears	HYS The Hague	
14 April 2011	(Canada) Justin Chwedoruk	Newcastle North Stars	Rødovre Mighty Bulls	
14 April 2011	(United States) Scott Thauwald	Newcastle North Stars	Nijmegen Devils	
20 April 2011	(Canada) Justin Sawyer	Gold Coast Blue Tongues	Odessa Jackalopes	
20 April 2011	(Canada) Sheldon Baerg	Sydney Bears	Concordia Stingers	
22 April 2011	(United States) Ricky Helmbrecht	Sydney Ice Dogs	Wasquehal Lions	
22 April 2011	(Canada) Mitch Bye	Sydney Ice Dogs	Marian University	
7 June 2011	(United Kingdom) Geoff O'Hara	Sydney Bears	Bristol Pitbulls	
24 June 2011	(United States) Anthony Ciraulo	Canberra Knights	Bloomington PrairieThunder	
28 June 2011	(Canada) Jason Lindner	Canberra Knights	Indiana Blizzard	
	(United States) Addison DeBoer	Canberra Knights	Laredo Bucks	

== Exhibition games ==
Prior to the regular season, the Sydney Bears hosted an exhibition All-Star event and match at the Penrith Ice Palace. The All Star Classic had the Bears Veterans (over 35's) face off against the Rookies (Under 35s). The Rookies team won the All Star Classic 9–5.

During the season three teams competed against the AIHL's provisional member, Perth Thunder, in order for the Thunder to gain entry into the league for the following season. In May the Thunder travelled to Adelaide to compete in two games against the Adelaide Adrenaline. They drew the first game 2–2 and won the second 3–0. In June the Melbourne Ice travelled to Perth to compete in two games against the Thunder at the Cockburn Ice Arena. The Ice won the first game 4–3 and lost the second game 3–6 after letting in six goals to none in the final period. In September the Newcastle North Stars traveled to Perth to play the Thunder in a two-game series. The Thunder won both the first and second game 4–2.

== Regular season ==
The Melbourne Ice won the H Newman Reid Trophy after finishing first in the regular season standings with 65 points. Last years winners, the Newcastle North Stars finished second with 59 points. Jason Baclig of the Melbourne Ice was named the 2011 AIHL MVP edging out the Gold Coast Blue Tongues' Matt Amado and Sydney Ice Dogs' Matt Monaghan.

=== April ===
Game	Date	Time	Away	Score	Home	Location	Attendance	Recap
1	14 April	20:00	Melbourne Ice	8–4	Mustangs IHC	Melbourne		
2	16 April	17:00	Adelaide Adrenaline	3–7	Newcastle North Stars	Newcastle	800	
3	16 April	19:30	Mustangs IHC	6–2	Sydney Bears	Penrith		
4	17 April	17:00	Adelaide Adrenaline	3 – 2 (SO)	Sydney Bears	Penrith		
5	17 April	17:00	Mustangs IHC	6–7	Newcastle North Stars	Newcastle	700	
6	23 April	17:30	Newcastle North Stars	7–3	Canberra Knights	Canberra		
7	23 April	17:45	Sydney Ice Dogs	2–6	Melbourne Ice	Melbourne		
8	24 April	16:15	Sydney Ice Dogs	6–3	Mustangs IHC	Melbourne		
9	28 April	20:00	Sydney Bears	2–4	Newcastle North Stars	Newcastle	600	
10	30 April	16:00	Newcastle North Stars	6–2	Gold Coast Blue Tongues	Gold Coast		
11	30 April	17:30	Melbourne Ice	6–5	Canberra Knights	Canberra		
12	30 April	17:45	Adelaide Adrenaline	3–5	Mustangs IHC	Melbourne	250	

=== May ===
Game	Date	Time	Away	Score	Home	Location	Attendance	Recap
13	1 May	16:00	Newcastle North Stars	7–6	Gold Coast Blue Tongues	Gold Coast	150	
14	1 May	16:15	Adelaide Adrenaline	2–5	Mustangs IHC	Melbourne		
15	1 May	17:00	Melbourne Ice	3–2	Sydney Ice Dogs	Liverpool		
16	7 May	16:30	Gold Coast Blue Tongues	4 – 5 (SO)	Adelaide Adrenaline	Adelaide		
17	7 May	17:00	Newcastle North Stars	4–6	Sydney Ice Dogs	Liverpool		
18	7 May	17:30	Sydney Bears	3–5	Canberra Knights	Canberra		
19	7 May	17:45	Mustangs IHC	5 – 4 (SO)	Melbourne Ice	Melbourne		
20	8 May	16:30	Gold Coast Blue Tongues	3–5	Adelaide Adrenaline	Adelaide		
21	8 May	17:00	Canberra Knights	1–9	Sydney Ice Dogs	Liverpool		
22	8 May	17:00	Newcastle North Stars	6–2	Sydney Bears	Penrith		
23	14 May	16:00	Canberra Knights	3–6	Gold Coast Blue Tongues	Gold Coast		
24	14 May	17:00	Adelaide Adrenaline	3–4	Newcastle North Stars	Newcastle	850	
25	14 May	17:45	Sydney Bears	3 – 4 (SO)	Melbourne Ice	Melbourne		
26	15 May	16:00	Canberra Knights	1–8	Gold Coast Blue Tongues	Gold Coast		
27	15 May	16:15	Sydney Bears	5–3	Mustangs IHC	Melbourne		
28	15 May	17:00	Adelaide Adrenaline	2–4	Sydney Ice Dogs	Liverpool		
29	21 May	17:00	Gold Coast Blue Tongues	3–8	Sydney Ice Dogs	Liverpool		
30	21 May	17:30	Sydney Bears	5–10	Canberra Knights	Canberra		
31	21 May	17:45	Newcastle North Stars	4 – 5 (SO)	Melbourne Ice	Melbourne		
32	22 May	16:15	Newcastle North Stars	2–5	Mustangs IHC	Melbourne		
33	22 May	17:00	Gold Coast Blue Tongues	6–3	Sydney Bears	Penrith		
34	28 May	16:30	Sydney Ice Dogs	0–2	Adelaide Adrenaline	Adelaide		
35	28 May	17:00	Melbourne Ice	4–5	Newcastle North Stars	Newcastle		
36	28 May	17:45	Canberra Knights	5–4	Mustangs IHC	Melbourne		
37	29 May	16:15	Sydney Ice Dogs	3–9	Mustangs IHC	Melbourne		
38	29 May	16:30	Canberra Knights	2–7	Adelaide Adrenaline	Adelaide		
39	29 May	17:00	Melbourne Ice	8–1	Sydney Bears	Penrith		

=== June ===
Game	Date	Time	Away	Score	Home	Location	Attendance	Recap
40	2 June	20:00	Mustangs IHC	1–5	Melbourne Ice	Melbourne		
41	4 June	16:00	Mustangs IHC	5–8	Gold Coast Blue Tongues	Gold Coast		
42	4 June	17:00	Sydney Bears	5 – 4 (SO)	Newcastle North Stars	Newcastle	800	
43	4 June	17:30	Sydney Ice Dogs	8–4	Canberra Knights	Canberra		
44	4 June	17:45	Adelaide Adrenaline	3 – 2 (SO)	Melbourne Ice	Melbourne		
45	5 June	16:00	Mustangs IHC	4–6	Gold Coast Blue Tongues	Gold Coast		
46	5 June	16:15	Adelaide Adrenaline	2–4	Melbourne Ice	Melbourne		
47	5 June	17:00	Canberra Knights	6–8	Sydney Bears	Penrith		
48	11 June	17:30	Mustangs IHC	5–2	Canberra Knights	Canberra		
49	12 June	17:00	Canberra Knights	3–9	Newcastle North Stars	Newcastle		
50	12 June	17:00	Mustangs IHC	1–8	Sydney Ice Dogs	Liverpool		
51	18 June	16:00	Adelaide Adrenaline	5–0	Gold Coast Blue Tongues	Gold Coast		
52	18 June	17:00	Mustangs IHC	4–9	Newcastle North Stars	Newcastle	900	
53	18 June	17:30	Melbourne Ice	7–4	Canberra Knights	Canberra		
54	19 June	16:00	Adelaide Adrenaline	4–3	Gold Coast Blue Tongues	Gold Coast		
55	19 June	17:00	Melbourne Ice	7–3	Sydney Ice Dogs	Liverpool		
56	19 June	17:00	Mustangs IHC	3 – 4 (SO)	Sydney Bears	Penrith		
57	25 June	16:30	Sydney Bears	3–6	Adelaide Adrenaline	Adelaide		
58	25 June	17:00	Newcastle North Stars	7–4	Sydney Ice Dogs	Liverpool		
59	25 June	17:30	Gold Coast Blue Tongues	10–3	Canberra Knights	Canberra		
60	25 June	17:45	Melbourne Ice	7–3	Mustangs IHC	Melbourne		
61	26 June	16:45	Sydney Bears	2–3	Melbourne Ice	Melbourne		
62	26 June	17:30	Gold Coast Blue Tongues	5–7	Canberra Knights	Canberra		

=== July ===
Game	Date	Time	Away	Score	Home	Location	Attendance	Recap
63	2 July	16:30	Melbourne Ice	5 – 6 (SO)	Adelaide Adrenaline	Adelaide		
64	2 July	17:00	Gold Coast Blue Tongues	0–5	Sydney Ice Dogs	Liverpool		
65	2 July	17:30	Newcastle North Stars	4–14	Canberra Knights	Canberra		
66	3 July	16:30	Melbourne Ice	2 – 3 (SO)	Adelaide Adrenaline	Adelaide		
67	3 July	17:00	Gold Coast Blue Tongues	7–5	Sydney Bears	Penrith		
68	9 July	16:00	Sydney Ice Dogs	1–7	Gold Coast Blue Tongues	Gold Coast		
69	9 July	16:30	Mustangs IHC	3–5	Adelaide Adrenaline	Adelaide		
70	9 July	17:00	Newcastle North Stars	4–2	Sydney Bears	Penrith		
71	9 July	17:45	Canberra Knights	2–8	Melbourne Ice	Melbourne		
72	10 July	16:00	Sydney Ice Dogs	5 – 0^{[I]}	Gold Coast Blue Tongues	Gold Coast	—	—
73	10 July	16:45	Canberra Knights	5–8	Melbourne Ice	Melbourne		
74	10 July	16:30	Mustangs IHC	4 – 3 (SO)	Adelaide Adrenaline	Adelaide		
75	16 July	17:00	Melbourne Ice	4–3	Newcastle North Stars	Newcastle		
76	16 July	17:00	Sydney Ice Dogs	6–4	Sydney Bears	Penrith		
77	16 July	17:30	Adelaide Adrenaline	4–6	Canberra Knights	Canberra		
78	17 July	17:00	Adelaide Adrenaline	1–3	Sydney Ice Dogs	Liverpool		
79	17 July	17:00	Melbourne Ice	8–4	Sydney Bears	Penrith		
80	23 July	16:00	Sydney Bears	4 – 5 (SO)	Gold Coast Blue Tongues	Gold Coast		
81	23 July	16:30	Newcastle North Stars	5–3	Adelaide Adrenaline	Adelaide		
82	23 July	17:30	Mustangs IHC	2–8	Canberra Knights	Canberra		
83	24 July	16:00	Sydney Bears	2–5	Gold Coast Blue Tongues	Gold Coast		
84	24 July	16:15	Newcastle North Stars	4–6	Melbourne Ice	Melbourne		
85	24 July	17:00	Mustangs IHC	1–3	Sydney Ice Dogs	Liverpool		
86	30 July	17:00	Canberra Knights	0–4	Newcastle North Stars	Newcastle		
87	30 July	17:00	Sydney Bears	2–5	Sydney Ice Dogs	Liverpool		
88	30 July	17:45	Gold Coast Blue Tongues	2 – 3 (SO)	Melbourne Ice	Melbourne		
89	31 July	16:15	Gold Coast Blue Tongues	6–4	Mustangs IHC	Melbourne		
90	31 July	17:00	Sydney Ice Dogs	4 – 3 (SO)	Newcastle North Stars	Newcastle		
91	31 July	17:00	Canberra Knights	3–2	Sydney Bears	Penrith		

I Game was forfeited due to poor ice conditions.

=== August ===
Game	Date	Time	Away	Score	Home	Location	Attendance	Recap
92	6 August	16:00	Melbourne Ice	3–5	Gold Coast Blue Tongues	Gold Coast		
93	6 August	16:30	Sydney Bears	1–10	Adelaide Adrenaline	Adelaide		
94	6 August	17:30	Sydney Ice Dogs	6–4	Canberra Knights	Canberra		
95	6 August	17:45	Newcastle North Stars	3–2	Mustangs IHC	Melbourne		
96	7 August	16:00	Melbourne Ice	5–3	Gold Coast Blue Tongues	Gold Coast		
97	7 August	16:15	Sydney Bears	2–3	Mustangs IHC	Melbourne		
98	7 August	16:30	Newcastle North Stars	3 – 2 (SO)	Adelaide Adrenaline	Adelaide		
99	13 August	17:00	Sydney Bears	0–7	Sydney Ice Dogs	Liverpool		
100	13 August	17:30	Adelaide Adrenaline	7–4	Canberra Knights	Canberra		
101	13 August	17:45	Gold Coast Blue Tongues	1–6	Melbourne Ice	Melbourne		
102	14 August	16:15	Gold Coast Blue Tongues	4–2	Mustangs IHC	Melbourne		
103	14 August	17:00	Sydney Ice Dogs	1–3	Newcastle North Stars	Newcastle		
104	14 August	17:00	Adelaide Adrenaline	7–3	Sydney Bears	Penrith		
105	20 August	17:00	Canberra Knights	2–3	Sydney Ice Dogs	Liverpool		
106	21 August	17:00	Sydney Ice Dogs	4–2	Sydney Bears	Penrith		
107	27 August	16:30	Canberra Knights	5–7	Adelaide Adrenaline	Adelaide		
108	27 August	17:00	Gold Coast Blue Tongues	4–2	Newcastle North Stars	Newcastle		
109	27 August	17:45	Sydney Ice Dogs	6 – 5 (SO)	Melbourne Ice	Melbourne		
110	28 August	16:15	Canberra Knights	2–5	Mustangs IHC	Melbourne		
111	28 August	16:30	Sydney Ice Dogs	2–4	Adelaide Adrenaline	Adelaide		
112	28 August	17:00	Gold Coast Blue Tongues	1–2	Newcastle North Stars	Newcastle		

=== Standings ===
Team	GP	W	OTW	OTL	L	GF	GA	GDF	PCT	PTS
Melbourne Ice	28	18	3	5	2	146	93	+53	0.774	65
Newcastle North Stars	28	18	1	3	6	132	106	+26	0.702	59
Sydney Ice Dogs	28	17	2	0	9	124	90	+34	0.655	55
Adelaide Adrenaline	28	12	5	2	9	117	94	+23	0.571	48
Gold Coast Blue Tongues	28	13	1	2	12	120	115	+5	0.512	43
Mustangs IHC	28	8	2	1	17	107	132	−23	0.345	29
Canberra Knights	28	8	0	0	20	119	167	−48	0.286	24
Sydney Bears	28	2	2	3	21	83	151	−68	0.155	13

Qualified for the Goodall Cup playoffs	H Newman Reid Trophy winners

=== Statistics ===
==== Scoring leaders ====
List shows the ten top skaters sorted by points, then goals.

Player	Team	GP	G	A	Pts	PIM	POS
Addison DeBoer	Canberra Knights	28	32	53	85	50	F
Brit Ouellette	Canberra Knights	26	32	45	77	62	F
Peter Cartwright	Newcastle North Stars	28	36	39	75	24	F
Matt Amado	Gold Coast Blue Tongues	27	42	27	69	67	F
Jason Baclig	Melbourne Ice	28	36	32	68	20	F
Brian Bales	Newcastle North Stars	28	34	31	65	26	F
Tobias Falk	Gold Coast Blue Tongues	28	29	36	65	26	F
Justin Chwedoruk	Newcastle North Stars	28	28	29	57	72	F
Joseph Hughes	Melbourne Ice	28	25	31	56	121	F
Mike McRae	Gold Coast Blue Tongues	24	19	34	53	87	F

==== Leading goaltenders ====
Only the top five goaltenders, based on save percentage with a minimum of ten games played.

Player	Team	MIP	SOG	GA	GAA	SVS%	SO
Luke Fiveash	Gold Coast Blue Tongues	540	343	38	3.17	88.9	0
Matthew Ezzy	Newcastle North Stars	1221	800	92	3.39	88.5	1
Olivier Martin	Adelaide Adrenaline	1159	671	82	3.18	87.8	2
Chris J. Anderson	Gold Coast Blue Tongues	450	340	47	4.70	86.2	0
Sheldon Baerg	Sydney Bears	950	755	109	5.16	85.6	0

== Goodall Cup playoffs ==
The 2011 Finals weekend started on 3 September 2011, with the Goodall Cup final being held on 4 September 2011. Following the end of the regular season the top four teams advanced to the playoff series. Melbourne Ice who finished first in the standings was drawn against the Adelaide Adrenaline who finished fourth in the first semi-final match, while the second semi-final was played between the second and third ranked teams, Newcastle North Stars and Sydney Ice Dogs. The series was a single game elimination with the two winning semi-finalists advancing to the Goodall Cup final. All three games were held at the National Ice Sports Centre (Icehouse) in Melbourne, Victoria. The Melbourne Ice went back-to-back and won the Goodall Cup for the second year in a row after defeating the Newcastle North Stars in the final 3–2. Australian forward, Joseph Hughes, of the Melbourne Ice was named the finals MVP after the final.

Semifinals
1	Melbourne Ice	8
4	Adelaide Adrenaline	3
3	Newcastle North Stars	5
2	Sydney Ice Dogs	2

Final
Melbourne Ice	3
Newcastle North Stars	2

All times are UTC+10:00

=== Semi-finals ===
3 September 2011; 16:00	Melbourne Ice	8–3 (3–2, 3–0, 2–1)	Adelaide Adrenaline	Icehouse, Melbourne; Attendance: 1250

Game reference

Stuart Denman
Goalies
Olivier Martin
Referee:
Jamie Miller
Linesmen:
Keith Unwin
Greg Madsen

	0 – 1	1:08 – Scarbrough (Oddy)
6:59 – Hughes (Baclig, Perreault) (PP)	1 – 1
10:37 – Armstrong (Hughes, Powell) (PP)	2 – 1
	2 – 2	12:04 – Delsar (Huxley, Harding)
12:28 – Webster (Aduba)	3 – 2
22:33 – Armstrong	4 – 2
25:12 – Aduba (Powell, Baclig)	5 – 2
26:21 – Baclig (Armstrong, Powell)	6 – 2
38:48 – Hughes (Aduba)	7 – 2
	7 – 3	41:15 – Rezek (Harding)
43:13 – Armstrong (Hughes)	8 – 3

6 min
Penalties
8 min
29
Shots
15

3 September 2011; 19:30	Newcastle North Stars	5–2 (1–0, 2–1, 2–1)	Sydney Ice Dogs	Icehouse, Melbourne; Attendance: 958

Game reference

Matthew Ezzy
Goalies
James Herbert
Referee:
Jeff Scott
Linesmen:
Tim Bell
Daryl Hamilton

2:22 – Chwedoruk (Cartwright, Bales)	1 – 0
	1 – 1	16:15 – Stephenson
20:10 – Bales (Thauwald, Chwedoruk)	2 – 1
26:48 – Chwedoruk (Cartwright)	3 – 1
30:24 – Cartwright (Starke, Bales)	4 – 1
	4 – 2	39:28 – Monaghan (Helmbrecht, Manco)
43:15 – Cartwright (Starke) (EN)	5 – 2

51 min
Penalties
53 min
17
Shots
36

=== Final ===
4 September 2011; 16:00	Melbourne Ice	3–2 (1–1, 1–0, 1–1)	Newcastle North Stars	Icehouse, Melbourne; Attendance: 1400

Game reference

Stuart Denman
Goalies
Matthew Ezzy
Referee:
Jeff Scott
Linesmen:
Tim Bell
Daryl Hamilton

	0 – 1	6:44 – Cartwright (Thauwald, Bales)
10:14 – Armstrong (Powell)	1 – 1
16:49 – Hughes (Perreault, Aduba)	2 – 1
40:25 – Webster (Hughes)	3 – 1
	3 – 2	43:00 – Chwedoruk (Thauwald, Cartwright) (PP)

6 min
Penalties
4 min
32
Shots
13
