= 2019 AIHL season =

- League: Australian Ice Hockey League
- Sport: Ice hockey
- Duration: 20 April 2019 – 25 August 2019

Regular season
- H Newman Reid Trophy: CBR Brave (2nd title)
- Season MVP: Dylan Quaile (Northstars)
- Top scorer: Tim Crowder (77 points) (Ice Dogs)

Goodall Cup
- Champions: Sydney Bears
- Runners-up: Perth Thunder
- Finals MVP: Danick Gaultier (Bears)

AIHL seasons
- 2018 2020

The 2019 AIHL season is the 20th season of the Australian Ice Hockey League (AIHL). It ran from 20 April 2019 until 25 August 2019, with the Goodall Cup finals following on 31 August and 1 September 2019. The CBR Brave won the H Newman Reid Trophy after finishing the regular season with the most points in league history for the second time. The Sydney Bears won the Goodall Cup for the third time by defeating the Perth Thunder in the final.

== Teams ==
In 2019 the AIHL had 8 teams competing in the league.

2019 AIHL teams
Team	City	Arena	Head Coach	Captain
Adelaide Adrenaline	(South Australia) Adelaide	IceArenA	(Australia) Jim Fuyarchuk	(Australia) Josef Rezek
CBR Brave	(Australian Capital Territory) Canberra	Phillip Ice Skating Centre	(Australia) Robert Starke	(New Zealand) Matthew Harvey
Melbourne Ice	(Victoria (state)) Melbourne	O'Brien Icehouse	(Australia) Brad Vigon	(Australia) Lliam Webster
Melbourne Mustangs	(Victoria (state)) Melbourne	O'Brien Icehouse	(Canada) Maxime Langelier-Parent	(Australia) Michael McMahon
Newcastle Northstars	(New South Wales) Newcastle	Hunter Ice Skating Stadium	(Australia) John Kennedy	(Australia) Robert Malloy
Perth Thunder	(Western Australia) Perth	Perth Ice Arena	(Australia) Dave Ruck	(Australia) Jamie Woodman
Sydney Bears	(New South Wales) Sydney	Macquarie Ice Rink	(Australia) Ron Kuprowsky	(Australia) Michael Schlamp
Sydney Ice Dogs	(New South Wales) Sydney	Macquarie Ice Rink	(Australia) Andrew Petrie	(Australia) Tomas Manco

== League business ==
In January the Newcastle Northstars signed a three-year naming rights deal with Newcastle Rescue and Consultancy. Proski, the former naming rights holder, will continue to sponsor the club at a lower level. In March the Newcastle Northstars unveiled a new red-coloured third jersey design featuring an alternative logo. The logo is made up an upper-case letter N on top of a five pointed star. On 19 March the Adelaide Adrenaline signed a naming rights deal with Agile Group. The deal starts in the 2019 season and runs through to the end of the 2021 season. On 28 March it was announced that the CBR Brave had been acquired by the Canberra Cavalry, a baseball team that plays in the Australian Baseball League. Cavalry management took over operations of the Brave immediately while full ownership is expected to be transferred later in the year. 3 April 2019, O’Brien Group announced the completion of upgrades to their Melbourne stadium including 1,361 solar panels, two water tanks and an environmentally-friendly heating system. The new facilities would generate 400 kW of power, providing a 25% saving on the stadium's power bill. To mark the completion of the new upgrades the stadium was renamed O’Brien Icehouse, invoking and recognising the stadium's original name. On 19 April the CBR Brave signed a naming rights deal with the Signal Co. Wireless for the 2019 season. The deal increases The Signal Co. Wireless' level of sponsorship having been a major sponsor in 2018. On 31 May it was announced that the Melbourne Mustangs had signed an affiliation with the Melbourne Chargers of the Australian Women's Tier 2 Show Case Series, Australia's second highest women's ice hockey league.

=== Exhibition games ===
On 30 and 31 March the Melbourne Ice hosted Hockey X 2019 at the O'Brien Icehouse. Hockey X, previously known as the Hockey Festival, included the CBR Brave, Melbourne Ice, Melbourne Mustangs and an All-Star team from Queensland. Day one of the festival saw each team compete in a round-robin competition to determine the playoff spots on day two. The Melbourne Mustangs finished the round-robin at the top of the standings, three points ahead of the Melbourne Ice. The CBR Brave finished in third and the Queensland All-Stars in last place. Day two included two games, a final between first and second and a placement game for third place. The Melbourne Mustangs defeated the Melbourne Ice 3–1 in the final to claim the Warrior Cup, while the CBR Brave beat the Queensland All-Stars 3–0 to finish third. On 13 April the Melbourne Ice and Melbourne Mustangs held their annual exhibition match at the O'Brien Icehouse. The Mustangs defeated the Ice 4–2. On the same day the Adelaide Adrenaline held an exhibition game against a South Australian All Stars team which the Adrenaline won 4–3. The following day the Newcastle Northstars held a practice match against their affiliate club, the Newcastle North Stars ECSL at the Hunter Ice Skating Stadium. The Northstars won the match 10–2.

=== Personnel changes ===
On 23 November the Melbourne Ice announced the signing of Johan Steenberg to the position of Director of Operations. Steenberg returns to the Ice after a year with the CBR Brave where he acted as their Director of Player Development and Player Personnel. Steenberg was previously the Ice's goaltender coach from 2014 to 2017. The following month the Melbourne Ice appointed Australian men's national team head coach Brad Vigon to the position of head coach. Vigon replaces interim head coach Sandy Gardner who had been in the role since June 2018. Gardner was subsequently appointed an assistant coach role along with Brent Laver and Glen Mayer Laver moves into the role having been the development coach for the last two seasons and Mayer was previously an assistant coach at the Ice from 2014 to 2016. On 7 December the AIHL announced that Rob Bannerman had stepped down as commissioner due to a career move in the United States. Bannerman had been in the position for the past six years. In March the Melbourne Ice appointed Mark Smith to the position of general manager. Smith is currently head coach of the Melbourne Ice Women's team. On 28 February the Newcastle Northstars announced the signing of John Kennedy as head coach following his retirement as a player. Kennedy will be assisted by associated coaches Joe Theriault and Ray Sheffield. On 10 April the CBR Brave announced the signing of former Ligue Magnus player Max Ross to the position of assistant coach.

=== Player transfers ===
==== Interclub transfers ====
Nat	Player	Previous team	New team	Ref
(Sweden)	Sebastian Andersson	Adelaide Adrenaline	Melbourne Ice	
(Australia)	Spencer Austin	Sydney Bears	CBR Brave	
(Australia)	Michael Breedveld	Melbourne Ice	Melbourne Mustangs	
(Australia)	Jonathon Bremner	Perth Thunder	Melbourne Ice	
(Australia)	Lachlan Fahmy*	Sydney Bears	Sydney Ice Dogs	
(Australia)	Kayne Fedor	Sydney Bears	Adelaide Adrenaline	
(Australia)	Darcy Flanagan	CBR Brave	Melbourne Ice	
(Australia)	Robert Haselhurst	Newcastle Northstars	Perth Thunder	
(Australia)	Jermaine Joyce	Melbourne Mustangs	Melbourne Ice	
(Australia)	Paul Lazzarotto	Melbourne Mustangs	Melbourne Ice	
(Australia)	Thomas Munro	Perth Thunder	Melbourne Ice	
(Australia)	Nicholas Novysedlak	Melbourne Mustangs	Sydney Ice Dogs	
(New Zealand)	Jaden Pine-Murphy	Melbourne Ice	Melbourne Mustangs	
(Australia)	Matthew Price	Newcastle Northstars	CBR Brave	
(Australia)	Jeremy Vasquez*	Sydney Bears	Sydney Ice Dogs	

* Mid-season transfer.

==== Retirements ====
Nat	Player	Team	New role	Ref
(Canada)	Nathan Chiarlitti	Sydney Ice Dogs	—	
(Canada)	Scott Corbett	Melbourne Ice	—	
(Australia)	Cass Delsar	Melbourne Ice	—	
(Australia)	Jordan Gavin	CBR Brave	—	

==== New signings ====
Nat	Player	Previous team	New team	Ref
(Sweden)	Henrik Ahlin	Reach Rebels	Sydney Ice Dogs	
(United States)	Garrett Bartus	Greenville Swamp Rabbits	Sydney Ice Dogs	
(Australia)	Connor Bolger	Sydney Wolf Pack	Sydney Ice Dogs	
(Australia)	Andreas Camenzind	No team	CBR Brave	
(Australia)	Andrew Chen	Adelaide Generals	Adelaide Adrenaline	
(Australia)	Nick Christensen	Canberra Blades	CBR Brave	
(Canada)	Matt Climie	HDD Jesenice	CBR Brave	
(Canada)	Paul Crowder	Fife Flyers	Sydney Ice Dogs	
(Canada)	Tim Crowder	Coventry Blaze	Sydney Ice Dogs	
(New Zealand)	Tristan Darling	Dunedin Thunder	Melbourne Mustangs	
(Slovakia)	Adam Dauda	Colgate University	Sydney Bears	
(Australia)	Nicholas Doornbos	No team	CBR Brave	
(Canada)	Jordan Draper	Scorpions de Mulhouse	CBR Brave	
(Canada)	Francis Drolet	Diables Rouges de Briançon	Newcastle Northstars	
(Australia)	Lachlan Fahmy	South Shore Kings	Sydney Bears	
(Canada)	Thomas Flack	Saint Michael's College	Melbourne Mustangs	
(Slovakia)	Dominik Gabaj	Bisons de Neuilly-sur-Marne	Newcastle Northstars	
(Canada)	Jesse Gabrielle	Wichita Thunder	CBR Brave	
(Australia)	Jackson Gallagher	Sydney Sabres	CBR Brave	
(Canada)	Alexandre Gauthier	Nicolet Condors	Adelaide Adrenaline	
(Canada)	Danick Gauthier	Fife Flyers	Sydney Bears	
(New Zealand)	Benjamin Gavoille	Dunedin Thunder	Adelaide Adrenaline	
(Canada)	Jake Gilmour	No team	Perth Thunder	
(Canada)	Mike Giorgi	No team	CBR Brave	
(Canada)	Jesse Gordichuk	University of Nevada, Las Vegas	Adelaide Adrenaline	
(Switzerland)	Kyllian Guyenet	HC Sierre-Anniviers	Sydney Bears	
(Australia)	Sean Hamilton	Northern Vikings	Perth Thunder	
(Australia)	Marcus Hosen	No team	Sydney Ice Dogs	
(Australia)	Jeff Hu	Melbourne Glaciers	Melbourne Ice	
(United States)	Christian Isackson	No team	Melbourne Mustangs	
(Canada)	Adam Kambeitz	Rapaces de Gap	CBR Brave	
(Australia)	Thomas Kiliwnik	Brisbane Blitz	Newcastle Northstars	
(Australia)	Jake Knott	Nudo Bombers	Sydney Ice Dogs	
(Czech Republic)	Jan Koubek	Sydney Sting	Sydney Bears	
(Canada)	Kasey Kulczycki	Birmingham Bulls	Melbourne Ice	
(Australia)	Lee Lambert	Blackhawks IHC	Melbourne Mustangs	
(Canada)	William Lameroux	Reach Rebels	Sydney Bears	
(New Zealand)	Jaxson Lane	Canterbury Red Devils	Melbourne Mustangs	
(Canada)	Maxime Langelier-Parent	No team	Melbourne Mustangs	
(Australia)	Dylan Lavery	Penrith Raptors	Sydney Ice Dogs	
(Australia)	Connor Lee	Steele County Blades	Sydney Ice Dogs	
(Australia)	Yannic Lodge	Tranås AIF J20	Perth Thunder	
(Canada)	Brayden Low	Reading Royals	CBR Brave	
(Australia)	Taylor Luck	Blackhawks IHC	Melbourne Ice	
(Sweden)	Jacob Lundgren	Halmstad Hammers HC J20	Melbourne Ice	
(Australia)	Joseph Maatouk	Canberra Rebels	CBR Brave	
(Canada)	Joey MacDougall	Adelaide Tigers	Adelaide Adrenaline	
(Canada)	Louick Marcotte	Rivière-du-Loup 3L	Perth Thunder	
(Canada)	Tyler Mayea	Newfoundland Growlers	CBR Brave	
(Australia)	Marcel McGuiness	Adelaide Red Wings	Adelaide Adrenaline	
(Australia)	Austin McKenzie	No team	Melbourne Ice	
(Australia)	Cooper Metcalf	No team	Melbourne Mustangs	
(Australia)	Matt Monaghan	No team	Sydney Ice Dogs	
(United States)	Chris Moquin	Southern New Hampshire University	Sydney Bears	
(Australia)	Hamish Murray	No team	CBR Brave	
(Canada)	Kevin Nastiuk	Stony Plain Eagles	Melbourne Mustangs	
(Canada)	Kyle Neuber	No team	Adelaide Adrenaline	
(Australia)	Tim Newmark	Français Volants	Sydney Bears	
(Canada)	Jordan Owens	Sheffield Steelers	Melbourne Mustangs	
(Australia)	Nathan Pedretti	Saints Monarchs	Melbourne Ice	
(Canada)	Trey Phillips	Fort Wayne Komets	Newcastle Northstars	
(United States)	J.M. Piotrowski	Yale University	Melbourne Ice	
(Canada)	Dylan Quaile	Rapid City Rush	Sydney Ice Dogs	
(Australia)	Jack Ransome	Reach Rebels	Sydney Ice Dogs	
(New Zealand)	Jacob Ratcliffe	Westfield State University	Sydney Bears	
(United States)	Conor Riley	Adirondack Thunder	CBR Brave	
(Sweden)	Taegan Rippon	Reach Rebels	Sydney Bears	
(Australia)	Jayden Ryan	Penrith Raptors	Newcastle Northstars	
(Australia)	Alistair Rye	Newcastle North Stars ECSL	Newcastle Northstars	
(Australia)	Connor Schultz	Sydney Sabres	Newcastle Northstars	
(Canada)	Jesse Schwartz	Roanoke Rail Yard Dawgs	Melbourne Ice	
(Australia)	Lachlan Seary	No team	CBR Brave	
(Canada)	Luke Simpson	Lacombe Generals	Newcastle Northstars	
(Czech Republic)	Ondrej Smach	Gothiques d'Amiens	Newcastle Northstars	
(United States)	Thomas Stahlhuth	Colby College	Melbourne Ice	
(Finland)	Samuel Sweatman	Melbourne Glaciers	Melbourne Ice	
(Australia)	Daniel Taylor	No team	Sydney Bears	
(Canada)	Parker Thomas	University of Saskatchewan	Melbourne Mustangs	
(Australia)	Shaun Tobin	No team	Perth Thunder	
(Canada)	Keven Veilleux	Rivière-du-Loup 3L	Perth Thunder	
(Australia)	Gabriel Veyt	The Hill Academy U18 Prep	Melbourne Ice	
(Canada)	Justin Vienneau	Aigles de La Roche sur Yon	Sydney Bears	
(Finland)	Nico Vikstén	SaPKo	Perth Thunder	
(Australia)	Darren Wade	Newcastle North Stars ECSL	Newcastle Northstars	
(Canada)	Chris Williamson	Watertown Wolves	CBR Brave	
(Australia)	Adam Wise	Adelaide Falcons	Adelaide Adrenaline	
(Australia)	Sebastian Woodlands	A21 Academy	Adelaide Adrenaline	
(Australia)	Andrew Zolotarev	Adelaide Falcons	Adelaide Adrenaline	

==== Players lost ====
Nat	Player	Previous team	New team	Ref
(Canada)	Alex Adams	Adelaide Adrenaline	Knoxville Ice Bears	
(United States)	Charlie Adams	Sydney Bears	No team	
(Canada)	Dylan Anderson	Melbourne Ice	Manchester Storm	
(Canada)	Caleb Apperson	Adelaide Adrenaline	Birmingham Bulls	
(Australia)	Anthony Barnes	Sydney Bears	No team	
(Australia)	Ignacy Benjamin	Sydney Ice Dogs	No team	
(Australia)	Robert Bird	Perth Thunder	No team	
(Australia)	Mitchell Bonollo	Melbourne Ice	Saints Monarchs	
(Canada)	Channing Bresciani	CBR Brave	HC Fassa	
(Australia)	Russel Brewer	Adelaide Adrenaline	Adelaide Tigers	
(Australia)	Declan Bronte	Melbourne Ice	New Hampshire Jr. Monarchs 18U	
(Canada)	Michael Burns	Sydney Bears	No team	
(Canada)	Matt Buskas	CBR Brave	No team	
(Australia)	James Byers	CBR Brave	No team	
(Australia)	Brad Chenoweth	Adelaide Adrenaline	Adelaide Jokers	
(Australia)	Billy Cliff	Sydney Ice Dogs	No team	
(Australia)	Darren Corstens	Adelaide Adrenaline	Adelaide Blackhawks	
(United Kingdom)	Ben Davies	Melbourne Mustangs	Guildford Flames	
(Canada)	Peter Di Salvo	Perth Thunder	Quad City Storm	
(Australia)	Etienne Du Toit	Sydney Bears	No team	
(Australia)	Nickolas Eckhardt	CBR Brave	No team	
(Canada)	Brett Ferguson	Melbourne Mustangs	Guildford Flames	
(Australia)	Luke Fisher	Melbourne Mustangs	No team	
(Canada)	Nate Fleming	Melbourne Ice	No team	
(Switzerland)	Pascal Gemperli	Perth Thunder	EHC Frauenfeld	
(United States)	Trevor Gerling	CBR Brave	Huntsville Havoc	
(Australia)	Jordan Geyer	Adelaide Adrenaline	Adelaide Jokers	
(Australia)	Per Daniel Göransson	CBR Brave	No team	
(Australia)	Kaden Goulds	Perth Thunder	No team	
(Canada)	Pier-Olivier Grandmaison	Perth Thunder	Rapid City Rush	
(Australia)	Jacob Haley	Melbourne Ice	Braves IHC	
(United States)	Joe Harcharik	Newcastle Northstars	No team	
(Australia)	Joshua Healey	Perth Thunder	No team	
(Canada)	Matt Hewitt	CBR Brave	HC Fassa	
(Australia)	Michael James	Melbourne Ice	No team	
(Australia)	Zane Jones	Newcastle Northstars	Visby/Roma HK	
(Australia)	Adam Kimbley	Sydney Bears	Penrith Raptors	
(Latvia)	Nikita Kolesnikovs	Melbourne Mustangs	Roanoke Rail Yard Dawgs	
(Belgium)	Bryan Kolodziejczyk	Sydney Ice Dogs	Scorpions de Mulhouse	
(Australia)	Simon Kudla	Perth Thunder	No team	
(Canada)	Devon Krogh	Melbourne Ice	No team	
(Canada)	Dillon Lawrence	Melbourne Ice	Coventry Blaze	
(Canada)	Sam Lawson	Newcastle Northstars	Briercrest College	
(Australia)	Ilman Lee	Sydney Ice Dogs	No team	
(Australia)	Tyler Leeming	Adelaide Adrenaline	Adelaide Red Wings	
(Canada)	Chris Leveille	CBR Brave	Brampton Beast	
(Finland)	Sami Mantere	Adelaide Adrenaline	Adelaide Jokers	
(Australia)	Reggie Mattschoss	Adelaide Adrenaline	Adelaide Red Wings	
(Australia)	Mark McCann	Perth Thunder	No team	
(Australia)	Christopher McPhail	CBR Brave	No team	
(Australia)	Nicholas Mizen	Sydney Ice Dogs	Kent State University	
(Canada)	Jesse Moore	Melbourne Ice	No team	
(Australia)	Joseph Nyamuka	Melbourne Ice	No team	
(Canada)	Landon Oslanski	Perth Thunder	Lacombe Generals	
(Canada)	Adam Piett	Adelaide Adrenaline	No team	
(Finland)	Petri Pitkänen	Melbourne Mustangs	Liikunnan Riemu	
(Latvia)	Ainars Podzins	CBR Brave	LHC Les Lions	
(Australia)	Dylan Pope	Adelaide Adrenaline	Adelaide Falcons	
(Australia)	Harley Quinton-Jones	Newcastle Northstars	Newcastle North Stars ECSL	
(Australia)	Shai Rabinowitz	Sydney Bears	Marieville Red Knights	
(Canada)	Nick Rivait	Newcastle Northstars	Bulldogs Liège	
(Australia)	Fredrik Rozenberg	Sydney Bears	No team	
(Australia)	Mark Rummukainen	CBR Brave	No team	
(Sweden)	Jonatan Ruth	Sydney Ice Dogs	No team	
(Australia)	Tim Rye	Sydney Bears	Seahawks Hockey	
(Australia)	Hayden Sheard	Newcastle Northstars	No team	
(Russia)	Maxim Shneider	Melbourne Ice	No team	
(Australia)	Lachlan Shumak	Sydney Ice Dogs	No team	
(Canada)	Curtis Skip	Sydney Ice Dogs	University of Alberta-Augustana	
(Australia)	Cameron Smith	Sydney Bears	Penrith Raptors	
(United Kingdom)	Chad Smith	Sydney Bears	Fife Flyers	
(Australia)	Ethan Spelde	Newcastle Northstars	Newcastle North Stars ECSL	
(Australia)	Scott Stephenson	Sydney Ice Dogs	No team	
(Australia)	Todd Stephenson	Sydney Ice Dogs	No team	
(Australia)	Corey Stringer	Adelaide Adrenaline	No team	
(Canada)	Graeme Strukoff	Sydney Bears	No team	
(Australia)	Tynan Theobald	CBR Brave	No team	
(Australia)	Aleksi Toivonen	Melbourne Mustangs	No team	
(Canada)	Josh Velez	Melbourne Ice	Blackhawks IHC	
(Australia)	Levon Wilson	Perth Thunder	No team	
(Australia)	Marcus Wong	Melbourne Ice	No team	
(Canada)	Geordie Wudrick	Sydney Ice Dogs	EC Harzer Falken	

== Regular season ==
The regular season began on 20 April 2019 and will run through to 25 August 2019 before the top four teams advance to compete in the Goodall Cup playoff series.

=== Results ===
Home \ Away	AA	CB	MI	MM	NN	PT	SB	SI	AA	CB	MI	MM	NN	PT	SB	SI
Adelaide Adrenaline		3–6	1–3	3–8	3–10	2–4	3–4 (Note: Overtime)	1–4		2–6	6–7	3–5	2–8	1–7	3–8	3–6
CBR Brave	7–2		8–4	11–4	3–2	7–0	3–4	4–3	5–4		5–1	7–4	6–1	6–2	5–2	12–5
Melbourne Ice	6–5	3–2 (Note: Shootout)		3–4	4–6	1–8	4–5	6–7	4–2	2–7		3–2	4–3	3–7	3–6	4–6
Melbourne Mustangs	6–2	2–4	4–5		3–4	6–3	4–8	1–6	10–2	2–4	5–1		1–4	3–4	6–2	3–4
Newcastle Northstars	6–2	2–6	6–0	2–3		5–3	4–3	5–4	14–3	2–4	4–1	3–2		6–1	0–5	5–4
Perth Thunder	7–3	1–5	5–2	0–5	5–3		5–4	7–5	5–2	1–5	9–3	1–0	3–7		5–1	5–0
Sydney Bears	6–4	1–4	4–1	5–4	2–3	5–4		6–3	8–3	3–6	6–4	1–4	1–3	3–4		6–4
Sydney Ice Dogs	8–0	4–6	3–2	1–3	7–4	3–5	3–8		10–1	1–7	4–6	3–4	4–5	7–5	3–4	

Updated to match(es) played on Completed. Source: AIHL
Legend: Blue = home team win; Yellow = draw; Red = away team win.

=== Fixtures ===
==== April ====
Date	Time	Away	Score	Home	Location	Recap
20 April	16:45	Sydney Bears	8–3	Sydney Ice Dogs	Macquarie Ice Rink	
20 April	17:00	Adelaide Adrenaline	2–6	Melbourne Mustangs	O'Brien Icehouse	
21 April	16:00	Adelaide Adrenaline	5–6	Melbourne Ice	O'Brien Icehouse	
21 April	17:00	CBR Brave	4–1	Sydney Bears	Macquarie Ice Rink	
27 April	16:30	CBR Brave	6–3	Adelaide Adrenaline	Adelaide Ice Arena	
27 April	16:30	Melbourne Mustangs	5–0	Perth Thunder	Perth Ice Arena	
27 April	16:45	Melbourne Ice	2–3	Sydney Ice Dogs	Macquarie Ice Rink	
27 April	17:00	Sydney Bears	3–4	Newcastle Northstars	Hunter Ice Skating Stadium	
28 April	16:00	Melbourne Ice	0–6	Newcastle Northstars	Hunter Ice Skating Stadium	
28 April	16:30	CBR Brave	6–2	Adelaide Adrenaline	Adelaide Ice Arena	
28 April	16:30	Melbourne Mustangs	0–1 (SO)	Perth Thunder	Perth Ice Arena	

==== May ====
Date	Time	Away	Score	Home	Location	Recap
4 May	17:00	Adelaide Adrenaline	0–8	Sydney Ice Dogs	Macquarie Ice Rink	
4 May	17:00	Perth Thunder	3–5	Newcastle Northstars	Hunter Ice Skating Stadium	
4 May	17:30	Sydney Bears	4–3	CBR Brave	Phillip Ice Skating Centre	
5 May	16:00	Adelaide Adrenaline	2–6	Newcastle Northstars	Hunter Ice Skating Stadium	
5 May	17:00	Perth Thunder	5–3	Sydney Ice Dogs	Macquarie Ice Rink	
10 May	17:30	Melbourne Mustangs	4–3	Melbourne Ice	O'Brien Icehouse	
11 May	16:30	Newcastle Northstars	10–3	Adelaide Adrenaline	Adelaide Ice Arena	
11 May	16:30	CBR Brave	5–1	Perth Thunder	Perth Ice Arena	
11 May	17:00	Sydney Ice Dogs	4–3 (SO)	Melbourne Mustangs	O'Brien Icehouse	
12 May	14:00	Sydney Ice Dogs	7–6	Melbourne Ice	O'Brien Icehouse	
12 May	16:30	Newcastle Northstars	8–2	Adelaide Adrenaline	Adelaide Ice Arena	
12 May	16:30	CBR Brave	5–1	Perth Thunder	Perth Ice Arena	
18 May	17:00	Melbourne Mustangs	4–5	Sydney Bears	Macquarie Ice Rink	
18 May	17:00	Melbourne Ice	1–4	Newcastle Northstars	Hunter Ice Skating Stadium	
18 May	17:30	Sydney Ice Dogs	3–4	CBR Brave	Phillip Ice Skating Centre	
19 May	16:00	Melbourne Mustangs	3–2	Newcastle Northstars	Hunter Ice Skating Stadium	
19 May	17:00	Melbourne Ice	1–4	Sydney Bears	Macquarie Ice Rink	
25 May	16:30	Sydney Bears	4–3 (OT)	Adelaide Adrenaline	Adelaide Ice Arena	
25 May	17:00	CBR Brave	6–4	Sydney Ice Dogs	Macquarie Ice Rink	
25 May	17:00	Newcastle Northstars	4–3	Melbourne Mustangs	O'Brien Icehouse	
26 May	14:00	Newcastle Northstars	6–4	Melbourne Ice	O'Brien Icehouse	
26 May	16:30	Sydney Bears	4–5	Perth Thunder	Perth Ice Arena	
31 May	17:30	Melbourne Ice	5–4 (SO)	Melbourne Mustangs	O'Brien Icehouse	

==== June ====
Date	Time	Away	Score	Home	Location	Recap
1 June	17:00	Sydney Ice Dogs	3–6	Sydney Bears	Macquarie Ice Rink	
1 June	17:00	Adelaide Adrenaline	2–4	Melbourne Ice	O'Brien Icehouse	
1 June	17:30	Perth Thunder	0–7	CBR Brave	Phillip Ice Skating Centre	
2 June	14:00	Adelaide Adrenaline	2–10	Melbourne Mustangs	O'Brien Icehouse	
2 June	16:30	Perth Thunder	2–6	CBR Brave	Phillip Ice Skating Centre	
2 June	17:00	Newcastle Northstars	3–2	Sydney Bears	Macquarie Ice Rink	
8 June	16:30	Melbourne Ice	2–5	Perth Thunder	Perth Ice Arena	
8 June	17:30	Sydney Bears	2–5	CBR Brave	Phillip Ice Skating Centre	
9 June	16:00	Sydney Ice Dogs	4–5	Newcastle Northstars	Hunter Ice Skating Stadium	
9 June	16:30	Melbourne Mustangs	4–11	CBR Brave	Phillip Ice Skating Centre	
9 June	16:30	Melbourne Ice	3–1	Adelaide Adrenaline	Adelaide Ice Arena	
22 June	16:30	Sydney Ice Dogs	4–1	Adelaide Adrenaline	Adelaide Ice Arena	
22 June	17:00	Perth Thunder	4–5 (OT)	Sydney Bears	Macquarie Ice Rink	
22 June	17:00	Melbourne Mustangs	2–3	Melbourne Ice	O'Brien Icehouse	
22 June	17:00	CBR Brave	6–2	Newcastle Northstars	Hunter Ice Skating Stadium	
23 June	16:00	Perth Thunder	1–6	Newcastle Northstars	Hunter Ice Skating Stadium	
23 June	16:30	Sydney Ice Dogs	6–3	Adelaide Adrenaline	Adelaide Ice Arena	
23 June	17:00	CBR Brave	6–3	Sydney Bears	Macquarie Ice Rink	
29 June	16:30	Adelaide Adrenaline	3–7	Perth Thunder	Perth Ice Arena	
29 June	17:00	Melbourne Ice	4–6	Sydney Bears	Macquarie Ice Rink	
29 June	17:00	CBR Brave	4–2	Melbourne Mustangs	O'Brien Icehouse	
29 June	17:00	Sydney Ice Dogs	4–5 (OT)	Newcastle Northstars	Hunter Ice Skating Stadium	
30 June	14:00	CBR Brave	4–2	Melbourne Mustangs	O'Brien Icehouse	
30 June	16:30	Adelaide Adrenaline	2–5	Perth Thunder	Perth Ice Arena	
30 June	16:45	Melbourne Ice	6–4	Sydney Ice Dogs	Macquarie Ice Rink	

==== July ====
Date	Time	Away	Score	Home	Location	Recap
6 July	16:30	Perth Thunder	4–2	Adelaide Adrenaline	Adelaide Ice Arena	
6 July	17:00	Sydney Ice Dogs	4–6	Sydney Bears	Macquarie Ice Rink	
6 July	17:00	Newcastle Northstars	3–4	Melbourne Ice	O'Brien Icehouse	
7 July	14:00	Newcastle Northstars	4–1	Melbourne Mustangs	O'Brien Icehouse	
7 July	16:30	Perth Thunder	7–1	Adelaide Adrenaline	Adelaide Ice Arena	
7 July	16:45	CBR Brave	7–1	Sydney Ice Dogs	Macquarie Ice Rink	
12 July	19:30	Newcastle Northstars	3–1	Sydney Bears	Macquarie Ice Rink	
13 July	17:00	Perth Thunder	3–6	Melbourne Mustangs	O'Brien Icehouse	
13 July	17:30	Melbourne Ice	4–8	CBR Brave	Phillip Ice Skating Centre	
13 July	17:30	Adelaide Adrenaline	1–10	Sydney Ice Dogs	Macquarie Ice Rink	
14 July	14:00	Perth Thunder	4–3	Melbourne Mustangs	O'Brien Icehouse	
14 July	16:30	Melbourne Ice	1–5	CBR Brave	Phillip Ice Skating Centre	
14 July	17:00	Adelaide Adrenaline	4–6	Sydney Bears	Macquarie Ice Rink	
19 July	19:30	Melbourne Ice	1–5	Melbourne Mustangs	O'Brien Icehouse	
20 July	16:30	Sydney Ice Dogs	5–7	Perth Thunder	Perth Ice Arena	
20 July	17:00	Sydney Bears	5–4	Melbourne Ice	O'Brien Icehouse	
20 July	17:30	Newcastle Northstars	2–3	CBR Brave	Phillip Ice Skating Centre	
21 July	14:00	Sydney Bears	8–4	Melbourne Mustangs	O'Brien Icehouse	
21 July	16:00	CBR Brave	4–2	Newcastle Northstars	Hunter Ice Skating Stadium	
21 July	16:30	Sydney Ice Dogs	0–5	Perth Thunder	Perth Ice Arena	
26 July	19:30	Newcastle Northstars	4–7	Sydney Ice Dogs	Macquarie Ice Rink	
27 July	16:30	Melbourne Mustangs	8–3	Adelaide Adrenaline	Adelaide Ice Arena	
27 July	17:00	CBR Brave	2–3 (SO)	Melbourne Ice	O'Brien Icehouse	
27 July	17:00	Perth Thunder	5–7	Sydney Ice Dogs	Macquarie Ice Rink	
27 July	17:00	Sydney Bears	5–0	Newcastle Northstars	Hunter Ice Skating Stadium	
28 July	14:00	CBR Brave	7–2	Melbourne Ice	O'Brien Icehouse	
28 July	16:30	Melbourne Mustangs	5–3	Adelaide Adrenaline	Adelaide Ice Arena	
28 July	17:00	Perth Thunder	4–3	Sydney Bears	Macquarie Ice Rink	

==== August ====
Date	Time	Away	Score	Home	Location	Recap
3 August	16:30	Newcastle Northstars	3–5	Perth Thunder	Perth Ice Arena	
3 August	17:00	Sydney Bears	6–3	Melbourne Ice	O'Brien Icehouse	
3 August	17:00	Melbourne Mustangs	3–1	Sydney Ice Dogs	Macquarie Ice Rink	
3 August	17:30	Adelaide Adrenaline	2–7	CBR Brave	Phillip Ice Skating Centre	
4 August	14:00	Sydney Bears	2–6	Melbourne Mustangs	O'Brien Icehouse	
4 August	16:30	Adelaide Adrenaline	4–5	CBR Brave	Phillip Ice Skating Centre	
4 August	16:30	Newcastle Northstars	7–3	Perth Thunder	Perth Ice Arena	
10 August	16:30	Melbourne Ice	7–6 (OT)	Adelaide Adrenaline	Adelaide Ice Arena	
10 August	17:00	Melbourne Mustangs	4–1	Sydney Bears	Macquarie Ice Rink	
10 August	17:30	Sydney Ice Dogs	5–12	CBR Brave	Phillip Ice Skating Centre	
11 August	16:30	Melbourne Ice	3–9	Perth Thunder	Perth Ice Arena	
11 August	16:30	Melbourne Mustangs	4–7	CBR Brave	Phillip Ice Skating Centre	
11 August	16:45	Newcastle Northstars	5–4 (SO)	Sydney Ice Dogs	Macquarie Ice Rink	
17 August	16:30	Sydney Bears	1–5	Perth Thunder	Perth Ice Arena	
17 August	17:00	Sydney Ice Dogs	6–4	Melbourne Ice	O'Brien Icehouse	
17 August	17:30	Newcastle Northstars	1–6	CBR Brave	Phillip Ice Skating Centre	
18 August	14:00	Sydney Ice Dogs	6–1	Melbourne Mustangs	O'Brien Icehouse	
18 August	16:30	Sydney Bears	8–3	Adelaide Adrenaline	Adelaide Ice Arena	
23 August	19:30	Sydney Bears	4–3	Sydney Ice Dogs	Macquarie Ice Rink	
24 August	17:00	Adelaide Adrenaline	3–8	Sydney Bears	Macquarie Ice Rink	
24 August	17:00	Perth Thunder	8–1	Melbourne Ice	O'Brien Icehouse	
24 August	17:00	Melbourne Mustangs	2–3 (OT)	Newcastle Northstars	Hunter Ice Skating Stadium	
25 August	14:00	Perth Thunder	7–3	Melbourne Ice	O'Brien Icehouse	
25 August	16:00	Adelaide Adrenaline	3–14	Newcastle Northstars	Hunter Ice Skating Stadium	
25 August	16:45	Melbourne Mustangs	4–3 (OT)	Sydney Ice Dogs	Macquarie Ice Rink	

=== Standings ===
Team	GP	W	OTW	OTL	L	GF	GA	GDF	PTS
CBR Brave	28	26	0	1	1	161	67	+94	79
Newcastle Northstars	28	16	3	0	9	127	89	+38	54
Perth Thunder	28	16	1	1	10	116	103	+13	51
Sydney Bears	28	15	2	0	11	121	102	+19	49
Melbourne Mustangs	28	12	1	4	11	108	99	+9	42
Sydney Ice Dogs	28	10	1	3	14	122	128	–6	35
Melbourne Ice	28	6	3	0	19	90	140	–50	24
Adelaide Adrenaline	28	0	0	2	26	71	188	–117	2

Qualified for the Goodall Cup playoffs	H Newman Reid Trophy winners

=== Skater statistics ===
2019 AIHL season top-ten lists for the following four skater statistical categories: Points, Goals, Assists and Penalty minutes.

Points
#	Name	Team	Pos	Pts
1	(United Kingdom) Tim Crowder	SD	F	77
2	(Canada) Jesse Gabrielle	CB	F	67
3	(Canada) Sammy Banga	NN	F	66
4	(Canada) Dylan Quaile	SD	D	63
5	(Canada) Louick Marcotte	PT	F	62
6	(Canada) Francis Drolet	NN	F	54
7	(Australia) Wehebe Darge	CB	F	54
8	(Canada) Danick Gauthier	SB	F	53
9	(Canada) Keven Veilleux	PT	F	52
10	(United Kingdom) Paul Crowder	SD	F	52

Goals
#	Name	Team	Pos	G
1	(Canada) Jesse Gabrielle	CB	F	39
2	(United Kingdom) Tim Crowder	SD	F	36
3	(Canada) Sammy Banga	NN	F	25
4	(Canada) Dylan Quaile	SD	D	23
5	(Canada) Louick Marcotte	PT	F	22
6	(Canada) Danick Gauthier	SB	F	22
7	(Canada) Keven Veilleux	PT	F	22
8	(Australia) Kieran Webster	PT	F	21
9	(Canada) Francis Drolet	NN	F	20
10	(New Zealand) Jacob Ratcliffe	SB	F	20

Assists
#	Name	Team	Pos	A
1	(United Kingdom) Tim Crowder	SD	F	41
2	(Canada) Sammy Banga	NN	F	41
3	(Canada) Dylan Quaile	SD	D	40
4	(Canada) Louick Marcotte	PT	F	40
5	(United Kingdom) Paul Crowder	SD	F	36
6	(Australia) Wehebe Darge	CB	F	35
7	(Canada) Francis Drolet	NN	F	34
8	(Canada) Danick Gauthier	SB	F	31
9	(Canada) Keven Veilleux	PT	F	30
10	(Canada) Grant Toulmin	SD	F	30

Penalty minutes
#	Name	Team	Pos	PIM
1	(Canada) Kyle Neuber	AA	F	146
2	(Canada) Keven Veilleux	PT	F	112
3	(Australia) Tyerell Clare	SB	D	95
4	(Canada) Alex Gauthier	AA	D	94
5	(Canada) Louick Marcotte	PT	F	91
6	(New Zealand) Jermaine Joyce	MI	D	74
7	(Australia) Hayden Dawes	CB	D	69
8	(Australia) Darcy Flanagan	MI	D	69
9	(Canada) Parker Thomas	MM	F	68
10	(Australia) Alec Stephenson	SD	F	68

=== Goaltender statistics ===
2019 AIHL season top-ten lists for the following two goaltender statistical categories: Goals against average and Save percentage

Goals against average
#	Name	Team	Pos	GAA
1	(Canada) Matt Climie	CB	G	2.14
2	(Australia) Alex Tetreault	CB	G	2.87
3	(New Zealand) Jaden Pine-Murphy	MM	G	2.92
4	(Canada) Dayne Davis	NN	G	3.04
5	(Canada) Kevin Nastiuk	MM	G	3.24
6	(Australia) Anthony Kimlin	SB	G	3.60
7	(Finland) Nico Vikstén	PT	G	3.62
8	(Sweden) Seb Andersson	MI	G	3.87
9	(United States) Garrett Bartus	SD	G	4.33
10	(Canada) Jesse Gordichuk	AA	G	6.06

Save percentage
#	Name	Team	Pos	SVS%
1	(Canada) Matt Climie	CB	G	.914%
2	(Canada) Dayne Davis	NN	G	.900%
3	(Finland) Nico Vikstén	PT	G	.894%
4	(Australia) Anthony Kimlin	SB	G	.893%
5	(Australia) Alex Tetreault	CB	G	.889%
6	(Sweden) Seb Andersson	MI	G	.887%
7	(New Zealand) Jaden Pine-Murphy	MM	G	.886%
8	(United States) Garrett Bartus	SD	G	.869%
9	(Canada) Jesse Gordichuk	AA	G	.869%
10	(Canada) Kevin Nastiuk	MM	G	.860%

=== Season awards ===
Below lists the 2019 AIHL regular season award winners.

Award	Name	Team
MVP	(Canada) Dylan Quaile	Sydney Ice Dogs
Goaltender	(Canada) Matt Climie	CBR Brave
Defenceman	(Canada) Dylan Quaile	Sydney Ice Dogs
Rookie	(New Zealand) Jake Ratcliffe	Sydney Bears
Local player	(Australia) Kieran Webster	Perth Thunder
Coach	(Australia) John Kennedy	Newcastle Northstars

== Goodall Cup playoffs ==
The 2019 playoffs are scheduled to begin on 31 August with the Goodall Cup final held on 1 September. Following the end of the regular season the top four teams advance to the playoff series which is to be held at the Hunter Ice Skating Stadium in Newcastle, New South Wales. The series is a single game elimination with the two winning semi-finalists advancing to the Goodall Cup final.

Semi-finals
1	CBR Brave	4
4	Sydney Bears	6
3	Perth Thunder	3
2	Newcastle Northstars	2

Final
Sydney Bears	5
Perth Thunder	2

All times are UTC+10:00

=== Semi-finals ===
31 August 2019; 15:00	Sydney Bears	6–4 (0–1, 2–3, 4–0)	CBR Brave	Hunter Ice Skating Stadium

Game reference

Anthony Kimlin
Goalies
Matthew Climie
Referees:
Kent Unwin
Cory Ross
Linesmen:
Dan Boyd
Casper Russelhuber

	0 – 1	6:58 – Hughes (Gabrielle, Riley)
15:30 – Gauthier (Annesley)	1 – 1
	1 – 2	17:31 – Gabrielle (Camenzind, Hughes)
	1 – 3	27:24 – Darge (C.Kubara, Kambeitz)
28:33 – Dauda (Annesley, Ratcliffe)	2 – 3
	2 – 4	29:57 – B. Kubara (Dawes)
31:22 – Brücker (Newmark, Schlamp)	3 – 4
36:01 – Annesley (Gauthier)	4 – 4
46:57 – Gauthier (Schlamp, Clare)	5 – 4
49:57 – Ratcliffe (Rubes)	6 – 4

10 min
Penalties
14 min
40
Shots
30

31 August 2019; 19:00	Perth Thunder	3–2 (1–1, 1–0, 1–1)	Newcastle Northstars	Hunter Ice Skating Stadium

Game reference

Nico Viksten
Goalies
Dayne Davis
Referees:
Jeff Scott
Chris Parks
Linesmen:
Mark Peruzzo
David Rehak

	0 – 1	00:57 – Tesarik (Banga, Drolet)
03:21 – Breault (SH) (Haselhurst, Marcotte)	1 – 1
20:20 – Tobin (Cox)	2 – 1
45:19 – Breault (Viksten)	3 – 1
	3 – 2	47:08 – Tesarik (Banga, Malloy)

4 min
Penalties
6 min
34
Shots
27

=== Final ===
1 September 2019; 15:30	Sydney Bears	5–2 (2–2, 2–0, 1–0)	Perth Thunder	Hunter Ice Skating Stadium

Game reference

Anthony Kimlin
Goalies
Nico Viksten
Referees:
Jeff Scott
Chris Parks
Linesmen:
Dan Boyd
David Rehak

	0 – 1	5:02 – Marcotte (Kudla, Webster)
	0 – 2	7:16 – Webster (Veilleux, Marcotte)
14:42 – Dauda (PP) (Gauthier, Annesley)	1 – 2
14:54 – Ratcliffe (PP) (Dauda, Schlamp)	2 – 2
20:22 – Dauda (Unassisted)	3 – 2
21:09 – Brücker (Schlamp, Clare)	4 – 2
49:46 – Dauda (Annesley)	5 – 2

6 min
Penalties
4 min
27
Shots
28

== All-Star weekend ==
The 2019 AIHL All-Star Weekend was held at the International Convention Centre Sydney on 14 and 15 June 2019. The format of the weekend is unchanged from 2018 with a skills competition on 14 June and an all-stars game on 15 June. The teams however were re-aligned on a north–south basis. Team North included players from the CBR Brave, Newcastle Northstars, Sydney Bears and Sydney Ice Dogs. Team South included players from the Adelaide Adrenaline, Melbourne Ice, Melbourne Mustangs and Perth Thunder. Sydney Bears' Michael Schlamp and Perth Thunder's Jamie Woodman were initially announced as the team captains for Team North and Team South respectively. Schlamp was later replaced by Brian Funes of the Sydney Bears due to injury. The Sydney Bears' Ron Kuprowsky was named as Team North coach and Perth Thunder's David Ruck as coach of Team South. The weekend ran alongside the 2019 Ice Hockey Classic, an exhibition series featuring players from Canada and the United States.

The skills competition, originally organised for Friday 14 June was cancelled along with the Ice Hockey Classic match between the United States and Canada. As such, a cut down version of the skills competition involving just two of the originally planned events was contested on Saturday 15 June before the start of the 2019 All-Stars match. Jesse Gabrielle of the CBR Brave won the fastest skater competition. Danick Gauthier of the Sydney Bears won the hardest shot competition. Team North defeated Team South 11–9 in the All-Stars match and Perth Thunder's Keven Veilleux claimed the Mick McCormack Cup after being named the most valuable player.

=== Skills competition ===
- Fastest Skater: Jesse Gabrielle (CBR Brave) - 12.97 seconds
- Hardest Shot: Danick Gauthier (Sydney Bears)

=== All-star game ===
15 June 2019; 15:30	Team North	11–9 (6–1, 0–4, 5–4)	Team South	International Convention Centre Sydney

Game reference

Anthony Kimlin
Alex Tetreault
Goalies
Nico Viksten
Jessie Gordichuck

4:23 – Gabrielle (Dawes, Draper)	1 – 0
5:25 – A. Gauthier (OG)	2 – 0
5:45 – Banga (Funes, Steven)	3 – 0
	3 – 1	5:52 – Isackson (Rezek, Kulczycki)
9:00 – Steven (Drolet, Banga)	4 – 1
10:43 – Dawes (Draper)	5 – 1
12:09 – P. Crowder (D.Gauthier, T.Crowder)	6 – 1
	6 – 2	19:18 – Veilleux (Boyle)
	6 – 3	22:36 – Rezek (A.Gauthier, Boyle)
	6 – 4	23:54 – Virjassov (Isackson)
	6 – 5	28:24 – Veilleux (Rezek)
	6 – 6	33:05 – Kulczycki (Schwartz, Haselhurst)
35:24 – D. Gauthier (T.Crowder)	7 – 6
35:55 – Marino (Banga, Drolet)	8 – 6
37:50 – Gabrielle (Carini)	9 – 6
	9 – 7	39:01 – Isackson (Virjassov)
	9 – 8	41:21 – Rezek (Veilleux, Webster)
41:48 – Draper (Dawes)	10 – 8
48:47 – Quaile (ON) (unassisted)	11 – 8
	11 – 9	49:20 – Lazzarotto (Kulczycki, Schwartz)

0 min
Penalties
0 min
