= Icehouse (arena) =

Public ice rink in Victoria, Australia

The Icehouse
- O'Brien Icehouse

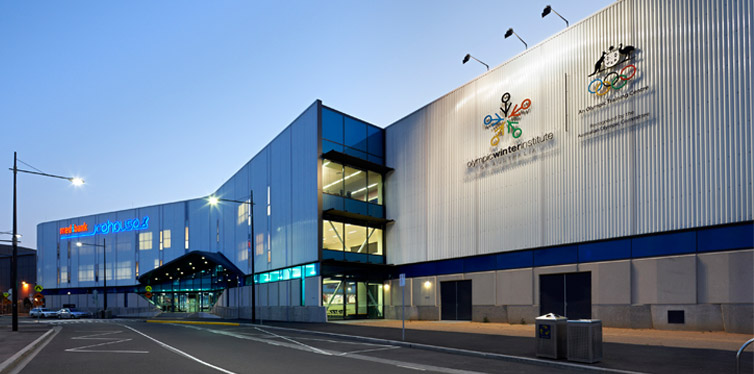
- Interactive map of The Icehouse
- Former names: National Ice Sports Centre; Medibank Icehouse (2010–2015); O'Brien Group Arena (2016–2018)
- Location: 105 Pearl River Road, Docklands, Melbourne, 3008
- Coordinates: 37.8123777°S 144.9355674°E
- Capacity: 1,500 (seating)
- Surface: 61 by 30 metres (200 by 98 feet) with a corner radius of 4.2 metres (14 feet)

Construction
- Opened: 12 February 2010 (15 years ago)

Tenants
- Olympic Winter Institute of Australia (2010–present); Australia men's national ice hockey team (2010–present); Melbourne Ice (Women) (2010–present); Melbourne Ice (2010–present); Melbourne Mustangs (2010–present).

Website
- obrienicehouse.com.au

The Icehouse (also currently known as O'Brien Icehouse due to naming rights) is an Australian ice sports and entertainment centre, located in the Docklands precinct of Melbourne, in Victoria, Australia.

== Facilities ==
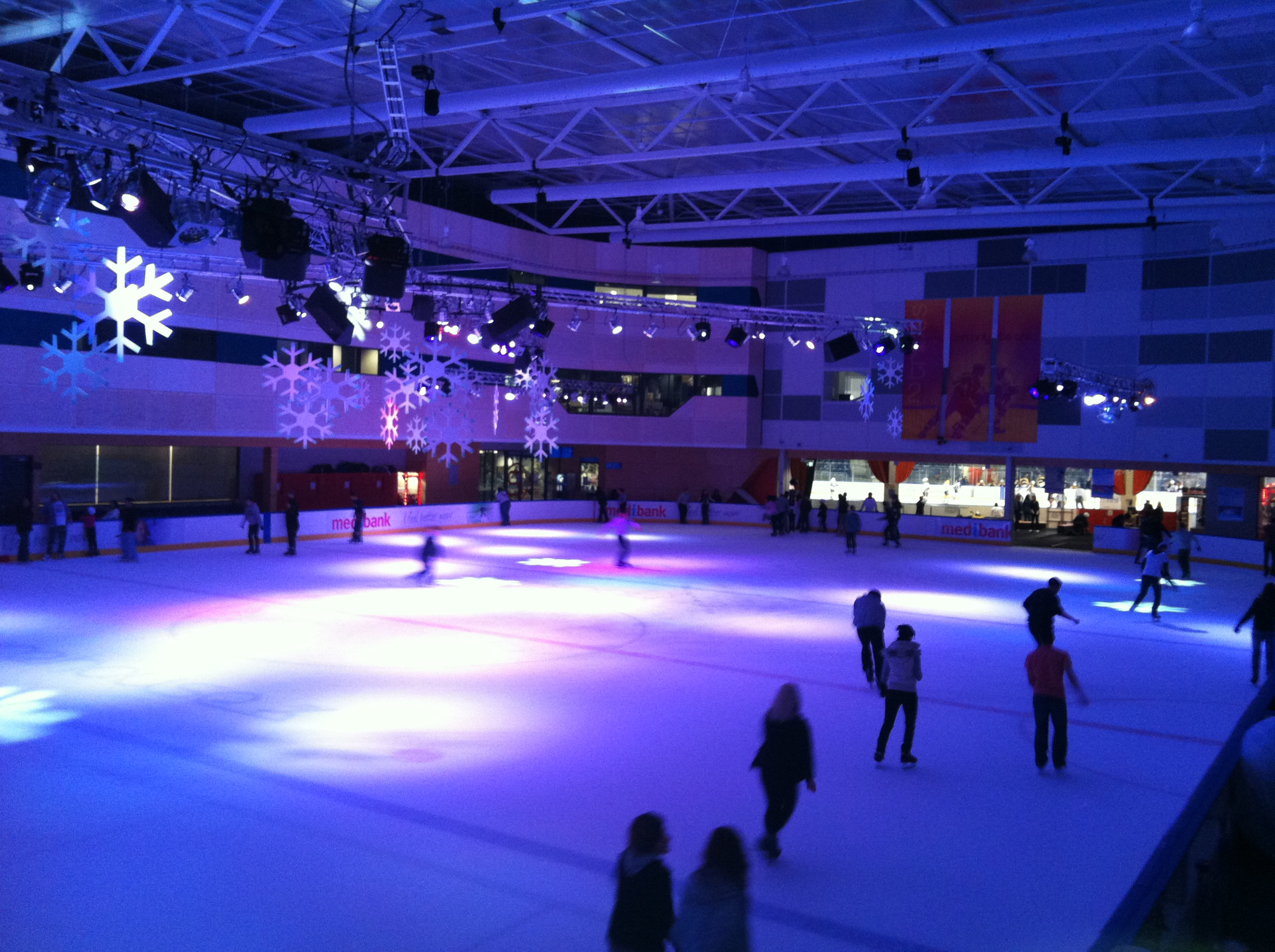
The Bradbury Rink is open to public skating every day of the week. It is also used for figure skating and curling.

During construction of the Icehouse, it was known as the National Ice Sports Centre. Home of the Olympic Winter Institute of Australia, it contains two Olympic-sized ice rinks and a specialist winter sports gym. Rink 1, which features stadium seating and fully glassed boards suitable for ice hockey, is known as the Henke Rink, named in honour of Australian ice sports champion Geoffrey Henke AO. Rink 2, used mostly for public skating, is named the Bradbury Rink, after the Bradbury family – the most well-known member, Steven Bradbury, was a short-track speedskater who won the 1,000m gold medal at the 2002 Winter Olympics, and his father John along with brother Warren were both also heavily involved in ice sports.

The rink is home to both Victorian-based ice hockey teams competing in the Australian Ice Hockey League, the Melbourne Ice and Melbourne Mustangs. The Icehouse has a capacity of 1,500 people and its facilities include a pro shop, The St Moritz Bar, and the Igloo Café.

3 April 2019, the O’Brien Group announced the completion of upgrades to their Melbourne stadium including 1,361 solar panels, two 80,000-litre water tanks, and an environmentally-friendly heating system. The new facilities would generate 400 kW of power, providing a 25% savings on the stadium's power bill. To mark the completion of the new upgrades the stadium was renamed from O’Brien Group Arena to O’Brien Icehouse, invoking and recognising the stadium's original name.

== Events ==
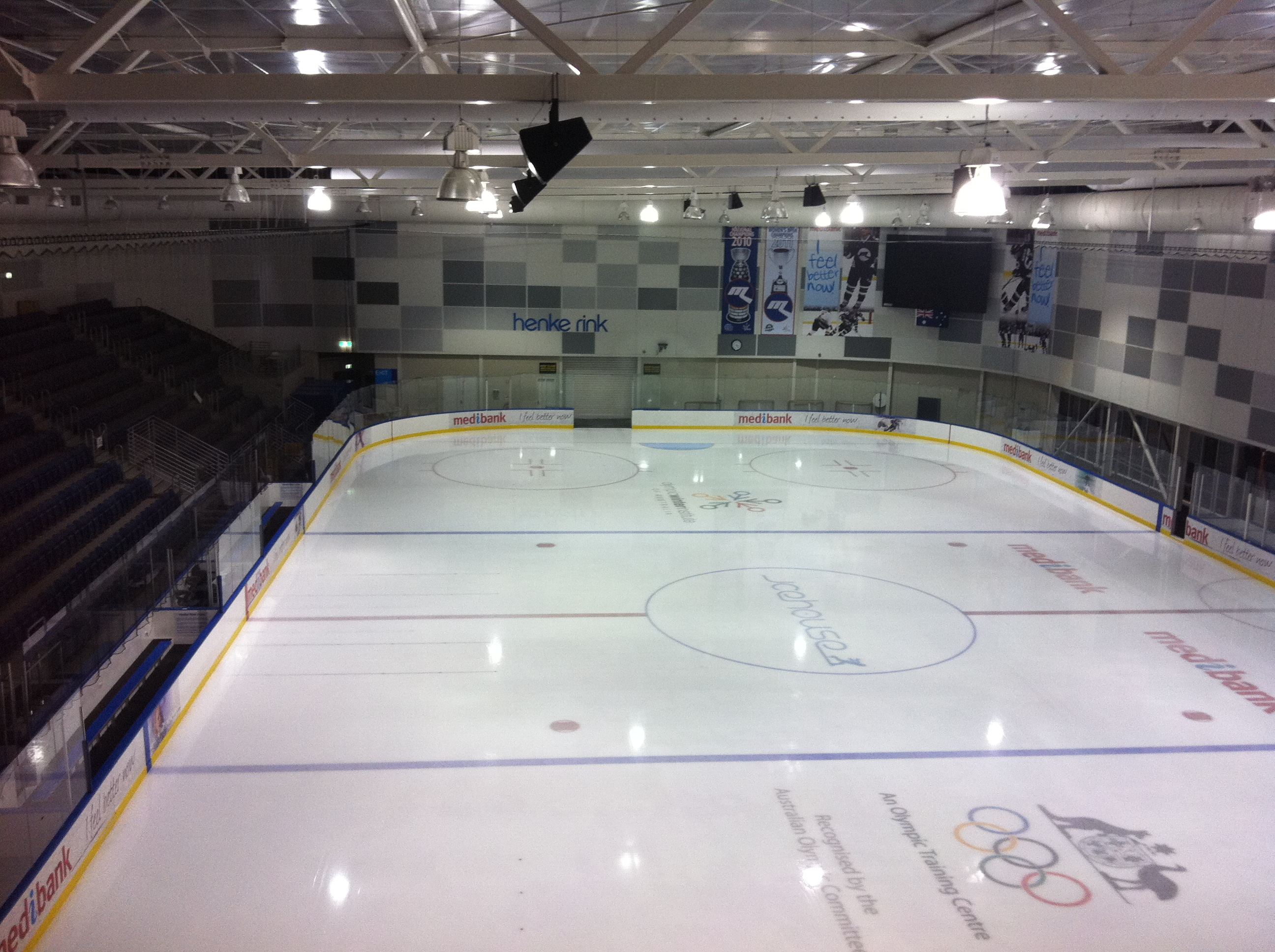
The Henke Rink is used year-round for Ice Hockey and Speed Skating.

Since opening in February 2010, the Icehouse has played host to many events. As well as hosting all home games of Melbourne Ice and Melbourne Mustangs in the AIHL (Australian Ice Hockey League), it also held the 2010, 2011, 2013, 2014, 2015, 2017 and 2018 AIHL Goodall Cup finals weekends. Both Melbourne AIHL teams have won the Goodall Cup at the Icehouse.

In April 2011 the Icehouse hosted the 2011 IIHF World Championship Division II. Team Australia won the championship playing against Belgium, Mexico, New Zealand, and Serbia.

Other events that have been held here include the 2010 Australian Figure Skating Championships, National Speed Skating Championships, Victorian Figure Skating Championships and an annual Christmas Show.

In February 2012 the Henke Rink was transformed from a hockey rink to a world-class short track rink that hosted the 2012 World Junior Short Track Speed Skating Championships. This saw skaters aged 19 years and under traveling from over 30 countries to compete in the 500 meters, 1000 meters, 1500 meters, 1500 meters super final, and a team effort in the 3000 meters relay. Three junior world records were broken during this event.

== Location ==
It is located at 105 Pearl River Road, near The District Docklands, in the Docklands precinct of Melbourne, in Victoria, Australia.

The closest public transport to the Icehouse is the Melbourne tram network, operated by Public Transport Victoria. The Waterfront City tram stop, located on Docklands Drive, is the closest to the venue and is serviced by the number 35 (City Circle), 70 (Wattle Park) and 86 (Bundoora RMIT) trams.

== See also ==
- List of ice rinks in Australia
- Sport in Victoria
