= Melbourne Ice =

- City: Melbourne, Victoria
- League: Australian Ice Hockey League
- Conference: Hellyer Conference
- Founded: 2000 (26 years ago)
- Operated: 2002–present
- Home arena: O'Brien Icehouse
- Colours: Navy blue, crimson red, white
- Owner: Peter Hartshorne
- General manager: (Australia) Mark Smith
- Head coach: Vacant
- Captain: (Australia) Mac Caruana
- Affiliates: Melbourne Ice (AWIHL); Melbourne Glaciers (AJIHL)
- Farm club: Melbourne Ice Wolves
- Website: melbourneice.hockey

Championships
- Conference titles: 1 (2012)
- H Newman Reid Trophies: 5 (2006, 2011, 2016, 2017, 2025)
- Goodall Cups: 5 (2010, 2011, 2012, 2017, 2025)
- Trans-Tasman Champions League: 1 (2012)

The Melbourne Ice is an Australian ice hockey team from Melbourne, Victoria, based at the Icehouse in the Docklands precinct of central Melbourne. Founded in 2000, the Ice have been a member of the semi-professional league, Australian Ice Hockey League (AIHL) since 2002, and are five-time Goodall Cup champions and H Newman Reid Trophy premiers.

== History ==
=== Foundation ===
The Melbourne Ice was established in 2000 by Mark Weber after the initial three AIHL teams asked Weber to start a team in Melbourne. The Ice spent two years playing exhibition matches and researching prospects at the Olympic Ice Skating Centre in Oakleigh South. Weber was named foundation chairman and president when the Ice were accepted into the AIHL in April 2002. The Ice joined the Australian Ice Hockey League as part of a three-team expansion of the league, along with Newcastle North Stars and Western Sydney Ice Dogs.

=== Oakleigh era ===
Original Melbourne Ice logo used when the team was located at Olympic Ice Skating Centre, Oakleigh between 2002 and 2009

During the first two seasons the Ice play home matches at Oakleigh with occasional matches played in Bendigo. The Melbourne Ice appointed long time Demons IHC Victorian coach Rod Johns as inaugural head coach. Glenn Grandy and Jon Moses formed the first Ice leadership team as duel captains.

The Melbourne Ice's first ever AIHL match was played on 4 May 2002. The Ice played Adelaide Avalanche at home at Olympic Ice Rink, Oakleigh. The match was tough with a combined total of 77 penalty minutes. The Ice outshot the Avalanche 31 to 25 with Greg Sturrock scoring the Ice's first ever AIHL goal, assisted by Ross Howell and Jon Moses. Vinnie Hughes scored the Ice's second goal but it proved to be a consolation goal as Adelaide defeated the Ice 5–2. The Ice finished their first AIHL season in last place in the league standings with two wins and fourteen losses.

In 2003, the Ice appointed Sandy Gardner has head coach, replacing Rod Johns. In 2004, the Ice stopped scheduling matches in Bendigo and exclusively played out of the Olympic Centre in Oakleigh and Canadian Mike Mazzuca became the captain of the team. The Melbourne Ice failed to reach the AIHL finals in their first four seasons, consistently finishing fifth or sixth in the standings at the end of the regular season. The 2006 season was a turnaround season for the Melbourne Ice. Roy Sargent and Brad Vigon continued as the coach and captain leadership team from 2005. Josh Puls was elected club president. It was the first season the Ice won more matches than they lost in the AIHL, winning 21 times from 28 matches. It was the first time they reached top of the table during the season in May. It was the first season they finished inside the top four in the league standings and qualified for the AIHL finals. And it was the first time they won a title and trophy. Finishing top of the league ladder to be named Premiers and win the V.I.P. Cup. The Ice's first finals campaign was held in Adelaide at the IceArenA. On Saturday 2 September 2006, the Melbourne Ice took on the Newcastle North Stars in the AIHL semi-finals. The Ice went behind 0–2 in the first period thanks to a pair of power play goals to league top point scorer, Marcel Kars. Lliam Webster scored the Ice's first finals goal to bring the match back to one goal separation but the North Stars broke away from that point and punished the Ice's poor discipline on the power play with a further four power play goals in the second and third periods. By the end of the match the Ice had been defeated 1–6 by the Northstars who had scored all six of their goals with the man advantage.

First Melbourne Ice roster from Round One 2002
Goaltenders
(Australia) #1 Stuart Denman		(Australia) #20 Roland Weber
Defencemen
(Australia) #2 Peter Matus	(Australia) #3 Jon Moses (C)	(Australia) #4 David Wood	(Australia) #9 Grove Bennett
(Australia) #12 Rick Keyser	(Australia) #14 Drew Carfrae	(Australia) #16 Glen Grandy (C)
Forwards
(Australia) #5 Darren Croft	(Australia) #6 Jody Cavers	(Australia) #7 Vinnie Hughes	(Australia) #8 Brad Smith
(Australia) #10 Ross Howell	(Australia) #11 Daniel Gunn	(Australia) #12 Erin Geraghty	(Poland) #13 Joseph Nyamuka
(Australia) #15 Lachie Craven	(Australia) #17 Lliam Webster	(Australia) #18 Greg Sturrock	(Australia) #19 Nigel Chandler
Coaching staff
(Canada) Rod Johns (Head coach)	(Australia) Ian Carfrae (Trainer)	(Australia) Stephanie Langer (Medic)	(Australia) Grove Bennett (Manager)

Between 2007 and 2009 the Melbourne Ice consistently finished in the top three positions in the league standings. The Ice also consistently lost their semi-final match-ups in the finals. Losing 3–6 to the North Stars in 2007, 1–2 in overtime to the Western Sydney Ice Dogs in 2008 and 1–6 to the Adelaide Adrenaline in 2009. Tommy Powell was named AIHL MVP in 2007 followed up by Lliam Webster in 2008. Doug 'Bubba' Ferguson captained the team for two years before Lliam Webster was appointed in 2009. The Ice also adopted their first mission statement in 2009.

=== Docklands era ===
In 2010, the Melbourne Ice moved from Oakleigh to Docklands, Victoria. The Ice moved into the newly completed Melbourne Icehouse. The Icehouse was Australia's first twin-sheet ice arena. It took two years to build at a cost of $58 million. The Melbourne Ice had to adjust from having the smallest ice surface at Oakleigh to the largest ice surface in Docklands (Olympic sized). ON 1 May 2010, the Ice played their first match at the Icehouse. The match saw the Ice take on the Sydney Ice Dogs in front of a sell out 1,100 strong crowd. The Ice dogs took an early lead through DeCristoforo but Brad Vigon levelled the match in the first period and the Ice went on to dominate the contest. The Ice ended up securing their maiden Icehouse win with a 4–1 scoreline.

Melbourne Ice's head coach, Paul Watson, who had been with the team since 2007, guided the Ice to their most successful period in the team's history between 2010 and 2012. During three consecutive seasons Ice captains, Webster and Vinnie Hughes, led the team to three Goodall Cups, one H Newman Reid Trophy and the one and only Trans-Tasman Champions League trophy. By securing a hat trick of Goodall Cup's the Ice completed the one and only Three-peat in AIHL history.

Melbourne Ice's maiden Goodall Cup victory in 2010 came after the team finished second in the regular season. Paul Watson was named AIHL coach of the year. The Ice's new home venue, The Icehouse, hosted the AIHL finals for the first time. And in front of sell-out home crowds, the Ice overcame the Sydney Bears in the semi-finals, 2–1, before defeating the Adelaide Adrenaline 6–4 in their first Goodall Cup final the Ice had ever contested. Joey Hughes was the first Ice player to score in a Goodall Cup final. Ice's Canadian import, Jason Baclig was named finals MVP.

The 2011 season saw the Ice win the double by claiming both the H Newman Reid Trophy and Goodall Cup. It was the first time in nine years that a team had won the AIHL double. The Ice finished top of the league standings at the end of the regular season with an equal record points haul of 65 (equalling the team's 2006 season total). Jason Baclig backed up his impressive 2010 form and won the league MVP award after scoring 68 points at an average of 2.4 a match. In the finals, the Ice stormed over the Adrenaline in the semi-finals, defeating them 8–3. Matt Armstrong scoring a hat trick and Joey Hughes picking up four points. The Ice then faced the Newcastle North Stars in the Goodall Cup final on 4 September 2011. The Ice made it consecutive national titles with a close fought 3–2 victory. Armstrong, Joey Hughes and Webster all got on the scoring sheet for the Ice but Chwedoruk power play goal with two minutes left for the North Stars had all the Ice fans in the stands on biting there nails. Joey Hughes was then named finals MVP after the match.

In 2012, the AIHL split the regular season into two conferences. The Ice was grouped in the Easton Conference along with all the other non-NSW teams. The Ice topped their conference by eight points ahead of Adelaide to qualify for finals. The 2012 AIHL finals shifted from Melbourne to Newcastle. The Hunter Ice Skating Stadium hosted the weekend. On 1 September 2012, the Ice defeated the Sydney Ice Dogs 6–2 in semi-final 2. The Goodall Cup final was a repeat of the previous season with the Ice taking on the North Stars. For the second year in a row the final between the league's top two teams went down to the wire. The Ice came out on top in the end, winning the match 4–3 after being down 0–2 in the first period. AIHL Commissioner, Tyler Lovering, called the match 'one of the best games ever played'. The Ice's Todd Graham was named finals MVP. Following the team's successes, Ice coach Paul 'Jaffa' Watson stood down from his role as head coach at the club and retired. He was honoured by the Ice by becoming a life member.

8 February 2013, long time Melbourne Ice figure, Sandy Gardner, was named Watson's successor as Ice head coach. It was Gardner's second stint as head coach of the Ice, having led them in 2003 and 2004. In 2013 the Ice finished a disappointing fourth in the regular season and were beaten by the Ice Dogs, 2–4, in the semi-finals. Gardner was then replaced by his assistant, Brent Laver, in 2014. Laver spent three seasons in charge of the Ice. The team twice finished regular season runner-up in 2014 and 2015 before finishing top and claiming the Ice's third H Newman Reid Trophy in 2016. The Ice also made the Goodall Cup final in both 2014 and 2015, however, the team lost both finals, including the first Melbourne derby final against the Melbourne Mustangs.

In 2014, the Ice finished second behind the Mustangs by three points and Jeremy Brown was named rookie of the season. The Ice then demolished the CBR Brave 6–1 in the semi's to reach the team's fourth Goodall Cup final. The final was an all Melbourne affair, 2,000 people in the stands, with the Ice taking on the Mustangs. The score line ended the same as the semi-final but this time the Ice were on the losing side with the Mustangs securing their first Goodall Cup with a 6–1 victory.

In 2015, the Ice again finished second in the league standings, this time behind Newcastle. The team defeated Perth Thunder 1–0 in the semi-finals to record their first finals shutout. In the Goodall Cup final, the Ice faced league premiers and heavy favourites Newcastle. In a close match the two teams could not be separated in regulation time with the score locked two-all. Both teams scored with under two minutes remaining in regulation time. Jan Safar thought he had secured the victory first for the North Stars but Mitch Humphries sent the home fans into raptures a minute later by scoring a short-handed goal to level the match with 31 seconds left on the clock. In overtime, the Ice gave away a penalty shot to the North Stars and Brian Bales calmly converted to defeat the Ice on golden goal. The final score 3–2 to the North Stars.

In 2016, the Ice led the league for much of the season. The Ice only lost three regulation matches all season and ended with a goal difference of +56. After winning the league premiership and Brent Laver being named coach of the season, the Ice faced-off against the CBR Brave for the second time in the semi-finals. Despite outshooting the Brave, the Ice were defeated in overtime. The Brave's conversion on special teams proved a difference but a quick break by Jan Safar, who just came out of the penalty box, was the ultimate difference in OT. Ending the Ice's season early with a 4–3 defeat.

The Ice started a new chapter in 2017 with the appointment of their first Swedish head coach, Charles Franzén. The former Tranås AIF head coach was brought over to Australia as part of a new relationship established between the two clubs. Franzén brought over Tranås players Sebastian Ottosson, Niklas Dahlberg and Kristoffer Backman to play for the Ice in 2017. To complete the complement of Swedish imports, former Mustang's player Viktor Gibbs Sjodin signed with the Ice. In July the Ice held a special 'Sweden Day' to celebrate all things Sweden. The Ice donned a one-time kit in the Swedish yellow and blue colours. The Swedish national anthem was played pre-match, Swedish flags sold at the arena and there was a Pippi Longstocking mascot. Post-match Swedish lollies, herring and caviar was served. The Ice enjoyed their best ever regular season in 2017. The team won 24 of 28 matches for a then record 71 league points, 14 points ahead of their closest rival (Perth Thunder). The team clinched top spot in the league with four matches remaining and Joey Hughes was named AIHL local player of the season. After claiming the team's fourth H Newman Reid Trophy at the end of August, the Ice advanced to the AIHL finals weekend. In the semi-finals, the Ice avenged their finals derby loss from 2014 and defeated the Mustangs 4–2. The following day, the Melbourne Ice faced the CBR Brave in the Goodall Cup final. Wong gave the Ice the lead in the first period before Stephen Blunden levelled for the Brave in the second period. Just before the second intermission Ottosson restored the Ice's lead. The third period was controlled by the Ice and they added to their lead to eventually win the match 4–1. The Ice lifted the Goodall Cup for the fourth time and their first since their three-peat. Sebastian Ottosson was named finals MVP.

Ahead of the 2018 season the Melbourne Ice announced a backroom shuffle and a new head coach appointment. Charles Franzén moved from head coach to Director of Coaching and Player Development with Swedish coach, Peter Ekroth, joining the team. The Ice started the season slowly and after five rounds, four wins and three losses, Ekroth departed the team. Former head coach and long-time Ice member, Sandy Gardner, stepped up from his assistant coach role and took over head coach duties for the remainder of the 2018 season on 9 June 2018. Gardner appointed Mark Smith and Josh Velez as his assistants. With a lot of backroom changes, on-ice performance of the team suffered in 2018. The Ice finished the season seventh, failing to qualify for finals for the first time in thirteen seasons. It was also the first season since 2004 that the Ice finished with a negative goal difference, −27.

After the disappointment of 2018, the Ice made more backroom changes for 2019. Sandy Gardner moved back to his assistant coach role and former Ice player and Mustangs coach Brad Vigon was appointed new head coach. Soon after, Brent Laver and Glen Mayer joined Sandy as assistant coaches to Vigon. Johan Steenberg also re-joined the club to take on the role of Director of hockey operations. Johan had previously worked as the Ice's goaltender coach between 2014 and 2017 before moving to the CBR Brave in 2018. The season started in a similar fashion to 2018 and by 26 May the Ice faced a similar situation as the previous season with their head coach stepping down. Vigon announced his temporary suspension of his head coaching duties for a period of four weeks for personal reasons. Johan and the assistant coaches filled in while Vigon was absent. The Ice finished the season seventh with nine wins from 28 matches for a total of 24 points, their lowest point tally from an eight team season.

On 31 January 2020, Melbourne Ice announced their new head coach for 2020 would be Canadian Michael Marshall. Michael hails from Calgary, Alberta and joins the team off the back of four years coaching in Sweden.

In 2024, Ice started the season strongly under second year coach, Kerry Goulet, winning their first 10 games. After a loss to Perth, they would go on to win 5 in a row before falling to Sydney in overtime. A late season slump saw them second overall on the ladder and second in the Hellyer conference. In the finals they easily accounted for Brisbane 5-0 in the preliminary final. After narrowly beating Newcastle in a come from behind win in the semi final (after being down 1-3 heading into the last period), they qualified for their first grand final since 2017 against Canberra. They were soundly defeated by Brave 0-5 ending their season.

Spurred on by their 2024 grand final defeat, Melbourne were the most competitive team in the 2025 AIHL season, winning 20 games, five more than the next closest team. Only losing 2 games in regulation for the whole season, they comfortably finished on top of the ladder. They faced Newcastle again in the semi final. Leading 4-0 early in the second period, Newcastle came back with a burst of 3 goals in under two minutes. However Ice fought back to take a 6-4 victory, setting up a grand final rematch with Canberra. This year Ice were not to be denied. In the first period, Ice took a 3-0 lead. In a repeat of their previous final, Brave scored 3 unanswered goals to level the score. With 3 minutes to go in the period, Tyrone Bront scored to regain the lead. In the last period, Melbourne ran away with 3 more goals to win 7-3, avenging their previous grand final defeat and winning their first Goodall cup since 2017.

== Season-by-season results ==
Melbourne Ice all-time record
Season	Regular season											Finals									Top points scorer
Season	P	W	T	L	OW	OL	GF	GA	GD	Pts	Finish	P	W	L	GF	GA	Result	Preliminary Final	Semi Final	Goodall Cup Final	Name	Points
2002	16	2	–	14	–	–	30	54	-24	4	6th	–									Information not available
2003^{1}	20	4	1	15	–	–	41	97	-56	11	5th	–									Information not available
2004	26	5	1	18	2	–	53	71	-18	20	5th	–									(Australia) Thomas Powell	21
2005	26	9	–	13	2	2	100	96	+4	33	6th	–									(Australia) Lliam Webster	36
2006	28	21	–	5	–	2	109	72	+37	65	1st	1	–	1	1	6	Semi-finalist	–	Lost 1–6 (North Stars)	–	(Australia) Lliam Webster	34
2007	28	14	–	7	4	3	111	84	+27	53	2nd	1	–	1	3	6	Semi-finalist	–	Lost 3–6 (North Stars)	–	(Australia) Thomas Powell	34
2008	28	17	–	10	1	–	124	91	+33	54	3rd	1	–	1	1	2	Semi-finalist	–	Lost 1–2 (OT) (Ice Dogs)	–	(Canada) Ryan Tremblay	51
2009	24	15	–	6	–	3	113	77	+36	48	2nd	1	–	1	1	6	Semi-finalist	–	Lost 1–6 (Adrenaline)	–	(Canada) Matthew Watkins	54
2010	24	15	–	3	1	5	122	65	+57	52	2nd	2	2	–	8	5	Champions	–	Won 2–1 (Bears)	Won 6–4 (Adrenaline)	(Canada) Jason Baclig	44
2011	28	18	–	2	3	5	146	93	+53	65	1st	2	2	–	11	5	Champions	–	Won 8–3 (Adrenaline)	Won 3–2 (North Stars)	(Canada) Jason Baclig	68
2012	24	15	–	6	3	–	109	68	+41	51	2nd	2	2	–	10	5	Champions	–	Won 6–2 (Ice Dogs)	Won 4–3 (North Stars)	(Canada) Matt Armstrong	51
2013	28	16	–	8	1	3	147	93	+54	53	4th	1	–	1	2	4	Semi-finalist	–	Lost 2–4 (Ice Dogs)	–	(Canada) Jason Baclig	62
2014	28	14	–	8	3	3	104	88	+16	51	2nd	2	1	1	7	7	Runner-up	–	Won 6–1 (Brave)	Lost 1–6 (Mustangs)	(Canada) Matt Armstrong	43
2015	28	15	–	7	5	1	121	83	+38	56	2nd	2	1	1	3	3	Runner-up	–	Won 1–0 (Thunder)	Lost 2–3 (OT) (North Stars)	(Australia) Thomas Powell	52
2016	28	19	–	3	3	3	127	71	+56	66	1st	1	–	1	3	4	Semi-finalist	–	Lost 3–4 (OT) (Brave)	–	(Canada) Jason Baclig	48
2017	28	22	–	3	2	1	132	75	+57	71	1st	2	2	–	8	3	Champions	–	Won 4–2 (Mustangs)	Won 4–1 (Brave)	(Australia) Joseph Hughes	43
2018	28	7	–	15	2	4	87	114	-27	29	7th	–									(Canada) Dillon Lawrence	33
2019	28	6	–	19	–	3	90	140	-50	24	7th	–									(Australia) Thomas Powell	28
2020	2020 and 2021 AIHL seasons were cancelled and not contested
2021	2020 and 2021 AIHL seasons were cancelled and not contested
2022	20	3	–	15	2	0	54	116	-62	13	5th	–									(Canada) Josh Walt	17
2023	26	10	–	16	0	0	144	165	-21	30	6th	–									(Australia) Chris Schutz	53
2024	30	18	–	7	2	3	154	99	+55	58	2nd	3	2	1	9	8	Runner-up	Won 5–0 (Lightning)	Won 4–3 (Northstars)	Lost 0–5 (Brave)	(United States) Austin Albrecht	68
2025	28	20	–	2	2	4	183	103	+80	68	1st	2	2	0	13	7	Champions	–	Won 6-4 (Northstars)	Won 7-3 (Brave)	(United States) David Booth	69
2026	30	13	–	12	2	3	150	142	+8	44	7th	–									(Australia) Mac Caruana	57
2027	–	–	–	–	–	–	–	–	–	–	–	–	–	–	–	–	–	–	–	–	–	–
Totals	572	285	2	202	38	45	2401	2015	+386			23	14	9	80	71

^{1} 2003 AIHL season statistics are unofficial. The AIHL has not published official statistics on www.theaihl.com. Data has been collected from web archives of the Newcastle Northstars and Ice Hockey Australia game reports.

Champions	Runners-up	Third place

== Championships ==
- Goodall Cup

(gold) Champions (5): 2010, 2011, 2012, 2017, 2025
(silver) Runners-Up (3): 2014, 2015, 2024

- H Newman Reid Trophy (2008–Current)

(gold) Premiers (3): 2011, 2016, 2017, 2025
(silver) Runners-Up (5): 2009, 2010, 2014, 2015, 2024

- V.I.P. Cup (2004–07)

(gold) Premiers (1): 2006
(silver) Runners-Up (1): 2007

- Hellyer Conference

(silver) Runners-Up (1): 2024

- Easton Conference

(gold) Winners (1): 2012

- Trans-Tasman Champions League

(gold) Winners (1): 2012

== Players ==
=== Current roster ===
Team roster for the 2026 AIHL season.

Melbourne Ice roster - 2026 AIHL season
Active roster		Inactive roster	Coaching staff
Goaltenders: 31 (Australia) Corey Dang; 35 (Japan) Tatsunoshin Ishida (I); 69 (Australia) Mackenzie Hill; 74 (Australia) Thomas Forrest; Defencemen: 3 (Australia) Todd Graham; 4 (Australia) Michael McMahon (A); 6 (Australia) Nathan Cachia (A); 8 (Australia) Lachie Walls; 17 (Australia) Tobie Gilchrist; 23 (Australia) Lachlan Cincotta; 25 (Canada) John Aonso (I); 47 (Canada) Simon Després (I)	Forwards: 2 (Australia) Lliam Webster; 5 (Australia) Tyrone Bronte; 9 (Australia) Mac Caruana (A); 10 (Sweden) Joakim Erdugan; 11 (Australia) Jed Lake; 13 (Australia) Christian Pansino; 18 (Canada) Kolton Shindle (I); 19 (Australia) Corey Stringer; 40 (United States) David Booth (I); 42 (Canada) Josh Adkins (I); 46 (Australia) Alexei Rayzman; 68 (New Zealand) Lachie Hodge; 71 (Australia) Tristan Fraser; 81 (Australia) Austin McKenzie; 86 (Canada) Raymond Khalil; 88 (Australia) Sai Lake; 91 (Australia) Jamie Bourke; 94 (Australia) Matthew Last; 98 (Australia) Ellesse Carini	22 (Australia) Costa Houdalakis; 88 (Canada) Brandon Lucchesi (I); - (Australia) Liam Scrimshaw	Head Coach: (Canada) Kerry Goulet; Coaches: (Germany) Marvin Krüger; (Australia) Michael Flaherty; Legend (C) Captain (A) Alternate Captain (I) Import player Statistics; Average age: 27.23; Average height: 182.64 cm Average weight: 84.43 kg Locals: 26; Imports: 6
Last updated on: 19 July 2026
Elite Prospects IHNA

=== Retired numbers ===
Throughout the history of the Melbourne Ice, one jersey number has been retired in honour of a former club legend.

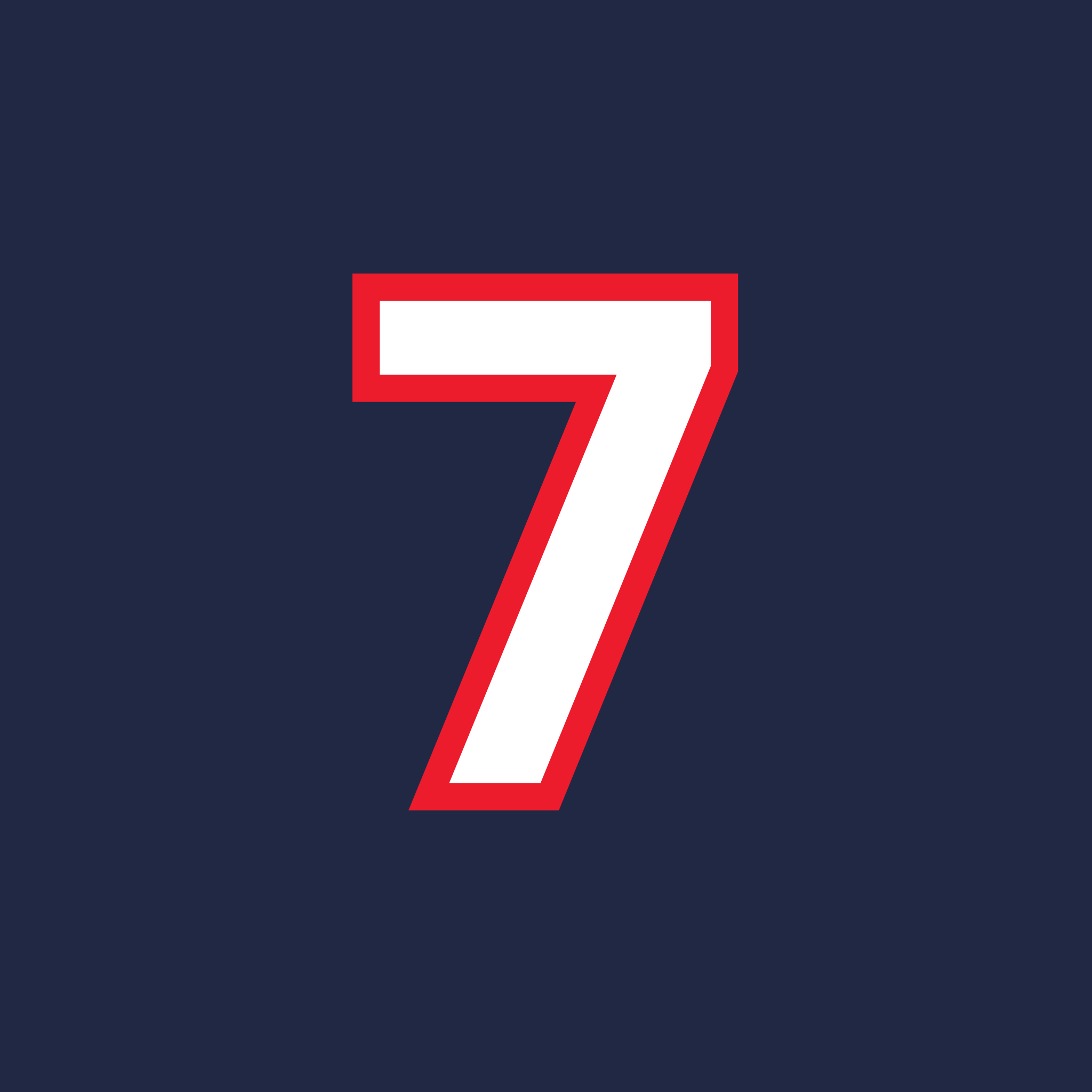
Retired number	History
	(Australia) Vincent Hughes – # 7 (2004–2013, 2025, defenceman); Vincent 'Vinnie' Hughes played for the Ice for ten years, racking up 159 matches for the team. The defenceman captained the Ice in 2011 and 2012. Vinnie won four Goodall Cups with the Ice including the fabled three-peat between 2010 and 2013. Hughes was a part of and won the one and only Trans-Tasman Champions League in 2012 with the Melbourne Ice. Humble to the end, Vinnie described his career, including his time with the Ice, as "A journey, from start to finish", when he retired in 2016. In 2018, on 26 August, Vinnie Hughes was celebrated by the Melbourne Ice community with the retirement of his number seven jersey in a pre-match ceremony at the Melbourne Icehouse on the Ice's Heritage Day. The team then donned a retro-styled uniform for the occasion.

=== Player records ===
These are the top-ten all-time player records in franchise history for the following categories: Apperiences, goals, assists, points and penalty minutes
(Figures are updated after each completed AIHL regular season)
Current as of 2025 AIHL season

All-time Appearances
#	Name	Pos	GP
1	(Australia) Lliam Webster	C	387
2	(Australia) Tommy Powell	F	384
3	(Australia) Austin McKenzie	F	278
4	(Canada) Matt Armstrong	F	243
5	(Australia) Greg Sturrock	D	232
6	(Australia) Todd Graham	D	217
7	(Canada) Jason Baclig	F	215
8	(Australia) Marcus Wong	D	205
9	(Australia) Joey Hughes	F	197
10	(Australia) Jack Carpenter	D	182

All-time Goals
#	Name	Pos	G
1	(Australia) Lliam Webster	C	210
2	(Australia) Tommy Powell	F	175
3	(Canada) Matt Armstrong	F	156
4	(Canada) Jason Baclig	F	148
5	(Australia) Joey Hughes	F	135
6	(Canada) Mack Caruana	F	67
7	(Australia) Austin McKenzie	F	54
8	(Australia) Jamie Bourke	F	48
9	(United States) Roman Kraemer	F	39
10	(United States) Brad Vigon	C	38

All-time Assists
#	Name	Pos	A
1	(Australia) Tommy Powell	F	301
2	(Australia) Lliam Webster	C	266
3	(Canada) Matt Armstrong	F	225
4	(Canada) Jason Baclig	F	189
5	(Australia) Joey Hughes	F	184
6	(Australia) Todd Graham	D	108
7	(Canada) Mack Caruana	F	105
8	(Australia) Jamie Bourke	F	73
9	(Australia) Austin McKenzie	F	64
10	(Sweden) Joakim Erdugan	F	63

All-time Points
#	Name	Pos	Pts
1	(Australia) Lliam Webster	C	476
2	(Australia) Tommy Powell	F	467
3	(Canada) Matt Armstrong	F	381
4	(Canada) Jason Baclig	D	337
5	(Australia) Joey Hughes	F	319
6	(Canada) Mack Caruana	F	172
7	(Australia) Todd Graham	D	137
8	(Australia) Jamie Bourke	F	121
9	(Australia) Austin McKenzie	F	118
10	(Sweden) Joakim Erdugan	F	94

All-time Penalties
#	Name	Pos	PIM
1	(Australia) Lliam Webster	C	1115
2	(Australia) Vincent Hughes	D	704
3	(Australia) Joey Hughes	F	664
4	(Canada) Matt Armstrong	F	370
5	(Australia) Greg Sturrock	D	351
6	(Australia) Jamie Bourke	F	330
7	(Australia) Dylan Moore	D	222
8	(Australia) Cass Delsar	F	208
9	(Canada) Steve Laforet	F	182
10	(Australia) Todd Graham	D	180

Legend:

Current Ice player

== Club Staff ==
Current as of 2024 AIHL season.

Ice staff
Role	Name
Head coach	(Canada) Kerry Goulet
Assistant Coach	(United States) Austin Lefkowicz
Assistant Coach	(Australia) Joseph Nyamuka
Equipment Manager	(Scotland) Tom Harward
Physiotherapist	(Australia) Luke Fuller
Physiotherapist	(Australia) Olivia Skerman
Medic	(Australia) Sue Murphy
Director of JD	(Australia) Warren Porter
Chief Executive Officer	(Australia) Peter Jon Hartshorne
Governor	(Australia) Peter Jon Hartshorne
Assistant Governor	(Australia) Kahl Heinze

== Leaders ==
=== Team captains ===
The Melbourne Ice have had a total of eleven captains in the team's history. Lliam Webster has held captaincy for the longest in Ice history, with 8 seasons. The foundation captaincy for the Ice was shared between American born Jon Moses and Canadian Glenn Grandy in 2002.

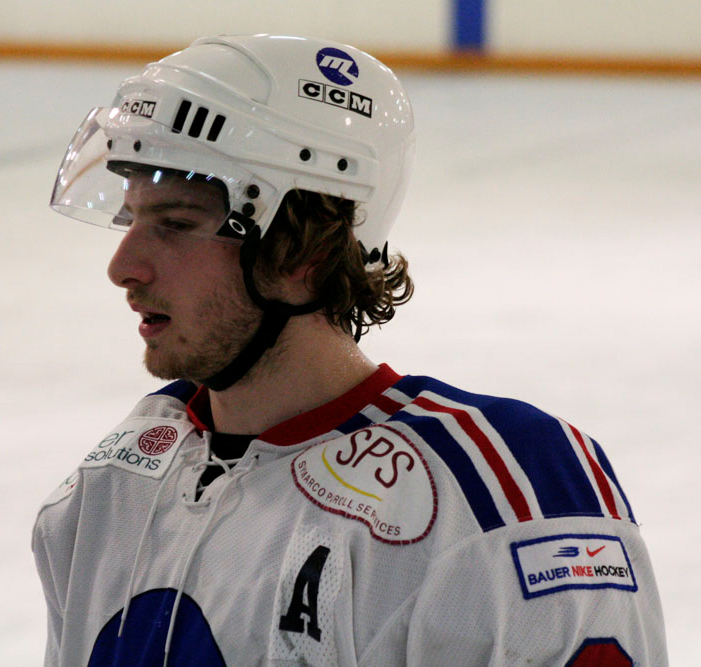
Lliam Webster from 2007, Ice's longest serving team captain (2009–10; 2014–21)

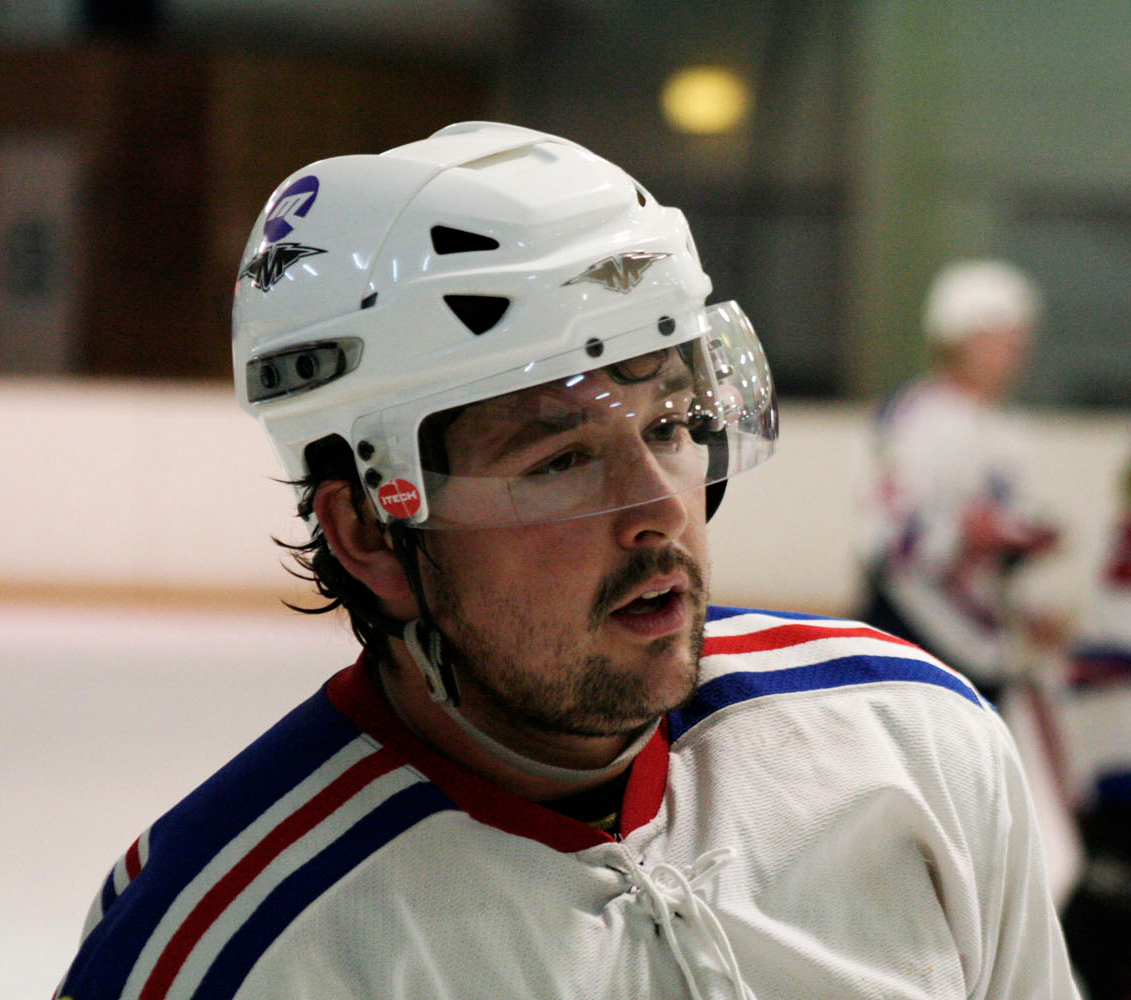
Vinnie Hughes from 2007, Ice's team captain for two of the three-peet years (2011–12)

No.	Name	Term
1	(United States) Jon Moses	2002
2	(Canada) Glenn Grandy	2002–03
3	(Canada) Mike Mazzuca	2004
4	(United States) Brad Vigon	2005–06
5	(Australia) Doug Ferguson	2007–08
6	(Australia) Lliam Webster	2009–10
7	(Australia) Vincent Hughes	2011–12
8	(Canada) Jason Baclig	2013
9	(Australia) Lliam Webster	2014–19
10	(Australia) Austin McKenzie	2022
11	(Canada) Mack Caruana	2022–present

=== Head coaches ===
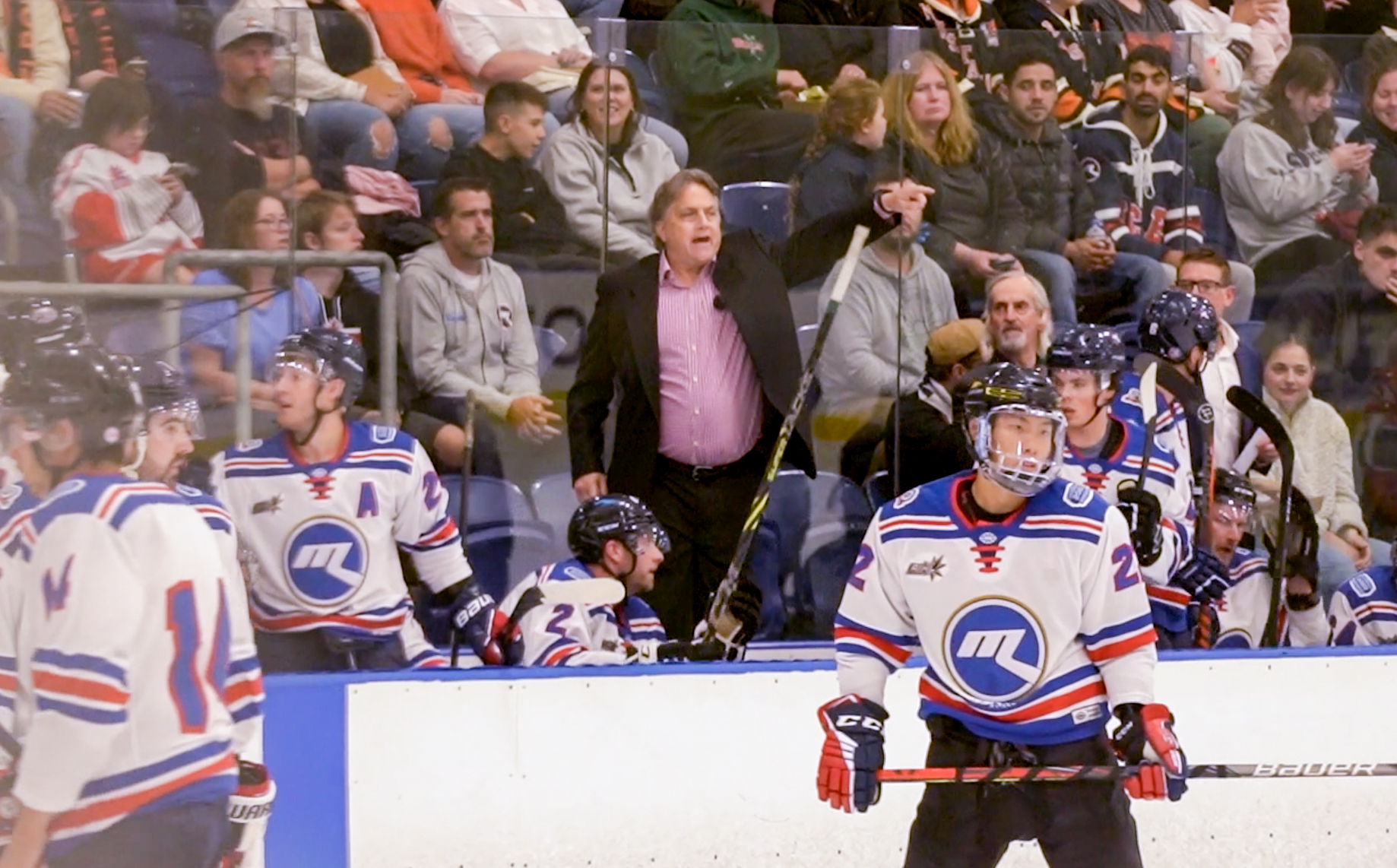
Kerry Goulet and the Ice face the Mustangs in a 2023 pre-season game.

The Melbourne Ice have had a total of fourteen head coaches in the team's history. Rod Johns was the first head coach appointed by the Melbourne Ice for the AIHL in their inaugural season in 2002.

No.	Name	Term
1	(Canada) Rod Johns	2002
2	(Australia) Sandy Gardner	2003–04
3	(Australia) Roy Sargent	2005–06
4	(Australia) Paul Watson	2007–12
5	(Australia) Sandy Gardner	2013
6	(Australia) Brent Laver	2014–16
7	(Sweden) Charles Franzén	2017
8	(Sweden) Peter Ekroth	2018
9	(Australia) Sandy Gardner (I)	2018
10	(United States) Brad Vigon	2019
11	(Canada) Michael Marshall	2020
12	(Japan) Chris Yule	2021
13	(Australia) Sandy Gardner	2022
14	(Canada) Kerry Goulet	2023–present

== Identity ==
=== Name and colours ===
The Melbourne Ice have kept the same colours since foundation in 2002. Navy blue, crimson red and white are the three primary colours the club uses for their identity. The colours are used in all aspects of the club including: uniforms, supporter merchandise, official media and digital design. In 2017, the Ice held a Swedish Day event to celebrate their Swedish ties, including five Swedish players, coaches Charles Franzen and Johan Steenberg, and a relationship with the Tranås AIF ice hockey club in Sweden. The Ice donned a one-off yellow and blue jersey for the occasion. The Melbourne Ice have never changed their name in their history. Since foundation in 2002, they have always been known as the Ice.

=== Facilities ===
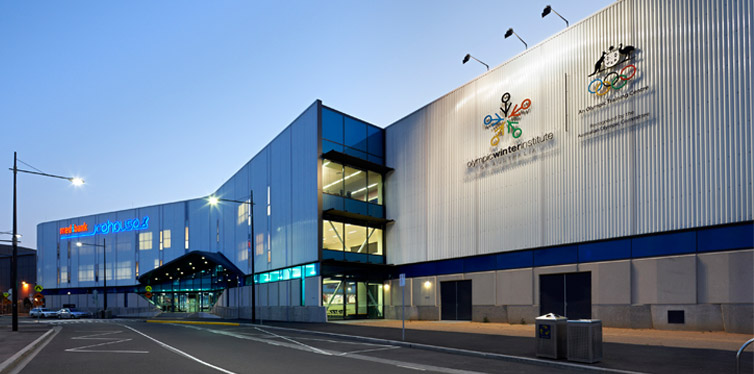
Entrance to O'Brien Icehouse

February 2010, the Melbourne Ice moved into the newly completed $58m O'Brien Icehouse (previously Medibank Icehouse), located in the Docklands precinct of Melbourne. The Ice have played all their home matches from the 2010 AIHL season onwards at the Icehouse and they share the facility with local rivals, the Melbourne Mustangs. The Icehouse is the only twin ice-sheet facility in Australia. The hockey rink within the facility is named the Henke Rink, in honour of Geoffrey Henke AO. The Icehouse has an Olympic sized ice surface, café, bar, specialist winter sports gym, pro shop, corporate boxes and seating for 2,000 spectators as well as room for additional 500 standing attendance on match days.

Prior to 2010, for eight years, the Ice were based in Oakleigh South, Monash in the wider Melbourne metropolitan area. Their home venue was the 300 capacity Olympic Ice Skating Centre (OISC), noted at the time for being the smallest rink in the league, with its width two-thirds that of a regulation Olympic-sized rink.

Stadium history
Rink	Location	Term
Olympic Ice Skating Centre	Oakleigh South	2002–09
O'Brien Icehouse	Docklands	2010–present

=== Rivalries ===
Melbourne Mustangs

The Ice's main rival is the Melbourne Mustangs. The two may share the same home venue, but the Melbourne derby has developed into one of the big fixtures in the AIHL each season. The derbies are regular sell-out matches during the regular season and are known to be heavily physical affairs with high numbers of penalty minutes. There have been two Melbourne derby matches in AIHL finals history, including one Goodall Cup final. The Ice and Mustangs share the spoils in these finals matches with one win apiece.

Sydney Bears

The Ice share a heated interstate rivalry with the Sydney Bears. As two of the most storied clubs in the Australian Ice Hockey League, their meetings have frequently shaped the championship race. Multiple finals clashes — including Goodall Cup deciders — have seen both sides eliminate the other, adding lasting edge to the matchup. Regular-season games are typically fast, physical, and viewed as benchmark contests between Melbourne and Sydney’s oldest hockey programs.

Canberra Brave

The Melbourne Ice have developed a relatively new but increasingly intense rivalry with the Canberra Brave in the Australian Ice Hockey League. Since the Brave entered the league in 2014, meetings between the clubs have frequently carried playoff implications, including high-stakes finals encounters. Despite its recent origins, the matchup has quickly gained edge, with fast-paced, physical contests and occasional aggressive on-ice exchanges contributing to its growing reputation. The fixture reflects a clash between an established powerhouse and a club that rapidly rose to championship contention.

== Broadcasting ==
Current:

- AIHL.TV (2023–present) – Worldwide paid subscription-based online video broadcasting published by the AIHL in partnership with the Swedish company StayLive AB platform using local production companies at each team’s rink. In Melbourne ATC Productions is the local production company. The service went live in April 2023 in partnership with Clutch.TV, and would cover every AIHL regular season and finals games live and on demand. In 2024, the service expanded to offer Apple iOS and Andriod Play apps.
- Sportradar (2022 - present) – International online video broadcasting in North America and Europe as part of a league-wide 3-year deal signed in March 2022 in the lead up to the 2022 AIHL season.

Former:

- Kayo Sports (2022 - 2023) – Domestic online video broadcasting in Australia as part of the league wide deal struck in the lead up to the 2022 AIHL season to show every AIHL game live. ATC Productions producing the streams.
- Fox Sports (2013 – 2019) – Part of the entire AIHL domestic TV broadcasting deal with Fox Sports to show one game a round, normally on Thursday's at 4:30 pm or after NHL games during NHL season.
- YouTube (2017–2019) – Between 2017 and 2019 the Melbourne Ice home games were live-streamed from the Icehouse in Melbourne on the YouTube platform through ATC Productions. The broadcast was called "AIHL TV" and was a partnership between ATC Productions, the AIHL, Melbourne Mustangs, and Melbourne Ice. All matches are available on demand.
