= 2016 CBR Brave season =

2016 CBR Brave
- League: 4th AIHL
- 2016 record: 15–2–2–9
- Home record: 9–0–1–4
- Road record: 6–2–1–5
- Goals for: 129
- Goals against: 117

Team information
- Coach: (United States) Josh Unice (Canada) Art Bidlevskii (Interim head coach)
- Assistant coach: (United States) David Rogina
- Captain: (Australia) Jordan Gavin
- Alternate captains: (United States) Ryan Johnson (Australia) Kai Miettinen
- Arena: Phillip Ice Skating Centre

Team leaders
- Goals: (Canada) Stephen Blunden (20) (Canada) Geordie Wudrick
- Assists: (Australia) Casey Kubara (33)
- Points: (Canada) Geordie Wudrick (50)
- Penalty minutes: (Australia) Harrison Byers (108)
- Goals against average: (Australia) Alex Tetreault (4.72)

The 2016 CBR Brave season was the Brave's 3rd season in the Australian Ice Hockey League since being founded and entering the league in 2014. The season ran from 23 April 2016 to 28 August 2016 for the Brave. CBR finished fourth in the regular season behind the Melbourne Ice, Perth Thunder and Newcastle North Stars. The Brave qualified for the AIHL Finals in Melbourne and played in semi-final one. Canberra defeated the Ice 4–3 in overtime to qualify for the Goodall Cup Final for the first time in franchise history. The Brave were defeated in the final by the North Stars 1–2.

== News ==
In March 2016, Josh Unice was named as Brave head coach for the 2016 AIHL season. The inexperienced former goaltender was joined by experienced assistant coach Dave Rogina and strength and conditioning trainer Stuart Philps.

In April 2016, The Brave announced their playing roster for the season. The bulk of the roster returned from 2015 but the team confirmed six imported players from overseas including the inter-league transfer of AIHL MVP Geordie Wudrick from the Newcastle North Stars. The Brave also announced two new partnerships in the month of April. Firstly, a new marketing and supporter partnership with Canberra's national baseball team, the Canberra Cavalry. And secondly, a promotional partnership with Australian Defence Force hockey team the Navy Tigersharks with the goal to help promote the sport in the ADF.

Six matches into the 2016 season, import Canadian defenceman, Art Bidlevskii, was hospitalised after a freak accident in an ugly AIHL match in Newcastle between rivals the North Stars and Brave. Art's voice box was shattered, he lost his voice for a period of time, he was almost placed in a coma and he was told he could die if he played ice hockey again. The accident ended the twenty five year old's playing career. Art took up a role as assistant coach with the team following his release from hospital.

In August, one week before the end of the regular season, the CBR Brave management announced the sudden departure of Josh Unice from the team for personal reasons. Art Bidlevskii was named as replacement head coach on an interim basis for the final match of the regular season and the finals series. The CBR Brave finished the season in fourth place after a surprise 6–4 loss to last placed Sydney Ice Dogs in Liverpool, Sydney. The team qualified for the finals weekend in Melbourne where they would face league premiers, the Melbourne Ice in the first semi-final match.

In September, post-finals, CBR Brave players took out a hat-trick of AIHL player awards for the 2016 season. Czech import, Jan Safar, was named AIHL Defenceman of the season for the second straight year while Casey Kubara was awarded both the Local Player of the year as well as Rookie of the year awards.

== Roster ==
Team roster for the 2016 AIHL season

2016 AIHL CBR Brave Roster
#	Nat	Name	Pos	S/G	Age	Acquired	Birthplace
4	(Canada)	Art Bidlevskii	D	R	25	2016	Kelowna, British Columbia, Canada
73	(Canada)	Stephen Blunden	LW	L	27	2014	Gloucester, Ontario, Canada
10	(Australia)	Zachary Boyle	D	L	20	2016	Adelaide, South Australia, Australia
8	(Switzerland)	Nicola Brandi	LW	R	22	2016	Wetzikon, Hinwil, Switzerland
21	(Australia)	Jordan Brunt	F	L	16	2015	Canberra, Australian Capital Territory, Australia
22	(Australia)	Harrison Byers	C	R	23	2014	Regina, Saskatchewan, Canada
17	(Australia)	James Byers	D	R	22	2014	Canberra, Australian Capital Territory, Australia
23	(Australia)	Timothy Cox	D	R	28–29	2016	Australia
38	(Australia)	Nickolas Eckhardt	G	L	26	2014	Canberra, Australian Capital Territory, Australia
19	(Australia)	Jordan Gavin (C)	F	R	33–34	2014	Canberra, Australian Capital Territory, Australia
14	(Australia)	Matt Gilpin	F	R	20	2016	Queensland, Australia
2	(Canada)	Mathieu Guertin	LW	L	24	2016	Repentigny, Quebec, Canada
86	(New Zealand)	Matthew Harvey	D	R	30	2014	Calgary, Alberta, Canada
18	(Australia)	Mitchell Henning	F	R	18	2016	Brisbane, Queensland, Australia
3	(United States)	Ryan Johnson (A)	F	R	41–42	2014	Amesbury, Massachusetts, United States
15	(Australia)	Casey Kubara	RW	R	20	2016	Wombarra, New South Wales, Australia
16	(Australia)	Tyler Kubara	F	R	21	2015	Wombarra, New South Wales, Australia
77	(Australia)	Tom Letki	F	R	27	2014	Canberra, Australian Capital Territory, Australia
28	(Australia)	Matti Louma	RW	R	36	2016	Helsinki, Finland
64	(Australia)	Kai Miettinen (A)	F	L	20	2014	Canberra, Australian Capital Territory, Australia
27	(Australia)	Luke Moore	D	R	20	2016	Belfast, United Kingdom
13	(Australia)	Luke Philps	F	R	33	2016	Australia
9	(Canada)	Neal Prokop	C	L	26	2016	Winnipeg, Manitoba, Canada
12	(Australia)	Mark Rummukainen	D	R	34	2014	Canberra, Australian Capital Territory, Australia
24	(Czech Republic)	Jan Safar	D	R	29	2016	Praha, Czech Republic
20	(Australia)	Alexandre Tetreault	G	L	18	2015	Montreal, Quebec, Canada
5	(Australia)	Aleksi Toivonen	G	L	20	2015	Canberra, Australian Capital Territory, Australia
88	(Canada)	Geordie Wudrick	LW	L	26	2016	Abbotsford, British Columbia, Canada

== Transfers ==
All the player transfers in and out by the CBR Brave for the 2016 AIHL season.

=== In ===
Pos	Player	Transferred From	Local / Import
D	(Canada) Art Bidlevskii	(Sweden) Kallinge-Ronneby IF	Import
D	(Australia) Zachary Boyle	(Australia) Adelaide Adrenaline	Local
W	(Switzerland) Nicola Brandi	(Switzerland) SC Rapperswil-Jona Lakers	Import
D	(Australia) Timothy Cox	No team	Local
F	(Australia) Matt Gilpin	No team	Local
W	(Canada) Mathieu Guertin	(Canada) Trois-Rivières Blizzard	Import
F	(Australia) Mitchell Henning	No team	Local
W	(Australia) Casey Kubara	(United States) Atlanta Jr. Knights	Local
W	(Australia) Matti Luoma	No team	Local
D	(Australia) Luke Moore	No team]	Local
F	(Australia) Luke Philps	No team	Local
C	(Canada) Neal Prokop	No team	Import
D	(Czech Republic) Jan Safar	(Australia) Newcastle North Stars	Import
W	(Canada) Geordie Wudrick	(Australia) Newcastle North Stars	Import

=== Out ===
Pos	Player	Transferred To	Local / Import
D	(Australia) Aaron Clayworth	No team	Local
D/F	(Australia) David Dunwoodie	(Australia) Sydney Ice Dogs	Local
W	(Canada) Kelly Geoffrey	(France) Aigles de La Roche sur Yon	Import
D/F	(Canada) Mike Giorgi	No team	Import
F	(Australia) David Lewis	No team	Local
F	(Australia) Jayden Lewis	No team	Local
D	(Australia) Tomas Manco	(Australia) Sydney Ice Dogs	Local
D	(Canada) Kyle Mariani	(France) Bouquetins de Val Vanoise	Import
D	(Australia) Ben Pagett	No team	Local
C	(Canada) Jordan Peddle	(Canada) Terrace River Kings	Import
C	(Canada) Scott Pitt	(Scotland) Braehead Clan	Import
F	(Australia) Alain Riesen	No team	Local
D/F	(Australia) Peter Taylor	No team	Local
G	(United States) Josh Unice	(Australia) CBR Brave (head coach)	Import
G	(Australia) Stuart Woodall	No team	Local

== Staff ==
Staff Roster for 2016 AIHL season

2016 AIHL CBR Brave Staff
Role	Staff
Head coach	(United States) Josh Unice
Assistant coach	(United States) David Rogina
Assistant coach	(Canada) Art Bidlevskii
Strength and conditioning coach	(Australia) Stuart Philps
Physiotherapist	(Australia) Sportstec
Equipment manager	(Australia) Adrian Miller
Bench official	(Australia) Darren Sault
Bench official	(Australia) Kelly Sault

== Standings ==
=== Regular season ===
Summary

Season	Overall										Home								Away							
Season	P	W	L	OW	OL	GF	GA	GD	Pts	Finish	P	W	L	OW	OL	GF	GA	GD	P	W	L	OW	OL	GF	GA	GD
2016	28	15	9	2	2	129	117	+12	51	4th	14	9	4	0	1	70	56	+14	14	6	5	2	1	59	61	-2

Position by round

Round	1	2	3	4	5	6	7	8	9	10	11	12	13	14	15	16	17
Position	1	1	2	4	4	4	4	3	4	4	4	4	3	4	4	3	4

Updated to match(es) played on Completed. Source: www.icehockeynewsaustralia.com

League table

Team	GP	W	SOW	SOL	L	GF	GA	GDF	PTS
Melbourne Ice	28	19	3	3	3	127	71	+56	66
Perth Thunder	28	16	4	1	7	96	73	+23	57
Newcastle North Stars	28	15	1	5	7	105	74	+31	52
CBR Brave	28	15	2	2	9	129	117	+12	51
Melbourne Mustangs	28	11	2	0	15	89	102	−13	37
Sydney Bears	28	5	5	3	15	77	95	−18	28
Sydney Ice Dogs	28	7	1	1	19	92	139	−47	24
Adelaide Adrenaline	28	5	1	4	18	83	127	−44	21

Qualified for the Goodall Cup playoffs	H Newman Reid Trophy winners

=== Finals ===
Summary

Season	Finals weekend							
Season	P	W	L	GF	GA	Result	Semi-final	Goodall Cup final
2016	2	1	1	5	5	Runners-up	Won 4-3 (OT) (Ice)	Lost 1-2 (North Stars)

Bracket

Semifinals
1	Melbourne Ice	3
4	CBR Brave	4*
3	Newcastle North Stars	3*
2	Perth Thunder	2

Final
CBR Brave	1
Newcastle North Stars	2

* denotes number of overtime periods

== Schedule & results ==
=== Regular season ===
Matchday	1	2	3	4	5	6	7	8	9	10	11	12	13	14	15	16	17	18	19	20	21	22	23	24	25	26	27	28
Arena	H	A	A	A	H	A	H	H	A	H	H	A	A	H	H	H	A	A	A	H	H	H	A	H	H	A	A	A
Result	W	W	W	L	L	W	L	L	L	W	W	L	L	W	W	L	W	L	W	W	W	W	W	L	W	W	W	L

Updated to match(es) played on Completed. Source: AIHL
A = Away; H = Home; W = Win; L = Loss

2016 fixtures and results
Date	Time	Away	Score	Home	Location	Recap
23 April	17:00	Sydney Ice Dogs	2–5	CBR Brave	Phillip Ice Skating Centre	
24 April	17:00	CBR Brave	6–3	Sydney Bears	Penrith Ice Palace	
30 April	17:00	CBR Brave	4–2	Melbourne Mustangs	O'Brien Group Arena	
1 May	16:00	CBR Brave	1–7	Melbourne Mustangs	O'Brien Group Arena	
7 May	17:00	Sydney Bears	3 – 2 (SO)	CBR Brave	Phillip Ice Skating Centre	
8 May	17:00	CBR Brave	4 – 3 (SO)	Newcastle North Stars	Hunter Ice Skating Stadium	
14 May	17:30	Perth Thunder	6–2	CBR Brave	Phillip Ice Skating Centre	
15 May	17:00	Perth Thunder	7–6	CBR Brave	Phillip Ice Skating Centre	
22 May	17:00	CBR Brave	2–7	Newcastle North Stars	Hunter Ice Skating Stadium	
28 May	17:30	Newcastle North Stars	3–5	CBR Brave	Phillip Ice Skating Centre	
29 May	17:00	Sydney Bears	4–6	CBR Brave	Phillip Ice Skating Centre	
4 June	17:00	CBR Brave	5–7	Melbourne Ice	O'Brien Group Arena	
5 June	16:00	CBR Brave	3–6	Melbourne Ice	O'Brien Group Arena	
18 June	17:30	Melbourne Mustangs	2–5	CBR Brave	Phillip Ice Skating Centre	
19 June	17:00	Melbourne Mustangs	1–4	CBR Brave	Phillip Ice Skating Centre	
2 July	17:30	Newcastle North Stars	3–1	CBR Brave	Phillip Ice Skating Centre	
3 July	17:00	CBR Brave	6–1	Sydney Ice Dogs	Liverpool Catholic Club Ice Rink	
9 July	16:30	CBR Brave	3 – 4 (SO)	Perth Thunder	Perth Ice Arena	
10 July	16:30	CBR Brave	4–2	Perth Thunder	Perth Ice Arena	
16 July	17:30	Sydney Ice Dogs	5–6	CBR Brave	Phillip Ice Skating Centre	
23 July	17:30	Adelaide Adrenaline	2–7	CBR Brave	Phillip Ice Skating Centre	
24 July	17:00	Adelaide Adrenaline	5–8	CBR Brave	Phillip Ice Skating Centre	
31 July	17:00	CBR Brave	6–4	Sydney Bears	Penrith Ice Palace	
6 August	17:30	Melbourne Ice	10–9	CBR Brave	Phillip Ice Skating Centre	
7 August	17:00	Melbourne Ice	3–4	CBR Brave	Phillip Ice Skating Centre	
13 August	16:30	CBR Brave	5 – 4 (SO)	Adelaide Adrenaline	Adelaide Ice Arena	
14 August	16:00	CBR Brave	6–5	Adelaide Adrenaline	Adelaide Ice Arena	
20 August	17:00	CBR Brave	4–6	Sydney Ice Dogs	Liverpool Catholic Club Ice Rink	

=== Finals ===
Goodall Cup semi-final All times are UTC+10:00

27 August 2016; 15:00	CBR Brave	4 – 3 OT (1–1, 1–1, 1–1, 1–0)	Melbourne Ice	O'Brien Group Arena

Game reference

Aleksi Toivonen
Goalies
Troy Davenport
Referee:
Jeff Scott
Linesmen:
Fraser Ohlson
Casper Russell-Huber

2:43 – Safar (PP) (T. Kubara, Miettinen)	1 – 0
	1 – 1	13:27 – Lassen (PP) (Graham, Armstrong)
	1 – 2	26:01 – Hughes (Baclig, Yule)
29:47 – Wudrick (PP) (Safar, Brandi)	2 – 2
44:31 – Wudrick (PP) (Prokop, Kubara)	3 – 2
	3 – 3	48:35 – Lassen
58:47 – Safar (Wudrick and Rummukainen)	4 – 3

12 min
Penalties
35 min
34
Shots
35

Goodall Cup final

28 August 2016; 15:00	CBR Brave	1–2 (0–1, 0–1, 1–0)	Newcastle North Stars	O'Brien Group Arena

Game reference

Aleksi Toivonen
Goalies
Dayne Davis
Referee:
Cory Ross
Linesmen:
Fraser Ohlson
Casper Russell-Huber

	0 – 1	13:02 – McLaughlin (Nadin)
	0 – 2	19:44 – Harris (Taylor)
32.51 – Wudrick (Safar, Blunden)	1 – 2

8 min
Penalties
8 min
29
Shots
31

== Player statistics ==
=== Skaters ===
Regular season
Nat	Player	Pos	M	G	A	P	PIM
(Canada)	Artem Bidlevskii	D	6	0	3	3	2
(Canada)	Stephen Blunden	F	14	20	17	37	99
(Australia)	Zach Boyle	D	27	1	8	9	10
(Switzerland)	Nicola Brandi	F	10	8	6	14	14
(Australia)	Jordon Brunt	F	6	0	0	0	0
(Australia)	Harrison Byers	F	19	1	2	3	108
(Australia)	James Byers	D	28	1	4	5	36
(Australia)	Timothy Cox	D	4	0	0	0	0
(Australia)	Jordie Gavin	F	13	0	1	1	20
(Australia)	Matthew Gilpin	F	4	0	0	0	0
(Canada)	Mathieu Guertin	F	20	18	31	49	86
(Canada)	Matthew Harvey	D	15	0	9	9	18
(Australia)	Mitchell Henning	F	26	1	3	4	6
(United States)	Ryan Johnson	F	19	1	1	2	70
(Australia)	Casey Kubara	F	27	16	33	49	24
(Australia)	Tyler Kubara	F	22	8	14	22	14
(Australia)	Thomas Letki	F	10	0	0	0	0
(Australia)	Matti Luoma	F	10	2	5	7	2
(Australia)	Kai Miettinen	F	28	5	6	11	32
(Australia)	Luke Moore	D	20	0	0	0	0
(Australia)	Luke Philps	F	17	0	0	0	0
(Canada)	Neal Prokop	F	20	16	14	30	8
(Australia)	Mark Rummukainen	D	25	2	6	8	18
(Czech Republic)	Jan Safar	D	17	7	25	32	61
(Canada)	Geordie Wudrick	F	20	20	30	50	34

Finals
Nat	Player	Pos	M	G	A	P	PIM
(Canada)	Artem Bidlevskii	D	0	0	0	0	0
(Canada)	Stephen Blunden	F	1	0	1	1	2
(Australia)	Zach Boyle	D	2	0	0	0	0
(Switzerland)	Nicola Brandi	F	2	0	1	1	0
(Australia)	Jordon Brunt	F	0	0	0	0	0
(Australia)	Harrison Byers	F	2	0	0	0	0
(Australia)	James Byers	D	2	0	0	0	4
(Australia)	Timothy Cox	D	0	0	0	0	0
(Australia)	Jordie Gavin	F	2	0	0	0	2
(Australia)	Matthew Gilpin	F	0	0	0	0	0
(Canada)	Mathieu Guertin	F	0	0	0	0	0
(Canada)	Matthew Harvey	D	2	0	0	0	2
(Australia)	Mitchell Henning	F	0	0	0	0	0
(United States)	Ryan Johnson	F	0	0	0	0	0
(Australia)	Casey Kubara	F	2	0	1	1	2
(Australia)	Tyler Kubara	F	2	0	1	1	0
(Australia)	Thomas Letki	F	0	0	0	0	0
(Australia)	Matti Luoma	F	2	0	0	0	0
(Australia)	Kai Miettinen	F	2	0	1	1	0
(Australia)	Luke Moore	D	0	0	0	0	0
(Australia)	Luke Philps	F	0	0	0	0	0
(Canada)	Neal Prokop	F	1	0	1	1	0
(Australia)	Mark Rummukainen	D	2	0	1	1	0
(Czech Republic)	Jan Safar	D	2	2	2	4	2
(Canada)	Geordie Wudrick	F	2	3	1	4	6

=== Goaltenders ===
Regular season
Nat	Player	Pos	M	SO	MP	GA	GAA	SA	SV	SV%	G	A	PIM
(Australia)	Nickolas Eckhardt	G	0	-	-	-	-	-	-	-	-	-	-
(Australia)	Alex Tetreault	G	9	0	280	22	4.72	178	156	0.876	0	2	0
(Australia)	Aleksi Toivonen	G	24	0	1111	93	5.02	754	661	0.877	0	2	2

Finals
Nat	Player	Pos	M	SO	MP	GA	GAA	SA	SV	SV%	G	A	PIM
(Australia)	Nickolas Eckhardt	G	0	-	-	-	-	-	-	-	-	-	-
(Australia)	Alex Tetreault	G	0	-	-	-	-	-	-	-	-	-	-
(Australia)	Aleksi Toivonen	G	2	0	108	5	2.79	66	61	0.924	0	0	0

== Awards ==
Team awards for 2016 season

2016 Brave awards
Award	Recipient
Bravest of the Brave	(Czech Republic) Jan Safar (Canada) Mathieu Guertin
Best Forward	(Canada) Mathieu Guertin
Best Defenceman	(Czech Republic) Jan Safar
Fans Choice	(Australia) James Byers
Player's Choice	(Australia) Kai Miettinen
Coach's Award	*Not awarded
Emerging Brave	(Australia) Casey Kubara
John Lewis Memorial Award	(Australia) Andrew Deans (Australia) Judy Deans

AIHL awards for 2016 season

2016 AIHL awards
Award	Recipient
Rookie of the Year	(Australia) Casey Kubara
Local Player of the Year	(Australia) Casey Kubara
Defenseman of the Year	(Czech Republic) Jan Safar
