= 2016 AIHL season =

- League: Australian Ice Hockey League
- Sport: Ice hockey
- Duration: 23 April 2016 – 28 August 2016

Regular season
- H Newman Reid Trophy: Melbourne Ice (2nd title)
- Season MVP: Wehebe Darge (Adrenaline)
- Top scorer: Connor McLaughlin (61 points) (North Stars)

Goodall Cup
- Champions: Newcastle North Stars
- Runners-up: CBR Brave
- Finals MVP: Dayne Davis (North Stars)

AIHL seasons
- ← 2015 2017 →

The 2016 AIHL season was the 17th season of the Australian Ice Hockey League (AIHL). It ran from 23 April 2016 until 21 August 2016, with the Goodall Cup finals following on 27 and 28 August. The Melbourne Ice won the H Newman Reid Trophy after finishing the regular season with the most points. The Newcastle North Stars won the Goodall Cup for the second year in a row after defeating the CBR Brave in the final.

== Teams ==
In 2016 the AIHL had 8 teams competing in the league.

2016 AIHL teams
| Team | City | Arena | Head coach | Captain |
|---|---|---|---|---|
| Adelaide Adrenaline | (South Australia) Adelaide | IceArenA | (Australia) Trevor Walsh | (Australia) Greg Oddy |
| CBR Brave | (Australian Capital Territory) Canberra | Phillip Ice Skating Centre | (United States) Josh Unice | (Australia) Jordan Gavin |
| Melbourne Ice | (Victoria (state)) Melbourne | O'Brien Group Arena | (Australia) Brent Laver | (Australia) Lliam Webster |
| Melbourne Mustangs | (Victoria (state)) Melbourne | O'Brien Group Arena | (Australia) Michael Flaherty | (United States) Patrick O'Kane |
| Newcastle North Stars | (New South Wales) Newcastle | Hunter Ice Skating Stadium | (Australia) Andrew Petrie | (Australia) Robert Malloy |
| Perth Thunder | (Western Australia) Perth | Perth Ice Arena | (Australia) Dave Kenway | (Australia) Samuel Wilson |
| Sydney Bears | (New South Wales) Penrith | Penrith Ice Palace | (Australia) Ron Kuprowsky | (Australia) Michael Schlamp |
| Sydney Ice Dogs | (New South Wales) Sydney | Liverpool Catholic Club Ice Rink | (Australia) Vladimir Rubes | (Australia) Scott Stephenson |

== League business ==
In September 2015 it was announced that the Medibank Icehouse had been renamed the O'Brien Group Arena following a lease takeover by the O'Brien Catering Group. The league announced that the Sydney Bears will host two games against the Melbourne Ice in Queensland during the 2016 season. The games, promoted under the title of the Brisbane Battle, will be held at Iceworld Boondall and Iceworld Acacia Ridge on 14 and 15 May respectively. The AIHL have not held a game in Queensland since the suspension of the Gold Coast Blue Tongues in 2012. In February 2016 the Sydney Ice Dogs announced that Reach Crane Trucks had renewed their sponsorship for 2016, extending the original three-year deal that was signed in 2013. The Ice Dogs later signed TAFE SWSi Aboriginal Learning Circle as a new sponsor for the season. Also in February Hards Transport renewed their naming rights sponsorship of the Adelaide Adrenaline. The Adrenaline also signed new sponsors Reading Cinemas, Paxton Wines and Mortgage Choice Malvern and extended their deal with the Hilton Hotel's MyBar as their official post-game venue. In March 2016 the CBR Brave signed Casino Canberra and McDonald's ACT as major sponsors and Canberra Toyota as their vehicle sponsor. The CBR Brave also extended their deal with Anytime Fitness as the club's official gym partner and the Hellenic Club of Canberra as their post-game partner and renewed their sponsorship deal with Jordo's Chop Shop. On 21 March 2016 the Bears announced that they had formed a partnership with the Australian Defence Force Ice Hockey Association's Army Knights for 2016. This was followed by the CBR Brave forming a partnership with the Navy Tigersharks. Both partnerships aim to help promote ice hockey within the Defence Force and develop emerging talent. The Bears partnership deal also includes discounted tickets for Defence Force members during the season. The Sydney Bears have reached a deal with Hawkesbury Radio to broadcast at least two of their home games for the 2016 season while also continuing to broadcast via their normal Mixlr stream. The Perth Thunder will also start live broadcasting their home games via Mixlr for the 2016 season. In April the Brave announced a partnership with the Canberra Cavalry of the Australian Baseball League to help increase promotion between the two teams. On 22 April the Perth Thunder announced that they had signed Smooth Financial Services as a platinum sponsor for the 2016 season. In May 2016 Hi-Tec Oils renewed their major sponsorship with the Sydney Bears for the season. Also in May The James Hotel signed a deal with the Melbourne Mustangs to become a major sponsor and host the club's pre and post-game functions.

=== Exhibition games ===
On 31 March 2016 the Melbourne Ice and Melbourne Mustangs competed in an exhibition game at the O’Brien Group Arena with the Ice winning 5–1. The 2016 edition of the Wilson Cup was held in March and April 2016. The tournament featured the three New South Wales based clubs competing in a double round-robin before a final between the two top ranked teams. The Sydney Bears finished first in the round robin stage, winning three of their four games, and were drawn against the Sydney Ice Dogs in the final. The Bears won the final 3–1, claiming their third Wilson Cup title.

=== Personnel changes ===
In October 2015 it was announced that Vladimir Rubes had stepped down as head coach of the Sydney Bears due to family commitments. Rubes was replaced by assistant Ron Kuprowsky to the position of head coach. Kuprowsky was previously coach of the Sydney Ice Dogs before joining the Bears in 2015. Also in October the Sydney Ice Dogs announced their 2016 committee with Tim Flynn moving from the head coach position to the role of general manager, taking over the position from Anthony Wilson. Flynn's role as general manager for the Sydney Ice Dogs lasted until March 2016 with the club replacing him with former player Jason Juba. In November 2015 the Melbourne Mustangs announced that Brad Vigon had resigned from the position of head coach due to family commitments. Vigon was replaced by assistant coach Michael Flaherty with the Mustangs also adding former Australian national team players Damian Holland and Jon Moses as Flaherty's new assistant coaches. The Mustangs also announced that Andrew McDowell had stepped down from the position of Vice President in order to focus on his role of Director of Hockey Operations. He was replaced by Myles Harris.

In December 2015 the Adelaide Adrenaline announced that head coach Ryan O'Handley had stepped down from the position of head coach due to family commitments. O'Handley however moved into the positions of Vice President and Director of Hockey Operations at the club. A couple of weeks later the Adrenaline signed former AIHL and Australian national team player Trevor Walsh as O'Handley's replacement. Following the appointment of Walsh as head coach the Adrenaline also announced that Gordon Cochrane and Sami Mantere had been signed as assistant coaches for 2016. In March 2016 the Sydney Ice Dogs announced that they had signed former Sydney Bears head coach Vladimir Rubes to the position of head coach. Rubes stepped down from his position of head coach of the Sydney Bears in October 2015 citing family commitments. Also in March the CBR Brave re-signed head coach Josh Unice along with assistant coaches David Rogina and Stuart Philps for the 2016 season.

In June 2016 the Adrenaline relieved Trevor Walsh of his duties as head coach. He was replaced by former Australian national team assistant coach Eric Lien. On 17 August, three days before the final round of the regular season, the Brave announced that Josh Unice had resigned from his position of head coach due to a number of personal issues outside of hockey. He was replaced by the club's assistant coaches for the remainder of the season.

=== Player transfers ===
==== Interclub transfers ====
| Nat | Player | Previous team | New team | Ref |
|---|---|---|---|---|
| (Australia) | Zachary Boyle | Adelaide Adrenaline | CBR Brave | |
| (Australia) | Ellesse Carini | Sydney Bears | Sydney Ice Dogs | |
| (Australia) | David Dunwoodie | CBR Brave | Sydney Ice Dogs | |
| (Australia) | Brian Funes | Sydney Ice Dogs | Sydney Bears | |
| (Australia) | Sean Hamilton | Sydney Ice Dogs | Perth Thunder | |
| (Australia) | Joseph Hughes | Melbourne Mustangs | Melbourne Ice | |
| (Australia) | Tomas Manco | CBR Brave | Sydney Ice Dogs | |
| (Australia) | Joel Rhodes | Sydney Ice Dogs | Sydney Bears | |
| (Czech Republic) | Jan Safar | Newcastle North Stars | CBR Brave | |
| (Australia) | Charlie Smart | Adelaide Adrenaline | Sydney Ice Dogs | |
| (Australia) | Andrew White | Adelaide Adrenaline | Sydney Ice Dogs | |
| (Canada) | Geordie Wudrick | Newcastle North Stars | CBR Brave | |

==== Retirements ====
| Nat | Player | Team | New role | Ref |
|---|---|---|---|---|
| (Australia) | Vincent Hughes | Melbourne Mustangs | — | |
| (Australia) | Christopher Sekura | Sydney Ice Dogs | Assistant coach at Sydney Ice Dogs | |
| (Australia) | Robert Starke | Newcastle North Stars | — | |

==== New signings ====
| Nat | Player | Previous team | New team | Ref |
|---|---|---|---|---|
| (Canada) | Ryan Annesley | No team | Sydney Bears | |
| (Australia) | Brentin Azzopardi | Banff Academy Bears | Sydney Ice Dogs | |
| (Australia) | Phil Bakatsoulas | No team | Melbourne Mustangs | |
| (United States) | T.J. Battani | No team | Adelaide Adrenaline | |
| (Canada) | Jessyko Bernard | Concordia University | Perth Thunder | |
| (Canada) | Art Bidlevskii | Kallinge-Ronneby IF | CBR Brave | |
| (Switzerland) | Nicola Brandi | SC Rapperswil-Jona Lakers | CBR Brave | |
| (Canada) | Benjamin Breault | LHC Les Lions | Perth Thunder | |
| (Australia) | Russel Brewer | Adelaide Tigers | Adelaide Adrenaline | |
| (Australia) | Billy Cliff | No team | Sydney Bears | |
| (Australia) | Timothy Cox | No team | CBR Brave | |
| (Australia) | Zane Cunliffe | No team | Perth Thunder | |
| (United States) | Troy Davenport | No team | Melbourne Ice | |
| (United States) | Michael Dorr | Fife Flyers | Perth Thunder | |
| (Australia) | Ted Fabijan | Adelaide Blackhawks | Adelaide Adrenaline | |
| (Australia) | Lachlan Fahmy | Banff Academy Bears | Sydney Bears | |
| (Canada) | Zack Firlotte | Elsipogtog Hawks | Adelaide Adrenaline | |
| (Australia) | Luke Fisher | No team | Melbourne Mustangs | |
| (Australia) | Darcy Flanagan | Melbourne Glaciers | Melbourne Mustangs | |
| (Australia) | David Foster | Melbourne Glaciers | Melbourne Mustangs | |
| (Australia) | Jordan Geyer | Adelaide Falcons | Adelaide Adrenaline | |
| (Australia) | Matt Gilpin | No team | CBR Brave | |
| (Australia) | Per Daniel Göransson | Northern Vikings | Perth Thunder | |
| (Canada) | Brandon Greenside | Peoria Rivermen | Newcastle North Stars | |
| (Canada) | Mathieu Guertin | Trois-Rivières Blizzard | CBR Brave | |
| (United States) | Josh Harris | Peoria Rivermen | Newcastle North Stars | |
| (New Zealand) | Dale Harrop | Canterbury Red Devils | Perth Thunder | |
| (Canada) | Thomas Heemsherk | Bentley Generals | Perth Thunder | |
| (Australia) | Alex Henderson | Penrith Raptors | Sydney Bears | |
| (Australia) | Mitchell Henning | No team | CBR Brave | |
| (United States) | Mark Higgins | No team | Melbourne Mustangs | |
| (United Kingdom) | Jamie Holland | No team | Adelaide Adrenaline | |
| (Canada) | Geoff Irwin | No team | Sydney Bears | |
| (Canada) | James Isaacs | Coventry Blaze | Melbourne Mustangs | |
| (United States) | Nic Kawasaki | Penrith Raptors | Sydney Bears | |
| (Australia) | Anthony Kimlin | Whitby Dunlops | Sydney Bears | |
| (Australia) | Joshua Kleipas | Sydney Sting | Sydney Ice Dogs | |
| (Australia) | Bayley Kubara | Reach Rebels | Sydney Ice Dogs | |
| (Australia) | Casey Kubara | Atlanta Jr. Knights | CBR Brave | |
| (Denmark) | Lasse Lassen | No team | Melbourne Ice | |
| (Canada) | Bobby Lipsett | No team | Melbourne Ice | |
| (Canada) | Éric Louis-Seize | Royal Military College of Canada | Melbourne Mustangs | |
| (Australia) | Matti Luoma | No team | CBR Brave | |
| (Canada) | Cole MacMillan | University of Prince Edward Island | Adelaide Adrenaline | |
| (Australia) | David Mahood | Perth Pelicans | Perth Thunder | |
| (Australia) | Liam Manwarring | Sydney Sabres | Newcastle North Stars | |
| (Australia) | Marcel McGuiness | Adelaide Redwings | Adelaide Adrenaline | |
| (United States) | Connor McLaughlin | University of Alberta Augustana | Newcastle North Stars | |
| (United States) | Mike McMahon | No team | Melbourne Mustangs | |
| (Australia) | Ian Merwin | No team | Sydney Bears | |
| (Australia) | Nicholas Mizen | Las Vegas Storm | Newcastle North Stars | |
| (Australia) | Charlie Moore | No team | Melbourne Mustangs | |
| (Australia) | Luke Moore | No team | CBR Brave | |
| (Canada) | Gabriel O'Connor | Corsaires de Nantes | Adelaide Adrenaline | |
| (Australia) | Sam O'Neill-Hodges | No team | Adelaide Adrenaline | |
| (Australia) | Cian O'Reilly | Blueline Bombers | Sydney Ice Dogs | |
| (Australia) | Dion Palmer | Adelaide Redwings | Adelaide Adrenaline | |
| (Australia) | Dathan Pleiter | Perth Pelicans | Perth Thunder | |
| (Australia) | Luke Philps | No team | CBR Brave | |
| (Canada) | Neal Prokop | No team | CBR Brave | |
| (Australia) | Jake Riley | Adelaide Penguins | Adelaide Adrenaline | |
| (Australia) | Gabriel Roblebo | Sydney Sting | Sydney Bears | |
| (New Zealand) | Ryan Ruddle | No team | Melbourne Mustangs | |
| (Sweden) | Jonatan Ruth | No team | Newcastle North Stars | |
| (New Zealand) | Remy Sandoy | West Auckland Admirals | Sydney Ice Dogs | |
| (Slovenia) | David Sefic | SKHL Crvena Zvezda | Melbourne Mustangs | |
| (Australia) | Chris Slauenwhite | Hamilton Steelhawks | Melbourne Mustangs | |
| (Australia) | Cam Smith | Army Knights | Sydney Bears | |
| (Australia) | Tim Stanger | Newcastle North Stars ECSL | Newcastle North Stars | |
| (Czech Republic) | Petr Stepanek | HC Zdar nad Sazavou | Sydney Ice Dogs | |
| (Australia) | Scott Stephenson | No team | Sydney Ice Dogs | |
| (Australia) | Todd Stephenson | No team | Sydney Ice Dogs | |
| (Australia) | Thomas Steven | Green Bay Jr. Gamblers U18 | Melbourne Mustangs | |
| (United Kingdom) | Paul Swindlehurst | Manchester Storm | Sydney Ice Dogs | |
| (Australia) | Matt Taylor | Newcastle North Stars ECSL | Newcastle North Stars | |
| (Canada) | Grant Toulmin | Manchester Storm | Sydney Ice Dogs | |
| (Australia) | Byron Tschuma | Melbourne Whalers | Melbourne Mustangs | |
| (Canada) | Brent Vandenberg | Dundas Real McCoys | Sydney Bears | |
| (Australia) | Jeremy Vasquez | CIHA White Midget AAA | Sydney Bears | |
| (Australia) | Nicholas Weiland | Bridgton Academy 18U | Sydney Ice Dogs | |
| (Canada) | Brandon Wong | Indy Fuel | Newcastle North Stars | |
| (Japan) | Chris Yule | No team | Melbourne Ice | |
| (Australia) | Andrey Zolotarev | Adelaide Falcons | Adelaide Adrenaline | |

==== Players lost ====
| Nat | Player | Previous team | New team | Ref |
|---|---|---|---|---|
| (United States) | Drew Akins | Melbourne Mustangs | No team | |
| (Canada) | Corey Banfield | Melbourne Mustangs | Pensacola Ice Flyers | |
| (Australia) | Alan Becken | Sydney Bears | Blueline Bombers | |
| (Australia) | Jan Bejcek | Sydney Bears | No team | |
| (Australia) | Jamie Blazevic | Sydney Ice Dogs | No team | |
| (Australia) | Paul Bond | Sydney Bears | No team | |
| (United Kingdom) | Jonathan Boxill | Adelaide Adrenaline | Belfast Giants | |
| (Australia) | Joshua Broekman | Newcastle North Stars | No team | |
| (Australia) | Jeremy Brown | Melbourne Ice | Chambly Forts | |
| (Australia) | Dale Burgess | Sydney Bears | Penrith Raptors | |
| (Australia) | Aaron Clayworth | CBR Brave | No team | |
| (Australia) | Ethan Cornford | Melbourne Mustangs | Tottenham Steam | |
| (Canada) | Luc Daigneault | Perth Thunder | No team | |
| (Australia) | Riccardo Del Basso | Perth Thunder | No team | |
| (Australia) | Andrew Fitzgerald | Melbourne Mustangs | No team | |
| (Australia) | Ben Gebert | Adelaide Adrenaline | No team | |
| (Canada) | Kelly Geoffrey | CBR Brave | Aigles de La Roche sur Yon | |
| (Sweden) | Viktor Gibbs Sjödin | Melbourne Mustangs | No team | |
| (Canada) | Mike Giorgi | CBR Brave | No team | |
| (Australia) | Andrew Glass | Adelaide Adrenaline | No team | |
| (Australia) | Kaden Goulds | Perth Thunder | Cockburn Whitehawks | |
| (United States) | Jeff Grant | Melbourne Mustangs | No team | |
| (United States) | Matt Grogan | Sydney Ice Dogs | Mississippi RiverKings | |
| (Canada) | Tyler Grove | Adelaide Adrenaline | No team | |
| (United States) | Mark Guggenberger | Perth Thunder | DVTK Jegesmedvék | |
| (United States) | Joseph Harcharik | Sydney Bears | Sollentuna HC | |
| (Australia) | Luke Harding | Adelaide Adrenaline | No team | |
| (Canada) | Kory Helowka | Adelaide Adrenaline | Danbury Titans | |
| (Australia) | Mackenzie Hill | Melbourne Ice | No team | |
| (United States) | Alex Hudson | Perth Thunder | Louisiana IceGators | |
| (Australia) | Greg Hyde | Perth Thunder | No team | |
| (Australia) | Michael James | Melbourne Mustangs | No team | |
| (Czech Republic) | Kamil Jarina | Sydney Bears | No team | |
| (Sweden) | Tim Johansson | Melbourne Ice | Sölvesborgs IK | |
| (Finland) | Toni Kluuskeri | Perth Thunder | Narvik IK | |
| (Australia) | Jackson Knott | Sydney Ice Dogs | Parry Sound Islanders | |
| (Australia) | Jake Knott | Sydney Ice Dogs | Parry Sound Islanders | |
| (Canada) | Paul Kurceba | Melbourne Ice | No team | |
| (Canada) | Alex Leclerc | Melbourne Ice | Lloydminster Bobcats | |
| (Australia) | Mitchell Levitt | Perth Thunder | No team | |
| (Australia) | David Lewis | CBR Brave | No team | |
| (Australia) | Jayden Lewis | CBR Brave | No team | |
| (Canada) | Kyle Mariani | CBR Brave | Bouquetins de Val Vanoise | |
| (Australia) | James Marino | Sydney Ice Dogs | Bridgton Academy 18U | |
| (Australia) | Shannon McGregor | Sydney Ice Dogs | No team | |
| (United States) | Luke Moffatt | Newcastle North Stars | HC Gherdëina | |
| (Australia) | Alan Moss | Melbourne Mustangs | No team | |
| (Czech Republic) | Aleš Padělek | Sydney Bears | Peterborough Phantoms | |
| (Australia) | Ben Pagett | CBR Brave | No team | |
| (Australia) | Thomas Papps | Adelaide Adrenaline | No team | |
| (United States) | Mario Passarelli | Sydney Ice Dogs | No team | |
| (Canada) | Jordan Peddle | CBR Brave | Terrace River Kings | |
| (Canada) | Scott Pitt | CBR Brave | Braehead Clan | |
| (Australia) | Ryan Remillard | Adelaide Adrenaline | No team | |
| (Australia) | Alain Riesen | CBR Brave | No team | |
| (Australia) | David Ruck | Perth Thunder | No team | |
| (Australia) | Hayden Sheard | Newcastle North Stars | Newcastle North Stars ECSL | |
| (United States) | Ryan Strayer | Sydney Ice Dogs | Southern Stampede | |
| (Australia) | Peter Taylor | CBR Brave | No team | |
| (Australia) | Marco Tomasello | Sydney Ice Dogs | No team | |
| (United States) | Josh Unice | CBR Brave | No team | |
| (Australia) | Aaron Widger | Adelaide Adrenaline | No team | |
| (Australia) | Stuart Woodall | CBR Brave | No team | |
| (Australia) | Bradley Young | Perth Thunder | No team | |

== Regular season ==
The regular season is set to start on 23 April 2016 and run through to 21 August 2016 before the top four teams advance to compete in the Goodall Cup playoff series. A weeks break will be held in June to accommodate the All-Star Weekend which is scheduled for 11 and 12 June 2016 in Penrith, New South Wales. The AIHL will hold their first games in Queensland since 2012 after they announced that the Sydney Bears and Melbourne Ice will compete in a double header in Brisbane. The games, promoted under the title of the Brisbane Battle, will be held at Ice World Boondall and Iceworld Acacia Ridge on 14 and 15 May respectively.

In March 2016 it was reported that the Adelaide Ice Arena had to close their large ice surface for repairs following failed pressure tests. The repairs resulted in the league pushing back the start Adrenaline's home season from 23 April to 15 May and rescheduling of four games. Game 1 between the North Stars and Adrenaline at the Adelaide Ice Arena was pushed back to 17 July from its original date of 23 April. Game 81 between the Thunder and the North Stars at the Perth Ice Arena was moved forward into the vacant 23 April slot after originally being scheduled for 17 July. The double header between the Adrenaline and the Thunder at the Adelaide Ice Arena was also pushed back from its original date of 30 April and 1 May to 21 and 22 May. On 5 June Game 48 between the Sydney Ice Dogs and Melbourne Mustangs was postponed due to flooding at the Liverpool Catholic Club Ice Rink. The match was later rescheduled for 7 August at the same venue.

25 June game between the Melbourne Ice and Sydney Bears served as the third annual Canada Day Classic match. The Bears won the game 4–3 following a shootout to claim the title for the third straight year. On 6 August the Sydney Ice Dogs hosted the Adelaide Adrenaline in the Matt Clark Memorial Game, part of the clubs Leukaemia fundraising night. The Ice Dogs wore the old Warringah Bombers jersey, dedicated to former Bombers player Matt Clark who died from leukaemia in 1995. The Ice Dogs won the game 9–8. 13 August match between the Adelaide Adrenaline and CBR Brave served as the second annual beyondblue Cup, setup to help raise awareness for the charity. The Brave won the Cup for the second year in a row, defeating the Adrenaline 5–4 following a shootout.

The Melbourne Ice won the H Newman Reid Trophy after finishing first in the regular season with 66 points. Following the end of the season the AIHL announced the winners of the 2016 awards. Adelaide Adrenaline's Wehebe Darge won the Most Valuable Player and Anthony Kimlin of the Sydney Bears won the Goaltender of the Year. The CBR Brave's Jan Safar won the Defenceman of the Year and Casey Kubara was awarded both the Rookie of the Year and Local Player of the Year. The Melbourne Ice's Brent Laver was named Coach of the Year.

=== April ===
| Game | Date | Time | Away | Score | Home | Location | Attendance | Recap |
|---|---|---|---|---|---|---|---|---|
| 81 | 23 April | 16:30 | Newcastle North Stars | 3 – 2 (SO) | Perth Thunder | Perth Ice Arena | | |
| 2 | 23 April | 19:00 | Melbourne Mustangs | 0–3 | Melbourne Ice | O'Brien Group Arena | | |
| 3 | 23 April | 17:00 | Sydney Ice Dogs | 2–5 | CBR Brave | Phillip Ice Skating Centre | | |
| 4 | 24 April | 16:30 | Newcastle North Stars | 2–1 | Perth Thunder | Perth Ice Arena | | |
| 5 | 24 April | 17:00 | CBR Brave | 6–3 | Sydney Bears | Penrith Ice Palace | | |
| 7 | 30 April | 17:00 | CBR Brave | 4–2 | Melbourne Mustangs | O'Brien Group Arena | | |
| 8 | 30 April | 17:00 | Melbourne Ice | 7–1 | Sydney Ice Dogs | Liverpool Catholic Club Ice Rink | 500 | |

=== May ===
| Game | Date | Time | Away | Score | Home | Location | Attendance | Recap |
|---|---|---|---|---|---|---|---|---|
| 10 | 1 May | 16:00 | CBR Brave | 1–7 | Melbourne Mustangs | O'Brien Group Arena | | |
| 11 | 1 May | 16:00 | Melbourne Ice | 3 – 2 (SO) | Newcastle North Stars | Hunter Ice Skating Stadium | | |
| 12 | 1 May | 17:00 | Sydney Ice Dogs | 6–2 | Sydney Bears | Penrith Ice Palace | | |
| 13 | 7 May | 16:30 | Melbourne Mustangs | 0–1 | Perth Thunder | Perth Ice Arena | | |
| 14 | 7 May | 17:00 | Adelaide Adrenaline | 4 – 5 (SO) | Melbourne Ice | O'Brien Group Arena | | |
| 15 | 7 May | 17:00 | Newcastle North Stars | 9–1 | Sydney Ice Dogs | Liverpool Catholic Club Ice Rink | | |
| 16 | 7 May | 17:00 | Sydney Bears | 3 – 2 (SO) | CBR Brave | Phillip Ice Skating Centre | | |
| 17 | 8 May | 16:00 | Adelaide Adrenaline | 2–6 | Melbourne Ice | O'Brien Group Arena | | |
| 18 | 8 May | 16:30 | Melbourne Mustangs | 1–5 | Perth Thunder | Perth Ice Arena | | |
| 19 | 8 May | 17:00 | Sydney Bears | 3 – 4 (SO) | Sydney Ice Dogs | Liverpool Catholic Club Ice Rink | | |
| 20 | 8 May | 17:00 | CBR Brave | 4 – 3 (SO) | Newcastle North Stars | Hunter Ice Skating Stadium | | |
| 21 | 14 May | 16:00 | Melbourne Ice | 3 – 2 (SO) | Sydney Bears | Ice World Boondall | 600 | |
| 22 | 14 May | 16:30 | Sydney Ice Dogs | 2–3 | Adelaide Adrenaline | Adelaide Ice Arena | | |
| 23 | 14 May | 17:00 | Newcastle North Stars | 8–2 | Melbourne Mustangs | O'Brien Group Arena | | |
| 24 | 14 May | 17:30 | Perth Thunder | 6–2 | CBR Brave | Phillip Ice Skating Centre | | |
| 25 | 15 May | 15:30 | Melbourne Ice | 3–1 | Sydney Bears | Ice World Acacia Ridge | | |
| 26 | 15 May | 16:00 | Sydney Ice Dogs | 3–6 | Adelaide Adrenaline | Adelaide Ice Arena | | |
| 27 | 15 May | 16:00 | Newcastle North Stars | 2–5 | Melbourne Mustangs | O'Brien Group Arena | | |
| 28 | 15 May | 17:00 | Perth Thunder | 7–6 | CBR Brave | Phillip Ice Skating Centre | | |
| 29 | 19 May | 20:00 | Melbourne Mustangs | 2–7 | Melbourne Ice | O'Brien Group Arena | | |
| 6 | 21 April | 16:30 | Perth Thunder | 3–2 | Adelaide Adrenaline | Adelaide Ice Arena | | |
| 30 | 21 May | 17:00 | Sydney Ice Dogs | 1–3 | Melbourne Ice | O'Brien Group Arena | | |
| 31 | 21 May | 17:00 | Newcastle North Stars | 6–4 | Sydney Bears | Penrith Ice Palace | | |
| 32 | 22 May | 16:00 | Sydney Ice Dogs | 6–4 | Melbourne Mustangs | O'Brien Group Arena | | |
| 9 | 22 May | 16:30 | Perth Thunder | 4–3 | Adelaide Adrenaline | Adelaide Ice Arena | | |
| 33 | 22 May | 17:00 | CBR Brave | 2–7 | Newcastle North Stars | Hunter Ice Skating Stadium | | |
| 34 | 28 May | 16:30 | Melbourne Ice | 4 – 5 (SO) | Perth Thunder | Perth Ice Arena | | |
| 35 | 28 May | 17:00 | Adelaide Adrenaline | 2–4 | Melbourne Mustangs | O'Brien Group Arena | | |
| 36 | 28 May | 17:00 | Sydney Bears | 4 – 3 (SO) | Sydney Ice Dogs | Liverpool Catholic Club Ice Rink | | |
| 37 | 28 May | 17:30 | Newcastle North Stars | 3–5 | CBR Brave | Phillip Ice Skating Centre | | |
| 38 | 29 May | 16:00 | Adelaide Adrenaline | 3 – 4 (SO) | Melbourne Mustangs | O'Brien Group Arena | | |
| 39 | 29 May | 16:30 | Melbourne Ice | 4 – 5 (SO) | Perth Thunder | Perth Ice Arena | | |
| 40 | 29 May | 17:00 | Sydney Ice Dogs | 6–4 | Newcastle North Stars | Hunter Ice Skating Stadium | | |
| 41 | 29 May | 17:00 | Sydney Bears | 4–6 | CBR Brave | Phillip Ice Skating Centre | | |

=== June ===
| Game | Date | Time | Away | Score | Home | Location | Attendance | Recap |
|---|---|---|---|---|---|---|---|---|
| 42 | 4 June | 16:30 | Sydney Bears | 6–2 | Adelaide Adrenaline | Adelaide Ice Arena | | |
| 43 | 4 June | 17:00 | CBR Brave | 5–7 | Melbourne Ice | O'Brien Group Arena | | |
| 44 | 4 June | 17:00 | Melbourne Mustangs | 5–4 | Newcastle North Stars | Hunter Ice Skating Stadium | | |
| 45 | 4 June | 17:00 | Perth Thunder | 3–2 | Sydney Ice Dogs | Liverpool Catholic Club Ice Rink | | |
| 46 | 5 June | 16:00 | CBR Brave | 3–6 | Melbourne Ice | O'Brien Group Arena | | |
| 47 | 5 June | 16:00 | Sydney Bears | 4 – 3 (SO) | Adelaide Adrenaline | Adelaide Ice Arena | | |
| 49 | 5 June | 17:00 | Perth Thunder | 2–3 | Newcastle North Stars | Hunter Ice Skating Stadium | | |
| 50 | 18 June | 16:30 | Adelaide Adrenaline | 3–1 | Perth Thunder | Perth Ice Arena | | |
| 51 | 18 June | 17:00 | Melbourne Ice | 3–2 | Newcastle North Stars | Hunter Ice Skating Stadium | | |
| 52 | 18 June | 17:30 | Melbourne Mustangs | 2–5 | CBR Brave | Phillip Ice Skating Centre | | |
| 53 | 19 June | 16:30 | Adelaide Adrenaline | 3–6 | Perth Thunder | Perth Ice Arena | | |
| 54 | 19 June | 17:00 | Melbourne Mustangs | 1–4 | CBR Brave | Phillip Ice Skating Centre | | |
| 55 | 19 June | 17:00 | Newcastle North Stars | 1 – 2 (SO) | Sydney Bears | Penrith Ice Palace | | |
| 56 | 19 June | 17:00 | Melbourne Ice | 8–1 | Sydney Ice Dogs | Liverpool Catholic Club Ice Rink | | |
| 57 | 25 June | 17:00 | Sydney Bears | 4 – 3 (SO) | Melbourne Ice | O'Brien Group Arena | | |
| 58 | 25 June | 17:00 | Sydney Ice Dogs | 1–5 | Newcastle North Stars | Hunter Ice Skating Stadium | | |
| 59 | 26 June | 16:00 | Sydney Bears | 2–4 | Melbourne Mustangs | O'Brien Group Arena | | |
| 60 | 26 June | 17:00 | Newcastle North Stars | 5–2 | Sydney Ice Dogs | Liverpool Catholic Club Ice Rink | | |

=== July ===
| Game | Date | Time | Away | Score | Home | Location | Attendance | Recap |
|---|---|---|---|---|---|---|---|---|
| 61 | 2 July | 16:30 | Melbourne Ice | 9–1 | Adelaide Adrenaline | Adelaide Ice Arena | | |
| 62 | 2 July | 17:00 | Perth Thunder | 1–2 | Melbourne Mustangs | O'Brien Group Arena | | |
| 63 | 2 July | 17:00 | Sydney Ice Dogs | 4–5 | Sydney Bears | Penrith Ice Palace | | |
| 64 | 2 July | 17:30 | Newcastle North Stars | 3–1 | CBR Brave | Phillip Ice Skating Centre | | |
| 65 | 3 July | 16:00 | Perth Thunder | 6–3 | Melbourne Mustangs | O'Brien Group Arena | | |
| 66 | 3 July | 16:00 | Melbourne Ice | 3–2 | Adelaide Adrenaline | Adelaide Ice Arena | | |
| 67 | 3 July | 17:00 | CBR Brave | 6–1 | Sydney Ice Dogs | Liverpool Catholic Club Ice Rink | | |
| 68 | 3 July | 17:00 | Sydney Bears | 3–0 | Newcastle North Stars | Hunter Ice Skating Stadium | | |
| 69 | 9 July | 16:30 | CBR Brave | 3 – 4 (SO) | Perth Thunder | Perth Ice Arena | | |
| 70 | 9 July | 17:00 | Newcastle North Stars | 3–2 | Melbourne Ice | O'Brien Group Arena | | |
| 71 | 9 July | 17:00 | Melbourne Mustangs | 4–3 | Sydney Bears | Penrith Ice Palace | | |
| 72 | 9 July | 17:00 | Adelaide Adrenaline | 5–4 | Sydney Ice Dogs | Liverpool Catholic Club Ice Rink | | |
| 73 | 10 July | 16:00 | Newcastle North Stars | 2–3 | Melbourne Ice | O'Brien Group Arena | | |
| 74 | 10 July | 16:30 | CBR Brave | 4–2 | Perth Thunder | Perth Ice Arena | | |
| 75 | 10 July | 17:00 | Adelaide Adrenaline | 3 – 2 (SO) | Sydney Bears | Penrith Ice Palace | | |
| 76 | 10 July | 17:00 | Melbourne Mustangs | 8–3 | Sydney Ice Dogs | Liverpool Catholic Club Ice Rink | | |
| 77 | 16 July | 16:30 | Newcastle North Stars | 3–2 | Adelaide Adrenaline | Adelaide Ice Arena | | |
| 78 | 16 July | 17:00 | Sydney Bears | 3–1 | Melbourne Mustangs | O'Brien Group Arena | | |
| 79 | 16 July | 17:30 | Sydney Ice Dogs | 5–6 | CBR Brave | Phillip Ice Skating Centre | | |
| 80 | 17 July | 16:00 | Sydney Bears | 1–4 | Melbourne Ice | O'Brien Group Arena | | |
| 1 | 17 July | 16:30 | Newcastle North Stars | 2–1 | Adelaide Adrenaline | Adelaide Ice Arena | | |
| 82 | 23 July | 19:00 | Melbourne Ice | 3–1 | Melbourne Mustangs | O'Brien Group Arena | | |
| 83 | 23 July | 17:00 | Perth Thunder | 4–2 | Sydney Bears | Penrith Ice Palace | | |
| 84 | 23 July | 17:30 | Adelaide Adrenaline | 2–7 | CBR Brave | Phillip Ice Skating Centre | | |
| 85 | 24 July | 17:00 | Perth Thunder | 1–3 | Sydney Ice Dogs | Liverpool Catholic Club Ice Rink | | |
| 86 | 24 July | 17:00 | Adelaide Adrenaline | 5–8 | CBR Brave | Phillip Ice Skating Centre | | |
| 87 | 30 July | 16:30 | Melbourne Mustangs | 5–3 | Adelaide Adrenaline | Adelaide Ice Arena | | |
| 88 | 30 July | 16:30 | Sydney Ice Dogs | 2–3 | Perth Thunder | Perth Ice Arena | | |
| 89 | 30 July | 17:00 | Sydney Bears | 2–5 | Newcastle North Stars | Hunter Ice Skating Stadium | | |
| 90 | 31 July | 16:00 | Melbourne Mustangs | 3–2 | Adelaide Adrenaline | Adelaide Ice Arena | | |
| 91 | 31 July | 16:30 | Sydney Ice Dogs | 2–6 | Perth Thunder | Perth Ice Arena | | |
| 92 | 31 July | 17:00 | CBR Brave | 6–4 | Sydney Bears | Penrith Ice Palace | | |

=== August ===
| Game | Date | Time | Away | Score | Home | Location | Attendance | Recap |
|---|---|---|---|---|---|---|---|---|
| 93 | 6 August | 17:00 | Adelaide Adrenaline | 8–9 | Sydney Ice Dogs | Liverpool Catholic Club Ice Rink | | |
| 94 | 6 August | 17:00 | Perth Thunder | 4 – 3 (SO) | Newcastle North Stars | Hunter Ice Skating Stadium | | |
| 95 | 6 August | 17:30 | Melbourne Ice | 10–9 | CBR Brave | Phillip Ice Skating Centre | | |
| 48 | 7 August | 17:00 | Melbourne Mustangs | 2–4 | Sydney Ice Dogs | Liverpool Catholic Club Ice Rink | | |
| 96 | 7 August | 17:00 | Perth Thunder | 4–3 | Sydney Bears | Penrith Ice Palace | | |
| 97 | 7 August | 17:00 | Melbourne Ice | 3–4 | CBR Brave | Phillip Ice Skating Centre | | |
| 98 | 7 August | 17:00 | Adelaide Adrenaline | 1–4 | Newcastle North Stars | Hunter Ice Skating Stadium | | |
| 99 | 11 August | 20:00 | Melbourne Ice | 4–1 | Melbourne Mustangs | O'Brien Group Arena | | |
| 100 | 13 August | 16:30 | Sydney Bears | 0–2 | Perth Thunder | Perth Ice Arena | | |
| 101 | 13 August | 16:30 | CBR Brave | 5 – 4 (SO) | Adelaide Adrenaline | Adelaide Ice Arena | | |
| 102 | 13 August | 17:00 | Sydney Ice Dogs | 7–10 | Melbourne Mustangs | O'Brien Group Arena | | |
| 103 | 14 August | 16:00 | CBR Brave | 6–5 | Adelaide Adrenaline | Adelaide Ice Arena | | |
| 104 | 14 August | 16:00 | Sydney Ice Dogs | 1–4 | Melbourne Ice | O'Brien Group Arena | | |
| 105 | 14 August | 16:30 | Sydney Bears | 1–2 | Perth Thunder | Perth Ice Arena | | |
| 106 | 20 August | 17:00 | Perth Thunder | 4–2 | Melbourne Ice | O'Brien Group Arena | | |
| 107 | 20 August | 17:00 | Melbourne Mustangs | 1–2 | Sydney Bears | Penrith Ice Palace | | |
| 108 | 20 August | 17:00 | Adelaide Adrenaline | 0–7 | Newcastle North Stars | Hunter Ice Skating Stadium | | |
| 109 | 20 August | 17:00 | CBR Brave | 4–6 | Sydney Ice Dogs | Liverpool Catholic Club Ice Rink | | |
| 110 | 21 August | 16:00 | Perth Thunder | 2–5 | Melbourne Ice | O'Brien Group Arena | | |
| 111 | 21 August | 16:00 | Melbourne Mustangs | 5 – 4 (SO) | Newcastle North Stars | Hunter Ice Skating Stadium | | |
| 112 | 21 August | 17:00 | Adelaide Adrenaline | 3–2 | Sydney Bears | Penrith Ice Palace | | |

=== Standings ===
| Team | GP | W | SOW | SOL | L | GF | GA | GDF | PTS |
|---|---|---|---|---|---|---|---|---|---|
| Melbourne Ice | 28 | 19 | 3 | 3 | 3 | 127 | 71 | +56 | 66 |
| Perth Thunder | 28 | 16 | 4 | 1 | 7 | 96 | 73 | +23 | 57 |
| Newcastle North Stars | 28 | 15 | 1 | 5 | 7 | 105 | 74 | +31 | 52 |
| CBR Brave | 28 | 15 | 2 | 2 | 9 | 129 | 117 | +12 | 51 |
| Melbourne Mustangs | 28 | 11 | 2 | 0 | 15 | 89 | 102 | −13 | 37 |
| Sydney Bears | 28 | 5 | 5 | 3 | 15 | 77 | 95 | −18 | 28 |
| Sydney Ice Dogs | 28 | 7 | 1 | 1 | 19 | 92 | 139 | −47 | 24 |
| Adelaide Adrenaline | 28 | 5 | 1 | 4 | 18 | 83 | 127 | −44 | 21 |

| Qualified for the Goodall Cup playoffs | H Newman Reid Trophy winners |

=== Statistics ===
==== Scoring leaders ====
List shows the ten top skaters sorted by points, then goals.

| Player | Team | GP | G | A | Pts | PIM | POS |
|---|---|---|---|---|---|---|---|
| Connor McLaughlin | Newcastle North Stars | 28 | 35 | 26 | 61 | 34 | F |
| Benjamin Breault | Perth Thunder | 28 | 26 | 26 | 52 | 20 | F |
| Wehebe Darge | Adelaide Adrenaline | 28 | 20 | 32 | 52 | 22 | F |
| Michael Dorr | Perth Thunder | 28 | 20 | 31 | 51 | 16 | F |
| Geordie Wudrick | CBR Brave | 20 | 20 | 30 | 50 | 34 | F |
| Mathieu Guertin | CBR Brave | 20 | 18 | 31 | 49 | 86 | F |
| Casey Kubara | CBR Brave | 27 | 16 | 33 | 49 | 24 | F |
| Jason Baclig | Melbourne Ice | 28 | 24 | 24 | 48 | 39 | F |
| Jessyko Bernard | Perth Thunder | 26 | 17 | 27 | 44 | 61 | F |
| Strat Allen | Sydney Ice Dogs | 25 | 16 | 27 | 43 | 30 | F |

==== Leading goaltenders ====
Only the top five goaltenders, based on save percentage with a minimum 40% of the team's ice time.

| Player | Team | MIP | SOG | GA | GAA | SVS% | SO |
|---|---|---|---|---|---|---|---|
| Thomas Heemskerk | Perth Thunder | 1347 | 905 | 66 | 2.45 | 0.927 | 2 |
| Troy Davenport | Melbourne Ice | 1084 | 543 | 45 | 2.08 | 0.917 | 1 |
| Anthony Kimlin | Sydney Bears | 1138 | 766 | 70 | 3.08 | 0.909 | 1 |
| Dayne Davis | Newcastle North Stars | 1218 | 632 | 60 | 2.46 | 0.905 | 0 |
| Fraser Carson | Melbourne Mustangs | 781 | 438 | 49 | 3.14 | 0.888 | 0 |

=== Season awards ===
Below lists the 2016 AIHL regular season award winners.

| Award | Name | Team |
|---|---|---|
| MVP | (Australia) Wehebe Darge | Adelaide Adrenaline |
| Goaltender | (Australia) Anthony Kimlin | Sydney Bears |
| Defenceman | (Czech Republic) Jan Safar | Newcastle North Stars |
| Rookie | (Australia) Casey Kubara | CBR Brave |
| Local player | (Australia) Casey Kubara | CBR Brave |
| Coach | (Australia) Brent Laver | Melbourne Ice |

== Goodall Cup playoffs ==
The 2016 playoffs started on 27 August 2016 with the Goodall Cup final being held on 28 August. Following the end of the regular season the top four teams advanced to the playoff series. All three games were held at the O'Brien Group Arena in Docklands, Victoria, the home of the Melbourne Ice and Melbourne Mustangs. The series was a single game elimination with the two winning semi-finalists advancing to the Goodall Cup final. The finals were again sponsored by Air Canada, their fourth year in a row. The Goodall Cup was won by the Newcastle North Stars (6th title) who defeated the CBR Brave 2–1 in regular time. North Stars' goaltender Dayne Davis was named the finals Most Valuable Player.

Semifinals
1 | Melbourne Ice | 3
4 | CBR Brave | 4*
3 | Newcastle North Stars | 3*
2 | Perth Thunder | 2

Final
CBR Brave | 1
Newcastle North Stars | 2

* denotes number of overtime periods

=== Semi-finals ===
All times are UTC+10:00

| 27 August 2016; 15:00 | CBR Brave | 4 – 3 OT (1–1, 1–1, 1–1, 1–0) | Melbourne Ice | O'Brien Group Arena |

Game reference

Aleksi Toivonen
Goalies
Troy Davenport
Referee:
Jeff Scott
Linesmen:
Fraser Ohlson
Casper Russell-Huber

| 2:43 – Safar (PP) (T. Kubara, Miettinen) | 1 – 0 |
| | 1 – 1 | 13:27 – Lassen (PP) (Graham, Armstrong) |
| | 1 – 2 | 26:01 – Hughes (Baclig, Yule) |
| 29:47 – Wudrick (PP) (Safar, Brandi) | 2 – 2 |
| 44:31 – Wudrick (PP) (Prokop, Kubara) | 3 – 2 |
| | 3 – 3 | 48:35 – Lassen |
| 58:47 – Safar (Wudrick and Rummukainen) | 4 – 3 |

12 min
Penalties
35 min
34
Shots
35

| 27 August 2016; 18:00 | Newcastle North Stars | 3 – 2 OT (1–1, 0–1, 1–0, 1–0) | Perth Thunder | O'Brien Group Arena |

Game reference

Dayne Davis
Goalies
Thomas Heemskerk
Referee:
Cory Ross
Linesmen:
Kent Unwin
Christopher Parks

| | 0 – 1 | 6:09 – Cox (Dorr) |
| 12:41 – Swiston (SH) (McLaughlin) | 1 – 1 |
| | 1 – 2 | 26:12 – Breault (Bernard, Dorr) |
| 42:25 – Swiston (Harris) | 2 – 2 |
| 60:01 – Powell (Greenside) | 3 – 2 |

4 min
Penalties
2 min
45
Shots
27

=== Final ===
| 28 August 2016; 15:00 | CBR Brave | 1–2 (0–1, 0–1, 1–0) | Newcastle North Stars | O'Brien Group Arena |

Game reference

Aleksi Toivonen
Goalies
Dayne Davis
Referee:
Cory Ross
Linesmen:
Fraser Ohlson
Casper Russell-Huber

| | 0 – 1 | 13:02 – McLaughlin (Nadin) |
| | 0 – 2 | 19:44 – Harris (Taylor) |
| 32.51 – Wudrick (Safar, Blunden) | 1 – 2 |

8 min
Penalties
8 min
29
Shots
31

== All-Star weekend ==
The 2016 AIHL All-Star Weekend was held at the Penrith Ice Palace on 11 and 12 June 2016. The format of the weekend remained unchanged from 2015 with a skills competition on 11 June and an all-stars game on 12 June. Sydney Bears' Michael Schlamp was announced as captain of one of the two teams for the second year in a row. Matt Armstrong of the Melbourne Ice was announced as the second team's captain, replacing Brian Bales from 2015. APA Group re-signed as sponsor of the weekend after sponsoring the 2015 inaugural event. Fox Sports also broadcast a 90-minute special from the weekend.

The Skills competition saw CBR Brave players take out three of the seven events, while both the Melbourne Mustangs and Sydney Bears picked up two each. On 12 June Team Schlamp defeated Team Armstrong 10–9 at the Penrith Ice Palace to win the 2016 All-Star Game. Michael Dorr of the Perth Thunder was named the most valuable player of the match and the best forward. The Sydney Bears' Ryan Annesley and Anthony Kimlin were named best defenceman and best goaltender respectively, and the Perth Thunder's Rob Haselhurst was named the best Australian player.

=== Skills competition ===
- Fastest Skater: Patrick O’Kane (Melbourne Mustangs)
- Breakaway Challenge: Geordie Wudrick (CBR Brave)
- Shooting Accuracy: Stephen Blunden (CBR Brave)
- Stickhandling: Casey Kubara (CBR Brave)
- Hardest Shot: James Isaacs (Melbourne Mustangs)
- Elimination Shootout: Brian Funes (Sydney Bears)
- Goaltender Race: Anthony Kimlin (Sydney Bears)

=== All-star game ===
| 12 June 2016; 15:00 | Team Schlamp | 10–9 (3–1, 2–4, 5–4) | Team Armstrong | Penrith Ice Palace |

Game reference
| 0 min | Penalties | 4 min |
| 39 | Shots | 34 |
