= 2017 AIHL season =

- League: Australian Ice Hockey League
- Sport: Ice hockey
- Duration: 22 April 2017 – 27 August 2017

Regular season
- H Newman Reid Trophy: Melbourne Ice (3rd title)
- Season MVP: Cameron Critchlow (Adrenaline)
- Top scorer: Benjamin Breault (58 points) (Thunder)

Goodall Cup
- Champions: Melbourne Ice
- Runners-up: CBR Brave
- Finals MVP: Sebastian Ottosson (Ice)

AIHL seasons
- 2016 2018

The 2017 AIHL season was the 18th season of the Australian Ice Hockey League (AIHL). It ran from 22 April 2017 until 27 August 2017, with the Goodall Cup finals following on 2 and 3 September. The Melbourne Ice won both the H Newman Reid Trophy for finishing first in the regular season, and the Goodall Cup after defeating the CBR Brave in the final.

== Teams ==
In 2017 the AIHL had 8 teams competing in the league.

2017 AIHL teams
Team	City	Arena	Head Coach	Captain
Adelaide Adrenaline	(South Australia) Adelaide	IceArenA	(Finland) Sami Mantere	(Australia) David Huxley
CBR Brave	(Australian Capital Territory) Canberra	Phillip Ice Skating Centre	(Australia) Robert Starke	(Australia) Mark Rummukainen
Melbourne Ice	(Victoria (state)) Melbourne	O'Brien Group Arena	(Sweden) Charles Franzén	(Australia) Lliam Webster
Melbourne Mustangs	(Victoria (state)) Melbourne	O'Brien Group Arena	(Australia) Michael Flaherty	(Australia) Michael McMahon
Newcastle Northstars	(New South Wales) Newcastle	Hunter Ice Skating Stadium	(Australia) Andrew Petrie	(Australia) Robert Malloy
Perth Thunder	(Western Australia) Perth	Perth Ice Arena	(Australia) Dave Ruck	(Australia) Jamie Woodman
Sydney Bears	(New South Wales) Sydney	Macquarie Ice Rink	(Australia) Ron Kuprowsky	(Australia) Michael Schlamp
Sydney Ice Dogs	(New South Wales) Sydney	Macquarie Ice Rink	(Australia) Christopher Blagg	(Australia) Scott Stephenson

== League business ==
In December 2016 the Adelaide Adrenaline revealed their new logo designs. The new primary logo features two peaks in the shape of the letter "A". The club also introduced a secondary logo featuring a piping shrike. In January 2017 the Melbourne Mustangs announced that the James Hotel would be their naming rights sponsor for the 2017 season, replacing MOAT: Mental Health Services which had held it since 2014. The James Hotel will also continue as the clubs pre- and post-game and function venue. The Mustangs also added Quest Docklands as a major sponsor in May. On 17 January 2017 the league announced that the Sydney Bears and Sydney Ice Dogs would relocate to the Macquarie Ice Rink. The Bears move from the Penrith Ice Palace where they have played since 2015 and the Ice Dogs move from the Liverpool Catholic Club Ice Rink. In March 2017 the Ice Dogs revealed their new jersey designs which saw the club remove their logo in favour of the words "ICE DOGS" written out diagonally across the front. In addition to the changes from the Adrenaline and Ice Dogs the CBR Brave, Melbourne Ice, Melbourne Mustangs, Newcastle Northstars and Sydney Bears also released new jersey designs. In March and April the Perth Thunder signed Richard's Tyrepower, MacTrack, MyLeadPod and Bendigo Bank as new sponsors for the 2017 season. The Thunder also announced that CD Dodd had increased their level of sponsorship for 2017, becoming the clubs naming rights sponsor. In April the Brave announced that the Tuggeranong Hyperdome had signed on as a major sponsor and Anytime Fitness had increased their sponsorship to be a major sponsor of the club. The following month the Brave announced that ONTHEGO had signed on as their official apparel partner. In April 2017 Newcastle changed their name from the Newcastle North Stars to the Newcastle Northstars. The re-brand was done to align the club with the New South Wales registered club, the Newcastle Northstars Ice Hockey Club. At the end of April the Adrenaline announced that radio station 1079 Life had signed on as their official media partner with the deal including at least one game being live broadcast and regular interviews. Also at the end of April both the Bears and Ice Dogs announced their official venue sponsors. The Bears signed The Ranch Hotel as their home venue sponsor while the Ice Dogs signed with T.G.I. Friday's Macquarie Centre restaurant. In May the Ice Dogs announced that they would be radio streaming the remainder of their home games via Mixlr. Also in May the Ice Dogs released a new logo as part of their 15th anniversary celebrations. The new logo featured a redesigned bulldog holding a broken ice hockey stick. In June the Brave signed The Woden Tradies & Quality Hotel as their official post-game venue for the remainder of the season. In June the Melbourne Ice announced that 'Life. Be in It' had signed on as their naming rights sponsor and Kidney Health Australia as their charity partner and volunteer sponsor. In August the Ice Dogs announced the signing of Crankt Protein as a new sponsor for the club.

=== Exhibition games ===
In February 2015 the Melbourne Ice and Melbourne Mustangs announced that they would host the New Zealand men's national ice hockey team in a four-game exhibition series at the O'Brien Group Arena, competing in two games each. The series was held as part of a warm up for New Zealand ahead of the 2017 IIHF Ice Hockey World Championship Division II Group B tournament. The Mustangs won both of their games 5–4 with the first being won in a shootout. The Ice defeated New Zealand 3–1 in the first game, however lost their second 0–9. The 2017 edition of the Wilson Cup was not held due to a high workload in relation to the move of the Bears to the Macquarie Ice Rink. It is the first time since 2013 that the tournament has not been held. The Wilson Cup was later re-purposed to be awarded to the winner of the regular season series between the Bears and Ice Dogs. The Bears retained the Cup after the series was tied both on wins and goal difference. On 13 April the Melbourne Ice and Melbourne Mustangs competed in an exhibition match at the O'Brien Group Arena with the Ice winning 8–1. On 15 April the Adelaide Adrenaline held an exhibition match against an Ice Hockey South Australia All Star team as part of the Hockey Day in Adelaide event at the Adelaide Ice Arena. The Adrenaline won the match 9–1. On 22 June the Melbourne Ice and Melbourne Mustangs joined the Ice Hockey Classic series for an exhibition game at the O'Brien Group Arena. The Ice joined Team Canada and the Mustangs joined Team USA for the 4 on 4 match. Team USA and the Mustangs defeated Team Canada and the Ice 8–5. On 22 July the Perth Thunder played an exhibition game at Cockburn Ice Arena against a team of Western Australian All-Stars to help raise funds for junior ice hockey. The Thunder won the match 9–1. On 7 September 2017 the Mustangs held their players v sponsors match at the O'Brien Group Arena with the game finishing in an eight all draw.

=== Personnel changes ===
In October 2016 it was announced that the Adelaide Adrenaline had signed Sami Mantere to the position of head coach, replacing interim head coach Eric Lien who had been in the role since June. The following month Perth Thunder head coach Dave Kenway stepped down from his position due to family and work commitments. Following his resignation Kenway took on the role of Director of Hockey at the club. Kenway was replaced in the position of head coach by former player Dave Ruck. In January 2017 the CBR Brave announced the signing of former Northstars' player Rob Starke as head coach. Starke comes into the position which was left empty after the departure of Josh Unice in August 2016. In March 2017 it was announced that the Ice Dogs had signed former Australian national team player Christopher Blagg to the position of head coach. The signing follows the resignation of Vladimir Rubes along with his assistant Christopher Sekura who both stepped down due to family commitments. The club also announced the signing of Christopher Foster and Andrew Waite as assistant coaches.

=== Player transfers ===
==== Interclub transfers ====
Nat	Player	Previous team	New team	Ref
(Australia)	Zachary Boyle	CBR Brave	Adelaide Adrenaline	
(Australia)	Billy Cliff	Sydney Bears	Sydney Ice Dogs	
(Australia)	Wehebe Darge	Adelaide Adrenaline	CBR Brave	
(Australia)	Dayne Davis	Newcastle Northstars	Melbourne Ice	
(Australia)	Darcy Flanagan	Melbourne Mustangs	Melbourne Ice	
(Australia)	Mitchell Humphries*	Melbourne Ice	Melbourne Mustangs	
(Australia)	Bayley Kubara	Sydney Ice Dogs	CBR Brave	
(Australia)	Nicholas Novysedlak	Melbourne Ice	Melbourne Mustangs	
(Australia)	Charlie Smart	Sydney Ice Dogs	Newcastle Northstars	

* Mid-season transfer.

==== Retirements ====
Nat	Player	Team	New role	Ref
(Australia)	Ryan Johnson	CBR Brave	–	

==== New signings ====
Nat	Player	Previous team	New team	Ref
(Canada)	Casey Babineau	University of Prince Edward Island	Adelaide Adrenaline	
(Sweden)	Kristoffer Backman	Vimmerby HC	Melbourne Ice	
(Australia)	Brian Bales	No team	CBR Brave	
(Australia)	Corey Banks	No team	CBR Brave	
(United States)	Matt Beattie	Étoile Noire de Strasbourg	Melbourne Mustangs	
(Australia)	Alan Becken	Blueline Bombers	Sydney Bears	
(Australia)	Nathaniel Benson	No team	Adelaide Adrenaline	
(Australia)	Gavin Birchler	Melbourne Glaciers	Melbourne Mustangs	
(Australia)	Robert Bird	No team	Perth Thunder	
(Australia)	Slavomir Boris	No team	Sydney Bears	
(Australia)	Michael Breedveld	Melbourne Sharks	Melbourne Ice	
(United States)	Jackson Brewer	Roanoke Rail Yard Dawgs	Sydney Bears	
(Australia)	Tyrone Bronte	Meijer AAA Hockey 18U	Melbourne Ice	
(Australia)	Jérémy Brown	Windsor Wild	Melbourne Ice	
(Australia)	Jeremy Brücker	EHC Seewen II	Sydney Bears	
(Canada)	Matt Buskas	No team	CBR Brave	
(Australia)	Andrew Chen	Adelaide Blackhawks	Adelaide Adrenaline	
(Canada)	Scott Corbett	No team	Melbourne Ice	
(Australia)	Ethan Cornford	New Tecumseth Civics	Melbourne Ice	
(Australia)	Kale Costa	HC Slovan Usti nad Labem U16	Sydney Ice Dogs	
(Australia)	Robert Covino	No team	Sydney Bears	
(Canada)	Cameron Critchlow	University of New Brunswick	Adelaide Adrenaline	
(Sweden)	Niklas Dahlberg	Tranås AIF	Melbourne Ice	
(Canada)	Peter Di Salvo	Mississippi RiverKings	Perth Thunder	
(Australia)	Kevin Dow	No team	Melbourne Ice	
(Australia)	Nickolas Eckhardt	No team	CBR Brave	
(Australia)	Glen Forbes White	Adelaide Generals	Adelaide Adrenaline	
(Australia)	Ben Gebert	Adelaide Falcons	Adelaide Adrenaline	
(Sweden)	Viktor Gibbs Sjödin	No team	Melbourne Ice	
(United States)	Joe Harcharik	Fayetteville FireAntz	Newcastle Northstars	
(Australia)	Justin Harrison	No team	Sydney Bears	
(Australia)	Damian Holland	Melbourne Blackhawks	Melbourne Mustangs	
(Canada)	Dominic Jalbert	Pionniers De Chamonix-Morzine	CBR Brave	
(Australia)	Michael James	No team	Melbourne Ice	
(Canada)	Stephen Johnston	No team	Sydney Ice Dogs	
(Australia)	Zane Jones	Innisfail Eagles	Newcastle Northstars	
(Australia)	James Keane	Adelaide Tigers	Adelaide Adrenaline	
(Australia)	Rhett Kelly	Reach Rebels	Sydney Ice Dogs	
(Canada)	Kale Kerbashian	Wheeling Nailers	Newcastle Northstars	
(Canada)	Damien Ketlo	University of Lethbridge	Sydney Ice Dogs	
(Finland)	Anton Kokkonen	TuKV	Melbourne Mustangs	
(Czech Republic)	Ales Kratoska	HC Tábor	Adelaide Adrenaline	
(United States)	James Kruger	Roanoke Rail Yard Dawgs	Melbourne Mustangs	
(Australia)	Toby Kubara	No team	CBR Brave	
(Australia)	Simon Kudla	No team	Perth Thunder	
(Canada)	Steven Kuhn	Bisons de Neuilly-sur-Marne	Newcastle Northstars	
(Canada)	Maxime Langelier-Parent	No team	Melbourne Mustangs	
(Australia)	Paul Lazzarotto	No team	Melbourne Mustangs	
(Finland)	Sami Mantere	Adelaide Red Wings	Adelaide Adrenaline	
(Canada)	Matt Marantz	University of Western Ontario	Newcastle Northstars	
(Australia)	James Marino	Sydney Wolf Pack	Sydney Ice Dogs	
(Australia)	Jaymie McDonnell	Northern Vikings	Perth Thunder	
(Australia)	Shannon McGregor	No team	Sydney Ice Dogs	
(Canada)	Morgan McNeill	Bouctouche JCs	Adelaide Adrenaline	
(Australia)	Chris McPhail	No team	CBR Brave	
(Australia)	Thomas Moncrieff	No team	Sydney Bears	
(Canada)	Matt Murphy	Royal Military College of Canada	Adelaide Adrenaline	
(Canada)	Tyler Noseworthy	Danbury Titans	Sydney Bears	
(Sweden)	Sebastian Ottosson	Tranås AIF	Melbourne Ice	
(Canada)	Christian Ouellet	Jonquière Marquis	Perth Thunder	
(Canada)	Félix-Antoine Poulin	Dundee Stars	Newcastle Northstars	
(Canada)	Rory Rawlyk	Atlanta Gladiators	Sydney Ice Dogs	
(Canada)	Nick Rivait	Fayetteville FireAntz	Sydney Bears	
(Australia)	Troy Robertson	Melbourne Braves	Melbourne Mustangs	
(Australia)	Vladimir Rubes	No team	Sydney Bears	
(Australia)	Jake Ruck	Aldergrove Kodiaks	Perth Thunder	
(Australia)	Tim Rye	Newcastle North Stars ECSL	Sydney Bears	
(Australia)	Hayden Sheard	Newcastle North Stars ECSL	Newcastle Northstars	
(Australia)	Lachlan Shumak	Vancouver Rangers	Sydney Ice Dogs	
(Australia)	Dale Tilsted	Penrith Raptors	Sydney Ice Dogs	
(Australia)	Shaun Tobin	Northern Samurai	Perth Thunder	
(Australia)	David Upton	No team	Sydney Ice Dogs	
(Australia)	Cameron Walsh	No team	Perth Thunder	
(Australia)	Alexander Wardlaw	Ontario Hockey Academy Mdgt AA	Sydney Bears	
(Australia)	Levon Wilson	Northern Vikings	Perth Thunder	
(Australia)	Seb Woodlands	Adelaide Falcons	Adelaide Adrenaline	

==== Players lost ====
Nat	Player	Previous team	New team	Ref
(Australia)	Steven Adams	Sydney Bears	Botany Swarm	
(Australia)	Spencer Austin	Sydney Bears	Penrith Raptors	
(Australia)	Brentin Azzopardi	Sydney Ice Dogs	Blueline Bombers	
(Australia)	Phil Bakatsoulas	Melbourne Mustangs	No team	
(United States)	T.J. Battani	Adelaide Adrenaline	No team	
(Canada)	Art Bidlevskii	CBR Brave	No team	
(Switzerland)	Nicola Brandi	CBR Brave	SC Rapperswil-Jona Lakers	
(Australia)	Russel Brewer	Adelaide Adrenaline	No team	
(Australia)	Dylan Burgess	Sydney Bears	No team	
(Australia)	Harrison Byers	CBR Brave	No team	
(Australia)	Scott Clemie	Sydney Ice Dogs	No team	
(Australia)	Timothy Cox	CBR Brave	No team	
(Australia)	Zane Cunliffe	Perth Thunder	No team	
(United States)	Troy Davenport	Melbourne Ice	Tulsa Oilers	
(United States)	Michael Dorr	Perth Thunder	Selber Wölfe	
(Australia)	Andrew Erzen	Melbourne Ice	No team	
(Australia)	Ted Fabijan	Adelaide Adrenaline	Adelaide Generals	
(Australia)	Kayne Fedor	Adelaide Adrenaline	Euless Junior Stars	
(Canada)	Zack Firlotte	Adelaide Adrenaline	Restigouche Nord Vikings	
(Australia)	Matthew Gilpin	CBR Brave	No team	
(Canada)	Brandon Greenside	Newcastle Northstars	Peoria Rivermen	
(Canada)	Mathieu Guertin	CBR Brave	Trois-Rivières Blizzard	
(Australia)	Sean Hamilton	Perth Thunder	No team	
(Australia)	Joshua Harding	Adelaide Adrenaline	No team	
(Hungary)	Dávid Harmati	Sydney Ice Dogs	No team	
(United States)	Josh Harris	Newcastle Northstars	Peoria Rivermen	
(New Zealand)	Dale Harrop	Perth Thunder	No team	
(Canada)	Thomas Heemskerk	Perth Thunder	No team	
(Australia)	Alex Henderson	Sydney Bears	Blueline Bombers	
(United States)	Mark Higgins	Melbourne Mustangs	No team	
(United Kingdom)	Jamie Holland	Adelaide Adrenaline	Adelaide Tigers	
(Australia)	Sam Hodic	Melbourne Ice	No team	
(Canada)	Geoff Irwin	Sydney Bears	No team	
(Canada)	James Isaacs	Melbourne Mustangs	Fife Flyers	
(Australia)	Harrison Jaunozols	Melbourne Ice	Melbourne Blackhawks	
(United States)	Nic Kawasaki	Sydney Bears	No team	
(Australia)	Adam Kimbley	Sydney Ice Dogs	No team	
(Australia)	Joshua Kleipas	Sydney Ice Dogs	Sydney Sting	
(Denmark)	Lasse Lassen	Melbourne Ice	Herning Blue Fox	
(Canada)	Éric Louis-Seize	Melbourne Mustangs	No team	
(Australia)	Lukas Manco	Sydney Ice Dogs	No team	
(Australia)	David Mahood	Perth Thunder	No team	
(Australia)	Michael McDowell	Melbourne Mustangs	No team	
(United States)	Connor McLaughlin	Newcastle Northstars	University of Alberta-Augustana	
(Australia)	Ian Merwin	Sydney Bears	No team	
(Australia)	Charlie Moore	Melbourne Mustangs	No team	
(Australia)	Luke Moore	CBR Brave	No team	
(Australia)	Anthony Nottle	Perth Thunder	No team	
(Canada)	Gabriel O'Connor	Adelaide Adrenaline	Drakkars de Caen	
(Australia)	Sam O'Neill-Hodges	Adelaide Adrenaline	No team	
(Australia)	Cian O'Reilly	Sydney Ice Dogs	No team	
(Australia)	Brendan Oakes	Melbourne Ice	No team	
(Australia)	Dion Palmer	Adelaide Adrenaline	No team	
(Italy)	Nicola Pau	Adelaide Adrenaline	No team	
(Canada)	Neal Prokop	CBR Brave	No team	
(Australia)	Harley Quinton-Jones	Newcastle Northstars	Newcastle North Stars ECSL	
(New Zealand)	Ryan Ruddle	Melbourne Mustangs	No team	
(New Zealand)	Remy Sandoy	Sydney Ice Dogs	No team	
(Slovenia)	David Sefic	Melbourne Mustangs	HK Beograd	
(Australia)	Chris Slauenwhite	Melbourne Mustangs	No team	
(Australia)	Cam Smith	Sydney Bears	No team	
(Australia)	Cameron Smith	Sydney Ice Dogs	Seguin Huskies	
(Czech Republic)	Petr Stepanek	Sydney Ice Dogs	Peterborough Phantoms	
(Australia)	Alec Stephenson	Sydney Ice Dogs	No team	
(Australia)	Thomas Steven	Melbourne Mustangs	Bellingham Blazers	
(Australia)	Greg Sturrock	Melbourne Ice	No team	
(United Kingdom)	Paul Swindlehurst	Sydney Ice Dogs	Manchester Storm	
(Canada)	Scott Swiston	Newcastle Northstars	University of Alberta-Augustana	
(Australia)	Beau Taylor	Newcastle Northstars	University of Alberta-Augustana	
(Australia)	Lee Turner	Sydney Bears	Penrith Raptors	
(Australia)	Daniel Wilkinson	Perth Thunder	HC Giants Akatemia	
(Canada)	Brandon Wong	Newcastle Northstars	EV Regensburg	
(Japan)	Chris Yule	Melbourne Ice	No team	
(Australia)	Andrey Zolotarev	Adelaide Adrenaline	No team	
(Australia)	Luke Zvonicek	Sydney Bears	Blueline Bombers	

== Regular season ==
The regular season began on 22 April 2017 and ran through to 27 August 2017 before the top four teams advanced to compete in the Goodall Cup playoff series. On 7 May the game between the Melbourne Ice and Sydney Bears had to be cancelled after the first period due to a fire in the Macquarie Ice Rink's speaker system. It was later rescheduled to 16 July at the Macquarie Ice Rink. Due to the 2017 Ice Hockey Classic which was held on 17 June in Sydney and 24 June in Melbourne the league made two changes to the June fixture. The match between the Sydney Ice Dogs and Newcastle North Stars was moved from 17 to 16 June. The other match moved was between the Melbourne Ice and Melbourne Mustangs which was changed from 24 to 25 June.

=== Themed games ===
The 10 June game between the CBR Brave and Adelaide Adrenaline served as the third annual beyondblue Cup, setup held to raise awareness for the charity. The Brave won the Cup for the third year in a row, defeating the Adrenaline 8–3.

The 1 July match between the Melbourne Ice and Sydney Bears served as the fourth annual Canada Day Classic. The Ice won the match 6–4, claiming the title for the first time. The 2017 Matt Clark Shield match was also held on 1 July and was contested between the Sydney Ice Dogs and Perth Thunder. The Ice Dogs won the match 5–3 to claim their second Matt Clark Shield having defeated the Adrenaline last year.

The 8 July match between the Perth Thunder and CBR Brave served the Thunder's charity match. The match, known as "Pink on the Rink", was held as a fundraiser for the McGrath Foundation and saw the Thunder wearing an all-pinked jersey.

Round 13, which ran on 22 and 23 July, was the league's Pride Round. The round was held to raise awareness for the LGBTIQ community, and saw the Mustangs wear a pride themed rainbow jersey.

On 30 July the Melbourne Ice held a Swedish themed day. As part of the day the club wore a blue-and-gold-coloured variant of their jersey in the match against the Sydney Ice Dogs.

During Round 15, which ran on 4 and 5 August, the Adelaide Adrenaline held a heritage round. The round saw the Adrenaline wearing an Adelaide Avalanche themed jersey in their two games against the Perth Thunder.

=== By month ===
==== April ====
Date	Time	Away	Score	Home	Location	Attendance	Recap
22 April	16:30	Newcastle Northstars	3–4	Adelaide Adrenaline	Adelaide Ice Arena		
22 April	17:00	CBR Brave	4–2	Melbourne Mustangs	O'Brien Group Arena		
22 April	17:00	Sydney Ice Dogs	1–0	Sydney Bears	Macquarie Ice Rink		
23 April	16:00	CBR Brave	4 – 3 (SO)	Melbourne Mustangs	O'Brien Group Arena		
23 April	16:30	Newcastle Northstars	2–3	Perth Thunder	Perth Ice Arena		
29 April	17:00	Adelaide Adrenaline	2–5	Melbourne Ice	O'Brien Group Arena		
29 April	17:00	Perth Thunder	4–1	Sydney Ice Dogs	Macquarie Ice Rink		
29 April	17:00	Sydney Bears	2–5	Newcastle Northstars	Hunter Ice Skating Stadium		
30 April	16:00	Adelaide Adrenaline	5–8	Melbourne Ice	O'Brien Group Arena		
30 April	17:00	Perth Thunder	1 – 2 (SO)	Sydney Bears	Macquarie Ice Rink		
30 April	17:00	CBR Brave	5 – 4 (SO)	Newcastle Northstars	Hunter Ice Skating Stadium		

==== May ====
Date	Time	Away	Score	Home	Location	Attendance	Recap
6 May	16:30	Sydney Ice Dogs	4–2	Adelaide Adrenaline	Adelaide Ice Arena		
6 May	17:00	Melbourne Ice	4 – 3 (SO)	Newcastle Northstars	Hunter Ice Skating Stadium		
6 May	17:00	CBR Brave	1–3	Sydney Bears	Macquarie Ice Rink		
7 May	16:30	Sydney Ice Dogs	2–5	Adelaide Adrenaline	Adelaide Ice Arena		
7 May	17:00	Newcastle Northstars	6 – 5 (SO)	CBR Brave	Phillip Ice Skating Centre		
13 May	16:30	Sydney Bears	5 – 4 (SO)	Perth Thunder	Perth Ice Arena		
13 May	17:00	Melbourne Ice	2–1	Melbourne Mustangs	O'Brien Group Arena		
13 May	17:00	Adelaide Adrenaline	1–5	Sydney Ice Dogs	Macquarie Ice Rink		
13 May	17:30	Newcastle Northstars	3–4	CBR Brave	Phillip Ice Skating Centre		
14 May	16:00	Adelaide Adrenaline	5–9	Melbourne Mustangs	O'Brien Group Arena		
14 May	16:30	Sydney Bears	2 – 3 (SO)	Perth Thunder	Perth Ice Arena		
14 May	17:00	Newcastle Northstars	4–3	Sydney Ice Dogs	Macquarie Ice Rink		
20 May	17:00	Melbourne Mustangs	0–9	Melbourne Ice	O'Brien Group Arena		
20 May	17:00	Perth Thunder	4–1	Newcastle Northstars	Hunter Ice Skating Stadium		
20 May	17:00	Adelaide Adrenaline	3 – 2 (SO)	Sydney Bears	Macquarie Ice Rink		
21 May	16:00	Adelaide Adrenaline	7–3	Melbourne Mustangs	O'Brien Group Arena		
21 May	17:00	Perth Thunder	4–8	Sydney Bears	Macquarie Ice Rink		
21 May	17:00	Sydney Ice Dogs	4–2	Newcastle Northstars	Hunter Ice Skating Stadium		
27 May	16:30	Newcastle Northstars	3 – 2 (SO)	Adelaide Adrenaline	Adelaide Ice Arena		
27 May	17:00	Sydney Bears	6–7	Melbourne Mustangs	O'Brien Group Arena		
27 May	17:00	CBR Brave	4–1	Sydney Ice Dogs	Macquarie Ice Rink		
28 May	16:00	Sydney Bears	5 – 6 (SO)	Melbourne Mustangs	O'Brien Group Arena		
28 May	16:30	Newcastle Northstars	1–5	Perth Thunder	Perth Ice Arena		
28 May	17:00	Sydney Ice Dogs	2–4	CBR Brave	Phillip Ice Skating Centre		

==== June ====
Date	Time	Away	Score	Home	Location	Attendance	Recap
10 June	16:30	Melbourne Ice	5–1	Perth Thunder	Perth Ice Arena		
10 June	17:00	Melbourne Mustangs	3–6	Newcastle Northstars	Hunter Ice Skating Stadium		
10 June	17:00	Sydney Bears	0–3	Sydney Ice Dogs	Macquarie Ice Rink		
10 June	17:30	Adelaide Adrenaline	3–8	CBR Brave	Phillip Ice Skating Centre		
11 June	16:30	Melbourne Ice	3 – 2 (SO)	Perth Thunder	Perth Ice Arena		
11 June	17:00	Adelaide Adrenaline	8–5	CBR Brave	Phillip Ice Skating Centre		
11 June	17:00	Melbourne Mustangs	6–4	Sydney Bears	Macquarie Ice Rink		
16 June	20:15	Newcastle Northstars	2–7	Sydney Ice Dogs	Macquarie Ice Rink		
17 June	16:30	Melbourne Mustangs	5–1	Adelaide Adrenaline	Adelaide Ice Arena		
17 June	17:00	Perth Thunder	3–6	Melbourne Ice	O'Brien Group Arena		
17 June	17:30	Sydney Bears	3–13	CBR Brave	Phillip Ice Skating Centre		
18 June	16:00	Perth Thunder	5–3	Melbourne Ice	O'Brien Group Arena		
18 June	16:30	Melbourne Mustangs	5–2	Adelaide Adrenaline	Adelaide Ice Arena		
18 June	17:00	Newcastle Northstars	4–8	Sydney Bears	Macquarie Ice Rink		
24 June	16:30	Sydney Ice Dogs	1–2	Perth Thunder	Perth Ice Arena		
24 June	17:00	Adelaide Adrenaline	4 – 5 (SO)	Newcastle Northstars	Hunter Ice Skating Stadium		
24 June	17:30	Sydney Bears	1–7	CBR Brave	Phillip Ice Skating Centre		
25 June	16:00	Melbourne Ice	6–2	Melbourne Mustangs	O'Brien Group Arena		
25 June	16:30	Sydney Ice Dogs	0–2	Perth Thunder	Perth Ice Arena		
25 June	17:00	Adelaide Adrenaline	4–5	Sydney Bears	Macquarie Ice Rink		

==== July ====
Date	Time	Away	Score	Home	Location	Attendance	Recap
1 July	17:00	Sydney Bears	4–6	Melbourne Ice	O'Brien Group Arena		
1 July	17:00	Perth Thunder	3–5	Sydney Ice Dogs	Macquarie Ice Rink		
1 July	17:30	Melbourne Mustangs	5–3	CBR Brave	Phillip Ice Skating Centre		
2 July	16:00	Sydney Bears	5–6	Melbourne Ice	O'Brien Group Arena		
2 July	17:00	Melbourne Mustangs	5 – 6 (SO)	CBR Brave	Phillip Ice Skating Centre		
2 July	17:00	Perth Thunder	5 – 4 (SO)	Newcastle Northstars	Hunter Ice Skating Stadium		
8 July	16:30	CBR Brave	2–4	Perth Thunder	Perth Ice Arena		
8 July	16:30	Melbourne Ice	6–3	Adelaide Adrenaline	Adelaide Ice Arena		
8 July	17:00	Sydney Ice Dogs	3–5	Melbourne Mustangs	O'Brien Group Arena		
8 July	17:00	Newcastle Northstars	5–3	Sydney Bears	Macquarie Ice Rink		
9 July	16:00	Sydney Ice Dogs	5–1	Melbourne Mustangs	O'Brien Group Arena		
9 July	16:30	Melbourne Ice	2–0	Adelaide Adrenaline	Adelaide Ice Arena		
9 July	16:30	CBR Brave	0–5	Perth Thunder	Perth Ice Arena		
13 July	17:00	Melbourne Mustangs	3 – 2 (SO)	Melbourne Ice	O'Brien Group Arena		
15 July	17:00	Adelaide Adrenaline	4–7	Newcastle Northstars	Hunter Ice Skating Stadium		
15 July	17:00	Sydney Ice Dogs	2–4	Sydney Bears	Macquarie Ice Rink		
15 July	17:30	Perth Thunder	3–2	CBR Brave	Phillip Ice Skating Centre		
16 July	14:30	Melbourne Ice	2–1	Sydney Bears	Macquarie Ice Rink		
16 July	17:00	Perth Thunder	3–1	CBR Brave	Phillip Ice Skating Centre		
16 July	17:00	Adelaide Adrenaline	2–0	Sydney Ice Dogs	Macquarie Ice Rink		
22 July	16:30	CBR Brave	10–5	Adelaide Adrenaline	Adelaide Ice Arena		
22 July	17:00	Newcastle Northstars	3–6	Melbourne Mustangs	O'Brien Group Arena		
22 July	17:00	Melbourne Ice	4–3	Sydney Bears	Macquarie Ice Rink		
23 July	16:00	Newcastle Northstars	4–1	Melbourne Mustangs	O'Brien Group Arena		
23 July	16:30	CBR Brave	4–1	Adelaide Adrenaline	Adelaide Ice Arena		
23 July	17:00	Melbourne Ice	3–4	Sydney Ice Dogs	Macquarie Ice Rink		
29 July	16:30	Melbourne Mustangs	2 – 3 (SO)	Perth Thunder	Perth Ice Arena		
29 July	17:00	Sydney Ice Dogs	1–4	Melbourne Ice	O'Brien Group Arena		
29 July	17:00	CBR Brave	7–4	Sydney Bears	Macquarie Ice Rink		
30 July	16:00	Sydney Ice Dogs	2–4	Melbourne Ice	O'Brien Group Arena		
30 July	16:30	Melbourne Mustangs	4–1	Perth Thunder	Perth Ice Arena		
30 July	17:00	Sydney Bears	4–7	Newcastle Northstars	Hunter Ice Skating Stadium		

==== August ====
Date	Time	Away	Score	Home	Location	Attendance	Recap
4 August	20:00	Sydney Bears	5–3	Sydney Ice Dogs	Macquarie Ice Rink		
5 August	16:30	Perth Thunder	3–4	Adelaide Adrenaline	Adelaide Ice Arena		
5 August	17:00	Newcastle Northstars	4–7	Melbourne Ice	O'Brien Group Arena		
5 August	17:30	Sydney Ice Dogs	4–2	CBR Brave	Phillip Ice Skating Centre		
6 August	16:00	Newcastle Northstars	1–4	Melbourne Ice	O'Brien Group Arena		
6 August	16:30	Perth Thunder	4–2	Adelaide Adrenaline	Adelaide Ice Arena		
12 August	17:00	Melbourne Mustangs	2–1	Sydney Ice Dogs	Macquarie Ice Rink		
12 August	17:00	Melbourne Ice	5–8	CBR Brave	Phillip Ice Skating Centre		
13 August	16:00	Melbourne Mustangs	6–1	Newcastle Northstars	Hunter Ice Skating Stadium		
13 August	17:00	Melbourne Ice	6–3	CBR Brave	Phillip Ice Skating Centre		
19 August	16:30	Sydney Bears	3 – 2 (SO)	Adelaide Adrenaline	Adelaide Ice Arena		
19 August	17:00	CBR Brave	8–1	Newcastle Northstars	Hunter Ice Skating Stadium		
19 August	17:00	Melbourne Ice	4–1	Sydney Ice Dogs	Macquarie Ice Rink		
19 August	17:00	Perth Thunder	5–4	Melbourne Mustangs	O'Brien Group Arena		
20 August	16:00	Perth Thunder	5–1	Melbourne Mustangs	O'Brien Group Arena		
20 August	16:00	Melbourne Ice	6–4	Newcastle Northstars	Hunter Ice Skating Stadium		
20 August	16:30	Sydney Bears	3–0	Adelaide Adrenaline	Adelaide Ice Arena		
20 August	17:00	CBR Brave	6–1	Sydney Ice Dogs	Macquarie Ice Rink		
26 August	16:30	Adelaide Adrenaline	3–11	Perth Thunder	Perth Ice Arena		
26 August	17:00	CBR Brave	2–5	Melbourne Ice	O'Brien Group Arena		
26 August	17:00	Sydney Ice Dogs	3–2	Newcastle Northstars	Hunter Ice Skating Stadium		
26 August	17:00	Melbourne Mustangs	5–6	Sydney Bears	Macquarie Ice Rink		
27 August	16:00	CBR Brave	2–5	Melbourne Ice	O'Brien Group Arena		
27 August	16:30	Adelaide Adrenaline	1–12	Perth Thunder	Perth Ice Arena		
27 August	17:00	Melbourne Mustangs	2–4	Sydney Ice Dogs	Macquarie Ice Rink		

=== Standings ===
Team	GP	W	SOW	SOL	L	GF	GA	GDF	PTS
Melbourne Ice	28	22	2	1	3	132	75	+57	71
Perth Thunder	28	16	3	3	6	110	75	+35	57
CBR Brave	28	13	3	1	11	130	101	+29	46
Melbourne Mustangs	28	11	2	3	12	104	113	−9	40
Sydney Ice Dogs	28	12	0	0	16	73	81	−8	36
Sydney Bears	28	8	3	3	14	101	121	−20	33
Newcastle Northstars	28	7	3	3	15	97	124	−27	30
Adelaide Adrenaline	28	6	1	3	18	85	142	−57	23

Qualified for the Goodall Cup playoffs	H Newman Reid Trophy winners

=== Statistics ===
==== Scoring leaders ====
List shows the ten top skaters sorted by points, then goals. Updated 27 August 2017.

Player	Team	GP	G	A	Pts	PIM	POS
Benjamin Breault	Perth Thunder	27	22	36	58	41	F
Geordie Wudrick	CBR Brave	25	20	34	54	28	F
Dominic Jalbert	CBR Brave	28	16	37	53	72	D
Christian Ouellet	Perth Thunder	23	14	34	48	14	F
Jamie Bourke	Melbourne Mustangs	28	24	23	47	40	F
Stephen Blunden	CBR Brave	16	24	22	46	16	F
Jackson Brewer	Sydney Bears	27	17	28	45	24	F
Joseph Harcharik	Newcastle Northstars	26	20	24	44	12	F
Steven Kuhn	Newcastle Northstars	26	13	31	44	6	F
Cameron Critchlow	Adelaide Adrenaline	26	22	21	43	18	F
Joseph Hughes	Melbourne Ice	25	18	25	43	69	F
Anton Kokkonen	Melbourne Mustangs	23	13	30	43	10	F

==== Leading goaltenders ====
Only the top five goaltenders, based on save percentage with a minimum 40% of the team's ice time. Updated 27 August 2017.

Player	Team	MIP	SOG	GA	GAA	SVS%	SO
Peter Di Salvo	Perth Thunder	1380	924	70	2.54	0.924	2
Damien Ketlo	Sydney Ice Dogs	1391	1001	77	2.77	0.923	2
Matt Murphy	Adelaide Adrenaline	746	630	56	3.75	0.911	1
Dayne Davis	Melbourne Ice	1073	537	50	2.33	0.907	2
James Kruger	Melbourne Mustangs	896	582	57	3.18	0.902	0

=== Season awards ===
The Melbourne Ice won the H. Newman Reid Trophy after finishing first in the regular season with 71 points. The Adelaide Adrenaline's Cameron Critchlow won the Most Valuable Player and Rob Haselhurst of the Perth Thunder was named Defenceman of the Year. The CBR Brave's Bayley Kubara was named Rookie of the Year, Damien Ketlo of the Sydney Ice Dogs won the Goaltender of the Year and the Melbourne Ice's Joey Hughes was named the Skaters Network Local Player of the Year. Perth Thunder's Dave Ruck was named Coach of the Year.

Below lists the 2017 AIHL regular season award winners.

Award	Name	Team
MVP	(Canada) Cameron Critchlow	Adelaide Adrenaline
Goaltender	(Canada) Damien Ketlo	Sydney Ice Dogs
Defenceman	(Australia) Rob Haselhurst	Perth Thunder
Rookie	(Australia) Bayley Kubara	CBR Brave
Local player	(Australia) Joey Hughes	Melbourne Ice
Coach	(Australia) Dave Ruck	Perth Thunder

== Goodall Cup playoffs ==
The 2017 playoffs started on 2 September with the Goodall Cup final held on 3 September. Following the end of the regular season the top four teams advanced to the playoff series. All three games were held at the O'Brien Group Arena in Docklands, Victoria, the home of the Melbourne Ice and Melbourne Mustangs. The series was a single game elimination with the two winning semi-finalists advancing to the Goodall Cup final. The finals were sponsored by Air Canada, the fifth year in a row. The Goodall Cup was won by the Melbourne Ice who defeated the CBR Brave 4–1. The Ice's Sebastian Ottosson was named the finals most valuable player.

Semi-finals
1	Melbourne Ice	4
4	Melbourne Mustangs	2
3	CBR Brave	6
2	Perth Thunder	2

Final
Melbourne Ice	4
CBR Brave	1

All times are UTC+10:00

=== Semi-finals ===
2 September 2017; 15:00	Melbourne Mustangs	2–4 (0–1, 0–1, 2–2)	Melbourne Ice	O'Brien Group Arena

Game reference

James Kruger
Goalies
Dayne Davis
Referees:
Glen Foll
Dave Gal
Linesmen:
Steve Setka
Fraser Ohlson

	0 – 1	12:32 – Baclig (Hughes)
	0 – 2	28:51 – Dahlberg (Armstrong, Gibbs Sjödin)
34:36 – Humphries (PP) (Kokkonen, Langelier-Parent)	1 – 2
	1 – 3	37:41 – Webster (Hughes)
44:16 – Kokkonen (PP) (McMahon, Humphries)	2 – 3
	2 – 4	49:45 – Ottosson (EN) (unassisted)

16 min
Penalties
4 min
29
Shots
38

2 September 2017; 18:00	CBR Brave	6–2 (0–0, 2–1, 4–1)	Perth Thunder	O'Brien Group Arena

Game reference

Aleksi Toivonen
Goalies
Peter Di Salvo
Referees:
Kent Unwin
Jeff Scott
Linesmen:
Casper Russelhuber
Stephen De Witt

15:55 – Blunden (Bales, Wudrick)	1 – 0
	1 – 1	16:50 – Ouellet (Bernard, Kudla)
21:20 – Bales (PP) (Wudrick, Darge)	2 – 1
	2 – 2	30:26 – Bernard (PP) (Breault, Göransson)
32:25 – Jalbert (Blunden, Darge)	3 – 2
33:51 – Safar (PP) (Darge, Jalbert)	4 – 2
41:55 – Blunden (PP) (Darge, Jalbert)	5 – 2
48:10 – Wudrick (EN) (Jalbert, Safar)	6 – 2

12 min
Penalties
30 min
34
Shots
22

=== Final ===
3 September 2017; 15:00	CBR Brave	1–4 (0–1, 1–1, 0–2)	Melbourne Ice	O'Brien Group Arena; Attendance: 1500

Game reference

Aleksi Toivonen
Goalies
Dayne Davis
Referees:
Jeff Scott
Kent Unwin
Linesmen:
Steve Setka
Casper Russelhuber

	0 – 1	6:49 – Wong (Baclig, Carpenter)
22:37 – Blunden (Jalbert)	1 – 1
	1 – 2	29:24 – Ottosson (Brown, Dahlberg)
	1 – 3	32:18 – Ottosson (Powell, Brown)
	1 – 4	41:00 – Armstrong (Gibbs Sjödin)

8 min
Penalties
8 min
21
Shots
28

== All-Star weekend ==
The 2017 AIHL All-Star Weekend was held at the O'Brien Group Arena, Melbourne on 3 and 4 June 2017. The format of the weekend remained unchanged from 2016 with a skills competition on 3 June and an all-stars game on 4 June. Melbourne Mustangs' Jamie Bourke and Lliam Webster of the Melbourne Ice were announced as the captains of the two teams replacing Michael Schlamp and Matt Armstrong from 2016. APA Group re-signed as sponsor of the weekend after sponsoring the previous two events. The weekend is also included on the Fox Sports broadcast schedule.

The Skills competition saw Melbourne Mustangs players take out three of the seven events, the Melbourne Ice took two, and the Adelaide Adrenaline and Sydney Ice Dogs both picked up one each. On 4 June Team Webster defeated Team Bourke 14–7 at the O'Brien Group Arena to win the 2017 All-Star Game. Dominic Jalbert of the CBR Brave was named the most valuable player of the match.

=== Skills competition ===
- Breakaway Challenge: Joseph Hughes (Melbourne Ice)
- Elimination Shootout: Josef Rezek (Adelaide Adrenaline)
- Fastest Skater: Patrick O’Kane (Melbourne Mustangs) – 11 seconds
- Goaltender Race: Damien Ketlo (Sydney Ice Dogs)
- Hardest Shot: Matt Beattie (Melbourne Mustangs) – 146 km/h
- Shooting Accuracy: Jamie Bourke (Melbourne Mustangs) – 9.3 seconds
- Stickhandling: Joseph Hughes (Melbourne Ice)

=== All-star game ===
4 June 2017; 14:00	Team Bourke	7–14	Team Webster	O'Brien Group Arena

Game reference
