= List of Melbourne Mustangs players =

The Melbourne Mustangs are an ice hockey team based in Melbourne, Victoria, Australia and are members of the Australian Ice Hockey League (AIHL). Founded in 2010, as the Mustangs Ice Hockey Club, the team joined the AIHL in 2011 and have made the Goodall Cup playoffs on two occasions, winning once in 2014. Since their inception, 79 players have played at least one regular season game for the Mustangs. The team's current captain is Michael McMahon who has held that position since the 2017 season, taking over from Patrick O'Kane. Australian Jamie Bourke leads the team in scoring with 231 points in 145 games.

== Legend ==
GP	Games played	W	Wins	L	Losses
Pos	Position	F	Forward	D	Defenceman
GK	Goaltender	G	Goals	A	Assists
Pts	Points	PIM	Penalties in minutes	Min	Minutes played
GAA	Goals against average	SO	Shutouts	SV%	Save percentage

Statistics complete as of the end of the 2017 AIHL season.

== Goaltenders ==
Name	Nationality	Seasons	GP	W	L	MIN	SO	GAA	SV%	GP	W	L	MIN	SO	GAA	SV%	Notes
Name	Nationality	Seasons	Regular season							Playoffs							Notes
Fraser Carson	Australia	2011–2017	85	43	34	3836	4	3.30	0.882	2	2	0	100	0	2.50	0.904	
Jack Hayes	Australia	2015–2017	9	3	1	306	0	3.76	0.850	—	—	—	—	—	—	—	
Damian Holland	Australia	2017	1	1	0	50	0	6.00	0.760	—	—	—	—	—	—	—	
Mark Howell	Australia	2011	6	2	4	181	0	5.80	0.724	—	—	—	—	—	—	—	
Michael James	Australia	2011–2015	41	9	27	1626	0	4.89	0.845	—	—	—	—	—	—	—	
James Kruger	United States	2017	18	10	8	896	0	3.18	0.902	1	0	1	49	0	3.06	0.919	
Nicholas Novysedlak	Australia	2017	4	1	3	172	0	6.10	0.821	—	—	—	—	—	—	—	
Jon Olthuis	Canada	2013	23	12	11	1150	0	3.65	0.898	—	—	—	—	—	—	—	
Chris Slauenwhite	Australia	2016	12	5	6	514	0	3.79	0.880	—	—	—	—	—	—	—	
Oliver Wren	Canada	2012	13	3	10	541	0	4.71	0.861	—	—	—	—	—	—	—	

== Skaters ==
Name	Nationality	Pos	Seasons	GP	G	A	Pts	PIM	GP	G	A	Pts	PIM	Notes
Name	Nationality	Pos	Seasons	Regular season					Playoffs					Notes
Drew Akins	United States	D	2015	9	3	12	15	4	—	—	—	—	—	
Travis Alabaster	Australia	D	2013	9	0	1	1	0	—	—	—	—	—	
Matthew Anderson	Australia	F	2011–2012, 2014	55	16	17	33	50	—	—	—	—	—	
Phillip Bakatsoulas	Australia	D	2016	4	0	1	1	0	—	—	—	—	—	
Corey Banfield	Canada	F	2015	18	11	25	36	10	—	—	—	—	—	
Matthew Beattie	United States	D	2017	27	7	16	23	14	1	0	0	0	0	
Andrew Belic	Australia	F	2011–2017	161	24	33	57	150	3	1	0	1	0	
Stephen Belic	Australia	D	2011–2017	106	1	8	9	51	2	0	0	0	0	
Ryan Bennett	Australia	D	2011–2012	40	0	5	5	154	—	—	—	—	—	
Enrico Bergamin	Australia	D	2011–2012	36	1	2	3	45	—	—	—	—	—	
Gavin Birchler	Australia	F	2017	1	0	0	0	0	—	—	—	—	—	
Jamie Bourke	Australia	F	2011, 2013–2017	142	112	111	223	596	3	3	5	8	14	
Damian Bright	Australia	D	2011–2017	115	1	17	18	111	3	0	0	0	0	
Jack Carpenter	Australia	D	2011–2012	28	0	2	2	10	—	—	—	—	—	
Scott Corbett	Canada	F	2011	26	21	22	43	46	—	—	—	—	—	
Ethan Cornford	Australia	F	2014–2015	14	1	2	3	10	—	—	—	—	—	
Todd Cutter	Australia	F	2013	6	2	0	2	2	—	—	—	—	—	
Dean Dunstan	Australia	F	2011–2012	30	10	12	22	22	—	—	—	—	—	
Jake Ebner	Canada	F	2012	19	10	7	17	12	—	—	—	—	—	
Luke Fisher	Australia	F	2016–2017	20	1	1	2	10	—	—	—	—	—	
Andrew Fitzgerald	Australia	F	2012–2015	52	6	7	13	49	—	—	—	—	—	
Darcy Flanagan	Australia	D	2016–2017	13	0	0	0	4	—	—	—	—	—	
Robin Forsythe	South Africa	F	2013	14	1	0	1	18	—	—	—	—	—	
David Foster	Australia	D	2016–2017	7	0	1	1	2	—	—	—	—	—	
Viktor Gibbs Sjödin	Sweden	F	2014–2015	47	24	45	69	105	2	5	3	8	0	
Kevin Glanzman	United States	D	2013	23	2	20	22	26	—	—	—	—	—	
Ben Grant	Australia	D	2011	8	0	1	1	8	—	—	—	—	—	
Jeff Grant	United States	D	2014–2015	47	9	46	55	34	2	1	1	2	0	
Alexander Hall	Australia	F	2013–2014	44	4	6	10	80	2	0	0	0	0	
Shane Hardy	Australia	F	2011–2012	44	13	14	27	210	—	—	—	—	—	Captain, 2011–2012
Mark Higgins	United States	D	2016	26	4	6	10	14	—	—	—	—	—	
Stuart Higgins	Australia	F	2013	2	0	1	1	6	—	—	—	—	—	
Joseph Hughes	Australia	F	2014–2015	45	39	31	70	135	2	1	2	3	0	
Vincent Hughes	Australia	D	2014–2015	46	1	12	13	140	2	0	1	1	4	
Mitchell Humphries	Australia	F	2017	14	4	11	15	12	1	1	1	2	0	
James Isaacs	Canada	D	2016	27	3	12	15	54	—	—	—	—	—	
Christopher James	Australia	F	2011–2012	31	1	9	10	26	—	—	—	—	—	
Sean Jones	Australia	F	2011–2017	136	37	52	89	137	3	0	1	1	2	Captain, 2013–2015
Brendan Knox	Australia	F	2011	4	0	0	0	0	—	—	—	—	—	
Anton Kokkonen	Finland	F	2017	23	13	30	43	10	1	1	1	2	0	
Martin Kutek	Czech	D	2014	4	2	0	2	31	—	—	—	—	—	
Maxime Langelier-Parent	Canada	F	2017	17	15	20	35	28	1	0	1	1	0	
Paul Lazzarotto	Australia	F	2017	14	1	2	3	2	—	—	—	—	—	
Scott Levitt	Canada	D	2011–2012	50	14	23	37	34	—	—	—	—	—	
Éric Louis-Seize	Canada	F	2016	27	8	19	27	42	—	—	—	—	—	
Jackson McCoy	Australia	F	2011–2013, 2015–2017	116	9	17	26	64	1	0	0	0	2	
Brendan McDowell	Australia	F	2012–2017	149	53	67	120	72	3	0	0	0	0	
Michael McDowell	Australia	D	2011, 2013–2016	93	0	10	10	49	2	0	0	0	0	
Michael McMahon	Australia	D	2016–2017	42	2	12	14	26	1	0	1	1	0	Captain, 2017
Charlie Moore	Australia	D	2016	4	0	1	1	0	—	—	—	—	—	
Dean Moore	United States	D	2012	14	2	4	6	20	—	—	—	—	—	
Alan Moss	Australia	D	2013–2015	39	1	6	7	16	2	0	0	0	2	
Adrian Nash	Australia	F	2011–2014	75	16	12	28	124	2	0	0	0	0	
Patrick O'Kane	United States	F	2013–2017	138	104	104	208	64	2	1	3	4	2	Captain, 2016
Brendan Oakes	Australia	D	2011–2014	38	0	1	1	2	—	—	—	—	—	
Troy Robertson	Australia	F	2011–2012, 2014, 2017	71	5	18	23	123	3	0	0	0	4	
Ryan Ruddle	New Zealand	F	2016	23	2	2	4	76	—	—	—	—	—	
James Sanford	Canada	D	2012	5	2	2	4	22	—	—	—	—	—	
David Sefic	Slovenia	F	2016	3	0	1	1	0	—	—	—	—	—	
Thomas Steven	Australia	F	2016	10	1	1	2	2	—	—	—	—	—	
Corey Stringer	Australia	D	2015–2017	46	1	8	9	4	—	—	—	—	—	
Matt Stringer	Australia	F	2011–2017	168	18	22	40	48	3	0	1	1	0	
John Sullivan	United States	F	2012	3	2	1	3	4	—	—	—	—	—	
Michael Thornburn	Australia	F	2011–2012	3	0	2	2	0	—	—	—	—	—	
Byron Tschuma	Australia	F	2016–2017	18	0	1	1	0	—	—	—	—	—	
Vadim Virjassov	Australia	F	2012–2013, 2015–2017	110	40	45	85	99	1	0	0	0	0	
Tom Voller	Australia	F	2013–2017	42	2	3	5	2	—	—	—	—	—	
Jack Wolgemuth	United States	D	2013–2014	51	20	47	67	125	2	0	2	2	6	2014 AIHL Defenceman of the Year
Phil Youngclaus	United States	D	2011	18	3	13	16	34	—	—	—	—	—	
