= Australian Capital Territory Ice Hockey Association =

Australian ice hockey governing body

- Sport: Ice hockey
- Jurisdiction: Australian Capital Territory
- Founded: 4 August 1980
- Affiliation: Ice Hockey Australia
- Headquarters: Weston, ACT
- President: Adrian Miller
- Secretary: Dorothy Kocsi

Official website
- www.ihact.org.au
- (Australia)
- (Australian Capital Territory)

The Australian Capital Territory Ice Hockey Association, currently trading as Ice Hockey ACT is the governing body of ice hockey in the Australian Capital Territory, Australia. The Australian Capital Territory Ice Hockey Association is a branch of Ice Hockey Australia.

== History ==
=== 1980: Formation ===
The Evening of 4 August 1980 was the date of a meeting held at the Hughes Community Center where it was decided that an Ice Hockey Association was to be established in the Australian Capital Territory and a steering committee was formed on this evening to establish the association. The meeting was attended by 30 people, several of which were members of the Australian Ice Hockey Federation including: John Purcell (AIHF President), AIHF secretary and AIHF Development officer. The committee was formed with 8 people, one of which was John Slater who was the person that organised the meeting and was also a former A-grade ice hockey player from Melbourne. The steering committees purpose was to organise coaching facilities and create a constitution for the new association that they proposed for the middle of September that year when the Phillip Ice Skating Centre was to be finished and opened to the public. The plan was to form 4 teams consisting of under 21 and pee wee players with the aim to concentrate on development rather than focus on competition.

The inaugural meeting to elect the first committee was held at Phillip Ice Rink on 28 January 1981 scheduled after registration for 6:00pm. The Association and players were divided into 4 districts – Belconnen, Canberra North, Canberra South and Woden.

=== The First Team ===
The first ice hockey club established within the Australian Capital Territory Ice Hockey Association was the Polar Bears who competed in the 1981 season against a team formed by other players called Grizzly Bears, formed for the purpose of being able to have a team for the Polar Bears to compete against for exhibitions and competition matches. The association aimed to form 3 teams for the 1982 season representing Belconnen, Woden and Central. The Belconnen club would largely consist of the existing Polar Bears ice hockey club. The last game of the 1981 ice hockey in the ACT season was held at 4:30pm on 29 November 1981 and was between the Canberra Knights and the New South Wales premiership team Finn Eagles.

== President's Bicentennial Ice Hockey Championship ==
Between 11 and 17 September 1988, a 4 team international championship was held at the Phillip Ice Rink where teams from Canada, United States of America and Australia would compete. Members of the Iowa State Cyclones and former National Hockey League Teen Ranch All Stars would partake in the championship against the Australian National team and the Canberra Knights. Former players from the Toronto Maple Leafs, Quebec Nordiques and Winnipeg Jets would visit and help prepare the Australian National team for the IIHF Pool C Championship being held the following year in Sydney.

=== Championship ===
Game	Date	Time	Away	Score	Home	Location	Attendance	Recap
1	11 September 1988		Canberra Knights	2–0	Iowa State Cyclones	Phillip Ice Skating Centre	–	
2	11 September 1988		Australian National Men	1–3	Teen Ranch	Phillip Ice Skating Centre	–	
3	12 September 1988		Australian National Men	4–0	Canberra Knights	Phillip Ice Skating Centre	–	
4	12 September 1988		Iowa State Cyclones	1–2	Teen Ranch	Phillip Ice Skating Centre	–	
SF	September 1988	5:30pm	Iowa State Cyclones	2–3	Australian National Men	Phillip Ice Skating Centre	–	
GF	17 September 1988		Teen Ranch	4–1	Australian National Men	Phillip Ice Skating Centre	–	

=== Teams ===
==== Australian National Team ====
- Ron Black (Goaltender)
- Elliot Mann
- Craig Hutchinson
- Dave Allen

==== Canberra Knights ====
- Mark Taylor (Goaltender)
- Shawn McGuiggan
- Steven Bugden
- Con Dionissiou
- Lindsay Dyck
- Brett Hienrich
- Laing Harrow
- Owen Kenyon
- Josh Moses
- Jerry Maatouk
- Russ Johnson
- Simon Wheaton
- Martin Hilherst
- Phil Ross
- Mike Harrow
- Richard Peterson
- Chuck Naish
- Keray Benoit
- Scott Marshall
- Dean Pollock
- Jeff Hesschel

==== Iowa University Cyclones ====
- Peter Boyle (Goaltender)
- Richard Motteram
- Murdoch
- Gold

==== Teen Ranch ====
- Dave Tataryn (Goaltender)
- Dave Burrows

== Background ==
The Australian Capital Territory Ice Hockey Association (ACTIHA) was formed as the Australian Capital Territory's branch for Ice Hockey Australia. It is responsible for organising the nine territory leagues across the five different age groups. It is also responsible for selecting teams to compete in the national tournaments.

The ACTIHA also runs a hockey academy for beginners. It runs for seven sessions over two months and at the completion of the program players are filtered into an age and skill appropriate league. ACTIHA operates its leagues out of the Phillip Ice Rink.

== Leagues ==
- Senior A – the top senior league in the ACT
- Senior B – the second tier senior league that employs a non-checking rule
- Senior C – the third tier senior league that employs a non-checking rule. Along with the Senior D league it replaced the former Mixed Hockey League
- Senior D – the fourth tier senior league, also employing a non-checking rule
- Women – an open women's league for players 14 and over
- Midgets – junior league open to players 18 and under
- Bantams – junior league open to players 15 and under
- Peewees – junior league open to players 13 and under
- Atoms – junior league open to players 11 and under

== Presidents ==
- 1981 – John Slater
- 1982 – John Slater
- 1986 – Chris Kenyon
- 1988 – Chris Kenyon
- 2016 – Al McLean
- 2017 – Tanya Brunt
- 2022 – Adrian Miller

== See also ==
- Ice Hockey Australia
