= Mortgage Choice =

Mortgage Choice Limited
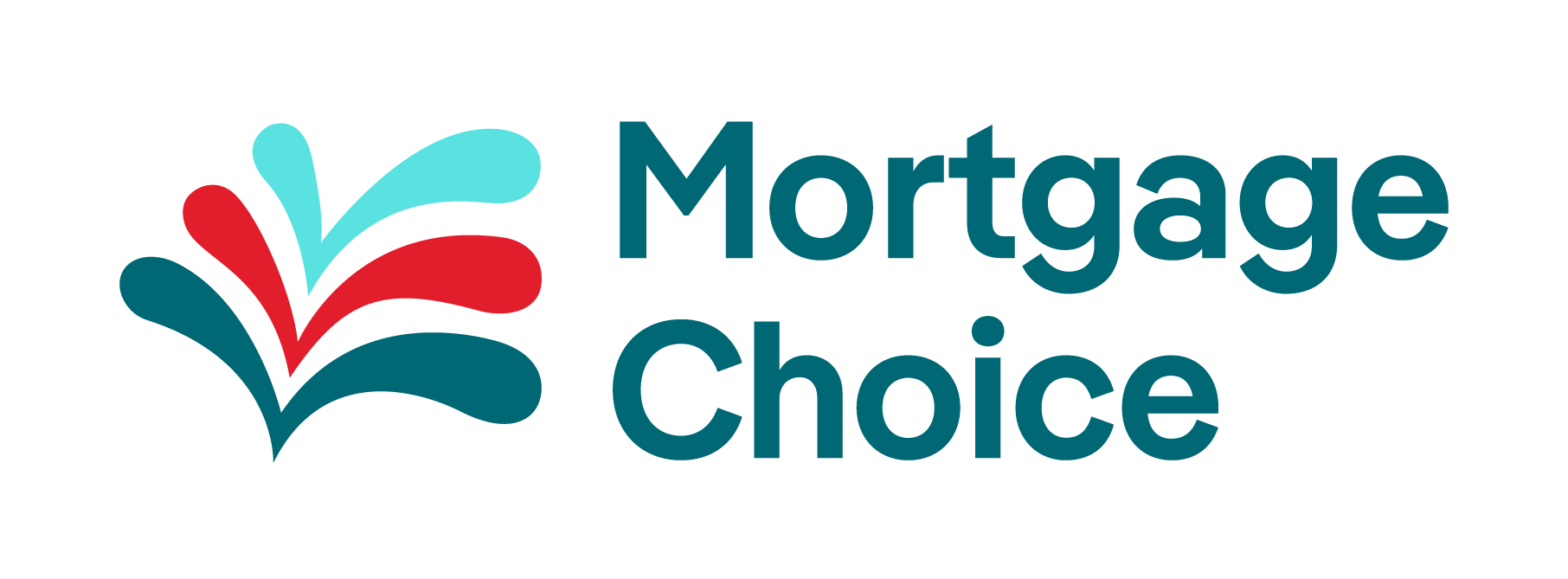
- Traded as: ASX: REA
- Founded: 1992
- Founder: Rodney Higgins & Peter Higgins
- Fate: Acquired by REA Group
- Headquarters: Sydney, Australia
- Area served: Australia
- Key people: Vicki Allan (Chairman); Anthony Waldron (CEO)
- Services: Mortgage broking
- Website: www.mortgagechoice.com.au

Mortgage Choice Limited, commonly known as Mortgage Choice, is an Australian mortgage broking firm.

Mortgage Choice is a current member of the Franchise Council of Australia as well as the Mortgage & Finance Association of Australia; and holds a credit licence (number 382869) issued by ASIC.

Mortgage Choice was listed on the Australian Securities Exchange until it was acquired by REA Group in 2021.

== History ==
The company was founded in 1992 in Sydney by Rod Higgins and Peter Higgins. After two years in operation, the company became a franchisor in 1994 by selling its first franchise license in Wollongong. That grew to a national footprint in 1996.

In 1998 Mortgage Choice launched a website and ran its first TV advertisement one year later.

In 2004, the company officially listed on the Australian Stock Exchange.

In 2008, it launched a diversified product offering, commencing with mortgage protection insurance; in 2011 that offering runs across commercial and personal loans, asset finance and risk and general insurances.

In 2009, Mortgage Choice acquired mortgage aggregator LoanKit. This re-launched in 2010 as the company's aggregation arm.

In 2010, Mortgage Choice acquired Australian home loan and insurance comparison website HelpMeChoose.com.au; and launched its first white label product bluegum™ home loans.

In 2012, Mortgage Choice launched Mortgage Choice Financial Planning.

In 2016, Mortgage Choice expanded its product offering by launching a branded asset finance offering.

In 2018, Mortgage Choice announced the introduction of a new franchisee remuneration model that would give franchisees a bigger share of trail commissions, via a system in which franchisees can receive commissions based on either their new lending, or existing loans.

In 2021, Mortgage Choice was acquired by REA Group, amalgamating the lesser-known REA Group-owned Smartline broker franchise into the Mortgage Choice brand. The acquisition increased Mortgage Choice's presence to 940+ brokers & 720+ franchises across Australia, as well as increasing the total lending partners to 40+.

== Operations ==
In Australia, Mortgage Choice is a national financial services company with a customer base in excess of 350,000 and a residential home loan panel of over 40 lenders.

The head office is in Sydney, with state offices in Brisbane, Melbourne, Adelaide and Perth.
