= South Australia Ice Hockey Association =

South Australian Ice Hockey Association
- Sport: Ice Hockey
- Jurisdiction: South Australia
- Abbreviation: IHSA
- Affiliation: Ice Hockey Australia
- Location: Adelaide - South Australia
- President: Christian Knott

Official website
- www.icehockeysa.com.au
- (Australia)
- (South Australia)

The South Australian Ice Hockey Association, currently trading as Ice Hockey South Australia is the governing body of ice hockey in South Australia, Australia. The South Australia Ice Hockey Association is a Member Association (MA) of Ice Hockey Australia.

== Background ==
The South Australian Ice Hockey Association (SAIHA) was formed as the South Australian state branch for Ice Hockey Australia. It is responsible for organising the five state leagues across the three different age groups. It is also responsible for selecting the state teams to compete in the national tournaments.

IHSA operates its leagues out of the Ice Arena in Thebarton, Adelaide, South Australia. Teams are fielded in the leagues by five winter league clubs – the Falcons Ice Hockey Club, Blackhawks Ice Hockey Club, Redwings Ice Hockey Club, Tigers Ice Hockey Club, Jokers Ice Hockey Club and also available to the semi-retired players is the Adelaide Vintage Reds Ice Hockey Club. The Association's current President is Christian Knott.

== Leagues ==
- Premier League – the top senior checking league in South Australia
- Senior A – the top senior non-checking league in South Australia
- Senior B – the second tier senior non-checking league in South Australia
- Senior C – the third tier senior non-checking league in South Australia
- Grade A Junior – the top junior league in South Australia
- Grade B Junior – the second tier junior league
- Grade C Junior – the third tier junior league
- Bantam Division – junior league open to players 16 and under
- Peewee Division – junior league open to players 13 and under

== 2020 Teams ==
Teams playing in the 2020 season:

Premier League

- Adelaide Blackhawks
- Adelaide Falcons
- Adelaide Redwings
- Adelaide Jokers

Senior A

- Adelaide Blackhawks
- Adelaide Falcons
- Adelaide Redwings
- Adelaide Tigers
- Adelaide Jokers

Senior B

- Adelaide Blackhawks
- Adelaide Falcons
- Adelaide Redwings
- Adelaide Tigers
- Adelaide Jokers

Senior C (Winter)

- Adelaide Blackhawks
- Adelaide Falcons
- Adelaide Redwings
- Adelaide Tigers
- Adelaide Jokers

== See also ==
- Ice Hockey Australia
- Australian Women's Ice Hockey League
- Australian Junior Ice Hockey League
