= Chris Yule =

Canadian-born Japanese ice hockey player

- Born: March 29, 1975 (age 50) Edmonton, Alberta, Canada
- Height: 5 ft 8 in (173 cm)
- Weight: 179 lb (81 kg; 12 st 11 lb)
- Position: Centre
- Shoots: Left
- ALH team Former teams: Nippon Paper Cranes; ALH; Kokudo, renamed Seibu Prince Rabbits
- National team: Japan
- NHL draft: Undrafted
- Playing career: 1994–present

Chris Yule (born March 29, 1975) is a Canadian-born Japanese former professional ice hockey player. He played in Japan with Nippon Paper Cranes of the Asia League Ice Hockey. As of the 2011–2012 ALIH season he holds the record for most goals scored by a single player in their career.

Yule, who was born in Edmonton, Alberta, competed at the 1998 Winter Olympics as a member of the Japan men's national ice hockey team. He has also played with Team Japan at the 1999, 2000, 2001, 2002, 2003, and 2004 IIHF World Championships.
