= Phillip Ice Skating Centre =

Public sports venue in ACT, Australia

- Brave Cave

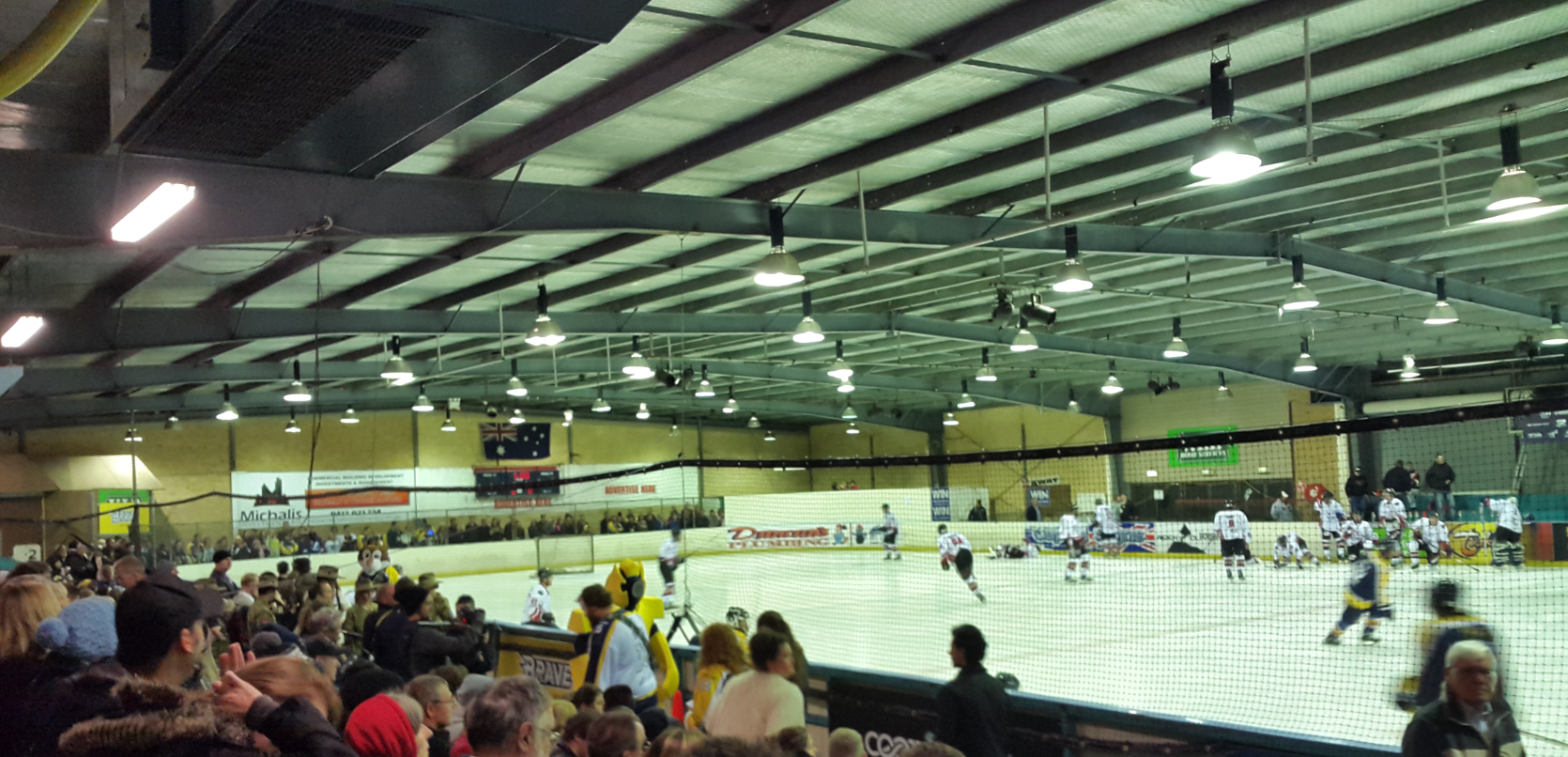
- Interactive map of Phillip Ice Skating Centre
- Location: 1 Irving Street, Phillip, ACT, 2606
- Coordinates: 35.33950°S 149.08366°E
- Capacity: 1000 (seating + standing)
- Surface: 55 metres × 25 metres

Construction
- Opened: October 1980 (46 years ago); Official opening held in May 1981

Tenants
- CBR Brave (2014–present); Canberra Pirates (2016-present); Canberra Knights (1981–2014)

Website
- www.swimskate.com.au

The Phillip Swimming and Ice Skating Centre is an ice sports, public swimming and ice rink centre. The Phillip pool opened in 1970 and the Ice Rink was built and opened in 1980. It is located in Phillip a suburb of Woden Valley, Canberra, ACT, Australia. It is the current home of the CBR Brave AIHL ice hockey team and the Canberra Pirates national women's tier two ice hockey team. It was the previous home of the Canberra Knights AIHL ice hockey team between 1981-2014. The Phillip Ice Skating Centre is the older of the two ice rinks in the ACT.

== History ==
The Phillip Pool opened on Saturday 16 October 1971 by the National Capital Development Commission for the new District of Woden Valley at a cost of $300,000. The site was leased to a company called Glencora Pty Ltd in 1979 which as part of the lease submission, planned to build an Olympic size ice rink. Given the high cost to heating the pool at the time with oil heaters, the heat generated from the Ice rink refrigeration system is used to heat the surrounding pools.

The Phillip Ice Skating Centre (on the same site as the Phillip pool) opened to the public in October 1980, with the opening ceremony held in May 1981.

On 4 October 2012, the private owner of the centre revealed they were open to working with developers to reconfiguring the site so that the outdoor pools went inside, a new ice rink would be built and a boutique hotel constructed on the block.

On 16 August 2014, ACT Sports Minister, Shane Rattenbury, formally rejected a proposal to build a brand new ice rink attached to the new swimming complex planned for the Molonglo Valley in Canberra's south. Mr Rattenbury's reasons for his decision came from a feasibility study into the proposal ruling out the investment into a second ice rink for a city due to the population size of Canberra at this time. Instead the minister proposed further review of what can be done to upgrade the current privately owned Phillip Ice Centre facility. Brave co-director, Warren Apps, responded to the news on the ACT Grandstand radio program on 666 ABC Canberra by further expressing the need for new investment due to the demand on the current facility now exceeding its capacity. With the CBR Brave struggling to secure enough training time on the ice at Phillip due to all the other sporting and recreational commitments on the facility.

On 17 January 2016, the ACT Government released a detailed report into ACT Indoor Sports facilities that again raised the issue of ice sports and the Phillip Ice Skating Centre. The report highlighted the issues of having an old private facility at the end of its lifespan servicing a growing ice sports community and national sports franchise in the national capital. The report suggested a full business case and plan be drawn up at exploring alternative options for building a new multi-purpose facility in the fastest growing areas of Canberra, the Molonglo Valley and Gungahlin, where the lower land values can boost a feasibility case for construction compared to re-building in Phillip. Shane Rattenbury responded to the release of the report by saying a new ice sports facility with duel rinks for competition and practice was in the Government's longer-term plans but stressed the need for community engagement and private sector support. CBR Brave part-owner, Peter Chamberlain, concurred with the recommendations of the report in relation to ice sports.

On 26 August 2016, ACT Labor made the announcement as part of their 2016 election campaign that they would pledge to build a new ice sports centre in the south of Canberra as part of a $23.3m four-year plan to upgrade sporting facilities territory wide if re-elected. This policy announcement was made in response to the ACT Indoor Sports Facilities Report commissioned by the government earlier in the year. Initially $75,000 would be spent in conjunction with the Ice Sports Federation on a community consultation program to determine what the community feels is needed and where exactly the facility should be located. Ice Hockey ACT (IHACT) welcomed the commitment announcement by the ACT Government to building a new ice sports facility with IHACT's president, Allan McLean, commenting "We are very excited at the thought of playing ice hockey in a new, larger facility with the potential to grow our sport,".

On 19 February 2019, the ACT Government commissioned options paper for a new ice facility for Canberra was released by Lockbridge on behalf of the ACT Ice Sports Federation. The paper outlined three options for a new facility in Canberra. The three options looked at in the report included a twin-sheet facility planned over two levels, a twin-sheet facility planned over one level and a single-rink facility planned over two levels. The projected price range between the three options spanned between $22.6 million to $35.4 million. All three options did not meet IHACT seating capacity requirements of 2000 seating and 500 standing as outlined in the IHACT function brief. The two-story options provided 1200 seating and 400 standing capacity with the single-story option providing a 600 seating and 200 standing capacity. All three options included space for the establishment of the Australian Ice Sports Hall of Fame.

In response to the release of the options paper, the ACT Government announced it would establish a tender process, in the first quarter of 2019, to seek a private partner for the project. The ACT Sports Minister spokesman reiterated the Chief Minister’s promise to start construction by 2020 and advised the ACT Government had put money aside in the budget for the project.

== Facilities ==
All facilities are located on a single level, barring a small mezzanine level with some seating and the bar serving alcoholic beverages, usually open during Canberra Brave home games only. Until June 2018, the rink was renowned nationally for its lack of hand dryers in the bathrooms. As of 22 June 2018, news broke rapidly of a fresh install of working hand dryers, breaking the long drought. A full list of facilities is as follows:

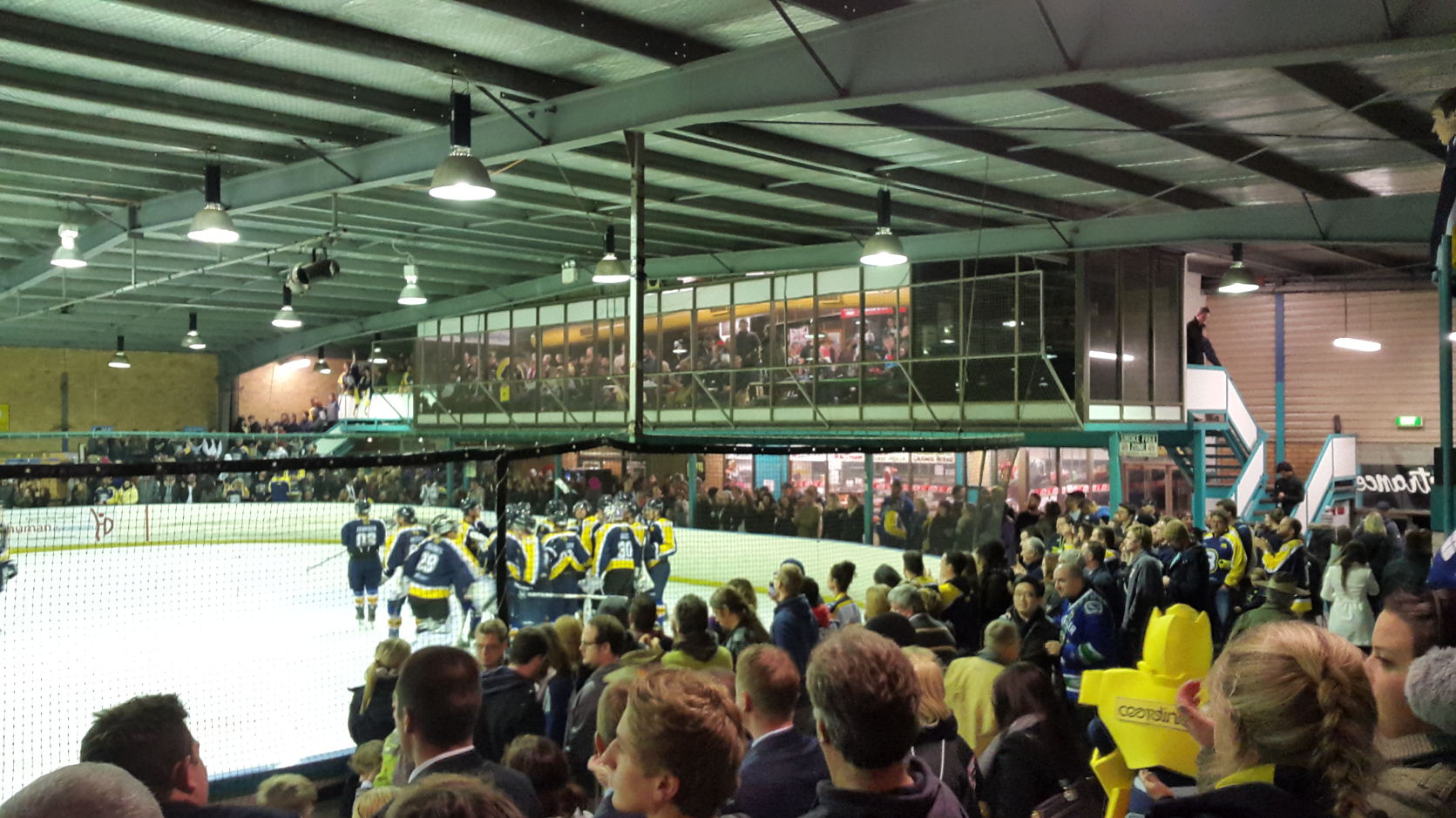
Game-day experience at the Brave Cave, opening night of the 2015 AIHL season CBR Brave vs Sydney Bears, CBR Brave winning, 4–2

- 55m × 25m ice rink (nets are used around the rink to stop ice pucks with no plexi-glass)
- Seating and standing room for spectators (approx 1,000 people)
- Skate hire
- Kiosk with hot and cold food and drink
- Bar (located on the mezzanine level)
- Public toilets
- Disabled toilets
- Outdoor parking, including disabled parking
- Kerb set down and pick-up area with ramp
- First aid equipment on site

== Events ==
Phillip Ice Skating Centre is the former home of the CBR Brave since an agreement was struck between the AIHL club and the centre's manager John Raut on 1 March 2014. The centre plays host to at least 14 home Brave matches a season since the 2014 AIHL season between the months of April to August.

The centre regularly hosts discos on Friday nights for all age groups and can be booked by schools for carnivals.

== See also ==
- List of ice rinks in Australia
- Sport in the Australian Capital Territory
