= 2018 CBR Brave season =

2018 CBR Brave
- Goodall Cup champions
- League: 1st AIHL
- 2018 record: 24–0–0–4
- Home record: 12–0–0–2
- Road record: 12–0–0–2
- Goals for: 152
- Goals against: 74

Team information
- Coach: (Australia) Robert Starke
- Assistant coach: (Australia) Mike Sargeant (Canada) Gordon Cocknell
- Captain: (New Zealand) Matthew Harvey
- Alternate captains: (Australia) Wehebe Darge (Australia) Kai Miettinen (Australia) Jordan Gavin
- Arena: Phillip Ice Skating Centre

Team leaders
- Goals: (United States) Trevor Gerling (24)
- Assists: (United States) Trevor Gerling (43)
- Points: (United States) Trevor Gerling (67)
- Penalty minutes: (Australia) Per Daniel Göransson (65)
- Goals against average: (Canada) Matt Hewitt (1.95)

The 2018 CBR Brave season was the Brave's 5th season in the Australian Ice Hockey League since being founded and entering the league in 2014. The season ran from 21 April 2018 to 2 September 2018 for the Brave. CBR finished first in the regular season to clinch their maiden H Newman Reid Trophy. The team set then AIHL records for most wins and points in a season. The Brave completed the double and claimed their first Goodall Cup trophy and the AIHL Championship in Melbourne in September. CBR defeated the Melbourne Mustangs in the first semi-final 5–1 before overcoming the Sydney Bears in the final 4–3 with an overtime winner scored by Trevor Gerling. The Brave became the first Canberra based ice hockey franchise to lift the Goodall Cup and the second Canberra based team overall, following the ACT representative team's victory in 1998. Canberra Brave's Dave and Jayden Lewis became the first father-son duo in Australian Ice Hockey League history to lift the Goodall Cup. American import forward, Trevor Gerling, finished equal top points scorer in the league. Canadian import goaltender, Matt Hewitt, finished top in the league goaltender standings and Australian international, Wahebe Darge, won the AIHL best local player award for 2018. Foundation player, Jordie Gavin who was instrumental in building the CBR Brave following the collapse of the Canberra Knights, retired after the 2018 AIHL final.

== Roster ==
Team roster for the 2018 AIHL season

2018 AIHL CBR Brave Roster
#	Nat	Name	Pos	S/G	Age	Acquired	Birthplace
4	(Canada)	Channing Bresciani	D	L	33	2018	Winnipeg, Manitoba, Canada
71	(Australia)	Jordan Brunt	F	L	26	2015	Canberra, Australian Capital Territory, Australia
25	(Australia)	Matt Buskas	D	R	41–42	2017	Edmonton, Alberta, Canada
17	(Australia)	James Byers	D	R	32	2014	Perth, Western Australia, Australia
9	(Australia)	Wehebe Darge (A)	LW/RW	L	34	2017	Adelaide, South Australia, Australia
20	(Australia)	Hayden Dawes	RW	R	32	2018	Stony Plain, Alberta, Canada
31	(Australia)	Jakob Doornbos	G	L	25	2018	Canberra, Australian Capital Territory, Australia
31	(Australia)	Nickolas Eckhardt	G	L	36	2014	Canberra, Australian Capital Territory, Australia
26	(Australia)	Darcy Flanagan	D	R	27	2018	Melbourne, Australia
19	(Australia)	Jordan Gavin (A)	F	R	43	2014	Canberra, Australian Capital Territory, Australia
78	(United States)	Trevor Gerling	RW	R	36	2018	Seattle, Washington, United States
59	(Australia)	Per Daniel Göransson	D	L	40	2018	Stockholm, Sweden
81	(New Zealand)	Matthew Harvey (C)	D	R	40	2014	Calgary, Alberta, Canada
3	(Australia)	Mitchell Henning	F	R	28	2016	Brisbane, Queensland, Australia
92	(Canada)	Mat Hewitt	G	L	33	2018	Coquitlam, British Columbia, Canada
24	(Australia)	Joseph Hughes	RW	R	42	2018	Springvale, Victoria, Australia
7	(Australia)	Bayley Kubara	D	R	27	2017	Wombarra, New South Wales, Australia
15	(Australia)	Casey Kubara	RW	R	30	2016	Wombarra, New South Wales, Australia
16	(Australia)	Tyler Kubara	F	R	31	2015	Wombarra, New South Wales, Australia
48	(Canada)	Chris Leveille	RW	L	39	2018	Guelph, Ontario, Canada
11	(Australia)	David Lewis	F	L	48	2018	Canberra, Australian Capital Territory, Australia
14	(Australia)	Jayden Lewis	F	R	27	2018	Canberra, Australian Capital Territory, Australia
6	(Australia)	Christopher McPhail	D/F	L	35	2017	Canberra, Australian Capital Territory, Australia
64	(Australia)	Kai Miettinen (A)	F	L	30	2014	Canberra, Australian Capital Territory, Australia
66	(Latvia)	Ainars Podzins	LW/C	R	34	2018	Jūrmala, Latvia
12	(Australia)	Mark Rummukainen	D	R	44	2014	Canberra, Australian Capital Territory, Australia
35	(Australia)	Alexandre Tetreault	G	L	27–28	2015	Montreal, Quebec, Canada
29	(Australia)	Tynan Theobald	G	L	30	2018	Melbourne, Australia

== Transfers ==
All the player transfers in and out by the CBR Brave for the 2018 AIHL season.

=== In ===
Pos	Player	Transferred From	Local / Import
D	(Canada) Channing Bresciani	(Canada) University of Manitoba	Import
W	(Australia) Hayden Dawes	(United States) Lindenwood University	Local
G	(Australia) Jakob Doornbos	(Australia) Sydney Wolf Pack	Local
D	(Australia) Darcy Flanagan	(Australia) Melbourne Ice	Local
W	(United States) Trevor Gerling	(France) LHC Les Lions	Import
D	(Australia) Per Daniel Göransson	(Australia) Perth Thunder	Local
G	(Canada) Mat Hewitt	(Canada) University of British Columbia	Import
F	(Australia) Joseph Hughes	(Australia) Melbourne Ice	Local
W	(Canada) Chris Leveille	(Canada) Brampton Beast	Import
F	(Australia) David Lewis	No team	Local
F	(Australia) Jayden Lewis	(Finland) KaKiPo U20	Local
W	(Latvia) Ainars Podzins	(United Kingdom) Edinburgh Capitals	Import
G	(Australia) Tynan Theobald	(Canada) London Lakers	Local

=== Out ===
Pos	Player	Transferred To	Local / Import
C	(Australia) Brian Bales	No team	Local
F	(Australia) Corey Banks	No team	Local
W	(Canada) Stephen Blunden	(United States) Northern Federals	Import
D	(Canada) Dominic Jalbert	(France) Anglet Hormadi Élite	Import
F	(Australia) Toby Kubara	No team	Local
F	(Australia) Tom Letki	No team	Local
F	(Australia) Matti Luoma	No team	Local
D	(Australia) Luke Philps	No team	Local
D	(Czech Republic) Jan Safar	(France) Remparts de Tours	Import
G	(Australia) Aleksi Toivonen	(Australia) Melbourne Mustangs	Local
F	(Canada) Geordie Wudrick	(Australia) Sydney Ice Dogs	Import

== Staff ==
Staff Roster for 2018 AIHL season

2018 AIHL CBR Brave Staff
Role	Staff
Head coach	(Australia) Robert Starke
Assistant coach	(Australia) Mike Sargeant
Assistant coach	(Canada) Gordon Cocknell
Director of Player Development and Personnel	(Sweden) Johan Steenberg
Team Manager	(Australia) Andrew Deans
Equipment Manager	(Australia) Darryl Day
Chiropractor	(Australia) Saara Stevenson
Sports Trainer	(Australia) Cameron Mohr
Personal Trainer	(Australia) Alex Zeitlhofer
Personal Trainer	(Australia) Dylan Swan
Bench official	(Australia) Darren Sault
Bench official	(Australia) Kelly Sault

== Standings ==
=== Regular season ===
Summary

Season	Overall										Home								Away							
Season	P	W	L	OW	OL	GF	GA	GD	Pts	Finish	P	W	L	OW	OL	GF	GA	GD	P	W	L	OW	OL	GF	GA	GD
2018	28	24	4	0	0	152	74	+78	72	1st	14	12	2	0	0	76	35	+41	14	12	2	0	0	76	39	+37

Position by round

Round	1	2	3	4	5	6	7	8	9	10	11	12	13	14	15	16	17	18
Position	2	1	2	1	1	1	1	1	1	1	1	1	1	1	1	1	1	1

Updated to match(es) played on Completed. Source: www.icehockeynewsaustralia.com

League table

Team	GP	W	SOW	SOL	L	GF	GA	GDF	PTS
CBR Brave	28	24	0	0	4	152	74	+78	72
Sydney Bears	28	15	3	3	7	104	72	+32	54
Perth Thunder	28	12	4	2	10	111	100	+11	46
Melbourne Mustangs	28	12	2	2	12	106	97	+9	42
Newcastle Northstars	28	9	4	4	11	106	119	–13	39
Sydney Ice Dogs	28	10	3	2	13	96	97	–1	38
Melbourne Ice	28	7	2	4	15	87	114	–27	29
Adelaide Adrenaline	28	3	2	3	20	62	151	–89	16

Qualified for the Goodall Cup playoffs	H Newman Reid Trophy winners

=== Finals ===
Summary

Season	Finals weekend							
Season	P	W	L	GF	GA	Result	Semi-final	Goodall Cup final
2018	2	2	–	9	4	Champion	Won 5-1 (Mustangs)	Won 4-3 (OT) (Bears)

Bracket

Semi-finals
1	CBR Brave	5
4	Melbourne Mustangs	1
3	Perth Thunder	0
2	Sydney Bears	3

Final
CBR Brave	4
Sydney Bears	3

== Schedule & results ==
=== Regular season ===
Matchday	1	2	3	4	5	6	7	8	9	10	11	12	13	14	15	16	17	18	19	20	21	22	23	24	25	26	27	28
Arena	H	A	H	A	A	H	H	H	H	A	A	H	H	A	A	A	A	H	H	H	H	A	A	H	A	H	A	A
Result	W	W	W	L	W	W	L	W	W	W	W	L	W	W	W	W	L	W	W	W	W	W	W	W	W	W	W	W

Updated to match(es) played on Completed. Source: AIHL
A = Away; H = Home; W = Win; L = Loss

2018 fixtures and results
Date	Time	Away	Score	Home	Location	Recap
21 April	17:30	Sydney Bears	2–4	CBR Brave	Phillip Ice Skating Centre	
28 April	17:00	CBR Brave	4–2	Newcastle Northstars	Hunter Ice Skating Stadium	
5 May	17:30	Newcastle Northstars	3–8	CBR Brave	Phillip Ice Skating Centre	
6 May	17:00	CBR Brave	3–5	Sydney Bears	Macquarie Ice Rink	
12 May	17:00	CBR Brave	3–1	Sydney Bears	Macquarie Ice Rink	
19 May	17:30	Perth Thunder	2–6	CBR Brave	Phillip Ice Skating Centre	
20 May	17:00	Perth Thunder	4–3	CBR Brave	Phillip Ice Skating Centre	
26 May	17:00	Melbourne Ice	0–5	CBR Brave	Phillip Ice Skating Centre	
27 May	17:00	Melbourne Ice	1–4	CBR Brave	Phillip Ice Skating Centre	
16 June	16:30	CBR Brave	11–4	Adelaide Adrenaline	Adelaide Ice Arena	
17 June	16:30	CBR Brave	5–2	Perth Thunder	Perth Ice Arena	
23 June	17:30	Melbourne Mustangs	4–1	CBR Brave	Phillip Ice Skating Centre	
24 June	17:00	Melbourne Mustangs	4–8	CBR Brave	Phillip Ice Skating Centre	
30 June	16:30	CBR Brave	6–2	Perth Thunder	Perth Ice Arena	
1 July	16:30	CBR Brave	6–2	Adelaide Adrenaline	Adelaide Ice Arena	
7 July	17:00	CBR Brave	7–5	Melbourne Mustangs	O'Brien Group Arena	
8 July	16:00	CBR Brave	3–6	Melbourne Mustangs	O'Brien Group Arena	
14 July	17:30	Newcastle Northstars	1–3	CBR Brave	Phillip Ice Skating Centre	
21 July	17:30	Sydney Bears	2–7	CBR Brave	Phillip Ice Skating Centre	
28 July	17:30	Adelaide Adrenaline	2–5	CBR Brave	Phillip Ice Skating Centre	
29 July	14:00	Adelaide Adrenaline	0–6	CBR Brave	Phillip Ice Skating Centre	
4 August	17:00	CBR Brave	6–3	Sydney Ice Dogs	Macquarie Ice Rink	
5 August	16:00	CBR Brave	6–4	Newcastle Northstars	Hunter Ice Skating Stadium	
11 August	17:30	Sydney Ice Dogs	8–11	CBR Brave	Phillip Ice Skating Centre	
18 August	17:00	CBR Brave	3–1	Sydney Ice Dogs	Macquarie Ice Rink	
19 August	17:00	Sydney Ice Dogs	2–5	CBR Brave	Phillip Ice Skating Centre	
25 August	17:00	CBR Brave	7–0	Melbourne Ice	O'Brien Group Arena	
26 August	16:30	CBR Brave	6–2	Melbourne Ice	O'Brien Group Arena	

=== Finals ===
Goodall Cup semi-final

1 September 2018; 15:00	Melbourne Mustangs	1–5 (0–2, 1–3, 0–0)	CBR Brave	O'Brien Group Arena; Attendance: 1500

Game reference

Aleksi Toivonen
Goalies
Matt Hewitt
Referees:
Jeff Scott
Kent Unwin
Linesmen:
Casper Russelhuber
Grainge Phillips

	0 – 1	3:16 – Gerling (PP) (Bresciani, Leveille)
	0 – 2	8:08 – C.Kubara (unassisted)
	0 – 3	19.48 – Gerling (SH) (Leveille)
20:44 – Ferguson (Davies, McMahon)	1 – 3
	1 – 4	28.09 – C.Kubara (Dawes)
	1 – 5	29:00 – Harvey (Gerling, Darge)

8 min
Penalties
28 min
24
Shots
17

Goodall Cup final

2 September 2018; 15:00	Sydney Bears	3–4 (OT) (0–2, 3–0, 0–1, 0–1)	CBR Brave	O'Brien Group Arena; Attendance: 1500

Game reference

Anthony Kimlin
Goalies
Matt Hewitt
Referees:
Jeff Scott
Kent Unwin
Linesmen:
Casper Russelhuber
Fraser Ohlson

	0 – 1	5:08 – T.Kubara (Henning, Miettinen)
	0 – 2	9:57 – Hughes (PP) (Darge)
20:01 – Schlamp (PP) (Strukoff, Lough)	1 – 2
23:50 – Clare (du Toit, Lough)	2 – 2
28:48 – Lough (Adams, Funes)	3 – 2
	3 – 3	35:09 – Leveille (Darge, Bresciani)
	3 – 4	61:39 – Gerling (Darge)

2 min
Penalties
4 min
37
Shots
37

== Player statistics ==
=== Skaters ===
Regular season
Nat	Player	Pos	M	G	A	P	PIM
(Canada)	Channing Bresciani	D	24	3	42	45	48
(Australia)	Jordan Brunt	F	19	0	3	3	2
(Australia)	Matt Buskas	D	10	1	0	1	27
(Australia)	James Byers	D	19	1	5	6	14
(Australia)	Wehebe Darge	W	26	22	34	56	34
(Australia)	Hayden Dawes	W	19	13	15	28	24
(Australia)	Darcy Flanagan	D	15	0	1	1	8
(Australia)	Jordan Gavin	F	18	3	1	4	10
(United States)	Trevor Gerling	W	24	24	43	67	12
(Australia)	Per Daniel Göransson	D	21	4	10	14	65
(New Zealand)	Matthew Harvey	D	26	6	15	21	38
(Australia)	Mitchell Henning	F	24	2	10	12	10
(Australia)	Joseph Hughes	W	20	15	16	31	34
(Australia)	Bayley Kubara	D	24	0	6	6	36
(Australia)	Casey Kubara	W	13	7	8	15	4
(Australia)	Tyler Kubara	F	24	3	3	6	18
(Canada)	Chris Leveille	W	15	20	27	47	47
(Australia)	David Lewis	F	20	0	1	1	4
(Australia)	Jayden Lewis	F	20	0	4	4	10
(Australia)	Christopher McPhail	D/F	17	3	1	4	2
(Australia)	Kai Miettinen	F	26	9	12	21	32
(Latvia)	Ainars Podzins	W/C	17	16	19	35	22
(Australia)	Mark Rummukainen	D	9	0	0	0	2

Finals
Nat	Player	Pos	M	G	A	P	PIM
(Canada)	Channing Bresciani	D	2	0	2	2	0
(Australia)	Jordan Brunt	F	1	0	0	0	0
(Australia)	Matt Buskas	D	–				
(Australia)	James Byers	D	2	0	0	0	0
(Australia)	Wehebe Darge	W	2	0	4	4	4
(Australia)	Hayden Dawes	W	2	0	1	1	6
(Australia)	Darcy Flanagan	D	–				
(Australia)	Jordan Gavin	F	1	0	0	0	0
(United States)	Trevor Gerling	W	2	3	1	4	10
(Australia)	Per Daniel Göransson	D	2	0	0	0	0
(New Zealand)	Matthew Harvey	D	2	1	0	1	0
(Australia)	Mitchell Henning	F	2	0	1	1	0
(Australia)	Joseph Hughes	W	2	1	0	1	2
(Australia)	Bayley Kubara	D	2	0	0	0	2
(Australia)	Casey Kubara	W	2	2	0	2	0
(Australia)	Tyler Kubara	F	2	1	0	1	0
(Canada)	Chris Leveille	W	2	1	2	3	0
(Australia)	David Lewis	F	1	0	0	0	2
(Australia)	Jayden Lewis	F	1	0	0	0	0
(Australia)	Christopher McPhail	D/F	1	0	0	0	0
(Australia)	Kai Miettinen	F	2	0	1	1	2
(Latvia)	Ainars Podzins	W/C	–				
(Australia)	Mark Rummukainen	D	1	0	0	0	0

=== Goaltenders ===
Regular season
Nat	Player	Pos	M	G	A	PIM	SO	MP	GA	GAA	SH	SA	SV%
(Australia)	Jakob Doornbos	G	1	0	0	0	0	20	2	5.00	12	10	0.833
(Australia)	Nickolas Eckhardt	G	–										
(Canada)	Mat Hewitt	G	26	0	3	2	2	1182	46	1.95	614	568	0.925
(Australia)	Alexandre Tetreault	G	7	0	0	0	0	189	22	5.82	117	95	0.812
(Australia)	Tynan Theobald	G	1	0	0	0	0	4	3	37.50	5	2	0.400

Finals
Nat	Player	Pos	M	G	A	PIM	SO	MP	GA	GAA	SH	SA	SV%
(Australia)	Nickolas Eckhardt	G	–										
(Australia)	Jakob Doornbos	G	–										
(Canada)	Mat Hewitt	G	2	0	0	0	0	108	5	2.31	66	61	0.924
(Australia)	Alexandre Tetreault	G	–										
(Australia)	Tynan Theobald	G	–										

== Awards ==
Team awards for 2018 season

2018 Brave awards
Award	Recipient
Bravest of the Brave	(United States) Trevor Gerling (Canada) Matt Hewitt
Best Forward	(Canada) Chris Leveille
Best Defenceman	(Canada) Channing Bresciani
Fans Choice	(Canada) Matt Hewitt
Player’s Choice	(Australia) Wehebe Darge
Coach’s Award	(Australia) Kai Miettinen
Emerging Brave	(Australia) Mitchell Henning
John Lewis Memorial Award	(Australia) Darryl Day
Deans Award	(Australia) Tristan Metcalfe

AIHL awards for 2018 season

2018 AIHL awards
Award	Recipient
Local Player of the Year	(Australia) Wehebe Darge
