= 2018 AIHL season =

- League: Australian Ice Hockey League
- Sport: Ice hockey
- Duration: 21 April 2018 – 26 August 2018

Regular season
- H Newman Reid Trophy: CBR Brave (1st title)
- Season MVP: Pier-Olivier Grandmaison (Thunder)
- Top scorer: Trevor Gerling (Brave); Pier-Olivier Grandmaison (Thunder) (67 points)

Goodall Cup
- Champions: CBR Brave
- Runners-up: Sydney Bears
- Finals MVP: Trevor Gerling (Brave)

AIHL seasons
- 2017 2019

The 2018 AIHL season was the 19th season of the Australian Ice Hockey League (AIHL). It ran from 21 April 2018 until 26 August 2018, with the Goodall Cup finals following on 1 and 2 September 2018. The CBR Brave won both the H Newman Reid Trophy after finishing the regular season with the most points in league history, and the Goodall Cup for the first time by defeating the Sydney Bears in the final.

== Teams ==
In 2018 the AIHL had 8 teams competing in the league.

2018 AIHL teams
Team	City	Arena	Head Coach	Captain
Adelaide Adrenaline	(South Australia) Adelaide	IceArenA	(Australia) Jim Fuyarchuk	(Australia) Josef Rezek
CBR Brave	(Australian Capital Territory) Canberra	Phillip Ice Skating Centre	(Australia) Robert Starke	(New Zealand) Matthew Harvey
Melbourne Ice	(Victoria (state)) Melbourne	O'Brien Group Arena	(Sweden) Peter Ekroth	(Australia) Lliam Webster
Melbourne Mustangs	(Victoria (state)) Melbourne	O'Brien Group Arena	(Canada) Maxime Langelier-Parent	(Australia) Michael McMahon
Newcastle Northstars	(New South Wales) Newcastle	Hunter Ice Skating Stadium	*No head coach	(Australia) Robert Malloy
Perth Thunder	(Western Australia) Perth	Perth Ice Arena	(Australia) Dave Ruck	(Australia) Jamie Woodman
Sydney Bears	(New South Wales) Sydney	Macquarie Ice Rink	(Australia) Ron Kuprowsky	(Australia) Michael Schlamp
Sydney Ice Dogs	(New South Wales) Sydney	Macquarie Ice Rink	(Australia) Andrew Petrie	(Australia) Scott Stephenson

== League business ==
In December 2017 the Sydney Ice Dogs released their logo for the 2018 season. The design was an adjusted version of the 15th anniversary logo, replacing the "XV" with a shield. A few days later the Sydney Bears unveiled their new logo featuring a re-designed Bear. Following the release of their new logo the Bears released their new jerseys which included a black home, white away and a red alternate version. In February 2018 the Bears signed All About Caring as a major sponsor for the season. The same month the Melbourne Mustangs signed with The Kodiak Group to be their new naming rights sponsor for the next two seasons. The Kodiak Group replace The James Hotel who held the rights in 2017. In March 2018 the Melbourne Ice signed partnerships with the charity 300 Blankets and not-for-profit Kids Under Cover. Both organisations focus on helping the homeless and part of deal with 300 Blankets will see the Ice selling blankets at their home games. In April the Adelaide Adrenaline signed with Complete Podiatry to be a sponsor and the club's official podiatry clinic. Also in April the Mustangs announced that they had signed with restaurant Billy's District to be their post-game venue, replacing The James Hotel which had been their venue since May 2016. On 8 April the Newcastle Northstars that Warners at the Bay had signed with the club as their official post-game venue for 2018. The Melbourne Ice announced on 10 April that they had signed with Tempur Australia to be their naming rights sponsor for the next three years. The deal also included captain Lliam Webster being appointed as a brand ambassador for Tempur. The Brave announced that The Signal Co. Wireless and Maliganis Edwards Johnson had signed on as major sponsors and Ace High Eatery & Bar, Care Traffic, Coffey, Compass Wealth Group and T C Air & Electric had signed on as business sponsors for 2018. The Brave also switched their post game venue to the Hellenic Club of Canberra's Fillos Taverna + Bar, replacing The Woden Tradies & Quality Hotel which had been their venue since June 2017. In April the Sydney Ice Dogs signed with the Holiday Inn Express Sydney Macquarie Park to be a major sponsor for the 2018 season. They also announced that they would partner with Cheapskate Hockey to create an alternative jersey as well as produce a line of merchandise. The alternate jersey will feature a redesigned bulldog logo. On 20 April the Sydney Ice Dogs announced that The Ranch Hotel would be their post game venue for 2018, replacing TGI Fridays Macquarie Centre which was their venue for the previous season.

=== Exhibition games ===
In January 2018 the Perth Thunder announced that they would hold a three-game exhibition series against an All-Stars team from the China Ice Hockey League. The games were held on 15, 17 and 17 February at the Perth Ice Arena. The Thunder lost the opening game 1–3 but tied the series with a 4–1 in game two. The All-Stars won the series with a 2–1 win in game three. On 7 April the Melbourne Ice and Melbourne Mustangs held their annual exhibition match at the O'Brien Group Arena. The Ice defeated the Mustangs 3–2. The following week the Melbourne Ice hosted the Hockey Festival at the O'Brien Group Arena. The festival ran over 14 and 15 April and included the Ice, Adelaide Adrenaline, CBR Brave and Melbourne Mustangs. Day one of the festival saw each team compete in a round-robin competition in order to determine the playoff spots on day two. The Mustangs finished the round-robin at the top of the standings, one point ahead of the Ice, the Adrenaline finished in third and the Brave in last place. Day two included two games, a final between first and second and a placement game for third place. The Ice defeated the Mustangs 3–2 in the final to claim the Warrior Cup, while the Adrenaline beat the Brave 4–2 to finish in third place.

=== Personnel changes ===
On 15 October the Newcastle Northstars announced that Andrew Petrie had stepped down from the position of head coach following a mutual decision with the club. A month later the Sydney Ice Dogs announced the signing of Petrie as their head coach. Petrie replaced Christopher Blagg who moved into the position of club president. Petrie previously coached the Ice Dogs in 2014. On 14 November the Melbourne Mustangs' announced that head coach Michael Flaherty would not be returning for the 2018 season. Flaherty was replaced two weeks later by Maxime Langelier-Parent, a former import for the club who had served as an assistant coach in 2017. On 10 February the Ice Dogs announced Jason Juba had stepped down from his positions of general manager and vice president in order to focus on family and business. Also in February the CBR Brave announced that they had signed Mike Sargeant and Gordon Cockell as assistant coaches for the 2018 seasons. In April the Adelaide Adrenaline announced that Sami Mantere had stepped down from the position of head coach in order to return full time as a player for the club. Mantere was also signed on as an assistant coach. Mantere was replaced in the position of head coach by Jim Fuyarchuk. On 17 April the Brave announced that they had signed Johan Steenberg as Director of Player Development and Player Personnel. Steenberg was previously at the Melbourne Ice from 2014 to 2017 as their goaltending coach. On 19 April Northstars announced that Joey Theriault, Ray Sheffield and Garry Doré will share the coaching duties for the 2018 season, replacing Andrew Petrie who left in October 2017. Just prior to the start of the season the Melbourne Ice announced the signing of Peter Ekroth to the position of head coach. Ekroth replaced Charles Franzén who has moved into the position of Director of Coaching and Player Development.

=== Player transfers ===
==== Interclub transfers ====
Nat	Player	Previous team	New team	Ref
(Australia)	Dayne Davis	Melbourne Ice	Newcastle Northstars	
(Australia)	James Downie	Sydney Bears	Melbourne Ice	
(Australia)	Darcy Flanagan	Melbourne Ice	CBR Brave	
(Australia)	Per Daniel Göransson	Perth Thunder	CBR Brave	
(Australia)	Robert Haselhurst	Perth Thunder	Newcastle Northstars	
(Australia)	Joseph Hughes	Melbourne Ice	CBR Brave	
(Australia)	Tomas Landa	Sydney Bears	Newcastle Northstars	
(Australia)	Nicholas Mizen	Newcastle Northstars	Sydney Ice Dogs	
(Canada)	Nick Rivait	Sydney Bears	Newcastle Northstars	
(Sweden)	Jonatan Ruth	Newcastle Northstars	Sydney Ice Dogs	
(Australia)	Corey Stringer	Melbourne Mustangs	Adelaide Adrenaline	
(Australia)	Richard Tesarik	Sydney Bears	Newcastle Northstars	
(Australia)	Cameron Todd	Sydney Bears	Sydney Ice Dogs	
(Australia)	Aleksi Toivonen	CBR Brave	Melbourne Mustangs	
(Canada)	Geordie Wudrick	CBR Brave	Sydney Ice Dogs	
(Australia)	Patrick Ward	Sydney Bears	Newcastle Northstars	

==== Retirements ====
Nat	Player	Team	New role	Ref
(Australia)	Paul Baranzelli	Melbourne Ice	—	
(Australia)	Graham Charbonneau	Adelaide Adrenaline	—	
(Australia)	Sean Greer	Adelaide Adrenaline	—	
(Australia)	David Huxley	Adelaide Adrenaline	—	
(Canada)	Maxime Langelier-Parent	Melbourne Mustangs	Head coach of Melbourne Mustangs	
(Australia)	Greg Oddy	Adelaide Adrenaline	—	
(Australia)	Samuel Wilson	Perth Thunder	—	

==== New signings ====
Nat	Player	Previous team	New team	Ref
(Canada)	Alex Adams	Knoxville Ice Bears	Adelaide Adrenaline	
(United States)	Charlie Adams	Pensacola Ice Flyers	Sydney Bears	
(Canada)	Dylan Anderson	Edinburgh Capitals	Melbourne Ice	
(Australia)	Harley Anderson	Southern Stampede	Adelaide Adrenaline	
(Australia)	Matthew Anderson	No team	Melbourne Mustangs	
(Sweden)	Sebastian Andersson	Hammarby IF	Adelaide Adrenaline	
(Canada)	Caleb Apperson	Birmingham Bulls	Adelaide Adrenaline	
(New Zealand)	Bradley Apps	Canterbury Red Devils	Melbourne Mustangs	
(Australia)	Spencer Austin	Penrith Raptors	Sydney Bears	
(Canada)	Sammy Banga	Brock University	Newcastle Northstars	
(Australia)	Anthony Barnes	Brisbane Blitz	Sydney Bears	
(Australia)	Ignacy Benjamin	Blueline Bombers	Sydney Ice Dogs	
(Australia)	Mitchell Bonollo	Saints Monarchs IHC	Melbourne Ice	
(Australia)	Evan Bowater	West Coast Flyers	Perth Thunder	
(Canada)	Channing Bresciani	University of Manitoba	CBR Brave	
(Australia)	Russell Brewer	Adelaide Tigers	Adelaide Adrenaline	
(Australia)	Declan Bronte	Ontario Hockey Academy U17	Melbourne Ice	
(New Zealand)	Aston Brookes	Southern Stampede	Sydney Bears	
(Canada)	Michael Burns	No team	Sydney Bears	
(Australia)	Nathan Cachia	No team	Melbourne Ice	
(Canada)	Mac Caruana	No team	Melbourne Ice	
(New Zealand)	Jeremy Chai	No team	Melbourne Ice	
(Australia)	Brad Chenoweth	Adelaide Tigers	Adelaide Adrenaline	
(Canada)	Nathan Chiarlitti	McGill University	Sydney Ice Dogs	
(United Kingdom)	Ben Davies	Guildford Flames	Melbourne Mustangs	
(Australia)	Hayden Dawes	Lindenwood University	CBR Brave	
(Australia)	Jakob Doornbos	Sydney Wolf Pack	CBR Brave	
(Australia)	Etienne du Toit	No team	Sydney Bears	
(Australia)	Andrew Erzen	Demons IHC	Melbourne Mustangs	
(Australia)	Kayne Fedor	Adelaide Tigers	Sydney Bears	
(Canada)	Brett Ferguson	Guildford Flames	Melbourne Mustangs	
(Canada)	Nate Fleming	Manchester Storm	Melbourne Ice	
(Australia)	Jeremy Friederich	Adelaide Generals	Adelaide Adrenaline	
(Switzerland)	Pascal Gemperli	EHC Chur	Perth Thunder	
(United States)	Trevor Gerling	LHC Les Lions	CBR Brave	
(Australia)	Kaden Goulds	Whitehawks IHC	Perth Thunder	
(Canada)	Pier-Olivier Grandmaison	Corsaires de Nantes	Perth Thunder	
(Australia)	Joey Gunner	Penrith Raptors	Sydney Bears	
(Australia)	Jacob Haley	Saints Monarchs IHC	Melbourne Ice	
(Australia)	Michael Haynes	Reach Rebels	Sydney Bears	
(Australia)	Josh Healey	Northern Chiefs	Perth Thunder	
(Canada)	Matt Hewitt	University of British Columbia	CBR Brave	
(Australia)	Sam Hodic	Melbourne Jets	Melbourne Ice	
(United Kingdom)	Jamie Holland	Adelaide Tigers	Adelaide Adrenaline	
(New Zealand)	Jermaine Joyce	Botany Swarm	Melbourne Mustangs	
(Australia)	Adam Kimbley	Penrith Raptors	Sydney Bears	
(Latvia)	Ņikita Kolesņikovs	KS Cracovia	Melbourne Mustangs	
(Belgium)	Bryan Kolodziejczyk	Albatros de Brest	Sydney Ice Dogs	
(Canada)	Devon Krogh	EV Landshut	Melbourne Ice	
(Canada)	Dillon Lawrence	Edinburgh Capitals	Melbourne Ice	
(Canada)	Sam Lawson	Innisfail Eagles	Newcastle Northstars	
(Australia)	Tyler Leeming	Adelaide Red Wings	Adelaide Adrenaline	
(Canada)	Chris Leveille	Brampton Beast	CBR Brave	
(Australia)	David Lewis	No team	CBR Brave	
(Australia)	Jayden Lewis	KaKiPo U20	CBR Brave	
(Canada)	Ryan Lough	St. Lawrence University	Sydney Bears	
(Australia)	Reggie Mattschoss	Adelaide Red Wings	Adelaide Adrenaline	
(Australia)	Michael McDowell	Braves IHC	Melbourne Mustangs	
(Australia)	Jason McMahon	Cockburn Whitehawks	Perth Thunder	
(Canada)	Jesse Moore	Saints Monarchs IHC	Melbourne Ice	
(Australia)	Thomas Munro	No team	Perth Thunder	
(Australia)	Joseph Nyamuka	Saints Monarchs IHC	Melbourne Ice	
(Canada)	Landon Oslanski	Braehead Clan	Perth Thunder	
(Australia)	Christian Pansino	Melbourne Glaciers	Melbourne Ice	
(Australia)	Rhys Pelliccione	Cockburn Whitehawks	Perth Thunder	
(Canada)	Adam Piett	No team	Adelaide Adrenaline	
(Finland)	Petri Pitkänen	No team	Melbourne Mustangs	
(Latvia)	Ainars Podzins	Edinburgh Capitals	CBR Brave	
(Australia)	Dylan Pope	Adelaide Falcons	Adelaide Adrenaline	
(Australia)	Matthew Price	Newcastle North Stars ECSL	Newcastle Northstars	
(Australia)	Harley Quinton-Jones	Newcastle North Stars ECSL	Newcastle Northstars	
(Australia)	Shai Rabinowitz	No team	Sydney Bears	
(Australia)	Fredrik Rozenberg	Boro/Vetlanda J20	Sydney Bears	
(Russia)	Maksim Shneider	Melbourne Sharks	Melbourne Ice	
(Australia)	Aiden Sillato	Reach Rebels	Sydney Ice Dogs	
(Canada)	Curtis Skip	University of Alberta-Augustana	Sydney Ice Dogs	
(Australia)	Cameron Smith	Penrith Raptors	Sydney Bears	
(United Kingdom)	Chad Smith	Fife Flyers	Sydney Bears	
(Australia)	Ethan Spelde	Sydney Sabres	Newcastle Northstars	
(Australia)	Andrew Stapleton	Adelaide Tigers	Adelaide Adrenaline	
(Australia)	Thomas Steven	Bellingham Blazers	Sydney Bears	
(Canada)	Graeme Strukoff	HC 07 Detva	Sydney Bears	
(Australia)	Tynan Theobald	London Lakers	CBR Brave	
(Australia)	Quenton Tombleson	Adelaide Falcons	Adelaide Adrenaline	
(Australia)	Lee Turner	Penrith Raptors	Sydney Ice Dogs	
(Australia)	James Urweiss	Sydney Sting	Sydney Bears	
(Canada)	Josh Velez	Blackhawks IHC	Melbourne Ice	
(Australia)	Nicholas Windle	No team	Perth Thunder	

==== Players lost ====
Nat	Player	Previous team	New team	Ref
(Australia)	Saxon Air	Sydney Bears	Nudo Bombers	
(Canada)	Casey Babineau	Adelaide Adrenaline	No team	
(Sweden)	Kristoffer Backman	Melbourne Ice	Tranås AIF	
(Australia)	Brian Bales	CBR Brave	No team	
(Australia)	Corey Banks	CBR Brave	No team	
(United States)	Matt Beattie	Melbourne Mustangs	No team	
(Australia)	Alan Becken	Sydney Bears	Nudo Bombers	
(Australia)	Andrew Belic	Melbourne Mustangs	Braves IHC	
(Canada)	Jessyko Bernard	Perth Thunder	Pensacola Ice Flyers	
(Canada)	Stephen Blunden	CBR Brave	Northern Federals	
(Australia)	Slavomir Boris	Sydney Bears	No team	
(Australia)	Tyson Boyd	Adelaide Adrenaline	Adelaide Blackhawks	
(United States)	Jackson Brewer	Sydney Bears	No team	
(Australia)	Tyrone Bronte	Melbourne Ice	Wilkes-Barre/Scranton Knights	
(Australia)	Jérémy Brown	Melbourne Ice	Boro/Vetlanda	
(Australia)	Jamie Campbell	Perth Thunder	No team	
(Australia)	Fraser Carson	Melbourne Mustangs	No team	
(Australia)	Andrew Chen	Adelaide Adrenaline	A21 Academy	
(Australia)	Ethan Cornford	Melbourne Ice	New Tecumseth Civics	
(Australia)	Robert Covino	Sydney Bears	No team	
(Canada)	Cameron Critchlow	Adelaide Adrenaline	Jacksonville Icemen	
(Sweden)	Niklas Dahlberg	Melbourne Ice	Tranås AIF	
(Australia)	Kevin Dow	Melbourne Ice	Demons IHC	
(Australia)	Lachlan Fahmy	Sydney Bears	Meijer AAA Hockey 18U	
(Australia)	David Foster	Melbourne Mustangs	Melbourne Glaciers	
(Australia)	Ben Gebert	Adelaide Adrenaline	Adelaide Tigers	
(Sweden)	Viktor Gibbs Sjödin	Melbourne Ice	HYS The Hague	
(Canada)	Kevin Harvey	Sydney Ice Dogs	No team	
(Australia)	Jack Hayes	Melbourne Mustangs	Melbourne Glaciers	
(Australia)	Damian Holland	Melbourne Mustangs	Braves IHC	
(Canada)	Dominic Jalbert	CBR Brave	Anglet Hormadi Élite	
(Canada)	Stephen Johnston	Sydney Ice Dogs	No team	
(Australia)	James Keane	Adelaide Adrenaline	Adelaide Tigers	
(Australia)	Rhett Kelly	Sydney Ice Dogs	No team	
(Canada)	Kale Kerbashian	Newcastle Northstars	Orlando Solar Bears	
(Canada)	Damien Ketlo	Sydney Ice Dogs	No team	
(Australia)	Peter King	Adelaide Adrenaline	Adelaide Falcons	
(Finland)	Anton Kokkonen	Melbourne Mustangs	No team	
(United States)	James Kruger	Melbourne Mustangs	No team	
(Australia)	Toby Kubara	CBR Brave	No team	
(Canada)	Steven Kuhn	Newcastle Northstars	Drakkars de Caen	
(Australia)	Tom Letki	CBR Brave	No team	
(Canada)	Bobby Lipsett	Melbourne Ice	No team	
(Australia)	Matti Luoma	CBR Brave	No team	
(Canada)	Cole MacMillan	Adelaide Adrenaline	No team	
(Canada)	Matt Marantz	Newcastle Northstars	No team	
(Australia)	Marcel McGuiness	Adelaide Adrenaline	Adelaide Red Wings	
(Australia)	Austin McKenzie	Melbourne Ice	No team	
(Australia)	Lachlan McKenzie	Sydney Bears	Sydney Wolf Pack	
(Canada)	Morgan McNeill	Adelaide Adrenaline	Bouctouche JCs	
(Canada)	Matt Murphy	Adelaide Adrenaline	No team	
(Canada)	Tyler Noseworthy	Sydney Bears	No team	
(Sweden)	Sebastian Ottosson	Melbourne Ice	Tranås AIF	
(Canada)	Christian Ouellet	Perth Thunder	Anglet Hormadi Élite	
(Australia)	Luke Philps	CBR Brave	No team	
(Australia)	Dathan Pleiter	Perth Thunder	Perth Sharks	
(Canada)	Félix-Antoine Poulin	Newcastle Northstars	MsHK Žilina	
(Canada)	Rory Rawlyk	Sydney Ice Dogs	ECDC Memmingen	
(Australia)	Luke Read	Sydney Bears	No team	
(Australia)	Joel Rhodes	Sydney Bears	No team	
(Czech Republic)	Jan Safar	CBR Brave	Remparts de Tours	
(Australia)	Jarrod Smith	Sydney Ice Dogs	Reach Rebels	
(Australia)	Kane Spence	Sydney Ice Dogs	No team	
(Australia)	Matt Taylor	Newcastle Northstars	Newcastle North Stars ECSL	
(Australia)	Dale Tilsted	Sydney Ice Dogs	Sydney Sabres	
(Australia)	Shaun Tobin	Perth Thunder	No team	
(Australia)	Byron Tschuma	Melbourne Mustangs	No team	
(Australia)	David Upton	Sydney Ice Dogs	No team	
(Canada)	Brent Vandenberg	Sydney Bears	No team	
(Australia)	Tom Voller	Melbourne Mustangs	Demons IHC	
(Australia)	Cameron Walsh	Perth Thunder	No team	
(Australia)	Nicholas Weiland	Sydney Ice Dogs	Sydney Sabres	
(Australia)	Andrew White	Sydney Ice Dogs	No team	
(Australia)	Sebastian Woodlands	Adelaide Adrenaline	A21 Academy	

== Regular season ==
The regular season began on 21 April 2018 and will run through to 26 August 2018 before the top four teams advance to compete in the Goodall Cup playoff series.

=== April ===
Date	Time	Away	Score	Home	Location	Recap
21 April	17:00	Adelaide Adrenaline	0–8	Melbourne Ice	O'Brien Group Arena	
21 April	17:00	Newcastle Northstars	3–4 (SO)	Sydney Ice Dogs	Macquarie Ice Rink	
21 April	17:30	Sydney Bears	2–4	CBR Brave	Phillip Ice Skating Centre	
22 April	16:00	Adelaide Adrenaline	3–1	Melbourne Mustangs	O'Brien Group Arena	
28 April	16:30	Sydney Ice Dogs	2–4	Adelaide Adrenaline	Adelaide Ice Arena	
28 April	17:00	CBR Brave	4–2	Newcastle Northstars	Hunter Ice Skating Stadium	
28 April	17:00	Perth Thunder	4–5 (SO)	Melbourne Ice	O'Brien Group Arena	
29 April	16:00	Perth Thunder	3–6	Melbourne Mustangs	O'Brien Group Arena	
29 April	16:30	Sydney Ice Dogs	6–3	Adelaide Adrenaline	Adelaide Ice Arena	

=== May ===
Date	Time	Away	Score	Home	Location	Recap
5 May	16:30	Melbourne Mustangs	6–2	Perth Thunder	Perth Ice Arena	
5 May	16:30	Melbourne Ice	4–2	Adelaide Adrenaline	Adelaide Ice Arena	
5 May	17:00	Sydney Bears	1–5	Sydney Ice Dogs	Macquarie Ice Rink	
5 May	17:30	Newcastle Northstars	3–8	CBR Brave	Phillip Ice Skating Centre	
6 May	16:00	Sydney Ice Dogs	3–4 (SO)	Newcastle Northstars	Hunter Ice Skating Stadium	
6 May	16:30	Melbourne Ice	4–3 (SO)	Adelaide Adrenaline	Adelaide Ice Arena	
6 May	16:30	Melbourne Mustangs	2–4	Perth Thunder	Perth Ice Arena	
6 May	17:00	CBR Brave	3–5	Sydney Bears	Macquarie Ice Rink	
11 May	19:30	Melbourne Ice	3–5	Melbourne Mustangs	O'Brien Group Arena	
12 May	16:30	Sydney Ice Dogs	3–1	Perth Thunder	Perth Ice Arena	
12 May	17:00	Newcastle Northstars	5–4	Melbourne Ice	O'Brien Group Arena	
12 May	17:00	CBR Brave	3–1	Sydney Bears	Macquarie Ice Rink	
13 May	16:00	Newcastle Northstars	4–3	Melbourne Mustangs	O'Brien Group Arena	
13 May	16:30	Sydney Ice Dogs	4–8	Perth Thunder	Perth Ice Arena	
19 May	16:30	Newcastle Northstars	5–6 (SO)	Adelaide Adrenaline	Adelaide Ice Arena	
19 May	17:00	Sydney Bears	3–2 (SO)	Melbourne Mustangs	O'Brien Group Arena	
19 May	17:30	Perth Thunder	2–6	CBR Brave	Phillip Ice Skating Centre	
20 May	16:00	Sydney Bears	3–2	Melbourne Ice	O'Brien Group Arena	
20 May	16:30	Newcastle Northstars	4–2	Adelaide Adrenaline	Adelaide Ice Arena	
20 May	17:00	Perth Thunder	4–3	CBR Brave	Phillip Ice Skating Centre	
26 May	16:00	Melbourne Mustangs	5–6 (SO)	Newcastle Northstars	Hunter Ice Skating Stadium	
26 May	16:30	Adelaide Adrenaline	2–6	Perth Thunder	Perth Ice Arena	
26 May	17:00	Sydney Ice Dogs	3–2 (SO)	Sydney Bears	Macquarie Ice Rink	
26 May	17:00	Melbourne Ice	0–5	CBR Brave	Phillip Ice Skating Centre	
27 May	16:30	Adelaide Adrenaline	3–5	Perth Thunder	Perth Ice Arena	
27 May	17:00	Melbourne Ice	1–4	CBR Brave	Phillip Ice Skating Centre	
27 May	17:00	Melbourne Mustangs	3–6	Sydney Bears	Macquarie Ice Rink	

=== June ===
Date	Time	Away	Score	Home	Location	Recap
9 June	17:00	Melbourne Mustangs	2–5	Newcastle Northstars	Hunter Ice Skating Stadium	
9 June	17:00	Perth Thunder	4–3 (SO)	Sydney Bears	Macquarie Ice Rink	
10 June	16:00	Perth Thunder	8–2	Newcastle Northstars	Hunter Ice Skating Stadium	
10 June	17:00	Melbourne Mustangs	2–6	Sydney Ice Dogs	Macquarie Ice Rink	
15 June	19:30	Melbourne Mustangs	5–4 (SO)	Melbourne Ice	O'Brien Group Arena	
16 June	16:30	CBR Brave	11–4	Adelaide Adrenaline	Adelaide Ice Arena	
16 June	17:00	Sydney Ice Dogs	4–3	Melbourne Mustangs	O'Brien Group Arena	
16 June	17:00	Newcastle Northstars	0–2	Sydney Bears	Macquarie Ice Rink	
17 June	16:00	Sydney Ice Dogs	4–3 (SO)	Melbourne Ice	O'Brien Group Arena	
17 June	16:30	CBR Brave	5–2	Perth Thunder	Perth Ice Arena	
23 June	16:30	Sydney Bears	6–2	Adelaide Adrenaline	Adelaide Ice Arena	
23 June	17:00	Perth Thunder	4–3 (SO)	Newcastle Northstars	Hunter Ice Skating Stadium	
23 June	17:00	Melbourne Ice	2–6	Sydney Ice Dogs	Macquarie Ice Rink	
23 June	17:30	Melbourne Mustangs	4–1	CBR Brave	Phillip Ice Skating Centre	
24 June	16:00	Melbourne Ice	2–3	Newcastle Northstars	Hunter Ice Skating Stadium	
24 June	16:30	Sydney Bears	2–3 (SO)	Adelaide Adrenaline	Adelaide Ice Arena	
24 June	17:00	Melbourne Mustangs	4–8	CBR Brave	Phillip Ice Skating Centre	
24 June	17:00	Perth Thunder	3–2	Sydney Ice Dogs	Macquarie Ice Rink	
29 June	19:30	Melbourne Ice	4–1	Melbourne Mustangs	O'Brien Group Arena	
29 June	19:00	Newcastle Northstars	3–2 (SO)	Sydney Ice Dogs	Macquarie Ice Rink	
30 June	16:30	CBR Brave	6–2	Perth Thunder	Perth Ice Arena	
30 June	17:00	Sydney Bears	1–2	Melbourne Ice	O'Brien Group Arena	

=== July ===
Date	Time	Away	Score	Home	Location	Recap
1 July	16:00	Sydney Ice Dogs	4–6	Newcastle Northstars	Hunter Ice Skating Stadium	
1 July	16:00	Sydney Bears	0–3	Melbourne Mustangs	O'Brien Group Arena	
1 July	16:30	CBR Brave	6–2	Adelaide Adrenaline	Adelaide Ice Arena	
7 July	17:00	Adelaide Adrenaline	4–5	Newcastle Northstars	Hunter Ice Skating Stadium	
7 July	17:00	CBR Brave	7–5	Melbourne Mustangs	O'Brien Group Arena	
7 July	17:00	Melbourne Ice	1–7	Sydney Bears	Macquarie Ice Rink	
8 July	16:00	Melbourne Ice	4–3	Newcastle Northstars	Hunter Ice Skating Stadium	
8 July	16:00	CBR Brave	3–6	Melbourne Mustangs	O'Brien Group Arena	
8 July	17:00	Adelaide Adrenaline	0–4	Sydney Ice Dogs	Macquarie Ice Rink	
13 July	19:30	Sydney Ice Dogs	0–5	Sydney Bears	Macquarie Ice Rink	
14 July	16:30	Melbourne Ice	3–4 (SO)	Perth Thunder	Perth Ice Arena	
14 July	17:00	Adelaide Adrenaline	0–5	Sydney Ice Dogs	Macquarie Ice Rink	
14 July	17:30	Newcastle Northstars	1–3	CBR Brave	Phillip Ice Skating Centre	
15 July	16:30	Melbourne Ice	4–7	Perth Thunder	Perth Ice Arena	
15 July	17:00	Adelaide Adrenaline	1–2 (SO)	Sydney Bears	Macquarie Ice Rink	
21 July	16:30	Perth Thunder	9–2	Adelaide Adrenaline	Adelaide Ice Arena	
21 July	17:00	Sydney Ice Dogs	4–3	Melbourne Ice	O'Brien Group Arena	
21 July	17:30	Sydney Bears	2–7	CBR Brave	Phillip Ice Skating Centre	
22 July	16:00	Sydney Bears	5–2	Newcastle Northstars	Hunter Ice Skating Stadium	
22 July	16:00	Sydney Ice Dogs	0–2	Melbourne Mustangs	O'Brien Group Arena	
22 July	16:30	Perth Thunder	1–2	Adelaide Adrenaline	Adelaide Ice Arena	
28 July	17:00	Newcastle Northstars	6–4	Melbourne Mustangs	O'Brien Group Arena	
28 July	17:00	Perth Thunder	3–0	Sydney Ice Dogs	Macquarie Ice Rink	
28 July	17:30	Adelaide Adrenaline	2–5	CBR Brave	Phillip Ice Skating Centre	
29 July	14:00	Adelaide Adrenaline	0–6	CBR Brave	Phillip Ice Skating Centre	
29 July	16:00	Newcastle Northstars	4–3 (SO)	Melbourne Ice	O'Brien Group Arena	
29 July	17:00	Perth Thunder	1–4	Sydney Bears	Macquarie Ice Rink	

=== August ===
Date	Time	Away	Score	Home	Location	Recap
4 August	16:30	Sydney Bears	3–2 (SO)	Perth Thunder	Perth Ice Arena	
4 August	17:00	Adelaide Adrenaline	4–5 (SO)	Melbourne Mustangs	O'Brien Group Arena	
4 August	17:00	CBR Brave	6–3	Sydney Ice Dogs	Macquarie Ice Rink	
5 August	16:00	CBR Brave	6–4	Newcastle Northstars	Hunter Ice Skating Stadium	
5 August	16:00	Adelaide Adrenaline	2–9	Melbourne Ice	O'Brien Group Arena	
5 August	16:30	Sydney Bears	6–4	Perth Thunder	Perth Ice Arena	
11 August	16:30	Melbourne Mustangs	7–1	Adelaide Adrenaline	Adelaide Ice Arena	
11 August	17:00	Melbourne Ice	1–4	Sydney Bears	Macquarie Ice Rink	
11 August	17:30	Sydney Ice Dogs	8–11	CBR Brave	Phillip Ice Skating Centre	
12 August	16:00	Sydney Bears	4–3	Newcastle Northstars	Hunter Ice Skating Stadium	
12 August	16:30	Melbourne Mustangs	4–1	Adelaide Adrenaline	Adelaide Ice Arena	
12 August	17:00	Melbourne Ice	6–2	Sydney Ice Dogs	Macquarie Ice Rink	
17 August	19:30	Newcastle Northstars	3–9	Sydney Bears	Macquarie Ice Rink	
17 August	19:30	Melbourne Mustangs	7–0	Melbourne Ice	O'Brien Group Arena	
18 August	17:00	Adelaide Adrenaline	4–10	Newcastle Northstars	Hunter Ice Skating Stadium	
18 August	17:00	Perth Thunder	2–5	Melbourne Mustangs	O'Brien Group Arena	
18 August	17:00	CBR Brave	3–1	Sydney Ice Dogs	Macquarie Ice Rink	
19 August	16:00	Perth Thunder	6–3	Melbourne Ice	O'Brien Group Arena	
19 August	17:00	Adelaide Adrenaline	0–9	Sydney Bears	Macquarie Ice Rink	
19 August	17:00	Sydney Ice Dogs	2–5	CBR Brave	Phillip Ice Skating Centre	
24 August	19:30	Sydney Bears	2–7	Sydney Ice Dogs	Macquarie Ice Rink	
25 August	16:30	Newcastle Northstars	4–5 (SO)	Perth Thunder	Perth Ice Arena	
25 August	17:00	Melbourne Mustangs	1–5	Sydney Bears	Macquarie Ice Rink	
25 August	17:00	CBR Brave	7–0	Melbourne Ice	O'Brien Group Arena	
26 August	16:30	Newcastle Northstars	3–5	Perth Thunder	Perth Ice Arena	
26 August	16:30	CBR Brave	6–2	Melbourne Ice	O'Brien Group Arena	
26 August	17:00	Melbourne Mustangs	3–2	Sydney Ice Dogs	Macquarie Ice Rink	

=== Standings ===
Team	GP	W	SOW	SOL	L	GF	GA	GDF	PTS
CBR Brave	28	24	0	0	4	152	74	+78	72
Sydney Bears	28	15	3	3	7	104	72	+32	54
Perth Thunder	28	12	4	2	10	111	100	+11	46
Melbourne Mustangs	28	12	2	2	12	106	97	+9	42
Newcastle Northstars	28	9	4	4	11	106	119	–13	39
Sydney Ice Dogs	28	10	3	2	13	96	97	–1	38
Melbourne Ice	28	7	2	4	15	87	114	–27	29
Adelaide Adrenaline	28	3	2	3	20	62	151	–89	16

Qualified for the Goodall Cup playoffs	H Newman Reid Trophy winners

=== Statistics ===
==== Scoring leaders ====
List shows the ten top skaters sorted by points, then goals. Current as of 23 September 2018

Player	Team	GP	G	A	Pts	PIM	POS
Pier-Olivier Grandmaison	Perth Thunder	28	28	39	67	26	F
Travor Gerling	CBR Brave	24	24	43	67	12	F
Wehebe Darge	CBR Brave	26	22	34	56	34	F
Geordie Wudrick	Sydney Ice Dogs	28	22	34	56	24	F
Charles Adams	Sydney Bears	24	21	33	54	16	F
Ryan Lough	Sydney Bears	21	25	26	51	12	F
Benjamin Breault	Perth Thunder	28	19	31	50	16	F
Grant Toulmin	Sydney Ice Dogs	21	15	33	48	4	F
Chris Leveille	CBR Brave	15	20	27	47	47	F
Landon Oslanski	Perth Thunder	19	12	34	46	90	D

==== Leading goaltenders ====
Only the top five goaltenders, based on save percentage with a minimum 40% of the team's ice time. Current as of 23 September 2018

Player	Team	MIP	SOG	GA	GAA	SVS%	SO
Matt Hewitt	CBR Brave	1182	614	46	1.95	0.925	2
Anthony Kimlin	Sydney Bears	1255	749	60	2.39	0.920	2
Curtis Skip	Sydney Ice Dogs	1095	717	60	2.74	0.916	2
Aleksi Toivonen	Melbourne Mustangs	667	318	37	2.77	0.884	2
Peter Di Salvo	Perth Thunder	1398	1052	96	3.43	0.909	1

=== Season awards ===
Below lists the 2018 AIHL regular season award winners.

Award	Name	Team
MVP	(Canada) Pier-Olivier Grandmaison	Perth Thunder
Goaltender	(Australia) Anthony Kimlin	Sydney Bears
Defenceman	(Canada) Landon Oslanski	Perth Thunder
Rookie	(Australia) Jason McMahon	Perth Thunder
Local player	(Australia) Wehebe Darge	CBR Brave
Coach	(Australia) Ron Kuprowsky	Sydney Bears

Source pt1 Source pt2

== Goodall Cup playoffs ==
The 2018 playoffs was scheduled for 1 September with the Goodall Cup final held on 2 September. Following the end of the regular season the top four teams advanced to the playoff series which was held at O'Brien Group Arena in the Docklands precinct of Melbourne, Victoria. The series was a single game elimination with the two winning semi-finalists advancing to the Goodall Cup final. The Goodall Cup was won by the CBR Brave (first title) who defeated the Sydney Bears 4–3 in overtime after the two sides finished regulation time locked at 3-3. The Brave's Canadian import forward, Trevor Gerling, was named the finals most valuable player (MVP) after he scored the winning goal in overtime.

Semi-finals
1	CBR Brave	5
4	Melbourne Mustangs	1
3	Perth Thunder	0
2	Sydney Bears	3

Final
CBR Brave	4
Sydney Bears	3

All times are UTC+10:00

=== Semi-finals ===
1 September 2018; 15:00	Melbourne Mustangs	1–5 (0–2, 1–3, 0–0)	CBR Brave	O'Brien Group Arena; Attendance: 1500

Game reference

Aleksi Toivonen
Goalies
Matt Hewitt
Referees:
Jeff Scott
Kent Unwin
Linesmen:
Casper Russelhuber
Grainge Phillips

	0 – 1	3:16 – Gerling (PP) (Bresciani, Leveille)
	0 – 2	8:08 – C.Kubara (unassisted)
	0 – 3	19.48 – Gerling (SH) (Leveille)
20:44 – Ferguson (Davies, McMahon)	1 – 3
	1 – 4	28.09 – C.Kubara (Dawes)
	1 – 5	29:00 – Harvey (Gerling, Darge)

8 min
Penalties
28 min
24
Shots
17

1 September 2018; 18:00	Perth Thunder	0–3 (0–1, 0–1, 0–1)	Sydney Bears	O'Brien Group Arena; Attendance: 1500

Game reference

Peter Di Salvo
Goalies
Anthony Kimlin
Referees:
Jeff Klinck
Chris Parks
Linesmen:
Fraser Ohlson
Russel Dow

0 – 1	14:05 – Adams (PP) (Strukoff)
0 – 2	17:06 – Lough (Annesley, du Toit)
0 – 3	49:48 – Lough (Adams)

4 min
Penalties
8 min
25
Shots
33

=== Final ===
2 September 2018; 15:00	Sydney Bears	3–4 (OT) (0–2, 3–0, 0–1, 0–1)	CBR Brave	O'Brien Group Arena; Attendance: 1500

Game reference

Anthony Kimlin
Goalies
Matt Hewitt
Referees:
Jeff Scott
Kent Unwin
Linesmen:
Casper Russelhuber
Fraser Ohlson

	0 – 1	5:08 – T.Kubara (Henning, Miettinen)
	0 – 2	9:57 – Hughes (PP) (Darge)
20:01 – Schlamp (PP) (Strukoff, Lough)	1 – 2
23:50 – Clare (du Toit, Lough)	2 – 2
28:48 – Lough (Adams, Funes)	3 – 2
	3 – 3	35:09 – Leveille (Darge, Bresciani)
	3 – 4	61:39 – Gerling (Darge)

2 min
Penalties
4 min
37
Shots
37

== All-Star weekend ==
The 2018 AIHL All-Star Weekend was held at the Adelaide Ice Arena, Adelaide on 2 and 3 June 2018. The format of the weekend was unchanged from 2017 with a skills competition on 2 June and an all-stars game on 3 June. Adelaide Adrenaline's Josef Rezek and David Huxley were initially announced as the captains of the two teams replacing Jamie Bourke and Lliam Webster from 2016. Huxley was later replaced by the Adrenaline's Zachary Boyle due to Huxley's retirement prior to the 2018 season. The Adrenaline's head coach Jim Fuyarchuk and assistant coach Sami Mantere were named as the coaches of Team Boyle and Team Rezek respectively. APA Group re-signed as sponsor of the weekend after sponsoring the previous three events.

The skills competition saw the Adelaide Adrenaline and Sydney Bears take out two of the seven events each, while the Newcastle Northstars, Perth Thunder and Sydney Ice Dogs all picked up one each. On 3 June Team Rezek defeated Team Boyle 13–8 in the All-Star Game to claim the Mick McCormack Cup.

=== Skills competition ===
- Breakaway Challenge: Josef Rezek (Adelaide Adrenaline)
- Elimination Shootout: Sebastian Andersson (Adelaide Adrenaline)
- Fastest Skater: Jamie Woodman (Perth Thunder) – 12.53 seconds
- Goaltender Race: Anthony Kimlin (Sydney Bears)
- Hardest Shot: Nathan Chiarlitti (Sydney Ice Dogs) – 154 km/h
- Shooting Accuracy: Nick Rivait (Newcastle Northstars) – 12.65 seconds
- Stickhandling: Charlie Adams (Sydney Bears) – 18.15 seconds

=== All-star game ===
3 June 2018	Team Boyle	8–13	Team Rezek	Adelaide IceArenA

Game reference
