= Henri Auvinen =

Finnish ice hockey player

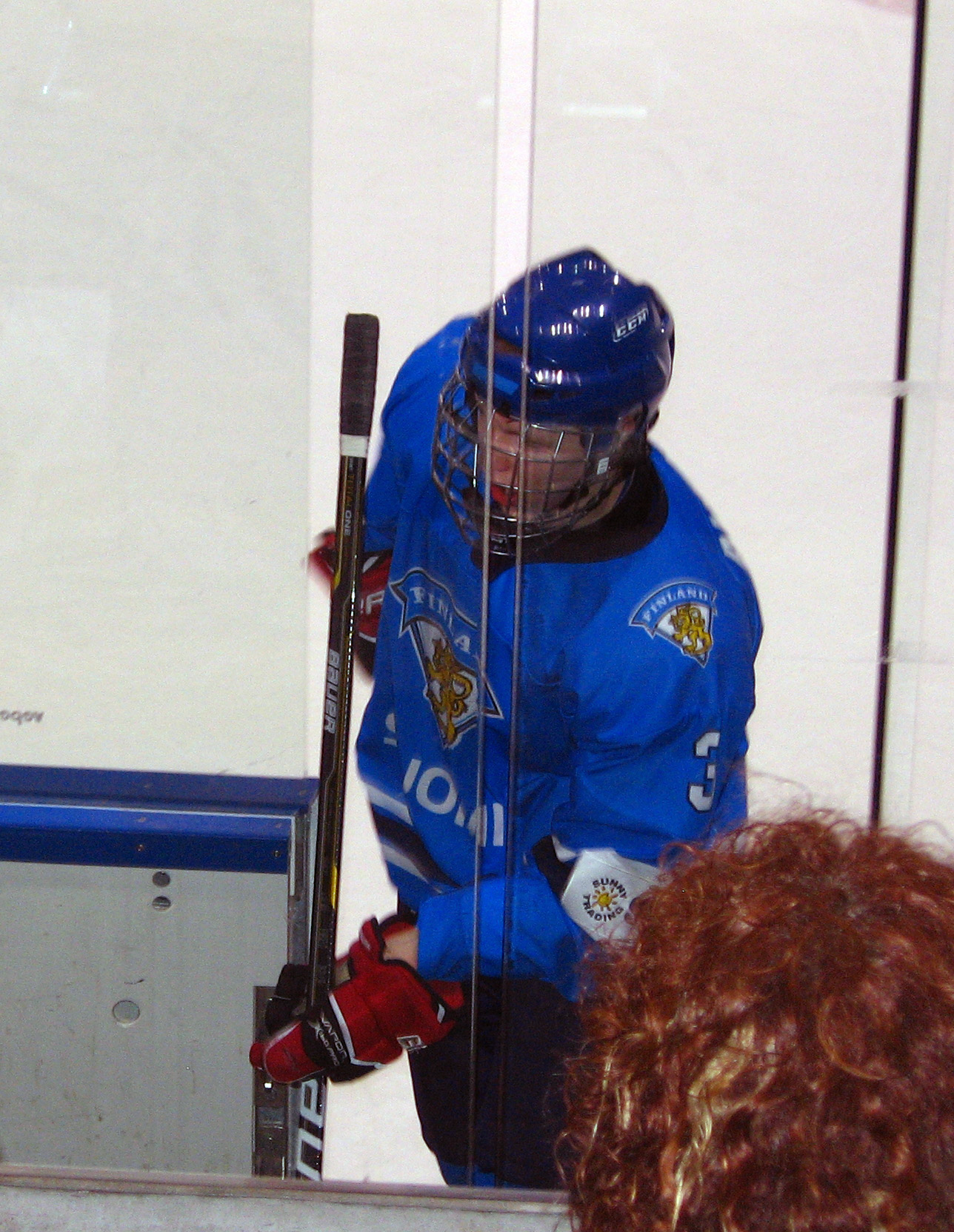
- Henri Auvinen pictured playing for Finland Under 18's ice hockey team
- Born: February 21, 1993 (age 33) Jyväskylä, Finland
- Height: 6 ft 2 in (188 cm)
- Weight: 198 lb (90 kg; 14 st 2 lb)
- Position: Defence
- Shoots: Left
- AIHL team Former teams: Perth Thunder; JYP; HPK; Jukurit; Frederikshavn White Hawks
- Playing career: 2011–present

Henri Auvinen (born February 21, 1993) is a Finnish professional ice hockey defenceman. He is currently playing for the Perth Thunder of the Australian Ice Hockey League. Prior to this, he played for Bodens HF in Hockeyettan.

Auvinen made his SM-liiga debut playing with JYP Jyväskylä during the 2011–12 SM-liiga season. He also played for HPK and Jukurit. He is now playing for the Boxers de Bordeaux since the 31/012023.
