= Perth Thunder =

- City: Perth, Western Australia
- League: Australian Ice Hockey League
- Conference: Hellyer
- Founded: 2010 (16 years ago)
- Operated: 2010–present
- Home arena: Perth Ice Arena
- Colours: Blue, white, red
- Owner: Stan Scott
- General manager: (New Zealand) Andrew Cox
- Head coach: (Australia) John Kennedy
- Captain: (Australia) Kieren Webster
- Website: www.perththunder.com.au

Franchise history
- 2010–present: Perth Thunder

Championships
- H Newman Reid Trophies: 0
- Goodall Cups: 0

The Perth Thunder is an Australian semi-professional ice hockey team from Perth, Western Australia. Founded in 2010, the Thunder have been a member of the Australian Ice Hockey League (AIHL) since 2012. The Thunder are based at the Perth Ice Arena, located in the suburb of Malaga. Perth are one time Goodall Cup runners-up and two time H Newman Reid Trophy runners-up.

== History ==
=== Foundation blocks ===
The concept of a Perth based Australian Ice Hockey League (AIHL) team began in 2007. Englishman Stan Scott, a former four time national champion in the 1980s, began a conversation about the idea due to local state hockey becoming predictable and boring. The need for a new challenge and a pathway for local Western Australian talent was the driving force that propelled the idea into action and eventually a team.

The plan was to take the crop of young talent in Western Australian junior ranks and develop it into the backbone of an AIHL team, add foreign talents to the mix and organising a strong team that is both capable of challenging short term, developing medium term and dominating long term.

Stan's first proposal in 2007 was to invite an AIHL team over to Perth to play in a ‘challenge series’ to test the competitiveness of local talent. The idea was knocked back and Stan Scott was told ‘it could not be done’. In 2009, the campaign to enter the AIHL began to pick up pace. A sustainable business plan was developed, sponsorship and community support was sought and acquired, and plans were drawn up for inviting interstate teams to play matches in WA and for a team to travel interstate to Eastern Australia. Once these key objectives were met, the state would then be in a position to establish a team and apply for an AIHL licence.

=== Establishment ===
Having met their establishment goals, the Perth Thunder was finally established in 2010 by Stan Scott and John Del Basso. Stan Scott was immediately appointed Thunder general manager (GM). In 2010, through a working contact, Paul Watson (Melbourne Ice head coach), Stan Scott was able to secure the first AIHL opposition for exhibition matches against the Thunder. The Thunder, known at that time under the working title of "Western Thunder", travelled to Melbourne to take on the Melbourne Ice and fellow AIHL aspirant, Mustangs Ice Hockey Club. The Ice also travelled to Perth. After all the exhibition matches had been played and proved successful, it was clear the team was ready to apply for entry into the AIHL. In November 2010, the Thunder was granted a provisional licence for 2011, with a view for the team to enter the league for the 2012 season as the ninth team.

In 2011, the Thunder worked with the AIHL to find solutions to predicted problems arising from a team in Western Australian joining a league predominantly located in Eastern Australia. Issues such as higher operating costs, extra demands on players and staff, travelling and match scheduling. The Thunder provided their business case to cover these issues and to showcase to the AIHL the benefits Perth and Western Australia could bring to the AIHL. Stan Scott completed his level 3 coaching qualifications to ensure the team would have an appropriately qualified coach at the outset and the team organised more exhibition matches. The Thunder travelled to Adelaide in May to play the Adelaide Adrenaline twice. Grabbing a tie and win from those matches. In June, the Melbourne Ice travelled to Perth for a two game series at Cockburn Ice Arena. The Ice and Thunder split the series one-all. In September, the Thunder welcomed the Newcastle North Stars to Perth for a two game series. The Thunder won both matches 4–2 to complete a successful season of exhibition games. On 22 October 2011, at the AIHL annual general meeting (AGM), the Thunder was officially granted their full licence and joined the AIHL. The team immediately set about preparing for the 2012 AIHL season.

=== AIHL era ===
In the Thunder's inaugural season in 2012, the team set lofty objectives for itself. The goal was to make finals in their first season. The introduction of the Thunder to the league saw the AIHL adopt a conference format for the first time. The Thunder was placed in the Easton Conference along with Melbourne Ice, Melbourne Mustangs, Adelaide Adrenaline and Gold Coast Blue Tongues. The top two teams from each of the two conferences qualified for finals. The Thunder enjoyed an up and down first season. Their form was inconsistent. It took some time for the Thunder to settle on consistent first and second lines. However, Perth was one of the few teams in the league in 2012 that implemented a full third line, helping the team towards the end of the season. By season's conclusion, the Thunder had won ten from twenty-four matches. They placed fourth in their conference, missing out on finals. 30 August 2012, Perth held their first ever awards night at the Rosemount Hotel. Canadian import Ken Rolph was named the team's inaugural MVP. Rolph racked up 21 goals and 26 assists during the season to win the award. Best defenceman went to Aaron Wilson, Samuel Wilson was named best local player, while David Kudla took out the most improved award.

In 2013, the Thunder, in only their second year in the competition, reached their first ever AIHL finals weekend after finishing third in the league standings for the season. Their first finals opposition was the Newcastle North Stars in a semi-final held at the Melbourne Icehouse on 7 September 2013. Jordan Kyros was the first Thunder player to score a goal in finals hockey but it proved a consolation goal as the Thunder lost the semi-final match 1–6 with Northstars Canadian import, Pier-Olivier Cotnoir, starting with a hat trick of goals.

In 2014, prior to the start of the season, the Thunder welcomed a new investor in the team. Robert Cox became partner, director and board member in March 2014. Cox had followed the team since its inception. In April, Stan Scott announced that he had stepped down as head coach to focus on the general manager operations of the club. Scott was replaced by Dylan Forsythe as head coach and but Scott remained on the coaching panel as an assistant. After eight games into the 2014 season it was announced that Forsythe had stepped down as head coach with immediate effect for unknown reasons. Stan Scott agreed to take over as interim head coach for the remainder of the season. The Thunder did not enjoy a good season on the ice in 2014. The team finished seventh in the league standings (second last), the lowest finish in Thunder history.

Between 2015 and 2018, the Thunder enjoyed a period of consistency in the league. The team finished third or second each season but failed to win in four consecutive AIHL semi-finals. In 2019, the Thunder broke their finals curse by beating home team, the Newcastle Northstars 3–2 to reach their first ever Goodall Cup final. In the final the Thunder came up against the Sydney Bears. Perth took a quick 2–0 lead in the first period over the Bears thanks to goals to Louick Marcotte and Kieren Webster. However, the Bears fought back to score five unanswered goals to defeat the Thunder 5–2.

Ahead of the 2020 season, the Thunder appointed former player Ben Breault as head coach after Dave Ruck resigned due to a heavy workload between coaching and his job. However, the 2020 season was first postponed and then cancelled due to the outbreak of COVID-19. The 2021 season was subsequently also cancelled, resulting in two years without a game for the Thunder.

When the 2022 season was announced by the AIHL, it included all eight current AIHL teams participating. The AIHL in February 2022 released the regular season schedule and it contained fixtures for all eight teams, home and away. In response to the schedule being posted, the Perth Thunder released a public statement on 12 February 2022, confirming the current Western Australian (WA) border restrictions presented challenges for the team to participate in the 2022 season, but that the team would continue to dialog with stakeholders and hope for a swift resolution by the state government. On 18 February 2022, the Thunder in conjunction with the AIHL announced the team would withdraw from the 2022 AIHL season due to continued uncertainty surrounding the WA border opening and the limited time left to organise team and travel arrangements prior to the 2022 season kicking off in April. The Thunder did offer its players, staff, fans and sponsors the possibility of exhibition matches being played in Perth in 2022 to compensate for the unfortunate withdrawal.

== Season-by-season results ==
Perth Thunder all-time record
Season	Regular season											Finals									Top points scorer
Season	P	W	T	L	OW	OL	GF	GA	GD	Pts	Finish	P	W	L	GF	GA	Result	Preliminary Final	Semi Final	Goodall Cup Final	Name	Points
2012	24	10	–	12	–	2	81	80	+1	32	7th	–									(United States) Phil Ginand	50
2013	28	17	–	9	1	1	127	114	+13	54	3rd	1	–	1	1	6	Semi-finalist	–	Lost 1–6 (North Stars)	–	(United States) Michael Forney	47
2014	28	9	–	15	2	2	94	94	+0	33	7th	–									(Canada) Stuart Stefan	44
2015	28	14	–	9	1	4	125	104	+21	48	3rd	1	–	1	–	1	Semi-finalist	–	Lost 0–1 (Ice)	–	(Finland) Toni Kluuskeri	37
2016	28	16	–	7	4	1	96	73	+23	57	2nd	1	–	1	2	3	Semi-finalist	–	Lost 2–3 (OT) (North Stars)	–	(Canada) Benjamin Breault	52
2017	28	16	–	6	3	3	110	75	+35	57	2nd	1	–	1	2	6	Semi-finalist	–	Lost 2–6 (Brave)	–	(Canada) Benjamin Breault	58
2018	28	12	–	10	4	2	111	100	+11	46	3rd	1	–	1	0	3	Semi-finalist	–	Lost 0–3 (Bears)	–	(Canada) Pier-Olivier Grandmaison	67
2019	28	16	–	10	1	1	116	103	+13	51	3rd	2	1	1	5	7	Runner-up	–	Won 3–2 (Northstars)	Lost 2–5 (Bears)	(Canada) Louick Marcotte	62
2020	2020 and 2021 AIHL seasons were cancelled and not contested
2021	2020 and 2021 AIHL seasons were cancelled and not contested
2022	Played in 4 exhibition games after withdrawing from the 2022 regular season due to Western Australia border restrictions^{1}
2023	26	17	–	8	–	1	141	90	+51	52	5th	2	1	1	5	5	Semi-finalist	Won 4-1 (Northstars)	Lost 1-4 (Brave)	–	(United States) Conner Jean	48
2024	30	15	–	9	5	1	124	98	+26	53	3rd	1	0	1	1	2	Prelim-finalist	Lost 1-2 (Brave)	–	–	(Canada) Jeremiah Addison	38
2025	28	15	–	10	1	2	162	110	+52	46	3rd	2	1	1	6	8	Semi-finalist	Won 5-2 (Mustangs)	Lost 1-6 (Brave)	–	(Japan) Yu Hikosaka	68
2026	–	–	–	–	–	–	–	–	–	–	–	–	–	–	–	–	–	–	–	–	–	–
Totals	304	157	–	105	22	20	1287	1041	+246			12	3	9	22	41

^{1} 2022 exhibition record: 4 games, 3 wins, 1 loss, 17 goals scored, 11 goals conceded. 2 additional games against Melbourne Mustangs in Perth were cancelled in mid July 2022.

Champions	Runners-up	Third place

== Championships ==
- Goodall Cup

(gold) Champions (0):
(silver) Runners-up (1): 2019

- H Newman Reid Trophy (replaced the V.I.P. Cup)

(gold) Premiers (0):
(silver) Runner-up (2): 2016, 2017

== Players ==
=== Current roster ===
Team roster for the 2026 AIHL season.

Perth Thunder roster - 2026 AIHL season
Active roster		Inactive roster	Coaching staff
Goaltenders: 31 (Australia) Charles Smart; 35 (Australia) Aleksi Toivonen; - (Canada) Corey Boutin; Defencemen: 3 (Australia) Robert Haselhurst; 6 (Australia) Patrick Sucher; 8 (Australia) David Kudla; 15 (Australia) Lynden Lodge; 18 (Finland) Jani Kluuskeri (I); 22 (Finland) Henri Auvinen (I); 25 (Australia) Alastair Punler; 27 (Australia) Jamie Woodman; 28 (Australia) Drew Robson	Forwards: 2 (Australia) Tyler Colev; 11 (Japan) Yu Hikosaka (I); 12 (Australia) Kieren Webster (C); 13 (Australia) Maxim Lyashenko; 16 (Australia) Yannic Lodge; 17 (Australia) Brayden Maybee; 19 (Finland) Ville Tenosalmi (A); 23 (Australia) Jordan Kyros (A); 32 (Australia) Jakob Ruck; 36 (Canada) Benjamin Breault; 71 (Slovakia) Peter Hrehorcak (I); 89 (Australia) Riley Langille; 93 (Canada) Félix Plouffe (I); 98 (Australia) Finlay Gordon	31 (Australia) Corey Dang; 35 (Thailand) Austin Hoffman; 81 (Jamaica) Kolby Johnson	Head Coach: (Australia) John Kennedy (Interim); (Canada) Benjamin Breault (Apr-Aug); Coaches: (Australia) Jordan Kyros (AC); (Finland) Ville Tenosalmi (AC); (England) Marc Vaillancourt (AC); (Scotland) Richie Lamb (TM); (Australia) Ryan Langille (EM); Legend (C) Captain (A) Alternate Captain (I) Import player Statistics; Average age: 28.29; Average height: 181.69; Average weight: 82.03; Locals: 22; Imports: 5
Last updated on: 21 August 2026
Elite Prospects IHNA

=== Player records ===
These are the top-ten all-time/career player records in franchise history, for the following categories: appearances, goals, assists, points, and penalty minutes
Current as of 2024 AIHL season; figures are updated after each completed AIHL regular season.

All-time Appearances
#	Name	Pos	GP
1	(Australia) Jordan Kyros	F	257
2	(Australia) David Kudla	D	244
3	(New Zealand) Andrew Cox	F	232
4	(Australia) Jamie Woodman	D	198
5	(Australia) Robert Haselhurst	D	193
6	(Australia) Kieran Webster	F	181
7	(Australia) Jonathon Bremner	F	163
8	(Australia) Ben Breault	F	156
9	(Australia) Alastair Punler	D	156
10	(Australia) Samuel Wilson	F	139

All-time Goals
#	Name	Pos	G
1	(Australia) Ben Breault	F	105
2	(New Zealand) Andrew Cox	F	83
3	(Australia) Jordan Kyros	F	73
4	(Australia) Kieran Webster	F	49
5	(Australia) Robert Haselhurst	D	44
6	(Canada) Ken Rolph	F	41
7	(Canada) Jessyko Bernard	F	38
8	(Australia) Jonathon Bremner	F	38
9	(Canada) Pier Grandmaison	F	28
10	(United States) Phil Ginand	F	26

All-time Assists
#	Name	Pos	A
1	(Australia) Ben Breault	F	156
2	(Australia) Jordan Kyros	F	126
3	(New Zealand) Andrew Cox	F	111
4	(Australia) Robert Haselhurst	D	109
5	(Australia) David Kudla	D	71
6	(Australia) Jamie Woodman	D	69
7	(Australia) Kieran Webster	F	64
8	(Canada) Ken Rolph	F	52
9	(Australia) Samuel Wilson	D	51
10	(Canada) Jessyko Bernard	F	48

All-time Points
#	Name	Pos	Pts
1	(Australia) Ben Breault	F	261
2	(Australia) Jordan Kyros	F	199
3	(New Zealand) Andrew Cox	F	194
4	(Australia) Robert Haselhurst	D	153
5	(Australia) Kieran Webster	F	113
6	(Canada) Ken Rolph	F	93
7	(Australia) Jamie Woodman	D	87
8	(Canada) Jessyko Bernard	F	86
9	(Australia) Jonathon Bremner	F	83
10	(Australia) David Kudla	D	83

All-time Penalties
#	Name	Pos	PIM
1	(Australia) Alastair Punler	D	351
2	(Australia) Bradley Young	F	303
3	(Australia) Robert Haselhurst	D	270
7	(New Zealand) Andrew Cox	F	237
4	(Australia) Jonathon Bremner	F	182
5	(Australia) Greg Hyde	D	161
6	(Sweden) Daniel Göransson	D	159
8	(Australia) Simon Kudla	F	139
9	(Australia) David Kudla	F	136
10	(Australia) Samuel Wilson	D	131

== Team staff ==
Current as of 2024 AIHL season.

Thunder staff
Role	Name
Head coach	(Australia) Ben Breault
Assistant coach	(Finland) Ville Tenosalmi
Medic	(Australia) David Tran
Team manager	(Australia) Richie Lamb
Equipment manager	(Australia) Ryan Langille
General manager	(New Zealand) Andrew Cox
Governor	(United Kingdom) Stan Scott

== Leaders ==
=== Team captains ===
The first captain of the Perth Thunder was Samuel Wilson, who remained captain of the Western Australian team for five consecutive AIHL seasons. The Thunder have had a total of two captains in the team's history.

No.	Name	Term
1	(Australia) Samuel Wilson	2012–16
2	(Australia) Jamie Woodman	2017–Present

=== Head coaches ===
The first Head Coach for the Perth Thunder was Englishman Stan Scott. The Thunder have had a total of five head coaches in the team's history.

No.	Name	Term
1	(United Kingdom) Stan Scott	2012–13
2	(Australia) Dylan Forsythe	2014
3	(United Kingdom) Stan Scott (interim)	2014
4	(Australia) Dave Kenway	2015–16
5	(Australia) Dave Ruck	2017–19
6	(Australia) Ben Breault	2020–Present

=== General managers ===
Perth Thunder have had a total of two GMs. The Thunder's first general manager (GM) was Stan Scott.

No.	Name	Term
1	(United Kingdom) Stan Scott	2012–23
2	(New Zealand) Andrew Cox	2024–Present

== Broadcasting ==
Current:

- AIHL.TV (2023–present) – Worldwide paid subscription-based online video broadcasting published by the AIHL in partnership with the Swedish company StayLive AB platform using local production companies at each team's rink. The service went live in April 2023 in partnership with Clutch.TV, and would cover every AIHL regular season and finals games live and on demand. In 2024, the service expanded to offer Apple iOS and Andriod Play apps.
- Sportradar (2022 - present) – International online video broadcasting in North America and Europe as part of a league-wide 3-year deal signed in March 2022 in the lead up to the 2022 AIHL season.

Former:

- Kayo Sports (2022) – Domestic online video broadcasting in Australia as part of the league wide deal struck in the lead up to the 2022 AIHL season to show every AIHL game live.
- Fox Sports (2013 – 2019) – Part of the entire AIHL domestic TV broadcasting deal with Fox Sports to show one game a round, normally on Thursday's at 4:30 pm or after NHL games during NHL season.
- Mixlr (2016) - In 2016, the Thunder self-broadcast an online audio stream of all home games at the Perth Ice Arena. The organisation used the audio streaming platform Mixlr to deliver the production.
- Facebook (2017 - 2019) - Between 2017 and 2019, select Perth Thunder home games were self-broadcast by live stream from the Perth Ice Arena in Malaga on Facebook.

== See also ==
- Perth Inferno
- Australian Women's Ice Hockey League
