= Melbourne Mustangs =

- City: Melbourne, Victoria
- League: Australian Ice Hockey League
- Conference: Hellyer Conference
- Founded: 2010
- Operated: 2010–present
- Home arena: O'Brien Icehouse
- Colours: Black, orange, white
- President: John Belic
- CEO: Joyce Price
- Head coach: (Australia) David Ferrari
- Captain: (Canada) Scott Timmins
- Affiliates: Melbourne Chargers (Women's Tier 2)
- Website: mustangs.theaihl.com

Franchise history
- 2010–2011: Mustangs IHC
- 2012–present: Melbourne Mustangs

Championships
- H Newman Reid Trophies: 1 (2014)
- Goodall Cups: 2 (2014, 2023)

The Melbourne Mustangs (formally Mustangs IHC) is an Australian semi-professional ice hockey team from Melbourne, Victoria. Formed in 2010, the Mustangs have been a member of the Australian Ice Hockey League (AIHL) since 2011. The Mustangs are based at the O'Brien Icehouse in the Docklands district of Melbourne. The Mustangs are two time Goodall Cup and one time H Newman Reid Trophy winners.

== History ==
=== Pre AIHL ===
2010 Mustangs Ice Hockey Club roster
Goaltenders
(Australia) #25 Michael James	(Australia) #26 Fraser Carson	(Australia) #27 Mitchell Waters
Defencemen
(Australia) #12 Brendan Oakes	(Australia) #18 Mike McDowell	(Australia) #19 Troy Robertson	(Australia) #20 Tristan Muir
(Australia) #21 Travis Woods	(Australia) #22 Enrico Bergamin	(Australia) #23 Chris Drake	(Australia) #24 Ryan Bennett
Forwards
(Canada) #1 Scott Corbett (A)	(Canada) #2 Mike Thorburn	(Australia) #3 Steve Belic (A)	(Australia) #4 Matt Stringer
(Australia) #5 Andrew Belic	(Australia) #6 Jack Carpenter	(Australia) #7 Dean Dunstan	(Australia) #8 Jullius Vittika
(Australia) #9 Chris James	(Australia) #10 Damien Bright	(Australia) #11 Travis Alabaster	(Australia) #13 Brendan McDowell
(Australia) #14 Shane Hardy (C)	(Australia) #15 Jack McCoy	(Australia) #16 Adrian Nash	(Australia) #17 Andrew Fitzgerald
Coaching staff
(Australia) Steve Laforet (Head coach)

The Melbourne Mustangs was founded in 2010 as the Mustangs Ice Hockey Club (Mustangs IHC). The club looked to join the Australian Ice Hockey League in 2011. In preparation foundation club president John Belic held a number of try-out sessions and organised a number of exhibition matches for the Mustangs during the 2010 AIHL season. In May, the Mustangs finalised their first ever roster and selected Shane Hardy to captain the team for the six planned exhibition matches around Australia.

The first match occurred on 5 June 2010 at the Melbourne Icehouse against the visiting Western Thunder. Michael McDowell scored the first ever Mustangs goal in any match, with a blistering top-shelfer from the point for a 1–0 lead in the first period. The match was high scoring, the Thunder led 3–6 at the halfway point but the match ended 7–6 in favour of the Mustangs to give the club their first ever victory.

In the second match on 13 June, the Mustangs proved too good for the young Victorian Tange representative team, defeating them 9–0.

The Mustangs third match at the Icehouse was an international exhibition against Canada's Kelowna. The Mustangs iced 12 players over two lines. Kelowna brought with them 28 players. Unsurprisingly the Mustangs registered their first defeat with Kelowna beating them 7–4 after taking an early 4–0 lead.

The Mustangs then travelled to the Gold Coast to take on their first AIHL opposition, the Gold Coast Blue Tongues at Iceland ice Rink. In another high scoring affair, the Mustangs defeated the Gold Coast Blue Tongues 9–6. The result provided team management belief in the team's abilities to compete at the highest level in the AIHL. In the second match of the day the Mustangs overcame local side, Gold Coast Grizzlys, 16–2.

Following the conclusion of the 2010 season, The Mustangs applied for and were granted an AIHL licence to join the league in 2011. The AIHL imposed a condition of entry on the Mustangs that prevented them from incorporating 'Melbourne' into their name. The purpose of this condition was to protect the existing Melbourne Ice brand.

=== AIHL era ===
The Mustangs appointed Steve Laforet as their inaugural head coach for the 2011 AIHL season. Shane Hardy was named the club's first AIHL team captain. In the lead-up to the 2011 season, the Mustangs took on their new local rivals, the Melbourne Ice, in a warm-up match at Docklands. 14 April 2011, the Mustangs took part in the AIHL season opener at the Melbourne Icehouse against the Ice in the first ever AIHL Melbourne derby. The Ice won the match 8–4, condemning the Mustangs to their first ever AIHL defeat. The Mustangs registered their first ever AIHL victory on 16 April 2011, overcoming the Sydney Bears 6–2 at the Penrith Ice Palace. On 23 June 2011, Laforet announced his resignation as head coach for personal reasons. It was later revealed Laforet was temporarily stood down by the club as a result of an altercation at a game against the Gold Coast Blue Tongues. Assistant coach, Doug Stevenson, stepped in and took over for the rest of the season. At the end of the regular season, the Mustangs finished sixth in the league standings, ahead of the Canberra Knights and Sydney Bears.

In 2012, during the off-season before the new season started, the annual AIHL general meeting (AGM) sat and a decision was made to lift the restrictions on the Mustangs from using the geographical word 'Melbourne' from their brand with immediate effect. Four days later the Mustangs announced they had officially changed their brand and name to the Melbourne Mustangs. The Mustangs also appointed experienced Canadian Bill Wilkinson new head coach. Ontario-born Wilkinson was a long time NCAA head coach in the US and former Spanish national team head coach. The performances on the ice did not translate with Wilkinson's experience and by mid-season Wilkinson was replaced by the Mustangs assist coach and former head coach, Laforet. Under Laforet, the Mustangs registered five wins from eight matches but it was not enough to lift the team off the bottom of the Easton Conference at season's end.

Ahead of the 2013 season it was revealed the Mustangs and Laforet had parted company by mutual termination of Laforet's contract. The Mustangs would have to appoint a new head coach for the third season running. On 12 December 2012 the Melbourne Mustangs announced Brad Vigon as the new head coach of the team for 2013. Brad would be assisted by Ice Hockey Victoria stalwart Mark "Chuck" Connolly, providing the Mustangs a blend of youth and experience on the bench. On 7 February 2013 Mustangs CEO Rod Johns revealed the Mustangs had selected a new logo for the team. The Mustangs had completed a comprehensive consultation period with stakeholders, including fans, and selected a logo featuring a redesigned mustang horse, holding an ice hockey stick. Under the guidance of Vigon and Connolly, the Mustangs enjoyed their best AIHL season yet. The team finished fifth in the league standings, just missing out on finals. It was the Mustangs' highest ever regular season ranking at the time. It was also the first time the Mustangs had won more than ten matches and won more matches than they had lost.

2014 proved to be a breakout season for the Mustangs in the AIHL. It was the first season the Mustangs started without a new coach as Brad Vigon stayed on in charge. The 8–3 pre-season exhibition loss to the Melbourne Ice proved to be a poor indicator for the season ahead. The 2014 season ended up a very close season with a number of teams competing for top spot and the H Newman Reid Trophy. The Mustangs for the first time were challenging for the regular season title along with the Ice, CBR Brave and Sydney Ice Dogs. In the end the Mustangs proved too good and clinched the title and H Newman Reid Trophy by finishing three points ahead of the Ice in first place. It was the Mustangs' very first title and trophy and it qualified them for their first appearance at the AIHL finals weekend the following week. On 30 August 2014, the Mustangs faced the Sydney Ice Dogs at a packed Icehouse for semi-final one. In a hard-fought match that swung one way and then the other, the Mustangs prevailed, 6–4, to clinch a maiden Goodall Cup final birth. Gibbs-Sjödin and Bourke both scored twice and set up two other goals with Gibbs-Sjödin named first star of the match. The Ice won semi-final two, which set up a derby for the final. Both head coaches agreed the derby final would have a significant positive effect on the sport and the league in Australia. Derby form leading into the Goodal Cup final was with the Ice, who despite finishing behind the Mustangs in the final standings in the regular season, had continued to dominate the derby head-to-head, winning three of four matches in 2014. The Mustangs showed why form guides don't tell the final story in the final. In front of 2,000 people, the Mustangs put on a master-class display to run out 6–1 victors over the Ice. Viktor Gibbs-Sjodin led the way for the Mustangs with a hat trick of goals to his name, while goaltender Fraser Carson made 29 saves in the match. Gibbs-Sjodin was named finals MVP after the match and the Mustangs claimed their maiden AIHL championship and Goodall Cup.

In 2015, the Mustangs could not repeat their previous season's successes and the team finished sixth in the league and missed out on finals. In November, Brad Vigon announced his resignation from the head coaching role at the Mustangs with immediate effect as he felt the competing commitments between the team and his family was too great. He expressed his gratitude to the Mustangs organisation and advised he would still be seen around the rink in the future. A couple of weeks later, Vigon was named new head coach of the Australian national team (The Mightyroos) by Ice Hockey Australia.

For season 2016, the Melbourne Mustangs announced Vigon's replacement on 21 December 2015. Former assistant coach, Michael Flaherty, was appointed the Mustangs new head coach. Flaherty had been Vigon's assistant in 2015 and had previously held roles in state teams and in the AJIHL. The Mustangs finished the 2016 season in fifth place. In 2017, the team improved their overall position and finished fourth, qualifying for finals for the second time in franchise history. The Mustangs faced familiar opponents in the semi-finals, with the team drawn against the Melbourne Ice. The Ice had set a new league record for most points in the regular season so the Mustangs headed into the match as underdogs. The Ice took an early lead and by the end of the second period the Mustangs trailed by two goals. Mitch Humphries and Finnish import Anton Kokkonen led the Mustangs resurgence in the third period, both getting on the score sheet, but Ice forward Sebastian Ottosson scored an empty netter near the end of the match to claim the victory for the Ice. The Mustangs were eliminated.

In 2018, the Mustangs welcomed a new head coach after Flaherty stepped-down from the position. French Canadian, Maxime Langelier-Parent took over the role in addition to his playing commitments with the team. The Mustangs backed up their 2017 performance and again finished fourth in the league standings and qualified for the AIHL finals. It was the first time the Mustangs had qualified for finals two seasons in a row. The Mustangs came up against the CBR Brave in the semi-finals in 2018. Brett Ferguson scored for the Mustangs in the second period but that was the only highlight for the team in a match otherwise dominated by the Brave. The Mustangs ended up going down to the eventual champions, Brave, 1–5 to again repeat 2017 and get eliminated at the same semi-final stage.

In 2019, the Mustangs reached an agreement and signed a memoriam of understanding (MOU) with tier 2 women's team, Melbourne Chargers. The agreement sees resources and knowledge shared across the two organisations in the effort to grow the sport of ice hockey for both men and women. One of the goals of the partnership is to help develop the Chargers into a position to apply for a licence to the top level of women's hockey in Australia, the Australian Women's Ice Hockey League (AWIHL).

==== Pride Round ====
Since 2017, the Mustangs have hosted an annual Pride Round in support of the LGBTQIA+ community. President John Belic has stated: "Sport is such a massive part of my life and that of our family and forms the very fabric of many of our social interactions. I would hate to think what life would be like if we could not participate because of fear, discrimination or ridicule. The Melbourne Mustangs Ice Hockey Club firmly believes in equality, fairness and inclusion for all. Our annual Pride game showcases the club’s commitment to these values.

== Season-by-season results ==
Melbourne Mustangs all-time record
Season	Regular season												Finals									Top points scorer
Season	P	W	T	L	OW	OL	GF	GA	GD	Pts	Finish	Conf	P	W	L	GF	GA	Result	Preliminary-Final	Semi-Final	Goodall Cup Final	Name	Points
2010	Played 6 exhibition games as part of their AIHL licence application in preparation for joining the league in 2011^{1}
2011	28	8	–	17	2	1	107	132	-25	29	6th	–										(Canada) Scott Corbett	43
2012	24	5	–	16	1	2	54	107	-53	19	9th	5th										(Canada) Jake Ebner	17
2013	28	12	–	10	4	2	118	103	+15	46	5th	–										(United States) Patrick O'Kane	51
2014	28	17	–	8	0	3	108	88	+20	54	1st	–	2	2	0	12	5	Champion	–	Won 6-4 (Ice Dogs)	Won 6-1 (Ice)	(United States) Patrick O'Kane	44
2015	28	11	–	12	3	2	139	105	+34	41	6th	–										(United States) Patrick O'Kane	48
2016	28	11	–	15	2	0	89	102	-13	37	5th	–										(Australia) Jamie Bourke	32
2017	28	11	–	12	2	3	104	113	-9	40	4th	–	1	0	1	2	4	Semi-finalist	–	Lost 2-4 (Ice)	–	(Australia) Jamie Bourke	47
2018	28	12	–	12	2	2	106	97	+9	42	4th	–	1	0	1	1	5	Semi-finalist	–	Lost 1-5 (Brave)	–	(United Kingdom) Benjamin Davies	42
2019	28	12	–	11	1	4	108	99	+9	42	5th	–										(United States) Christian Isackson	41
2020	2020 and 2021 AIHL seasons were cancelled and not contested
2021	2020 and 2021 AIHL seasons were cancelled and not contested
2022	18	8	–	9	0	1	89	83	+6	28	4th	–	1	0	1	3	7	Semi-finalist	–	Lost 3-7 (Bears)	–	(Canada) Scott Timmins	45
2023	26	17	–	7	2	0	147	94	+53	55	4th	2nd	3	3	0	13	3	Champion	Won 8-3 (Lightning)	Won 4-0 (Bears)	Won 1-0 (Brave)	(Canada) Scott Timmins	82
2024	30	13	–	14	2	1	136	120	+16	44	6th	4th										(Canada) Scott Timmins	61
2025	28	11	–	15	2	0	127	143	-16	37	6th	–	1	0	1	2	5	Preliminary-finalist	Lost 2-5 (Thunder)	–	–	(Canada) Scott Timmins	47
2026	30	19	–	9	2	0	168	112	56	61	2nd	–	1	0	1	4	5	Semi-finalist	–	Lost 4-5(Brave)	–	(Canada) / (Australia) Scott Timmins	68
2027	–	–	–	–	–	–	–	–	–	–	–	–	–	–	–	–	–	–	–	–	–	–	–
Totals	380	167	–	167	25	21	1600	1498	+102	575			10	5	5	37	34

^{1} 2010 exhibition record: 6 games, 4 wins, 1 loss, 45 goals scored, 21 goals conceded. Details of one game is unknown.

Champions	Runners-up	Third place

== Championships ==
- Goodall Cup

(gold) :Champions (2): 2014, 2023

- H Newman Reid Trophy (replaced the V.I.P. Cup)

(gold) :Premiers (1): 2014

- Hellyer Conference Cup

(silver) :Runners-up (1): 2023

== Players ==
=== Current roster ===
Team roster for the 2026 AIHL season.

Melbourne Mustangs roster - 2026 AIHL season
Active roster		Inactive roster	Coaching staff
Goaltenders: 1 (Thailand) Austin Hoffman; 4 (Australia) Thomas Papas; 30 (Australia) Sebastian Woodlands; 31 (Canada) Noah Giesbrecht (I); Defencemen: 7 (Canada) Ryne Bodger (I); 9 (New Zealand) Jaxson Lane; 22 (Canada) Mike Giorgi (A); 26 (Canada) Philippe Caron (I); 41 (New Zealand) Callum Burns; 45 (Australia) Samuel Bartlett; 52 (Australia) Rowan Barrett; 59 (Japan) Yuki Sasaki (I); 67 (Australia) Maxim Astafyev	Forwards: 6 (Canada) Brody Crane (I); 8 (Canada) Adam Harper; 12 (Australia) Lachlan Sucher; 14 (Australia) Nick Ponomarev; 15 (Canada) Brody Lindal; 16 (Canada) Dean Klomp (A); 17 (Canada) Scott Timmins (C); 19 (Canada) Jordan Warren; 20 (Canada) Hayden Dawes; 21 (Australia) Joey Hughes; 25 (Australia) Keenan Nelson; 37 (Australia) Jett Porter; 44 (Australia) Artem Astafiev; 51 (Australia) Sean Jones; 57 (Australia) Lucas Hunter; 86 (Switzerland) Davide Gaeta (I); 88 (New Zealand) Robin Vortanov; 91 (United States) Matt Dorsey(I); 92 (New Zealand) Colin McIntosh	- (Australia) Alvin Chan; - (Australia) Anson Chan; - (Uzbekistan) Nikita Garal; - (Australia) William Simmonds; - (Australia) Tom Vandernet	Head Coach: (Australia) David Ferrari; Coaches: (Australia) Mike Semegen (AC); (Australia) Bryan Mackenzie (AC); (Canada) Scott Timmins (AC); (Australia) Matt Armstrong (CC); (Australia) Chris Browne (TM); (Australia) Dylan Kelso (TM); Legend (C) Captain (A) Alternate Captain (I) Import player Statistics; Average age: 27.20; Average height: 183.33 cm Average weight: 82.37 kg Locals: 23; Imports: 7
Last updated on: 15 August 2026
Elite Prospects IHNA

=== Player records ===
These are the top-ten all-time player records in franchise history for the following categories: Apperiences, goals, assists, points and penalty minutes
Current as of 2019 AIHL season
(Figures are updated after each completed AIHL regular season)

All-time Apperiences
#	Name	Pos	GP
1	(Australia) Matt Stringer	F	208
2	(Australia) Brendan McDowell	F	205
3	(Australia) Sean Jones	F	190
4	(Australia) Jamie Bourke	F	187
5	(Australia) Patrick O'Kane	F	163
6	(Australia) Andrew Belic	F	161
7	(Australia) Vadim Virjassov	F	160
8	(Australia) Damian Bright	D	155
9	(Australia) Jackson McCoy	D	153
10	(Australia) Stephen Belic	D	123

All-time Goals
#	Name	Pos	G
1	(Australia) Jamie Bourke	F	132
2	(Australia) Patrick O'Kane	F	120
3	(Australia) Brendan McDowell	F	64
4	(Australia) Vadim Virjassov	F	63
5	(Australia) Sean Jones	F	56
6	(Australia) Joey Hughes	F	39
7	(Australia) Matthew Anderson	F	27
8	(Sweden) Viktor Gibbs Sjödin	D	24
9	(Australia) Andrew Belic	F	24
10	(Australia) Matt Stringer	F	21

All-time Assists
#	Name	Pos	A
1	(Australia) Jamie Bourke	F	141
2	(Australia) Patrick O'Kane	F	120
3	(Australia) Brendan McDowell	F	91
4	(Australia) Vadim Virjassov	F	74
5	(Australia) Sean Jones	F	69
6	(United States) Jack Wolgemuth	D	47
7	(United States) Jeff Grant	F	46
8	(Sweden) Viktor Gibbs Sjödin	D	45
9	(Australia) Michael McMahon	D	38
10	(Australia) Andrew Belic	F	33

All-time Points
#	Name	Pos	Pts
1	(Australia) Jamie Bourke	F	273
2	(Australia) Patrick O'Kane	F	240
3	(Australia) Brendan McDowell	F	155
4	(Australia) Vadim Virjassov	F	137
5	(Australia) Sean Jones	F	125
6	(Australia) Joey Hughes	F	70
7	(Sweden) Viktor Gibbs Sjödin	D	69
8	(United States) Jack Wolgemuth	D	67
9	(Australia) Matthew Anderson	F	58
10	(Australia) Andrew Belic	F	57

All-time Penalties
#	Name	Pos	PIM
1	(Australia) Jamie Bourke	F	707
2	(Australia) Shane Hardy	F	210
3	(Australia) Troy Robertson	F	206
4	(Australia) Damian Bright	D	184
5	(Australia) Sean Jones	F	175
6	(Australia) Vadim Virjassov	F	155
7	(Australia) Ryan Bennett	D	154
8	(Australia) Andrew Belic	F	150
9	(Australia) Vincent Hughes	D	140
10	(Australia) Joey Hughes	F	135

== Club staff ==
Current as of 2026 AIHL season

Mustangs staff
Role	Name
President	John Belic
Vice President	Rod Johns
Chief Executive Officer	Joyce Price
Secretary	Sara Wilson
Treasurer	Sam Browne
General	Shelby Deacon, Elles Moore, Chris Browne, Helen Stooke, Alaska Green
Director of Hockey Operations	Jon Moses
Head Coach	David Ferrari
Assistant Coach	Mike Semegen, Bryan Mackenzie
Team Manager	Chris Browne
Equipment Manager	Wes Holmes, Dylan Kelso
Statistician	TBC
Sports Medicine Consultant	Emma Poynton
Strength & Conditioning Coach	Lyndsay Buchanan
Physiotherapist	Jen Stanghi, Madi Noone, Micheal Markewich
Doctor	Amber Pesendorfer
Marketing Director	TBC
Merchandise Manager	Helen Stooke
Digital & Social Media Manager	Alaska Green
Events Manager	Elles Moore
Commercial Operations Manager	Joyce Price
Sponsorship Manager	Joyce Price
Game Day Organiser	Shelby Deacon
Game Day Master of Ceremonies	Scott McNaughton
Game Day Music & Effects	Jayden Smith & Claudio Toro

== Leaders ==
=== Team captains ===
The Melbourne Mustangs have had a total of seven captains in the team's history. The Mustangs first captain in their 2010 exhibition year and inaugural AIHL season in 2011 was Shane Hardy.

Season	Captain	Alt Captain One	Alt Captain Two
2010	(Australia) Shane Hardy	(Canada) Scott Corbett	(Australia) Stephen Belic
2011	(Australia) Shane Hardy	(Canada) Scott Corbett	(Australia) Stephen Belic
2012	(Australia) Shane Hardy	(Canada) Scott Levitt	(Australia) Christopher James
2013	(Australia) Sean Jones	(Australia) Brendan McDowell	(Australia) Andrew Belic
2014	(Australia) Sean Jones	(Australia) Brendan McDowell	(United States) Patrick O'Kane
2015	(Australia) Sean Jones	(Australia) Brendan McDowell	(United States) Patrick O'Kane
2016	(United States) Patrick O'Kane	(Australia) Sean Jones	(Australia) Jamie Bourke
2017	(Australia) Michael McMahon	(Australia) Jamie Bourke	(Australia) Brendan McDowell
2018	(Australia) Michael McMahon	(Australia) Jamie Bourke	(Australia) Brendan McDowell
2019	(Australia) Michael McMahon	(Australia) Jamie Bourke	(Australia) Brendan McDowell
2022	(Australia) Brendan McDowell	(Australia) Stephen Belic	(Canada) Jordan Warren
2023	(Australia) Brendan McDowell	(Canada) Ty Wishart	(Australia) Sean Jones
2024	(Australia) Todd Cutter	(Australia) Michael McMahon	(Australia) Sean Jones
2025
2026	(Canada) Scott Timmins	(Canada) Dean Klomp	(Canada) Mike Giorgi

=== Head coaches ===
The Melbourne Mustangs have had a total of twelve head coaches in the team's history. Steve Laforet was the first head coach appointed by the Melbourne Mustangs for the AIHL in their inaugural season in 2011.

No.	Name	Term
1	(Australia) Steve Laforet	2010–11
2	(Australia) Doug Stevenson (interim)	2011
3	(Canada) Bill Wilkinson	2012
4	(Australia) Steve Laforet (interim)	2012
5	(Australia) Brad Vigon	2013–15
6	(Australia) Michael Flaherty	2016–17
7	(Canada) Maxime Langelier-Parent	2018–20
8	(United States) Steve Zanlunghi	2021
9	(Canada) Chris Lawrence	2022
10	(United States) Patrick McMahon	2023
11	(Australia) Jon Moses (interim)	2023
12	(Canada) Scott Timmins	2024-25
13	(Australia) David Ferrari	2026

== Identity ==
=== Name and colours ===
Special commemorative logo used in season 2020 to celebrate the 10th anniversary of the team's establishment.

The Mustangs have kept the same colours since foundation in 2010. Orange, black and white are the three primary colours the club uses for their identity. The colours are used in all aspects of the club including: uniforms, supporter merchandise, official media and digital production.

The Mustangs have gone through one major re-brand to its name since it was founded in 2010. In 2012 the AIHL lifted a restriction on the word 'Melbourne' that enabled the Mustangs to change its name from Mustangs Ice Hockey Club to Melbourne Mustangs Ice Hockey Club. The club updated their logo to match the new name but it was not until 2013 when the club presented a fully updated logo to signify their new identity.

Name history
#	Name	Term
1	Mustangs Ice Hockey Club	2010–11
2	Melbourne Mustangs	2012–Present

=== Facilities ===
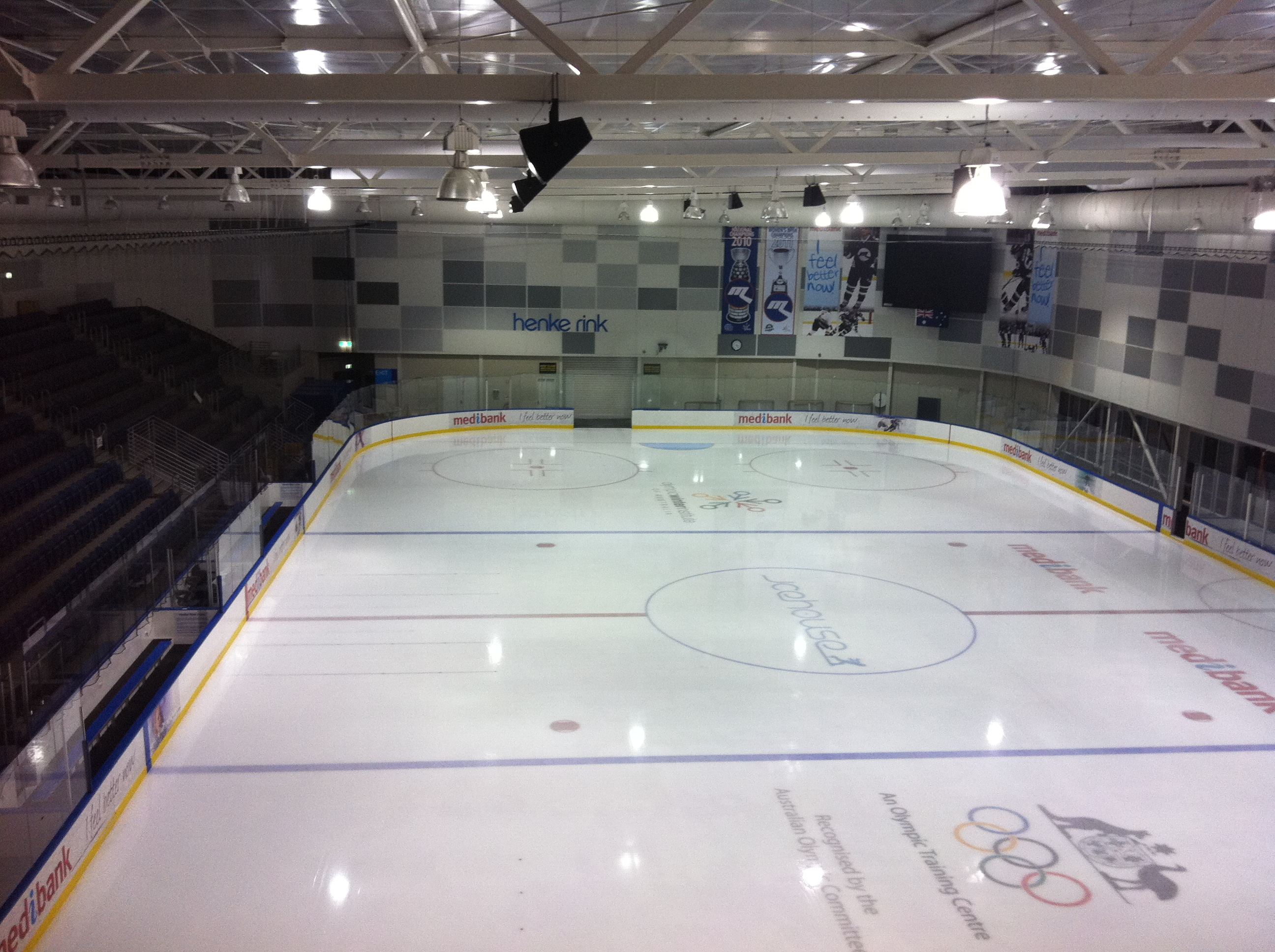
The Henke Rink inside the Icehouse, home of the Mustangs

Since inception in 2010, the Mustangs have been based out of the Melbourne Icehouse, located in the Docklands precinct of Melbourne. They have played all home matches in their AIHL history (2011 onwards) at the Icehouse. They share the facility with rivals, the Melbourne Ice. The Icehouse is the premier ice facility in Australia since it was built in 2010. The arena cost $58 million to build and is the only twin ice-sheet facility in Australia. The rink where ice hockey is played on is named the Henke Rink, in honour of Geoffrey Henke AO. The Icehouse has an Olympic sized ice surface, café, bar, specialist winter sports gym, pro shop, corporate boxes and seating for 1,000 spectators as well as room for additional 500 standing attendance on match days.

On the 9th of July 2026, the Mustangs announced a retail store at The District Docklands in collaboration with Globe International. They have given fans an opportunity to name this new store. As of the 11th of July 2026 the store has not been constructed, currently there are no details on how to enter.

=== Rivalries ===
Melbourne Ice

The Mustangs main rival is the Melbourne Ice. The two may share the same home venue but the Melbourne derby has developed into one of the big fixtures in the AIHL each season over the past ten years. The derbies are regular sell out matches during the regular season and are known to be heavily physical affairs with high numbers of penalties minutes. There have been two Melbourne derby matches in AIHL finals history, including one Goodall Cup final. The Mustangs and Ice share the spoils in these matches with one win apiece.

== Broadcasting ==
Current:

- ESPN (2025-2026) - 2025 Finals were broadcast on ESPN with 2026 announced. During 2026 one AIHL game a week was broadcast on ESPN.
- AIHL.TV (2023–present) – Worldwide paid subscription-based online video broadcasting published by the AIHL in partnership with the Clutch.TV platform using local production companies at each team’s rink. The service went live in April 2023, and would cover every AIHL regular season and finals games live and on demand.
- Sportradar (2022 - present) – International online video broadcasting in North America and Europe as part of a league-wide 3-year deal signed in March 2022 in the lead up to the 2022 AIHL season.

Former:

- Kayo Sports (2022) – Domestic online video broadcasting in Australia as part of the league wide deal struck in the lead up to the 2022 AIHL season to show every AIHL game live in 2022.
- Fox Sports (2013 – 2019) – Part of the entire AIHL domestic TV broadcasting deal with Fox Sports to show one game a round, normally on Thursday's at 4:30 pm or after NHL games during NHL season.
- YouTube (2017 - 2019) - Between 2017 and 2019 the Melbourne Mustangs home games where live streamed from the Iceohouse in Melbourne on the YouTube platform through ATC Productions. The broadcast was called "AIHL TV" and was a partnership between ATC Productions, the AIHL, Melbourne Mustangs and Melbourne Ice. All matches are also available on-demand.
