= Sydney Bears =

- City: Macquarie Park, New South Wales
- League: Australian Ice Hockey League
- Conference: Hellyer
- Founded: 1 July 1982 (44 years ago)
- Home arena: Macquarie Ice Rink
- Colours: Red, black, white
- President: Bianca Musico
- General manager: (Australia) Nathan Graham
- Head coach: (Canada) Ryan Annesley
- Captain: (Canada) Ryan Annesley
- Affiliates: Sydney Bears IHC (IHNSW); Penrith Raptors (ECSL); Sydney Sting (ECSL); Sydney Bombers (ECSL); Reach Rebels (ECSL)
- Website: sydneybears.com

Franchise history
- 1982–1997: Macquarie Bears
- 1997–2007: Sydney Bears
- 2007–2009: AIHL Bears
- 2010–present: Sydney Bears

Championships
- Conference titles: 2 (2023, 2024)
- H Newman Reid Trophies: 4 (2000, 2002, 2008, 2024)
- Goodall Cups: 3 (2002, 2007, 2019)

The Sydney Bears (formerly known as the Macquarie Bears) are an Australian semi-professional ice hockey team from Sydney, New South Wales. Established in 1982, the Bears are the only remaining founding member of the Australian Ice Hockey League (AIHL) still operating. The Bears are based at Macquarie Ice Rink, within the Macquarie Centre, in the northern suburbs of Sydney. The Sydney Bears are three time Goodall Cup champions and four time H Newman Reid Trophy premiers.

== History ==
=== Prior to AIHL ===
The Sydney Bears was founded on 1 July 1982 as the Macquarie Bears Ice Hockey Club Incorporated. The team was formed concurrently to the non-incorporated local ice hockey club sharing the same name. The Bears were based out of the Macquarie Ice Rink. The club competed in the NSW Super League (NSWSL) and then the East Coast Super League (ECSL). In 1989 the Bears claimed the NSWSL championship with star defenceman Glen Foll claiming top points scorer for the season. In 1997 the club decided to change its name to the Sydney Bears Ice Hockey Club in preparation for a new national competition. In September 1999, the Bears won the East Coast Super League after defeating the Canberra Knights in a two match grand final series held at Phillip Ice Skating Centre, Canberra. In game one, on 18 September, the Bears fought their way to a close a 6–5 victory over the hosts. In game two, on 19 September, Sydney's goalkeeper Alan Becken claimed a shutout as the Bears won 5–0.

=== AIHL era ===
==== 2000–10 ====
Logo used from 2000 to 2007. Changed when the Bears moved to Penrith

In 2000, the Australian Ice Hockey league (AIHL) was established. The league adopted a franchise arrangement for competing teams so the Sydney Bears set up their incorporation as The Bears AIHL Inc. and were granted an AIHL licence.

The Sydney Bears claimed the inaugural AIHL season premiership by finishing top of the round-robin season involving the Bears, Adelaide Avalanche and Canberra Knights. The Bears were defeated by the Avalanche, 6–5 in a shootout in the single match championship final.

The Sydney Bears backed up this performance and made the championship final in 2001. They were again defeated by the Adelaide Avalanche, 10–7. The Bears did find success in the Goodall Cup tournament in 2001. Held in Newcastle, it was the last Goodall Cup tournament held independently to the AIHL.

In 2002, the Bears had a breakout AIHL season. The team left Macquarie and moved to the new Sydney Ice Arena in Baulkham Hills. The league doubled in size to six teams and the Bears finished the season first in the table to claim their second premiership. They faced a familiar foe, Adelaide Avalanche, in the first Goodall Cup Final for the AIHL. In Blacktown Ice Arena, the Bears defeated Adelaide 5–4 in a shootout to clinch the Goodall Cup and claim their first AIHL Championship.

In 2003, the AIHL adopted a new finals format that involved the top four teams from the regular season. The Sydney Bears were involved in and won the one and only third place play-off in an AIHL finals weekend. The Bears continued their rivalry with Adelaide and defeated them 10–5 in the match to claim third. From 2004 the AIHL tweaked the finals format to remove this match.

The Bears next found success in 2007 and 2008. In 2007, the Sydney Bears changed their name to the AIHL Bears (or simply the Bears) as the team left Sydney for Penrith. The team played out of the Penrith Ice Palace. The Bears won their second championship and Goodall Cup by defeating the Newcastle North Stars 3–2 in overtime in the final. The Bears also won the inaugural Wilson Cup in 2007. In 2008, the Bears claimed the H Newman Reid Trophy for the first time by finishing top of the league table ahead of the Western Sydney Ice Dogs. The Bears also claimed back-to-back Wilson Cups after defeating the Ice Dogs in the pre-season tournament's final 6–4.

==== 2010–20 ====
To start the new decade, in 2010, the team rebranded and changed their name back to the Sydney Bears. The team switched between Penrith and Sydney Ice Arena over the course of seven seasons. In 2017, Macquarie Ice Rink, at a cost of $3 million, had been upgraded to AIHL standards providing the Bears the opportunity to return to their spiritual home. The Bears, along with the Ice Dogs, moved into the newly renovated arena located within the Macquarie Centre. The upgrade of Macquarie Ice Rink also brought back the Sydney Bears (IHNSW) club to Macquarie. Since the move in 2017, the AIHL team and the IHNSW club have increased cooperation and support between the two clubs. Ex AIHL Bear's players have been taking up coaching roles within the IHNSW club while the IHNSW Bears provides the AIHL team a pathway for local players. In 2018, prior to the season starting, the Bears unveiled a new team logo to signify their return home to Macquarie.

On the ice, the Bears struggled to find form. The team spent seven consecutive seasons failing to reach the AIHL finals weekend between 2011 and 2017. In 2018 the team's fortunes began to improve. The Bears finished second in the league and made their first appearance in the Goodall Cup final in eleven years. They were defeated 4–3 in overtime by the CBR Brave but their display and spirit was praised. In 2019, the Sydney Bears surprised many and went one better and clinched their third Goodall Cup. It was their second Cup success after finishing the regular season in fourth place. The Bears defeated the Perth Thunder, 5–2 in the final.

== Season-by-season results ==
Sydney Bears all-time record
Season	Regular season											Finals									Wilson Cup	Top points scorer
Season	P	W	T	L	OW	OL	GF	GA	GD	Pts	Finish	P	W	L	GF	GA	Result	Preliminary Final	Semi Final	Goodall Cup Final	Wilson Cup	Name	Points
2000	Information not available										1st	1	0	1	5	6	Runner-up	–	–	Lost 5–6 (SO) (Avalanche)	–	Information not available
2001	16	7	1	8	–	–	70	74	−4	15	2nd	1	1	–	10	7	Runner-up	–	–	Lost 7–10 (Avalanche)	–	Information not available
2002	20	16	1	3	–	–	126	69	+57	33	1st	1	1	–	1	0	Champion	–	–	Won 5–4 (SO) (Avalanche)	–	(Australia) Murray Wand	27
2003 (Note: 2003 AIHL season statistics are unofficial. The AIHL has not published official statistics on www.theaihl.com. Data has been collected from web archives of the Newcastle Northstars and Ice Hockey Australia game reports.)	20	12	–	8	–	–	84	72	+12	26	3rd	2	1	1	14	12	Third (Note: 2003 was the one and only season where a third place play-off was contested as part of the finals format for the AIHL. The Sydney Bears defeated the Adelaide Avalanche 10–5 in the third place play-off to clinch third.)	–	Lost 4–7 (North Stars)	–	–	(Czech Republic) Vladimir Rubes	14
2004	20	8	1	6	1	4	68	71	−3	31	3rd	1	–	1	4	5	Semi-finalist	–	Lost 4–5 (Ice Dogs)	–	–	(Canada) Trent Ulmer	24
2005	26	11	–	12	2	1	96	100	−4	38	4th	1	–	1	3	6	Semi-finalist	–	Lost 3–6 (Avalanche)	–	–	(United States) Andy Luhovy	33
2006	28	15	–	11	1	1	133	101	+32	48	5th	–									–	(Czech Republic) Vladan Stransky	57
2007	28	14	–	8	4	2	112	84	+28	49 (Note: The Bears were penalised 3 competition points for icing players that had not been officially cleared to play by the IIHF and IHA.)	4th	2	2	–	7	3	Champion	–	Won 4–1 (Avalanche)	Won 3–2 (OT) (North Stars)	Winner	(Czech Republic) Tomas Landa	62
2008	28	20	–	7	–	1	134	118	+16	61	1st	1	–	1	5	7	Semi-finalist	–	Lost 5–7 (North Stars)	–	Winner	(Czech Republic) Vladan Stransky	63
2009	24	1	–	20	3	–	66	140	−74	9	7th	–									Group	(Czech Republic) Vladimir Rubes	36
2010	24	12	–	8	1	3	82	90	−8	41	3rd	1	–	1	1	2	Semi-finalist	–	Lost 1–2 (Ice)	–	–	(Czech Republic) Vladimir Rubes	34
2011	28	2	–	21	2	3	83	151	−68	13	8th	–									–	(Canada) Michael Schlamp	45
2012	24	9	–	12	2	1	92	93	−1	32	6th	–									–	(Czech Republic) Tomas Landa	58
2013	28	7	–	20	–	1	73	120	−47	22	7th	–									–	(Czech Republic) Tomas Landa	33
2014	28	6	1 (Note: As of the 2006 AIHL season, all games have a winner, which eliminated the tie from the league. In 2014 due to the cancellation of a game against Adelaide Adrenaline, the AIHL declared the result a tie.)	19	1	1	88	125	−57	22	8th	–									Group	(Canada) Hamilton Steen	31
2015	28	11	–	14	1	2	110	110	+0	37	7th	–									Runner-up	(United States) Joe Harcharik	52
2016	28	5	–	15	5	3	77	95	−18	28	6th	–									Winner	(Czech Republic) Tomas Landa	33
2017	28	6	–	14	3	3	101	121	−20	33	6th	–									Winner	(United States) Jackson Brewer	45
2018	28	15	–	7	3	3	104	72	+32	54	2nd	2	1	1	6	4	Runner-up	–	Won 3–0 (Thunder)	Lost 3–4 (OT) (Brave)	Runner-up	(United States) Charlie Adams	54
2019	28	15	–	11	2	–	121	102	+19	49	4th	2	2	0	11	6	Champion	–	Won 6–4 (Brave)	Won 5–2) (Thunder)	Winner	(Canada) Danick Gauthier	53
2020	2020 and 2021 AIHL seasons were cancelled and not contested
2021	2020 and 2021 AIHL seasons were cancelled and not contested
2022	20	10	–	8	2	–	105	93	+12	34	3rd	2	1	1	10	7	Prelim-finalist	Won 7–3 (Mustangs)	Lost 3–4 (OT) (Northstars) (Note: In 2022, the preliminary Final was the second game of the Finals format rather than the first, as it was in following seasons. The Bears qualified for the preliminary-final after winning the minor semi-final and played the loser of the major semi-final for a spot in the grand final.)	–	Winner	(Australia) Tomas Landa	38
2023	26	21	–	5	–	–	132	81	+51	60 (Note: The Bears were penalised 3 competition points on 26 July 2023 for breaching import player rules under the AIHL's player points policy. The Bears accidentally had more than the allowed import players on their active roster at a single time.)	2nd	1	0	1	0	4	Semi-finalist	–	Lost 0–4 (Mustangs)	–	Winner	(United States) Ace Cowans	33
2024	30	23	–	5	1	1	166	103	+63	72	1st	1	0	1	2	5	Semi-finalist	–	Lost 2–5 (Brave)	–	Winner	(United States) Adam Kadlec	70
2025	Withdrew from season due to Macquarie Ice Rink renovations
2026	–	–	–	–	–	–	–	–	–	–	–	–	–	–	–	–	–	–	–	–	Runner-up	–	–
Totals	558	246	4	242	34	30	2223	2185	+38			19	9	10	79	74

Notes:

Notes References:

Champions	Runners-up	Third place

== Championships ==
- Goodall Cup

(gold) Champions (3): 2002, 2007, 2019
(silver) Runners-Up (3): 2000, 2001, 2018

- H Newman Reid Trophy (2008–Current)

(gold) Premiers (2): 2008, 2024
(silver) Runners-Up (2): 2018, 2023

- Hellyer Conference

(gold) Winners (2): 2023, 2024

- Wilson Cup

(gold) Winners (8): 2007, 2008, 2016, 2017, 2019, 2022, 2023, 2024
(silver) Runners-Up (2): 2015, 2018

- V.I.P. Cup (2004–07)^{1}

(gold) Premiers (2): 2000, 2002
(silver) Runners-Up (1): 2001

- East Coast Super League

(gold) Champions (1): 1999

- NSW Super League

(gold) Champions (1): 1989

^{1} This list includes Premierships prior to the first trophy for Premiers in 2004.

== Players ==
=== Current roster ===
Team roster for the 2026 AIHL season.

Sydney Bears roster - 2026 AIHL season
Active roster		Inactive roster	Coaching staff
Goaltenders: 28 (Australia) Anthony Kimlin; 60 (United States) Hayden Plimley; 73 (Australia) Connor Dowell; 73 (Russia) Kirill Friesen; Defencemen: 12 (Canada) Alexandre Gauthier (I); 16 (Canada) Ryan Annesley (C); 25 (England) Geoff O'Hara; 41 (Australia) Mac Tutton; 43 (Australia) Connor Wardlaw; 73 (United States) Kevin Sadovski (I); 88 (Australia) Tyrone Oxlade; 97 (Australia) Tyerell Clare (A)	Forwards: 7 (Australia) Joseph Braun; 10 (Sweden) Taegan Rippon; 11 (Canada) Dexton Mozell; 18 (Australia) Kenshin Hayashi; 19 (Australia) Noah Moncrieff; 21 (United States) Brian Chambers (I); 23 (Australia) Alexander Wardlaw; 24 (Australia) Tomas Landa; 29 (Australia) Logan Brodie; 37 (Canada) Finn Withey; 49 (Australia) Eugene Ju; 54 (United States) Lucas Herrmann (A/I); 67 (United States) Nick Seitz (I); 82 (France) Louis Olive (I); 84 (Australia) Adrian Esposito; 92 (Australia) Bodie Jerome; 93 (Australia) Colby Shumak; 96 (Australia) Ruben Nalos	6 (England) Richard Crowe (I); 8 (Australia) Thomas Moncrieff; 9 (Denmark) Gustav Remler-Jensen; 22 (Australia) Hugo Arps; 31 (Australia) James Downie; 33 (Canada) Dane Brumm (I); 72 (Canada) Brett Bamber (I); 77 (Australia) Tim Newmark; - (Australia) Riley Knapp	Head Coach: (Canada) Ryan Annesley (Interim); (Finland) Christer Nylund (Apr-May); Coaches: (Australia) Nikolas Dimopoulos (AC); Legend (C) Captain (A) Alternate Captain (I) Import player Statistics; Average age: 26.32; Average height: 181.21 cm Average weight: 82.03 kg Locals: 25; Imports: 6
Last updated on: 15 August 2026
Elite Prospects

=== Player records ===
These are the top-ten all-time player records in franchise history for the following categories: Appearances, Goals, Assists, Points, Penalty minutes
(Figures are updated after each completed AIHL regular season)

As of 2024 AIHL Season

All-time Appearances
#	Name	Pos	GP
1	(Australia) Adrian Esposito	F	327
2	(Australia) Vladimir Rubes	F	299
3	(Australia) Michael Schlamp	D	291
4	(Australia) Brett Nelson-Bond	F	270
5	(Australia) Tomas Landa	F	194
6	(Australia) Tyerell Clare	D	194
7	(Australia) Paul Shumak	F	187
8	(Australia) Murray Wand	D	180
9	(Australia) Brian Funes	D	178
10	(Australia) Steven Adams	D	151

All-time Goals
#	Name	Pos	G
1	(Australia) Vladimir Rubes	F	176
2	(Australia) Tomas Landa	F	142
3	(Australia) Michael Schlamp	D	128
4	(Australia) Vladan Stransky	F	101
5	(Australia) Murray Wand	D	77
6	(Australia) Brett Nelson-Bond	F	54
7	(Australia) Roberto Franchini	F	43
8	(Australia) Thomas Steven	F	37
9	(Australia) Cameron Todd	F	36
10	(Australia) Paul Shumak	F	34

All-time Assists
#	Name	Pos	A
1	(Australia) Vladimir Rubes	F	270
2	(Australia) Tomas Landa	F	212
3	(Australia) Michael Schlamp	D	196
4	(Australia) Vladan Stransky	F	154
5	(Australia) Ryan Annesley	F	122
6	(Australia) Murray Wand	D	84
7	(Australia) Brett Nelson-Bond	F	63
8	(Australia) Tyerell Clare	D	60
9	(Australia) Jeremy Brücker	F	55
10	(Australia) Roberto Franchini	F	53

All-time Points
#	Name	Pos	Pts
1	(Australia) Vladimir Rubes	F	446
2	(Australia) Tomas Landa	F	354
3	(Australia) Michael Schlamp	D	324
4	(Australia) Vladan Stransky	F	255
5	(Australia) Murray Wand	D	161
6	(Australia) Ryan Annesley	D	153
7	(Australia) Brett Nelson-Bond	F	117
8	(Australia) Roberto Franchini	F	96
9	(Australia) Jeremy Brücker	F	83
10	(Australia) Cameron Todd	F	82

All-time Penalties
#	Name	Pos	PIM
1	(Australia) Spencer Austin	D	578
2	(Australia) Michael Schlamp	D	527
3	(Australia) Brett Nelson-Bond	F	469
4	(Australia) Tyerell Clare	D	418
5	(Australia) Vladimir Rubes	F	351
6	(Australia) Vladan Stransky	F	304
7	(Australia) Brian Funes	D	273
8	(Australia) Murray Wand	D	263
9	(Australia) Paul Shumak	F	235
10	(Australia) Jeremy Brücker	F	232

Legend:

Current Bears player

== Staff ==
Current as of 2024 AIHL season.

Bears staff
Role	Name
Head coach	(Canada) Ryan Annelsey
Assistant coach	(Australia) Nikko Dimopoulos
Analytics coach	(Canada) Shawn Rooke
Team manager	(Canada) Nick Austin
Equipment manager	(Australia) Lee Moncrieff
Medic	(Australia) Kasey Arkinstall
Trainer	(Australia) Laurence Kim
Governor	(Australia) Nathan Graham
President	(Australia) Bianca Musico
Secretary	(Australia) Marlon Dionisio
Treasurer	(Australia) Scott Graham

== Team facilities ==
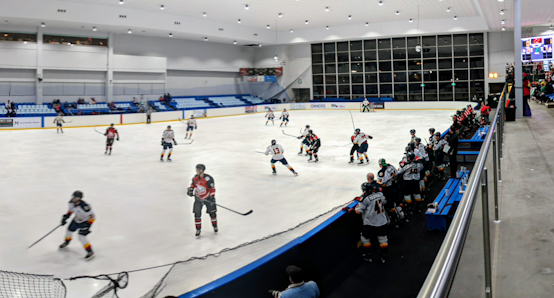
Macquarie Ice Rink, the Bears' spiritual home and current home barn since 2017

The Sydney Bears' current home venue is the Macquarie Ice Rink, located within the Macquarie Shopping Centre in Macquarie, Sydney. The Macquarie facility consists of an Olympic sized rink (60m x 30m) with seating for approximately 2,000 people.

Macquarie is the spiritual home of the Bears, as the team called Macquarie home from foundation in 1982 till 2002. In 2002 the team moved to the recently constructed Sydney Ice Arena in Baulkham Hills, Sydney. After five years the team moved out of Sydney and into the Penrith Ice Palace, Penrith, New South Wales, out west of the city. In 2012 the Bears returned to Sydney and to the Sydney Ice Arena. In late 2013 / early 2014 it was announced that the ownership of the Sydney Ice Arena, Hillsong, had lodged a development application with the NSW Government to re-develop the site into a residential complex, removing the twelve year old ice rink. The Bears moved back to Penrith for the 2015 and 2016 AIHL seasons. In 2017 it was announced that the Bears would return home to Macquarie to play out of the newly upgraded Macquarie Ice Rink, which now met AIHL standards.

Stadium history
Rink	Location	Term
Macquarie Ice Rink	Macquarie	1982–01
Sydney Ice Arena	Baulkham Hills	2002–06
Penrith Ice Palace	Penrith	2007–11
Sydney Ice Arena	Baulkham Hills	2012–14
Penrith Ice Palace	Penrith	2015–16
Macquarie Ice Rink	Macquarie	2017–Present

== Leaders ==
=== Team captains ===
The Bears have had seven captains in the team's known history.

No.	Name	Term
1	(Australia) Tyler Lovering	2001
2	(Australia) Don Burke	2002
3	(Australia) Tyler Lovering	2003–04
4	(Australia) Murray Wand	2005–08
5	(Australia) Vladimir Rubes	2009–10
6	(Australia) Michael Schlamp	2010–19
7	(Australia) Brian Funes	2022
8	(Australia) Ryan Annesley	2023–Present

=== Head coaches ===
The Bears have had four head coaches in the team's known history, with Vladimir Rubes taking the position in three stints.

No.	Name	Term
1	(Australia) Vladimir Rubes	2001–05
2	(Canada) Kelly Lovering	2006
3	(Australia) Vladimir Rubes	2007–15
4	(Australia) Ron Kuprowsky	2016–23
5	(United States) Tyler Huberty	2024
6	(Australia) Vladimir Rubes	2024
7	(Canada) Ryan Annesley	2026

=== General managers ===
The Bears have had three general managers in the team's known history.

No.	Name	Term
1	(Australia) Wayne Hellyer	2000–19
2	(Australia) Matthew Burrell	2020–21
3	(Australia) Nathan Graham	2022–Present

== Broadcasting ==
Current:

- AIHL.TV (2023–present) – Worldwide paid subscription-based online video broadcasting published by the AIHL in partnership with the Swedish company StayLive AB platform using local production companies at each team's rink. In Sydney, Thought Fox Media Group is the local production company. The service went live in April 2023 in partnership with Clutch.TV, and would cover every AIHL regular season and finals games live and on demand. In 2024, the service expanded to offer Apple iOS and Android Play apps.
- Sportradar (2022–present) – International online video broadcasting in North America and Europe as part of a league-wide 3-year deal signed in March 2022 in the lead up to the 2022 AIHL season.

Former:

- Kayo Sports (2022) – Domestic online video broadcasting in Australia as part of the league wide deal struck in the lead up to the 2022 AIHL season to show every AIHL game live.
- Fox Sports (2013 – 2019) – Part of the entire AIHL domestic TV broadcasting deal with Fox Sports to show one game a round, normally on Thursday's at 4:30 pm or after NHL games during NHL season.
- Self-broadcast (2015 – 2019) – Between 2015 and 2019 the Sydney Bears self-broadcast all home matches with an online audio stream utilising the Mixlr platform. Eric Brook and Nicholas Kutnjak called the play by play with various co commentators joining the team during the season.
