= Perth Ice Arena =

Ice sport facility in Perth, Western Australia

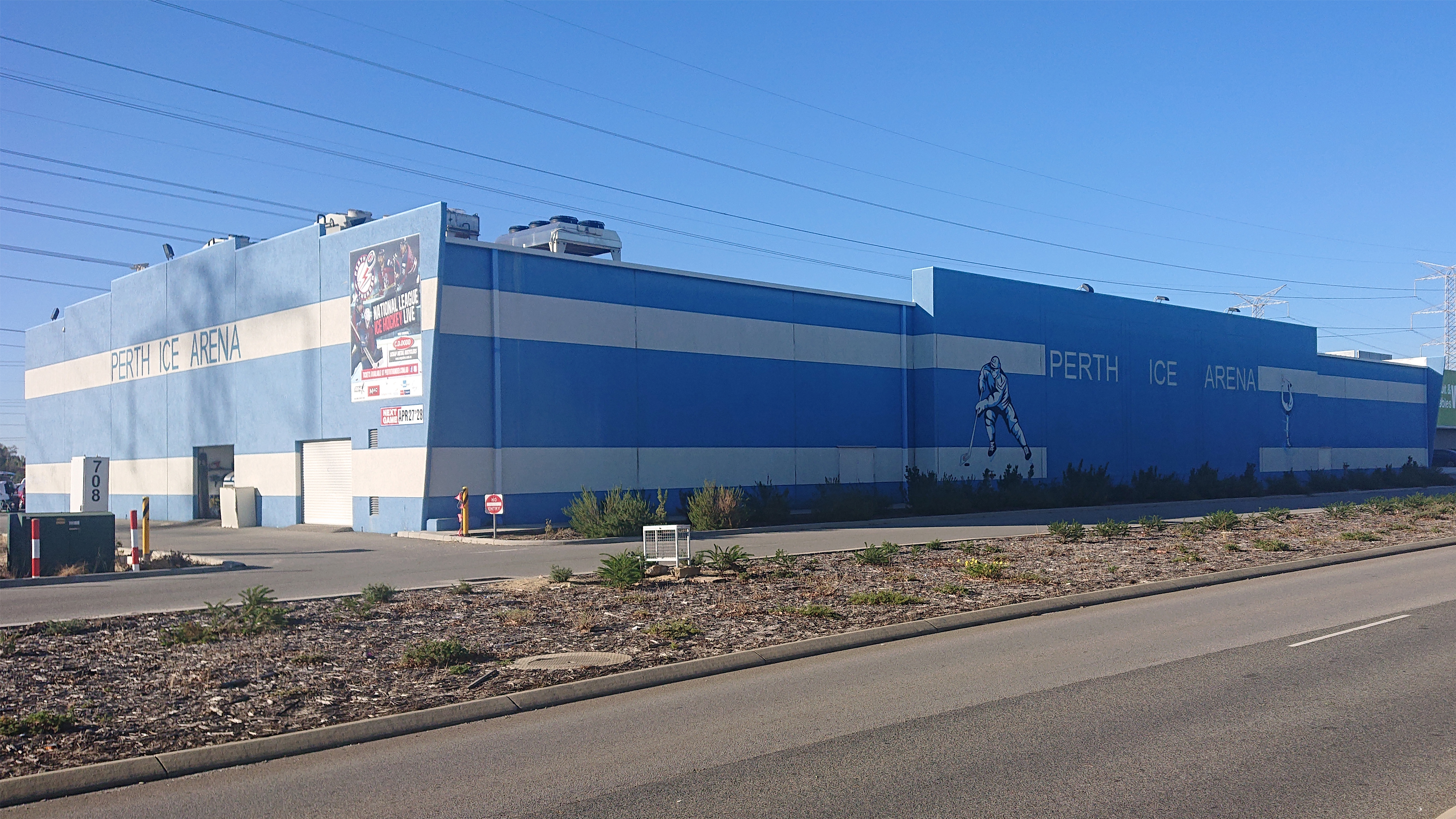
- Interactive map of Perth Ice Arena
- Location: 708 Marshall Road, Malaga WA 6090
- Coordinates: 31°51′25″S 115°54′17″E
- Capacity: 600 (seating)
- Surface: 60 m × 30 m (197 ft × 98 ft)

Construction
- Opened: 2009 (17 years ago)

Tenants
- Perth Thunder (2012-present); West Coast Ice Hockey Club (present)

Website
- www.perthicearena.com

The Perth Ice Arena (also known as Perth Ice Arena Center) is an ice sports and public skate center, built in 2009 and located in the suburb of Malaga, in Perth Western Australia. The arena serves as the home ice rink for the Perth Thunder in the Australian Ice Hockey League , West Coast Ice Hockey Club and Northern Ice Hockey Club who compete in WA state leagues.

== Events ==
Perth Ice Arena regularly hosts figure skating (including academy), ice hockey, functions (including birthday parties, social clubs, bucks and hens nights and youth groups), disco nights and general public sessions.

Since 2012, the arena has annually hosted fourteen regular season Australian Ice Hockey League (AIHL) matches involving Perth Thunder between the months of April and August.

The Perth Ice Arena in 2016 played host to one of the USA vs Canada Ice Hockey Classic exhibition matches. Team Canada defeated Team USA 6-5 in a shootout in game two. The series has been running since 2015 and has brought a number of current and past NHL players and coaches along with a host of AHL and ECHL players to Australia and New Zealand during that time. Players and coaches donate their time to raise money for the STOP CONCUSSIONS Foundation and awareness of the sport of ice hockey to Australia and New Zealand.

== See also ==
- List of ice rinks in Australia
- Sport in Western Australia
