= Macquarie Ice Rink =

Public ice rink in New South Wales, Australia

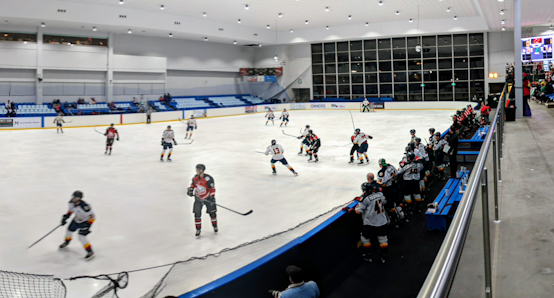
- Interactive map of Macquarie Ice Rink
- Location: Macquarie Shopping Centre, Herring Rd &, Waterloo Rd, Macquarie Park NSW 2113
- Coordinates: 33.776950°S 151.119542°E
- Capacity: 2000 (seating)
- Surface: 60 m × 30 m (197 ft × 98 ft)

Construction
- Opened: 1981 (45 years ago)

Tenants
- Sydney Bears (2017–present); Sydney Ice Dogs (2017–present); Macquarie Bears (1982–2001)

Website
- www.macquarieicerink.com.au

The Macquarie Ice Rink is an ice sports and public skate centre, opened in 1981 and located within the Macquarie Shopping Centre in the northern Sydney suburb of Macquarie Park, New South Wales, Australia. It is the current home of the Sydney Bears and Sydney Ice Dogs AIHL ice hockey teams. It was under renovation since May 2025, but reopened on December 20, 2025.

== History ==
The Macquarie Ice Rink was opened in 1981 as a recreational and sporting ice venue in northern Sydney.

In 1982, The Macquarie Bears ice hockey club was founded and played hockey matches from elite to development grade at Macquarie Ice Rink until 2002 when the club moved to Blacktown Ice Rink and the AIHL team moved to the Sydney Ice Arena.

Macquarie Ice Rink completed a one-year construction of a multi-million dollar upgrade to the venue on 23 March 2017. A new 15 square metre LCD screen was added, a new ice surface formed on top of new flooring, two new Zamboni's purchased, a new enclosed café built, a purpose-built gym and other general amenity upgrades.

In April 2017, the upgrades to the rink brought Macquarie back up to standards for the AIHL, the national level hockey in Australia. The Sydney Bears, originally from Macquarie, announced they would return ‘home’ and play home matches at Macquarie Ice Rink from 2017 onwards. In additional the venue gained another major ongoing tenant with Liverpool's Sydney Ice Dogs also announcing they would move to Macquarie to share the new facilities with their derby rivals.

Macquarie Ice Rink ownership released a media statement on 16 January 2019 revealing that AMP Capital, the owners of the Macquarie shopping Centre, plans to demolish the Macquarie Ice Rink, located on the first floor of the shopping centre. The demolition of the rink would create greater access to the train station and bus interchange to and from the shopping centre. It was revealed AMP lodged the stage 2 $195 million development plans on 18 December 2018, prior to Christmas. AMP's response to the media release stated the desire of the development was to improve accessibility and foster a more vibrant night life in the community. AMP revealed its design could accommodate a recreational sized rink. The community responded by creating petitions to save the Olympic sized rink

The petition to save the rink attracted 20,000 plus signatures; On 18 January 2019, AMP Capital announced a halt to demolition plans to pursue additional community consultation regarding the development.

Following over 60,000 petition protestors, AMP Capital confirmed the development plans on 1 February 2019 for the shopping centre would now include an Olympic sized rink going forward. AMP's managing director, Mark Kirkland, said the company had listened to the community feedback and altered their plans after the outpouring of support to retain an Olympic sized facility.

On 2 February 2019, the NSW government, through NSW Environment Minister Gabrielle Upton, granted an interim order of heritage recognition to the Macquarie Ice Rink. The order recognises the rink as a place of significant cultural and recreational value. Any modification of the rink would have to be lodged with the NSW Heritage Council. The member for Ryde and Finance Minister Victor Dominello had sought the order to lock in the ice rink's future.

On 9 February 2020, the NSW Heritage Council confirmed it had removed the interim order and rejected the application by Victor Dominello for NSW heritage listing. The NSW Heritage Council said the rink was unlikely to be of state significance in its reasoning for rejecting the application. A spokesman for the Heritage Council noted the ice rink might be locally significant and should be considered for protection under the City of Ryde's local planning rules. AMP Capital's Mark Kirkland again confirmed any future developments of the centre would include an Olympic sized ice rink.

In 2025, Macquarie Ice Rink announced that they would go under renovations yet again on the 9th of June. This was later changed to an earlier date in May due to an unexpected early closure due to facility issues. This renovation included new pipes, new slabs, new seating, plexiglass walls surrounding the perimeter of the rink, a commentator box, penalty boxes, player boxes, upgrades to the audio and visual systems, and much more. The rink is expected to open yet again late October 2025.

== Facilities ==
Facilities at Macquarie Ice Rink are detailed below:

- 60 m × 30 m ice rink (Olympic sized - the only Olympic sized ice rink in Sydney)
- 2,000 seating capacity for spectators
- 15 square metre LCD screen
- Skate hire
- Café
- Gym
- Public toilets
- Disabled toilets
- Lift for wheelchair access
- Lockers (in limited numbers)
- Parking (including disabled parking) is available within the centre
- Medical centre located within the centre
- Jumbotron

== Events ==
The rink has offered private and public sessions every day for over 30 years. It provides professional coaches for private and group lessons in figure skating, ice hockey, speed skating, ice dance, and synchronised skating, as well as theatre on ice, disco nights, school sport and vacation care (holiday camps).

1991, Macquarie played host to the 1991 World Short Track Speed Skating Championships.

In 2000, Macquarie Ice Rink was the inaugural venue for the final of the newly created Australian Ice Hockey League. Adelaide Avalanche played Macquarie Bears in the final with the South Australians winning the match and the AIHL Championship 6–5 on a shootout.

From 2017 to early 2025, Macquarie Ice Rink, on an ongoing basis, plays host to Australian Ice Hockey League regular season matches between the months of April to August each year.

The rink is expected to reopen in late November 2025 to resume its normal events.

== See also ==
- List of ice rinks in Australia
- Sport in New South Wales
