= Wilson Cup =

The Wilson Cup may refer to:

- Wilson Cup (ice hockey), an ice hockey trophy awarded in New South Wales, Australia to the winner of a pre-season tournament;
- Wilson Cup (football), a football trophy awarded from 1906 until 1946 to a local team in Edinburgh, Scotland;
- Wilson Cup (basketball), awarded annually to the Ontario University Athletics league college basketball champion.
- George Wilson Cup, a competition open to reserve football teams affiliated to member clubs of the Irish League.
