= Blacktown Ice Arena =

Ice rink in Sydney, Australia

Blacktown international Ice Arena
- Blacktown Ice Arena
- Interactive map of Blacktown international Ice Arena
- Location: First Avenue, Blacktown; NSW 2148
- Coordinates: 33.768103°S 150.911206°E
- Owner: John Wilson
- Operator: Frank and Jean Hopkins
- Capacity: 500 (seating)

Construction
- Opened: May 1979 (47 years ago)
- Closed: 28 October 2007 (18 years ago)
- Demolished: 2007-2008
- Builder: Dick Groenteman and Warren Pittstock

Tenants
- Blacktown City Ice Hockey Club (1980-1984); Blacktown City Flyers (1981-2007); Blacktown Bullets (1993-1999); Warringah Bombers (1998-2007); Western Sydney Ice Dogs (2002–2007)

Website
- Blacktown Ice Arena

The Blacktown international Ice Arena (also known simply as Blacktown Ice Arena) was an ice sports and public skate centre, built in May 1979 the rink was located in Blacktown, Sydney, New South Wales, Australia. The rink closed on 28 October 2007 and was demolished over the course of 2007 and 2008. It had previously served as the home ice rink of the Blacktown Brewers Sydney Ice Dogs in the Australian Ice Hockey League between 2002 and 2007.

== History ==
Tom Breur opened the Blacktown International Ice Arena in Sydney's Western Suburbs in May 1979. Blacktown was Sydney's first ever suburban ice skating rink. The first organised ice hockey at the rink was with the re-located Glebe Lions when they played an all-star Sydney team. The Glebe Lions only stayed at the rink a few months before they were kicked out by Tom Breur for a minor incident. Rink owner John Wilson and Terry Jones set up a junior development ice hockey league in 1980. The Blacktown City Ice Hockey Club was established and affiliated with the NSW Ice Hockey Association. The Blacktown City Ice Hockey Club disbanded in 1984 due to financial issues and a number of other junior clubs were formed including the Vikings, Warriors, Wolves, Aliens and Flyers. In 1981, Steve Green founded the Blacktown Women's Ice Hockey team. It was the first NSW women's team since the 1920s. The team was a founded member of the NSW Women's Ice Hockey league (NSWWIHL). Also in 1981, the Blacktown City Flyers seniors were established and entered the New South Wales Superleague (NSWSL) as a foundation member. Following the closure of the Warringah Ice Skating Rink in the 1990s, NSWSL powerhouse, Warringah Bombers relocated to Blacktown. With the Bombers relocation, the rink withdrew its support for the Flyers and a semi-private owned team, the Blacktown Bullets, was founded and joined the league in place of the Flyers. The Blacktown Bullets won the Superleague Championship in its final season in 1999.

Following a two-year gap, top level ice hockey returned to Blacktown in 2002 with the formation of the Western Sydney Ice Dogs team based upon a core group of players and staff from the old Blacktown Bullets. John Wilson funded the new team. The Ice Dogs were granted an Australian Ice Hockey League franchise licence and the team entered the AIHL in 2002. The Ice Dogs remained at the venue in Blacktown until the rink's closure in 2007.

Blacktown Ice Arena closed its doors on 28 October 2007 and was slowly demolished over the remainder of 2007 into the start of 2008.

== Events ==
Between 2002 and 2007, the ice rink annually hosted regular season Australian Ice Hockey League matches involving the Sydney Ice Dogs (known then as Western Sydney Ice Dogs) between the months of April and August.

In 2002, the rink hosted the Australian Ice Hockey League Championship Final. The final in 2002 was the first AIHL final where the historic Goodall Cup was the prize. On Saturday 24 August, at 4:15pm, the Sydney Bears faced off with the Adelaide Avalanche in the final. The Sydney team finished the match Champions and were the first AIHL team to lift the Goodall Cup by defeating the South Australians 5–4 in a shootout.

== See also ==
- List of ice rinks in Australia
- Sport in New South Wales
