= Newcastle Northstars =

- City: Newcastle, NSW
- League: Australian Ice Hockey League
- Conference: Rurak
- Founded: 1977 (49 years ago)
- Operated: 1981–present
- Home arena: Hunter Ice Skating Stadium
- Colours: Royal blue, red, white
- Mascot: Marty the Moose
- General manager: (Australia) Garry Doré
- Head coach: (Canada) Kevin Noble
- Captain: (Australia) Liam Manwarring
- Affiliates: Newcastle Northstars Ice Hockey Club
- Website: northstars.theaihl.com

Franchise history
- 1977–1981: Newcastle Red Wings
- 1981–2017: Newcastle North Stars
- 2017–present: Newcastle Northstars

Championships
- Conference titles: 2 (2012, 2024)
- H Newman Reid Trophies: 6 (2004, 2009, 2010, 2012, 2015, 2026)
- Goodall Cups: 7 (2003, 2005, 2006, 2008, 2015, 2016), 2026)

The Newcastle Northstars (formally Newcastle North Stars) is an Australian semi-professional ice hockey team from Newcastle, New South Wales. The Northstars are a member of the Australian Ice Hockey League (AIHL), joining as an expansion team in 2002. The team is based at the Hunter Ice Skating Stadium in Warners Bay, a suburb of City of Lake Macquarie, 15 kilometres south-west of Newcastle. The Northstars are affiliated with the ice hockey club of the same name. The team have won seven Goodall Cups and six H Newman Reid Trophies, making them the most successful team in AIHL history.

== History ==
=== 1977–2001 (Pre-AIHL) ===
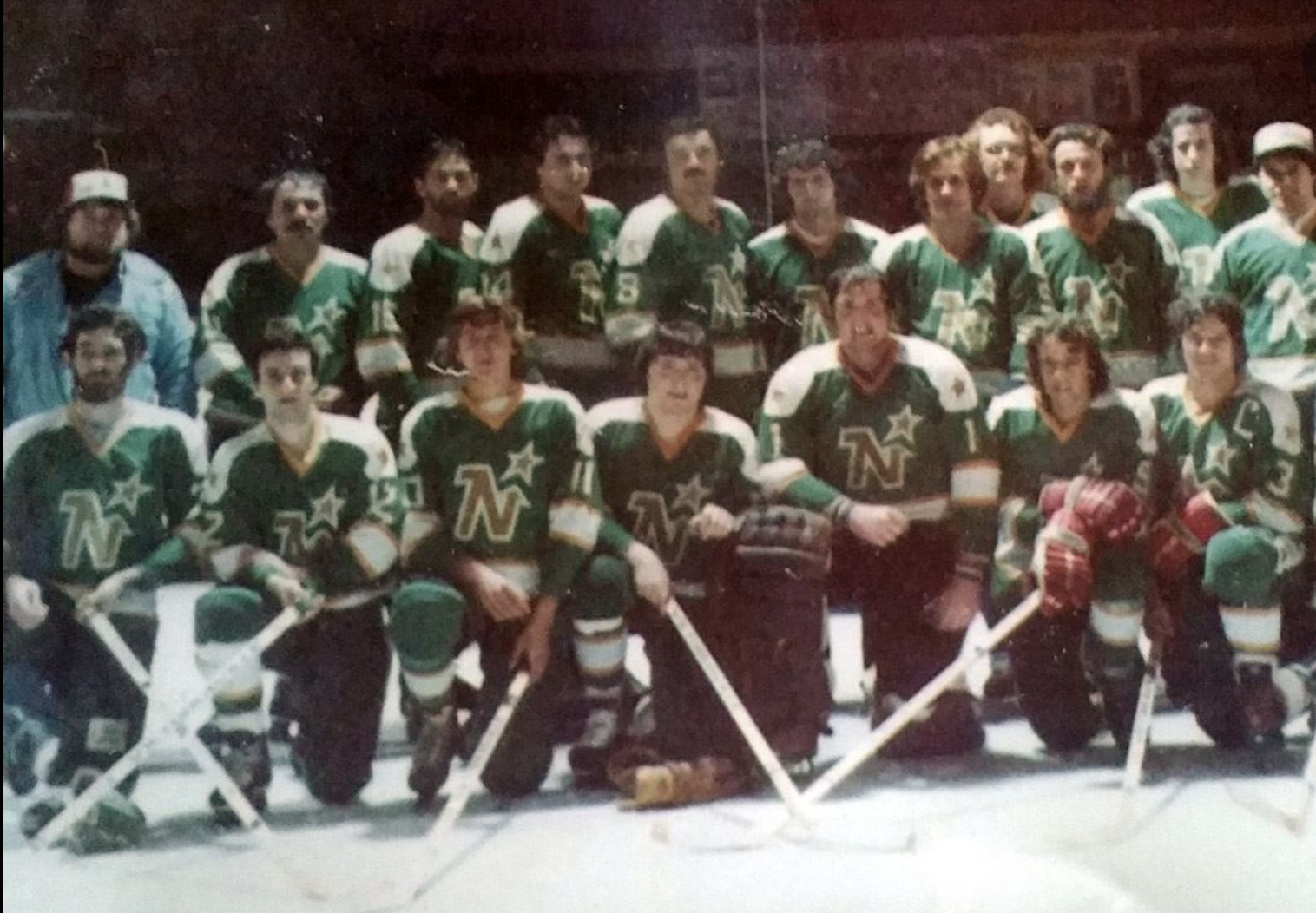
Team photo of Newcastle North Stars team from 1981 (courtesy David Turik)

Ice hockey started in the city of Newcastle in 1960 at the old boxing stadium where Marketown is now situated. Originally the Newcastle Red Wings, the Red Wings were part of national leagues of the time. Due to instability there were several variations of these leagues. The Red Wings became the North Stars in 1978 and were leading the national 'Super League' at the time when the Newcastle ice rink went into liquidation in late 1982. Some players then retired, while others went on to play for teams in Sydney or join inline hockey teams that started in the 1990s in Newcastle. A Newcastle North Stars in-line hockey team was formed including former members of the defunct Wharf Road team.

In 2000 the Hunter Ice Skating Stadium (a.k.a. HISS) opened at 230 Macquarie Road, Warners Bay. The Lake Macquarie suburb, only 15 km from the city, proved an ideal location for the new rink. The rink opened with former North Stars player/coach Garry Doré as general manager.

A local committee was established and the Newcastle Northstars Ice Hockey Club was registered in 2001. The team mostly consisted of Canadian expatriates along with four talented local-born players contested the New South Wales Senior B championship. The Senior B North Stars went on to win the state Senior B Championship for 2001.

Later in 2001 the Hunter Ice Skating Stadium hosted the Goodall Cup tournament. The Goodall Cup is Australia's senior men's national tournament, contested since 1909. Utilising the experience from running the tournament and gaining assistance from existing AIHL teams, rink general manager Garry Doré began building a team ready for the Australian Ice Hockey League. Canadian expatriate Don Champagne was recruited to be coach, and local hockey enthusiast Peter Lambert was recruited as Team Manager.

=== 2002–2006 ===
The Newcastle Northstars entered the Australian Ice Hockey League (AIHL) as the North Stars in 2002. They were a part of the league's expansion that saw the league double in size from three teams to six. The Northstars joined the league along with the Melbourne Ice and Western Sydney Ice Dogs.

Don Champagne was appointed the inaugural Northstars AIHL head coach while Bill Jones was named foundation captain. Due to a lack of local talent in the first season, the league allowed the Northstars to find players in Sydney and evenly split their roster between locals and imports. Newcastle assembled a roster for 2002 with nine Canadians expats and eight locals.

The 2002 season produced highs and lows for the Novocastrians. Newcastle's first ever match in the AIHL was at home at the Hunter Ice Skating Stadium on 4 May 2002 against the Western Sydney Ice Dogs. The Northstars lost the match 3–7. Newcastle's first AIHL victory and shutout came on 19 May 2002 when they defeated the Canberra Knights 4–0. The Northstars finished the season in fourth place with six wins and ten losses. Canadian forward, Brett Hillier, finished the season as the Northstars top points scorers with 34 points.

In 2003, Newcastle appointed their first coaching director. Former Denmark and Canadian national team coach, Rob Barnes was appointed to the position by the Northstars. Barnes made an immediate impact in Newcastle with the Northstars finishing second in the league table in the 2003 season. The Northstars then won their very first AIHL era trophy in 2003. The Novocastrians defeated the Ice Dogs 4–1 in the AIHL final to claim the Goodall Cup.

The Northstars backed up this success in 2004 by finishing top of the league table having only lost one match all season and claimed the team's first premiership and V.I.P. Cup. Success continued in 2005 and 2006 with the Northstars claiming back-to-back Goodall Cups with victories over rivals Adelaide Avalanche in the final in both seasons.

=== 2007–2016 ===
The decade between 2007 and 2016 saw the Northstars continue their strong position within the league, establishing a winning tradition within the team culture. Newcastle throughout this period of time, claimed league premiers and the H Newman Reid Trophy, four times by finishing top of the league standings in 2009, 2010, 2012 and 2015. The team reached the Goodall Cup final eight times, claiming three Goodall Cups in 2008, 2015 and 2016. The Northstars also found success for the first time in the NSW Wilson Cup, lifting the trophy in 2015. The Northstars set a few team records in 2015 with their highest ever points total in a season (63), highest goals scored in a season (152) and highest goals difference (+69). Canadian import, Geordie Wudrick also set league records for highest points in a season, 91 points at a rate of 3.25 per game and most goals in a season, 44 goals. At the conclusion of the 2016 season, for the time, the team had become the most successful franchise in AIHL history.

=== 2017–present ===
April 2017, prior to the start of the 2017 season, the team announced a minor change to their name. They changed their name from the North Stars to the Northstars. The re-brand was completed to align to the team with the New South Wales registered club, the Newcastle Northstars Ice Hockey Club.

2017 marked a shift in fortunes for the team. After only missing out on finals twice in the previous fifteen years, the Northstars not only failed to qualify for finals but finished their lowest ever position in the league, seventh. Ten wins from twenty eight matches with a negative twenty seven goal difference did not make for good reading. Head coach, Andrew Petrie, decided to step down from his position at the conclusion of the season.

2018 saw an improvement in the Northstars with thirteen wins in the season and a fifth-place finish under the leadership of stand-in coaching trio, Joey Theriault, Ray Sheffield and Garry Doré. However, it was still not good enough to see them qualify for the finals weekend in Melbourne and for the first time in the team's history they failed to qualify for finals back-to-back.

2019, the Northstars hired a new head coach in former Northstars player, John Kennedy Jnr. This was the American Aussie's first head coaching positioning since retiring as a player. The team recruited well with a number of quality imports joining from overseas. Leading the way for the team in 2019 was Canadian import Sammy Banga who finished third top points scorer in the league with sixty-six points. The Northstars saw great improvement over the previous two seasons under the guidance of John Kennedy. They finished the season runners-up in the league standings and qualified for the finals which were played in Newcastle for the first time in seven years. Unfortunately for the Northstars, they were defeated 2-3 by the Perth Thunder in the semi-finals in front of a boisterous home crowd.

== Season-by-season results ==
Newcastle Northstars all-time record
Season	Regular season											Finals									Wilson Cup	Top points scorer
Season	P	W	T	L	OW	OL	GF	GA	GD	Pts	Finish	P	W	L	GF	GA	Result	Preliminary Final	Semi Final	Goodall Cup Final	Wilson Cup	Name	Points
2002	20	6	–	14	–	–	79	121	-42	12	4th	–									–	(Canada) Brett Hillier	34
2003^{1}	20	14	–	6	–	–	107	79	+28	30	2nd	2	2	–	11	5	Champion	–	Won 7-4 (Bears)	Won 4-1 (Ice Dogs)	–	(Ukraine) Pavel Shtefan	19
2004	20	15	2	1	2	–	93	50	+43	51	1st	2	1	1	4	5	Runner-up	–	Won 3-2 (2OT) (Avalanche)	Lost 1-3 (Ice Dogs)	–	(Canada) Sean Starke	38
2005	26	14	2	5	1	4	121	80	+41	50	2nd	2	2	–	8	3	Champion	–	Won 5-2 (Ice Dogs)	Won 3-1 (Avalanche)	–	(Canada) Francis Walker	54
2006	28	16	–	11	–	1	138	89	+49	49	4th	2	2	–	10	1	Champion	–	Won 6-1 (Ice)	Won 4-0 (Avalanche)	–	(Netherlands) Marcel Kars	66
2007	28	13	–	6	4	5	106	87	+19	52	3rd	2	1	1	8	6	Runner-up	–	Won 6-3 (Ice)	Lost 2-3 (OT) (Bears)	Group	(Canada) Brad Wanchulak	69
2008	28	15	–	7	2	4	150	97	+53	53	4th	2	2	–	11	6	Champion	–	Won 7-5 (Bears)	Won 4-1 (Ice Dogs)	Group	(Canada) Mickey Gilchrist	67
2009	24	17	–	5	2	–	122	85	+37	55	1st	2	1	1	7	6	Runner-up	–	Won 5-3 (Blue Tongues)	Lost 2-3 (OT) (Adrenaline)	Group	(Canada) Éric Lafrenière	56
2010	24	14	–	2	7	1	131	74	+57	57	1st	1	–	1	6	7	Semi-finalist	–	Lost 6-7 (Adrenaline)	–	–	(United States) Brian Bales	81
2011	28	18	–	6	1	3	132	106	+26	59	2nd	2	1	1	7	5	Runner-up	–	Won 5-2 (Ice Dogs)	Lost 2-3 (Ice)	–	(United States) Peter Cartwright	75
2012	24	16	–	6	2	–	120	78	+42	52	1st	2	1	1	8	8	Runner-up	–	Won 5-4 (Adrenaline)	Lost 3-4 (Ice)	–	(Canada) Jeremy Boyer	58
2013	28	17	–	7	3	1	132	75	+57	58	2nd	2	1	1	9	7	Runner-up	–	Won 6-1 (Thunder)	Lost 3-6 (Ice Dogs)	–	(Canada) Jeff Martens	67
2014	28	11	–	15	–	2	87	106	-19	35	6th	–									Runner-up	(Canada) Chris Wilson	49
2015	28	19	–	4	1	4	152	83	+69	63	1st	2	2	–	7	5	Champion	–	Won 4-3 (Brave)	Won 3-2 (Ice)	Winner	(Canada) Geordie Wudrick	91
2016	28	15	–	7	1	5	105	74	+31	52	3rd	2	2	–	5	3	Champion	–	Won 3-2 (OT) (Thunder)	Won 3-2 (Brave)	Group	(United States) Connor McLaughlin	61
2017	28	7	–	15	3	3	97	124	-27	30	7th	–									–	(Canada) Joe Harcharik	44
2018	28	9	–	11	4	4	106	119	-13	39	5th	–									–	(Canada) Joe Harcharik	37
2019	28	16	–	9	3	0	127	89	+38	54	2nd	1	0	1	2	3	Semi-finalist	–	Lost 2-3 (Thunder)	–	–	(Canada) Sammy Banga	66
2020	2020 and 2021 AIHL seasons were cancelled and not contested
2021	2020 and 2021 AIHL seasons were cancelled and not contested
2022	20	15	–	3	–	2	112	74	+38	47	2nd	3	1	2	7	12	Runner-up	Lost 1-6 (Brave)	Won 4-3 (OT) (Bears)^{2}	Lost 2-3 (Brave)	–	(Canada) Francis Drolet	45
2023	26	18	–	7	1	–	162	112	+50	56	3rd	1	0	1	1	4	Prelim-finalist	Lost 1-4 (Thunder)	–	–	–	(Canada) Daniel Berno	58
2024	30	13	–	7	3	7	124	108	+16	52	4th	1	0	1	3	4	Semi-finalist	–	Lost 3-4 (Ice)	–	–	(Canada) Francis Drolet	62
2025	28	13	–	12	3	–	150	125	+25	45	4th	2	1	1	10	7	Semi-finalist	Won 6-1 (Lightning)	Lost 4-6 (Ice)	–	–	(Romania) Yevgeni Skachkov	61
2026	–	–	–	–	–	–	–	–	–	–	–	–	–	–	–	–	–	–	–	–	–	–	–
Totals	570	311	4	166	43	46	2653	2035	+618			33	20	13	124	97

^{1} 2003 AIHL season statistics are unofficial. The AIHL has not published official statistics on www.theaihl.com. Data has been collected from web archives of the Newcastle Northstars and Ice Hockey Australia game reports.
^{2} In 2022, the preliminary Final was the second game of the Finals format rather than the first, as it was in following seasons. The Northstars qualified for the preliminary-final after losing the major semi-final and played the winner of the minor semi-final for a spot in the grand final.

Champions	Runners-up	Third place

== Championships ==
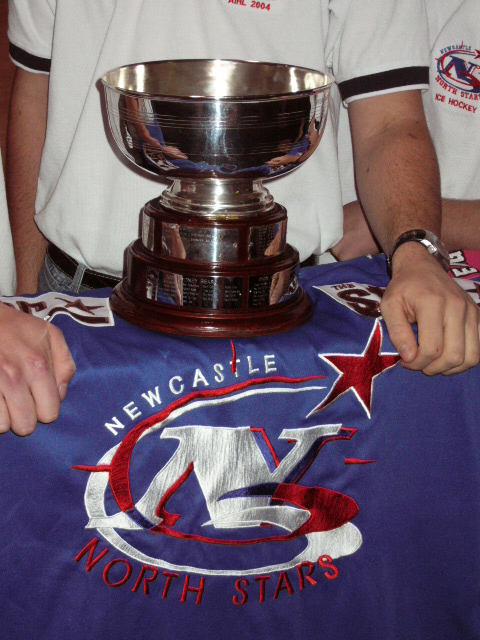
The Goodall Cup on top of the then champions, Newcastle Northstars, sweater ahead of the 2004 AIHL Finals weekend

- Goodall Cup

(gold) Champions (6): 2003, 2005, 2006, 2008, 2015, 2016, 2026
(silver) Runners-Up (7): 2004, 2007, 2009, 2011, 2012, 2013, 2022

- H Newman Reid Trophy (2008-Current)

(gold) Premiers (4): 2009, 2010, 2012, 2015
(silver) Runners-Up (4): 2011, 2013, 2019, 2022

- V.I.P. Cup (2004–07)^{*}

(gold) Premiers (1): 2004
(silver) Runners-Up (2): 2003, 2005

- Wilson Cup

(gold) Winners (1): 2015
(silver) Runners-Up (1): 2014

- Rurak Conference

(gold) Winners (1): 2024
(silver) Runners-Up (1): 2023

- Bauer Conference

(gold) Winners (1): 2012

^{*} This list also includes Premierships prior to the first trophy, V.I.P. Cup, for Premiers in 2004.

== Players ==
=== Current roster ===
Team roster for the 2026 AIHL season.

Newcastle Northstars roster - 2026 AIHL season
Active roster		Coaching staff
Goaltenders: 32 (Australia) Matúš Trnka; 75 (United States) Matthew Montgomery; 98 (Australia) Ethan Spelde; Defencemen: 2 (Australia) Brian Funes; 5 (Australia) Dylan Penhall; 6 (Japan) Akihide Watanabe (I); 7 (Australia) Riley Tonks; 10 (France) Aziz Baazzi (I); 18 (Australia) Arki Hearn; 44 (Australia) Calvin Bright; 77 (Australia) Ethan Hawes	Forwards: 8 (Australia) Jayden Ryan; 9 (Australia) Wehebe Darge; 11 (Australia) Tim Stanger; 12 (Canada) Riley Klugerman; 14 (Australia) Thomas Garas; 15 (Australia) Beau Taylor; 17 (Canada) Francis Drolet (A/I); 20 (Finland) Santeri Haarala (I); 22 (Australia) Taj Lowrey; 23 (Australia) Maliq West; 24 (Canada) Liam Ryan; 25 (Romania) Evgeny Skachkov (I); 27 (Australia) Liam Manwarring (C); 66 (Tunisia) Adrien Sebag (I); 71 (Australia) Shane Southwood; 86 (Australia) Mackenzie Gallagher; 91 (Australia) Patrick Nadin (A); 96 (Australia) Hunter Ellen; 97 (Canada) Hayden Klugerman	Head Coach: (Canada) Kevin Noble; Coaches: (Australia) Amelia Matheson (AC); (Australia) Jackson Rickford (EM); (Australia) Troy Lowrey (TR); (Australia) Ashley Guthrie (MD); Legend (C) Captain (A) Alternate Captain (I) Import player Statistics; Average age: 27.47; Average height: 182.25 cm Average weight: 80.75 kg Locals: 24; Imports: 6
Last updated on: 18 July 2026
Elite Prospects IHNA

=== Important rosters ===
Newcastle Northstars inaugural 2002 AIHL roster
Locals
(Australia) Adam McGuinness	(Australia) Aaron Dodds	(Australia) Elliot Mann	(Australia) Jamie Roach
(Australia) Rob Duchemin	(Australia) Nigel Chandler	(Australia) Matt Lerch	(Australia) Blake Powell
(Australia) Mike Leger	(Australia) Jeff Byrne	(Australia) Fred Stevenson	(Australia) Nick Windle (G)
(Australia) Ken Kozak (G)	(Australia) Chris Kelly (G)	(Australia) Rick West	(Australia) Blake Powell
Imports
(Canada) Bill Jones	(Canada) Michael Schlamp	(Canada) Brett Hillier	(Canada) Cody Crawford
(Canada) Justin Way	(Romania) Gicu Oprea	(Canada) Rob Spiers	(Canada) Ryan Braaksma
(Canada) Sean Gurniak	(Canada) Ray Sheffield	(Canada) Andrew Ogilvie
Coaching staff
(Australia) Don Champagne (Head coach)		(Australia) Garry Doré (General Manager)

Newcastle Northstars 2015 Goodall Cup championship roster
Goaltenders
(Canada) #30 Davis	(Australia) #31 Quinton-Jones	(Australia) #33 Broekman
Defencemen
(Australia) #3 Lindsay	(Australia) #4 Starke	(Australia) #5 Kennedy	(Australia) #7 Cole-Clark
(Australia) #16 Chalker	(Australia) #23 Wetini	(Czech Republic) #24 Safar	(Australia) #25 Ferrari
Forwards
(Australia) #8 Powell	(Canada) #12 Swiston (A)	(Australia) #15 Taylor	(Australia) #20 Malloy
(United States) #27 Moffatt	(Australia) #42 Bales	(Australia) #58 Sheard	(Australia) #71 Southwood
(Canada) #88 Wudrick	(Australia) #91 Nadin
Coaching staff
(Australia) Andrew Petrie (Head coach)		(Canada) Joey Theriault (Assistant)

=== Player records ===
The following are the top five all-time leaders in five different statistical categories: matches played; goals; assists; points; penalty minutes

As of 2024 season

All-time Appearances
#	Name	Pos	GP
1	(Australia) Mat Lindsay	D	273
2	(Australia) Robert Starke	D	267
3	(Australia) Tim Stanger	F	259
4	(Australia) Ray Sheffield	F	250
5	(Australia) Hamish Powell	F	244

All-time Goals
#	Name	Pos	G
1	(Australia) Brian Bales	F	101
2	(Australia) Beau Taylor	F	90
3	(Canada) Francis Drolet	F	82
4	(United States) Peter Cartwright	F	72
5	(Canada) Daniel Berno	D	67

All-time Assists
#	Name	Pos	A
1	(Australia) Robert Starke	D	242
2	(Australia) Brian Bales	F	141
3	(Canada) Francis Drolet	F	132
4	(Australia) Robert Malloy	F	117
5	(Australia) Beau Taylor	F	109

All-time Points
#	Name	Pos	Pts
1	(Australia) Robert Starke	D	300
2	(Australia) Brian Bales	F	242
3	(Canada) Francis Drolet	F	214
4	(Australia) Beau Taylor	F	199
5	(Australia) Robert Malloy	F	166

All-time Penalties
#	Name	Pos	PIM
1	(Australia) Sean Oultram	D	479
2	(Australia) David Ferrari	D	454
3	(Australia) Robert Starke	D	437
4	(Australia) Hamish Powell	D	417
5	(Australia) John Kennedy	D	328

== Staff ==
Staff roster for the 2024 AIHL season

Northstars staff
Role	Name
Head coach	(Canada) Kevin Noble
Assistant coach	(Australia) Amelia Matheson
Assistant coach	(Australia) David Ferrari
Coach	(Australia) Ray Sheffield
Trainer	(Australia) Josh Secomb
Team manager	(Australia) Craig Tonks
Medic	(Australia) Bruce Hounslow
Medic	(Australia) Justin Cudmore
General manager	(Australia) Garry Doré
Governor	(Australia) Garry Doré

== Team identity ==
=== Rivalries ===
==== Sydney Ice Dogs ====
The Proski Newcastle North Stars' primary rivals are the Sydney Ice Dogs (Formally West Sydney Ice Dogs). The first ever AIHL game for the Proski North Stars was a loss to the Ice Dogs, who joined the league in 2002 along with the North Stars. The two teams have a rich history in the AIHL Finals of facing off in big matches in pursuit of the Goodall Cup. The North Stars defeated the Ice Dogs in the 2003 and 2008 finals to win the Goodall Cup (both by a margin of 4–1). The North Stars lost the Cup to the Ice Dogs in the 2004 final, while also defeating the Ice Dogs in the semi-final in 2005.

==== Adelaide ====
The Northstars developed a healthy competitive rivalry with Adelaide franchises, the Adelaide Avalanche and Adelaide Adrenaline. The Northstars and Adelaide face each other in finals matches with both teams sharing in the winning at different times.

The Northstars and Avalanche met in the Goodall Cup deciders in 2005 and 2006. In 2005, the two teams fought for the regular season title with the Avalanche finishing first but the Northstars used their home crowd advantage in the final to secure a 3–1 victory. In 2006, the Northstars only snuck into the finals by finishing fourth but in the finals the dominated the Melbourne Ice in the semi's before meeting the Avalanche in the final. The Northstars played the perfect match, shutting out Adelaide and securing the cup with a 4–0 victory.

In 2009 the North Stars were defeated by the Adrenaline in overtime in the Goodall Cup final, 3–2 in overtime. In 2010 the Adrenaline knocked out the Northstars in the semi-final, holding off a third period comeback by the Northstars to win 7–6.

==== CBR Brave ====
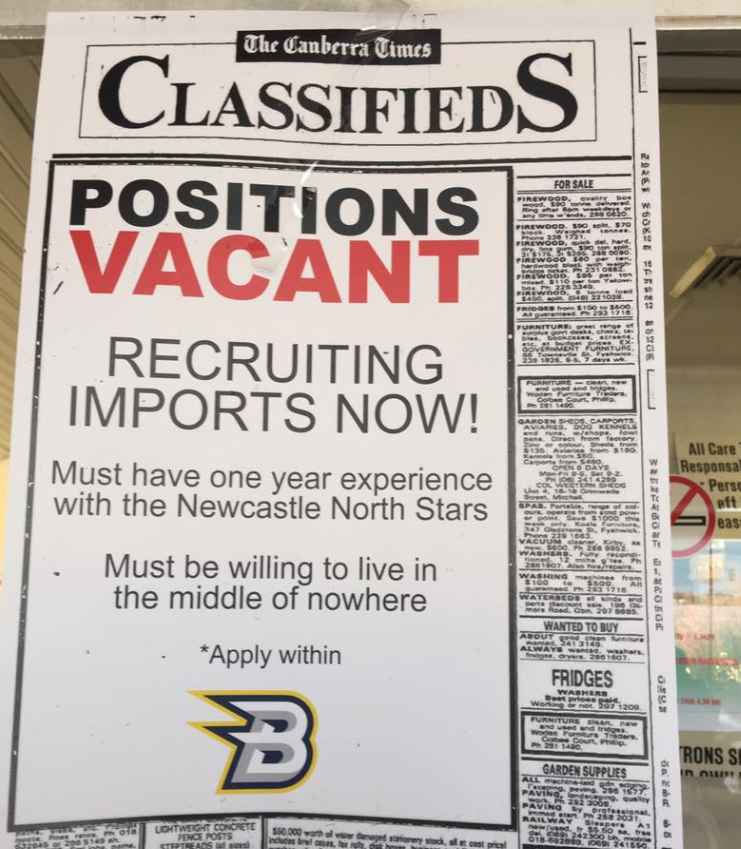
Fan made poster

Since the induction of the CBR Brave into the AIHL in 2014, the Northstars have built a heated rivalry with the team from Canberra. The two sides have fought each other for league titles, faced-off in hotly contested finals matches, seen players and coaches switch teams and seen a player's career ended. Both sets of fans have a history of banter with walk out music, placards and clothing being used to ramp up the rivalry.

In the 2015 AIHL semi-finals the two teams met in Melbourne. The Brave took a 3–0 lead thanks to two short-handed goals deep into the second period. The Northstars then kicked into life and fought back to win the match 4-3 thanks to a third period hat trick to league MVP Geordie Wudrick.

The Brave then ‘poached’ Wudrick and Jan Safar for the 2016 season, causing a massive stir around the league. Northstar's head coach, Andrew Petrie, took the issue up with the local media and labelled the Brave disrespectful and a team trying to buy the league title. He also went on to label the city of Canberra a place ‘in the middle of nowhere’.

The four 2016 regular season matches saw the two teams rack up 178 penalty minutes and end Brave import Art Bidlevskii's career. The defenceman was accidentally struck in the throat. The two teams met in the AIHL final with the Northstars triumphing over the Brave 2–1 to clinch their sixth Goodall Cup.

In 2017, Newcastle legend, Rob Starke switched to the Brave to take up the head coaching position following his playing retirement. He took with him another long-time Northstars favourite, Brian Bales.

In 2019, the two teams fought for the H Newman Reid trophy for finishing premiers on top of the regular season table. The Northstars and Brave were one and two for much of the season but in the end the Brave claimed the trophy and the Northstars finished second.

=== Honoured members ===
==== Accolades ====
The Newcastle Northstars have been recognised by the Newcastle City Council as Newcastle's most outstanding senior sports team on three occasions in 2003, 2004 and 2006. They were also a finalist in 2008.

North Stars goalie Matt Ezzy was voted "Sportsperson of the Year" by the Lake Macquarie City Council for his 2005 season in February 2006, and was a finalist for the same award in 2007. North Stars defenceman and assistant captain Rob Starke was also a finalist for Senior Sportsperson of the year, 2007.

North Stars coach Don Champagne was voted "Sports Official of the Year 2010" at the 2011 Newcastle City Sports Awards.

==== S.M. Hudson Trophy ====
The Hudson Trophy is awarded by Ice Hockey Australia for sportsman of the year. It was first awarded in 1964 and is open for nominations by Australian ice hockey organisations and teams. Glenn Foll, who captained the Australian national team between 1990 and 2006, is the only player who has played for the Northstars and won the Hudson Trophy. Foll played for Newcastle during the 2005 AIHL season. He won the award in 2003 while playing for rivals Adelaide Avalanche.

==== Retired numbers ====
Throughout the history of the Newcastle Northstars, three jersey numbers have been retired in honour of former club legends. The retired jersey number banners hang on the player's bench side of the Hunter Ice Skating Stadium.

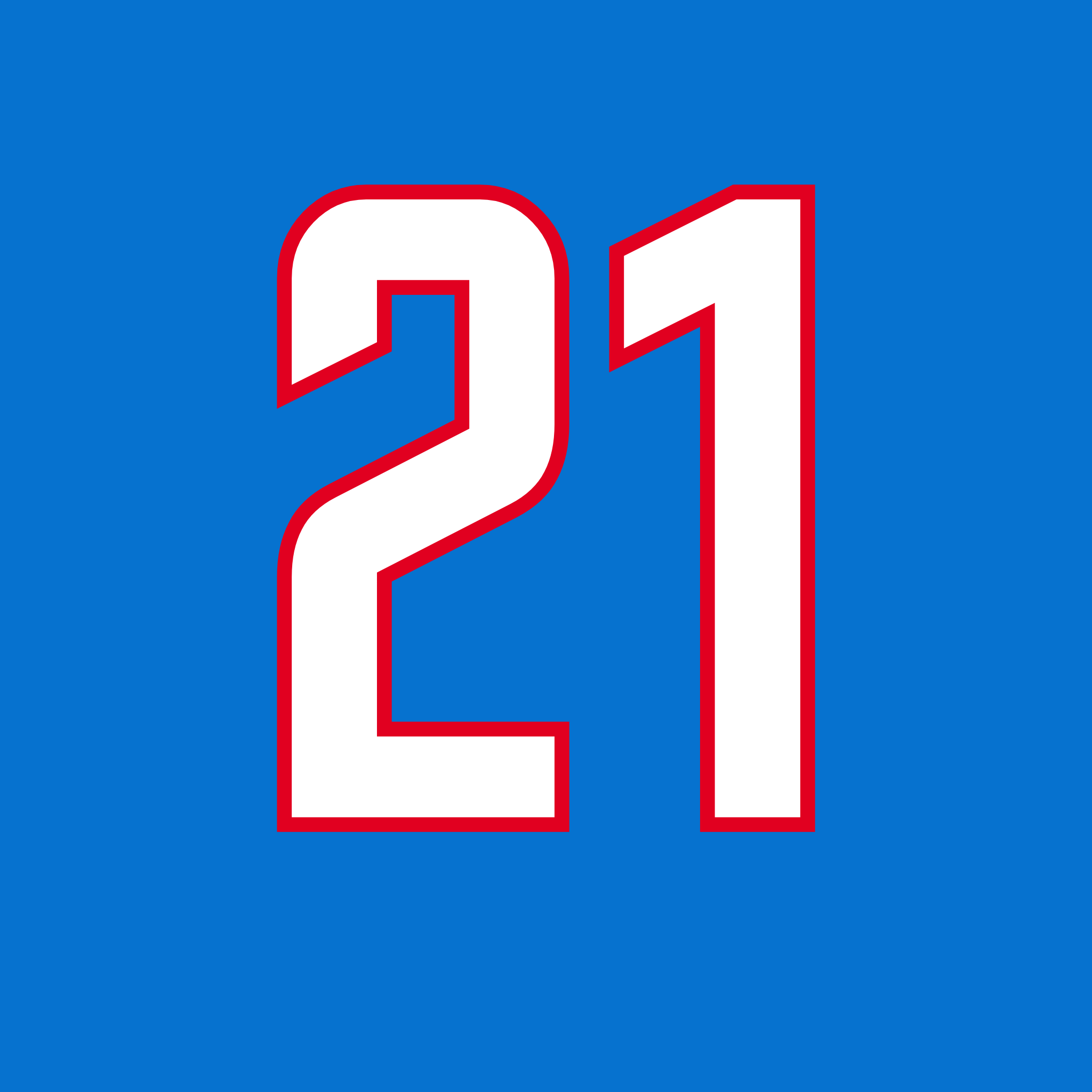
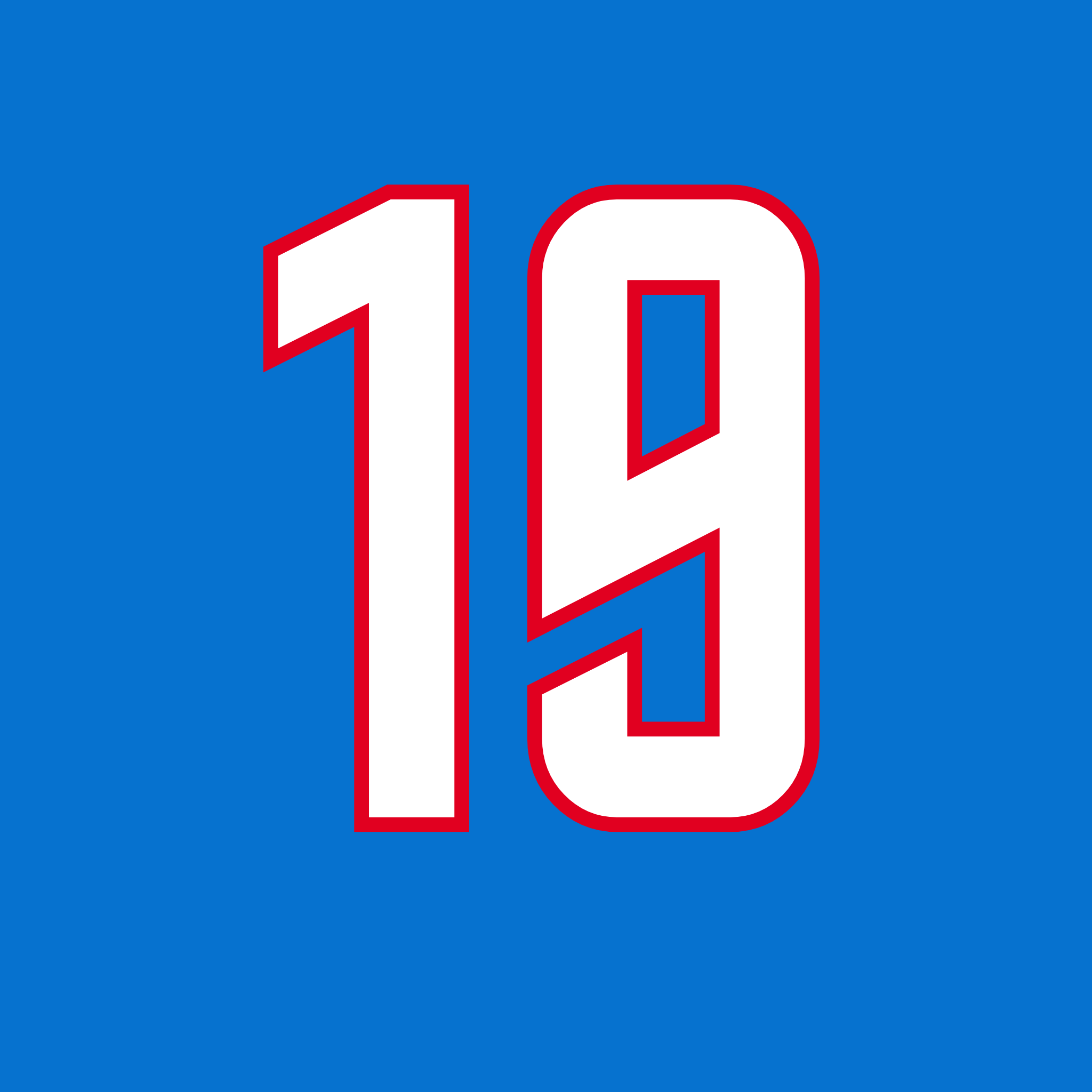
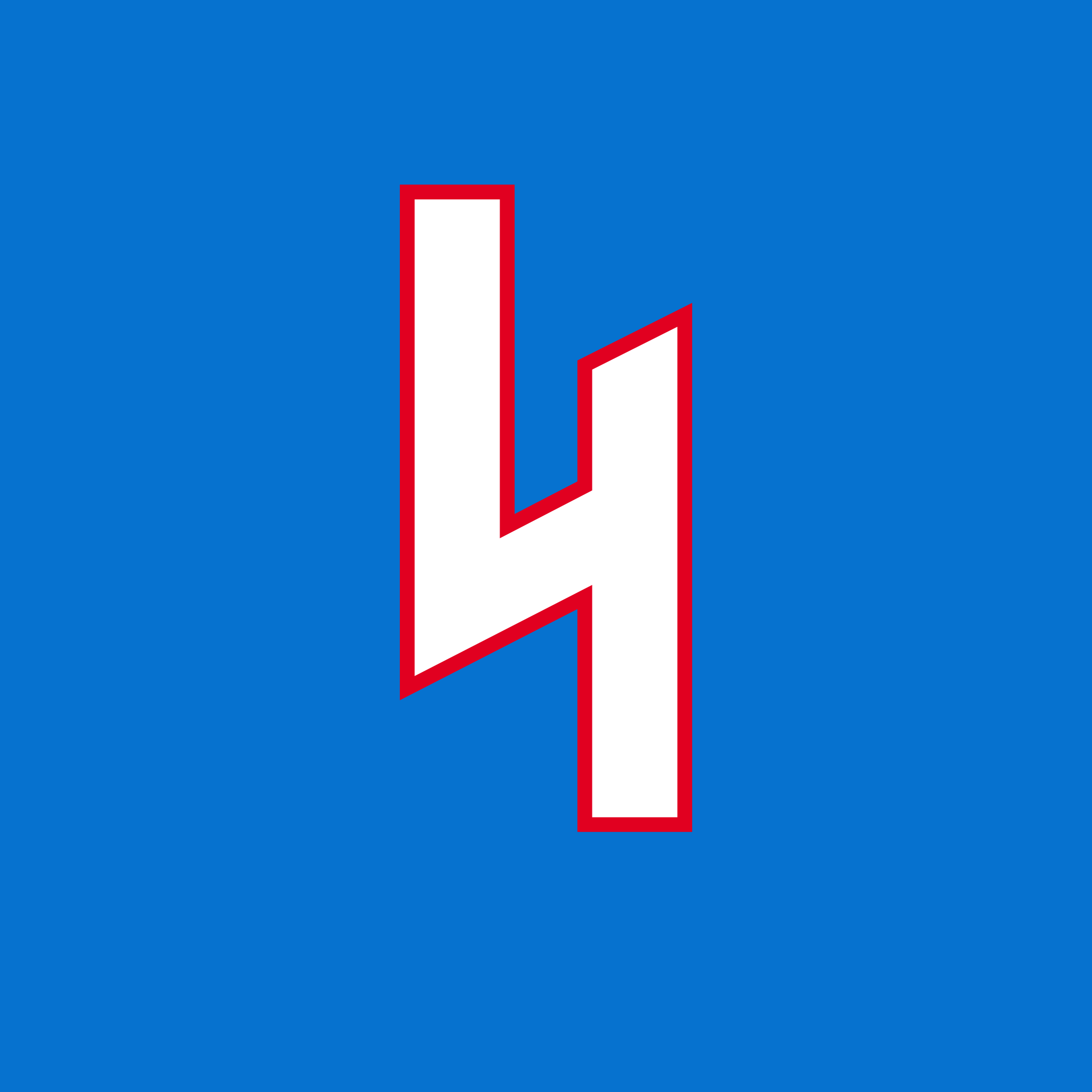
Retired number	History
	(Australia) Terry George – # 21 (1980-1981, Defenseman); Terry was a foundation player for the Northstars when they changed identity from the Red Wings and joined the newly established New South Wales Superleague. The Northstars were leading the league when the rink went into liquidation forcing the team to pull out of the league and for the players to either retire or find Sydney teams to join. Terry continued to give back to Newcastle and was a long-time volunteer at the Northstars. Terry George died of cancer in the late 1990s and the Northstars honoured him by retiring his number 21 jersey and creating a shield in his name that is given annually to a club-member who exemplifies in the role of volunteer.
	(Australia) Ray Sheffield – # 19 (2002-2014, Forward); Ray was an inaugural member of the Northstars team that entered the AIHL in 2002. He became captain of the team in 2003 and led the Northstars to their first national championship that year. Sheffield went on to become the Newcastle’s and the league’s longest running captain during his thirteen year, 292 match, career at the Northstars. Ray won four Goodall Cups as a player for Newcastle before winning a fifth as assistant coach of the team in 2016. Sheffield was honoured with the retirement of his number 19 jersey at a pre-match ceremony in May 2015.
	(Australia) Robert Starke – # 4 (2004-2015, Defenseman); Canadian born Robert ‘Rob’ Starke was a key member of the player leadership group throughout his time at the Northstars. He captained the team during two seasons and won four Goodall Cups and H Newman Reid Trophies. When he retired, Rob held the record for highest scoring defenseman in the AIHL as well as Northstars records for most assists and points. The Northstars held a ceremony in June 2016 to retire Rob’s number 4 jersey.

==== Club award winners ====
Since 2003, each season the Northstars hold an annual awards night to present that season's team awards. There are six awards given out at the awards nights including most valuable player, best defensive player, most improved player, most dedicated player, Tony Huntley Award for best Australian player and the coach's award.

Season	MVP	BDP	MIP	MDP	THA	CA
2003	Daryl Bat	Trevor Battaglia	Fred Stevenson	Andrew Ogilvie & Mike Blackwell	-	Rick West
2008	Mickey Gilchrist & Colin Nicholson	Robert Starke	Matt Price	Matthew Vaughan	Casey Minson	B.J. Pelkey
2009	-	-	-	-	-	-
2010	-	-	-	-	-	-
2011	Peter Cartwright	Scott Thauwald	Tim Stanger	Matt Ezzy	Matt Price	Robert Starke
2012	Olivier Martin	-	-	-	-	-
2013	Olivier Martin	John Kennedy	Jayson Chalker	Adam Geric	Beau Taylor	Pier-Olivier Cotnoir
2014	John Kennedy	Robert Starke	Matt Wetini	Ray Sheffield	Matt Wetini	Joey Theriault
2015	Geordie Wudrick	Dayne Davis	Jayson Chalker	Robert Starke	Mathew Lindsay	Robert Malloy
2016	Connor McLaughlin	John Kennedy	Patrick Nadin	Dayne Davis & Robert Malloy	Mathew Lindsay	Matt Wetini
2017	Joe Harcharik	Robert Malloy	Liam Manwarring	Charlie Smart	Mathew Lindsay	David Ferrari
2018	Nick Rivait	Nick Rivait	Shane Southwood	Robert Malloy	Patrick Nadin	Joe Harcharik
2019	Sammy Banga	Dayne Davis	Richard Tesarik	Robert Malloy	Charlie Smart	Josh Secomb
2022	Francis Drolet	Ethan Hawes	Mackenzie Gallagher	Paddy Ward	Liam Manwarring	Tim Stanger
2023	Francis Drolet	Tanner Butler	Riley Klugerman	Charlie Smart	Wehebe Darge	Daniel Berno
2024	Francis Drolet	Alexander Yuill	Hunter Ellen	Drew Robson	Ethan Hawes	Daniel Berno

== Team leaders ==
=== Team captains ===
The Northstars have had five different captains in the team's known history.

No.	Name	Term
1	(Canada) Bill Jones	2002
2	(Australia) Ray Sheffield	2003–09
3	(Australia) Robert Starke	2010
4	(Australia) Ray Sheffield	2011–13
5	(Australia) Robert Starke	2014
6	(Australia) Robert Malloy	2015–21
7	(Australia) Liam Manwarring	2022–Present

=== Head coaches ===
The Northstars have had five different head coaches in the team's history. In 2018, the Northstars had no head coach, instead the team chose a new coaching structure of three associate coaches to share the coaching responsibilities. Joey Theriault, Ray Sheffield and Garry Doré took up these roles in 2018.

No.	Name	Term
1	(Australia) Don Champagne	2000–11
2	(Australia) Garry Doré	2012–14
3	(Australia) Andrew Petrie	2015–17
4	(Australia) John Kennedy (player-coach)	2019
5	(Canada) Kevin Noble	2022–Present

=== General managers ===
The Northstars have had one general manager (GM) in the team's history.

No.	Name	Term
1	(Australia) Garry Doré	2002–Present

=== Team managers ===
The Northstars have had seven different team managers in the team's history.

No.	Name	Term
1	(Australia) Peter Lambert	2002
2	(Australia) Peter Antcliff	2003
3	(Australia) Peter Lambert	2004
4	(Australia) Tony Johnston	2005–06
5	(Australia) Christian Martin	2007–08
6	(Australia) Marcus Chapman	2009–12
7	(Australia) Christian Martin	2013–15
8	(Australia) Don Champagne	2016–18
9	(Australia) Craig Tonks	2016–Present

=== Coaching directors ===
The Northstars have had one coaching director in the team's history.

No.	Name	Term
1	(Canada) Rob Barnes	2003–09

== Broadcasting ==
Current:

- AIHL.TV (2023–present) – Worldwide paid subscription-based online video broadcasting published by the AIHL in partnership with the Clutch.TV platform using local production companies at each team’s rink. The service went live in April 2023, and would cover every AIHL regular season and finals games live and on demand.
- Sportradar (2022–present) – International online video broadcasting in North America and Europe as part of a league-wide 3-year deal signed in March 2022 in the lead up to the 2022 AIHL season.

Former:

- Kayo Sports (2022) – Domestic online video broadcasting in Australia as part of the league wide deal struck in the lead up to the 2022 AIHL season to show every AIHL game live.
- Fox Sports (2013–19) – Part of the entire AIHL domestic TV broadcasting deal with Fox Sports to show one game a round, normally on Thursday's at 4:30 pm or after NHL games during NHL season.

== Northstars trivia ==
Trivia that relates to the Newcastle Northstars club or current and past players of the Northstars.

- The North Stars set an AIHL record for most goals scored in a game by one team – and also for the greatest winning margin in a game – when they defeated the Canberra Knights by a score of 21–2 at the HISS on 6 August 2006. Centre Marcel Kars recorded 8 goals and 4 assists in the game.
- Goaltender Ken Kozak played for the North Stars in 2002. He was in goal for the Australian national team when they defeated New Zealand 58–0 in Perth in 1987, a world record score for an international ice hockey game.
