= 2013 AIHL season =

- League: Australian Ice Hockey League
- Sport: Ice hockey
- Duration: 20 April 2013 – 8 September 2013

Regular season
- H Newman Reid Trophy: Sydney Ice Dogs (1st title)
- Season MVP: Jeff Martens (North Stars)
- Top scorer: Jeff Martens (67 points) (North Stars)

Goodall Cup
- Champions: Sydney Ice Dogs
- Runners-up: Newcastle North Stars
- Finals MVP: Anthony Kimlin (Ice Dogs)

AIHL seasons
- 2012 2014

The 2013 AIHL season was the 14th season of the Australian Ice Hockey League (AIHL). It ran from 20 April 2013 until 1 September 2013, with the Goodall Cup finals following on the 7 and 8 September. The Sydney Ice Dogs won both the H Newman Ried Trophy for finishing first in the regular season, and the Goodall Cup after defeating the Newcastle North Stars in the final.

== Teams ==
In 2013 the AIHL had 8 teams competing in the league.

2013 AIHL teams
Team	City	Arena	Head coach	Captain
Adelaide Adrenaline	(South Australia) Adelaide	IceArenA	(Australia) Ryan O'Handley	(Australia) Greg Oddy
Canberra Knights	(Australian Capital Territory) Canberra	Phillip Ice Skating Centre	(Finland) Matti Louma	(Australia) Mark Rummukainen
Melbourne Ice	(Victoria (state)) Melbourne	Medibank Icehouse	(Australia) Sandy Gardner	(Canada) Jason Baclig
Melbourne Mustangs	(Victoria (state)) Melbourne	Medibank Icehouse	(Australia) Brad Vigon	(Australia) Sean Jones
Newcastle North Stars	(New South Wales) Newcastle	Hunter Ice Skating Stadium	(Australia) Garry Doré	(Canada) Ray Sheffield
Perth Thunder	(Western Australia) Perth	Perth Ice Arena	(United Kingdom) Stan Scott	(Australia) Samuel Wilson
Sydney Bears	(New South Wales) Sydney	Sydney Ice Arena	(Australia) Vladimir Rubes	(Australia) Michael Schlamp
Sydney Ice Dogs	(New South Wales) Sydney	Liverpool Catholic Club Ice Rink	(Australia) Ron Kuprowsky	(Australia) Robert Malloy

== League business ==
In October 2012 it was announced that the 2013 season would be played with eight teams as the Gold Coast Blue Tongues' licence was suspended due to the team being unable to secure a home venue for 2013. The Blue Tongues were forced out of their arena during the 2012 season when the AIHL deemed it to not be up to specifications for the league forcing the team to temporarily relocate to Brisbane for the remainder of the season. It was also announced that the suspension on the Sydney Ice Dogs had been lifted allowing the team to ice four imports again. The Ice Dogs were restricted to three for the 2012 season by the league due to breaches of the league's code of conduct. Following the Annual General Meeting (AGM) it was announced that the third period of play has been increased from 15 minutes to 20 minutes, while the first two remain 15 minutes in length. The change was in response to fans calling for the league to align itself with international hockey which plays three 20 minute periods. The Melbourne Mustangs revealed their new logo and jerseys for the start of the season featuring a redesigned mustang horse, holding an ice hockey stick. The new jerseys include a white home jersey, a black away jersey and an orange third jersey which is being released as off-ice apparel only. The Sydney Ice Dogs also revealed their new jerseys with an aqua green away jersey and a white home jersey. The change in colours was made as part of a deal with corporate naming sponsor Reach Crane Trucks and will be in place for three years, the duration of their deal with Reach Crane Trucks. Their previous colours of maroon, yellow, blue, black and white will remain as the team's corporate colours.

On 17 February the AIHL announced that it had entered into a partnership with Fox Sports in which a game of the week will be aired on the network as part of a 60-minute program which also includes league and state federation news and AIHL highlights. The Canberra Knights held an exhibition game on 23 March 2013 with the team competing against a team of former Knights' players for the Soldier On charity. The Knights won the game 6–5.

=== Personnel changes ===
Following the AGM the AIHL announced that Tyler Lovering had been re-elected to the commission as Assistant Commissioner until 2014. Ben Kiely and Alexandra Lata had both received a one-year extension to their terms on the commission, with Lata being appointed Deputy Commissioner. The AIHL have also elected Robert Bannerman and Joshua Chye to the commission to serve as Commissioner and Assistant Commissioner respectively. In December 2012 the Melbourne Mustangs announced that they had appointed Brad Vigon as head coach, replacing Steve Laforet who had been fired at the end of the 2012 season. Following the end of the 2012 season the Melbourne Ice announced that both president Andy Lamrock and head coach Paul Watson had stepped down from their positions. In November 2012 the Ice announced that former Ice Hockey Victoria president Emma Poynton as successor to Lamrock as the club's president. In February 2013 the Ice appointed assistant coach Sandy Gardner to the head coach position.

=== Player transfers ===
Players signed

Player	Previous team	New team	Ref
(Australia) Travis Alabaster	No team	Melbourne Mustangs	
(Australia) Jonathan Bale	Gold Coast Blue Tongues	Sydney Bears	
(Australia) Alistair Band	Cardiff Devils NL	Canberra Knights	
(Canada) Simon Barg	No team	Sydney Ice Dogs	
(Australia) Jan Bejcek	ECSL Sting	Sydney Bears	
(United States) Brian Berger	Marian University	Perth Thunder	
(Canada) Luc-Olivier Blain	University of Ottawa	Adelaide Adrenaline	
(Australia) Paul Bond	ECSL Raptors	Sydney Bears	
(Australia) Jamie Bourke	No team	Melbourne Mustangs	
(Australia) Tyson Boyd	Adelaide Blackhawks	Adelaide Adrenaline	
(Canada) Jordan Braid	Columbus Cottonmouths	Canberra Knights	
(Australia) Russel Brewer	No team	Adelaide Adrenaline	
(Australia) Dale Burgess	No team	Sydney Ice Dogs	
(Australia) Dylan Burgess	Sydney Maple Leafs	Sydney Ice Dogs	
(Australia) Jack Carpenter	Melbourne Mustangs	Melbourne Ice	
(Australia) Jayson Chalker	ECSL Vipers	Newcastle North Stars	
(Australia) Robert Clark	No team	Melbourne Mustangs	
(Australia) Stuart Cole-Clark	ECSL Vipers	Newcastle North Stars	
(Canada) Dan Clarke	Tulsa Oilers	Perth Thunder	
(Canada) Pier-Olivier Cotnoir	Norwich University	Newcastle North Stars	
(Australia) Fred Coutts	West Coast Lightning	Perth Thunder	
(Australia) Todd Cutter	No team	Melbourne Mustangs	
(Australia) Kevin Darcy	Marian University	Perth Thunder	
(Australia) James David	Adelaide Falcons	Adelaide Adrenaline	
(Australia) Michael Fairlamb	Adelaide Blackhawks	Canberra Knights	
(Australia) Kayne Fedor	Adelaide Tigers B2	Perth Thunder	
(United States) Michael Forney	Colorado Eagles	Perth Thunder	
(South Africa) Robin Forsythe	No team	Melbourne Mustangs	
(United States) Chris Frank	Sheffield Steelers	Melbourne Ice	
(United States) Ian Fulion	No team	Canberra Knights	
(Australia) Tim Fulton	No team	Canberra Knights	
(Australia) Adam Geric	Gold Coast Blue Tongues	Newcastle North Stars	
(United States) Kevin Glanzman	No team	Melbourne Mustangs	
(Canada) John Gordon	EV Füssen	Melbourne Ice	
(Australia) Alexander Hall	Gold Coast Blue Tongues	Melbourne Mustangs	
(Australia) Robert Haselhurst	No team	Perth Thunder	
(United Kingdom) Matthew Haywood	Braehead Clan	Adelaide Adrenaline	
(Australia) Stuart Higgins	No team	Melbourne Mustangs	
(Canada) Aaron Hoffman	No team	Perth Thunder	
(New Zealand) Stephen Huish	Northern Vikings	Perth Thunder	
(Australia) Brad Hunt	No team	Canberra Knights	
(New Zealand) Lyle Idoine	Botany Swarm	Sydney Bears	
(Australia) Jayson James	Adelaide Falcons B	Adelaide Adrenaline	
(Australia) David Jeremy	ECSL Vipers	Newcastle North Stars	
(Finland) Mikko Jortikka	HC Keski-Uusimaa	Canberra Knights	
(Latvia) Renars Kazanovs	SMScredit.lv	Sydney Bears	
(United States) John Kennedy	Canberra Knights	Newcastle North Stars	
(Australia) Anthony Kimlin	Gold Coast Blue Tongues	Sydney Ice Dogs	
(Australia) Martin Kolos	ECSL Sting	Sydney Bears	
(Czech Republic) Jan Koubek	HC Kobra Praha	Sydney Bears	
(Canada) Justin Levac	Orlando Solar Bears	Canberra Knights	
(Australia) David Lewis	No team	Canberra Knights	
(United States) Ryan Lowe	No team	Sydney Bears	
(Australia) Silvan Maedev	No team	Sydney Bears	
(Canada) Jeff Martens	Friesland Flyers	Newcastle North Stars	
(Australia) Glen Mayer	No team	Melbourne Ice	
(Australia) Michael McDowell	No team	Melbourne Mustangs	
(Canada) Eric McKenna	No team	Sydney Ice Dogs	
(Canada) Dan Mohle	Wilfrid Laurier University	Perth Thunder	
(Australia) Alan Moss	No team	Melbourne Mustangs	
(Australia) Steven Naidovski	Sydney Bears	Sydney Ice Dogs	
(Australia) Ben O'Driscoll	Gold Coast Blue Tongues	Sydney Bears	
(United States) Patrick O'Kane	Mälarö HF	Melbourne Mustangs	
(Australia) Joshua O'Neil	ECSL Raptors	Sydney Bears	
(Canada) Jon Olthuis	Idaho Steelheads	Melbourne Mustangs	
(United States) Dominic Osman	Hull Stingrays	Newcastle North Stars	
(Canada) Brit Ouellette	ECDC Memmingen	Adelaide Adrenaline	
(Canada) Travis Ouellette	Ferris State University	Adelaide Adrenaline	
(New Zealand) Rick Parry	Jokers de Cergy	Adelaide Adrenaline	
(Australia) Robert Pasminka	No team	Sydney Bears	
(United Kingdom) Kevin Phillips	Braehead Clan	Adelaide Adrenaline	
(New Zealand) Jaden Pine-Murphy	New Plymouth	Melbourne Ice	
(United States) Matt Puntureri	Danbury Whalers	Sydney Ice Dogs	
(Canada) Shai Rabinowitz	No team	Newcastle North Stars	
(Australia) Luke Read	ECSL Sting	Sydney Bears	
(Australia) Denis Ristic	Adelaide Redwings	Adelaide Adrenaline	
(Australia) Ollie Rozdarz	No team	Canberra Knights	
(Australia) Christopher Sekura	No team	Sydney Ice Dogs	
(Australia) Francisco Sevilla	No team	Sydney Bears	
(Australia) Luke Shafren	No team	Newcastle North Stars	
(Australia) Hayden Sheard	ECSL North Stars	Newcastle North Stars	
(Australia) Chris Slauenwhite	Sydney Bears	Canberra Knights	
(Australia) Michael Smart	Sydney Bears	Perth Thunder	
(Australia) Shane Southwood	Orangeville Americans	Sydney Ice Dogs	
(Canada) Matt Strueby	Colorado Eagles	Perth Thunder	
(France) Maxime Suzzarini	Brûleurs de Loups	Canberra Knights	
(Australia) Matt Taylor	No team	Canberra Knights	
(United States) Joe Tolles	Wheeling Nailers	Perth Thunder	
(Australia) Tom Voller	No team	Melbourne Mustangs	
(Australia) Dillan Wallace	Adelaide Redwings	Adelaide Adrenaline	
(Australia) Cameron Walsh	No team	Perth Thunder	
(United Kingdom) Patrick Ward	No team	Sydney Ice Dogs	
(United States) Jack Wolgemuth	No team	Melbourne Mustangs	

Players lost

Player	Previous team	New team	Ref
(Australia) Matthew Anderson	Melbourne Mustangs	No team	
(Australia) Sam Austin	Newcastle North Stars	ECSL North Stars	
(United States) Brian Bales	Newcastle North Stars	No team	
(Canada) Aaron Barton	Adelaide Adrenaline	Knoxville Ice Bears	
(Australia) Sam Bavin	Perth Thunder	No team	
(Australia) Alan Becken	Sydney Bears	ECSL Heat	
(Australia) Dana Bennett	Canberra Knights	No team	
(Australia) Ryan Bennett	Melbourne Mustangs	No team	
(Australia) Sam Bennett	Adelaide Adrenaline	Adelaide Redwings	
(Australia) Enrico Bergamin	Melbourne Mustangs	No team	
(Australia) Robert Bird	Perth Thunder	No team	
(Canada) Jeremy Boyer	Newcastle North Stars	Quad City Mallards	
(Australia) Jayden Braden	Sydney Bears	No team	
(United States) Mike Brown	Canberra Knights	Danbury Whalers	
(Australia) Jack Carpenter	Melbourne Mustangs	Melbourne Ice	
(Australia) Matt Cernec	Canberra Knights	No team	
(Australia) Aaron Clayworth	Canberra Knights	No team	
(Australia) Scott Clemie	Sydney Bears	No team	
(Australia) Stuart Clemie	Sydney Bears	ECSL Vipers	
(Australia) Scott Connelly	Sydney Bears	ECSL Sting	
(Canada) Kevin Day	Newcastle North Stars	No team	
(Australia) Cassian Delsar	Adelaide Adrenaline	Adelaide Tigers	
(Australia) Stuart Denman	Melbourne Ice	Retired	
(United Kingdom) Colin Downie	Sydney Ice Dogs	No team	
(Australia) Dean Dunstan	Melbourne Mustangs	No team	
(Canada) Jack Ebner	Melbourne Mustangs	No team	
(Australia) Nickolas Eckhardt	Canberra Knights	No team	
(Canada) Craig Gallo	Sydney Bears	Osby IK	
(United States) Phil Ginand	Perth Thunder	Bloomington Blaze	
(United States) Kirk Golden	Sydney Ice Dogs	Cape Cod Bluefins	
(United Kingdom) Paul Graham	Perth Thunder	No team	
(Australia) Lucien Hackett	Sydney Bears	ECSL Sting	
(Australia) James Herbert	Sydney Ice Dogs	No team	
(Australia) Christopher James	Melbourne Mustangs	No team	
(Canada) Brady Johnston	Sydney Bears	Hedemora SK	
(Australia) Mike Johnston	Canberra Knights	No team	
(United States) John Kennedy	Canberra Knights	Newcastle North Stars	
(Netherlands) Matt Korthuis	Melbourne Ice	No team	
(Canada) Robbie Lawrance	Newcastle North Stars	Louisiana IceGators	
(Canada) Scott Levitt	Melbourne Mustangs	No team	
(Canada) Brett Liscomb	Adelaide Adrenaline	Louisiana IceGators	
(Australia) Shane Hardy	Melbourne Mustangs	No team	
(Czech Republic) Martin Kutek	Melbourne Ice	No team	
(Finland) Sami Mantere	Adelaide Adrenaline	Adelaide Redwings	
(Australia) Joel McFadden	Sydney Bears	No team	
(Australia) Christopher McPhail	Canberra Knights	No team	
(United States) Casey Mignone	Sydney Ice Dogs	Cape Cod Bluefins	
(Australia) Laurie Mock	Sydney Bears	No team	
(United States) Matt Monaghan	Sydney Ice Dogs	No team	
(United States) Dean Moore	Melbourne Mustangs	IF Sundsvall Hockey	
(Belgium) Mitch Morgan	Adelaide Adrenaline	HYC Herentals	
(Australia) Steven Naidovski	Sydney Bears	Sydney Ice Dogs	
(Canada) Dan Nicholls	Adelaide Adrenaline	No team	
(Australia) Gicu Oprea	Newcastle North Stars	No team	
(Australia) Dean Peterson	Adelaide Adrenaline	No team	
(United States) Nic Polaski	Canberra Knights	No team	
(Australia) Troy Robertson	Melbourne Mustangs	No team	
(Australia) Gabriel Robledo	Sydney Ice Dogs	No team	
(Australia) Jayden Ryan	Sydney Bears	ECSL Raptors	
(Canada) Lucas Schott	Canberra Knights	Dayton Demonz	
(Australia) Paul Shumak	Sydney Bears	No team	
(Australia) Chris Slauenwhite	Sydney Bears	Canberra Knights	
(Australia) Michael Smart	Sydney Bears	Perth Thunder	
(Canada) Kiefer Smiley	Perth Thunder	Mississippi Surge	
(Czech Republic) Jaroslav Spurny	Sydney Bears	No team	
(Australia) Andrew Stapleton	Adelaide Adrenaline	No team	
(United States) John Sullivan	Melbourne Mustangs	Columbus Cottonmouths	
(Finland) Tuomas Takkula	Newcastle North Stars	No team	
(Australia) Michael Thornburn	Melbourne Mustangs	No team	
(Australia) Tallen Voelkel	Newcastle North Stars	No team	
(Canada) Mike Werner	Adelaide Adrenaline	No team	
(Australia) Andrew White	Sydney Ice Dogs	No team	
(Canada) Aaron Wilson	Perth Thunder	No team	
(United States) Doug Wilson	Melbourne Ice	No team	
(Canada) Oliver Wren	Melbourne Mustangs	No team	

== Regular season ==
The regular season started on 20 April 2013 and ran through to 1 September 2013 before the top four teams compete in the Goodall Cup playoff series.

The Sydney Ice Dogs won the H Newman Reid Trophy after finishing the regular season with the most points, 61. Newcastle North Stars' Jeff Martens won the Most Valuable Player award, after finishing as the league's top scorer with 67 points. Anthony Kimlin of the Sydney Ice Dogs was named the Australian Player of the Year and Best Goaltender, finishing with a save percentage 0.919. The Sydney Bears' Cameron Todd won the award for Best Rookie and John Gordon of the Melbourne Ice was named Best Defenceman.

=== April ===
Game	Date	Time	Away	Score	Home	Location	Attendance	Recap
1	20 April	17:45	Newcastle North Stars	6–2	Sydney Ice Dogs	Baulkham Hills	500	
2	20 April	17:00	Melbourne Ice	7–2	Melbourne Mustangs	Melbourne	1300	
3	20 April	17:30	Adelaide Adrenaline	2–3	Canberra Knights	Canberra	750	
4	21 April	15:30	Adelaide Adrenaline	9–2	Sydney Bears	Baulkham Hills		
5	27 April	16:30	Melbourne Ice	5–2	Perth Thunder	Perth		
6	27 April	17:30	Melbourne Mustangs	6–4	Canberra Knights	Canberra	750	
7	27 April	18:00	Sydney Ice Dogs	5–4	Sydney Bears	Baulkham Hills		
8	28 April	16:30	Melbourne Ice	9–3	Perth Thunder	Perth		
9	28 April	17:00	Melbourne Mustangs	4–5	Sydney Ice Dogs	Liverpool	300	
10	28 April	17:00	Sydney Bears	1–2	Newcastle North Stars	Newcastle		

=== May ===
Game	Date	Time	Away	Score	Home	Location	Attendance	Recap
11	4 May	17:00	Perth Thunder	2–13	Newcastle North Stars	Newcastle		
12	4 May	17:00	Sydney Ice Dogs	3 – 4 (SO)	Melbourne Mustangs	Melbourne	575	
13	4 May	18:00	Canberra Knights	1–6	Sydney Bears	Baulkham Hills		
14	5 May	15:30	Sydney Ice Dogs	4 – 3 (SO)	Melbourne Ice	Melbourne	1100	
15	5 May	15:30	Perth Thunder	5–2	Sydney Bears	Baulkham Hills		
16	11 May	17:00	Adelaide Adrenaline	6–4	Melbourne Ice	Melbourne	1100	
17	11 May	17:30	Melbourne Mustangs	5–1	Canberra Knights	Canberra		
18	11 May	18:00	Newcastle North Stars	1–2	Sydney Bears	Baulkham Hills		
19	12 May	15:00	Adelaide Adrenaline	3–9	Melbourne Ice	Melbourne		
20	12 May	17:00	Canberra Knights	4–3	Newcastle North Stars	Newcastle		
21	12 May	17:00	Melbourne Mustangs	2–4	Sydney Ice Dogs	Liverpool	200	
22	18 May	17:00	Perth Thunder	0–3	Sydney Ice Dogs	Liverpool	200	
23	18 May	17:00	Newcastle North Stars	4–2	Melbourne Mustangs	Melbourne	600	
24	18 May	17:30	Sydney Bears	6–1	Canberra Knights	Canberra		
25	19 May	15:30	Newcastle North Stars	2–0	Melbourne Ice	Melbourne	1000	
26	19 May	15:30	Perth Thunder	4–3	Sydney Bears	Baulkham Hills		
27	25 May	16:30	Sydney Ice Dogs	5–3	Perth Thunder	Perth		
28	25 May	17:00	Canberra Knights	1–9	Melbourne Ice	Melbourne	780	
29	25 May	17:00	Adelaide Adrenaline	4–7	Newcastle North Stars	Newcastle		
30	26 May	15:30	Adelaide Adrenaline	2–6	Sydney Bears	Baulkham Hills		
31	26 May	15:30	Canberra Knights	3–5	Melbourne Mustangs	Melbourne	400	
32	26 May	16:30	Sydney Ice Dogs	5–6	Perth Thunder	Perth		

=== June ===
Game	Date	Time	Away	Score	Home	Location	Attendance	Recap
33	1 June	16:30	Sydney Bears	3–6	Adelaide Adrenaline	Adelaide	425	
34	1 June	17:00	Perth Thunder	5–6	Melbourne Mustangs	Melbourne	350	
35	1 June	17:00	Melbourne Ice	3–4	Newcastle North Stars	Newcastle		
36	1 June	17:30	Sydney Ice Dogs	5–3	Canberra Knights	Canberra		
37	2 June	15:30	Perth Thunder	9–3	Melbourne Mustangs	Melbourne	290	
38	2 June	16:30	Sydney Bears	4–2	Adelaide Adrenaline	Adelaide	390	
39	2 June	17:00	Melbourne Ice	3 – 4 (SO)	Sydney Ice Dogs	Liverpool	300	
40	6 June	20:00	Melbourne Mustangs	1–2	Melbourne Ice	Melbourne	1150	
41	8 June	16:30	Adelaide Adrenaline	6–7	Perth Thunder	Perth		
42	8 June	17:00	Sydney Bears	1 – 2 (SO)	Sydney Ice Dogs	Liverpool	300	
43	8 June	17:30	Newcastle North Stars	9–1	Canberra Knights	Canberra		
44	9 June	16:30	Adelaide Adrenaline	6–8	Perth Thunder	Perth		
45	9 June	17:00	Sydney Bears	2–4	Newcastle North Stars	Newcastle		
46	9 June	17:00	Canberra Knights	1–6	Sydney Ice Dogs	Liverpool	250	
47	15 June	16:30	Melbourne Mustangs	2 – 3 (SO)	Adelaide Adrenaline	Adelaide	350	
48	15 June	17:00	Newcastle North Stars	3–4	Sydney Ice Dogs	Liverpool	300	
49	15 June	17:30	Melbourne Ice	12–1	Canberra Knights	Canberra		
50	16 June	15:30	Melbourne Ice	4–3	Sydney Bears	Baulkham Hills		
51	16 June	16:30	Melbourne Mustangs	6 – 5 (SO)	Adelaide Adrenaline	Adelaide	362	
52	16 June	17:00	Sydney Ice Dogs	0–1	Newcastle North Stars	Newcastle		
53	22 June	17:00	Canberra Knights	1–10	Melbourne Mustangs	Melbourne	400	
54	22 June	17:00	Adelaide Adrenaline	5–3	Newcastle North Stars	Newcastle	600	
55	23 June	15:30	Canberra Knights	0–16	Melbourne Ice	Melbourne	1100	
56	23 June	17:00	Adelaide Adrenaline	4–1	Sydney Ice Dogs	Liverpool	400	
57	29 June	16:30	Canberra Knights	1–3	Perth Thunder	Perth		
58	29 June	16:30	Newcastle North Stars	3 – 2 (SO)	Adelaide Adrenaline	Adelaide	350	
59	29 June	17:00	Sydney Bears	3–7	Melbourne Ice	Melbourne	1000	
60	30 June	15:30	Sydney Bears	2–6	Melbourne Mustangs	Melbourne	500	
61	30 June	16:30	Canberra Knights	2–3	Perth Thunder	Perth		
62	30 June	16:30	Newcastle North Stars	5 – 4 (SO)	Adelaide Adrenaline	Adelaide	300	

=== July ===
Game	Date	Time	Away	Score	Home	Location	Attendance	Recap
63	6 July	16:30	Melbourne Mustangs	2–5	Perth Thunder	Perth		
64	6 July	17:30	Adelaide Adrenaline	5 – 4 (SO)	Canberra Knights	Canberra		
65	7 July	16:30	Melbourne Mustangs	4–2	Perth Thunder	Perth		
66	7 July	17:00	Adelaide Adrenaline	3–6	Sydney Ice Dogs	Liverpool	250	
67	13 July	16:30	Canberra Knights	0–6	Adelaide Adrenaline	Adelaide	378	
68	13 July	17:00	Perth Thunder	5 – 6 (SO)	Newcastle North Stars	Newcastle		
69	13 July	17:00	Sydney Bears	2–5	Melbourne Mustangs	Melbourne	400	
70	14 July	15:30	Sydney Bears	3–7	Melbourne Ice	Melbourne	900	
71	14 July	16:30	Canberra Knights	2–8	Adelaide Adrenaline	Adelaide	342	
72	14 July	17:00	Perth Thunder	6–4	Sydney Ice Dogs	Liverpool	350	
73	20 July	16:30	Newcastle North Stars	2–6	Perth Thunder	Perth		
74	20 July	17:00	Adelaide Adrenaline	5 – 4 (SO)	Melbourne Mustangs	Melbourne	320	
75	20 July	17:30	Melbourne Ice	4–2	Canberra Knights	Canberra		
76	20 July	18:00	Sydney Ice Dogs	3–0	Sydney Bears	Baulkham Hills	400	
77	21 July	15:30	Adelaide Adrenaline	6 – 7 (SO)	Melbourne Mustangs	Melbourne	330	
78	21 July	16:30	Newcastle North Stars	3–2	Perth Thunder	Perth		
79	21 July	17:00	Melbourne Ice	3–6	Sydney Ice Dogs	Liverpool	300	
80	27 July	16:30	Sydney Ice Dogs	6–4	Adelaide Adrenaline	Adelaide	213	
81	27 July	17:00	Perth Thunder	3–5	Melbourne Ice	Melbourne	1100	
82	27 July	17:00	Melbourne Mustangs	2–1	Newcastle North Stars	Newcastle		
83	28 July	15:30	Melbourne Mustangs	10–3	Sydney Bears	Baulkham Hills	180	
84	28 July	15:30	Perth Thunder	6 – 5 (SO)	Melbourne Ice	Melbourne	900	
85	28 July	16:30	Sydney Ice Dogs	1–5	Adelaide Adrenaline	Adelaide	216	
86	28 July	17:00	Canberra Knights	5–9	Newcastle North Stars	Newcastle		

=== August & September ===
Game	Date	Time	Away	Score	Home	Location	Attendance	Recap
87	3 August	17:00	Sydney Ice Dogs	5–3	Newcastle North Stars	Newcastle	800	
88	3 August	17:00	Melbourne Mustangs	4–2	Melbourne Ice	Melbourne	1200	
89	3 August	17:30	Sydney Bears	3–2	Canberra Knights	Canberra		
90	4 August	15:30	Newcastle North Stars	7–1	Sydney Bears	Baulkham Hills	300	
91	4 August	17:00	Canberra Knights	1–8	Sydney Ice Dogs	Liverpool	250	
92	10 August	16:30	Perth Thunder	6–4	Adelaide Adrenaline	Adelaide	368	
93	10 August	17:00	Melbourne Ice	4–8	Newcastle North Stars	Newcastle		
94	10 August	18:00	Canberra Knights	1–3	Sydney Bears	Baulkham Hills		
95	11 August	15:30	Melbourne Ice	5–2	Sydney Bears	Baulkham Hills	200	
96	11 August	16:30	Perth Thunder	4–3	Adelaide Adrenaline	Adelaide	289	
97	15 August	20:00	Melbourne Ice	4–3	Melbourne Mustangs	Melbourne	1000	
98	17 August	16:30	Sydney Bears	0–4	Perth Thunder	Perth		
99	17 August	17:00	Sydney Ice Dogs	5–3	Melbourne Ice	Melbourne	900	
100	17 August	17:30	Newcastle North Stars	8–0	Canberra Knights	Canberra		
101	18 August	15:30	Sydney Ice Dogs	3–1	Melbourne Mustangs	Melbourne	600	
102	18 August	16:30	Sydney Bears	3–5	Perth Thunder	Perth		
103	24 August	16:30	Melbourne Ice	6 – 5 (SO)	Adelaide Adrenaline	Adelaide	352	
104	24 August	17:00	Sydney Bears	1–4	Sydney Ice Dogs	Liverpool	400	
105	24 August	17:00	Melbourne Mustangs	1–6	Newcastle North Stars	Newcastle		
106	24 August	17:30	Perth Thunder	7–2	Canberra Knights	Canberra		
107	25 August	15:30	Melbourne Mustangs	6–2	Sydney Bears	Baulkham Hills	200	
108	25 August	16:30	Melbourne Ice	5–2	Adelaide Adrenaline	Adelaide	329	
109	25 August	17:30	Perth Thunder	6–2	Canberra Knights	Canberra		
110	31 August	17:00	Newcastle North Stars	5–1	Melbourne Ice	Melbourne	1100	
111	31 August	17:30	Sydney Ice Dogs	8–2	Canberra Knights	Canberra		
112	1 September	15:30	Newcastle North Stars	4 – 5 (SO)	Melbourne Mustangs	Melbourne	800	

=== Standings ===
Team	GP	W	OTW	OTL	L	GF	GA	GDF	PTS
Sydney Ice Dogs	28	18	3	1	6	117	80	+37	61
Newcastle North Stars	28	17	3	1	7	132	75	+57	58
Perth Thunder	28	17	1	1	9	127	114	+13	54
Melbourne Ice	28	16	1	3	8	147	93	+54	53
Melbourne Mustangs	28	12	4	2	10	118	103	+15	46
Adelaide Adrenaline	28	8	3	5	12	125	124	+1	35
Sydney Bears	28	7	0	1	20	73	120	−47	22
Canberra Knights	28	2	0	1	25	51	181	−130	7

Qualified for the Goodall Cup playoffs	H Newman Reid Trophy winners

=== Statistics ===
==== Scoring leaders ====
List shows the ten top skaters sorted by points, then goals.

Player	Team	GP	G	A	Pts	PIM	POS
Jeff Martens	Newcastle North Stars	28	31	36	67	52	F
Jason Baclig	Melbourne Ice	28	23	39	62	12	F
Pier-Olivier Cotnoir	Newcastle North Stars	26	28	29	57	44	F
Simon Barg	Sydney Ice Dogs	28	26	29	55	10	F
Matt Armstrong	Melbourne Ice	24	26	28	54	50	F
Matt Puntereri	Sydney Ice Dogs	27	28	24	52	12	F
Patrick O'Kane	Melbourne Mustangs	28	30	21	51	26	F
Dominic Osman	Newcastle North Stars	28	18	33	51	42	F
Jamie Bourke	Melbourne Mustangs	21	22	25	47	80	F
Michael Forney	Perth Thunder	16	11	36	47	12	F

==== Leading goaltenders ====
Only the top five goaltenders, based on save percentage with a minimum 40% of the teams ice time.

Player	Team	MIP	SOG	GA	GAA	SVS%	SO
Anthony Kimlin	Sydney Ice Dogs	1222	744	60	2.46	0.919	2
Olivier Martin	Newcastle North Stars	1206	694	59	2.45	0.915	3
Daniel Clarke	Perth Thunder	646	435	41	3.17	0.906	1
Renars Kazanovs	Sydney Bears	747	505	50	3.35	0.901	0
Jon Olthuis	Melbourne Mustangs	1150	823	84	3.65	0.898	0

=== Season awards ===
Below lists the 2013 AIHL regular season award winners.

Award	Name	Team
MVP	(Canada) Jeff Martens	Newcastle North Stars
Goaltender	(Australia) Anthony Kimlin	Sydney Ice Dogs
Defenceman	(Canada) John Gordon	Melbourne Ice
Rookie	(Australia) Cameron Todd	Sydney Bears
Local player	(Australia) Anthony Kimlin	Sydney Ice Dogs

== Goodall Cup playoffs ==
The 2013 playoffs started on 7 September 2013, with the Goodall Cup final held on 8 September. Following the end of the regular season the top four teams advanced to the playoff series. All three games were held at the Medibank Icehouse in Docklands, Victoria, the home of the Melbourne Ice and Melbourne Mustangs. The series was a single game elimination with the two winning semi-finalists advancing to the Goodall Cup final. The Sydney Ice Dogs won the Goodall Cup (2nd title) with a 6-2 victory over the Newcastle North Stars. Anthony Kimlin’s defensive efforts for the Ice Dogs earned him the award of Most Valuable Player (MVP) for the finals series.

Semifinals
1	Melbourne Ice	2
4	Sydney Ice Dogs	4
3	Perth Thunder	1
2	Newcastle North Stars	6

Final
Sydney Ice Dogs	6
Newcastle North Stars	3

=== Semi-finals ===
All times are UTC+10:00

7 September 2013; 16:00	Melbourne Ice	2–4 (0–0, 1–4, 1–0)	Sydney Ice Dogs	Medibank Icehouse; Attendance: 1100

Game reference

Dahlen Phillips
Goalies
Anthony Kimlin
Referee:
Jeff Scott
Linesmen:
Tristan Reese
Kent Unwin

	0 – 1	Malloy (McGregor, Ward)
	0 – 2	Barg (PP) (Puntureri, Dunwoodie)
	0 – 3	Puntureri (PP) (T.Stephenson, Ward)
	0 – 4	Malloy (PP) (unassisted)
Baclig (PP) (Armstrong)	1 – 4
Powell (PP) (Webster, Baclig)	2 – 4

33 min
Penalties
24 min
27
Shots
34

7 September 2013; 19:30	Perth Thunder	1–6 (0–2, 1–2, 0–2)	Newcastle North Stars	Medibank Icehouse; Attendance: 850

Game reference

Dan Clarke
Goalies
Olivier Martin
Referee:
Cory Ross
Linesmen:
Stephen De Witt
Daryl Hamilton

	0 – 1	Cotnoir (PP) (unassisted)
	0 – 2	Martens (SH) (unassisted)
	0 – 3	Cotnoir (PP) (Martens, Taylor)
	0 – 4	Osman (Upton, Starke)
Unknown (Kyros)	1 – 4
	1 – 5	Taylor (Osman, Upton)
	1 – 6	Cotnoir (Martens, Kennedy)

16 min
Penalties
10 min
28
Shots
33

=== Final ===
8 September 2013; 16:00	Newcastle North Stars	3–6 (1–2, 0–1, 2–3)	Sydney Ice Dogs	Medibank Icehouse; Attendance: 900

Game reference

Olivier Martin
Goalies
Anthony Kimlin
Referee:
Jeff Scott
Linesmen:
Stephen De Witt
Daryl Hamilton

	0 – 1	Cliff (PP) (S.Stephenson, McGregor)
	0 – 2	T.Stephenson (SH) (Barg)
Osman (PP) (Taylor, Kennedy)	1 – 2
	1 – 3	T.Stephenson (PP) (Puntureri, Barg)
	1 – 4	T.Stephenson (PP) (Barg, Manco)
	1 – 5	Barg (Dunwoodie)
	1 – 6	Barg (Dunwoodie, Ward)
Osman (PP) (Kennedy, Taylor)	2 – 6
Osman (PP) (Cotnoir, Martens)	3 – 6

14 min
Penalties
22 min
32
Shots
30

== Attendances ==
The 2013 AIHL clubs listed by average home attendance:

#	Club	Average
1	Melbourne Ice	1,053
2	Newcastle North Stars	687
3	Melbourne Mustangs	546
4	Sydney Ice Dogs	537
5	Perth Thunder	521
6	Sydney Bears	499
7	Canberra Knights	447
8	Adelaide Adrenaline	403
