= 2021 AIHL season =

- League: Australian Ice Hockey League
- Sport: Ice hockey
- Duration: Cancelled

AIHL seasons
- 2020 2022

The 2021 AIHL season was going to be the 21st season of the Australian Ice Hockey League (AIHL), following the cancellation of the 2020 season. However, on 2 February 2021, the AIHL announced the season would not go ahead, citing ongoing border restriction issues between different Australian states as the reason for the cancellation. For the second year in a row, the Goodall Cup would not be contested.

== League Business ==
In 2021 the AIHL experienced change of leadership and the cancellation of a second consecutive season. On 28 January 2021, David Turik resigned as AIHL Commissioner by mutual consent with immediate effect. No reason was provided publicly for his resignation. On 2 February 2021, the AIHL announced the cancellation of the 2021 AIHL season due to domestic and international border restriction issues. The AIHL did also indicate in the announcement that there would be some form of domestic hockey played in 2021, with further details expected on 10 February 2021. On 10 February, the AIHL released initial information about the formation of regionalised super series' between different AIHL teams in NSW, ACT and Victoria. There was no mention about Adelaide or Perth and little further detail about the super series' themselves.

=== News ===
On 21 November 2020, former AIHL Chairman, Tim Frampton, died. Tim had been AIHL chairman for four years between 2006 and 2010. Tim led the modernisation of the league's governance with the introduction of the licensing system for the league's clubs and the launch of the league's website and social media program. On 11 March 2021, CBR Brave forward, Lachlan Seary, died. Seary made his debut for the Brave in 2019, appearing in seven matches. In addition to playing in the AIHL, Seary represented the Australian Capital Territory on multiple occasions in the 2016 and 2018 DeFris and Tange tournaments. On 18 March 2021, former Melbourne Ice president, Bernie O’Brien, died. O’Brien served as Ice president for three years. In addition to his activities for the Ice, Bernie was an active volunteer for Ice Hockey Victoria, serving on several committees and special projects.

=== Personnel changes ===
AIHL teams made had three major personnel changes in 2021. On 22 April 2021, the Melbourne Ice announced the appointment of ex-player Chris Yule as their new head coach. Yule replaced Canadian Michael Marshall, who was never involved in a single AIHL match due to the 2020 season cancellation. On 4 May 2021, the Melbourne Mustangs announced the signing of American head coach Steve Zanlunghi. Zanlunghi comes from a hockey family and is the former head of Jeep Asia Pacific. On 23 November 2021, Sydney Ice Dogs head coach, Andrew Petrie, announced his resignation due to family reasons. Petrie ended his second stint as head coach with the Ice Dogs after four years with the team, having re-joined in 2017. In his two seasons in charge of the Ice Dogs, he led the team to consecutive sixth-place finishes, missing out on finals. The Ice Dogs did not immediately announce a replacement head coach.

=== Player transfers ===
With no season planned for 2021, there is not a complete list of inclusions and departures for the league. There was however two major player departures announced or reported by AIHL clubs throughout 2021. On 10 April 2021, Melbourne Ice and Australia forward, Jason Baclig, left the club to return home to his native Canada. Baclig arrived in Australia in 2010 as an import for the Ice. Baclig played in 205 AIHL games, recorded 362 points and won four Goodall Cups. After becoming an Australian citizen, Baclig made his debut for Australia at the 2019 IIHF World Championship Division II Group A tournament, recording three points from his five games.

Matt Harvey, of the CBR Brave, announced he would be leaving the Brave and Canberra and returning to his native homeland of Canada with his young family. Harvey moved to Canberra in 2014 and joined the newly formed Brave team after the collapse of the Canberra Knights. Harvey quickly established himself as a versatile forward or defenseman for the capital team. In April 2018 he became the Brave's captain, the third player to be named to the role, succeeding Mark Rummukainen. Harvey played in 124 AIHL matches and notched 103 points in his career in Australia. Matt advised he would be returning to Canada to show his family where he grew up, meet family and participate in a beer league with his friends. Harvey said he would be returning to Canberra in the future.

=== Facility changes/upgrades ===
The process of building the National Ice Sports Center in Canberra progressed in 2020–21. On 3 September 2020, The ACT Government completed its expression of interest (EOI) process for the design and construction contract. The ACT Government selected South Australian based consortium, Cruachan Investments as the preferred developer from the EOI process. In November 2021 it was revealed Cruachan Investments would be ready to formally submit their project proposal to the ACT Government by the end of 2021.

17 February 2021, The IceArenA in Adelaide announced plans to upgrade the facility that was first opened in 1981. A third ice sheet would be installed along with an expansion to the main grandstand used for AIHL matches among other amenity upgrades.

=== Franchise bids ===
The AIHL Brisbane bid made a couple of key announcements in 2021 as the bid looked to build its case for future inclusion in the AIHL after officially being launched in August 2020. On 13 May 2021, the bid team announced the appointment of Queenslander Ben Spillane as the inaugural head coach of the proposed franchise team. Spillane joined the bidding team with a wealth of coaching experience behind him with the Queensland U18s and men's teams as well as the AJIHL team Brisbane Blitz. On 31 June 2021, the bid team revealed the proposed franchise team name, logo, and team colours. The team going forward would be known as the Brisbane Rampage. The Rampage's colours will be charcoal, maroon and gold. The logo consists of a stylised R clutched by a hand. A new website was launched along with new social media accounts.

== Alternative competitions ==
After the 2021 season was cancelled a number of alternative competitions involving AIHL teams were organised.

=== Yarra Cup ===
9 February 2021, in the absence of a full league season, the Melbourne Ice and Melbourne Mustangs organised and formed a two-team series between themselves named the Yarra Cup. The Yarra Cup was to feature 9 games and run between 22 May 2021 and 29 August 2021. All games would be played at the Melbourne Icehouse.

The first game of the Yarra Cup took place on 22 May 2021. The Mustangs defeated the Ice in the opening matchup 5–4 after a shootout. Both teams could not be separated after regular time with the scoreline locked at 4-4. No one could take advantage in overtime so the game was sent to a shootout to determine the winner. Sean Jones stepped up to score the winning penalty shot for the Mustangs in the shootout.

On 18 August 2021, due to ongoing COVID-19 outbreaks in Victoria, the Yarra Cup was officially cancelled. Games had previously been postponed but a decision was made to cancel the series with only one game having been played.

In a surprise, in November 2021, it was announced the Yarra Cup would be resuming following the opening up of Victoria and easing of restrictions. The series would now be three games long, with the new games scheduled for 28 November and 4 December. Game two saw the Mustangs triumph over the Ice for the second time in the series, effectively clinching the title. The Mustangs won the game by 9–3 with a five-goal third period cementing the victory. Game three followed a similar pattern to the last game. The Ice matched the Mustangs for two of the three periods but the Mustangs found the edge in one of the periods to clinch victory. In game three it was the second period where the Mustangs scored three unanswered goals. The final score seeing the Mustangs win 5–2. With the third victory, it meant the Mustangs swept the series 3–0 with a near perfect points record.

Table:

Pos	Team	Pld	W	OTW	OTL	L	GF	GA	GD	Pts
1	Melbourne Mustangs (C)	3	2	1	0	0	18	9	+9	8
2	Melbourne Ice	3	0	0	1	2	9	18	−9	1

Source: Ice Hockey News Australia
Rules for classification:
Tie-break: 1) points; 2) goal difference; 3) number of goals scored
Points: 3 points for regulation win; 2 points for OT or SO win; 1 point for OT or SO loss; 0 points for regulation loss
(C) Champion

Fixtures:

22 May 2021; 17:00	Melbourne Mustangs	5–4 (SO) (1–1, 2–2, 1–1)	Melbourne Ice	Melbourne Icehouse

Game reference

28 November 2021; 15:00	Melbourne Ice	3–9 (1–2, 1–2, 1–5)	Melbourne Mustangs	Melbourne Icehouse

Game reference

4 December 2021; 18:00	Melbourne Mustangs	5–2 (1–1, 3–0, 1–1)	Melbourne Ice	Melbourne Icehouse

Game reference

=== McCormack Cup ===
11 February 2021, the Sydney Ice Dogs, Newcastle Northstars and CBR Brave jointly announced a three-team tournament named the McCormack Cup. The tournament was named after APA Group boss Mick McCormack, would consist of 24 games plus finals and would run between May and August 2021. Games would be held in Canberra at Phillip Ice Skating Centre, Newcastle at Hunter Ice Skating Stadium and Central Coast at Erina Ice Arena. The Ice Dogs chose to play their home games at Erina on the NSW Central Coast due to limited ice time availability at their regular home, Macquarie Ice Rink in Sydney and to take top level hockey back to the refurbished Erina Ice Arena. The Sydney Bears chose not to take part in the McCormack Cup, and instead focus their attention on youth development. The Bears cited limited player availability and issues securing ice time at Macquarie Ice Rink as the major factors contributing to their decision.

Unlike the Yarra Cup, The McCormack Cup chose to shorten game period lengths to three fifteen-minute periods due to international border restrictions restricting participating teams from bringing in international import players.

After nine matches being played and a further six matches postponed or cancelled, on 31 July 2021, the decision was made to indefinitely postpone the remainder of the McCormack Cup tournament.

Table:

Pos	Team	Pld	W	OTW	OTL	L	GF	GA	GD	Pts
1	CBR Brave (C)	7	4	2	0	1	29	16	+13	16
2	Newcastle Northstars	5	2	0	1	2	13	16	−3	7
3	Sydney Ice Dogs	6	1	0	1	4	11	21	−10	4

Source: Ice Hockey News Australia
Rules for classification:
Tie-break: 1) points; 2) goal difference; 3) number of goals scored
Points: 3 points for regulation win; 2 points for OT or SO win; 1 point for OT or SO loss; 0 points for regulation loss
(C) Champion

Fixtures:

8 May 2021; 17:00	Sydney Ice Dogs	1–6 (0–1, 1–2, 0–3)	CBR Brave	Erina Ice Arena

Game reference

9 May 2021; 16:00	Newcastle Northstars	4–8 (1–2, 2–3, 1–3)	CBR Brave	Hunter Ice Skating Stadium

Game reference

15 May 2021; 17:30	CBR Brave	5–2 (0–0, 3–1, 2–1)	Sydney Ice Dogs	Phillip Ice Skating Centre

Game reference

22 May 2021; 17:00	Sydney Ice Dogs	1–3 (1–0, 0–1, 0–2)	Newcastle Northstars	Erina Ice Arena

Game reference

23 May 2021; 17:00	Sydney Ice Dogs	5–2 (0–0, 2–2, 3–0)	CBR Brave	Erina Ice Arena

Game reference

29 May 2021; 17:00	Newcastle Northstars	3–1 (0–0, 2–0, 1–1)	Sydney Ice Dogs	Hunter Ice Skating Stadium

Game reference

5 June 2021; 17:30	CBR Brave	2–1 (SO) (0–0, 1–1, 0–0, 0–0, 1–0)	Sydney Ice Dogs	Phillip Ice Skating Centre

Game reference

19 June 2021; 17:30	CBR Brave	2–1 (OT) (0–0, 1–0, 0–1, 1–0)	Newcastle Northstars	Phillip Ice Skating Centre

Game reference

20 June 2021; 17:00	CBR Brave	4–2 (1–0, 1–2, 2–0)	Newcastle Northstars	Phillip Ice Skating Centre

Game reference

=== Melbourne Ducks exhibitions ===
In April 2021, the Melbourne Ice announced it would take on the Melbourne Ducks in a two match exhibition series at IceHQ in May 2021. The Melbourne Ducks is IceHQ's junior team that formed an exhibition team made up of AIHL and Victorian Premier League players for the series. Game one was won by the Melbourne Ice with a 5-2 score line. Sam Hodic scored the opening goal of the game in the first period for the Ice. Jordan Warren scored the first ever goal for the Ducks in the second period. The Ducks levelled the two match series in game two with a last minute winner to seal a 5–4 victory. Kevin Peng of the Ice scored the opening goal of the game with the only goal of the first period. Corey Stringer scored the match winning goal in the third period with 7 seconds left on the clock.

=== Sydney Bears exhibitions ===
The Bears agreed to take on the Newcastle Northstars in three games. The first game, set for 24 April, would be played at Macquarie Ice Rink. The final two matches, set for 5 June and 7 August, would be played at Hunter Ice Skating Stadium. Game one saw the Bears defeat the Northstars 7–4. Game two saw the bears win again, defeating the Northstars 4–3 in overtime. Game three was postponed due to a COVID-19 outbreak in New South Wales (NSW) that brought in new restrictions for travel between Sydney and the NSW regions.

The Bears also organised a one-off exhibition game against an East Coast Super League (ECSL) All-Star team at Macquarie Ice Rink in May 2021. On 15 May 2021, the Bears defeated ECSL All Stars 10–2.

Despite being unannounced, on 2 June 2021, the Sydney Bears advised that a planned exhibition game against local rivals the Sydney Ice Dogs for 19 June 2021 would be cancelled due to the Ice Dogs withdrawing from participating in the planned game.

=== Capital Cup ===
13 April 2021, the Capital Cup was announced. The Capital Cup would be an 8-game series, scheduled for September 2021, and would see the CBR Brave play the Melbourne Ice and Mustangs for 4 games each, two in Melbourne and two in Canberra. On 18 August 2021, the Capital Cup was officially cancelled due to COVID-19 outbreaks and border restrictions.

=== Canberra Knights 40th Anniversary Exhibition ===
26 November 2021, the CBR Brave announced a one-off exhibition match against the defunct Canberra Knights to celebrate the 40th anniversary of the Knights and to mark Matt Harvey's last game for the Brave. The match would be played on Saturday 4 December 2021 at Phillip Ice Skating Centre. Matt Harvey announced he would be leaving Canberra and returning to his native Canada with his young family.

The game day rosters were announced on 2 December 2021 for both the Canberra Knights and CBR Brave. Both rosters consisted of current and former players for both teams.

Canberra Knights Roster
Goaltenders
(Australia) Alexandre Tetreault
Defencemen
(Australia) Andrew Brunt	(Australia) Timothy Cox	(Australia) Mark Rummukainen	(Australia) Darren Taylor
Forwards
(Australia) Jordon Brunt	(Australia) Jordie Gavin	(Australia) Christopher McPhail	(Australia) Kai Miettinen
(Australia) Jorma Miettinen	(Australia) Matt Lehoczky	(Australia) Tom Letki	(Australia) Luke Philps

CBR Brave Roster
Goaltenders
(Australia) Aleksi Toivonen
Defencemen
(Australia) Matt Buskas	(Australia) Mike Giorgi	(New Zealand) Matthew Harvey	(Australia) Nicholas Doornbos
Forwards
(Australia) Jackson Gallagher	(Australia) Mitchell Henning	(Australia) Ryan Johnson	(Australia) Casey Kubara
(Australia) Toby Kubara	(Australia) Tyler Kubara	(Australia) Tom Letki	(Australia) Charlie York

On 4 December 2021, the Brave defeated the Canberra Knights 7–6 in overtime after a topsy-turvy game that saw the lead switch from one team to the other each period as well as late goals. The Brave went ahead early in the game and led 3–0 at the end of the first period. The Knights staged a comeback in the second period and headed into the change rooms 4–3 up. In the third period the teams traded goals with the Knights levelling the match in 30 seconds left on the clock through former Brave captain, Jordie Gavin's top shelf shot beating Alexandre Tetreault. In the 3v3 overtime period, both teams played strategic hockey and it was the Brave who scored the game-winning goal through Casey Kubara.
