= Sydney Ice Dogs =

- City: Sydney
- League: Australian Ice Hockey League
- Conference: Hellyer
- Founded: 2002 (24 years ago)
- Operated: 2002–present
- Home arena: Macquarie Ice Rink
- Colours: Navy, burgundy, white
- General manager: (Australia) Paul Kelly
- Head coach: (Australia) Jason Kvisle
- Captain: (Australia) Daniel Pataky
- Website: icedogs.theaihl.com

Franchise history
- 2002–2008: Western Sydney Ice Dogs
- 2009–present: Sydney Ice Dogs

Championships
- H Newman Reid Trophies: 1 (2013)
- Goodall Cups: 2 (2004, 2013)

The Sydney Ice Dogs (formally Western Sydney Ice Dogs) is an Australian ice hockey team from Sydney. Formed in 2002, the Ice Dogs are a member of the Australian Ice Hockey League (AIHL). The Ice Dogs are two time Goodall Cup champions.

== History ==
=== Foundation blocks ===
Top level ice hockey in Western Sydney dates back to 1981. The Blacktown Flyers were a foundation member of the New South Wales Superleague (NSWSL), playing out of Blacktown Ice Arena. Following the closure of the Warringah Ice Skating Rink in the '90s, NSWSL powerhouse, Warringah Bombers relocated to Blacktown. Blacktown in-turn withdrew support for the Flyers and a semi-private owned team, the Blacktown Bullets, were founded and joined the league in place of the Flyers. In 1993 the NSWSL's collapsed and Blacktown joined the newly formed East Coast Super League (ECSL) in 1994 and competed in the ECSL until its own demise in 1999. The Australian Ice Hockey League (AIHL) started in 2000. The Bullets did not join the new league, so for the first time in nineteen years, Western Sydney did not have a representative team in the top level of Australian hockey. Western Sydney's next chance came in 2002 when the AIHL decided to expand the league from three to six teams.

=== Western Sydney era ===
The Sydney Ice Dogs was established in 2002 as the Western Sydney Ice Dogs and entered the AIHL for the 2002 season. The Ice Dogs joined the league along with fellow expansion teams, Melbourne Ice and Newcastle North Stars. The Ice Dogs were the second Sydney based franchise to join the league, following foundation team, the Sydney Bears. The team was assembled and funded by John Wilson, owner of the Blacktown Ice Arena, and his son Anthony Wilson. The geneses of the Ice Dogs team came from the former Blacktown Bullets. Chris Sekura was named inaugural Ice Dogs captain.

The Ice Dog's first AIHL season saw the team finish mid-table in third place, just missing out on the championship final match for the top two teams. Slovak, Branislav Kronika, top scored for the Ice Dogs with twenty five points.

In 2003, the league introduced a new finals format that included the top four teams from the final league table, facing off in semi-finals and then the Goodall Cup final. The Ice Dogs reached the finals weekend in 2003 after finishing fourth in the regular season. They won their semi-final, defeating the league premiers, Adelaide Avalanche, 4–1. In the team's first appearance in the Goodall Cup final, the Ice Dogs were defeated by the Newcastle North Stars 1–4.

In 2004, the Ice Dogs went one better and claimed the AIHL championship and the Goodall Cup for the first time in the team's history. They matched-up against the dominant Northstars. Newcastle had won all but one match in the regular season, in the Final for the second season in a row but this time they defeated them 3–1.

October 2007, the Blacktown Ice Arena closed down leaving the Ice Dogs without a rink for the 2008 season. The Ice Dogs moved to Baulkham Hills and played out of the Sydney Ice Arena for one season as they looked for a new home. During 2008, the Ice Dogs finished the regular season runner-up and qualified for finals after missing out the year before. Western Sydney defeated the Melbourne Ice in the semi-finals in overtime before coming up against Newcastle for the third time in a Goodall Cup (championship) final. In a score line replicating the 2003 final, the North Stars ran out a 1–4 victory over the Ice Dogs thanks in large part to the individual exploits of Mickey Gilchrist.

=== Sydney era ===
In 2009, the Ice Dogs underwent a team re-brand, changing their name to the Sydney Ice Dogs, changing colours to teal, orange and white and updating their digital platforms. The Ice Dogs also moved to their new home in Liverpool at the Liverpool Catholic Club Ice Rink.

In 2010, Australia's first ever National Hockey League player, Nathan Walker, made his debut for the Sydney Ice Dogs. Walker's debut came in a 6–2 loss at Liverpool Catholic Club Ice Rink against Ice Dog's rivals Newcastle North Stars. Walker got an assist in the match for a total of one point. Nathan Walker played a total of seven matches for the Ice Dogs during the 2010 and 2011 seasons. He broke up his calendar year between playing U18 hockey in the Czech Republic and senior hockey for the Ice Dogs in the AIHL. His time with the Ice Dogs culminated with his selection for the Australian national team (the Mightyroos) for the World Championships Division 2 in 2011, which was hosted in Melbourne at the Icehouse. The Mightyroos, along with Walker, went on to top their group and win gold and promotion to Division 1 for the following year. Walker was selected by Australia's head coach, former Ice Dog Vlad Rubes, as the team's MVP for the tournament.

The Ice Dogs next success came in the 2013 season. The Ice Dogs won the H Newman Reid Trophy for the first time by finishing top of the regular season table. The team reached the Goodall Cup final and met Newcastle for the fourth time in the team's history. The Ice Dogs defeated the North Stars 6–3 to claim the team's second Goodall Cup. Australian national team goaltender, Anthony Kimlin led the team to the title and was named finals MVP.

Following their 2013 success, the Ice Dogs won their first Wilson Cup in the pre-season NSW cup for 2014. A 4–2 victory in the cup final over the Newcastle North Stars at Sydney Ice Arena secured the cup. The Ice Dogs were then shocked in April ahead of the new season. On 14 April, Ron Kuprowsky and his two assistants, Colin Downie and Brad Andrlon, all abruptly tendered their resignations with the Ice Dogs. In May 2014, experienced head coach, Andrew Petrie, was announced the new Ice Dogs head coach. Under Petrie the Ice Dogs finished fourth in the league and reached the finals for the fourth season in a row. The Ice Dogs were defeated by eventual winner, the Melbourne Mustangs in the semi-finals held at Melbourne Icehouse, Melbourne. At the conclusion of the season Petrie left the team with one season remaining on his contract to take up the vacant position at AIHL and NSW rival, Newcastle North Stars.

In 2015, the Ice Dogs went through a season of upheaval. For undisclosed reasons the team moved two home matches against the CBR Brave away from Liverpool to Phillip Ice Skating Centre, Canberra. There was a mass shakeup of the player roster with a number of veteran team stalwarts leaving. The Ice Dogs iced a lot of junior players in 2015 under the guidance of former Oman national team head coach, Anders Jespersen, and from the middle of June, Mario Passarelli and Tim Flynn. On the ice, the Ice Dogs suffered, losing 27 out of 28 matches. This included six matches where the opposition scored more than ten goals. The ice Dogs did defeat the Sydney Bears in a shootout on 13 June 2015 to claim their only win and points of the season, however, due to multiple breaches in the number of players travelled with, the Ice Dogs were penalised by the AIHL and had three competition points taken away, leaving the Ice Dogs on 0 points at the end of the season.

In 2016 the Ice Dogs began to form a new direction for the team. Interim head coach, Tim Flynn took over as general manager in the offseason before a permanent new general manager was announced on 3 March 2016. Former Ice Dogs player, Jason Juba became the new GM and he was keen to re-connect the team to its roots and its early years form. The Ice Dogs then appointed former player, Vlad Rubes as new head coach. While a number of former players re-joined the Ice Dogs including, Tomas Manco, David Dunwoodie, Andrew White and Scott and Todd Stephenson. New team president, Chris Blagg, resurrected the Matt Clark Shield Match. The Matt Clark Shield was formally hosted by Blaggs former club, the Warringah Bombers and contested between 1995 and 2001 to fundraise for leukaemia research. Matt Clark was a former Bombers and national youth team player who died in 1995 from leukaemia. The Ice Dogs won the 2016 Matt Clark Shield match, nine goals to eight, against the Adelaide Adrenaline.

In 2017, the Ice Dogs celebrated their fifteen-year anniversary. To mark the milestone the team produced a special edition logo and a retro style playing kit that was modelled on the Warringah Bombers. The Ice Dogs also brought back their original colour scheme of blue, burgundy and white. Negotiations had occurred between team president, Chris Blagg, and general manager, Jason Juba, and the newly renovated Macquarie Ice Rink in the off season that resulted in a deal that ended the Ice Dogs time in Liverpool and Western Sydney and moved the team to Sydney's Northern Suburbs in Macquarie. For the first time the Ice Dogs would share a home with Sydney rivals the Bears. Ice Dogs president, Chris Blagg was then appointed as head coach and he steered the team to their best finish since 2014, fifth place, one spot outside of qualification for finals.

In 2018, the Ice Dogs once again had a new head coach. Andrew Petrie was appointed for the second time, having last coached the team in 2014. The Ice Dogs lost their GM with Jason Juba stepping down from his role at the team to focus on family and business ventures. Juba was credited with rebuilding the team over the previous two seasons. The Ice Dogs also secured the services of 2015 AIHL MVP, Geordie Wudrick to bolster the scoring power of the team. Wudrick had previously spent one season with the North Stars and two seasons with the Brave. The Ice Dogs pushed for a finals birth but they lost to the Mustangs in the final match of the regular season and missed out on qualification by one point. The Dogs did find success in the Wilson Cup, claiming the trophy for the second time and the first time in the new configuration of the Battle for Sydney (whoever wins the head-to-head in the regular season between the Ice Dogs and Bears.

In 2019, the team again challenged for finals but came up just short, finishing the season in sixth place. Ice Dogs' British forward, Tim Crowder, finished the season as the top point scorer in the league with 77 points while Canadian defenceman, Dylan Quaile, was named AIHL MVP and Defenceman of the Year after posting 63 points from 26 matches.

== Season-by-season results ==
Sydney Ice Dogs all-time record
Season	Regular season											Finals									Wilson Cup	Top points scorer
Season	P	W	T	L	OW	OL	GF	GA	GD	Pts	Finish	P	W	L	GF	GA	Result	Preliminary Final	Semi-final	Goodall Cup Final	Wilson Cup	Name	Points
2002	20	12	1	7	–	–	93	81	+12	25	3rd	–									–	(Slovakia) Branislav Kronika	25
2003^{1}	18	10	1	8	–	–	90	64	+26	21	4th	2	1	1	5	5	Runner-up	–	Won 4–1 (Avalanche)	Lost 1–4 (North Stars)	–	(Australia) Christopher Sekura	12
2004	20	11	–	7	–	2	92	71	+21	35	2nd	2	2	–	8	5	Champions	–	Won 5–4 (Bears)	Won 3–1 (North Stars)	–	(Slovakia) Martin Jesko	40
2005	26	11	1	10	2	2	105	110	−5	40	3rd	1	–	1	2	5	Semi-finalist	–	Lost 2–5 (North Stars)	–	–	(Australia) Alex Djamirze	34
2006	28	18	–	9	1	–	95	82	+13	56	3rd	1	–	1	2	5	Semi-finalist	–	Lost 2–5 (Avalanche)	–	–	(Canada) Cameron Kuzyk	36
2007	28	10	–	10	7	1	105	93	+12	42	6th	–									Group	(Canada) Jimmy Gagnon	31
2008	28	15	–	8	4	1	126	91	+35	54	2nd	2	1	1	3	5	Runner-up	–	Won 2–1 (Ice)	Lost 1–4 (North Stars)	Runner-up	(Canada) Tyler Sheddon	38
2009	24	10	–	11	1	2	87	90	−3	34	5th	–									Runner-up	(Canada) Jassi Sangha	37
2010	24	4	–	17	–	3	74	120	−46	15	7th	–									–	(Canada) Derek Campbell	21
2011	28	17	–	9	2	–	124	90	+34	55	3rd	1	–	1	2	5	Semi-finalist	–	Lost 2–5 (North Stars)	–	–	(United States) Matt Monaghan	34
2012	24	12	–	9	1	2	96	99	−3	40	2nd, Bauer	1	–	1	2	6	Semi-finalist	–	Lost 2–6 (Ice)	–	–	(United States) Casey Mignone	46
2013	28	18	–	6	3	1	117	80	+37	61	1st	2	2	–	10	5	Champions	–	Won 4–2 (Ice)	Won 6–3 (North Stars)	–	(Canada) Simon Barg	55
2014	28	14	–	11	2	1	116	97	+19	47	4th	1	–	1	4	6	Semi-finalist	–	Lost 4–6 (Mustangs)	–	Winner	(Canada) Simon Barg	69
2015	28	0	–	27	1	–	39	209	−170	0^{2}	8th	–									Group	(Canada) Strat Allen	12
2016	28	7	–	19	1	1	92	139	−47	24	7th	–									Runner-up	(Canada) Strat Allen	43
2017	28	12	–	16	–	–	73	81	−8	36	5th	–									Runner-up	(Canada) Grant Toulmin	42
2018	28	10	–	13	3	2	96	97	−1	38	6th	–									Winner	(Canada) Geordie Wudrick	56
2019	28	10	–	14	1	3	122	128	−6	35	6th	–									Runner-up	(Canada) Tim Crowder	77
2020	2020 and 2021 AIHL seasons were cancelled and not contested
2021	2020 and 2021 AIHL seasons were cancelled and not contested
2022	20	3	–	17	–	–	66	145	−79	9	6th	–									Runner-up	(Australia) Strat Allen	26
2023	26	7	–	17	–	2	104	159	−55	23	8th	–									Runner-up	(Canada) Grant Toulmin	49
2024	30	9	–	17	3	1	112	145	−33	34	8th	–									Runner-up	(Canada) Alex Macdonald	58
2025	Withdrew from season due to Macquarie Ice Rink renovations
2026	–	–	–	–	–	–	–	–	–	–	–	–	–	–	–	–	–	–	–	–	Winner	–	–
Totals	542	221	3	262	32	24	2030	2274	-244			13	6	7	38	47

^{1} 2003 AIHL season statistics are incomplete. No one source has all the information and the AIHL has not published official statistics on www.theaihl.com
^{2} The Ice Dogs were fined three competition points for multiple breaches by-law 4 which requires teams to travel with at least 15 players unless an exemption has been granted.

Champions	Runners-up	Third place

== Championships ==
- Goodall Cup

(gold) Champions (2): 2004, 2013
(silver) Runners-up (2): 2003, 2008

- H Newman Reid Trophy (2008–Current)

(gold) Premiers (1): 2013
(silver) Runners-up (2): 2008, 2012

- V.I.P. Cup (2004–07)

(gold) Premiers (0):
(silver) Runners-up (1): 2004

== Players ==
=== Current roster ===
Team roster for the 2026 AIHL season.

Sydney Ice Dogs roster - 2026 AIHL season
Active roster		Inactive roster	Coaching staff
Goaltenders: 1 (Australia) Justin Baxter; 55 (Australia) Gabriel Robledo; 88 (Canada) Ryan Burroughs; Defencemen: 2 (Australia) Steven Adams; 4 (Canada) Ian MacLean (I); 5 (Australia) Daniel Pataky (C); 8 (Australia) Jacob Laver; 17 (Australia) Matt Musumeci; 23 (Australia) David Quinn; 26 (Australia) Braden Costa; 37 (Canada) Luke Bradley; 44 (Australia) Marcus Hosen; 77 (New Zealand) CJ Kemp; 94 (Canada) David D'Agostino (I); 97 (Canada) Kabore Dunn (I)	Forwards: 10 (Hungary) Natan Vertes (I); 13 (Australia) Stepan Olkin; 15 (Australia) Jeremy Vasquez; 16 (Australia) Ivan Kuleshov; 18 (Australia) Thomas Moncrieff; 19 (Australia) Strat Allen (A); 22 (Australia) Max Miller; 23 (Australia) Jack Ransome; 29 (Australia) Jerry Zhou; 34 (Australia) Connor Lee; 42 (Australia) Dmitri Kuleshov; 51 (Australia) Daniel Chen; 55 (Russia) Aleksandr Dvinianinov; 61 (Australia) Joseph Maatouk; 71 (England) Robert Lachowicz (I); 93 (South Korea) Jung Ahn (I)	14 (Australia) Kale Costa; 31 (Japan) Ryo Murakami (I); 60 (Canada) Shane Hanna (I); 66 (Canada) Grant Toulmin (A)	Head Coach: (Australia) Jason Kvisle; Coaches: (Australia) David Costa (AsC); (Australia) Gabriel Robledo (AC/GC); (Australia) Kylie Boyd (TM); Legend (C) Captain (A) Alternate Captain (I) Import player Statistics; Average age: 27.00; Average height: 182.31 cm Average weight: 82.44 kg Locals: 25; Imports: 5
Last updated on: 15 August 2026
Elite Prospects

=== Retired numbers ===
Throughout the history of the Sydney Ice Dogs, one jersey number has been retired in honour of a former club legend.

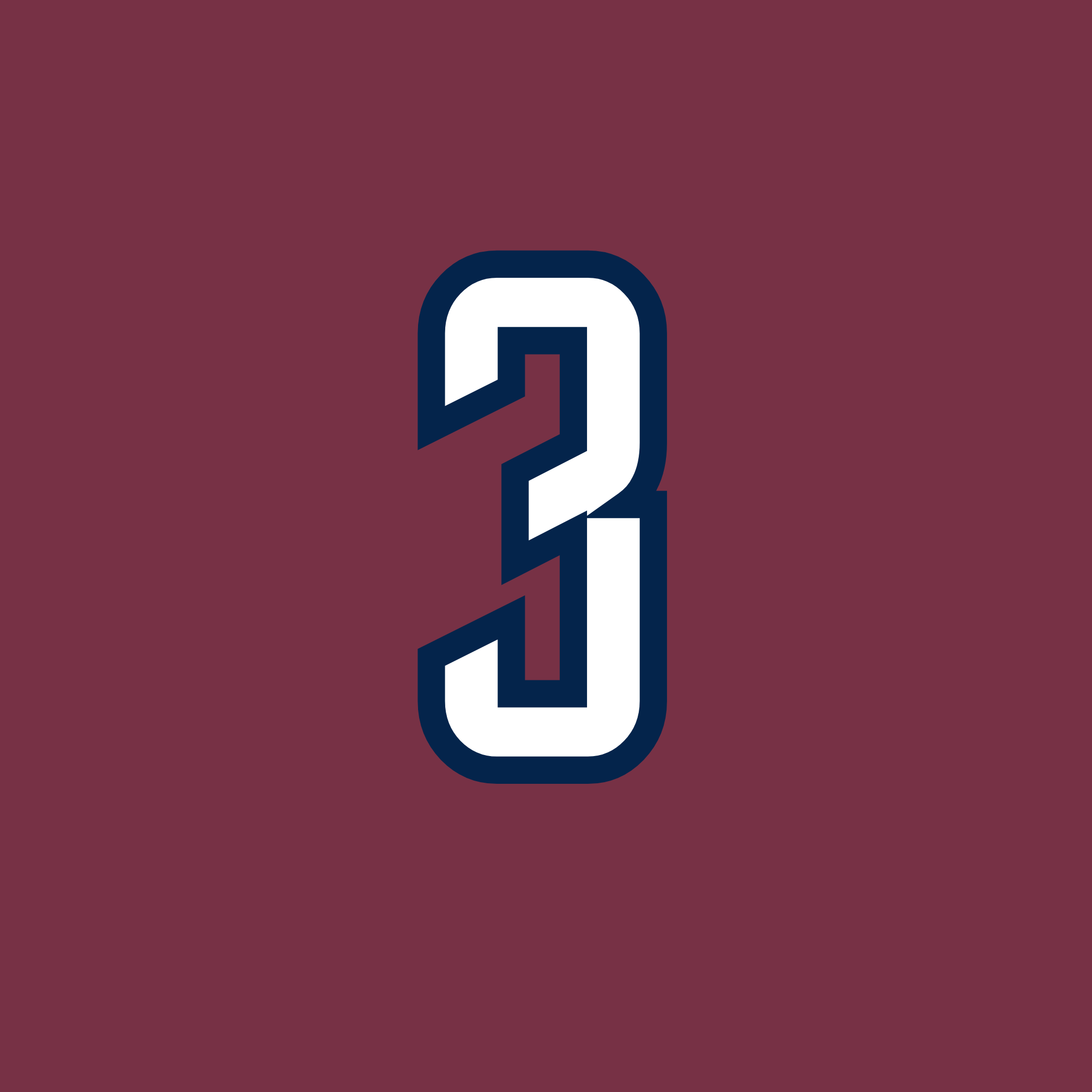
Retired number	History
	Anthony Wilson – # 3 (2002–2013, Defenseman); Anthony was a founding player of the Ice Dogs in 2002. He assisted his father, John, along with the other Blacktown Bullets players, set up the team. Wilson, who played as a defenceman, spent over ten years playing for the Ice Dogs. He captained the team as well as Australia during his time with the Ice Dogs. Anthony was an instrumental part of the 2004 season Goodall Cup champions Ice Dogs team. Following his playing retirement he has held different roles at the Ice Dogs including general manager and Defensive coach. On 23 August 2019, The Ice Dogs officially retired Wilson's number three jersey in a ceremony prior to an AIHL match against Sydney Bears at Macquarie Ice Rink.

=== Player records ===
These are the top-ten all-time player records in franchise history for the following categories: Appearances, Goals, Assists, Points, Penalty minutes
(Figures are updated after each completed AIHL regular season)

As of 2023 season

All-time Appearances
#	Name	Pos	GP
1	(Australia) David Dunwoodie	D	309
2	(Australia) Todd Stephenson	F	297
3	(Australia) Shannon McGregor	D	293
4	(Australia) Tomas Manco	D	268
5	(Australia) Scott Stephenson	F	257
6	(Australia) Andrew White	D	234
7	(Australia) Anthony Wilson	D	195
8	(Australia) Daniel Pataky	F	182
9	(Australia) Alec Stephenson	F	180
10	(Australia) Billy Cliff	F	179

All-time Goals
#	Name	Pos	G
1	(Canada) Grant Toulmin	F	93
2	(Australia) David Dunwoodie	D	79
3	(Canada) Strat Allen	F	73
4	(Australia) Scott Stephenson	F	71
5	(Australia) Todd Stephenson	F	70
6	(Australia) Andrew White	D	57
7	(United States) Matt Monaghan	F	55
8	(Australia) Alex D'Jamirze	F	53
9	(Canada) Simon Barg	F	49
10	(Australia) Chris Sekura	F	46

All-time Assists
#	Name	Pos	A
1	(Canada) Grant Toulmin	F	159
2	(Australia) David Dunwoodie	D	141
3	(Australia) Todd Stephenson	F	131
4	(Australia) Scott Stephenson	F	89
5	(Australia) Andrew White	D	85
6	(Australia) Chris Sekura	F	79
7	(Australia) Anthony Wilson	D	79
8	(Canada) Strat Allen	F	76
9	(Canada) Simon Barg	F	75
10	(Saskatchewan) Tomas Manco	D	68

All-time Points
#	Name	Pos	Pts
1	(Canada) Grant Toulmin	F	252
2	(Australia) David Dunwoodie	D	220
3	(Australia) Todd Stephenson	F	201
4	(Australia) Scott Stephenson	F	160
5	(Canada) Strat Allen	F	149
6	(Australia) Andrew White	D	142
7	(Australia) Chris Sekura	F	125
8	(Canada) Simon Barg	F	124
9	(Australia) Anthony Wilson	D	107
10	(Australia) Alex D'Jamirze	F	104

All-time Penalties
#	Name	Pos	PIM
1	(Australia) David Dunwoodie	D	1324
2	(Australia) Andrew White	D	1147
3	(Australia) Todd Stephenson	F	703
4	(Australia) Chris Sekura	F	553
5	(Australia) Shannon McGregor	D	519
6	(Australia) Anthony Wilson	D	462
7	(Australia) Tomas Manco	D	445
8	(Australia) Alec Stephenson	F	418
9	(Australia) Scott Stephenson	F	384
10	(Australia) Billy Cliff	F	354

Legend:

Active Ice Dogs player

== Club staff ==
Current as of 2024 AIHL season.

Ice Dogs staff
Role	Name
Head coach	(Australia) Jason Kvisle
Assistant coach	(Australia) David Costa
Assistant coach	(Saskatchewan) Tomas Manco
Team manager	(Australia) Kylie Boyd
Equipment manager	(Australia) Daniel Boyd
Equipment manager	(Australia) Richard Stevens
Medic	(Australia) Annelie Kvisle
Governor	(Australia) Angela Brown
President	(Australia) Paul Kelly

== Team identity ==
=== Name and colours ===
The Ice Dogs have gone through one change in name since inception in 2002. The team was originally known as the Western Sydney Ice Dogs but dropped the 'Western' part of their name in 2009 and became the Sydney Ice Dogs. The team at the time remained located in Western Sydney but local rivals, the Bears, had moved further west in 2007 to Penrith and had dropped Sydney from their name. The Ice Dogs were the only team in the AIHL in 2009 known as Sydney.

Name history
#	Name	Term
1	Western Sydney Ice Dogs	2002–08
2	Sydney Ice Dogs	2009–present

Sydney Ice Dogs currently identify with a navy, burgundy and white colour scheme.

The Ice Dogs came into the AIHL with the colour scheme of navy, burgundy and white. When the team partnered with Naming Rights Sponsor Reach Crane Trucks in 2009, the Ice Dogs changed colours to Reach colours teal, orange and white. The Ice Dogs kept this colour scheme till the end of 2016. With the move to Macquarie, and the fifteenth anniversary of the team, the Ice Dogs re-branded for the second time and reverted their colour scheme back to the original navy, burgundy and white.

=== Facilities ===
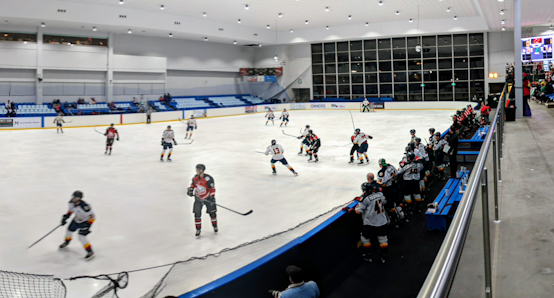
Macquarie Ice Rink, ice Dog's home since 2017

The Ice Dogs are currently based at Macquarie Ice Rink, inside the Macquarie Centre in Sydney's Northern Suburbs. The Macquarie facility consists of an Olympic sized rink (60m x 30m) with seating for approximately 2,000 people. The Ice Dogs have been in Macquarie since 2017. Prior to moving to Macquarie the Ice Dogs had been based in three different locations around Western Sydney. The Ice Dogs began life at Blacktown Ice Arena, Blacktown. They called Blacktown home until the family run and owned ice rink closed in October 2007. In 2008 the Ice Dogs moved to Baulkham Hills and played out of the Sydney Ice Arena. The team's stay in Baulkham Hills was short lived however, as they again moved in 2009 to Liverpool and the Liverpool Catholic Club Ice Rink. The Ice Dogs remained in Liverpool for eight years, playing their last season at the rink in 2016, prior to agreeing to move to Macquarie in 2017.

Stadium history
Rink	Location	Term
Blacktown Ice Arena	Blacktown	2002–07
Sydney Ice Arena	Baulkham Hills	2008
Liverpool Catholic Club Ice Rink	Liverpool	2009–16
Macquarie Ice Rink	Macquarie	2017–present

=== Rivalries ===
Sydney Bears

This cross-town rivalry is widely regarded as the oldest and most heated matchup in the Australian Ice Hockey League. Dating back to the league's early years, the rivalry is shaped by a strong geographic divide within Sydney and a long history of physical, emotionally charged contests. Games are typically fast, aggressive, and played with a heightened edge, often featuring elevated penalty totals and vocal crowds. The fixture remains a defining part of the AIHL calendar, driven by deep-rooted familiarity, local pride, and an ongoing battle for supremacy within the big city. In 2026, with Sydney's return to the AIHL and after major renovations to the rink, the Ice Dogs played the rinks first home game against the Bears in a packed arena beating them for the first time in 8 years.

Melbourne Mustangs

The Melbourne Mustangs share a physical and hard-fought rivalry with the Sydney Ice Dogs in the Australian Ice Hockey League. The rivalry is defined by a shared identity built on grit and physical play, with both teams often embracing an underdog mentality. Games are typically aggressive and high-tempo, frequently featuring elevated penalty counts and momentum swings. The matchup has developed a reputation for intensity, driven by the competitive edge and similar playing styles of both sides.

=== Charitable work ===
Since 2016, the Ice Dogs have been raising money annually for leukaemia research through the Matt Clark Shield match. Each season the Ice Dogs pick a match during the AIHL regular season to contest for the shield and raise money for the Leukaemia Foundation of Australia. Team president, Chris Blagg, resurrected the Matt Clark Shield Match in 2016. The Shield was formally contested between 1995 and 2001 by Blagg's former club, the Warringah Bombers. Matt Clark was a former Bombers and national youth team player who died in 1995 from leukaemia at the age of 17.

Matt Clark Shield match history (2016–present)
Date	Venue	Away	Res.	Home	Raised	Ref.
6 August 2016	Liverpool Ice Rink	Adelaide Adrenaline	8–9	Sydney Ice Dogs	$5,000	Ref
1 July 2017	Macquarie Ice Rink	Perth Thunder	3–5	Sydney Ice Dogs	$10,000	Ref
4 August 2018	Macquarie Ice Rink	CBR Brave	6–3	Sydney Ice Dogs	$11,170	Ref
13 July 2019	Macquarie Ice Rink	Adelaide Adrenaline	1–10	Sydney Ice Dogs	$1,856	Ref
9 July 2022	Macquarie Ice Rink	Newcastle Northstars	6–3	Sydney Ice Dogs	$2,302	Ref
16 July 2023	Macquarie Ice Rink	Melbourne Mustangs	5–2	Sydney Ice Dogs	$2,718.5	Ref
29 June 2024	Macquarie Ice Rink	Adelaide Adrenaline	1–3	Sydney Ice Dogs	$15,000+	Ref Ref

== Leaders ==
=== Team captains ===
The Ice Dogs have had ten captains in the team's known history.

No.	Name	Term
1	(Australia) Chris Sekura	2002–03
2	(Australia) Anthony Wilson	2005
3	(Canada) Mike Tobin	2006
4	(Australia) Brett Thomas	2007–08
5	(Australia) Anthony Wilson	2009–11
6	(Australia) Andrew White	2012
7	(United States) Robert Malloy	2013–14
8	(Australia) Brian Funes	2015
9	(Australia) Scott Stephenson	2016–18
10	(Saskatchewan) Tomas Manco	2019–21
11	(Australia) Daniel Pataky	2022–present

=== Head coaches ===
The Ice Dogs have had eleven different head coaches and one interim head coach in the team's history.

No.	Name	Term
1	(Australia) Dion Dunwoodie	2002–04
2	(Canada) Kristofer Gailloux (player-coach)	2005
3	(Canada) Dan Walker	2006
4	(Australia) Anthony Wilson (player-coach)	2007
5	(Australia) Mark Stephenson	2008–10
6	(Australia) Ron Kuprowsky	2011–13
7	(Australia) Andrew Petrie	2014
8	(Denmark) Anders Jespersen	2015
9	(United States) Mario Passarelli (interim)	2015
10	(Australia) Vladimir Rubes	2016
11	(Australia) Christopher Blagg	2017
12	(Australia) Andrew Petrie	2018–21
13	(Czech Republic) Ondrej Cervenka	2022
14	(Australia) Jason Kvisle	2023–present

== Broadcasting ==
Current:

- AIHL.TV (2023–present) – Worldwide paid subscription-based online video broadcasting published by the AIHL in partnership with the Clutch.TV platform using local production companies at each team's rink. The service went live in April 2023, and would cover every AIHL regular season and finals games live and on demand.
- Sportradar (2022–present) – International online video broadcasting in North America and Europe as part of a league-wide 3-year deal signed in March 2022 in the lead up to the 2022 AIHL season.

Former:

- Kayo Sports (2022) – Domestic online video broadcasting in Australia as part of the league wide deal struck in the lead up to the 2022 AIHL season to show every AIHL game live.
- Fox Sports (2013–2019) – Part of the entire AIHL domestic TV broadcasting deal with Fox Sports to show one game a round, normally on Thursday's at 4:30 pm or after NHL games during NHL season.
- DGB Media Group (2015) – On 9 January 2015 the Ice Dogs announced that DGB will produce a half-hour highlights program for all Ice Dogs home games for the 2015 AIHL season that will be televised free-to-air on TVS (Television Sydney) Channel 44.
- Self-broadcast (2017–2019) – The Sydney Ice Dogs self-broadcast all home matches with an online audio stream using the Mixlr platform.
