= 2010 AIHL season =

- League: Australian Ice Hockey League
- Sport: Ice hockey
- Duration: 24 April 2010 – 29 August 2010

Regular season
- H Newman Reid Trophy: Newcastle North Stars (3rd title)
- Season MVP: Greg Oddy (Adrenaline)
- Top scorer: Brian Bales (81 points) (North Stars)

Goodall Cup
- Champions: Melbourne Ice
- Runners-up: Adelaide Adrenaline
- Finals MVP: Jason Baclig (Ice)

AIHL seasons
- ← 2009 2011 →

The 2010 AIHL season was the 11th season of the Australian Ice Hockey League (AIHL). It also marked the 10th Anniversary since the league’s inception in 2000. The league ran from 24 April 2010 until 22 August 2010, with the Goodall Cup finals following on 28 and 29 August 2010. The Newcastle North Stars won the H Newman Reid Trophy after finishing the regular season first in the league standings. Melbourne Ice won the Goodall Cup for the first time by defeating the defending champions Adelaide Adrenaline in the final.

== Teams ==
In 2010 the AIHL had 7 teams competing in the league.

2010 AIHL teams
Team	City	Arena	Head Coach	Captain
Adelaide Adrenaline	(South Australia) Adelaide	IceArenA	(United States) Mike Gainer	(Australia) Greg Oddy
Canberra Knights	(Australian Capital Territory) Canberra	Phillip Ice Skating Centre	(United States) David Rogina	(Australia) Mark Rummukainen
Gold Coast Blue Tongues	(Queensland) Gold Coast	Iceworld Boondall	(Australia) Kevin Sands	(Australia) Ross Howell
Melbourne Ice	(Victoria (state)) Melbourne	Medibank Icehouse	(Australia) Paul Watson	(Australia) Lliam Webster
Newcastle North Stars	(New South Wales) Newcastle	Hunter Ice Skating Stadium	(Australia) Don Champagne	(Australia) Robert Starke
Sydney Bears	(New South Wales) Penrith	Penrith Ice Palace	(Australia) Vladimir Rubes	(Australia) Michael Schlamp
Sydney Ice Dogs	(New South Wales) Sydney	Liverpool Catholic Club Ice Rink	(Australia) Mark Stephenson	(Australia) Anthony Wilson

== League business ==
During the off-season, the AIHL held its AGM where four board positions were filled following the retirement of three members. Chairman, Tim Frampton, was re-elected. The AGM agenda included the new stadium for Melbourne, scheduling, sponsorship, and referee management for the 2010 season. Other topics included IHA relations and a proposed new team from Brisbane. The AIHL Bears renamed to the Sydney Bears. The team was previously known as the Sydney Bears between 1997 and 2007.

In January, the AIHL released the season schedule. Seven teams would compete in eighty-four matches between April and August. The opening round of the season would kick off on the Anzac Day Weekend.

In February, the new ice sports stadium in Melbourne was opened. Named the Icehouse, the new stadium boasts two Olympic-sized ice rinks and is the third rink in Australia to be fully glassed. The new facility is the home of the Olympic Winter Institute of Australia. In late February it was announced the Melbourne Ice would relocate to the new stadium in Docklands from the Olympic Ice Skating Centre, Oakleigh South.

In March, the AIHL announced a change to how the Finals host would be selected. Rather than a combined member and board vote, the hosting rights would be put up for open tender. The League also welcomed back the Goodall Cup after a one year absence. Ice Hockey Australia made the request for the league to take back the Cup and the organisation voted to restore the Goodall Cup as the Championship winning prize for the AIHL. The newly minted AIHL Champions Trophy was renamed and re-purposed by the AIHL to become the H Newman Reid Trophy and would be handed to the regular season premiers. 2009 AIHL Champions, the Adelaide Adrenaline, were etched into the Goodall Cup.

During the season, the Gold Coast Blue Tongues signed an agreement with the Southern Stars Ice Hockey Club to play two home games in Brisbane at the olympic sized Acacia Ridge ice rink. AIHL Vice President Joshua Puls tendered his resignation citing an over commitment with Victoria's disadvantaged communities and a perceived conflict of interest after accepting an appointment as Patron of the Melbourne Ice as his reasons for the decision. The Sydney Ice Dogs also announced the launch of Ice Dogs TV featuring highlights from 2010 Ice Dogs home games as well as player interviews and other content. In July, the league announced the new Melbourne Icehouse had been selected from the tender and would be the host venue for the 2010 Finals series.

== Regular season ==
=== April ===
Game	Date	Time	Away	Score	Home	Location	Attendance	Recap
1	24 April	17:00	Melbourne Ice	4 – 5 (SO)	Newcastle North Stars	Newcastle	900	
2	24 April	17:30	Sydney Bears	5–3	Canberra Knights	Canberra		
3	25 April	17:00	Melbourne Ice	3–4	Sydney Bears	Penrith		

=== May ===
Game	Date	Time	Away	Score	Home	Location	Attendance	Recap
4	1 May	16:00	Canberra Knights	5–6	Gold Coast Blue Tongues	Gold Coast		
5	1 May	17:00	Newcastle North Stars	7 – 6 (SO)	Sydney Bears	Penrith	60	
6	1 May	17:45	Sydney Ice Dogs	1–4	Melbourne Ice	Melbourne	1100	
7	2 May	15:30	Sydney Ice Dogs	2 – 3 (SO)	Adelaide Adrenaline	Adelaide		
8	2 May	16:00	Canberra Knights	6–4	Gold Coast Blue Tongues	Brisbane		
9	8 May	17:30	Sydney Ice Dogs	3–8	Canberra Knights	Canberra		
10	8 May	17:45	Sydney Bears	2–9	Melbourne Ice	Melbourne		
11	9 May	15:30	Sydney Bears	1–14	Adelaide Adrenaline	Adelaide		
12	9 May	17:00	Sydney Ice Dogs	6 – 7 (SO)	Newcastle North Stars	Newcastle	700	
13	15 May	16:00	Adelaide Adrenaline	1–5	Gold Coast Blue Tongues	Gold Coast		
14	15 May	17:00	Sydney Bears	2–1	Sydney Ice Dogs	Liverpool		
15	15 May	17:30	Melbourne Ice	5–1	Canberra Knights	Canberra		
16	16 May	16:00	Adelaide Adrenaline	3–6	Gold Coast Blue Tongues	Gold Coast		
17	16 May	17:00	Melbourne Ice	9–2	Sydney Ice Dogs	Liverpool		
18	16 May	17:00	Newcastle North Stars	2–3	Sydney Bears	Penrith		
19	22 May	16:30	Sydney Ice Dogs	5–7	Adelaide Adrenaline	Adelaide		
20	22 May	17:00	Canberra Knights	2–4	Sydney Bears	Penrith		
21	23 May	16:15	Sydney Ice Dogs	0–7	Melbourne Ice	Melbourne	1000	
22	23 May	17:00	Sydney Bears	0 – 1 (SO)	Newcastle North Stars	Newcastle	800	
23	29 May	16:30	Canberra Knights	2–3	Adelaide Adrenaline	Adelaide		
24	29 May	17:00	Gold Coast Blue Tongues	1–4	Sydney Ice Dogs	Liverpool		
25	30 May	16:15	Canberra Knights	1–6	Melbourne Ice	Melbourne		
26	30 May	17:00	Gold Coast Blue Tongues	1–7	Sydney Bears	Penrith		

=== June ===
Game	Date	Time	Away	Score	Home	Location	Attendance	Recap
27	5 June	16:00	Sydney Ice Dogs	2–5	Gold Coast Blue Tongues	Gold Coast		
28	5 June	17:00	Adelaide Adrenaline	3 – 4 (SO)^{[I]}	Newcastle North Stars	Newcastle		
29	5 June	17:30	Sydney Bears	4–3	Canberra Knights	Canberra		
30	6 June	16:00	Sydney Ice Dogs	0–3	Gold Coast Blue Tongues	Gold Coast		
31	6 June	17:00	Adelaide Adrenaline	1–2	Sydney Bears	Penrith		
32	12 June	17:00	Newcastle North Stars	6–2	Sydney Ice Dogs	Liverpool		
33	19 June	16:30	Gold Coast Blue Tongues	7 – 8 (SO)	Adelaide Adrenaline	Adelaide		
34	19 June	17:00	Melbourne Ice	5–6	Newcastle North Stars	Newcastle	700	
35	19 June	17:30	Sydney Ice Dogs	1–3	Canberra Knights	Canberra		
36	20 June	16:30	Gold Coast Blue Tongues	2–5	Adelaide Adrenaline	Adelaide		
37	20 June	17:00	Melbourne Ice	1–4	Sydney Bears	Penrith		
38	26 June	17:00	Gold Coast Blue Tongues	5–3	Sydney Ice Dogs	Liverpool		
39	26 June	17:30	Newcastle North Stars	6–2	Canberra Knights	Canberra		
40	26 June	17:45	Adelaide Adrenaline	6–4	Melbourne Ice	Melbourne		
41	27 June	16:15	Adelaide Adrenaline	0–2	Melbourne Ice	Melbourne		
42	27 June	17:00	Gold Coast Blue Tongues	4–2	Sydney Bears	Penrith		

=== July ===
Game	Date	Time	Away	Score	Home	Location	Attendance	Recap
43	3 July	16:00	Melbourne Ice	5–4	Gold Coast Blue Tongues	Gold Coast		
44	3 July	17:00	Newcastle North Stars	7–3	Sydney Ice Dogs	Liverpool		
45	3 July	17:30	Adelaide Adrenaline	5 – 4 (SO)^{[I]}	Canberra Knights	Canberra		
46	4 July	16:00	Melbourne Ice	4–2	Gold Coast Blue Tongues	Brisbane		
47	4 July	17:00	Adelaide Adrenaline	3 – 2 (SO)	Sydney Ice Dogs	Liverpool		
48	4 July	17:00	Canberra Knights	5–7	Newcastle North Stars	Newcastle	700	
49	10 July	16:00	Sydney Bears	2–4	Gold Coast Blue Tongues	Gold Coast		
50	10 July	17:45	Newcastle North Stars	2–9	Melbourne Ice	Melbourne		
51	10 July	17:00	Canberra Knights	7–8	Sydney Ice Dogs	Liverpool		
52	11 July	16:30	Newcastle North Stars	3–1	Adelaide Adrenaline	Adelaide		
53	11 July	16:00	Sydney Bears	2 – 3 (SO)	Gold Coast Blue Tongues	Gold Coast		
54	17 July	16:30	Melbourne Ice	8 – 7 (SO)	Adelaide Adrenaline	Adelaide		
55	17 July	17:00	Sydney Bears	2–8	Sydney Ice Dogs	Liverpool		
56	17 July	17:30	Newcastle North Stars	6–3	Canberra Knights	Canberra		
57	18 July	16:30	Melbourne Ice	3–4	Adelaide Adrenaline	Adelaide		
58	18 July	17:00	Sydney Bears	1–6	Newcastle North Stars	Newcastle		
59	24 July	16:30	Newcastle North Stars	5 – 4 (SO)	Adelaide Adrenaline	Adelaide		
60	24 July	17:30	Gold Coast Blue Tongues	3–2	Canberra Knights	Canberra		
61	25 July	16:15	Newcastle North Stars	1 – 2 (SO)	Melbourne Ice	Melbourne		
62	25 July	17:00	Sydney Ice Dogs	2–4	Sydney Bears	Penrith		
63	25 July	17:30	Gold Coast Blue Tongues	4–5	Canberra Knights	Canberra		
64	31 July	16:00	Newcastle North Stars	3–1	Gold Coast Blue Tongues	Gold Coast		
65	31 July	17:45	Canberra Knights	0–5	Melbourne Ice	Melbourne		

=== August ===
Game	Date	Time	Away	Score	Home	Location	Attendance	Recap
66	1 August	16:00	Newcastle North Stars	8–3	Gold Coast Blue Tongues	Gold Coast		
67	1 August	16:30	Canberra Knights	5–7	Adelaide Adrenaline	Adelaide		
68	1 August	17:00	Sydney Ice Dogs	2–5	Sydney Bears	Penrith		
69	7 August	17:00	Adelaide Adrenaline	4–10	Sydney Ice Dogs	Liverpool		
70	7 August	17:00	Canberra Knights	2–12	Newcastle North Stars	Newcastle		
71	7 August	17:45	Gold Coast Blue Tongues	2–5	Melbourne Ice	Melbourne		
72	8 August	16:15	Gold Coast Blue Tongues	3–6	Melbourne Ice	Melbourne		
73	8 August	17:00	Adelaide Adrenaline	0–3	Sydney Bears	Penrith		
74	14 August	17:00	Sydney Ice Dogs	0–4	Newcastle North Stars	Newcastle	850	
75	14 August	17:30	Melbourne Ice	3 – 2 (SO)	Canberra Knights	Canberra		
76	15 August	17:00	Melbourne Ice	6–3	Sydney Ice Dogs	Liverpool		
77	15 August	17:00	Canberra Knights	0–11	Sydney Bears	Penrith		
78	21 August	16:30	Sydney Bears	5 – 4 (SO)	Adelaide Adrenaline	Adelaide		
79	21 August	17:00	Canberra Knights	2–10	Sydney Ice Dogs	Liverpool		
80	21 August	17:00	Gold Coast Blue Tongues	3–11	Newcastle North Stars	Newcastle	850	
81	22 August	16:15	Sydney Bears	3–7	Melbourne Ice	Melbourne		
82	22 August	17:00	Gold Coast Blue Tongues	3–8	Newcastle North Stars	Newcastle	800	

I Double points game.

=== Standings ===
Team	GP	W	SOW	SOL	L	GF	GA	GDF	PTS
Newcastle North Stars	24	14	7	1	2	131	74	57	57
Melbourne Ice	24	15	3	1	5	122	65	57	52
Sydney Bears	24	12	1	3	8	82	90	−8	41
Adelaide Adrenaline	24	8	5	5	6	107	92	15	39
Gold Coast Blue Tongues	24	9	1	1	13	84	107	−23	30
Canberra Knights	24	5	0	3	16	79	131	−52	18
Sydney Ice Dogs	24	4	0	3	17	74	120	−46	15

Qualified for the Goodall Cup playoffs	H Newman Reid Trophy winners

=== Statistics ===
==== Scoring leaders ====
List shows the ten top skaters sorted by points, then goals.

Player	Team	GP	G	A	Pts	PIM	POS
Peter Cartwright	Newcastle North Stars	25	41	47	88	24	F
Brian Bales	Newcastle North Stars	25	33	54	87	28	F
Blair Tassone	Newcastle North Stars	25	22	40	62	82	F
Greg Oddy	Adelaide Adrenaline	26	19	29	48	18	F
Mike McRae	Gold Coast Blue Tongues	23	17	19	46	87	F
Lliam Webster	Melbourne Ice	26	24	22	46	95	F
Jason Baclig	Melbourne Ice	23	25	20	45	10	F
Cameron Dion	Adelaide Adrenaline	24	20	24	44	67	F
Dallas Costanzo	Gold Coast Blue Tongues	23	18	26	44	63	F
Matthew Armstrong	Melbourne Ice	24	16	28	44	66	D

==== Leading goaltenders ====
Only the top five goaltenders, based on save percentage.

Player	Team	MIP	SOG	GA	GAA	SVS%	SO
Matt Ezzy	Newcastle North Stars	1023:00	763	69	3.04	91.0	2
Nick Boucher	Sydney Bears	793:10	534	49	2.78	90.8	2
Reese Kalleitner	Gold Coast Blue Tongues	393:15	336	36	4.12	89.3	0
Stuart Denman	Melbourne Ice	1020:00	518	60	2.65	88.4	2
Olivier Martin	Adelaide Adrenaline	921:00	566	73	3.57	87.1	0

== Goodall Cup playoffs ==
The playoffs were held between 28 and 29 August with all three games being played at the Icehouse in Melbourne. Melbourne Ice won the final and the Goodall Cup (1st title) after defeating the then defending champions Adelaide Adrenaline 6–4. The Ice took an early lead in the final before going behind twice. A strong finish to the match saw the Goodall Cup return to Victoria for the first time in 27 years. Melbourne Ice's Canadian born forward, Jason Baclig, was named the finals most valuable player (MVP) and was awarded the inaugural Kendall Finals MVP trophy.

Semifinals
1	Newcastle North Stars	6
4	Adelaide Adrenaline	7
3	Melbourne Ice	2
2	Sydney Bears	1

Final
Adelaide Adrenaline	4
Melbourne Ice	6

All times are UTC+10:00

=== Semi-finals ===
28 August 2010; 16:00	Newcastle North Stars	6–7 (2–4, 0–2, 4–1)	Adelaide Adrenaline	Icehouse, Melbourne; Attendance: 900

Game reference

Matthew Ezzy
Goalies
Olivier Martin
Referee:
Jeff Scott
Linesmen:
Mitchell Waters
Darren Lampard

	0 – 1	Corstens (Oddy, Greer)
	0 – 2	Oddy (PS) (unassisted)
Bales (Tassone, Cartwright)	1 – 2
	1 – 3	Mantere (Oddy, Dion)
	1 – 4	Lovdahl (PP) (Huxley, Darge)
Bales (SH) (Tassone, Belanger)	2 – 4
	2 – 5	Dion (Oddy)
	2 – 6	Peterson (Greer, Lovdahl)
	2 – 7	Clark (Huxley, Corstens)
Belanger (PP) (Cartwright, Bales)	3 – 7
Cartwright (Tassone)	4 – 7
Oultram (SH) (Tassone, Cartwright)	5 – 7
Tassone (Bales)	6 – 7

8 min
Penalties
14 min
24
Shots
26

28 August 2010; 19:30	Melbourne Ice	2–1 (0–1, 0–0, 2–0)	Sydney Bears	Icehouse, Melbourne; Attendance: 1300

Game reference

Stuart Denman
Goalies
Nick Boucher
Referee:
Gordon Young
Linesmen:
Jason Forbes
Jim McIntosh

	0 – 1	Stransky (Pelikovsky)
Webster (PP) (Armstrong, MacSweyn)	1 – 1
J.Hughes (MacSweyn, Matus)	2 – 1

6 min
Penalties
12 min
33
Shots
9

=== Final ===
29 August 2010; 16:00	Adelaide Adrenaline	4–6 (2–2, 1–2, 1–2)	Melbourne Ice	Icehouse, Melbourne; Attendance: 1500

Game reference

Olivier Martin
Goalies
Stuart Denman
Referee:
Jeff Scott
Linesmen:
Mitchell Waters
Darren Lampard

	0 – 1	J.Hughes (MacSweyn, Moore)
Oddy (SH) (Darge)	1 – 1
Dion (Harding)	2 – 1
	2 – 2	Armstrong (unassisted)
Dion (PP) (Corstens, Oddy)	3 – 2
	3 – 3	Powell (Armstrong, Baclig)
	3 – 4	J.Hughes (MacSweyn, Webster)
	3 – 5	Armstrong (Powell, Baclig)
Keane (Delsar)	4 – 5
	4 – 6	Webster (unassisted)

10 min
Penalties
16 min
25
Shots
31
