= Adelaide Adrenaline =

- City: Adelaide, South Australia
- League: Australian Ice Hockey League
- Conference: Rurak
- Founded: 1 July 2008 (18 years ago)
- Operated: 2008–present
- Home arena: Adelaide Ice Arena
- Colours: Blue, gold, white
- General manager: (Australia) Jamie Taylor
- Head coach: (Canada) Rory Rawlyk
- Captain: (Australia) Joey MacDougall
- Media: (United Kingdom) Ryan Whitford
- Website: www.adelaideadrenaline.com.au

Franchise history
- 2008: Adelaide A's
- 2009–present: Adelaide Adrenaline

Championships
- H Newman Reid Trophies: 0
- Goodall Cups: 1 (2009)

The Adelaide Adrenaline is a semi-professional ice hockey team based in Adelaide, South Australia. The team is a member of the Australian Ice Hockey League (AIHL). The team was founded in 2008 as the Adelaide A's to replace the defunct Adelaide Avalanche who folded mid-season. The team plays its home games at the IceArenA, located in the suburb of Thebarton. The Adrenaline are one time Goodall Cup champions from 2009.

== History ==
Original logo used for the 2008 season

The team was formed at the start of July 2008 to replace the Adelaide Avalanche after they folded in June. In a deal with the AIHL the A's picked up the Avalanche's team list and fulfilled the existing game schedule for the remainder of the 2008 season. After the 2008 season the A's were renamed the Adelaide Adrenaline for the upcoming 2009 season. The Adrenaline's best result in the regular season came in the 2012 season when they finished second in their conference and second overall. The team have qualified for the playoffs on four occasions, winning the Goodall Cup in 2009 and finishing runners-up in 2010.

The 2009 season saw the newly named Adrenaline perform strongly in the regular season. Adelaide won 16 of 24 matches and finished third in the league table, qualifying for the finals weekend in Newcastle. 29 August 2009, the Adrenaline played the Melbourne Ice in the semi-final at the Hunter Ice Skating Stadium. Adelaide took an early lead in the first period thanks to a Sami Mantere goal and never looked back from that point. The Adrenaline ended up winning the match 6–1 with Sami Mantere, Jeremy Beirnes and Mike Werner all scoring braces. 30 August 2009, the Adrenaline came up against the Newcastle North Stars in the AIHL Championship final in front of 950 people. It was a match where power plays provided the opportunities to break down stubborn defences with three of the four goals scored during regulation time coming with a man advantage. After a scoreless third period the two teams could not be separated on 2-2 and the match advanced to overtime. Cassian Delsar stepped up and scored the winner in overtime to claim the Adrenaline's first ever title and the finals MVP. Adelaide was presented with the brand new H Newman Reid Trophy for winning the AIHL Championship. The trophy replaced the Goodall Cup, which had been withdrawn from the competition before the start of the season. The Goodall Cup returned the following season and the Adrenaline championship title win was backdated and Adelaide was awarded the Cup. The H Newman Reid Trophy became the premiership title prize instead.

In the 2010 season, the Adrenaline again reached the AIHL finals weekend by finishing fourth in the league standings. Adelaide drew the North Stars in the semi-finals in a reply of the previous season's final. In a vastly different kind of match compared to the final in 2009, the Adrenaline outshot the North Stars to beat Newcastle 7-6 to reach their second Goodall Cup final in a row. In the final Adelaide come up against home team, the Melbourne Ice. In front of a packed Melbourne Icehouse, Adelaide put up a good performance but ultimately fell short and lost the final 4–6.

Ahead of the 2017 season, the Adrenaline announced a club re-brand with a new logo, uniform and digital design and assets. The re-brand was released with a new team hashtag ‘#OneBeat’. The new logo was a stylised ‘A’ shaped by a heartbeat line presentation. In addition to the new primary logo, the Adrenaline revealed a new secondary logo to be used as shoulder patches on jerseys. The circular badge features the South Australian piping shrike emblematic bird at its heart on a white background. Surrounding piping shrike is the team name in full ‘Adelaide Adrenaline Ice Hockey Club’ on a navy background. The emblem is boarded by a red and yellow border to complete the team’s entire colour palette. The new kits kept the traditional primary blue home colour and white away.

On 13 May 2018, Adelaide, AIHL and Australian ice hockey legend, Greg Oddy announced his retirement. Over the course of 19 years Oddy became a superstar of the local game. Upon his retirement, Oddy held four AIHL all-time records for appearances (615), goals (268), assists (347) and points (615). Greg held the points record for the Australian national team (118). Oddy was a leader for the Adrenaline and Adelaide Avalanche. He captained both teams for 11 seasons combined (2005-2016). He won 3 Goodall Cups (2 with the Avalanche and 1 with the Adrenaline) and 3 gold medals with the national team. Oddy was Adelaide's last remaining foundation player still playing in 2018. Oddy's family built the Adrenaline and Avalanche teams and his contribution to South Australian hockey, the AIHL, the national team and the Adrenaline will not be forgotten.

On 11 January 2020, The Adrenaline announced former player and head coach Sami Mantere had been re-appointed as head coach for the 2020 season. Sami replaced outgoing head coach, Jim Fuyarchuk, who held the position for the last two seasons. However, due to the postponement and eventual cancellation of the 2020 AIHL season, Sami was never in charge of a game in his second stint as Adrenaline head coach. The 2021 season followed 2020 in being cancelled by the AIHL, the Adrenaline went a second year without playing a game.

Adelaide Adrenaline's logo used from 2022 to 2024.

During the two season hiatus, in October 2021, the AIHL began an expression of interest process to find a new licensee for the Adelaide Adrenaline license, following former holders, the South Australian Ice Sports Federation, relinquishing the license at the conclusion of the 2019 season. The process took five months, and in February 2022 the new license holder was announced as Benny Gebert and Glen Foll. Foll and Gebert were then appointed directors of the club and took on the roles of Hockey Operations Manager and Club Operations Manager respectfully.

The Adrenaline were all ready to return to the ice in 2022 following the announcement of the 2022 AIHL season going ahead in December 2021. Games were slated for the Adrenaline in the official schedule release by the league in February 2022. However, the Adrenaline made it publicly known that they were locked in ongoing negotiations with the new management of the Adelaide IceArenA and had not yet secured an ice time agreement for games and training. The IceArenA management released a signed letter making public a list of grievances with the AIHL and stated it would be difficult for the venue to support the league. On 20 March 2022, the Adrenaline rejected the IceArenA’s offer, stating the offer was both unviable and non-equitable. Following the collapse of the negotiation process and due to a lack of alternative rink facility options in South Australia, the Adrenaline confirmed the team would withdraw from the 2022 AIHL season and hoped to return to action in 2023.

In 2023, ahead of the 2023 AIHL season the Adelaide Adrenaline released an updated version of their team logo with a modified colour scheme. The team's colours changed from navy blue, yellow, white and red to dark blue, red, gold and black. The new colour scheme brings the Adrenaline into line with two other Adelaide based sporting teams, baseball team Adelaide Giants and basketball team Adelaide 36ers. The logo promoted the colour red to become more prominent with the font changing, while the positioning of Adelaide and Adrenaline was switched.

== Season-by-season results ==
Adelaide Adrenaline all-time record
Season	Regular season											Finals									Top points scorer
Season	P	W	T	L	OW	OL	GF	GA	GD	Pts	Finish	P	W	L	GF	GA	Result	Preliminary Final	Semi Final	Goodall Cup Final	Name	Points
2008^{1}	28	6	–	14	6	2	90	107	−17	32	6th	–									(Sweden) Peter Lindgren	29
2009	24	15	–	8	1	–	117	75	+42	47	3rd	2	2	–	12	5	Champion	–	Won 6–1 (Ice)	Won 3–2 (North Stars)	(Finland) Sami Mantere	33
2010	24	8	–	6	5	5	107	92	+15	39	4th	2	1	1	11	12	Runner-up	–	Won 7–6 (North Stars)	Lost 4–6 (Ice)	(Australia) Greg Oddy	41
2011	28	12	–	9	5	2	117	94	+23	48	4th	1	–	1	3	8	Semi-finalist	–	Lost 3–8 (Ice)	–	(Czech Republic) Josef Rezek	36
2012	24	13	–	8	1	2	96	76	+20	43	3rd	1	–	1	4	5	Semi-finalist	–	Lost 4–5 (North Stars)	–	(Australia) Greg Oddy	46
2013	28	8	–	12	3	5	125	124	+1	35	6th	–									(Australia) Greg Oddy	37
2014	28	10	2^{2}	10	5	1	94	90	+4	43	5th	–									(Canada) Brett Liscomb	36
2015	28	11	–	11	3	3	109	111	−2	42	5th	–									(Australia) Wehebe Darge	44
2016	28	5	–	18	1	4	83	127	−44	21	8th	–									(Australia) Wehebe Darge	52
2017	28	6	–	18	1	3	85	142	−57	23	8th	–									(Canada) Cameron Critchlow	43
2018	28	3	–	20	2	3	62	151	−89	16	8th	–									(Czech Republic) Ales Kratoska	36
2019	28	0	–	26	0	2	71	188	−117	2	8th	–									(Czech Republic) Ales Kratoska	31
2020	2020 and 2021 AIHL seasons were cancelled and not contested
2021	2020 and 2021 AIHL seasons were cancelled and not contested
2022	Withdrew from 2022 AIHL season
2023	26	4	–	21	0	1	90	162	−72	13	9th	–									(Canada) Brett Radford	26
2024	30	5	–	17	2	6	70	108	−38	25	9th	–									(Canada) Josh Adkins	44
2025	28	10	–	16	0	2	104	148	−44	32	7th	–									(Canada) Josh Adkins	49
2026	–	–	–	–	–	–	–	–	–	–	–	–	–	–	–	–	–	–	–	–	–	–
Totals	352	107	2	176	33	34	1260	1525	-265			6	3	3	30	30

^{1} In a deal with the AIHL, previous games results and statistics for the Adelaide Avalanche were carried over to the A's for the 2008 season.
^{2} Despite there being no ties in the AIHL, since the introduction of the shootout in 2006, the Adrenaline were awarded two ties against the Brave and Bears for game cancellations due to a bus crash involving the traveling Adrenaline players and coaching staff en route to Canberra.

Champions	Runners-up	Third place

== Championships ==
- Goodall Cup

(gold) Champions (1): 2009
(silver) Runners-Up (1): 2010

- H Newman Reid Trophy (replaced the V.I.P. Cup)

(gold) Premiers (0):
(bronze) Third-placed (1): 2012

== Players ==
=== Current roster ===
Team roster for the 2026 AIHL season

Adelaide Adrenaline roster - 2026 AIHL season
Active roster		Inactive roster	Coaching staff
Goaltenders: 1 (Australia) Jeremy Friederich; 31 (Canada) Cale Dolan (I); 31 (Australia) Riley Knapp; 31 (Australia) Samuel Poole; - (Australia) Liam Scrimshaw; Defencemen: 5 (Australia) Daniel Koudelka; 6 (Australia) Zachary Boyle; 7 (Australia) Ryan Foll; 15 (Canada) Timothy Payne (I); 17 (Australia) Andrew Chen; 18 (Australia) Zachary Steele; 19 (Australia) Luka Loria; 20 (Australia) Damon Von Einem; 20 (Australia) Mickey Nottle; 27 (Australia) Morris O'Handley; 44 (Canada) Austin Pickford (I); 46 (Canada) Shaun Dosanjh (I); 55 (Australia) Darcy Flanagan	Forwards: 4 (Australia) Julian Friederich; 8 (Australia) Daniel O'Handley; 9 (Australia) Marcel McGuiness; 13 (Australia) Nathaniel Benson; 14 (Australia) Dominik Trnka; 16 (Australia) Jake Riley; 21 (Australia) Yongen Song; 23 (Scotland) Kyle MacPhail; 26 (Australia) Joey MacDougall (C); 46 (Canada) Shai Rabinowitz; 46 (Australia) Lucas Giveen Gomes De Reis; 60 (Australia) Tyler Boyle; 73 (Australia) Steve Best; 81 (Jamaica) Kolby Johnson (I); 88 (Canada) Coy Prevost (I)	12 (Canada) Josh Adkins (I); 22 (Denmark) Rasmus Simonsen (I); 46 (Russia) Vyacheslav Sarkisyants (I); 77 (Canada) Tucker Scantlebury (I); - (Australia) Nikita Loria	Head Coach: (Canada) Rory Rawlyk; Coaches: (Canada) Andrew Hamilton (AC); (Australia) James Dyer (TM); (Australia) Steven Wren (TD); (Australia) Sara Stephensen(TD); Legend (C) Captain (A) Alternate Captain (I) Import player Statistics; Average age: 25.22 years Average height: 183.59 cm Average weight: 84.14kg Locals: 26; Imports: 5
Last updated on: 22 August 2026
Elite Prospects IHNA

=== Retired numbers ===
Throughout the history of the Adrenaline, one jersey number has been retired in honour of a former club legend. The Adrenaline has already indicated they will retire Greg Oddy's jersey in the future.

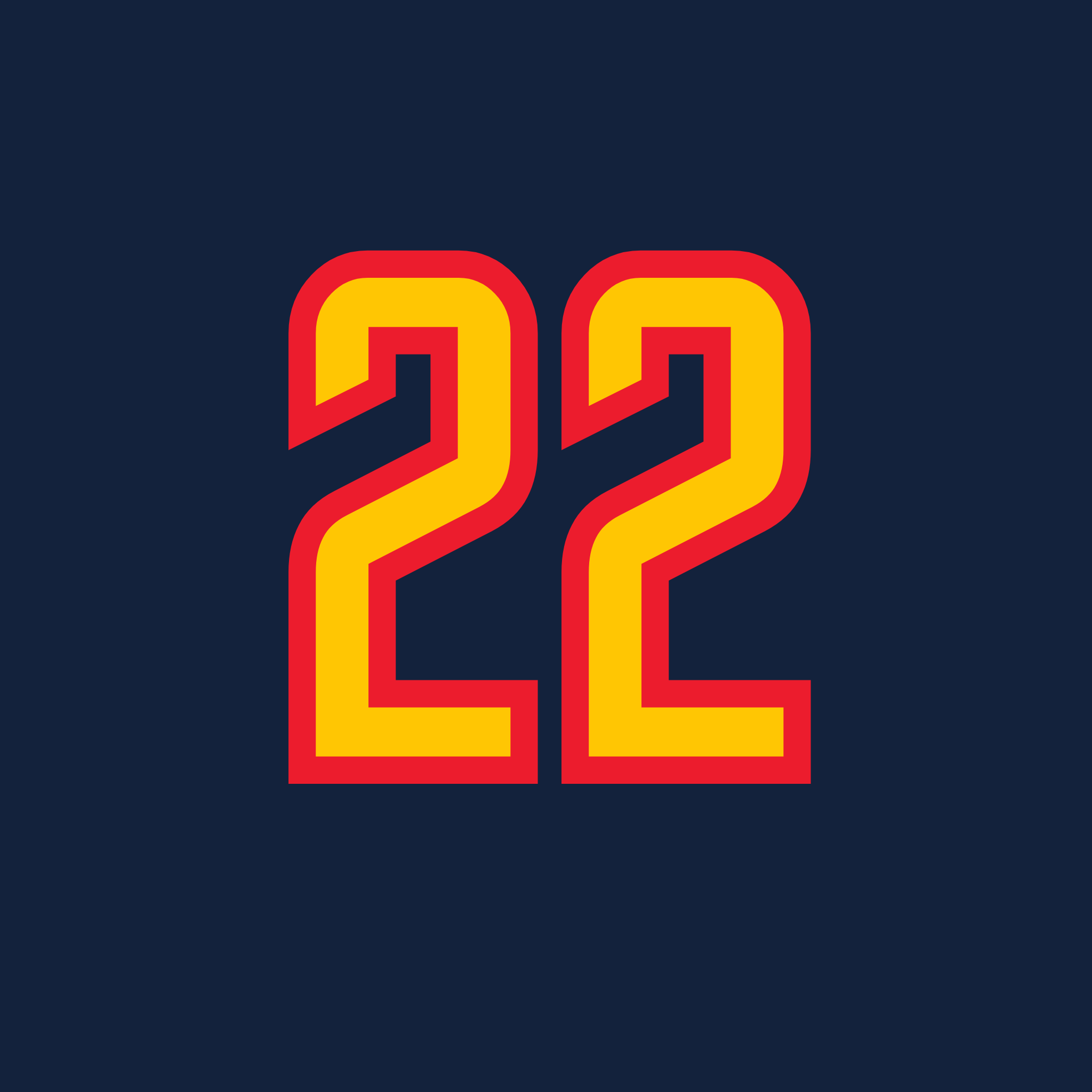
Retired number	History
	(Australia) Josh Harding – # 22 (2009-2016, Defenseman); Josh Harding was a founding player for the Adrenaline. Josh had been playing hockey in Adelaide, for the Avalanche, at the top level since 2003. In 250 AIHL games, third most in an Adelaide uniform, Harding clocked up 185 points, a Goodall Cup in 2009 and seven selections to the National Team. In 2011 Josh joined the Adrenaline leadership team as alternative captain. A position he held for five years. Former Adrenaline head coach and president Ryan O'Handley, who coached Harding both with Adelaide and the National Team, said he 'considers Josh the best Australian defenseman of his era. Harding was the total package on the ice. He used his combination of size and speed perfectly to compliment his incredible puck skills'. Harding's number 22 jersey was retired at the IceArenA in a pre-match ceremony on 22 July 2018.

=== Player records ===
As of 2019 AIHL season

==== All-time totals ====
These are the top-ten all-time player records in franchise history for the following categories: Appearances, Goals, Assists, Points, Penalty minutes
(Figures are updated after each completed AIHL regular season)

All-time Apperiences
#	Name	Pos	GP
1	(Australia) Greg Oddy	F	383
2	(Australia) David Huxley	D	261
3	(Australia) Joshua Harding	D	250
4	(Australia) James Keane	F	207
5	(Australia) Sean Greer	D	200
6	(Australia) Darren Corstens	F	173
7	(Australia) Josef Rezek	F	171
8	(Australia) Luke Thilthorpe	F	157
9	(Australia) Wehebe Darge	F	147
10	(Australia) Cass Delsar	F	147

All-time Goals
#	Name	Pos	G
1	(Australia) Greg Oddy	F	268
2	(Australia) Trevor Walsh	F	118
3	(Australia) Wehebe Darge	F	98
4	(Australia) Ben Thilthorpe	F	86
5	(Australia) Josef Rezek	F	75
6	(Australia) James Keane	F	73
7	(Australia) Luke Thilthorpe	F	55
8	(Australia) John Oddy	F	51
9	(Australia) Joshua Harding	D	50
10	(Australia) Chris Brlecic	F	48

All-time Assists
#	Name	Pos	A
1	(Australia) Greg Oddy	F	347
2	(Australia) Joshua Harding	D	135
3	(Australia) Josef Rezek	F	132
4	(Australia) Wehebe Darge	F	112
5	(Australia) Trevor Walsh	F	93
6	(Australia) Luke Thilthorpe	F	84
7	(Australia) Ben Thilthorpe	F	76
8	(Australia) Chris Brlecic	F	74
9	(Australia) David Huxley	D	73
10	(Australia) James Keane	F	71

All-time Points
#	Name	Pos	Pts
1	(Australia) Greg Oddy	F	615
2	(Australia) Trevor Walsh	F	211
3	(Australia) Wehebe Darge	F	210
4	(Australia) Josef Rezek	F	207
5	(Australia) Joshua Harding	D	185
6	(Australia) Ben Thilthorpe	F	162
7	(Australia) James Keane	F	144
8	(Australia) Luke Thilthorpe	F	139
9	(Australia) Chris Brlecic	F	122
10	(Australia) John Oddy	F	111

All-time Penalties
#	Name	Pos	PIM
1	(Australia) Greg Oddy	F	938
2	(Australia) Trevor Walsh	F	604
3	(Australia) Cass Delsar	F	508
4	(Australia) Ben Thilthorpe	F	406
5	(Australia) Sean Greer	D	393
6	(Australia) Chris Brlecic	F	379
7	(Australia) John Oddy	F	350
8	(Australia) Luke Thilthorpe	F	349
9	(Australia) Joshua Harding	D	329
10	(Australia) David Huxley	D	284

Legend:

Current Adrenaline player

==== By season totals ====
These are the top-ten season by season all-time player records in franchise history for the following categories: Points, Penalty minutes and Save Percentage
(Figures are updated after each completed AIHL regular season)

By Season Points
#	Name	Season	Pos	GP
1	(Australia) Wehebe Darge	2016	F	52
2	(Australia) Greg Oddy	2012	F	46
3	(Australia) Wehebe Darge	2015	F	44
4	(Canada) Cameron Critchlow	2017	F	43
5	(Canada) Brett Liscomb	2012	F	43
6	(Australia) Greg Oddy	2010	F	42
7	(Canada) Cameron Dion	2010	F	38
8	(Canada) Tyler Grove	2005	F	38
9	(United States) T.J. Battani	2016	F	37
10	(Australia) Greg Oddy	2013	F	37

By Season PIM
#	Name	Season	Pos	G
1	(Canada) Jeremy Beirnes	2009	F	148
2	(Canada) Kyle Neuber	2019	F	146
3	(Australia) Sean Greer	2013	D	123
4	(Australia) Cass Delsar	2011	F	112
5	(United States) Donny Grover	2009	D	112
6	(Australia) Greg Oddy	2008	F	110
7	(Australia) Tyler Grove	2015	F	108
8	(Australia) Andrew White	2015	D	101
9	(Australia) Cass Delsar	2008	F	97
10	(Canada) Alexandre Gauthier	2019	D	94

By Season Save Percentage
#	Name	Season	Pos	A
1	(Canada) Matt Murphy	2017	G	.911%
2	(Canada) Aaron Barton	2012	G	.905%
3	(United Kingdom) Michael Will	2014	G	.895%
4	(Australia) Charlie Smart	2015	G	.894%
5	(Sweden) Seb Andersson	2018	G	.886%
6	(Australia) Peter King	2016	G	.885%
7	(Australia) Olivier Martin	2009	G	.883%
8	(Australia) Olivier Martin	2011	G	.878%
9	(Australia) Olivier Martin	2010	G	.871%
10	(Canada) Jesse Gordichuk	2019	G	.869%

== Team Staff ==
Current as of 2024 AIHL season

Adrenaline staff
Role	Staff
Head coach	(Canada) Kaden Elder
Assistant coach	(Australia) Eric Lien
Assistant coach	(Australia) Jeremy Friederich
Team manager	(Australia) Jamie Taylor
General manager	(Australia) Glen Foll
Trainer	(Australia) Jake Hazel
Governor	(Australia) Glen Foll

== Leaders ==
=== Team captains ===
The Adrenaline have had three captains in the team's history.

No.	Name	Term
1	(Australia) Greg Oddy	2008–16
2	(Australia) David Huxley	2017
3	(Australia) Josef Rezek	2018–19
4	(Canada) Joey MacDougall	2023–Present

=== Head coaches ===
The Adrenaline have had six head coaches in the team's history.

No.	Name	Term
1	(Australia) John Botterill	2008–09
2	(Australia) Mike Gainer	2010–11
3	(Australia) Ryan O'Handley	2012–14
4	(Australia) Trevor Walsh	2015–16
5	(Finland) Sami Mantere	2017
6	(Australia) Jim Fuyarchuk	2018–19
7	(Finland) Sami Mantere	2020
8	(Australia) Stu Henly	2023–24
9	(Canada) Kaden Elder (P/C)	2024–Present

== Broadcasting ==
Current:

- AIHL.TV (2023-present) – Worldwide paid subscription-based online video broadcasting published by the AIHL in partnership with the Clutch.TV platform using local production companies at each team’s rink. The service went live in April 2023, and would cover every AIHL regular season and finals games live and on demand.
- Sportradar (2022 - present) – International online video broadcasting in North America and Europe as part of a league-wide 3-year deal signed in March 2022 in the lead up to the 2022 AIHL season.

Former:

- Kayo Sports (2022 - present) – Domestic online video broadcasting in Australia as part of the league wide deal struck in the lead up to the 2022 AIHL season to show every AIHL game live. ATC Productions producing the streams.
- Fox Sports (2013 – 2019) – Part of the entire AIHL domestic TV broadcasting deal with Fox Sports to show one game a round, normally on Thursday's at 4:30 pm or after NHL games during NHL season.
- Self-broadcast (2016–2019) – Between 2016 and 2019 the Adelaide Adrenaline self-broadcast all home matches with an online audio stream utilising the Mixlr platform.
