= 2014 AIHL season =

- League: Australian Ice Hockey League
- Sport: Ice hockey
- Duration: 12 April 2014 – 31 August 2014

Regular season
- H Newman Reid Trophy: Melbourne Mustangs (1st title)
- Season MVP: Simon Barg (Ice Dogs)
- Top scorer: Simon Barg (69 points) (Ice Dogs)

Goodall Cup
- Champions: Melbourne Mustangs
- Runners-up: Melbourne Ice
- Finals MVP: Viktor Gibbs Sjödin (Mustangs)

AIHL seasons
- ← 2013 2015 →

The 2014 AIHL season was the 15th season of the Australian Ice Hockey League (AIHL). It ran from 12 April 2014 until 24 August 2014, with the Goodall Cup finals following on 30 and 31 August. The Melbourne Mustangs won both the H Newman Reid Trophy for finishing first in the regular season, and the Goodall Cup after defeating the Melbourne Ice in the final.

== Teams ==
In 2014 the AIHL had 8 teams competing in the league.

2014 AIHL teams
Team	City	Arena	Head Coach	Captain
Adelaide Adrenaline	(South Australia) Adelaide	IceArenA	(Australia) Ryan O'Handley	(Australia) Greg Oddy
CBR Brave	(Australian Capital Territory) Canberra	Phillip Ice Skating Centre	(Finland) Matti Louma	(Australia) Mark Rummukainen
Melbourne Ice	(Victoria (state)) Melbourne	Medibank Icehouse	(Australia) Brent Laver	(Australia) Lliam Webster
Melbourne Mustangs	(Victoria (state)) Melbourne	Medibank Icehouse	(Australia) Brad Vigon	(Australia) Sean Jones
Newcastle North Stars	(New South Wales) Newcastle	Hunter Ice Skating Stadium	(Australia) Garry Doré	(Australia) Robert Starke
Perth Thunder	(Western Australia) Perth	Perth Ice Arena	(Australia) Dylan Forsythe	(Australia) Samuel Wilson
Sydney Bears	(New South Wales) Sydney	Sydney Ice Arena	(Australia) Vladimir Rubes	(Australia) Michael Schlamp
Sydney Ice Dogs	(New South Wales) Sydney	Liverpool Catholic Club Ice Rink	(Australia) Andrew Petrie	(Australia) Robert Malloy

== League business ==
In October 2013 it was confirmed that the Gold Coast Blue Tongues would remain suspended for the 2014 season. The team have until the 2015 season before their licence is reviewed. On 26 February 2014 Canberra Knights owner John Raut announced that the team had folded operations effective immediately and would not be competing in the upcoming 2014 season. Raut cited financial costs, lack of local players and poor performance as the reasons behind the move. The following day it was announced that the player group headed by captain Mark Rummukainen had approached the league with plans on taking on the club's licence. The following month the league announced that they had granted a provisional licence to a Canberra consortium, which involved the player group, to take on the licence and replace the Knights in the 2014 season. The new team was announced as the CBR Brave. The Melbourne Mustangs announced in March 2014 that they had signed a deal with MOAT: Mental Health Services who will become the teams naming sponsors for the 2014 and 2015 seasons. The team's name will change to MOAT: Melbourne Mustangs Ice Hockey Club. Air Canada expanded their sponsorship of the AIHL to the entire 2014 season after last year sponsoring the 2013 finals series. They also announced they will continue to show a highlights package of the 2013 finals series as part of their in-flight entertainment until the end of June. They will then replace it with the 2014 Canada Day Classic between the Sydney Bears and Melbourne Mustangs and the 2014 AIHL finals series.

=== Exhibition games ===
The first exhibition game was held in November 2013 with the Sydney Bears playing a match against former AIHL team, the Central Coast Rhinos. The Rhinos who previously played in the AIHL from 2005 to 2008 went on to win the game 8–4. A second game involving the Bears and Rhinos was held in March 2014 with the Bears winning 8–2. In February 2014 it was announced that the pre season tournament, the Wilson Cup, would be revived. The tournament was last played in 2009 and was won by the Rhinos. The 2014 edition features the Newcastle North Stars, Sydney Bears and the Sydney Ice Dogs. The tournament features a round robin of the three teams and finishes with a final between the top two placed teams. In started on 16 March and finished on 5 April. In the opening game of the Wilson Cup the North Stars defeated the Bears 4–3 in a shootout. The North Stars however lost game two to the Ice Dogs 5–4 in a shootout. In the last game of the round robin the Ice Dogs defeated the Sydney Bears 8–1 and they finished first in the standings. The Ice Dogs were drawn against the North Stars in the final who finished the round robin in second place. The Ice Dogs defeated the North Stars 4–2, winning their first Wilson Cup title. On 27 March the Melbourne Ice and Melbourne Mustangs held an exhibition game at the Medibank Icehouse with the Ice defeating the Mustangs 8–3. On 3 and 5 April the Australian national team held two exhibition games against the Mustangs and Ice. The two games were played at the Medibank Icehouse and were held as part of the team's preparation for the 2014 IIHF World Championship Division II Group A tournament being held in Serbia from 9 to 15 April. Australia won both of the games, defeating the Mustangs 9–3 and the Ice 4–1.

=== Personnel changes ===
In November 2013 Melbourne Ice announced that assistant coach Brent Laver has been promoted to the head coach position, replacing Sandy Gardner who had been in the job for only the 2013 season. The team also announced that former player, Glen Mayer had signed on as an assistant coach, along with former Swedish First Division player, Johan Steenberg, who was appointed back in June 2013. Just prior to the start of the season Perth Thunder Coach Stan Scott announced that he had stepped down as head coach in order to focus on the General Manager operations of the club. Scott was replaced by Dylan Forsythe as head coach and but remained on the coaching panel as an assistant. After eight games into the season it was announced that Forsythe had stepped down as head coach effective immediately for unknown reasons. He was replaced by Stan Scott who agreed to take over as interim head coach for the remainder of the season. On 24 April 2014 the Sydney Ice Dogs head coach Ron Kuprowsky and his assistants Colin Downie and Brad Andrlon had resigned from their positions. The club appointed Dion Dunwoodie as interim head coach with Mark Page and Anthony Wilson as his assistants. On 9 May 2014 the Ice Dogs signed Andrew Petrie as their new head coach.

=== Player transfers ===
Players signed

Player	Previous team	New team	Ref
(Australia) Matthew Anderson	No team	Melbourne Mustangs	
(United Kingdom) Richard Ashton	No team	Melbourne Ice	
(Canada) Antoine Aubin	Newcastle North Stars ECSL	Newcastle North Stars	
(Australia) Brendan Ayton	No team	Sydney Bears	
(Australia) Matthew Ayton	No team	Sydney Bears	
(Australia) Sonny Bal	No team	Melbourne Ice	
(Australia) Brian Bales	No team	Newcastle North Stars	
(Australia) David Bell	Canberra Knights	CBR Brave	
(Canada) Stephen Blunden	University of Ottawa	CBR Brave	
(Australia) Zachary Boyle	Adelaide Blackhawks	Adelaide Adrenaline	
(Australia) Jeremy Brown	Sherbrooke Cougars	Melbourne Ice	
(Australia) Mitch Bye	No team	Sydney Ice Dogs	
(Australia) Harrison Byers	Canberra Knights	CBR Brave	
(Australia) James Byers	Canberra Knights	CBR Brave	
(Australia) Blake Cameron	Canberra Knights	CBR Brave	
(Canada) Graham Charbonneau	No team	Adelaide Adrenaline	
(Canada) David Chubb	Gander Flyers	Adelaide Adrenaline	
(Australia) Robert Clark	No team	Melbourne Ice	
(Australia) Aaron Clayworth	No team	CBR Brave	
(Australia) Stuart Clemie	ECSL Vipers	Sydney Bears	
(Canada) John Clewlow	Fayetteville FireAntz	Sydney Ice Dogs	
(Australia) Darren Cope	No team	CBR Brave	
(Canada) Scott Corbett	No team	Melbourne Ice	
(Australia) Ethan Cornford	Melbourne Whalers	Melbourne Mustangs	
(Canada) Cody Danberg	Shellbrook Elks	Newcastle North Stars	
(United States) Ben DiMarco	Vikingar	Sydney Bears	
(Australia) Nickolas Eckhardt	Canberra Knights	CBR Brave	
(Australia) Ryan Foll	Adelaide Tigers	Adelaide Adrenaline	
(Canada) Justin Fox	Quad City Mallards	Perth Thunder	
(Australia) Jordan Gavin	Canberra Knights	CBR Brave	
(Australia) Kaden Goulds	Cockburn Hawks	Perth Thunder	
(United States) Jeff Grant	Louisiana IceGators	Melbourne Mustangs	
(Australia) Jordan Grover	Perth Pelicans	Perth Thunder	
(Australia) Sean Hamilton	Perth Thunder	Melbourne Ice	
(Australia) Joshua Hansen	Sydney Sabres	Newcastle North Stars	
(Canada) Matthew Harvey	Okotoks Drillers	CBR Brave	
(Australia) Sam Hodic	Melbourne Glaciers	Melbourne Ice	
(Australia) Ross Howell	No team	Melbourne Ice	
(Australia) Joseph Hughes	Melbourne Ice	Melbourne Mustangs	
(Australia) Vincent Hughes	Melbourne Ice	Melbourne Mustangs	
(Australia) Brad Hunt	Canberra Knights	CBR Brave	
(Sweden) Gustaf Huth	Lidingö Vikings	Melbourne Ice	
(Australia) Greg Hyde	No team	Perth Thunder	
(Sweden) Tim Johansson	No team	Melbourne Ice	
(Australia) Adam Kimbley	Sydney Heat	Sydney Bears	
(Finland) Anton Kokkonen	TuTo	CBR Brave	
(Czech Republic) Martin Kutek	No team	Melbourne Mustangs	
(Australia) Samuel Lammert	Sydney Sabres	Newcastle North Stars	
(Australia) Matt Lehoczky	No team	CBR Brave	
(Australia) Tom Letki	Canberra Knights	CBR Brave	
(Australia) David Lewis	Canberra Knights	CBR Brave	
(Sweden) Måns Lindgren	Piteå HC J20	Adelaide Adrenaline	
(Canada) Brett Liscomb	Fayetteville FireAntz	Adelaide Adrenaline	
(United States) Dane Ludolph	Park City Pioneers	Sydney Bears	
(Australia) Riley Major	Sydney Sabres	Sydney Bears	
(Canada) Harrison May	University of Ottawa	Newcastle North Stars	
(Australia) Jarrad McDonnell	No team	Adelaide Adrenaline	
(Australia) Joel McFadden	No team	Sydney Bears	
(Australia) Remy McGuiness	Perth Sharks	Adelaide Adrenaline	
(Australia) Christopher McPhail	No team	CBR Brave	
(Australia) Kai Miettinen	Canberra Knights	CBR Brave	
(Canada) Carter Moore	No team	Sydney Ice Dogs	
(United States) Matt Monaghan	No team	Sydney Ice Dogs	
(Australia) Patrick Nadin	Sydney Wolf Pack	Newcastle North Stars	
(Australia) Tim Newmark	Massachusetts Junior Mariners	Sydney Bears	
(Finland) Aku Nevalainen	No team	Perth Thunder	
(Sweden) Timothy Noting	Rimbo IF	Sydney Ice Dogs	
(Canada) Mathieu Ouellette	University of Ottawa	CBR Brave	
(Sweden) Daniel Palmkvist	Nittorps IK	Sydney Bears	
(Australia) Thomas Papps	No team	Adelaide Adrenaline	
(Australia) Dean Peterson	No team	Adelaide Adrenaline	
(Finland) Petri Pitkänen	KeuPa HT	CBR Brave	
(Australia) Jason Polglase	No team	Newcastle North Stars	
(Australia) Harley Quinton-Jones	Sydney Wolf Pack	Newcastle North Stars	
(Australia) Shai Rabinowitz	Newcastle North Stars	CBR Brave	
(Finland) Kim Ranta-Aho	No team	Perth Thunder	
(Australia) Ryan Remillard	No team	Adelaide Adrenaline	
(Australia) Alain Riesen	Canberra Knights	CBR Brave	
(Australia) Troy Robertson	No team	Melbourne Mustangs	
(Australia) Cameron Rose	Massachusetts Junior Mariners	Sydney Ice Dogs	
(Australia) Mark Rummukainen	Canberra Knights	CBR Brave	
(Australia) Hayden Sheard	Sydney Sabres	Newcastle North Stars	
(Sweden) Viktor Gibbs Sjödin	Ferencvárosi TC	Melbourne Mustangs	
(Australia) Jarrod Smith	Sydney Wolf Pack	Sydney Bears	
(Canada) Jeff Smith	Hull Stingrays	Melbourne Ice	
(Australia) Shane Southwood	No team	Sydney Ice Dogs	
(Finland) Niko Suoraniemi	Herlev Eagles	Adelaide Adrenaline	
(Australia) Robert Summons	No team	Melbourne Mustangs	
(Canada) Sean Hamilton Steen	No team	Sydney Bears	
(Canada) Stuart Stefan	Huntsville Havoc	Perth Thunder	
(Australia) Alec Stephenson	Sydney Wolf Pack	Sydney Bears	
(Australia) Matt Taylor	Canberra Knights	Newcastle North Stars	
(Australia) Peter Taylor	Canberra Knights	CBR Brave	
(Australia) Shaun Tobin	Perth Sharks	Perth Thunder	
(Australia) Marco Tomasello	No team	Sydney Ice Dogs	
(United States) Corey Toy	Fayetteville FireAntz	Perth Thunder	
(Canada) Derek Walker	St. James Canucks	CBR Brave	
(Australia) Kieren Webster	Perth Pelicans	Perth Thunder	
(Canada) Corey Wilkie	St. James Canucks	CBR Brave	
(Canada) Rob Willis	No team	Sydney Bears	
(Canada) Chris Wilson	Louisiana IceGators	Newcastle North Stars	
(Australia) Stuart Woodall	Canberra Knights	CBR Brave	
(Australia) Jamie Woodman	Palm Beach Hawks	Perth Thunder	

Players lost

Player	Previous team	New team	Ref
(Australia) Travis Alabaster	Melbourne Mustangs	No team	
(Australia) Kenneth Autterson	Sydney Bears	ECSL Sting	
(Australia) Jonathan Bale	Sydney Bears	No team	
(Australia) Alistair Band	Canberra Knights	Haringey Racers	
(Australia) Shane Barrow	Sydney Bears	Sydney Heat	
(United States) Brian Berger	Perth Thunder	Marian University	
(Canada) Luc-Olivier Blain	Adelaide Adrenaline	Anglet Hormadi Élite	
(Australia) Tyson Boyd	Adelaide Adrenaline	Adelaide Blackhawks	
(Canada) Jordan Braid	Canberra Knights	Columbus Cottonmouths	
(Australia) Russel Brewer	Adelaide Adrenaline	Adelaide Tigers	
(Australia) Caleb Butler	Melbourne Ice	No team	
(Canada) Dan Clarke	Perth Thunder	Mississippi Surge	
(Australia) Scott Clemie	Sydney Bears	Sydney Wolf Pack	
(Canada) Pier-Olivier Cotnoir	Newcastle North Stars	TEV Miesbach	
(Australia) Fred Coutts	Perth Thunder	No team	
(Australia) Andrew Crowther	Melbourne Ice	No team	
(Australia) Todd Cutter	Melbourne Mustangs	No team	
(Australia) Kevin Darcy	Perth Thunder	University of Oklahoma	
(Australia) James David	Adelaide Adrenaline	Adelaide Falcons	
(Australia) Rob Duchemin	Newcastle North Stars	No team	
(Australia) Andrew Erzen	Melbourne Ice	No team	
(Australia) Michael Fairlamb	Canberra Knights	No team	
(United States) Michael Forney	Perth Thunder	EC VSV	
(South Africa) Robin Forsythe	Melbourne Mustangs	No team	
(United States) Chris Frank	Melbourne Ice	Braehead Clan	
(United States) Ian Fulion	Canberra Knights	No team	
(Australia) Tim Fulton	Canberra Knights	No team	
(United States) Kevin Glanzman	Melbourne Mustangs	No team	
(Canada) John Gordon	Melbourne Ice	EV Füssen	
(Australia) Sean Hamilton	Perth Thunder	Melbourne Ice	
(United Kingdom) Matthew Haywood	Adelaide Adrenaline	Braehead Clan	
(Australia) Stuart Higgins	Melbourne Mustangs	No team	
(Canada) Aaron Hoffman	Perth Thunder	No team	
(Australia) Joseph Hughes	Melbourne Ice	Melbourne Mustangs	
(Australia) Vincent Hughes	Melbourne Ice	Melbourne Mustangs	
(New Zealand) Stephen Huish	Perth Thunder	West Auckland Admirals	
(New Zealand) Lyle Idoine	Sydney Bears	No team	
(Finland) Mikko Jortikka	Canberra Knights	TuTo	
(Latvia) Renars Kazanovs	Sydney Bears	HK Kurbads	
(Australia) Chris Kelly	Newcastle North Stars	No team	
(Australia) Anthony Kimlin	Sydney Ice Dogs	Whitby Dunlops	
(Australia) Martin Kolos	Sydney Bears	ECSL Sting	
(Czech Republic) Jan Koubek	Sydney Bears	No team	
(Czech Republic) Tomas Landa	Sydney Bears	HC Risuty	
(Australia) Richie Lamb	Perth Thunder	West Coast Flyers	
(Canada) Justin Levac	Canberra Knights	St. Charles Chill	
(United States) Ryan Lowe	Sydney Bears	No team	
(Australia) Matti Luoma	Canberra Knights	Retired	
(Switzerland) Silvan Maeder	Sydney Bears	ECSL Sting	
(Australia) Tomas Manco	Sydney Ice Dogs	No team	
(Australia) Ayden Millward	Perth Thunder	No team	
(Canada) Dan Mohle	Perth Thunder	No team	
(Australia) Dylan Moore	Melbourne Ice	No team	
(Canada) Jeff Martens	Newcastle North Stars	Brampton Beast	
(Australia) Olivier Martin	Newcastle North Stars	Retired	
(Australia) Ben O'Driscoll	Sydney Bears	No team	
(Australia) Joshua O'Neil	Sydney Bears	No team	
(Canada) Jon Olthuis	Melbourne Mustangs	No team	
(United States) Dominic Osman	Newcastle North Stars	Huntsville Havoc	
(Canada) Britt Ouellette	Adelaide Adrenaline	Watertown Privateers	
(Canada) Travis Ouellette	Adelaide Adrenaline	Arizona Sundogs	
(New Zealand) Rick Parry	Adelaide Adrenaline	West Auckland Admirals	
(Australia) Dahlen Phillips	Melbourne Ice	No team	
(United Kingdom) Kevin Phillips	Adelaide Adrenaline	Belfast Giants	
(Australia) Stuart Philps	Canberra Knights	No team	
(United States) Matt Puntureri	Sydney Ice Dogs	Bloomington Thunder	
(Australia) Shai Rabinowitz	Newcastle North Stars	CBR Brave	
(Australia) Joel Rhodes	Sydney Ice Dogs	No team	
(Australia) Denis Ristic	Adelaide Adrenaline	Adelaide Redwings	
(Canada) Ken Rolph	Perth Thunder	Elora Rocks	
(Australia) Ollie Rozdarz	Canberra Knights	No team	
(Australia) Vladimir Rubes	Sydney Bears	No team	
(Australia) Nick Sault	Canberra Knights	No team	
(Australia) Francisco Sevilla	Sydney Bears	ECSL Sting	
(Australia) Carson Sinclair	Adelaide Adrenaline	No team	
(Australia) Chris Slauenwhite	Canberra Knights	Töreboda HF	
(Australia) Charles Smart	Perth Thunder	Ontario Hockey Academy U18	
(Australia) Kane Spence	Sydney Bears	No team	
(Australia) Alec Stephenson	Sydney Ice Dogs	Sydney Wolf Pack	
(Australia) Scott Stephenson	Sydney Ice Dogs	No team	
(Canada) Matt Strueby	Perth Thunder	No team	
(France) Maxime Suzzarini	Canberra Knights	Anglet Hormadi Élite	
(Canada) Mike Thorburn	Melbourne Ice	No team	
(United States) Joe Tolles	Perth Thunder	Arizona Sundogs	
(Australia) David Upton	Newcastle North Stars	No team	
(Estonia) Vadim Virjassov	Melbourne Mustangs	Tallinn Viiking-Sport	
(Slovakia) Frantisek Vlasek	Sydney Ice Dogs	No team	
(Australia) Dillan Wallace	Adelaide Adrenaline	Adelaide Redwings	
(Australia) Cameron Walsh	Perth Thunder	No team	
(Australia) Anthony Wilson	Sydney Ice Dogs	Retired	
(Australia) Andrey Zolotarev	Adelaide Adrenaline	Adelaide Falcons	

== Regular season ==
The regular season started on 12 April 2014 and ran through to 1 September 2014 before the top four teams compete in the Goodall Cup playoff series. Game 35 between the Newcastle North Stars and the Sydney Ice Dogs had to be postponed due to the North Stars bus breaking down en route to Liverpool. The game was later rescheduled for 22 June 2014 and will be played at the Hunter Ice Skating Stadium in Newcastle. Game 77 between the Adelaide Adrenaline and CBR Brave had to be postponed after the Adrenalines team bus crashed en route to the Phillip Ice Skating Centre. Head Coach Ryan O'Handley and some players were taken to hospital however none of the injuries were serious. Game 79 which was set to be held the following day between the Adrenaline and the Sydney Bears was also postponed. On 31 July it was announced that both games had been cancelled as the teams involved had been unable to reschedule the games. As a result, the AIHL Commission awarded each team one point for the cancelled games, with the Adrenaline getting one point from each game and the Brave and Bears awarded one point each from their respective games.

The Melbourne Mustangs won the H Newman Reid Trophy after finishing first in the regular season with 54 points. In the final week of the regular season the AIHL released the list of finalists for the 2014 awards. Mathieu Ouelette of the CBR Brave, Jack Wolgemuth of the Melbourne Mustangs and the Sydney Ice Dogs' Simon Barg were nominated as the Most Valuable Player, with Barg going on to win the award. Petri Pitkänen of the CBR Brave, Mathieu Dugas of the Perth Thunder and the Sydney Bears' Daniel Palmkvist were nominated for the Goaltender of the Year award with Petri Pitkänen being named the winner. Niko Suoraniemi of the Adelaide Adrenaline, John Kennedy of the Newcastle North Stars and the Melbourne Mustangs' Jack Wolgemuth were nominated for the Defenceman of the Year award with Wolgemuth being announced the winner. Jeremy Brown of the Melbourne Ice, Jamie Woodman of the Perth Thunder and the Newcastle North Stars Hayden Sheard were all nominated as the Rookie of the Year award with Jeremy Brown taking the award. David Dunwoodie of the Sydney Ice Dogs won the award for Local Player of the Year.

=== April ===
Game	Date	Time	Away	Score	Home	Location	Attendance	Recap
1	12 April	17:00	Sydney Ice Dogs	9–2	Melbourne Ice	Melbourne	1000	
2	12 April	17:30	Newcastle North Stars	2–0	CBR Brave	Canberra	800	
3	13 April	16:00	Sydney Ice Dogs	3–6	Melbourne Mustangs	Melbourne	800	
4	13 April	17:00	Sydney Bears	4–0	Newcastle North Stars	Newcastle	800	
5	19 April	17:00	Melbourne Mustangs	2 – 3 (SO)	Melbourne Ice	Melbourne	1500	
6	26 April	16:30	Melbourne Ice	3–0	Perth Thunder	Perth		
7	26 April	17:00	Adelaide Adrenaline	4–0	Newcastle North Stars	Newcastle		
8	26 April	17:30	Sydney Ice Dogs	2–6	CBR Brave	Canberra	800	
9	27 April	15:30	Adelaide Adrenaline	6 – 5 (SO)	Sydney Bears	Baulkham Hills	350	
10	27 April	16:30	Melbourne Ice	3–0	Perth Thunder	Perth		

=== May ===
Game	Date	Time	Away	Score	Home	Location	Attendance	Recap
11	3 May	16:30	Perth Thunder	4 – 3 (SO)	Adelaide Adrenaline	Adelaide		
12	3 May	17:00	Sydney Ice Dogs	2–4	Melbourne Mustangs	Melbourne	550	
13	3 May	18:00	Newcastle North Stars	1–3	Sydney Bears	Baulkham Hills	300	
14	4 May	15:30	Perth Thunder	0–1	Adelaide Adrenaline	Adelaide		
15	4 May	16:00	Sydney Ice Dogs	2–5	Melbourne Ice	Melbourne	900	
16	10 May	16:30	Sydney Bears	4 – 3 (SO)	Perth Thunder	Perth		
17	10 May	17:00	Melbourne Ice	5–3	Melbourne Mustangs	Melbourne	1300	
18	10 May	17:00	Newcastle North Stars	5–3	Sydney Ice Dogs	Liverpool	300	
19	10 May	17:30	Adelaide Adrenaline	5–2	CBR Brave	Canberra		
20	11 May	16:30	Sydney Bears	3–2	Perth Thunder	Perth		
21	11 May	17:00	CBR Brave	4–2	Newcastle North Stars	Newcastle		
22	11 May	17:00	Adelaide Adrenaline	4–10	Sydney Ice Dogs	Liverpool	200	
23	17 May	16:30	Newcastle North Stars	6–3	Adelaide Adrenaline	Adelaide		
24	17 May	17:00	Melbourne Ice	6–3	Sydney Ice Dogs	Liverpool		
25	17 May	17:30	Perth Thunder	1–5	CBR Brave	Canberra		
26	17 May	18:00	Melbourne Mustangs	2–1	Sydney Bears	Baulkham Hills	250	
27	18 May	15:30	Newcastle North Stars	2 – 3 (SO)	Adelaide Adrenaline	Adelaide		
28	18 May	15:30	Melbourne Ice	4–2	Sydney Bears	Baulkham Hills	250	
29	18 May	17:00	Melbourne Mustangs	2–7	Sydney Ice Dogs	Liverpool	250	
30	18 May	17:00	Perth Thunder	4 – 5 (SO)	CBR Brave	Canberra		
31	24 May	17:00	Adelaide Adrenaline	2–6	Melbourne Mustangs	Melbourne	450	
32	24 May	17:00	CBR Brave	5–2	Newcastle North Stars	Newcastle	700	
33	24 May	18:00	Sydney Ice Dogs	6–2	Sydney Bears	Baulkham Hills	850	
34	25 May	16:00	Adelaide Adrenaline	3–2	Melbourne Mustangs	Melbourne	300	
36	31 May	16:30	Sydney Ice Dogs	5–7	Adelaide Adrenaline	Adelaide		
37	31 May	17:00	Perth Thunder	2–5	Melbourne Mustangs	Melbourne	500	
38	31 May	17:30	Melbourne Ice	2 – 1 (SO)	CBR Brave	Canberra	800	

=== June ===
Game	Date	Time	Away	Score	Home	Location	Attendance	Recap
39	1 June	15:30	Sydney Ice Dogs	2–0	Adelaide Adrenaline	Adelaide		
40	1 June	15:30	Newcastle North Stars	4–1	Sydney Bears	Baulkham Hills	300	
41	1 June	16:00	Perth Thunder	4–1	Melbourne Mustangs	Melbourne	350	
42	1 June	17:00	Melbourne Ice	2–4	CBR Brave	Canberra		
43	5 June	16:00	Melbourne Mustangs	8–3	Melbourne Ice	Melbourne	1200	
44	7 June	16:30	Adelaide Adrenaline	1–7	Perth Thunder	Perth		
45	7 June	17:00	Melbourne Mustangs	2–5	Newcastle North Stars	Newcastle	900	
46	7 June	17:30	Sydney Bears	1–4	CBR Brave	Canberra	800	
47	8 June	15:30	Melbourne Mustangs	5–3	Sydney Bears	Baulkham Hills		
48	8 June	16:30	Adelaide Adrenaline	2–6	Perth Thunder	Perth		
49	14 June	17:00	Melbourne Ice	4–7	Newcastle North Stars	Newcastle		
50	14 June	17:30	Sydney Bears	6–8	CBR Brave	Canberra		
51	15 June	15:30	Melbourne Ice	6–4	Sydney Bears	Baulkham Hills	450	
52	15 June	17:00	CBR Brave	3–6	Sydney Ice Dogs	Liverpool	220	
53	21 June	16:30	Melbourne Mustangs	5–3	Adelaide Adrenaline	Adelaide		
54	21 June	17:00	Perth Thunder	5–0	Newcastle North Stars	Newcastle		
55	21 June	16:30	Sydney Bears	1–2	Sydney Ice Dogs	Liverpool	300	
56	21 June	17:00	CBR Brave	2 – 3 (SO)	Melbourne Ice	Melbourne	1000	
35	22 June	17:00	Newcastle North Stars	4–1	Sydney Ice Dogs	Newcastle		
57	22 June	15:30	Perth Thunder	5–6	Sydney Bears	Baulkham Hills	300	
58	22 June	15:30	Melbourne Mustangs	6–3	Adelaide Adrenaline	Adelaide		
59	22 June	16:00	CBR Brave	6 – 5 (SO)	Melbourne Ice	Melbourne	1000	
60	28 June	17:00	Sydney Bears	3–1	Melbourne Ice	Melbourne	950	
61	28 June	17:00	Adelaide Adrenaline	6–2	Newcastle North Stars	Newcastle		
62	28 June	17:30	Sydney Ice Dogs	4–1	CBR Brave	Canberra	900	
63	29 June	16:00	Sydney Bears	2–1	Melbourne Mustangs	Melbourne	850	
64	29 June	17:00	Adelaide Adrenaline	3 – 2 (SO)	Sydney Ice Dogs	Liverpool	350	

=== July ===
Game	Date	Time	Away	Score	Home	Location	Attendance	Recap
65	5 July	16:30	Newcastle North Stars	5–7	Perth Thunder	Perth		
66	5 July	16:30	Melbourne Ice	0–4	Adelaide Adrenaline	Adelaide		
67	5 July	17:00	CBR Brave	7–4	Melbourne Mustangs	Melbourne	700	
68	5 July	17:00	Sydney Bears	2–4	Sydney Ice Dogs	Liverpool	400	
69	6 July	15:30	Melbourne Ice	2 – 3 (SO)	Adelaide Adrenaline	Adelaide		
70	6 July	16:00	CBR Brave	3–4	Melbourne Mustangs	Melbourne	380	
71	6 July	16:30	Newcastle North Stars	1–4	Perth Thunder	Perth		
72	12 July	17:00	Sydney Bears	0–4	Melbourne Mustangs	Melbourne	450	
73	12 July	17:00	CBR Brave	4–5	Sydney Ice Dogs	Liverpool	450	
74	13 July	16:00	Sydney Bears	1–10	Melbourne Ice	Melbourne		
75	13 July	17:00	Sydney Ice Dogs	5 – 4 (SO)	Newcastle North Stars	Newcastle	700	
76	19 July	17:00	Newcastle North Stars	3–6	Melbourne Mustangs	Melbourne	700	
77	19 July	17:30	Adelaide Adrenaline	Cancelled	CBR Brave	Canberra		^{[note 1]}
78	19 July	18:00	Perth Thunder	4–1	Sydney Bears	Baulkham Hills	300	
79	20 July	15:30	Adelaide Adrenaline	Cancelled	Sydney Bears	Baulkham Hills		^{[note 1]}
80	20 July	16:00	Newcastle North Stars	4–5	Melbourne Ice	Melbourne		
81	20 July	17:00	Perth Thunder	3–5	Sydney Ice Dogs	Liverpool	250	
82	26 July	16:30	CBR Brave	3–1	Perth Thunder	Perth		
83	26 July	16:30	Sydney Bears	4–6	Adelaide Adrenaline	Adelaide		
84	26 July	17:00	Melbourne Ice	2–4	Newcastle North Stars	Newcastle		
85	27 July	15:30	Sydney Bears	1–8	Adelaide Adrenaline	Adelaide		
86	27 July	16:30	CBR Brave	5–3	Perth Thunder	Perth		
87	27 July	17:00	Melbourne Ice	3–2	Sydney Ice Dogs	Liverpool	300	

=== August ===
Game	Date	Time	Away	Score	Home	Location	Attendance	Recap
88	2 August	16:30	Melbourne Mustangs	3–1	Perth Thunder	Perth		
89	2 August	17:30	Newcastle North Stars	2–3	CBR Brave	Canberra		
90	3 August	15:30	CBR Brave	12–4	Sydney Bears	Baulkham Hills	250	
91	3 August	16:30	Melbourne Mustangs	7–4	Perth Thunder	Perth	500	
92	3 August	17:00	Sydney Ice Dogs	3–5	Newcastle North Stars	Newcastle		
93	9 August	17:00	Adelaide Adrenaline	2–4	Melbourne Ice	Melbourne		
94	9 August	17:00	Perth Thunder	4–5	Newcastle North Stars	Newcastle		
95	9 August	17:30	Melbourne Mustangs	4–2	CBR Brave	Canberra		
96	9 August	18:00	Sydney Ice Dogs	8–0	Sydney Bears	Baulkham Hills	400	
97	10 August	16:00	Adelaide Adrenaline	1–3	Melbourne Ice	Melbourne		
98	10 August	17:00	Melbourne Mustangs	2–4	CBR Brave	Canberra		
99	10 August	17:00	Perth Thunder	8–2	Sydney Ice Dogs	Liverpool	250	
100	10 August	17:00	Sydney Bears	2–6	Newcastle North Stars	Newcastle		
101	14 August	17:00	Melbourne Ice	5–1	Melbourne Mustangs	Melbourne	1500	
102	16 August	16:30	Sydney Ice Dogs	3–1	Perth Thunder	Perth		
103	16 August	16:30	CBR Brave	2–5	Adelaide Adrenaline	Adelaide		
104	16 August	17:00	Newcastle North Stars	3–6	Melbourne Mustangs	Melbourne	900	
105	17 August	15:30	CBR Brave	2–6	Adelaide Adrenaline	Adelaide		
106	17 August	16:00	Newcastle North Stars	2–7	Melbourne Ice	Melbourne		
107	17 August	16:30	Sydney Ice Dogs	6–3	Perth Thunder	Perth		
108	23 August	17:00	Perth Thunder	5 – 4 (SO)	Melbourne Ice	Melbourne		
109	23 August	17:00	Melbourne Mustangs	4–1	Newcastle North Stars	Newcastle		
110	23 August	18:00	CBR Brave	3–2	Sydney Bears	Baulkham Hills		
111	24 August	16:00	Perth Thunder	3–2	Melbourne Ice	Melbourne	550	
112	24 August	17:00	Melbourne Mustangs	3 – 4 (SO)	Sydney Ice Dogs	Liverpool	550	

=== Standings ===
Team	GP	W	OTW	T	OTL	L	GF	GA	GDF	PTS
Melbourne Mustangs	28	17	0	0	3	8	108	88	+20	54
Melbourne Ice	28	14	3	0	3	8	104	88	+16	51
CBR Brave	28	14	2	1	2	9	106	89	+17	49
Sydney Ice Dogs	28	14	2	0	1	11	116	97	+19	47
Adelaide Adrenaline	28	10	5	2	1	10	94	90	+4	43
Newcastle North Stars	28	11	0	0	2	15	87	106	−19	35
Perth Thunder	28	9	2	0	2	15	94	94	0	33
Sydney Bears	28	6	1	1	1	19	68	125	−57	22

Qualified for the Goodall Cup playoffs	H Newman Reid Trophy winners

=== Statistics ===
==== Scoring leaders ====
List shows the ten top skaters sorted by points, then goals.

Player	Team	GP	G	A	Pts	PIM	POS
Simon Barg	Sydney Ice Dogs	26	23	46	69	20	F
Stephen Blunden	CBR Brave	24	36	32	68	59	F
Anton Kokkonen	CBR Brave	25	17	42	59	18	F
Mathieu Ouellette	CBR Brave	22	17	40	57	16	F
David Dunwoodie	Sydney Ice Dogs	28	20	33	53	151	F
Chris Wilson	Newcastle North Stars	23	17	32	49	96	F
Cody Danberg	Newcastle North Stars	28	17	31	48	77	F
John Clewlow	Sydney Ice Dogs	23	22	23	45	64	F
Patrick O'Kane	Melbourne Mustangs	28	21	23	44	14	F
Stuart Stefan	Perth Thunder	28	14	30	44	40	F

==== Leading goaltenders ====
Only the top five goaltenders, based on save percentage with a minimum 40% of the teams ice time.

Player	Team	MIP	SOG	GA	GAA	SVS%	SO
Mathieu Dugas	Perth Thunder	1396	1099	92	3.30	0.916	1
Jaden Pine-Murphy	Melbourne Ice	876	446	39	2.23	0.913	2
Petri Pitkänen	CBR Brave	1227	764	72	2.93	0.906	0
Daniel Palmkvist	Sydney Bears	1040	806	80	3.85	0.901	1
Harrison May	Newcastle North Stars	1295	881	89	3.44	0.899	1

=== Season awards ===
Below lists the 2014 AIHL regular season award winners.

Award	Name	Team
MVP	(Canada) Simon Barg	Sydney Ice Dogs
Goaltender	(Finland) Petri Pitkänen	CBR Brave
Defenceman	(United States) Jack Wolgemuth	Melbourne Mustangs
Rookie	(Australia) Jeremy Brown	Melbourne Ice
Local player	(Australia) David Dunwoodie	Sydney Ice Dogs

== Goodall Cup playoffs ==
The 2014 playoffs started on 30 August 2014, with the Goodall Cup final being held on 31 August. Following the end of the regular season the top four teams advanced to the playoff series with the Melbourne Mustangs and CBR Brave making their debut playoff appearance, along with the other two finalists the Melbourne Ice and Sydney Ice Dogs. All three games were held at the Medibank Icehouse in Docklands, Victoria, the home of the Melbourne Ice and Melbourne Mustangs. The series was a single game elimination with the two winning semi-finalists advancing to the Goodall Cup final. The finals were sponsored by Air Canada who also sponsored the 2013 playoffs. The Melbourne Mustangs won the Goodall Cup for the first time after defeating the Melbourne Ice in the final. Viktor Gibbs Sjödin of the Melbourne Mustangs was named the finals MVP.

Semifinals
1	Melbourne Mustangs	6
4	Sydney Ice Dogs	4
3	CBR Brave	1
2	Melbourne Ice	6

Final
Melbourne Mustangs	6
Melbourne Ice	1

=== Semi-finals ===
All times are UTC+10:00

30 August 2014; 15:00	Sydney Ice Dogs	4–6 (2–1, 0–2, 2–3)	Melbourne Mustangs	Medibank Icehouse; Attendance: 1500

Game reference

Tim Noting
Goalies
Fraser Carson
Referee:
Jeff Scott
Linesmen:
Joe Mayer
Daryl Hamilton

	0 – 1	3:17 – Grant (J. Hughes, Jones)
Bye (Tesarik, Malloy) – 7:22	1 – 1
Dunwoodie (PP) (Clewlow, Ward) – 11:54	2 – 1
	2 – 2	16:02 – Bourke (Gibbs Sjödin, Wolgemuth)
	2 – 3	17:57 – J. Hughes (PP) (Grant)
Clewlow (Tesarik, Bye) – 37:06	3 – 3
	3 – 4	41:50 – Gibbs Sjödin (Bourke, O'Kane)
	3 – 5	43:02 – Gibbs Sjödin (Bourke, O'Kane)
Dunwoodie (PP) (Malloy, Barg) – 47:49	4 – 5
	4 – 6	49:35 – Bourke (EN) (Gibbs Sjödin)

8 min
Penalties
6 min
22
Shots
35

30 August 2014; 18:30	CBR Brave	1–6 (0–2, 1–2, 0–2)	Melbourne Ice	Medibank Icehouse; Attendance: 1500

Game reference

Petri Pitkanen
Goalies
Jaden Pine-Murphy
Referee:
Rick West
Linesmen:
Matthew Taylor
Casper Russell-Huber

	0 – 1	6:45 – Powell (Hamilton)
	0 – 2	8:58 – Graham (PP) (Powell, Humphries)
	0 – 3	18:27 – Armstrong (Johansson)
Blunden (Kokkonen) – 19:10	1 – 3
	1 – 4	21:54 – J. Smith (PP) (Powell, Brown)
	1 – 5	46:43 – Johansson (Brown, Webster)
	1 – 6	48:24 – Powell (PP) (Brown)

24 min
Penalties
14 min
23
Shots
40

=== Final ===
31 August 2014; 15:00	Melbourne Ice	1–6 (0–1, 0–3, 1–2)	Melbourne Mustangs	Medibank Icehouse; Attendance: 2000

Game reference

Jaden Pine-Murphy
Goalies
Fraser Carson
Referee:
Rick West
Jeff Scott
Linesmen:
Daryl Hamilton
Joe Mayer

	0 – 1	6:53 – Gibbs Sjödin (Bourke)
	0 – 2	18:23 – Bourke (Gibbs Sjödin)
	0 – 3	19:54 – Gibbs Sjödin (Bourke)
	0 – 4	27:43 – O'Kane (Wolgemuth, Bourke)
	0 – 5	30:42 – Gibbs Sjödin (J.Hughes, O'Kane)
Webster (Baclig, Powell) – 32:47	1 – 5
	1 – 6	47:15 – A. Belic (V.Hughes, Stringer)

16 min
Penalties
16 min
30
Shots
30

== Notes ==
1: Game 77 between the Adelaide Adrenaline and CBR Brave was cancelled after the Adrenalines team bus crashed en route to the Phillip Ice Skating Centre. Game 79 which was set to be held the following day between the Adrenaline and the Sydney Bears was also cancelled. The games which were initially postponed were announced by the AIHL as cancelled after the teams involved had been unable to reschedule the games. As a result, the AIHL Commission awarded each team one point for the cancelled games, with the Adrenaline getting one point from each game and the Brave and Bears awarded one point each from their respective games.
