= 2009 AIHL season =

- League: Australian Ice Hockey League
- Sport: Ice hockey
- Duration: 25 April 2009 – 30 August 2009

Regular season
- H Newman Reid Trophy: Newcastle North Stars (2nd title)
- Season MVP: Brad Smulders (Blue Tongues)
- Top scorer: Brad Smulders (76 points) (Blue Tongues)

Goodall Cup
- Champions: Adelaide Adrenaline
- Runners-up: Newcastle North Stars
- Finals MVP: Cass Delsar (Adrenaline)

AIHL seasons
- ← 2008 2010 →

The 2009 AIHL season was the tenth season of the Australian Ice Hockey League (AIHL). It ran from 25 April 2009 until 23 August 2009, with the AIHL finals following on 29 and 30 August 2009. The Newcastle North Stars won the H Newman Reid Trophy (backdated) after finishing the regular season first in the league standings. Adelaide Adrenaline won the Goodall Cup (backdated) for the first time by defeating the Newcastle North Stars in the final.

== League business ==
The 2009 season will be reduced to seven teams after the Central Coast Rhinos dropped out due to changes made in the licensing model. Two teams were renamed for the start of the season, Western Sydney Ice Dogs, dropped the Western part of the title to become the Sydney Ice Dogs and the Adelaide A's have been renamed for the start of the season, playing under the new name of Adelaide Adrenaline. The Sydney Ice Dogs have also been forced to relocate to Liverpool's Catholic Club's ice rink after their former home at Baulkham Hills rink withdrew from the league.

On 25–26 July there was a week's break for the Junior Men's national tournament, known as the Brown Tournament.

== Regular season ==
Game No.	Home team	Score	Away team	Location	Date	Report
1	Sydney	6–1	Gold Coast	Liverpool	Saturday, 25 April	
2	Canberra	5–2	Bears	Canberra	Saturday, 25 April	
3	Newcastle	5–3	Sydney	Newcastle	Sunday, 26 April	
4	Bears	0–7	Gold Coast	Penrith	Sunday, 26 April	
Game No.	Home team	Score	Away team	Location	Date	Report
5	Melbourne Ice	3–4	Newcastle	Melbourne	Saturday, 2 May	
6	Bears	1–5	Sydney	Penrith	Saturday, 2 May	
7	Adelaide	7–3	Newcastle	Adelaide	Sunday, 3 May	
8	Sydney	2–3 SO	Canberra	Liverpool	Sunday, 3 May	
Game No.	Home team	Score	Away team	Location	Date	Report
9	Canberra	1–5	Melbourne	Canberra	Saturday, 9 May	
11	Newcastle	5–1	Gold Coast	Newcastle	Saturday, 9 May	
12	Sydney	6–1	Bears	Liverpool	Saturday, 9 May	
13	Newcastle	8–5	Gold Coast	Newcastle	Sunday, 10 May	
14	Bears	4–3 SO	Melbourne	Penrith	Sunday, 10 May	
Game No.	Home team	Score	Away team	Location	Date	Report
39	Gold Coast	2–3 SO	Newcastle	Gold Coast	Saturday, 16 May	
16	Adelaide	8–1	Canberra	Adelaide	Saturday, 16 May	
42	Gold Coast	4–5 SO	Newcastle	Gold Coast	Sunday, 17 May	
18	Melbourne	5–2	Canberra	Melbourne	Sunday, 17 May	
41	Bears	1–5	Sydney	Penrith	Sunday, 17 May	
Game No.	Home team	Score	Away team	Location	Date	Report
20	Gold Coast	8–4	Bears	Gold Coast	Saturday, 23 May	
21	Canberra	5–8	Newcastle	Canberra	Saturday, 23 May	
22	Melbourne	2–5	Adelaide	Melbourne	Saturday, 23 May	
23	Gold Coast	9–5	Bears	Gold Coast	Sunday, 24 May	
24	Melbourne	2–4	Adelaide	Melbourne	Sunday, 24 May	
25	Sydney	1–3	Canberra	Liverpool	Sunday, 24 May	
Game No.	Home team	Score	Away team	Location	Date	Report
26	Canberra	2–5	Newcastle	Canberra	Saturday, 30 May	
27	Melbourne	4–5 SO	Sydney	Melbourne	Saturday, 30 May	
28	Adelaide	8–3	Sydney	Adelaide	Sunday, 31 May	
Game No.	Home team	Score	Away team	Location	Date	Report
30	Gold Coast	4–2	Adelaide	Gold Coast	Saturday, 6 June	
31	Newcastle	7–3	Bears	Newcastle	Saturday, 6 June	
10	Canberra	2–5	Melbourne	Canberra	Saturday, 6 June	
33	Gold Coast	5–2	Adelaide	Gold Coast	Sunday, 7 June	
34	Bears	3–5	Melbourne	Penrith	Sunday, 7 June	
Game No.	Home team	Score	Away team	Location	Date	Report
35	Adelaide	4–2	Bears	Adelaide	Saturday, 13 June	
36	Canberra	6–3	Sydney	Canberra	Saturday, 13 June	
37	Melbourne	6–0	Bears	Melbourne	Sunday, 14 June	
38	Sydney	4–6	Newcastle	Liverpool	Sunday, 14 June	
Game No.	Home team	Score	Away team	Location	Date	Report
15	Gold Coast	9–2	Sydney	Gold Coast	Saturday, 20 June	
40	Adelaide	5–1	Canberra	Adelaide	Saturday, 20 June	
19	Bears	2–6	Newcastle	Penrith	Saturday, 20 June	
17	Gold Coast	8–4	Sydney	Gold Coast	Sunday, 21 June	
43	Melbourne	8–3	Canberra	Melbourne	Sunday, 21 June	
Game No.	Home team	Score	Away team	Location	Date	Report
44	Adelaide	5–2	Melbourne	Adelaide	Saturday, 27 June	
45	Newcastle	9–4	Canberra	Newcastle	Saturday, 27 June	
46	Sydney	4–1	Gold Coast	Liverpool	Saturday, 27 June	
47	Adelaide	1–4	Melbourne	Adelaide	Sunday, 28 June	
48	Bears	3–2 SO	Gold Coast	Penrith	Sunday, 28 June	
49	Newcastle	3–2	Sydney	Newcastle	Sunday, 28 June	
Game No.	Home team	Score	Away team	Location	Date	Report
50	Newcastle	3–4	Adelaide	Newcastle	Saturday, 4 July	
51	Canberra	1–4	Sydney	Canberra	Saturday, 4 July	
52	Melbourne	3–4 SO	Gold Coast	Melbourne	Saturday, 4 July	
53	Melbourne	5–4	Gold Coast	Melbourne	Sunday, 5 July	
54	Sydney	5–3	Adelaide	Liverpool	Sunday, 5 July	
29	Bears	2–7	Newcastle	Penrith	Sunday, 5 July	
Game No.	Home team	Score	Away team	Location	Date	Report
55	Melbourne	2–5	Newcastle	Melbourne	Saturday, 11 July	
56	Canberra	1–5	Gold Coast	Canberra	Saturday, 11 July	
57	Sydney	5–3	Bears	Liverpool	Saturday, 11 July	
58	Adelaide	5–7	Newcastle	Adelaide	Sunday, 12 July	
59	Canberra	1–3	Gold Coast	Canberra	Sunday, 12 July	
Game No.	Home team	Score	Away team	Location	Date	Report
60	Adelaide	9–3	Gold Coast	Adelaide	Saturday, 18 July	
61 & 62	Newcastle	3–7	Melbourne	Newcastle	Saturday, 18 July	
63	Adelaide	2–4	Gold Coast	Adelaide	Sunday, 19 July	
64	Bears	5–4 SO	Canberra	Penrith	Sunday, 19 July	
65 & 32	Sydney	3–5	Melbourne	Liverpool	Sunday, 19 July	
Game No.	Home team	Score	Away team	Location	Date	Report
66	Gold Coast	3–6	Canberra	Gold Coast	Saturday, 1 August	
67	Adelaide	7–3	Bears	Adelaide	Saturday, 1 August	
68	Gold Coast	5–1	Canberra	Gold Coast	Sunday, 2 August	
69	Melbourne	10–3	Bears	Melbourne	Sunday, 2 August	
70	Sydney	3–2	Newcastle	Liverpool	Sunday, 2 August	
Game No.	Home team	Score	Away team	Location	Date	Report
71	Newcastle	5–3	Adelaide	Newcastle	Saturday, 8 August	
72	Canberra	6–4	Bears	Canberra	Saturday, 8 August	
73 & 74	Bears	3–7	Adelaide	Penrith	Sunday, 9 August	
Game No.	Home team	Score	Away team	Location	Date	Report
75	Gold Coast	5–2	Melbourne	Gold Coast	Saturday, 15 August	
76 & 77	Canberra	1–6	Adelaide	Canberra	Saturday, 15 August	
84	Newcastle	5–3	Bears	Newcastle	Sunday, 23 August	
78	Gold Coast	4–9	Melbourne	Gold Coast	Sunday, 16 August	
79	Sydney	5–6 OT	Adelaide	Liverpool	Sunday, 16 August	
80	Newcastle	5–2	Canberra	Newcastle	Sunday, 16 August	
Game No.	Home team	Score	Away team	Location	Date	Report
81	Adelaide	1–3	Sydney	Adelaide	Saturday, 22 August	
82	Bears	6–4	Canberra	Penrith	Saturday, 22 August	
83	Melbourne	4–1	Sydney	Melbourne	Sunday, 23 August	

Note: "SO" indicates that a game was won through a shootout. Games schedule sourced from the AIHL.

=== Standings ===
Team	GP	W	SOW	SOL	L	GF	GA	GDF	PTS
Newcastle North Stars	24	17	2	0	5	122	85	+37	55
Melbourne Ice	24	15	0	3	6	113	77	+36	48
Adelaide Adrenaline	24	15	1	0	8	117	75	+42	47
Gold Coast Blue Tongues	24	13	1	3	7	108	86	+22	44
Sydney Ice Dogs	24	10	1	2	11	87	90	−3	34
Canberra Knights	24	4	1	1	18	60	120	−60	15
The Bears	24	1	3	0	20	66	140	−74	9

Qualified for the AIHL playoffs	H Newman Reid Trophy winners

=== Statistics ===
==== Scoring leaders ====
List shows the ten top skaters sorted by points, then goals.

Player	Team	GP	G	A	Pts	PIM	POS
Brad Smulders	Gold Coast Blue Tongues	22	33	43	76	8	F
Éric Lafrenière	Newcastle North Stars	22	27	30	57	6	F
Matthew Watkins	Melbourne Ice	22	25	29	54	8	C
Adrian Saul	Newcastle North Stars	22	14	37	51	28	F
John Halverson	Newcastle North Stars	23	31	17	48	106	D
Lliam Webster	Melbourne Ice	22	18	28	46	79	F
Steven Kaye	Newcastle North Stars	17	18	27	45	30	F
André Selander	Gold Coast Blue Tongues	20	22	18	40	93	LW
Jassi Sangha	Sydney Ice Dogs	20	17	20	37	87	LW
Vladimir Rubes	The Bears	19	16	20	36	35	F

==== Leading goaltenders ====
Only the top five goaltenders, based on save percentage.

Player	Team	MIP	SOG	GA	GAA	SVS%	SO
Matthew Ezzy	Newcastle North Stars	928	645	71	3.68	0.890	0
Olivier Martin	Adelaide Adrenaline	989	604	69	3.49	0.886	0
Luke Fiveash	Gold Coast Blue Tongues	607	356	42	3.46	0.882	1
Stuart Denman	Melbourne Ice	965	496	65	3.37	0.869	1
James Herbert	Sydney Ice Dogs	871	430	63	3.62	0.853	0

== Playoffs ==
In 2009, the Goodall Cup, celebrating 100 years of existence, had been taken back from Ice Hockey Australia (IHA) for an amateur interstate tournament and was replaced by the AIHL with the newly commissioned AIHL Champions Trophy.

The 2009 playoffs was scheduled for 29 August 2009 with Championship final held on 30 August 2009. Following the end of the regular season the top four teams advanced to the playoff series which was held at Hunter Ice Skating Stadium in Warners Bay, Newcastle, New South Wales. The series was a single game elimination with the two winning semi-finalists advancing to the Championship final. The inaugural AIHL Champions Trophy was won by the Adelaide Adrenaline who defeated the Newcastle North Stars 3–2 in overtime after the two sides finished regulation time locked at 2–2. Adelaide's Cass Delsar, was named the finals most valuable player (MVP) after scoring the overtime winner.

In March 2010, the AIHL and IHA agreed to reinstate the Goodall Cup as the ultimate prize of the AIHL and backdated Adelaide Adrenaline's 2009 championship to the Goodall Cup (first title), etching the South Australian team's name on the cup and officially calling them the 2009 Goodall Cup champions.

Semifinals
1	Melbourne Ice	1
4	Adelaide Adrenaline	6
3	Newcastle North Stars	5
2	Gold Coast Blue Tongues	3

Final
Adelaide Adrenaline	3
Newcastle North Stars	2

All times are UTC+10:00

=== Semi-finals ===
29 August 2009; 16:30	Adelaide Adrenaline	6–1 (2–0, 3–1, 1–0)	Melbourne Ice	Hunter Ice Skating Stadium, Newcastle

Game reference

Olivier Martin
Goalies
Stuart Denman
Referee:
Gordon Young
Linesmen:
Jason Forbes
Jim McIntosh

Mantere (Oddy)	1 – 0
Beirnes (PP) (Keane, Thilthorpe)	2 – 0
Beirnes (Delsar)	3 – 0
Mantere (Oddy, Greer)	4 – 0
	4 – 1	Webster (PP) (Watkins, Seckington)
Werner (PP) (Morgan, Mantere)	5 – 1
Werner (Darge, Keane)	6 – 1

14 min
Penalties
26 min
34
Shots
25

29 August 2009; 20:00	Gold Coast Blue Tongues	3–5 (2–2, 1–1, 0–2)	Newcastle North Stars	Hunter Ice Skating Stadium, Newcastle; Attendance: 1000

Game reference

Milan Novysedlak
Goalies
Matthew Ezzy
Referee:
Jeff Scott
Linesmen:
Darren Hardy-Hawken
Rick West

	0 – 1	Kaye (PP) (Lafrenière, Saul)
	0 – 2	Halverson (SH) (Saul, Starke)
Ivarsson (PP) (Smulders, Selander)	1 – 2
Selander (PP) (Smulders, Upton)	2 – 2
Smulders (SH) (Ivarsson)	3 – 2
	3 – 3	Morrisson (Murrell)
	3 – 4	Kaye (Price, Saul)
	3 – 5	Kaye (Saul, Lafrenière)

18 min
Penalties
14 min
29
Shots
39

=== Final ===
30 August 2009; 16:00	Adelaide Adrenaline	3 – 2 (OT) (2–1, 0–1, 0–0, 1–0)	Newcastle North Stars	Hunter Ice Skating Stadium, Newcastle; Attendance: 950

Game reference

Olivier Martin
Goalies
Matthew Ezzy
Referee:
Jeff Scott
Linesmen:
Rick West
Jason Forbes

	0 – 1	Halverson (Sheffield)
Morgan (PP) (Harding, Werner)	1 – 1
Oddy (PP) (Werner)	2 – 1
	2 – 2	Halverson (PP) (Kaye, Saul)
Delsar (Beirnes, Harding)	3 – 2

16 min
Penalties
18 min
34
Shots
17
