= 2012 AIHL season =

- League: Australian Ice Hockey League
- Sport: Ice hockey
- Duration: 28 April 2012 – 2 September 2012

Regular season
- H Newman Reid Trophy: Newcastle North Stars (4th title)
- Season MVP: Jeremy Boyer (North Stars); Tomas Landa (Bears)
- Top scorer: Jeremy Boyer (North Stars); Tomas Landa (Bears) (58 points)

Goodall Cup
- Champions: Melbourne Ice
- Runners-up: Newcastle North Stars
- Finals MVP: Todd Graham (Ice)

AIHL seasons
- 2011 2013

The 2012 AIHL season is the 13th season of the Australian Ice Hockey League (AIHL). It ran from 28 April 2012 until 26 August 2012, with the Goodall Cup finals following on the 1 and 2 September. The Newcastle North Stars won the H Newman Ried Trophy after finishing the regular season with the most points. The Melbourne Ice won the Goodall Cup for the third year in a row after defeating the North Stars in the final.

== Teams ==
In 2012 the AIHL had 9 teams competing in the league.

2012 AIHL teams
| Team | City | Arena | Head Coach | Captain |
|---|---|---|---|---|
| Adelaide Adrenaline | (South Australia) Adelaide | IceArenA | (Australia) Ryan O'Handley | (Australia) Greg Oddy |
| Canberra Knights | (Australian Capital Territory) Canberra | Phillip Ice Skating Centre | (Australia) Bear McPhail | (Australia) Mark Rummukainen |
| Gold Coast Blue Tongues | (Queensland) Gold Coast | Iceworld Boondall | (Australia) Peter Nixon | (Australia) Adam Geric |
| Melbourne Ice | (Victoria (state)) Melbourne | Medibank Icehouse | (Australia) Paul Watson | (Australia) Vinnie Hughes |
| Melbourne Mustangs | (Victoria (state)) Melbourne | Medibank Icehouse | (Canada) Bill Wilkinson | (Australia) Shane Hardy |
| Newcastle North Stars | (New South Wales) Newcastle | Hunter Ice Skating Stadium | (Australia) Garry Doré | (Canada) Ray Sheffield |
| Perth Thunder | (Western Australia) Perth | Perth Ice Arena | (United Kingdom) Stan Scott | (Australia) Samuel Wilson |
| Sydney Bears | (New South Wales) Sydney | Sydney Ice Arena | (Australia) Vladimir Rubes | (Australia) Michael Schlamp |
| Sydney Ice Dogs | (New South Wales) Sydney | Liverpool Catholic Club Ice Rink | (Australia) Ron Kuprowsky | (Australia) Andrew White |

== League business ==
During the off-season the Australian Ice Hockey League announced that Perth Thunder had been accepted as a full member of the league expanding the competition to nine teams. The Mustangs IHC changed their name to the Melbourne Mustangs after the AIHL lifted a condition that prohibited the use of "Melbourne" in their team name. The restriction was originally put in place to protect the brand of the Melbourne Ice. It was also announced that from 2012 the league would be split into two conferences in order to manage costs and length of the season. The two conferences where named the Bauer Conference and Easton Conference after the AIHL signed a three-year deal with the Skaters Network who is the distributor of the ice hockey brands Bauer Hockey and Easton Hockey. The Bauer Conference will consist of the Canberra Knights, Newcastle North Stars, Sydney Bears, and the Sydney Ice Dogs, while the Easton Conference includes the Adelaide Adrenaline, Gold Coast Blue Tongues, Melbourne Ice, Melbourne Mustangs and the Perth Thunder. Following the announcement of the conference system a change in the finals playoff structure was also announced. The winners of each conference at the end of the regular season would play in a semi-final against the runner-up of the opposing conference with the winners of the semi-finals progressing to the Goodall Cup final. It was also announced a one-year partnership with Virgin Australia in which the airline would become the leagues preferred supplier for the 2012 season. In February 2012 the Sydney Bears announced that they were leaving the Penrith Ice Palace as their home arena and were returning to play their games at the Sydney Ice Arena in Baulkham Hills where they had previously played from 2003 to 2006. In April 2012 the AIHL announced that the Sydney Ice Dogs would be restricted to the dress of only three import players per game, as opposed to the normal four. The restriction is part of the penalties imposed on the club after it breached the AIHL code of conduct during the 2011 Goodall Cup final series in which a player and two team officials were involved in an assault of a Medibank Icehouse security guard.

Prior to the start of the regular season, three exhibition games were held. The first game was held between the Mustangs and the Melbourne Ice at the Medibank Icehouse with the Mustangs winning the game 5–2. The second and third games were played between the Sydney Bears and the Sydney Ice Dogs, with the Sydney Bears winning the first game 5–2 and the Sydney Ice Dogs winning the second game 5–4 in a shootout.

On 3 June, Gold Coast Blue Tongues' home game against the Melbourne Ice at Bundall Iceland was called off after a shortened first period due to an unplayable surface; it was the second such cancellation in less than a year at Bundall Iceland, with 10 July 2011 match between the Blue Tongues and Sydney Ice Dogs cancelled without play for the same reason. After the cancelled game, Gold Coast was evicted from the rink by its owners, and on 8 June, it was announced that its remaining seven home games for the season would be played at Iceworld in Acacia Ridge, Brisbane; the matches will begin at 10:30pm, with a better time unable to be negotiated with the rink due to the short notice of the relocation. Although Melbourne was offered a win by forfeit for the cancelled match, the club agreed instead to reschedule the match to Thursday 23 August, to be played in Melbourne (although technically a Gold Coast home game).

During July there will be a weeks break for the first Trans-Tasman Champions League. The formation of the Trans-Tasman Champions League was announced back in August 2011 between the AIHL and the New Zealand Ice Hockey League (NZIHL). The series will feature two teams from each the AIHL and the NZIHL each playing the others once with the winner being the team who finishes first in the round-robin standings. The two teams chosen from each league will be the 2011 regular season champions and the winner of the 2011 playoffs. In a situation where the winning of both events is the same the runner up of the playoff final will be selected to represent their respective league.

=== Player transfers ===
| Date | Player | Previous team | New team | Ref |
|---|---|---|---|---|
| 15 February 2012 | (Australia) Matthew Ezzy | Newcastle North Stars | Retired | |
| 29 February 2012 | (Australia) Olivier Martin | Adelaide Adrenaline | Newcastle North Stars | |
| 9 March 2012 | (Canada) Dan Nicholls | Texas Brahmas | Adelaide Adrenaline | |
| 14 March 2012 | (Canada) Brett Liscomb | New Jersey Outlaws | Adelaide Adrenaline | |
| 14 March 2012 | (Australia) Wehebe Darge | Alaska Avalanche | Adelaide Adrenaline | |
| 14 March 2012 | (Australia) David Manning | SUNY-Potsdam | Adelaide Adrenaline | |
| 14 March 2012 | (Australia) Darren Corstens | Viikingit | Adelaide Adrenaline | |
| 14 March 2012 | (Czech Republic) Tomas Landa | HC Risuty | Sydney Bears | |
| 19 March 2012 | (Canada) Aaron Barton | University of Ottawa | Adelaide Adrenaline | |
| 20 March 2012 | (United States) Kirk Golden | Toulouse-Blagnac | Sydney Ice Dogs | |
| 20 March 2012 | (United States) Casey Mignone | Pensacola Ice Flyers | Sydney Ice Dogs | |
| 27 March 2012 | (Australia) Andrew Crowther | Bobcaygeon Bucks | Melbourne Ice | |
| 27 March 2012 | (Australia) Mitchell Humphries | Banff Academy Bears | Melbourne Ice | |
| 27 March 2012 | (Australia) Todd Graham | Connecticut Jr. Wolfpack | Melbourne Ice | |
| 27 March 2012 | (Australia) Marcus Wong | EVU U20 | Melbourne Ice | |
| 30 March 2012 | (United States) Doug Wilson | No team | Melbourne Ice | |
| 30 March 2012 | (Netherlands) Matt Korthuis | HYS The Hague | Melbourne Ice | |
| 4 April 2012 | (Canada) Jeremy Boyer | Quad City Mallards | Newcastle North Stars | |
| 8 April 2012 | (Australia) Beau Taylor | Swan Valley Stampeders | Newcastle North Stars | |
| 17 April 2012 | (Canada) Robbie Lawrance | HYC Herentals | Newcastle North Stars | |
| 23 April 2012 | (Australia) Shannon McGregor | Bobcaygeon Bucks | Sydney Ice Dogs | |
| 23 April 2012 | (Australia) Gabriel Robledo | Sydney Bears | Sydney Ice Dogs | |
| 24 April 2012 | (United States) John Kennedy | Dayton Gems | Canberra Knights | |
| 24 April 2012 | (United States) Nic Polaski | Dayton Gems | Canberra Knights | |
| 24 April 2012 | (Canada) Lucas Schott | Brooklyn Aviators | Canberra Knights | |
| 29 April 2012 | (Switzerland) Andreas Camenzind | Rapperswil-Jona Lakers | Gold Coast Blue Tongues | |
| 30 April 2012 | (New Zealand) George Huber | Botany Swarm | Adelaide Adrenaline | |
| 29 June 2012 | (Belgium) Mitch Morgan | HYC Herentals | Adelaide Adrenaline | |
| 8 July 2012 | (Australia) Carter Lawrence | Notre Dame Argos HR Midget Tier2 | Gold Coast Blue Tongues | |
| 2012 | (Australia) Michael Smart | Toronto Canada Moose | Sydney Bears | |
| 2012 | (Canada) Kiefer Smiley | Mississippi Surge | Perth Thunder | |
| 2012 | (Australia) Anthony Nottle | EHC/2 U20 | Perth Thunder | |
| 2012 | (Canada) Aaron Wilson | Friesland Flyers | Perth Thunder | |
| 2012 | (New Zealand) Andrew Cox | Karhu-Kissat | Perth Thunder | |
| 2012 | (United States) Phil Ginand | Kalamazoo Wings | Perth Thunder | |
| 2012 | (Australia) Jordan Kyros | EHC/2 U20 | Perth Thunder | |
| 2012 | (Australia) Bradley Young | Gold Coast Blue Tongues | Perth Thunder | |
| 2012 | (Australia) Andrey Zolotarev | Viikingit | Adelaide Adrenaline | |
| 2012 | (United States) Mike Brown | Fayetteville FireAntz | Canberra Knights | |
| 2012 | (Australia) Harrison Byers | Ochapowace Thunder | Canberra Knights | |
| 2012 | (Australia) Tom Letki | Gold Coast Blue Tongues | Canberra Knights | |
| 2012 | (Australia) Kai Miettinen | UJK | Canberra Knights | |
| 2012 | (Australia) Anthony Kimlin | Whitby Dunlops | Gold Coast Blue Tongues | |
| 2012 | (United States) Adam Blanchette | Danbury Whalers | Gold Coast Blue Tongues | |
| 2012 | (Australia) Casey Minson | ESC Darmstadt | Gold Coast Blue Tongues | |
| 2012 | (United States) Tom Pesce | Middlebury College | Gold Coast Blue Tongues | |
| 2012 | (Canada) James Sanford | Melbourne Mustangs | Gold Coast Blue Tongues | |
| 2012 | (Australia) Christopher Wong | EPS U17 | Melbourne Ice | |
| 2012 | (United States) Dean Moore | Kramfors-Alliansen | Melbourne Mustangs | |
| 2012 | (United States) John Sullivan | Columbus Cottonmouths | Melbourne Mustangs | |
| 2012 | (Canada) Kevin Day | Solna SK | Newcastle North Stars | |
| 2012 | (Australia) David Upton | Gold Coast Blue Tongues | Newcastle North Stars | |
| 2012 | (Australia) Chris Slauenwhite | Adelaide Adrenaline | Sydney Bears | |
| 2012 | (Australia) Slavomir Boris | Canberra Knights | Sydney Bears | |
| 2012 | (Australia) Daniel Spina | Toronto Canada Moose | Sydney Ice Dogs | |
| 2012 | (Canada) Oliver Wren | SUNY Brockport | Melbourne Mustangs | |
| 2012 | (Australia) Carter Lawrence | Notre Dame Argos HR Midget Tier2 | Gold Coast Blue Tongues | |
| 2012 | (Canada) Etienne Du Toit | No team | Gold Coast Blue Tongues | |

== Regular season ==
The regular season will start on 28 April 2012 and will run through to 26 August 2012 before the teams compete in the playoff series. The Gold Coast Blue Tongues' final seven home games were relocated from Bundall, Gold Coast to Acacia Ridge, Brisbane after the cancelled match on 3 June. All relocated matches were scheduled to commence at 10:30pm, and the dates of some of the matches were adjusted to accommodate the away teams' travel plans.

The Newcastle North Stars won the H Newman Reid Trophy after finishing the regular season with the most points, 52. On 29 August the AIHL released the list of finalists for the 2012 awards. Matt Armstrong of the Melbourne Ice, Jeremy Boyer of the Newcastle North Stars, Perth Thunder's Kenny Rolph and Sydney Bears' Tomas Landa were nominated for the Most Valuable Player award, with Boyer and Landa both winning the award. Aaron Barton of Adelaide Adrenaline, Anthony Kimlin of the Gold Coast Blue Tongues and Perth Thunder's Kiefer Smiley were nominated for the Top Goaltender award with Anthony Kimlin being named the winner. Adam Blanchette of the Blue Tongues, Scott Levitt of the Melbourne Mustangs and Newcastle's Rob Lawrance were nominated for the Top Defenceman award with Rob Lawrance being announced as the winner. George Huber of the Adrenaline, Greg Bay of the Blue Tongues, the Mustangs' Brendan McDowell and Perth's David Kudla were all nominated for the Rookie of the Year award with George Huber and Greg Bay tying for the win.

=== April ===
| Game | Date | Time | Away | Score | Home | Location | Attendance | Recap |
|---|---|---|---|---|---|---|---|---|
| 1 | 28 April | 16:30 | Canberra Knights | 3 – 2 (SO) | Adelaide Adrenaline | Adelaide | 400 | |
| 2 | 28 April | 17:00 | Melbourne Mustangs | 5 – 6 (SO) | Melbourne Ice | Melbourne | 1700 | |
| 3 | 28 April | 18:00 | Sydney Ice Dogs | 2–5 | Sydney Bears | Baulkham Hills | | |
| 4 | 28 April | 17:00 | Gold Coast Blue Tongues | 3–4 | Newcastle North Stars | Newcastle | 1000 | |
| 5 | 29 April | 15:30 | Canberra Knights | 2–5 | Melbourne Ice | Melbourne | | |
| 6 | 29 April | 17:00 | Gold Coast Blue Tongues | 7–2 | Sydney Bears | Baulkham Hills | | |
| 7 | 29 April | 17:00 | Newcastle North Stars | 4–6 | Sydney Ice Dogs | Liverpool | | |

=== May ===
| Game | Date | Time | Away | Score | Home | Location | Attendance | Recap |
|---|---|---|---|---|---|---|---|---|
| 8 | 5 May | 16:30 | Canberra Knights | 4 – 3 (SO) | Perth Thunder | Perth | | |
| 9 | 5 May | 16:30 | Melbourne Ice | 5–6 | Adelaide Adrenaline | Adelaide | | |
| 10 | 5 May | 16:00 | Newcastle North Stars | 2–3 | Gold Coast Blue Tongues | Gold Coast | | |
| 11 | 5 May | 17:00 | Sydney Bears | 2–5 | Sydney Ice Dogs | Liverpool | | |
| 12 | 6 May | 16:30 | Melbourne Ice | 3 – 2 (SO) | Adelaide Adrenaline | Adelaide | | |
| 13 | 6 May | 15:30 | Canberra Knights | 4 – 3 (SO) | Melbourne Mustangs | Melbourne | | |
| 14 | 6 May | 17:00 | Sydney Ice Dogs | 7–6 | Newcastle North Stars | Newcastle | 800 | |
| 15 | 12 May | 16:00 | Adelaide Adrenaline | 2–1 | Gold Coast Blue Tongues | Gold Coast | 200 | |
| 16 | 12 May | 17:00 | Perth Thunder | 2–4 | Melbourne Ice | Melbourne | | |
| 17 | 12 May | 17:00 | Newcastle North Stars | 8–5 | Sydney Bears | Newcastle | | |
| 18 | 12 May | 17:30 | Sydney Ice Dogs | 4–1 | Canberra Knights | Canberra | 750 | |
| 19 | 13 May | 16:00 | Adelaide Adrenaline | 8–4 | Gold Coast Blue Tongues | Gold Coast | 200 | |
| 20 | 13 May | 15:30 | Perth Thunder | 5–2 | Melbourne Mustangs | Melbourne | | |
| 21 | 13 May | 17:00 | Canberra Knights | 1–6 | Newcastle North Stars | Newcastle | | |
| 22 | 17 May | 19:15 | Melbourne Ice | 5–1 | Melbourne Mustangs | Melbourne | | |
| 23 | 19 May | 16:30 | Perth Thunder | 2–5 | Adelaide Adrenaline | Adelaide | 470 | |
| 24 | 19 May | 17:00 | Gold Coast Blue Tongues | 4 – 5 (SO) | Melbourne Mustangs | Melbourne | 260 | |
| 25 | 19 May | 17:00 | Newcastle North Stars | 6–3 | Sydney Ice Dogs | Liverpool | 250 | |
| 26 | 19 May | 17:30 | Sydney Bears | 4–1 | Canberra Knights | Canberra | 1000 | |
| 27 | 20 May | 16:30 | Perth Thunder | 2–6 | Adelaide Adrenaline | Adelaide | | |
| 28 | 20 May | 15:30 | Gold Coast Blue Tongues | 4–0 | Melbourne Ice | Melbourne | 1000 | |
| 29 | 20 May | 17:00 | Sydney Bears | 4–7 | Newcastle North Stars | Newcastle | | |
| 30 | 26 May | 16:30 | Melbourne Mustangs | 3–2 | Perth Thunder | Perth | | |
| 31 | 26 May | 17:00 | Adelaide Adrenaline | 4–7 | Melbourne Ice | Melbourne | 1000 | |
| 32 | 26 May | 17:30 | Newcastle North Stars | 9–5 | Canberra Knights | Canberra | | |
| 33 | 27 May | 16:30 | Melbourne Mustangs | 4–2 | Perth Thunder | Perth | | |
| 34 | 27 May | 15:30 | Adelaide Adrenaline | 2–5 | Melbourne Ice | Melbourne | 970 | |
| 35 | 27 May | 17:00 | Canberra Knights | 2–7 | Sydney Bears | Baulkham Hills | 175 | |

=== June ===
| Game | Date | Time | Away | Score | Home | Location | Attendance | Recap |
|---|---|---|---|---|---|---|---|---|
| 36 | 2 June | 16:00 | Melbourne Ice | 5–2 | Gold Coast Blue Tongues | Gold Coast | 250 | |
| 37 | 2 June | 16:30 | Sydney Ice Dogs | 4–7 | Adelaide Adrenaline | Adelaide | 450 | |
| 38 | 2 June | 17:30 | Sydney Bears | 3–4 | Canberra Knights | Canberra | | |
| 39 | 3 June | 16:00 | Melbourne Ice | Cancelled | Gold Coast Blue Tongues | Gold Coast | | |
| 40 | 3 June | 15:30 | Sydney Ice Dogs | 5–1 | Melbourne Mustangs | Melbourne | 950 | |
| 41 | 16 June | 16:30 | Adelaide Adrenaline | 2–3 | Perth Thunder | Perth | | |
| 42 | 16 June | 17:00 | Gold Coast Blue Tongues | 6–1 | Melbourne Mustangs | Melbourne | 1000 | |
| 43 | 16 June | 17:30 | Sydney Ice Dogs | 5 – 4 (SO) | Canberra Knights | Canberra | 1000 | |
| 44 | 17 June | 16:30 | Adelaide Adrenaline | 2–5 | Perth Thunder | Perth | | |
| 45 | 17 June | 15:30 | Gold Coast Blue Tongues | 0–6 | Melbourne Ice | Melbourne | 1100 | |
| 46 | 17 June | 17:00 | Newcastle North Stars | 3–1 | Sydney Bears | Newcastle | | |
| 47 | 22 June | 22:30 | Perth Thunder | 6–3 | Gold Coast Blue Tongues | Acacia Ridge | 100 | |
| 48 | 23 June | 17:00 | Melbourne Mustangs | 2–7 | Newcastle North Stars | Newcastle | | |
| 49 | 23 June | 18:00 | Sydney Ice Dogs | 6–4 | Sydney Bears | Baulkham Hills | | |
| 50 | 23 June | 17:30 | Melbourne Ice | 8–3 | Canberra Knights | Canberra | | |
| 51 | 23 June | 22:30 | Perth Thunder | 6–3 | Gold Coast Blue Tongues | Acacia Ridge | | |
| 52 | 24 June | 17:00 | Melbourne Mustangs | 0–2 | Sydney Ice Dogs | Liverpool | 200 | |
| 53 | 24 June | 17:00 | Melbourne Ice | 6–2 | Sydney Bears | Baulkham Hills | | |
| 54 | 30 June | 22:30 | Sydney Bears | 6 – 5 (SO) | Gold Coast Blue Tongues | Acacia Ridge | 130 | |
| 55 | 30 June | 16:30 | Melbourne Mustangs | 0–10 | Adelaide Adrenaline | Adelaide | 650 | |
| 56 | 30 June | 16:30 | Sydney Ice Dogs | 3–2 | Perth Thunder | Perth | 700 | |
| 57 | 30 June | 17:00 | Canberra Knights | 2–6 | Newcastle North Stars | Newcastle | | |

=== July ===
| Game | Date | Time | Away | Score | Home | Location | Attendance | Recap |
|---|---|---|---|---|---|---|---|---|
| 58 | 1 July | 16:30 | Melbourne Mustangs | 3–1 | Adelaide Adrenaline | Adelaide | 650 | |
| 59 | 1 July | 15:30 | Sydney Ice Dogs | 1–9 | Melbourne Ice | Melbourne | 1200 | |
| 60 | 1 July | 17:00 | Newcastle North Stars | 4–3 | Sydney Bears | Baulkham Hills | | |
| 61 | 14 July | 22:30 | Canberra Knights | 1–5 | Gold Coast Blue Tongues | Acacia Ridge | 160 | |
| 62 | 14 July | 16:30 | Sydney Bears | 6–4 | Perth Thunder | Perth | | |
| 63 | 14 July | 17:00 | Melbourne Ice | 1–5 | Newcastle North Stars | Newcastle | 800 | |
| 64 | 15 July | 15:30 | Sydney Bears | 2–1 | Melbourne Mustangs | Melbourne | | |
| 65 | 15 July | 17:00 | Melbourne Ice | 4–3 | Sydney Ice Dogs | Liverpool | 300 | |
| 66 | 21 July | 16:30 | Newcastle North Stars | 2–0 | Perth Thunder | Perth | | |
| 67 | 21 July | 17:00 | Melbourne Mustangs | 1–4 | Melbourne Ice | Melbourne | 1450 | |
| 68 | 21 July | 17:00 | Sydney Bears | 4–6 | Sydney Ice Dogs | Liverpool | 300 | |
| 69 | 21 July | 17:30 | Adelaide Adrenaline | 6–2 | Canberra Knights | Canberra | | |
| 70 | 22 July | 15:30 | Newcastle North Stars | 3–5 | Melbourne Mustangs | Melbourne | 750 | |
| 71 | 22 July | 17:00 | Adelaide Adrenaline | 4–1 | Sydney Ice Dogs | Liverpool | 250 | |
| 72 | 22 July | 17:00 | Canberra Knights | 2–4 | Sydney Bears | Baulkham Hills | | |
| 73 | 28 July | 17:00 | Perth Thunder | 7–2 | Melbourne Mustangs | Melbourne | 390 | |
| 74 | 28 July | 17:00 | Adelaide Adrenaline | 2–5 | Newcastle North Stars | Newcastle | | |
| 75 | 28 July | 17:00 | Sydney Bears | 5 – 4 (SO) | Sydney Ice Dogs | Liverpool | | |
| 76 | 28 July | 17:30 | Gold Coast Blue Tongues | 1–4 | Canberra Knights | Canberra | | |
| 77 | 29 July | 15:30 | Perth Thunder | 6–3 | Melbourne Ice | Melbourne | 1000 | |
| 78 | 29 July | 17:00 | Canberra Knights | 1–9 | Newcastle North Stars | Newcastle | | |
| 79 | 29 July | 17:00 | Gold Coast Blue Tongues | 4–0 | Sydney Ice Dogs | Liverpool | 250 | |
| 80 | 29 July | 17:00 | Adelaide Adrenaline | 2–5 | Sydney Bears | Baulkham Hills | | |

=== August ===
| Game | Date | Time | Away | Score | Home | Location | Attendance | Recap |
|---|---|---|---|---|---|---|---|---|
| 81 | 3 August | 22:30 | Melbourne Mustangs | 3–5 | Gold Coast Blue Tongues | Acacia Ridge | 110 | |
| 82 | 4 August | 17:00 | Sydney Ice Dogs | 3 – 4 (SO) | Newcastle North Stars | Newcastle | | |
| 83 | 4 August | 17:30 | Perth Thunder | 1 – 2 (SO) | Canberra Knights | Canberra | | |
| 84 | 4 August | 22:30 | Melbourne Mustangs | 3–1 | Gold Coast Blue Tongues | Acacia Ridge | 120 | |
| 85 | 5 August | 17:00 | Perth Thunder | 4–3 | Sydney Bears | Baulkham Hills | | |
| 86 | 5 August | 17:00 | Canberra Knights | 5–3 | Sydney Ice Dogs | Liverpool | | |
| 87 | 9 August | 19:15 | Melbourne Ice | 6–1 | Melbourne Mustangs | Melbourne | 1150 | |
| 88 | 11 August | 16:30 | Gold Coast Blue Tongues | 3–2 | Perth Thunder | Perth | | |
| 89 | 11 August | 16:30 | Sydney Bears | 1–5 | Adelaide Adrenaline | Adelaide | 470 | |
| 90 | 11 August | 17:00 | Newcastle North Stars | 5–3 | Melbourne Ice | Melbourne | 1150 | |
| 91 | 11 August | 17:30 | Sydney Ice Dogs | 3–2 | Canberra Knights | Canberra | | |
| 92 | 12 August | 16:30 | Gold Coast Blue Tongues | 0–4 | Perth Thunder | Perth | | |
| 93 | 12 August | 16:30 | Newcastle North Stars | 2–4 | Adelaide Adrenaline | Adelaide | 440 | |
| 94 | 12 August | 15:30 | Sydney Bears | 3 – 4 (SO) | Melbourne Ice | Melbourne | 900 | |
| 95 | 18 August | 22:30 | Sydney Ice Dogs | 4–5 | Gold Coast Blue Tongues | Acacia Ridge | 120 | |
| 96 | 18 August | 16:30 | Melbourne Ice | 1–3 | Perth Thunder | Perth | | |
| 97 | 18 August | 17:00 | Adelaide Adrenaline | 1–0 | Melbourne Mustangs | Melbourne | 420 | |
| 98 | 18 August | 17:30 | Newcastle North Stars | 7 – 6 (SO) | Canberra Knights | Canberra | | |
| 99 | 19 August | 16:30 | Melbourne Ice | 4–2 | Perth Thunder | Perth | | |
| 100 | 19 August | 15:30 | Adelaide Adrenaline | 6–4 | Melbourne Mustangs | Melbourne | 385 | |
| 101 | 19 August | 17:00 | Sydney Bears | 4–0 | Newcastle North Stars | Newcastle | | |
| 102 | 19 August | 17:00 | Canberra Knights | 7–9 | Sydney Ice Dogs | Liverpool | 250 | |
| 39 | 23 August | 19:00 | Melbourne Ice | 5–3 | Gold Coast Blue Tongues | Melbourne | 450 | |
| 103 | 25 August | 16:30 | Gold Coast Blue Tongues | 5–1 | Adelaide Adrenaline | Adelaide | 410 | |
| 104 | 25 August | 17:00 | Perth Thunder | 4–6 | Newcastle North Stars | Newcastle | 600 | |
| 105 | 25 August | 17:30 | Melbourne Mustangs | 3–5 | Canberra Knights | Canberra | | |
| 106 | 26 August | 16:30 | Gold Coast Blue Tongues | 4 – 5 (SO) | Adelaide Adrenaline | Adelaide | 450 | |
| 107 | 26 August | 17:00 | Perth Thunder | 4–7 | Sydney Ice Dogs | Liverpool | 350 | |
| 108 | 26 August | 17:00 | Melbourne Mustangs | 1–7 | Sydney Bears | Baulkham Hills | | |

=== Standings ===
==== Bauer Conference ====
| Team | GP | W | OTW | OTL | L | GF | GA | GDF | PTS |
|---|---|---|---|---|---|---|---|---|---|
| Newcastle North Stars | 24 | 16 | 2 | 0 | 6 | 120 | 78 | +42 | 52 |
| Sydney Ice Dogs | 24 | 12 | 1 | 2 | 9 | 96 | 99 | −3 | 40 |
| Sydney Bears | 24 | 9 | 2 | 1 | 12 | 92 | 93 | −1 | 32 |
| Canberra Knights | 24 | 4 | 4 | 2 | 14 | 73 | 116 | −43 | 22 |

==== Easton Conference ====
| Team | GP | W | OTW | OTL | L | GF | GA | GDF | PTS |
|---|---|---|---|---|---|---|---|---|---|
| Melbourne Ice | 24 | 15 | 3 | 0 | 6 | 109 | 68 | +41 | 51 |
| Adelaide Adrenaline | 24 | 13 | 1 | 2 | 8 | 96 | 76 | +20 | 43 |
| Gold Coast Blue Tongues | 24 | 10 | 0 | 3 | 11 | 81 | 85 | −4 | 33 |
| Perth Thunder | 24 | 10 | 0 | 2 | 12 | 81 | 80 | +1 | 32 |
| Melbourne Mustangs | 24 | 5 | 1 | 2 | 16 | 54 | 107 | −53 | 19 |

| Qualified for the Goodall Cup playoffs | H Newman Reid Trophy winners |

=== Statistics ===
==== Scoring leaders ====
List shows the ten top skaters sorted by points, then goals.

| Player | Team | GP | G | A | Pts | PIM | POS |
|---|---|---|---|---|---|---|---|
| Jeremy Boyer | Newcastle North Stars | 24 | 25 | 33 | 58 | 22 | F |
| Tomas Landa | Sydney Bears | 24 | 19 | 39 | 58 | 6 | F |
| Matt Armstrong | Melbourne Ice | 24 | 23 | 28 | 51 | 46 | F |
| Phil Ginand | Perth Thunder | 23 | 26 | 24 | 50 | 100 | F |
| Mike McRae | Gold Coast Blue Tongues | 22 | 21 | 29 | 50 | 66 | F |
| Ken Rolph | Perth Thunder | 24 | 21 | 26 | 47 | 26 | F |
| Greg Oddy | Adelaide Adrenaline | 22 | 27 | 19 | 46 | 26 | F |
| Casey Mignone | Sydney Ice Dogs | 24 | 24 | 22 | 46 | 66 | F |
| Beau Taylor | Newcastle North Stars | 24 | 25 | 20 | 45 | 10 | F |
| Brian Bales | Newcastle North Stars | 21 | 21 | 24 | 45 | 14 | F |

==== Leading goaltenders ====
Only the top five goaltenders, based on save percentage with a minimum of ten games played.

| Player | Team | MIP | SOG | GA | GAA | SVS% | SO |
|---|---|---|---|---|---|---|---|
| Anthony Kimlin | Gold Coast Blue Tongues | 519 | 399 | 26 | 2.25 | 0.935 | 1 |
| Mike Brown | Canberra Knights | 718 | 636 | 58 | 3.64 | 0.909 | 0 |
| Aaron Barton | Adelaide Adrenaline | 871 | 582 | 55 | 2.84 | 0.905 | 2 |
| Kiefer Smiley | Perth Thunder | 1026 | 655 | 70 | 3.07 | 0.893 | 1 |
| Olivier Martin | Newcastle North Stars | 944 | 589 | 64 | 3.05 | 0.891 | 1 |

=== Season awards ===
Below lists the 2012 AIHL regular season award winners.

| Award | Name | Team |
|---|---|---|
| MVP | (Czech Republic) Tomas Landa (Canada) Jeremy Boyer | Sydney Bears; Newcastle North Stars |
| Goaltender | (Australia) Anthony Kimlin | Gold Coast Blue Tongues |
| Defenceman | (Canada) Robbie Lawrance | Newcastle North Stars |
| Rookie | (Australia) Greg Bay (New Zealand) Charlie Huber | Gold Coast Blue Tongues; Adelaide Adrenaline |

== Goodall Cup playoffs ==
The 2012 playoffs started on 1 September 2012, with the Goodall Cup final being held on 2 September. Following the end of the regular season the top two teams from each conference advanced to the playoff series with the winner of each conference playing in the semi-final round against the runner-up of the other conference. All three games were held at the Hunter Ice Skating Stadium in Warners Bay, New South Wales, the home of the Newcastle North Stars. The series was a single game elimination with the two winning semi-finalists advancing to the Goodall Cup final. The Melbourne Ice completed the three-peat and won the Goodall Cup for the third year in a row after defeating the Newcastle North Stars in the final. Todd Graham of the Melbourne Ice was named the finals MVP.

Semifinals
1 | Adelaide Adrenaline | 4
4 | Newcastle North Stars | 5
3 | Sydney Ice Dogs | 2
2 | Melbourne Ice | 6

Final
Newcastle North Stars | 3
Melbourne Ice | 4

All times are UTC+10:00

=== Semi-finals ===
| 1 September 2012; 15:30 | Adelaide Adrenaline | 4–5 (1–2, 2–1, 1–2) | Newcastle North Stars | Hunter Ice Skating Stadium |

Game reference

Aaron Barton
Goalies
Olivier Martin
Referee:
Jeff Scott
Linesmen:
Cory Ross
Matthew Taylor

| | 0 – 1 | 1:35 – Boyer (Bales, Day) |
| 2:35 – Greer (Oddy, Darge) | 1 – 1 |
| | 1 – 2 | 10:21 – Stranger (Starke) |
| | 1 – 3 | 21:13 – Boyer (Bales, Taylor) |
| 23:44 – Werner | 2 – 3 |
| 29:27 – Oddy (Greer, Liscomb) | 3 – 3 |
| | 3 – 4 | 31:00 – Bales (Upton, Quirk-Orford) |
| 32:21 – Darge | 4 – 4 |
| | 4 – 5 | 33:47 – Taylor (Bales, Day) |

8 min
Penalties
13 min
27
Shots
22

| 1 September 2012; 19:00 | Sydney Ice Dogs | 2–6 (0–3, 1–2, 1–1) | Melbourne Ice | Hunter Ice Skating Stadium |

Game reference

Gabriel Robledo
Goalies
Stuart Denman
Referee:
Rick West
Linesmen:
Darren Lampard
Greg Madsen

| | 0 – 1 | 0:14 – Armstrong (J. Hughes, Baclig) |
| | 0 – 2 | 2:56 – J. Hughes (Armstrong, Baclig) |
| | 0 – 3 | 4:06 – Baclig (Wilson, Powell) |
| | 0 – 4 | 16:20 – Powell (Webster) (PP) |
| 18:50 – White | 1 – 4 |
| | 1 – 5 | 25:40 – Korthuis (J. Hughes) |
| 38:13 – Tesarik (Monaghan) | 2 – 5 |
| | 2 – 6 | 39:29 – Baclig (Armstrong, Graham) |

26 min
Penalties
10 min
27
Shots
27

=== Final ===
| 2 September 2012; 16:00 | Melbourne Ice | 4–3 (1–2, 2–0, 1–1) | Newcastle North Stars | Hunter Ice Skating Stadium; Attendance: 1000 |

Game reference

Stuart Denman
Goalies
Olivier Martin
Referee:
Jeff Scott
Linesmen:
Cory Ross
Matthew Taylor

| | 0 – 1 | 3:01 – Day (Lawrance) |
| | 0 – 2 | 12:59 – Quirk-Orford (Lawrance, Bales) |
| 13:16 – Armstrong | 1 – 2 |
| 20:00 – Webster | 2 – 2 |
| 29:09 – Baclig (Sturrock) | 3 – 2 |
| Webster (Korthuis) | 4 – 2 |
| | 4 – 3 | 39:16 – Day (Boyer) (PP) |

10 min
Penalties
4 min
25
Shots
32
