= H Newman Reid Trophy =

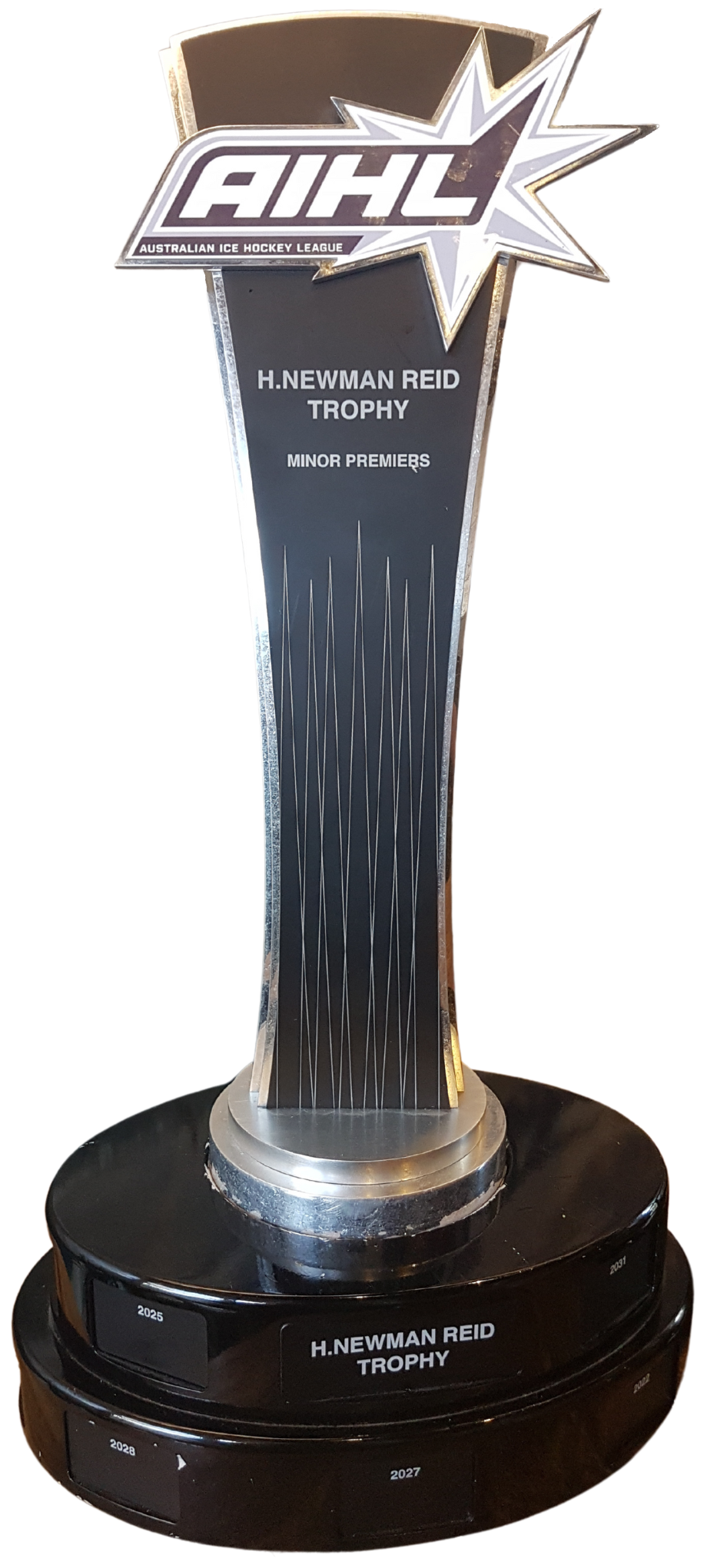
- Sport: Ice hockey
- Awarded for: Regular-season Premier of the Australian Ice Hockey League

History
- First award: 2008 – Sydney Bears (backdated)
- Most wins: Newcastle Northstars; Canberra Brave; Melbourne Ice (4 titles)
- Most recent: 2024 – Melbourne Ice (4th title)

Commissioned by the Australian Ice Hockey League (AIHL) in 2009, the H Newman Reid Trophy is an Australian men's ice hockey trophy awarded to the team that finishes top of the standings at the end of each AIHL regular-season, otherwise known as the Premiers. The trophy Superseded the defunct V.I.P. Cup.

== History ==
Original H Newman Reid Trophy, which was lost in 2014

2009, H Newman Reid Trophy was commissioned by the AIHL board in 2009 to replace the Goodall Cup for the league champion following the removal of the traditional century-old Goodall Cup by IHA. It was designed to be a new 'tradition' trophy and was originally named the AIHL Champions trophy for this purpose.

2009, Adelaide Adrenaline won the inaugural AIHL Champions Trophy by beating the Newcastle North Stars 3-2 (OT) in the AIHL final.

2010, the Goodall Cup returned to the AIHL and was once again installed as the league championship trophy. The AIHL Champions Trophy was subsequently renamed the H Newman Reid Trophy in honour of the Henry Newman Reid who opened the first ice rinks in Australia between 1904 and 1907 and whose family fostered the first ice sports including hockey in Australia. The trophy was reassigned to honour the regular season's top team in the standings (premiers) and replaced the defunct V.I.P. Cup, which had been last awarded in 2007. Adelaide's 2009 trophy win was backdated and changed to the Goodall Cup with the 2008 (Sydney Bears) and 2009 (Newcastle North Stars) premiers awarded the H Newman Reid trophy by the same measure.

2011, the Melbourne Ice became the first team to win the domestic double including the H Newman Reid Trophy by claiming the Reid Trophy for finishing top of the AIHL league standings and Goodall Cup by winning the championship final 3–2 over Newcastle North Stars.

From 2014 to 2019, the trophy was presented in name only, as the physical trophy had been missing, presumed destroyed. A new trophy was presented to the 2022 winners CBR Brave.

== Year on year premiers ==
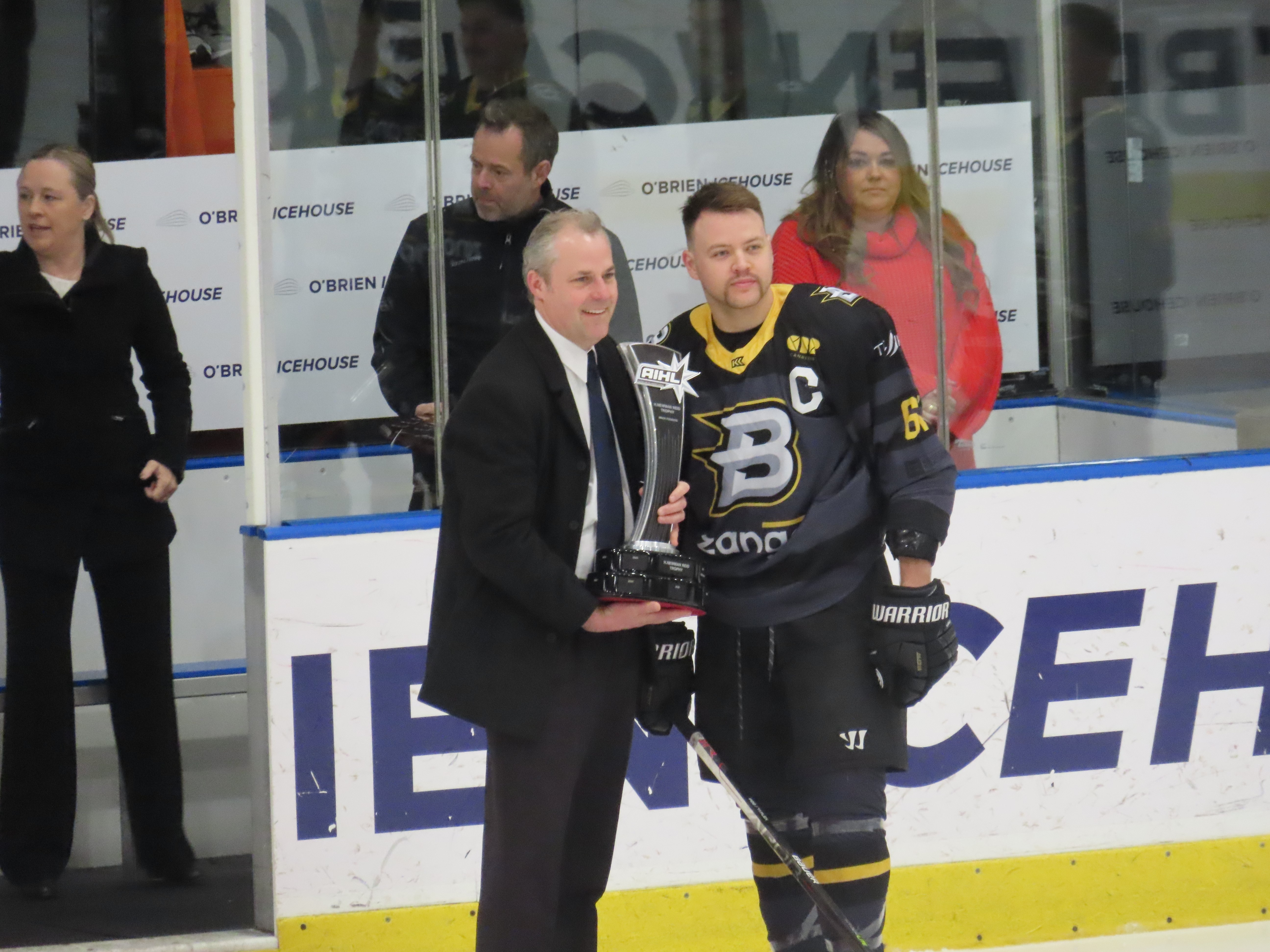
The H Newman Reid Trophy being presented to 2022 winners CBR Brave

Trophy legend
No trophy	V.I.P. Cup	H Newman Reid Trophy

Trophy	No.	Season	Premiers
	1	2000	Sydney Bears
	2	2001	Adelaide Avalanche
	3	2002	Sydney Bears
	4	2003	Adelaide Avalanche
	5	2004	Newcastle North Stars
	6	2005	Adelaide Avalanche
	7	2006	Melbourne Ice
	8	2007	Adelaide Avalanche
	9	2008	AIHL Bears
	10	2009	Newcastle North Stars

Trophy	No.	Season	Premiers
	11	2010	Newcastle North Stars
	12	2011	Melbourne Ice
	13	2012	Newcastle North Stars
	14	2013	Sydney Ice Dogs
	15	2014	Melbourne Mustangs
	16	2015	Newcastle North Stars
	17	2016	Melbourne Ice
	18	2017	Melbourne Ice
	19	2018	CBR Brave
	20	2019	CBR Brave

Trophy	No.	Season	Premiers
	21	2022	CBR Brave
	22	2023	CBR Brave
	23	2024	Sydney Bears
	24	2025	Melbourne Ice

=== Premierships by club ===
Total number of premierships won by teams in the AIHL throughout the league's entire history.

Team	Premierships	Winning years
Newcastle Northstars	5	2004, 2009, 2010, 2012, 2015
Melbourne Ice	5	2006, 2011, 2016, 2017, 2025
Adelaide Avalanche	4	2001, 2003, 2005, 2007
Canberra Brave	4	2018, 2019, 2022, 2023
Sydney Bears	4	2000, 2002, 2008, 2024
Sydney Ice Dogs	1	2013
Melbourne Mustangs	1	2014

=== H Newman Reid Trophies by club ===
Total number of premierships won by teams in the AIHL from the 2008 season onwards.

Team	HNR trophies	Trophy winning years
Newcastle Northstars	4	2009, 2010, 2012, 2015
Canberra Brave	4	2018, 2019, 2022, 2023
Melbourne Ice	4	2011, 2016, 2017, 2025
Sydney Bears	2	2008, 2024
Sydney Ice Dogs	1	2013
Melbourne Mustangs	1	2014

== See also ==
- Presidents' Trophy, the National Hockey League equivalent
- V.I.P. Cup, the previous equivalent trophy given in the AIHL
