= Hunter Ice Skating Stadium =

Ice arena in New South Wales, Australia

- Interactive map of Hunter Ice Skating Stadium
- Location: 230 Macquarie Rd, Warners Bay, New South Wales
- Coordinates: 32.96256°S 151.6567°E
- Capacity: 1,000 (seating and standing)
- Surface: 60 m × 30 m (197 ft × 98 ft)

Construction
- Opened: 2000 (26 years ago)

Tenants
- Hunter Ice Skating Club (2001–present); Newcastle Northstars (2002–present)

Website
- www.hiss.com.au

The Hunter Ice Skating Stadium is an ice sports and public skate centre, opened in 2000 and located in Warners Bay, a suburb of Lake Macquarie, New South Wales, Australia. The stadium serves as the home ice rink of the Newcastle Northstars who compete in the Australian Ice Hockey League and East Coast Super League.

== Facilities ==
Facilities at Hunter Ice Skating Stadium are detailed below:

- 60 m × 30 m (197 ft × 98 ft) ice rink (Olympic sized with plexi-glass)
- Jumbotron (Australia's first and only jumbotron at an ice rink venue)
- Capacity for 1,000 spectators (both bench and individual seating)
- Skate hire
- Canteen
- Proshop
- Onsite parking

== Events ==
In 2001 the Hunter Ice Skating Club was established with figure skating and synchronised ice skating events held at Hunter Ice Skating Stadium (HISS) year round.

Since 2002, the Hunter Ice Skating Stadium has annually hosted fourteen regular season Australian Ice Hockey League (AIHL) matches between the months of April and August. In 2005 the Northstars also joined the East Coast Super League (ECSL), used as a development league for younger players, and Hunter Ice Skating Stadium started hosting ECSL matches between the months of March and September each year.

The Newcastle In House Hockey League (NIHL) is based at Hunter Ice Skating Stadium. There are different competitions in summer, autumn and winter. The league consists of four senior divisions and a junior league.

HISS has been the host venue for the AIHL finals weekend four times in 2005, 2008, 2009, 2012. The Northstars have made the Goodall Cup final in each season Newcastle has been the host venue, and as of 2012, holds a split record of two wins and two losses in the final at the venue.

Between 7 and 13 April 2008, Hunter Ice Skating Stadium was the host venue for the 2008 IIHF World Championship Division II Group B tournament. The stadium was known as the ‘Newcastle HISS Arena’ for the tournament. Six nations competed in group B with hosts Australia joined by China, Spain, Mexico, Iceland and New Zealand. Fifteen matches in total were played at HISS over the seven days. Australia topped the ladder at the end of the week and won promotion to Division I Group A for 2009. China finished runner-up with New Zealand coming in last and getting relegated to Division III.

In 2015, the AIHL commission resurrected the All-stars event to incorporate into the AIHL season. The Hunter Ice Skating Stadium was selected as the inaugural host venue for the re-instated event. The 2015 AIHL All-Stars ran for two days on 12 and 13 September 2015, with the skills competitions held on the Saturday and the all-stars match taking place on the Sunday. Team Schlamp defeated Team Bales in the All-stars match 7–3 with Patrick O'Kane named MVP.

The STOPCONCUSSIONS Foundation's annual Ice Hockey Classic USA vs Canada exhibition series announced HISS, on 17 March 2019, as a host venue for opening match of the five match 2019 edition. The Hunter Ice Skating Stadium will host the exhibition match on 12 June 2019 at 7pm. The series has been going since 2015 and has brought a number of current and past NHL players and coaches along with a host of AHL and ECHL players to Australia and New Zealand during that time. Players and coaches donate their time to raise money for the STOPCONCUSSIONS Foundation and awareness of the sport of ice hockey to Australia and New Zealand. The stadium will hold the 2026 Women's World Para Ice Hockey Championships.

== See also ==
- List of ice rinks in Australia
- Sport in New South Wales
