= Adelaide Avalanche =

- City: Thebarton, Adelaide, South Australia
- League: Australian Ice Hockey League
- Founded: 15 May 1999 (26 years ago)
- Operated: 2000–2008
- Dissolved: 17 June 2008 (17 years ago)
- Home arena: Snowdome Adelaide
- Colours: Blue, bronze, black and white
- General manager: (Australia) Alan Yarrow
- Head coach: (Australia) Corey Smith
- Captain: (Australia) Greg Oddy

Championships
- Premierships: 4 (2001, 2003, 2005, 2007)
- AIHL Championships: 2 (2000, 2001)

The Adelaide Avalanche was a semi-professional ice hockey club based in the Adelaide suburb of Thebarton, South Australia. The Avalanche, founded in 1999, was a founding member of the Australian Ice Hockey League (AIHL). The team's home venue was the Snowdome Adelaide (now known as IceArenA). The Avalanche competed in the AIHL for eight years, from its inaugural season in 2000 until 17 June 2008, when the club was replaced with the Snowdome's own team, Adelaide A's (later rebranded Adelaide Adrenaline), after its AIHL licence was revoked due to financial issues. During the club's lifetime, the Avalanche won four AIHL premierships and two AIHL championships.

== History ==
=== Foundation and ECSL (1999–00) ===
The Adelaide Avalanche was founded in May 1999 by the Oddy and Thilthorpe families to secure national ice hockey competition for South Australia and their sons. Steve Oddy and James Thilthorpe headed the fledgling club as owners and directors, Steve Oddy taking on the role of club chairman.

The Avalanche appointed John Botterill as inaugural head coach. He would be assisted by Neil Boyle. Australian international defenceman, Pavel Bohacik, was appointed the club's maiden captain.

Adelaide quickly joined the de facto national league, East Coast Super League (ECSL) in 1999, in what would prove to be the NSW administered ECSL's last season. The Avalanche's first ever competitive game was on the road in Sydney against the Canterbury Eagles. Adelaide defeated the Eagles 7–5 to register the club's inaugural victory. Steve's son Greg Oddy led the South Australian outfit's opening performance, registering two goals. Oddy and Thilthorpe personally arranged and paid for the travel of east coast teams to Adelaide in 1999. On 15 May 1999, Adelaide hosted its first competitive home game at the Snowdome in Thebarton.

=== AIHL era (2000–08) ===
Along with the Sydney Bears and Canberra Knights, the Avalanche were one of the founding members of the AIHL in 2000. They finished first out of the three teams that year and claimed the inaugural AIHL championship. In 2001, the club enjoyed the same success in winning their second consecutive title.

In 2002, the Melbourne Ice, Western Sydney Ice Dogs, and Newcastle North Stars joined the AIHL, expanding it to six teams. The Goodall Cup, Australia's top prize in ice hockey, also became part of the AIHL that year. Adelaide again finished second in the overall standings and lost to the Bears in the Goodall Cup final.

Adelaide Avalanche's original logo used between 1999 and 1906.

The Avalanche finished the 2003 season with their fourth straight minor premiership but lost to the Ice Dogs in the first round of a newly introduced four-team playoff system. They would lose in the semifinals again in 2004 to the North Stars in double overtime.

As two more teams—the Brisbane Blue Tongues and Central Coast Rhinos—entered the league in 2005, the Avalanche returned to dominance by finishing first overall in the regular season standings. The "curse of the minor premiers" again haunted the team. Despite winning through to the Goodall Cup final for the first time in three years, they were defeated 3–1 by the North Stars in that game.

The Avalanche have retooled for 2006 in the quest for their first-ever Goodall Cup, with their current roster boasting Mighty Roos players Greg Oddy and brothers Ben & Luke Thilthorpe. They finished second after the regular season and hosted the finals series, beating the Ice Dogs 5–2 to reach the final but losing the final 0–4 to the North Stars.

Members of the Adelaide Avalanche were featured on episode 11 of Network Ten's Cyber Shack TV on 10 October 2006. Both David Huxley and Brad Wanchulak played and reviewed the new NHL 2K6 on Xbox 360.

The Avalanche came into financial difficulties in 2008, and after being able to host several game at the start of the season, could not meet its road commitments, forcing the team to withdraw from the remainder of the season on 17 June. The team's players were transferred to the newly formed Adelaide A's, who in a deal with the AIHL was allowed to play the remainder of the Avalanche's season.

In 2022 the name of the Adelaide Avalanche was revived by a new team competing in the Pacific Hockey League.

== Season-by-season record ==
Champions	Runners-up	Third Place

Adelaide Avalanche all-time record
Season	Regular season											Finals weekend								Top points scorer	
Season	P	W	T	L	SW	SL	GF	GA	GD	Pts	Finish	P	W	L	GF	GA	Result	Semi-final	AIHL final	Name	Points
2000	Information not available										2nd	1	1	0	6	5	Champions	–	Won 6–5 (SO) (Bears)	(Australia) John Oddy	34
2001	16	15	1	0	–	–	120	60	+60	31	1st	1	1	0	10	7	Champions	–	Won 10–7 (Bears)	(Canada) Paul Lawson	38
2002	20	13	0	7	–	–	120	67	+53	26	2nd	1	0	1	4	7	Runners-up	–	Lost 4–7 (Bears)	(Australia) Greg Oddy	39
2003 (Note: 2003 AIHL season statistics are incomplete. No one source has all the information and the AIHL has not published official statistics on www.theaihl.com.)	18	15	0	3	–	–	98	52	+46	30	1st (Note: Based on the most complete information available, the Avalanche finished the 2003 season in first place and qualified for the first four team finals weekend.)	2	0	2	5	14	Fourth (Note: 2003 was the one and only season where a third place play-off was contested as part of the finals format for the AIHL. The Sydney Bears defeated the Adelaide Avalanche 10–5 in the third place play-off so the Avalanche finished fourth.)	Lost 1–4 (Ice Dogs)	–	(Australia) Greg Oddy	47
2004	20	7	1	9	1	1	64	68	−4	29	4th	1	0	1	2	3	Semi-finalist	Lost 2–3 (2OT) (North Stars)	–	(Australia) Greg Oddy	30
2005	26	19	1	4	0	2	133	77	+56	60	1st	2	1	1	7	6	Runners-up	Won 6–3 (Bears)	Lost 1–3 (North Stars)	(Canada) Darcy Corcoran	47
2006	28	19	–	9	0	0	134	84	+50	57	2nd	2	1	1	5	6	Runners-up	Won 5–2 (Ice Dogs)	Lost 0–4 (North Stars)	(Canada) Brad Wanchulak	53
2007	28	17	–	7	1	3	124	99	+25	56	1st	1	0	1	1	4	Semi-finalist	Lost 1–4 (Bears)	–	(Australia) Greg Oddy	43
2008	15 (Note: Only completed 15 of the 28 matches in the 2008 season before withdrawing and forfeiting two games. All points, players and fixtured were transferred to the Adelaide A's when the licence was transferred.)	3	–	8	2	2	32	53	−21	15	DNF	–								(Sweden) Peter Lindgren	29 (Note: top point scorer over entire season including matches for both the Avalanche and Adelaide A's.)

Notes:

Notes References:

== Honours ==
=== Championships ===
- AIHL Championships (2000–01)^{1}

(gold) Champions (2): 2000, 2001
(silver) Runners-Up (0):

- Goodall Cup

(gold) Champions (0):
(silver) Runners-Up (3): 2002, 2005, 2006

- V.I.P. Cup (2004–07)^{2}

(gold) Premiers (4): 2001, 2003, 2005, 2007
(silver) Runners-Up (2): 2002, 2006

^{1} The first two season's of the AIHL did not have the Goodall Cup as the Championship prize. The Adelaide Avalanche is the only AIHL team to win the AIHL and not be crowned Goodall Cup Champions.
^{2} This list also includes Premierships won prior to the first trophy (VIP Cup) for Premiers came into existence in 2004.

=== Franchise Awards ===
Each season, between 1999 and 2007, the Avalanche held an annual awards night where the team awarded a number of player awards.

Season	MVP	BR	FC	BD	LS	BDF	CA
1999	(Australia) Glen Foll	(Australia) Eric Lien	(Australia) Trevor Walsh	(Australia) Pavel Bohacik	(Australia) John Oddy	–	–
2000	(Australia) Greg Oddy	(Canada) Shane Wouters	(Australia) Greg Oddy	(Australia) Pavel Bohacik	(Australia) John Oddy	–	–
2001	(Canada) Charlie Lawson	(Canada) Charlie Lawson	(Canada) Paul Lawson	(Australia) Glen Foll	(Canada) Paul Lawson	(Australia) Chris Brlecic	–
2002	(Australia) Eric Lien	(Canada) Jamie Lever	(Australia) Trevor Walsh	(Australia) Glen Foll	(Australia) Greg Oddy	(Australia) Chris Brlecic	–
2003	(Canada) Dylan Martini	(Australia) Josh Harding	(Australia) Trevor Walsh	(Canada) Dylan Martini	(Australia) Greg Oddy	(United States) Duane Gera	–
2004	(Australia) Trevor Walsh	(Australia) Cass Delsar	(Australia) Greg Oddy	(United States) Chris Chant	(Australia) Greg Oddy	(Australia) Luke Thilthorpe	–
2005	(Australia) Greg Oddy	(Australia) Olivier Martin	(Canada) Steve McKenna	(Canada) Steve McKenna	(Canada) Darcy Corcoran	(Canada) Tanner Shultz	–
2006	(Australia) Greg Oddy	(Australia) David Huxley	(Canada) Brad Wanchulak	(United States) Kevin Clauson	(Canada) Brad Wanchulak	(Australia) Chris Brlecic	(Canada) Nigel Ward
2007	(Australia) Olivier Martin	(Australia) Sean Greer	(Australia) David Huxley	(Australia) Josh Harding	(Australia) Greg Oddy	(Canada) Mike Van Den Bosch	(Australia) Ryan Remillard

== Players ==
=== Last roster ===
Team roster for the 2008 AIHL season

Adelaide Avalanche roster - 2008 AIHL season
Active roster		Coaching staff
Goaltenders: 87 (Sweden) Christopher Elf; 1 (Australia) Peter King; 35 (Australia) Eric Lien; 39 (Australia) Olivier Marton; Defencemen: 13 (Australia) Nathan Brown; -- (Australia) Scott Chandler; 2 (Australia) Nick Clark; 44 (Australia) Sean Greer (A); 22 (Australia) Joshua Harding (A); 23 (Australia) David Huxley; 33 (Sweden) Bob Sannemo; 8 (Canada) Brad Van Camp; 4 (Australia) Brandon Williams; 45 (Australia) Andrey Zolotarev	Forwards: -- (Canada) Blair Bourgeault; 40 (Australia) Darren Corstens; 7 (United States) Kevin Crowder; 11 (Australia) Cass Delsar; 76 (Australia) Luke Harding; 18 (Australia) James Keane; 9 (Canada) Chase Kinch (A); 27 (Sweden) Peter Lindgren; 19 (Australia) David Manning; 10 (Australia) Greg Oddy (C); -- (Australia) Dean Peterson; 42 (Australia) Tristan Reese; 3 (Australia) Ben Thilthorpe; 15 (Australia) Mitchell Villani; -- (Australia) Trevor Walsh; 16 (Australia) Matthew Wegener	Head Coach: (Canada) Steve McKenna; (Australia) Corey Smith (interim); Coaches: (Australia) Steve Wise; Legend (C) Captain (A) Alternate Captain (I) Import player Statistics; Average age: 22.1; Average height: 179.9 cm Average weight: 82.4 kg Win%: 33%
Last updated on: 28 May 2022
Elite ProspectsAdelaide Avalanche Legends of Australian Ice

=== NHL players ===
A list of players that have played at least one game for the Avalanche and who have also played at least one game in the National Hockey League (NHL).

Name	Year(s)	NHL team(s)
(Canada) Steve McKenna	2005	Los Angeles Kings; Minnesota Wild; Pittsburgh Penguins; New York Rangers
(Canada) Mel Angelstad	2007	Washington Capitals

=== International players ===
A list of players that have played at least one game for the Avalanche and who have also played at least one game for an international team at the World Championships organised by the IIHF.

Name	Caps	Points	PIM	Medals	Notes
(Australia) Glen Foll	80	72	32	1 (silver) 4 (bronze)	Australian captain for 15 tournaments (1990 to 2006)
(Australia) Greg Oddy	72	118	131	2 (gold) 3 (silver) 3 (bronze)	Australian captain for 4 tournaments (2010 to 2014)
(Australia) Ben Thilthorpe	32	20	51	1 (gold) 1 (silver) 3 (bronze)
(Australia) Joshua Harding	31	8	16	1 (gold) 1 (silver) 1 (bronze)	Australian alternate captain for 1 tournament (2014–15)
(Australia) David Huxley	28	10	8	2 (gold) 1 (silver)	Australian alternate captain for 1 tournament (2015–16)
(Australia) Luke Thilthorpe	24	17	10	1 (gold) 1 (silver) 2 (bronze)
(Australia) Pavel Bohacik	24	3	8
(Australia) Daniel George	20	2	6	1 (silver) 1 (bronze)
(Australia) Andrew Brunt	16	6	8
(Australia) Trevor Walsh	15	26	93	1 (silver) 2 (bronze)
(Australia) Chris Brlecic	14	10	20	2 (silver) 1 (bronze)
(Australia) John Oddy	14	28	36
(Australia) Mitchell Villani	10	5	8	1 (silver)
(Australia) Ross Howell	10	5	2	1 (bronze)
(Australia) Sean Greer	10	0	4
(Australia) James Keane	9	4	2	1 (silver) 1 (bronze)
(Australia) Cass Delsar	9	4	8	2 (silver)
(Australia) Matthew Wegener	5	0	4
(Australia) Ari Pullinen	5	0	2
(Australia) Dusan Ocenas	4	2	2
(Australia) Olivier Martin	1	0	0
(Australia) Paul Cracknell	1	0	0

=== Player records ===
Avalanche all-time, season and game player records.

All-time

No.	Appearances		Points		Penalty Minutes
#	Name	GP	Name	P	Name	PIM
1	(Australia) Greg Oddy	133	(Australia) Greg Oddy	280	(Australia) Trevor Walsh	505
2	(Australia) Ben Thilthorpe	126	(Australia) Trevor Walsh	201	(Australia) Greg Oddy	426
3	(Australia) Luke Thilthorpe	122	(Australia) Ben Thilthorpe	153	(Australia) John Oddy	350
4	(Australia) Chris Brlecic	119	(Australia) Chris Brlecic	115	(Australia) Ben Thilthorpe	346
5	(Australia) Trevor Walsh	100	(Australia) Luke Thilthorpe	113	(Australia) Chris Brlecic	341
6	(Australia) Eric Lien	84	(Australia) John Oddy	111	(Australia) Luke Thilthorpe	231
7	(Australia) Josh Harding	77	(Canada) Dylan Martini	86	(Canada) Tanner Shultz	154
8	(Australia) Glen Foll	68	(Australia) Glen Foll	73	(Australia) Cass Delsar	133
9	(Australia) Daniel George	68	(Canada) Brad Wanchulak	53	(United States) Ryan Clauson	107
10	(Australia) James Keane	65	(Canada) Darcy Corcoran	47	(Canada) Dylan Martini	104

Season

Category	Record	Season	Held by
Most Points	53	2006	(Canada) Brad Wanchulak
Most Goals	26	2006	(Canada) Brad Wanchulak
Most Assists	33	2006	(Australia) Greg Oddy
Most Points (Defenceman)	36	2003	(Canada) Dylan Martini
Most Penalty Minutes	154	2005	(Canada) Tanner Shultz
Best Goaltender Save %	91.8%	2005	(Australia) Olivier Martin
Best Goaltender G.A.A	2.24	2005	(Australia) Olivier Martin
Most Goaltender Wins	15	2006	(Canada) Nigel Ward
Most Goaltender Shutouts	1	1999 / 2006	(Australia) Eric Lien / (Canada) Nigel Ward
Most Game Winning Goals	6	2003 / 2006	(Australia) Greg Oddy / (Canada) Brad Wanchulak
Most Power Play Goals	7	2006	(Australia) Greg Oddy
Most Shorthanded Goals	4	2001	(Australia) Trevor Walsh
Most Hatricks	4	2002	(Australia) Greg Oddy
Most Consecutive GP with a point	17	2006	(Australia) Greg Oddy

Single game

Category	Record	Date	Held by	Opponent
Most Points	9	19 Aug 2006	(Australia) Greg Oddy	Canberra Knights
Most Goals	5	19 Aug 2006	(Canada) Brad Wanchulak	Canberra Knights
Most Assists	6	19 Aug 2006	(Australia) Greg Oddy	Canberra Knights
Most Penalty Minutes	52	22 Jul 2006	(United States) Ryan Clauson	Newcastle North Stars
Most Goaltender Saves	58	28 May 2000	(Australia) Eric Lien	Sydney Bears
Fastest Goal (Start of Game)	14 secs	7 Jan 2000	(Australia) Luke Thilthorpe	Penrith Phantoms
Fastest Two Goals	6 secs	7 Aug 2000	(Australia) Greg Oddy	Canberra Knights
Fastest Hatrick	5.01 mins	22 Jun 2003	(Australia) Trevor Walsh	Western Sydney Ice Dogs

== Leaders ==
=== Team captains ===
The Avalanche had three captains in the team's known history. The captain in 1999 and between 2002 and 2003 are currently unknown.

No.	Name	Term
1	(Australia) Pavel Bohacik	1999–01
2	(Australia) Chris Brlecic	2004–05
3	(Australia) Greg Oddy	2006–08

=== Head coaches ===
The Avalanche had four head coaches in the team's history.

No.	Name	Term
1	(Australia) John Botterill	1999–06
2	(Canada) Brandon Williams	2007
3	(Canada) Steve McKenna	2008
4	(Australia) Corey Smith	2008

=== General managers ===
The Avalanche had two general manager groups (GMs) in the team's history.

No.	Name	Term
1	(Australia) Steve Oddy (Australia) James Thilthorpe	1999–06
2	(Australia) Alan Yarrow	2007–08
