= 2004 AIHL season =

- League: Australian Ice Hockey League
- Sport: Ice hockey
- Duration: 1 May 2004 – 5 September 2004

Regular season
- V.I.P. Cup: Newcastle North Stars (1st title)
- Top scorer: Martin Jesko (41 points) (Ice Dogs)

Goodall Cup
- Champions: Western Sydney Ice Dogs
- Runners-up: Newcastle North Stars

AIHL seasons
- ← 2003 2005 →

The 2004 AIHL season was the fifth season of the Australian Ice Hockey League (AIHL). It ran from 1 May 2004 until 29 August 2004, with the Goodall Cup finals following on 4 and 5 September 2004. The Newcastle North Stars won the V.I.P. Cup after finishing the regular season first in the league standings. The Western Sydney Ice Dogs won the Goodall Cup for the first time by defeating the Newcastle North Stars in the final.

== Regular season ==
The regular season began on 1 May 2004 and ran through to 29 August 2004 before the top four teams advanced to compete in the Goodall Cup playoff series.

=== Standings ===
Team	GP	W	T	OTW	OTL	L	GF	GA	GDF	PTS
Newcastle North Stars	20	15	2	2	0	1	93	50	+43	51
Western Sydney Ice Dogs	20	11	0	0	2	7	92	71	+21	35
Sydney Bears	20	8	1	1	4	6	68	71	-3	31
Adelaide Avalanche	20	7	1	1	2	9	64	68	-4	29
Melbourne Ice	20	5	1	2	0	12	53	71	-18	20
Canberra Knights	20	3	1	2	0	14	53	109	-56	14

Qualified for the Goodall Cup playoffs	Premiership winners

=== Statistics ===
==== Scoring leaders ====
List shows the ten top skaters sorted by points, then goals. Current as of 5 September 2004

Player	Team	GP	G	A	Pts	PIM	POS
Martin Jesko	Western Sydney Ice Dogs	17	20	21	41	14	F
Sean Starke	Newcastle North Stars	17	19	19	38	51	F
John Heinen	Western Sydney Ice Dogs	18	17	21	38	18	F
Greg Oddy	Adelaide Avalanche	17	12	18	30	40	C
Rob Duchemin	Newcastle North Stars	19	16	11	27	46	F
Trevor Walsh	Adelaide Avalanche	17	16	10	26	110	C
Alex D'Jamirze	Western Sydney Ice Dogs	19	15	11	26	20	F
Steve Wasylko	Newcastle North Stars	19	12	14	26	26	C
Trent Ulmer	Sydney Bears	17	11	13	24	12	F
Robert Starke	Newcastle North Stars	18	10	14	24	62	D

==== Leading goaltenders ====
Only the top five goaltenders, based on save percentage with a minimum 40% of the team's ice time. Current as of 5 September 2004

Player	Team	MIP	SOG	GA	GAA	SVS%	SO
Matthew Ezzy	Newcastle North Stars	778	488	39	3.15	0.920	0
Kenric Exner	Sydney Bears	728	493	59	3.54	0.880	0
Eric Lien	Adelaide Avalanche	632	405	49	5.54	0.879	0
Gabe Robledo	Western Sydney Ice Dogs	272	134	18	4.06	0.866	0
Stuart Denman	Melbourne Ice	725	466	65	3.53	0.861	0

== Goodall Cup playoffs ==
The 2004 playoffs was scheduled for 4 September with the Goodall Cup final held on 5 September 2004. Following the end of the regular season the top four teams advanced to the playoff series which was held at the Erina Ice Arena in the Central Coast, New South Wales region. The series was a single game elimination with the two winning semi-finalists advancing to the Goodall Cup final. The Goodall Cup was won by Western Sydney Ice Dogs (1st title) who defeated the Newcastle North Stars 3–1 in the final.

Semifinals
1	Adelaide Avalanche	2
4	Newcastle North Stars	3
3	Sydney Bears	4
2	Western Sydney Ice Dogs	5

Final
Western Sydney Ice Dogs	3
Newcastle North Stars	1

All times are UTC+10:00

=== Semi-finals ===
4 September 2004; 17:49	Adelaide Avalanche	2–3 (2OT) (0–0, 0–1, 2–1, 0–0, 0–1)	Newcastle North Stars	Erina Ice Arena

Game reference

Eric Lien
Goalies
Matthew Ezzy
Referee:
Allan Wishewan
Linesmen:
Jamie Miller
JStephen De Witt

	0 – 1	S.Starke (Duchemin, Wasylko)
Martini (Harding)	1 – 1
Martini (Oddy)	2 – 1
	2 – 2	R.Starke (unassisted)
	2 – 3	Wilson (SH) (Ogilvie)

40 min
Penalties
38 min
34
Shots
32

4 September 2004	Sydney Bears	4–5	Western Sydney Ice Dogs	Erina Ice Arena

Game reference

=== Final ===
5 September 2004	Western Sydney Ice Dogs	3–1	Newcastle North Stars	Erina Ice Arena

Game reference
