= 2008 AIHL season =

- League: Australian Ice Hockey League
- Sport: Ice hockey
- Duration: 19 April 2008 – 31 August 2008

Regular season
- H Newman Reid Trophy: Sydney Bears (2nd title)
- Season MVP: Lliam Webster (Ice)
- Top scorer: Mickey Gilchrist (67 points) (North Stars)

Goodall Cup
- Champions: Newcastle North Stars
- Runners-up: Western Sydney Ice Dogs
- Finals MVP: Mickey Gilchrist (North Stars)

AIHL seasons
- 2007 2009

The 2008 AIHL season was the ninth season of the Australian Ice Hockey League (AIHL). It ran from 19 April 2008 until 24 August 2008, with the Goodall Cup finals following on 30 and 31 August 2008. The Bears won the H Newman Reid Trophy (backdated) after finishing the regular season first in the league standings. The Newcastle North Stars won the Goodall Cup for the fourth time by defeating the Western Sydney Ice Dogs in the final.

== League business ==
In 2008, Brisbane Blue Tongues became the Gold Coast Blue Tongues after the team relocated from Brisbane's Ice World in Boondall to Gold Coast's Iceland Bundall ice rink.

April 2008, the Hunter Ice Skating Stadium was significantly upgraded for the 2008 IIHF World Championship Division II, featuring plexi-glass boards, along with new lighting, scoreboards and expanded seating. The upgrade saw the Newcastle venue selected by the AIHL for the 2008 Goodall Cup finals weekend.

On 17 June, financial difficulties forced the Adelaide Avalanche to withdraw from the remainder of the 2008 season, leading to the cancellation and forfeiting of its 21 and 22 June games in Canberra and Penrith against the Knights (double points match) and Bears. Following negotiations, the Thebarton Ice Arena was one week later given a license for a new Adelaide team, the Adelaide A's, to fulfil the Avalanche's remaining commitments for the season, and inheriting their 2008 season results.

== Regular season ==
The regular season began on 19 April 2008 and will run through to 24 August 2008 before the top four teams advanced to compete in the Goodall Cup playoff series.

=== April ===
Date	Time	Away	Score	Home	Location	Recap
19 April	17:00	Gold Coast Blue Tongues	1–3	Newcastle North Stars	Hunter Ice Skating Stadium	
19 April	17:00	Canberra Knights	0–4	Adelaide A's	IceArenA	
19 April	17:30	Central Coast Rhinos	4–6	The Bears	Penrith Ice Palace	
20 April	16:30	Canberra Knights	0–2	Melbourne Ice	Olympic Ice Skating Centre	
20 April	17:00	Western Sydney Ice Dogs	3–5	The Bears	Penrith Ice Palace	
20 April	18:00	Gold Coast Blue Tongues	5–0 (Forfeit) (Note: The Central Coast Rhinos forfeited their first home match (originally a 5-1 victory) to the Gold Coast Blue Tongues by a margin of 5-0 after icing an IIHF and IHA uncleared import. Goaltender Markus Claesson was not cleared to play in the AIHL until 3 May.)	Central Coast Rhinos	Erina Ice Arena	
24 April	19:30	The Bears	6–5	Western Sydney Ice Dogs	Sydney Ice Arena	
26 April	16:30	Melbourne Ice	3–0	Adelaide A's	IceArenA	
26 April	17:30	Gold Coast Blue Tongues	3–4	Canberra Knights	Phillip Ice Skating Centre	
27 April	16:30	Melbourne Ice	6–5 (SO)	Adelaide A's	IceArenA	
27 April	17:00	Canberra Knights	3–2	Newcastle North Stars	Hunter Ice Skating Stadium	
27 April	18:00	Gold Coast Blue Tongues	2–10 (DP)	Western Sydney Ice Dogs	Sydney Ice Arena	

=== May ===
Date	Time	Away	Score	Home	Location	Recap
3 May	17:00	Newcastle North Stars	2–3 (SO)	Adelaide A's	IceArenA	
3 May	17:30	The Bears	5–3	Canberra Knights	Phillip Ice Skating Centre	
3 May	18:00	Western Sydney Ice Dogs	6–4	Central Coast Rhinos	Erina Ice Arena	
4 May	16:30	Newcastle North Stars	2–7	Melbourne Ice	Olympic Ice Skating Centre	
4 May	18:00	Canberra Knights	2–6	Western Sydney Ice Dogs	Sydney Ice Arena	
10 May	17:00	The Bears	4–3	Newcastle North Stars	Hunter Ice Skating Stadium	
10 May	17:30	Melbourne Ice	6–1 (DP)	Canberra Knights	Phillip Ice Skating Centre	
10 May	18:00	Central Coast Rhinos	1–2	Western Sydney Ice Dogs	Sydney Ice Arena	
11 May	17:00	Melbourne Ice	1–3 (DP)	The Bears	Penrith Ice Palace	
11 May	18:00	Newcastle North Stars	1–3	Central Coast Rhinos	Erina Ice Arena	
17 May	17:00	Central Coast Rhinos	4–3 (SO)	Adelaide A's	IceArenA	
17 May	17:30	Newcastle North Stars	3–2 (SO)	Canberra Knights	Phillip Ice Skating Centre	
17 May	18:00	The Bears	4–3	Melbourne Ice	Olympic Ice Skating Centre	
18 May	15:30	The Bears	4–3	Adelaide A's	IceArenA	
18 May	16:30	Central Coast Rhinos	4–6	Melbourne Ice	Olympic Ice Skating Centre	
18 May	17:00	Western Sydney Ice Dogs	3–2 (SO)	Newcastle North Stars	Hunter Ice Skating Stadium	
24 May	16:30	Canberra Knights	2–3 (SO)	Adelaide A's	IceArenA	
24 May	17:00	Western Sydney Ice Dogs	5–4 (SO)	Newcastle North Stars	Hunter Ice Skating Stadium	
25 May	16:30	Canberra Knights	3–2 (SO)	Melbourne Ice	Olympic Ice Skating Centre	
25 May	18:00	Newcastle North Stars	3–1	Western Sydney Ice Dogs	Sydney Ice Arena	
31 May	16:30	Western Sydney Ice Dogs	5–3	Adelaide A's	IceArenA	
31 May	17:30	Newcastle North Stars	7–1	Canberra Knights	Phillip Ice Skating Centre	
31 May	17:30	Central Coast Rhinos	4–5	The Bears	Penrith Ice Palace	

=== June ===
Date	Time	Away	Score	Home	Location	Recap
1 June	16:15	Western Sydney Ice Dogs	2–4	Melbourne Ice	Olympic Ice Skating Centre	
1 June	17:00	Canberra Knights	4–5	The Bears	Penrith Ice Palace	
7 June	17:30	The Bears	5–6	Canberra Knights	Phillip Ice Skating Centre	
7 June	17:45	Gold Coast Blue Tongues	3–10	Newcastle North Stars	Hunter Ice Skating Stadium	
7 June	18:00	Adelaide A's	2–5 (DP)	Central Coast Rhinos	Erina Ice Arena	
8 June	17:00	Adelaide A's	2–1 (DP)	Western Sydney Ice Dogs	Sydney Ice Arena	
8 June	17:30	Gold Coast Blue Tongues	5–4	Central Coast Rhinos	Erina Ice Arena	
14 June	15:30	The Bears	1–9	Gold Coast Blue Tongues	Gold Coast Iceland	
14 June	17:00	Melbourne Ice	3–8 (DP)	Newcastle North Stars	Hunter Ice Skating Stadium	
14 June	17:30	Central Coast Rhinos	4–2	Canberra Knights	Phillip Ice Skating Centre	
15 June	15:40	The Bears	4–5	Gold Coast Blue Tongues	Gold Coast Iceland	
15 June	17:00	Melbourne Ice	4–5	Western Sydney Ice Dogs	Sydney Ice Arena	
15 June	18:00	Canberra Knights	5–2	Central Coast Rhinos	Erina Ice Arena	
21 June	15:30	Newcastle North Stars	5–0	Gold Coast Blue Tongues	Gold Coast Iceland	
21 June	17:30	Western Sydney Ice Dogs	1–6	The Bears	Penrith Ice Palace	
21 June	17:30	Adelaide A's	0–5 (Forfeit) (Note: The Adelaide Avalanche forfeited their double point match to the Canberra Knights by a margin of 5-0 following the collapse of the franchise. The Adelaide A's would be established during the next week and the results, including the forfeit, was transferred to the new A's franchise.)	Canberra Knights	Phillip Ice Skating Centre	
22 June	15:30	Newcastle North Stars	5–4 (SO)	Gold Coast Blue Tongues	Gold Coast Iceland	
22 June	17:00	Adelaide A's	0–5 (Forfeit) (Note: The Adelaide Avalanche forfeited their match to the AIHL Bears by a margin of 5-0 following the collapse of the franchise. The Adelaide A's would be established during the next week and the results, including the forfeit, was transferred to the new A's franchise.)	The Bears	Penrith Ice Palace	
22 June	18:00	Canberra Knights	0–2	Central Coast Rhinos	Erina Ice Arena	
28 June	15:30	Central Coast Rhinos	2–0	Gold Coast Blue Tongues	Gold Coast Iceland	
28 June	17:30	Western Sydney Ice Dogs	5–4	Canberra Knights	Phillip Ice Skating Centre	
28 June	17:45	Adelaide A's	4–8	Melbourne Ice	Olympic Ice Skating Centre	
29 June	15:30	Central Coast Rhinos	4–9	Gold Coast Blue Tongues	Gold Coast Iceland	
29 June	16:30	Adelaide A's	0–4	Melbourne Ice	Olympic Ice Skating Centre	
29 June	18:00	Newcastle North Stars	3–8	Western Sydney Ice Dogs	Sydney Ice Arena	

=== July ===
Date	Time	Away	Score	Home	Location	Recap
5 July	16:45	Gold Coast Blue Tongues	5–6 (SO) (DP)	Adelaide A's	IceArenA	
5 July	17:45	Newcastle North Stars	2–5	Melbourne Ice	Olympic Ice Skating Centre	
5 July	18:00	The Bears	2–1	Central Coast Rhinos	Erina Ice Arena	
6 July	16:30	Gold Coast Blue Tongues	3–6 (DP)	Melbourne Ice	Olympic Ice Skating Centre	
6 July	16:30	Newcastle North Stars	9–10 (SO)	Adelaide A's	IceArenA	
6 July	18:00	Canberra Knights	2–3	Western Sydney Ice Dogs	Sydney Ice Arena	
12 July	15:30	Western Sydney Ice Dogs	7–4	Gold Coast Blue Tongues	Gold Coast Iceland	
12 July	18:00	Newcastle North Stars	6–3	Central Coast Rhinos	Erina Ice Arena	
13 July	15:30	Western Sydney Ice Dogs	2–5	Gold Coast Blue Tongues	Gold Coast Iceland	
13 July	16:30	The Bears	7–8	Melbourne Ice	Olympic Ice Skating Centre	
19 July	15:30	Canberra Knights	2–5	Gold Coast Blue Tongues	Gold Coast Iceland	
19 July	17:30	Newcastle North Stars	4–6	The Bears	Penrith Ice Palace	
19 July	18:00	Melbourne Ice	3–2 (DP)	Central Coast Rhinos	Erina Ice Arena	
20 July	15:30	Canberra Knights	7–3	Gold Coast Blue Tongues	Gold Coast Iceland	
20 July	15:30	The Bears	5–3	Adelaide A's	IceArenA	
20 July	17:00	Central Coast Rhinos	0–8	Newcastle North Stars	Hunter Ice Skating Stadium	
20 July	17:00	Melbourne Ice	2–8	Western Sydney Ice Dogs	Sydney Ice Arena	

=== August ===
Date	Time	Away	Score	Home	Location	Recap
2 August	16:30	Western Sydney Ice Dogs	2–3 (SO)	Adelaide A's	IceArenA	
2 August	17:30	Central Coast Rhinos	2–4	Canberra Knights	Phillip Ice Skating Centre	
2 August	17:30	Newcastle North Stars	10–2	The Bears	Penrith Ice Palace	
3 August	16:30	Western Sydney Ice Dogs	3–1	Melbourne Ice	Olympic Ice Skating Centre	
3 August	17:00	Central Coast Rhinos	3–13	Newcastle North Stars	Hunter Ice Skating Stadium	
9 August	15:30	Melbourne Ice	4–6	Gold Coast Blue Tongues	Gold Coast Iceland	
9 August	17:00	Adelaide A's	3–5 (DP)	Newcastle North Stars	Hunter Ice Skating Stadium	
9 August	17:30	Canberra Knights	5–2	The Bears	Penrith Ice Palace	
9 August	18:00	Western Sydney Ice Dogs	3–2 (SO)	Central Coast Rhinos	Erina Ice Arena	
10 August	15:30	Melbourne Ice	9–1	Gold Coast Blue Tongues	Gold Coast Iceland	
10 August	17:30	Adelaide A's	3–4	The Bears	Penrith Ice Palace	
16 August	16:30	Central Coast Rhinos	0–7	Adelaide A's	IceArenA	
16 August	17:30	Gold Coast Blue Tongues	6–9	Canberra Knights	Phillip Ice Skating Centre	
16 August	18:00	The Bears	7–8 (SO)	Western Sydney Ice Dogs	Sydney Ice Arena	
17 August	16:30	Central Coast Rhinos	1–8	Melbourne Ice	Olympic Ice Skating Centre	
17 August	17:00	Gold Coast Blue Tongues	4–8 (DP)	The Bears	Penrith Ice Palace	
17 August	17:00	Canberra Knights	5–7	Newcastle North Stars	Hunter Ice Skating Stadium	
23 August	15:30	Adelaide A's	3–2	Gold Coast Blue Tongues	Gold Coast Iceland	
23 August	17:30	Western Sydney Ice Dogs	7–4	Canberra Knights	Phillip Ice Skating Centre	
23 August	18:00	The Bears	9–3	Central Coast Rhinos	Erina Ice Arena	
24 August	15:30	Adelaide A's	7–0	Gold Coast Blue Tongues	Gold Coast Iceland	
24 August	19:00	The Bears	3–10	Newcastle North Stars	Hunter Ice Skating Stadium	
24 August	18:00	Central Coast Rhinos	2–4	Western Sydney Ice Dogs	Sydney Ice Arena	

=== Standings ===
Team	GP	W	SOW	SOL	L	GF	GA	GDF	PTS
The Bears	28	20	0	1	7	134	118	+16	61
Western Sydney Ice Dogs	28	15	4	1	8	126	91	+35	54
Melbourne Ice	28	17	1	1	9	124	91	+33	54
Newcastle North Stars	28	15	2	4	7	150	97	+53	53
Canberra Knights	28	10	1	2	15	91	107	-16	34
Adelaide A's	28	6	6	2	14	90	107	-17	32
Gold Coast Blue Tongues	28	8	0	3	17	104	154	-50	27
Central Coast Rhinos	28	6	1	1	20	73	129	-56	21

Qualified for the Goodall Cup playoffs	H Newman Reid Trophy winners

=== Statistics ===
==== Scoring leaders ====
List shows the ten top skaters sorted by points, then goals. Current as of 31 August 2008

Player	Team	GP	G	A	Pts	PIM	POS
Mickey Gilchrist	Newcastle North Stars	15	30	37	67	8	F
B.J. Pelkey	Newcastle North Stars	21	35	30	65	14	F
Vladan Stransky	The Bears	25	22	42	64	34	F
Ryan Tremblay	Western Sydney Ice Dogs	23	23	28	51	40	F
Vladimir Rubes	The Bears	25	16	35	51	12	F
Colin Nicholson	Newcastle North Stars	14	17	30	47	0	C
Lliam Webster	Melbourne Ice	20	24	22	46	61	F
Marko Raita	Canberra Knights	25	17	25	42	22	F
Vit Stransky	The Bears	15	22	19	41	12	F
Kyle Teague	Western Sydney Ice Dogs	20	14	25	39	42	F

==== Leading goaltenders ====
Only the top five goaltenders, based on save percentage with a minimum 40% of the team's ice time. Current as of 31 August 2008

Player	Team	MIP	SOG	GA	GAA	SVS%	SO
Matthew Ezzy	Newcastle North Stars	879	525	53	3.01	0.899	2
Markus Claesson	Central Coast Rhinos	803	554	68	4.23	0.877	2
Christopher Elf	Adelaide A's	630	352	48	3.81	0.864	1
James Herbert	Western Sydney Ice Dogs	663	347	48	3.62	0.862	0
Stuart Denman	Melbourne Ice	942	444	66	3.50	0.851	3

== Goodall Cup playoffs ==
The 2008 playoffs was scheduled for 30 August with the Goodall Cup final held on 31 August 2008. Following the end of the regular season the top four teams advanced to the playoff series which was held at the redeveloped Hunter Ice Skating Stadium in Warners Bay, Newcastle, New South Wales. The series was a single game elimination with the two winning semi-finalists advancing to the Goodall Cup final. The Goodall Cup was won by the Newcastle North Stars (4th title) who defeated the Western Sydney Ice Dogs 4–1. The North Star's Canadian import forward, Mickey Gilchrist, was named the finals most valuable player (MVP).

Semifinals
1	Newcastle North Stars	7
4	The Bears	5
3	Western Sydney Ice Dogs	2
2	Melbourne Ice	1

Final
Newcastle North Stars	4
Western Sydney Ice Dogs	1

All times are UTC+10:00

=== Semi-finals ===
30 August 2008; 16:30	Newcastle North Stars	7–5 (2–1, 3–1, 2–3)	The Bears	Hunter Ice Skating Stadium; Attendance: 700

Game reference

Matthew Ezzy
Goalies
John Daugulis
Referee:
Jeff Scott
Linesmen:
Tim Bell
Darren Hardy-Hawken

Buckley (PP) (Carberry, Minson)	1 – 0
Nicholson (PP) (Pelkey, Gilchrist)	2 – 0
	2 – 1	Wand (PP) (Gribben, Stransky)
Nicholson (Starke, Gilchrist)	3 – 1
Pelkey (Nicholson, Gilchrist)	4 – 1
	4 – 2	Nelson-Bond (Wand, Gribben)
Sheffield (Carberry)	5 – 2
Nicholson (Gilchrist, Pelkey)	6 – 2
	6 – 3	Stransky (Rubes)
	6 – 4	Gribben (Stransky)
Carberry (Minson)	7 – 4
	7 – 5	Shumak (SH) (Gribben)

22 min
Penalties
16 min
41
Shots
23

30 August 2008; 19:30	Melbourne Ice	1–2 (OT) (1–1, 0–0, 0–0, 0–1)	Western Sydney Ice Dogs	Hunter Ice Skating Stadium; Attendance: 500

Game reference

Stuart Denman
Goalies
James Herbert
Referee:
Rob Duchemin
Linesmen:
Chris Mason
Steve Clyde-Smith

Powell (PP) (Ferguson, Tremblay)	1 – 0
	1 – 1	Angyal (PP) (White, T.Stephenson)
	1 – 2	Sheddon (unassisted)

16 min
Penalties
24 min
23
Shots
27

=== Final ===
31 August 2008; 16:00	Newcastle North Stars	4–1 (1–0, 1–1, 2–0)	Western Sydney Ice Dogs	Hunter Ice Skating Stadium; Attendance: 900

Game reference

Matthew Ezzy
Goalies
James Herbert
Referee:
Jeff Scott
Linesmen:
Chris Mason
Steve Clyde-Smith

Pelkey (PP) (Nicholson, Starke)	1 – 0
	1 – 1	Strang (unassisted)
Gilchrist (SH) (Nicholson)	2 – 1
Gilchrist (SH) (Nicholson, Buckley)	3 – 1
Gilchrist (unassisted)	4 – 1

26 min
Penalties
26 min
34
Shots
31
