= V.I.P. Cup =

- Sport: Ice hockey
- Awarded for: Australian Ice Hockey League team with the most points in the regular season

History
- First award: 2004
- Most recent: None (Retired trophy)

The V.I.P. Cup is a retired trophy that was awarded to the minor premiers of each season in the Australian Ice Hockey League from 2004 to 2009; that is, the team that finishes first overall in the standings at the end of the regular season. The trophy is named for its sponsor, V.I.P. Home Services.

The last winners of the trophy are the Newcastle North Stars, who finished at the top of the standings in the 2009 AIHL season, but lost the grand final against the Adelaide Adrenaline. Since its inception in 2004, the V.I.P. Cup winner has never managed to claim the Goodall Cup in the corresponding playoff series.

The V.I.P. Cup was replaced for the 2010 season with the H Newman Reid Trophy, which was awarded to the Newcastle North Stars. The H Newman Reid Trophy ended up being backdated to 2008.

== Winners ==
Year	Winner	Points	Playoff result
2004	Newcastle North Stars	51	Lost in Goodall Cup final (West Sydney Ice Dogs)
2005	Adelaide Avalanche	60	Lost in Goodall Cup final (Newcastle North Stars)
2006	Melbourne Ice	65	Lost semi-final (Newcastle North Stars)
2007	Adelaide Avalanche	56	Lost semi-final (Bears)
2008	Bears	61	Lost semi-final (Newcastle North Stars)
2009	Newcastle North Stars	55	Lost Goodall Cup final (Adelaide Adrenaline)

== See also ==
- Presidents' Trophy, the National Hockey League equivalent
- H Newman Reid Trophy, the current AIHL equivalent
