= 2003 AIHL season =

- League: Australian Ice Hockey League
- Sport: Ice hockey
- Duration: 3 May 2003 – 7 September 2003

Regular season
- Premiers: Adelaide Avalanche (2nd title)
- Season MVP: Dylan Martini (Avalanche)
- Top scorer: Pavel Shtefan (North Stars)

Goodall Cup
- Champions: Newcastle North Stars
- Runners-up: Western Sydney Ice Dogs

AIHL seasons
- ← 2002 2004 →

The 2003 AIHL season was the fourth season of the Australian Ice Hockey League (AIHL). It ran from 3 May 2003 until 29 August 2003, with the Goodall Cup finals following on 6 and 7 September 2003. The Adelaide Avalanche won the Premiership after finishing the regular season first in the league standings. The Newcastle North Stars won the Goodall Cup for the first time by defeating the Western Sydney Ice Dogs in the final.

== League business ==
In 2003, AIHL President Tony Lane introduced the 'top four' finals (playoff) format that replaced the one off final format used in the first three seasons of the AIHL. The new format saw the top four placed teams in the regular season standings qualify for the finals weekend where first would play fourth and second would face off against third in a single match elimination with the two winning teams advancing to the Goodall Cup final and he two losing teams advancing to the third place play-off, however this only occurred in 2003 and was dropped from the format in future years.

== Regular season ==
The regular season began on 3 May 2003 and ran through to 29 August 2003 before the top four teams advanced to compete in the Goodall Cup playoff series.

=== Fixtures and results ===
The 2003 season consisted of 60 fixtures that were scheduled between 3 May and 29 August. Each of the six teams where scheduled to play 20 games, with four games designated double-points games, where the one result counts towards two games, to save on travel costs. Game 58 between the Canberra Knights and Adelaide Avalanche was cancelled due to ice problems at the rink inside Snowdome Adelaide. It was decided game 59 on the Sunday between the two teams would count as a double-points game instead, raising the number of double-points games for the 2003 season to five.

==== May ====
May
Game #	Date	Time	Away	Score	Home	Location
1	3 May 2003	17:30	Ice Dogs	8–0	Knights	Phillip Ice Skating Centre
2	3 May 2003	17:00	Bears	4–7	North Stars	Hunter Ice Skating Stadium
3	4 May 2003	17:30	Ice Dogs	9–6	Bears	Sydney Ice Arena
4	10 May 2003	17:30	Knights	3–8	Ice Dogs	Blacktown Ice Arena
5	10 May 2003	18:00	North Stars	9–3	Ice	Olympic Ice Skating Centre
6	11 May 2003	15:00	North Stars	9–0	Ice	Bendigo Ice Skating Stadium
7	17 May 2003	16:30	Ice	3–8	Avalanche	Snowdome Adelaide
8	17 May 2003	17:30	Bears	3–5	Ice Dogs	Blacktown Ice Arena
9	17 May 2003	17:30	North Stars	7–3	Knights	Phillip Ice Skating Centre
10	18 May 2003	16:15	Ice	3–5	Avalanche	Snowdome Adelaide
11	18 May 2003	17:30	Knights	3–7	Bears	Sydney Ice Arena
12	24 May 2003	17:30	Avalanche	12–1	Knights	Phillip Ice Skating Centre
13-14	25 May 2003	17:30	Avalanche	4–3	Ice Dogs	Blacktown Ice Arena
15	25 May 2003	17:00	Knights	4–11	North Stars	Hunter Ice Skating Stadium
16	31 May 2003	16:30	Bears	1–4	Avalanche	Snowdome Adelaide
17	31 May 2003	18:00	Knights	1–7	Ice	Olympic Ice Skating Centre
18	31 May 2003	17:00	Ice Dogs	2–4	North Stars	Hunter Ice Skating Stadium

==== June ====
June
Game #	Date	Time	Away	Score	Home	Location
19	1 Jun 2003	15:00	Knights	0–4	Ice	Bendigo Ice Skating Stadium
20	1 Jun 2003	16:30	Bears	2–6	Avalanche	Snowdome Adelaide
Bye for all teams - Long weekend
21	14 Jun 2003	17:30	Ice Dogs	3–5	Knights	Phillip Ice Skating Centre
22	14 Jun 2003	18:00	Avalanche	4–2	Ice	Olympic Ice Skating Centre
23	15 Jun 2003	15:00	Avalanche	4–1	Ice	Bendigo Ice Skating Stadium
24	15 Jun 2003	17:00	Knights	1–5	North Stars	Hunter Ice Skating Stadium
25	15 Jun 2003	17:30	Ice Dogs	2–4	Bears	Sydney Ice Arena
26	21 Jun 2003	16:30	Ice Dogs	3–2	Avalanche	Snowdome Adelaide
27-28	21 Jun 2003	17:30	Ice	3–1	Knights	Phillip Ice Skating Centre
29	21 Jun 2003	17:00	Bears	1–2	North Stars	Hunter Ice Skating Stadium
30	22 Jun 2003	16:15	Ice Dogs	6–7	Avalanche	Snowdome Adelaide
31	22 Jun 2003	17:00	Ice	1–7	Bears	Sydney Ice Arena
Bye for all teams - Brown Trophy tournament

==== July ====
July
Game #	Date	Time	Away	Score	Home	Location
32	5 Jul 2003	17:30	Ice	3–3	Ice Dogs	Blacktown Ice Arena
33	5 Jul 2003	17:30	Bears	2–8	Knights	Phillip Ice Skating Centre
34	6 Jul 2003	17:00	Ice Dogs	2–8	North Stars	Hunter Ice Skating Stadium
35	6 Jul 2003	17:00	Ice	1–3	Bears	Sydney Ice Arena
36	12 Jul 2003	17:30	Avalanche	5–2	Knights	Phillip Ice Skating Centre
37	13 Jul 2003	17:00	Avalanche	9–5	North Stars	Hunter Ice Skating Stadium
38	19 Jul 2003	16:30	North Stars	2–10	Avalanche	Snowdome Adelaide
39	20 Jul 2003	16:15	North Stars	4–8	Avalanche	Snowdome Adelaide
40	26 Jul 2003	17:30	North Stars	6–5	Ice Dogs	Blacktown Ice Arena
41	26 Jul 2003	17:30	Bears	4–1	Knights	Phillip Ice Skating Centre
42	27 Jul 2003	17:30	North Stars	3–2	Bears	Sydney Ice Arena

==== August ====
August
Game #	Date	Time	Away	Score	Home	Location
43	2 Aug 2003	17:30	Knights	1–9	Ice Dogs	Blacktown Ice Arena
44	2 Aug 2003	18:00	Bears	9–5	Ice	Olympic Ice Skating Centre
45	3 Aug 2003	15:00	Bears	5–0	Ice	Bendigo Ice Skating Stadium
46	3 Aug 2003	17:30	North Stars	4–2	Ice Dogs	Blacktown Ice Arena
47	9 Aug 2003	17:30	Ice	1–11	Ice Dogs	Blacktown Ice Arena
48	9 Aug 2003	17:00	Avalanche	10–3	North Stars	Hunter Ice Skating Stadium
49-50	10 Aug 2003	17:00	Avalanche	5–6	Bears	Sydney Ice Arena
51-52	10 Aug 2003	17:00	Ice	1–9	North Stars	Hunter Ice Skating Stadium
53	16 Aug 2003	17:30	North Stars	7–5	Knights	Phillip Ice Skating Centre
54	16 Aug 2003	18:00	Ice Dogs	4–3	Ice	Olympic Ice Skating Centre
55	17 Aug 2003	15:00	Ice Dogs	5–0	Ice	Bendigo Ice Skating Stadium
56	17 Aug 2003	17:30	Knights	2–8	Bears	Sydney Ice Arena
57	23 Aug 2003	17:30	Bears	3–6	Ice Dogs	Blacktown Ice Arena
58	23 Aug 2003	16:30	Knights	Cancelled	Avalanche	Snowdome Adelaide
59	24 Aug 2003	16:15	Knights	1–12	Avalanche	Snowdome Adelaide
60	24 Aug 2003	17:30	North Stars	2–7	Bears	Sydney Ice Arena

Key:

Winner	Tie

=== Standings ===
The 2003 AIHL season statistics and standings are incomplete. No one source has all the information and the AIHL has not published official statistics on www.theaihl.com. The Statistics for the following table comes from Elite Prospects with the final placings coming from hockeyarchives.

Team	GP	W	T	OTW	OTL	L	GF	GA	GDF	PTS
Adelaide Avalanche	7	7	0	0	0	0	43	16	+27	14
Newcastle North Stars	6	6	0	0	0	0	47	17	+30	12
Sydney Bears	6	1	0	0	0	5	23	34	−11	2
Western Sydney Ice Dogs	7	4	0	0	0	2	38	24	+8	8
Melbourne Ice	6	2	0	0	0	4	20	32	−12	4
Canberra Knights	8	0	0	0	0	8	16	64	−48	0

Qualified for the Goodall Cup playoffs	Premiership winners

The statistics for the following table comes from the Newcastle North Stars and includes double point games.

Team	GP	W	T	OTW	OTL	L	GF	GA	GDF	PTS
Adelaide Avalanche	18	15	0	0	0	3	98	52	+46	30
Newcastle North Stars	19	14	0	0	0	5	101	76	+25	28
Sydney Bears	18	11	0	0	0	7	74	64	+10	22
Western Sydney Ice Dogs	18	10	1	0	0	8	90	64	+26	21
Melbourne Ice	19	4	1	0	0	14	46	92	−46	9
Canberra Knights	18	1	0	0	0	17	45	106	−61	2

Qualified for the Goodall Cup playoffs	Premiership winners

=== Statistics ===
==== Scoring leaders ====
List shows the ten top skaters sorted by points, then goals.

Player	Team	GP	G	A	Pts	PIM	POS
Pavel Shtefan	Newcastle North Stars	6	8	11	19	2	F
Daryl Bat	Newcastle North Stars	6	10	7	17	8	C
Greg Oddy	Adelaide Avalanche	6	10	7	17	10	F
Jake Ludvig	Newcastle North Stars	6	8	7	15	2	
Vladimir Rubes	Sydney Bears	4	5	9	14	0	F
Chris Sekura	West Sydney Ice Dogs	6	2	10	12	31	F
Dylan Martini	Adelaide Avalanche	6	1	11	12	12	D
Phillipe Roussell	West Sydney Ice Dogs	6	8	3	11	22	F
Murray Wand	Sydney Bears	6	5	5	10	8	F
Trevor Walsh	Adelaide Avalanche	5	4	6	10	31	F

==== Leading goaltenders ====
Only the top five goaltenders, based on save percentage.

Player	Team	MIP	SOG	GA	GAA	SVS%	SO
Bill Benedictson	Adelaide Avalanche	135:00	70	6	2.00	91.43	0
Eric Lein	Adelaide Avalanche	135:00	70	7	2.33	90.00	0
Trevor Battaglia	Newcastle North Stars	270:00	166	17	2.83	89.76	0
Alan Becken	West Sydney Ice Dogs	224:10	132	16	3.21	87.88	1
Stuart Denman	Melbourne Ice	135:00	89	15	5.00	83.15	0

== Goodall Cup playoffs ==
The 2003 playoffs, known in 2003 as the 'Canadian Club On Ice Finals Series' for sponsorship reasons, was scheduled for 6 September with the Goodall Cup final and 3rd place play-off held on 7 September 2003. Following the end of the regular season the top four teams advanced to the playoff series which was held at the Sydney Ice Arena (then known as the new Sydney Glaciarium, but not to be confused with the original Sydney Glaciarium that closed in 1955) in Sydney. The series was a single game elimination with the two winning semi-finalists advancing to the Goodall Cup final and the two losing teams advancing to the third place play-off. The Goodall Cup was won by Newcastle North Stars (1st title) who defeated the Western Sydney Ice Dogs 4–1 in the final. The hosts, Sydney Bears, who were without their number one goaltender Joel Gibson for the weekend due to injury, secured third spot with a high scoring 10–5 victory over league Premiers Adelaide Avalanche.

Semi-finals
6 September –
Adelaide Avalanche	1
Western Sydney Ice Dogs	4
6 September –
Newcastle North Stars	7
Sydney Bears	4

Final
7 September –
Western Sydney Ice Dogs	1
Newcastle North Stars	4
Third place
7 September –
Adelaide Avalanche	5
Sydney Bears	10

All times are UTC+10:00

=== Semi-finals ===
6 September 2003	Adelaide Avalanche	1–4 (1–2, 0–0, 0–2)	Western Sydney Ice Dogs	Sydney Ice Arena

Game reference

Eric Lein
Goalies
Allan Becken

	0–1	Martin Jesko (Jason Haakstad, Kris Galloux)
(Trevor Walsh, Dylan Martini) Greg Oddy	1–1
	1–2	Brett Thomas (Chris Sekura, Andrew Petrie)
	1–3	Martin Jesko (Andrew White, Anthony Wilson)
	1–4	Jason Haakstad (unassisted)

31
Shots
22

6 September 2003	Newcastle North Stars	7–4 (3–2, 1–1, 3–1)	Sydney Bears	Sydney Ice Arena

Game reference

Trevor Battaglia
Goalies
Nick Windle

	0–1	Jakub Petr (Paul Shumak, Vladimir Rubes)
(Trevor Battaglia) Jake Ludvig	1–1
	1–2	Vladan Stransky (Vladimir Rubes, Tyler Lovering)
(Trevor Battaglia) Pavel Shtefan	2–2
(Andrew Ogilvie, Daryl Bat) Jake Ludvig	3–2
(Henry Acres, Pavel Shtefan) Daryl Bat	4–2
	4–3	Andrew Truman (Vladimir Rubes)
(Trevor Battaglia, Ray Sheffield) Pavel Shtefan	5–3
(Trevor Battaglia, Henry Acres) Daryl Bat	6–3
(unassisted) Jake Ludvig	7–3
	7–4	Vladimir Rubes (Murray Wand)

25
Shots
37

=== 3rd place ===
7 September 2003	Adelaide Avalanche	5–10 (1–4, 3–2, 1–4)	Sydney Bears	Sydney Ice Arena

Game reference

Bill Benidictson
Goalies
Nick Windle

	0–1	Murray Wand (Tyler Lovering)
	0–2	Bret Nelson-Bond (Carl Di Pizza, Paul Shumak)
	0–3	Vladan Stransky (Vladimir Rubes)
	0–4	Vladimir Rubes (Mark Acheson, Dean Eisler)
(Luke Thilthorpe, Travis Watt) James Keane	1–4
Greg Oddy	2–4
Greg Oddy	3–4
Greg Oddy	4–4
	4–5	Don Burke
	4–6	Jakub Petr
	4–7	Paul Shumak
	4–8	Jakub Petr
(Dylan Martini) Derek DeCosty	5–8
	5–9	Carl Di Pizza
	5–10	Vladimir Rubes

18
Shots
45

=== Final ===
7 September 2003	Western Sydney Ice Dogs	1–4 (0–1, 1–2, 0–1)	Newcastle North Stars	Sydney Ice Arena; Attendance: 800

Game reference

Allan Becken
Goalies
Trevor Battaglia

	0 – 1	3:08 – Sheffield (PP) (Bat, Shtefan)
	0 – 2	15:56 – Bat (Sheffield, McInnes)
	0 – 3	16:50 – McInnes (Sheffield, Shtefan)
17:36 – Jesko (PP) (Wilson, Haakstad)	1 – 3
	1 – 4	36:50 – Ludvig (Duchemin)

2 min
Penalties
2 min
35
Shots
34
