= Central Coast Rhinos =

- City: Erina, New South Wales
- League: Australian Ice Hockey League
- Conference: Rurak
- Founded: 2005 (21 years ago)
- Operated: 2005–2012; 2022–present
- Home arena: Erina Ice Arena
- Colours: Deep sea blue, shadow blue, ice blue, red alert
- General manager: (Australia) Ellis Southee
- Head coach: (Australia) Ron Kuprowsky
- Captain: (Australia) Robert Malloy
- Website: rhinos.com.au

Franchise history
- 2005–06: Blue Haven Rhinos
- 2007–present: Central Coast Rhinos

Championships
- H Newman Reid Trophies: 0
- Goodall Cups: 0

The Central Coast Rhinos are a semi-professional ice hockey team based in Erina, New South Wales, Australia. The team is a member of the Australian Ice Hockey League (AIHL). The team was founded in 2005 as an expansion team in the AIHL and played in the league for four seasons between 2005 and 2008. The Rhinos left the league in 2009 and joined the Australian International Ice Hockey Cup, where it competed for four seasons between 2009 and 2012. Central Coast were granted a provisional AIHL license in 2022 to play exhibition games and were successful in rejoining the AIHL in 2023. The Rhinos' home venue is the Erina Ice Arena, located within the Erina Fair Shopping Centre on the New South Wales Central Coast.

== History ==
=== Establishment and first AIHL era (2005–2008) ===
Founding logo used between 2006-07 when the team was sponsored by Blue Haven Pools

The Central Coast Rhinos were founded in 2005 as the Blue Haven Rhinos in Erina, New South Wales. The Rhinos were announced as an Australian Ice Hockey League (AIHL) expansion team in 2005 after securing an AIHL license. The team joined the AIHL along with fellow newcomers the Brisbane Blue Tongues, raising the league membership from six to eight teams. The Rhinos chose the Erina Ice Arena, which had recently opened in 2004, as their home venue on the Central Coast. Team governance for 2005 saw Bob Roberts elected the first Chairman of the Board for the Rhinos and Rick Williams appointed as a Director.

The Rhinos' inaugural AIHL game was against the Canberra Knights at Erina Ice Arena on 17 April 2005. The new team was defeated 10–1 by the vastly more experienced Knights. Canberra took a five-goal lead into the first break before the Rhinos held the Knights to a 1–1 second period. The third period ended like the first with the Knights putting on four unanswered goals. The game was feisty, with the Rhinos racking up 93 penalty minutes along with 57 for the Knights.

The first AIHL win for the Rhinos came at home at Erina on 15 May 2005 against the Western Sydney Ice Dogs. The two teams played a tightly contested game that ended 4–4 after regulation. Blair Collins gave the Rhinos the lead in the first period, and from there it was tit for tat until the final buzzer in the third period. Blue Haven won in overtime with a power play goal by Bryce Conrad sealing the game for the Rhinos 5–4.

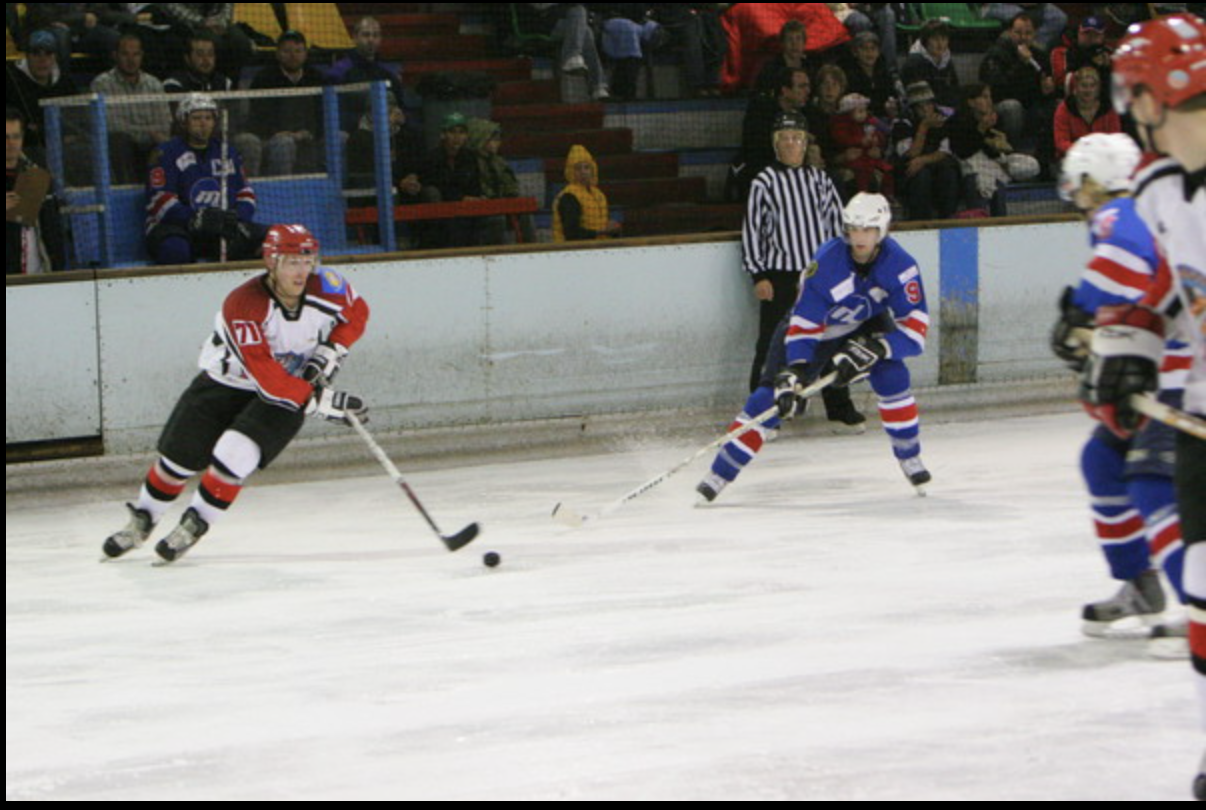
A game between Central Coast Rhinos and Melbourne Ice (2005)

The Rhinos finished their maiden AIHL season last in the league ladder, 14 points adrift of the Melbourne Ice in seventh. In 26 games, they had produced 4 wins, 1 tie, 2 overtime wins and losses, and 17 regulation losses, giving the team a 24% win rate. The Rhinos did not qualify for the 2005 finals weekend, held in Newcastle, to play for the Goodall Cup. Blue Haven's David Wong finished the 2005 season with the third highest saves percentage, 0.865, out of any goaltender in the league. Czech import forward Dusan Halloun was the Rhinos highest points scorer for the season, ending with twenty-eight points from twenty games including ten goals and eighteen assists.

The team's performances in 2006 remained relatively similar to their opening campaign. Six wins and twenty-two losses gave them one less point in the league ladder than in 2005. However, the Rhinos final league position had improved from the previous season and Blue Haven had managed to avoid the wooden spoon by finishing seventh above the Canberra Knights. Canadian forward Mitch Strang produced the Rhino's best AIHL season points return by a single player with forty-four points in 2006. Strang's record included twenty-two goals and assists. David Wong once again led the goaltending stats for the Rhinos in 2006 with a 0.829 save percentage.

2007 and 2008 saw little improvement for the Rhinos. In 2007, the team's sponsorship with Blue Haven ended, so the team became known as the Central Coast Rhinos. On the ice, the Rhinos continued to struggle and finished last in the league standings in both seasons, failing to qualify for finals. 2007 was particularly bad with just two regulation wins and one overtime win all season. Swedish centre Håkan Olsson was the team's top points scorer in 2007 with thirty-eight points, while Canadian Jon MacMillian was the Rhinos best goaltender with a save percentage of 0.834. In 2008 Swedish pair Simon Kummu and Markus Claesson topped the team's scoring and goaltending charts with thirty points and 0.807 save percentage respectfully.

Ahead of the 2009 season, the Rhinos participated in the annual Wilson Cup along with the other three NSW-based AIHL teams (Ice Dogs, Newcastle North Stars and AIHL Bears). The cup was played in the AIHL pre-season and acted as a warm-up event to the regular season to promote youth development. The home and away round-robin format was followed by a play-off and grand final. Central Coast won the 2009 edition of the Wilson Cup, lifting the team's first-ever trophy by defeating the Western Sydney Ice Dogs 4–3 in a shootout in the cup final.

However, the Wilson Cup triumph would prove to be the Rhinos' final involvement with the AIHL and against AIHL opponents. Central Coast's owner, Ellis Southee, did not sign a new license contract with the AIHL after disagreements around the terms of the new licensing arrangements could not be resolved in time for the 2009 season. The result was the withdrawal of the Central Coast Rhinos from the AIHL and the forfeiting of the AIHL license the team held.

Rhino's Australian International Ice Hockey Cup record
Season	P	W	OW	OL	L	GF	GA	Pts	Finish	Playoffs
2009	13	7	0	0	6	54	46	21	1st	Runner-up
2010	11	?	5	0	?	?	?	?	2nd	Runner-up
2011	8	5	0	1	2	50	36	16	2nd	Runner-up
2012	4	0	0	0	4	12	32	0	4th	DNQ

=== Australian International Ice Hockey Cup era (2009–2012) ===
After leaving the AIHL, the Central Coast Rhinos joined the newly created independent annual ice hockey tournament named Australian International Ice Hockey Cup (AIIHC). The tournament was held in Sydney, at the Sydney Ice Arena and the Central Coast, at the Erina Ice Arena, and was administered by the operator of the two rinks. It featured the Rhinos along with selection teams representing Canada (Maples), the United States (Eagles) and Europe (Stars). The operation of AIIHC led to a notice to the Australian Competition & Consumer Commission (ACCC) regarding the application of suspensions and expulsions by Ice Hockey Australia on non-sanctioned ice hockey events and participants in Australia.

The Rhinos enjoyed a successful period playing in the AIIHC between 2009 and 2012. In 2009, they finished the round-robin section of the tournament first after thirteen games, clinching a spot in the play-offs. On 15 August 2009, the Rhinos faced the Canadian Maples in the AIIHC grand final at Erina Ice Arena. In front of 750 people, Central Coast were defeated 7–4 despite taking a two-goal lead in the first period. Th Rhinos would go on to reach the grand final of the AIIHC two more times, in 2010 and 2011, even with the AIIHC expanding in 2011 to five teams (Rhinos, Eagles, Toronto Moose, Montreal Maples and Sydney International Giants). Just Like in 2009, Central Coast would come away runners-up on both occasions, losing the grand finals to the Canadian Maples and USA Eagles respectfully. In 2012 the tournament was played in a shorter format and the Rhinos lost all four of their games, failing to qualify for the grand final. In 2013, the AIIHC switched the format of the tournament to being a two team (USA vs Canada) format, leaving the Central Coast Rhinos without a competition to compete in.

In addition to the AIIHC, during this period, in 2010, the Rhinos entered and competed in the NSW East Coast Super League (ECSL) for one season. The team finished first in the regular season but were knocked out of the play-offs in the semi-finals. In 2011, the Rhinos welcomed the New Zealand National Ice hockey Team to Erina in a two game exhibition series held on 27 March and 1 April 2011.

=== Wilderness (2013–2021) ===
In 2013-14 the Rhinos lined up two exhibition games against the Sydney Bears at Erina Ice Arena. This was the first re-engagement with the AIHL since the team had left in 2009. The first of these matches was played on 16 November 2013, and saw the Rhinos win 8–4. Game two saw the Bears reverse the result and defeat the hosts 8–2, in their lead-up to the Wilson Cup and 2014 AIHL season.

On 17 October 2014, the Rhinos announced they had applied to re-enter the AIHL for the 2015 season. Central Coast lodged its application for an AIHL license at the 2014 AIHL annual general meeting (AGM) in October. Two days later the AIHL revealed they had rejected the re-entry application by the Central Coast Rhinos but did not publicly disclose any reasons for their decision. The decision continued the hiatus of top-level ice hockey on the Central Coast.

In 2019, the owner of the Erina Ice Arena, Lendlease, announced the rink would close for mandatory upgrades to meet legislative standards that has been updated since the arena was built in 2004. The closure of the rink would last for one year. On 3 January 2021, Erina Ice Arena reopened to the public following the completion of the mandatory upgrade works. In February 2022, Erina Ice Arena management announced they had been successful in obtaining a NSW Government regional sports facility fund grant of almost $600,000 for upgrade improvements to the rink. The money would be spent primarily on upgrades to the bathroom, lighting, and ice hockey netting, as well as safety and accessibility improvements to the foyer and grandstand.

=== Re-entry to the AIHL (since 2022) ===
The Rhinos revealed in March 2022 that they had re-applied to the AIHL after having their 2014 bid rejected. The news came on the back of the rival Pacific Hockey League announcing a new team, The Coast, to play at Erina Ice Arena in 2022. Three days later on 10 March the AIHL granted the Rhinos a new license for the AIHL and announced the team would play exhibition games against AIHL opposition in 2022 before joining the league's regular season in 2023.

In early April 2022, the AIHL released its revised 2022 season game schedule with the Central Coast Rhinos scheduled to play seven exhibition games, both home and away, between April and August 2022. These games involve four AIHL teams including, Sydney Ice Dogs, Brisbane Lightning, CBR Brave and Sydney Bears. In mid-April, an additional pre-season exhibition game was added to the Rhinos 2022 schedule against the Bears to be held at Erina on 24 April.

After completing the 2022 exhibition game schedule, in September 2022, the AIHL admitted the Rhinos into the league by granting them a full license. Central Coast would officially re-join the AIHL regular season in 2023. In April 2023, the team formally updated their logo and kit designs and changed the team’s colours from red, black and white to shadow blue, ice blue, deep sea blue and red alert.

For the team’s first season back in the AIHL, they hired Ashley Marsh as their head coach, after he guided the team in their exhibition series in 2022. Robert ‘Bert’ Malloy was named captain and would be assisted by veterans Stuart Cole-Clark, Jayson Chalker and David-James ‘DJ’ Jeremy. The Rhinos lost their opening game back in the AIHL after fourteen years, going down to fellow newcomers, Brisbane Lightning, 17–0. The team slowly improved over the course of the season and registered their first win, since returning to the league, in June 2023, with a 6-3 defeat of Adelaide Adrenaline on the road in Adelaide. Swedish import forward, Joakim Erdugan, scoring four of the Rhino’s six goals in the win. It was the Rhino’s first AIHL win in 5,461 days.

== Season-by-season results ==
=== Australian Ice Hockey League ===
Central Coast Rhinos all-time record
Season	Regular season											Finals									Wilson Cup	Top points scorer
Season	P	W	T^{1}	L	OW	OL	GF	GA	GD	Pts	Finish	P	W	L	GF	GA	Result	R1	SF	GF	Wilson Cup	Name	Points
2005	26	4	1	17	2	2	67	148	-81	19	8th	–									–	(Czech Republic) Dusan Halloun	28
2006	28	6	–	22	0	0	93	158	-65	18	7th	–									–	(Canada) Mitch Strang	44
2007	28	2	–	24	0	2	71	142	-71	9	8th	–									Group	(Sweden) Håkan Olsson	38
2008	28	6	–	20	1	1	73	129	-56	21	8th	–									Group	(Sweden) Simon Kummu	30
2009	Withdrew from the AIHL																				Winners
2009–12	Contested the Australian International Ice Hockey Cup
2013–21	Non-operational
2022	Played seven exhibition games on provisional licence, seeking acceptance for full AIHL licence for Season 2023
2023	26	1	–	24	1	0	75	245	-170	5	10th	–									–	(Sweden) Joakim Erdugan	49
2024	30	4	–	21	3	2	81	170	-89	25	10th	–									–	(Australia) Robert Malloy	28
2025	28	2	–	21	3	2	93	183	-90	14	8th	–									–	(Australia) Dmitri Kuleshov	34
2026	–	–	–	–	–	–	–	–	–	–	–	–	–	–	–	–	–	–	–	–	–	–	–
Totals	194	25	1	149	10	9	553	1175	-622

^{1} From the 2006 AIHL season, all games must have a winner.

Champions	Runners-up	Third place

== Honours ==
=== Championships ===
- Wilson Cup

(gold) Champions (1): 2009

- Australian International Ice Hockey Cup

(silver) Runners-Up (3): 2009, 2010, 2011

== Players ==
=== Current roster ===
Team roster for the 2026 AIHL season

Central Coast Rhinos roster - 2026 AIHL season
Active roster		Inactive roster	Coaching staff
Goaltenders: 1 (Australia) Riley White; 29 (Canada) Anand Oberoi (I); 31 (Australia) Bryce Kitching; 33 (Canada) Sean Ellison; Defencemen: 4 (Canada) Brandon Mendham (I); 13 (Australia) Patrik Dittrich; 15 (Australia) Matthew Kopp; 20 (Australia) Robert Malloy (C); 23 (Australia) Henri Kohvakka; 27 (Australia) Stuart Cole-Clark; 43 (Australia) Patrick Ward; 55 (Australia) Robert Kowalczyk; 91 (Australia) Scott Dewar; -- (Australia) Joshua Kowalczyk	Forwards: 3 (Australia) Mackenzie Bolger; 8 (Australia) Jamie Blazevic; 10 (Australia) Cameron Hughes; 11 (South Korea) Sang Ho Bae (I); 14 (Australia) Nikolas Panayi; 16 (Australia) Tyler Kubara (A); 17 (Australia) Tanner Hamilton; 18 (Canada) Raphaël Bastille (I); 19 (Australia) Saxon Air; 22 (Australia) Aiden Downie; 27 (France) Bryan Sautereau (I); 48 (Australia) Timothy Rye; 73 (Australia) Sam Swyak; 75 (Australia) Gregory Chystyakov; 77 (Australia) Jacob Zyl; 78 (Canada) Sébastien Sylvestre (I); 83 (Canada) Danick Bouchard (A/I); 90 (Australia) Hayden Sayers	45 (Japan) Kanta Hashimoto (I); 86 (Canada) Alexandre Boivin (I); -- (Canada) Kesho Donald (I)	Head Coach: (Australia) Ron Kuprowsky; Coaches: (Australia) Derek Downie (AC); Legend (C) Captain (A) Alternate Captain (I) Import player Statistics; Average age: 26.50; Average height: 181.09 cm Average weight: 81.03 kg
Last updated on: 1 August 2026
Elite Prospects

=== Historic rosters ===
The 2008 team roster for the Rhinos, the last roster for the Rhinos in their first stint in the AIHL before the team withdrew from the league in 2009.

Central Coast Rhinos roster - 2008 AIHL season
Active roster		Coaching staff
Goaltenders: 80 (Australia) Alan Becken; 1 (Sweden) Markus Claesson (I); 1 (Australia) James Esson; -- (Australia) Chris Gleeson; -- (Australia) Andrew Waite; Defencemen: 8 (Australia) Steven Adams; -- (Australia) Shane Barrow; 19 (Australia) Robert Byrnes; 16 (Australia) Jayson Chalker; 17 (Australia) Stuart Cole-Clark; 24 (Australia) Ben Drew; 21 (Canada) Adrian Hartley (I); 42 (Australia) Jason Kvisle; 74 (Canada) Blair Nicholson (I); 84 (Finland) Riku Suntio (I)	Forwards: 4 (Australia) Brett Cole-Clark; 4 (Australia) Lucien Hackett; 99 (Canada) Kyle Klym (I); 11 (Sweden) Simon Kummu (I); -- (Australia) Clint Lucas; 71 (Sweden) Jörgen Omark (I); -- (Australia) Rhys Outred; 14 (Australia) Matthew Perry; 18 (Australia) Daniel Shaw; 98 (Australia) Beau Taylor; 9 (Australia) Mark Walsh (C); 74 (Australia) Alex Witts; 44 (Australia) Matthew Wrankmore	Head Coach: (Australia) Art Shaw; Coaches: (Australia) Jeff Taylor (AC); (Australia) Grahame Hill (TM); Legend (C) Captain (A) Alternate Captain (I) Import player Statistics; Average age: 21.9; Average height: 180.9 cm Average weight: 84.7 kg Win%: 25%
Last updated on: 16 April 2022
Elite Prospects

== Team staff ==
Current as of 2024 AIHL season.

Rhinos staff
Role	Name
Head coach	(Australia) Ron Kuprowsky
Assistant coach	(Canada) Justin Vienneau
Assistant coach	(South Africa) Ashley Marsh
Equipment manager	(Australia) Claire Collins
General manager	(Australia) Ellis Southee

== Leaders ==
=== Team captains ===
The Rhinos have had four captains in the team's AIHL history.

No.	Name	Term
1	(Australia) Matthew Pease	2005–06
2	(Australia) Peter White	2007
3	(Australia) Mark Walsh	2008
4	(Australia) Robert Malloy	2022–Present

=== Head coaches ===
The Rhinos have had five head coaches in the team's AIHL history.

No.	Name	Term
1	(Australia) Graham Homann	2005
2	(Australia) Dion Dunwoodie	2006
3	(Australia) Adam McGuinness	2007–08
4	(Australia) Art Shaw	2008–09
5	(South Africa) Ashley Marsh	2022–23
6	(Australia) Ron Kuprowsky	2024–Present

== Broadcasting ==
Current:

- AIHL.TV (2023-present) – Worldwide paid subscription-based online video broadcasting published by the AIHL in partnership with the Clutch.TV platform using local production companies at each team’s rink. The service went live in April 2023 and would cover every AIHL regular-season and finals game live and on demand.
- Sportradar (2023 - present) – International online video broadcasting in North America and Europe as part of a league-wide 3-year deal signed in March 2022 in the lead-up to the 2022 AIHL season.

Former:

- Kayo Sports (2022) – Domestic online video broadcasting in Australia as part of the league-wide deal struck in the lead-up to the 2022 AIHL season to show every AIHL game live.
