= 2000 AIHL season =

- League: Australian Ice Hockey League
- Sport: Ice hockey

Regular season
- Premiers: Sydney Bears (1st title)
- Top scorer: Paul Lawson (Avalanche)

Championship final
- Champions: Adelaide Avalanche
- Runners-up: Sydney Bears

AIHL seasons
- 2001 →

The 2000 AIHL season was the inaugural season of the Australian Ice Hockey League (AIHL), the first semi-pro national ice hockey league in Australian history. The Sydney Bears finished first after the regular season but lost the championship final to the Adelaide Avalanche 5–6 in a shootout. Paul Lawson of the Adelaide Avalanche top scored in the regular season.

== Regular season ==
The maiden regular season featured all three founding teams, Adelaide Avalanche, Canberra Knights and the Sydney Bears, playing in a round-robin format. The top two teams at the conclusion of the regular season would qualify to play a single head-to-head final.

Team	GP	W	T	L	GF	GA	GDF	PTS
Sydney Bears	Statistical information unavailable							
Adelaide Avalanche	Statistical information unavailable							
Canberra Knights	Statistical information unavailable							

Qualified for championship final	Premiership winners

== Final ==
Following the regular season the Avalanche and the Bears competed in the single game final held at Macquarie Ice Rink. Adelaide won the game 6–5 in a shootout after coming from two goals behind late in the third period to level the match in regulation time. The Bears controlled the match in the first two periods before a controversial five minute major penalty late in the game to the Bears saw Adelaide pull goaltender Eric Lien and score two power play goals.

2 September 2000	Adelaide Avalanche	6 – 5 (SO)	Sydney Bears	Macquarie Ice Rink

Game reference
