= 2005 AIHL season =

- League: Australian Ice Hockey League
- Sport: Ice hockey
- Duration: 16 April 2005 – 4 September 2005

Regular season
- V.I.P. Cup: Adelaide Avalanche (3rd title)
- Top scorer: Francis Walker (54 points) (North Stars)

Goodall Cup
- Champions: Newcastle North Stars
- Runners-up: Adelaide Avalanche

AIHL seasons
- ← 2004 2006 →

The 2005 AIHL season was the sixth season of the Australian Ice Hockey League (AIHL). It ran from 16 April 2005 until 28 August 2005, with the Goodall Cup finals following on 3 and 4 September 2005. The Adelaide Avalanche won the V.I.P. Cup after finishing the regular season first in the league standings. The Newcastle North Stars won the Goodall Cup for the second time by defeating the Adelaide Avalanche in the final.

== Regular season ==
The regular season began on 16 April 2005 and ran through to 28 August 2005 before the top four teams advanced to compete in the Goodall Cup playoff series.

=== Standings ===
Team	GP	W	T	OTW	OTL	L	GF	GA	GDF	PTS
Adelaide Avalanche	26	19	1	0	2	4	133	77	+56	60
Newcastle North Stars	26	14	2	1	4	5	113	77	+36	50
Western Sydney Ice Dogs	26	11	1	2	2	10	102	106	-4	40
Sydney Bears	26	11	0	2	1	12	93	94	-1	38
Canberra Knights	26	11	2	0	0	13	96	102	-6	35
Brisbane Blue Tongues	26	8	1	4	0	13	112	112	0	33
Melbourne Ice	26	9	0	2	2	13	112	116	-4	33
Central Coast Rhinos	26	4	1	2	2	17	69	146	-77	19

Qualified for the Goodall Cup playoffs	V.I.P. Cup winners

=== Statistics ===
==== Scoring leaders ====
List shows the ten top skaters sorted by points, then goals. Current as of 4 September 2005

Player	Team	GP	G	A	Pts	PIM	POS
Francis Walker	Newcastle North Stars	24	28	26	54	60	F
Donald Nichols	Newcastle North Stars	25	13	36	49	65	D
Darcy Corcoran	Adelaide Avalanche	23	23	24	47	50	F
Shaun Fairweather	Canberra Knights	21	23	23	46	22	F
Jordan Landry	Newcastle North Stars	24	21	21	42	160	RW
Michael Harrow	Canberra Knights	26	10	31	41	50	F
Greg Oddy	Adelaide Avalanche	23	16	23	39	50	F
Nolan Graham	Newcastle North Stars	15	22	22	37	16	LW
Lliam Webster	Melbourne Ice	21	14	22	36	32	F
Robert Starke	Newcastle North Stars	26	9	27	36	86	D

==== Leading goaltenders ====
Only the top five goaltenders, based on save percentage with a minimum 40% of the team's ice time. Current as of 4 September 2005

Player	Team	MIP	SOG	GA	GAA	SVS%	SO
Matthew Ezzy	Newcastle North Stars	1128	747	71	3.15	0.925	2
Eric Lien	Adelaide Avalanche	777	449	55	3.54	0.878	1
David Wong	Central Coast Rhinos	1084	891	120	5.54	0.865	0
Dylan Smart	Canberra Knights	1035	603	84	4.06	0.861	0
Nigel Ward	Adelaide Avalanche	425	212	30	3.53	0.858	0

== Goodall Cup playoffs ==
The 2005 playoffs was scheduled for 3 September with the Goodall Cup final held on 4 September 2005. Following the end of the regular season the top four teams advanced to the playoff series which was held at the Hunter Ice Skating Stadium in Newcastle, New South Wales. The series was a single game elimination with the two winning semi-finalists advancing to the Goodall Cup final. The Goodall Cup was won by Newcastle North Stars (2nd title) who defeated the Adelaide Avalanche 3–1 in the final. Newcastle's goaltender Matt Ezzy was awarded the grand final game puck post-game by coaching director Rob Barnes for his display in the final and throughout the season despite having a shoulder injury that would require surgery post-season. In a first for the league and ice hockey in Australia, the 2005 Finals was broadcast live on the internet via webcam with live instant text play-by-play provided by Peter Lambert. Over 110,000 hits were registered over the Finals weekend with supports watching from as far away as North America.

Semifinals
1	Sydney Bears	3
4	Adelaide Avalanche	6
3	Western Sydney Ice Dogs	2
2	Newcastle North Stars	5

Final
Newcastle North Stars	3
Adelaide Avalanche	1

All times are UTC+10:00

=== Semi-finals ===
3 September 2005; 16:30	Sydney Bears	3–6 (2–1, 1–4, 0–1)	Adelaide Avalanche	Hunter Ice Skating Stadium; Attendance: 800

Game reference

Peter Haywood
Goalies
Eric Lien
Referee:
Rob Duchemin
Linesmen:
Chris Mason
Jamie Miller

Di Piazza (Stransky, Kinateder)	1 – 0
	1 – 1	Brlecic (Oddy, Martin)
Jayawardene (Di Piazza, Petr)	2 – 1
	2 – 2	Keane (Delsar, Martini)
	2 – 3	Oddy (PP) (Corcoran, Lien)
	2 – 4	Thilthorpe (Oddy, McKenna)
Stransky (Nelson-Bond, Kinateder)	3 – 4
	3 – 5	Corcoran (SH)(Oddy)
	3 – 6	Oddy (Walsh)

14 min
Penalties
6 min
19
Shots
25

3 September 2005; 18:00	Western Sydney Ice Dogs	2–5 (2–0, 2–1, 2–2)	Newcastle North Stars	Hunter Ice Skating Stadium

Game reference

Christian Fritz
Goalies
Matthew Ezzy
Referee:
Jeff Scott
Linesmen:
Jason Forbes
Matthew Taylor

	0 – 1	Foll (PP) (Byrne, LaJeunesse)
Haakstad (Wilson, Gailloux)	1 – 1
	1 – 2	Ogilvie (Sheffield, Walker)
Gailloux (unassisted)	2 – 2
	2 – 3	Sheffield (LaJeunesse, Starke)
	2 – 4	Nichols (PP) (Starke, Landry)
	2 – 5	Walker (Nichols, Starke)

42 min
Penalties
14 min
31
Shots
29

=== Final ===
4 September 2005; 17:00	Newcastle North Stars	3–1 (1–0, 2–1, 0–0)	Adelaide Avalanche	Hunter Ice Skating Stadium

Game reference

Matthew Ezzy
Goalies
Eric Lien
Referee:
Rob Duchemin
Linesmen:
Jamie Miller
Chris Mason

Nichols (LaJeunesse)	1 – 0
	1 – 1	Shultz (Keane, Delsar)
Ogilvie (Sheffield, Nichols)	2 – 1
Landry (Walker, Starke)	3 – 1

10 min
Penalties
37 min
35
Shots
32
