= 2001 AIHL season =

- League: Australian Ice Hockey League
- Sport: Ice hockey

Regular season
- Premiers: Adelaide Avalanche (1st title)
- Top scorer: Paul Lawson (38 points) (Avalanche)

Playoffs
- Champions: Adelaide Avalanche
- Runners-up: Sydney Bears

AIHL seasons
- ← 2000 2002 →

The 2001 AIHL season is the second season of the Australian Ice Hockey League (AIHL). The Adelaide Avalanche finished first after the regular season and also won the championship final, defeating the Sydney Bears 10–7. Paul Lawson of the Adelaide Avalanche top scored for the regular season with 38 points.

== Regular season ==
The regular season featured the three teams in the league playing 16 games each. At the end of the season Adelaide Avalanche finished on top of the regular season standings with 31 points and the Sydney Bears finishing second with 15 points. Both teams advanced to the championship final to compete in a single game playoff. Paul Lawson of the Adelaide Avalanche was the league's top scorer, scoring 16 goals and 22 assists for a total of 38 points.

Team	GP	W	T	L	GF	GA	GDF	PTS
Adelaide Avalanche	16	15	1	0	120	60	+60	31
Sydney Bears	16	7	1	8	70	74	–4	15
Canberra Knights	16	1	0	15	53	109	–56	2

Qualified for the Goodall Cup final	Premiership winners

== Goodall Cup Final ==
Following the regular season the Avalanche and the Bears competed in the single game final held on Saturday 1 September 2001 at the Thebarton Snowdome in Adelaide at 4:14pm.

Adelaide entered the grand final match as favourites on the back of an undefeated regular season, where the South Australians posted a 17 wins, 1 tie and 0 losses record. The Bears were however confident themselves with the returning leadership team of Tyler Lovering and Vladimir Rubes for the grand final. In the first period the Avalanche opened the scoring through Trevor Walsh. Walsh doubled the home team's score before Paul and Charlie Lawson cemented Adelaide's lead. The Bears pulled a goal back on the power play to end the first period 1–4 down. In the second period, the Avalanche continued to score at will and found themselves 7–1 up before the Bears began their fightback off the back of Adelaide getting into penalty trouble. The Bears punished the Avalanche on the power play with three unanswered power play goals. Sydney then scored a fifth goal before the end of the period and Adelaide's lead was cut to two goals. At the second break the Avalanche led the game 7–5. Adelaide's top goal scorer, Trevor Walsh, succumbed to a shoulder injury early in the third period and missed the remainder of the grand final. Momentum shifted from the home team to the visiting Bears in the third period and while they continued to score goals the Avalanche kept trading goals with them. With two minutes remaining in the game, Ben Thilthorpe sealed the Adelaide victory with the final goal. The Avalanche won the game 10–7, becoming the 2001 AIHL champions and securing back-to-back AIHL championships.

1 September 2001; 16:14	Adelaide Avalanche	10–7 (4–1, 3–4, 3–2)	Sydney Bears	Thebarton Snowdome (Adelaide); Attendance: Sell out

Game reference
Eric Lien	Goalies
Ben Thilthorpe (2); Trevor Walsh (2); Paul Lawson; Charlie Lawson; Chris Brlecic; Glen Foll; Thomas Mikkelsen; John Oddy / Goals
30 min	Penalties	30 min
54	Shots	43
