= 2007 AIHL season =

- League: Australian Ice Hockey League
- Sport: Ice hockey
- Duration: 14 April 2007 – 2 September 2007

Regular season
- V.I.P. Cup: Adelaide Avalanche (4th title)
- Season MVP: Tommy Powell (Ice)
- Top scorer: Brad Wanchulak (69 points) (North Stars)

Goodall Cup
- Champions: The Bears
- Runners-up: Newcastle North Stars
- Finals MVP: Pekka Kankaanranta (The Bears)

AIHL seasons
- 2006 2008

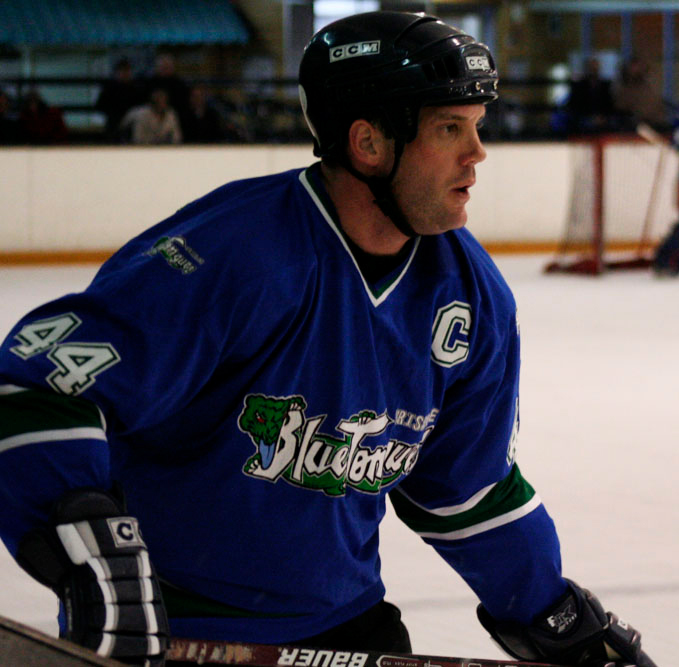
Don Burke (#44) playing for the Brisbane Blue Tongues during the 2007 AIHL season.

The 2007 AIHL season was the eighth season of the Australian Ice Hockey League (AIHL). It ran from 14 April 2007 until 26 August 2007, with the Goodall Cup finals following on 1 and 2 September 2007. The Adelaide Avalanche won the V.I.P. Cup after finishing the regular season first in the league standings. The Bears won the Goodall Cup for the second time by defeating the Newcastle North Stars in the final.

== Regular season ==
The regular season began on 14 April 2007 and ran through to 26 August 2007 before the top four teams advanced to compete in the Goodall Cup playoff series.

=== Standings ===
Team	GP	W	SOW	SOL	L	GF	GA	GDF	PTS
Adelaide Avalanche	28	17	1	3	7	124	99	+25	56
Melbourne Ice	28	14	4	3	7	111	84	+27	53
Newcastle North Stars	28	13	5	4	6	117	96	+21	53
The Bears	28	14	4	2	7	113	87	+26	49 (Note: The Bears, Western Sydney Ice Dogs and Brisbane Blue Tongues were each penalised 3 competition points. The three teams all iced players that had not been officially cleared to play by the IIHF and IHA.)
Brisbane Blue Tongues	28	15	0	4	8	126	111	+15	46
Western Sydney Ice Dogs	28	10	7	1	9	113	99	+14	42
Canberra Knights	28	6	0	2	20	87	132	-45	20
Central Coast Rhinos	28	2	0	2	24	80	163	-83	8

Qualified for the Goodall Cup playoffs	V.I.P. Cup winners

Notes:

=== Statistics ===
==== Scoring leaders ====
List shows the ten top skaters sorted by points, then goals. Current as of 2 September 2007

Player	Team	GP	G	A	Pts	PIM	POS
Brad Wanchulak	Newcastle North Stars	23	31	38	69	26	F
Matt Amado	Brisbane Blue Tongues	20	39	23	62	56	F
Tomas Landa	The Bears	25	20	42	62	49	F
Greg Oddy	Adelaide Avalanche	20	24	19	43	109	F
Ryan Remillard	Adelaide Avalanche	23	22	20	42	24	F
Vladimir Rubes	The Bears	24	15	26	41	34	F
Håkan Olsson	Central Coast Rhinos	22	11	27	38	28	C
Brian Ballman	Adelaide Avalanche	21	17	20	37	40	LW
Robert Starke	Newcastle North Stars	26	7	28	35	67	D
Thomas Powell	Melbourne Ice	23	16	18	34	4	F

==== Leading goaltenders ====
Only the top five goaltenders, based on save percentage with a minimum 40% of the team's ice time. Current as of 2 September 2007

Player	Team	MIP	SOG	GA	GAA	SVS%	SO
Matthew Ezzy	Newcastle North Stars	992	674	69	3.48	0.898	3
Lanny Ramage	Western Sydney Ice Dogs	681	431	46	3.38	0.893	0
Pekka Kankaanranta	The Bears	1103	584	69	3.13	0.882	2
Olivier Martin	Adelaide Avalanche	994	594	70	3.52	0.882	1
Stuart Denman	Melbourne Ice	1039	536	66	3.18	0.877	1

=== Notes ===
- The Newcastle North Stars vs Canberra Knights game scheduled for 10 June was postponed by six weeks, due to power cuts caused by wild storms.
- The Adelaide Avalanche set an impressive record on 1 July against West Sydney, scoring four goals (all even-strength) in just thirty-four seconds; the comparable record in the NHL is eighty seconds, and is over sixty years old.
- The inaugural MVP award was presented to Tommy Powell of the Melbourne Ice. While Powell ranked only tenth amongst scorers (23 games, 16 goals, 18 assists), he dominated Melbourne's attack during the first half of the season, when they were at their most successful.

== Goodall Cup playoffs ==
The 2007 playoffs was scheduled for 1 September with the Goodall Cup final held on 2 September 2007. Following the end of the regular season the top four teams advanced to the playoff series which was held at the Penrith Ice Palace in Penrith, New South Wales. The series was a single game elimination with the two winning semi-finalists advancing to the Goodall Cup final. The Goodall Cup was won by The Bears (2nd title) who defeated the Newcastle North Stars 3–2 in overtime after the two teams finished regulation time locked at 2–2. Bear's goaltender, Pekka Kankaanranta, was named the finals most valuable player (MVP).

Semifinals
1	The Bears	4
4	Adelaide Avalanche	1
3	Newcastle North Stars	6
2	Melbourne Ice	3

Final
The Bears	3
Newcastle North Stars	2

All times are UTC+10:00

=== Semi-finals ===
1 September 2007; 16:00	The Bears	4–1 (2–0, 0–0, 2–1)	Adelaide Avalanche	Penrith Ice Palace

Game reference

Pekka Kankaanranta
Goalies
Olivier Martin
Referee:
Rob Duchemin
Linesmen:
Tim Bell
Gordon Young

Schlamp (Lovering, Rubes)	1 – 0
Jayawardene (unassisted)	2 – 0
	2 – 1	Ballman (SH) (Ryan Remillard)
Jayawardene (PP) (unassisted)	3 – 1
Rubes (Schlamp)	4 – 1

26 min
Penalties
37 min
25
Shots
29

1 September 2007; 19:00	Newcastle North Stars	6–3 (2–0, 2–1, 2–2)	Melbourne Ice	Penrith Ice Palace

Game reference

Matthew Ezzy
Goalies
Stuart Denman
Referee:
David Ast
Linesmen:
Ivan Manco
Tomas Zavisky

Corcoran (Wanchulak, Starke)	1 – 0
Corcoran (SH) (Wanchulak, Starke)	2 – 0
Corcoran (Smith, Hawkins)	3 – 0
Corcoran (SH) (Wanchulak, Ezzy)	4 – 0
	4 – 1	Webster (PP) (Abrams, Matus)
Wanchulak (PP) (Corcoran, McKenna)	5 – 1
	5 – 2	V.Hughes (Hardy, Street)
Corcoran (PP) (McKenna, Hawkins)	6 – 2
	6 – 3	Webster (unassisted)

10 min
Penalties
33 min
23
Shots
32

=== Final ===
2 September 2007; 16:00	The Bears	3–2 (OT) (0–0, 1–0, 1–2, 1–0)	Newcastle North Stars	Penrith Ice Palace

Game reference

Pekka Kankaanranta
Goalies
Matthew Ezzy
Referee:
David Ast
Linesmen:
Ivan Manco
Tomas Zavisky

Rubes (Schlamp)	1 – 0
Jayawardene (Sonter, Nelson-Bond)	2 – 0
	2 – 1	Wanchulak (Starke, Smith)
	2 – 2	Corcoran (PP) (Starke, Wanchulak)
Pasminka (PP) (Rubes, Schlamp)	3 – 2

14 min
Penalties
16 min
27
Shots
17
