= Canberra Knights =

- City: Phillip, Australian Capital Territory
- League: Australian Ice Hockey League; East Coast Super League; NSW Superleague
- Founded: 1981
- Operated: 1981–2014
- Home arena: Phillip Ice Skating Centre
- Colours: Teal, Black, Silver and White

Championships
- ECSL Championships: 1 (1998)

The Canberra Knights were a semi-professional ice hockey team in the Australian Ice Hockey League (AIHL). The team played its home games at the Phillip Swimming & Ice Skating Centre in Phillip, a suburb of Australia's capital city, Canberra. In February 2014 the team owner announced that operations would fold due to financial costs, lack of local players and poor performance. They were replaced in the league by the CBR Brave. The Knights were only ever premiers once, in 1998, in the now defunct East Coast Super League, and never made the finals since the formation of the AIHL.

== History ==
=== 1980–1993 ===
The Phillip Ice Skating and Swimming centre opened in 1980, and in 1981 the Canberra Knights were formed by a group of former hockey players, many who had not played in years, and they played in various exhibition matches against international and Australian teams. In 1982, the Knights were a founding member of the New South Wales Superleague, which was a Sydney-based competition, taking on some of the best teams in Australia. In this first year, the Knights were coached by Stuart Wright and although it was unsuccessful for the Canberra Knights, they gained invaluable experience.

In 1983, the Canberra Knights were again entered into the NSW Superleague. Chuck Naish and Jim Fuyarchuk, formerly of the Macquarie Bears and the now defunct Warringah Bombers respectively, had been brought in as player/coaches. This was a big year and the combined talents soon became evident as the Canberra Knights proved they were a winning team. Ably assisted by some promising young players and the proven skills of the imported players, the Canberra Knights finished a close second to the Warringah Bombers in the playoffs.

1984 continued with the same team line-up, with the addition of two players, Dean Pollock (from the Macquarie Bears), and Canadian import Bill Rose.

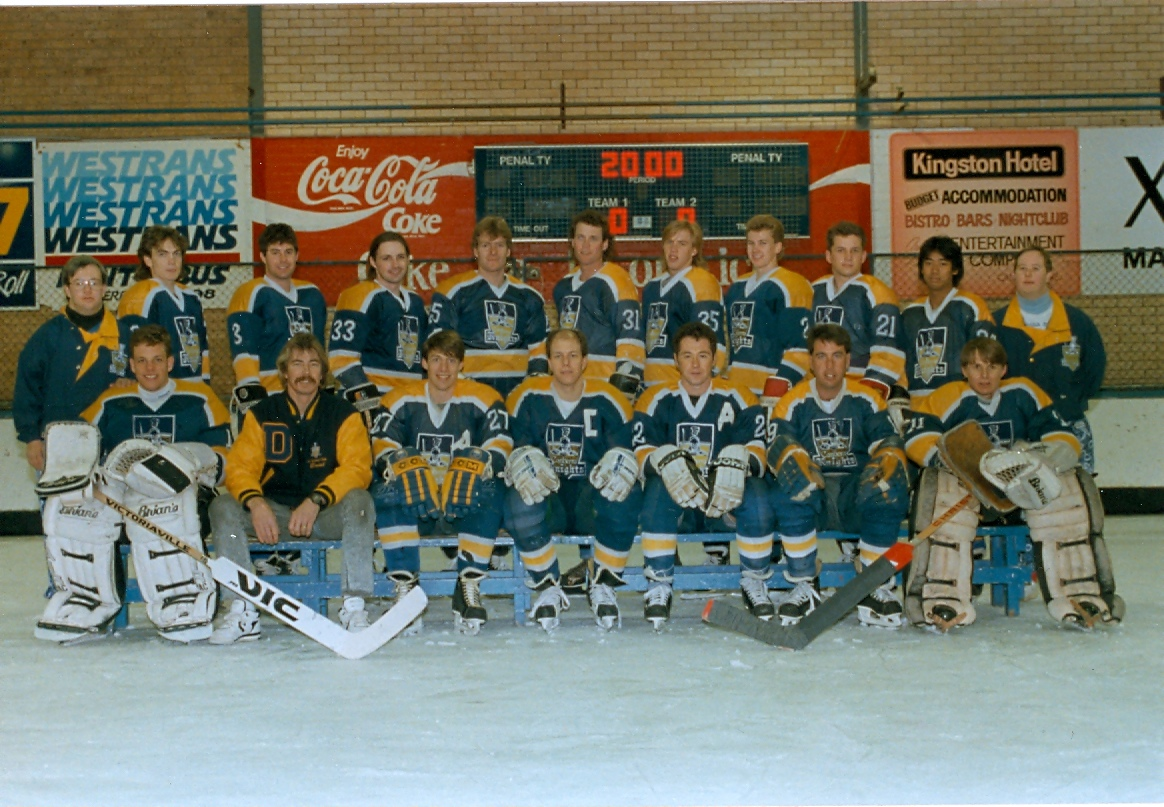
1992 Canberra Knights

The 1992 Knights featured Jason Elliott, a 16-year-old Canadian goalie who migrated to Australia with his parents a year before. Jason, after representing Australia internationally in both senior and junior categories would later return to Canada to play Junior A Tier II hockey with Kimberley of the RMJHL. Jason was drafted by the Detroit Red Wings 205th overall in 1994 directly from the RMJHL, and then went on to star for Cornell in NCAA Division 1 hockey. After a brief stint with Detroit in 2002 where Jason was third string goalie in the Red Wing's Stanley Cup victory, Jason went on to a long minor league career in both the US and Europe before retiring following the 2006–07 season.

Mike Harrow, Canberra Knights head coach 2007–2008

=== 1994–1999 ===
While lasting for thirteen seasons, the NSW Superleague struggled to gain stability and could not continue. The league was reborn in 1994, as the East Coast Super League (ECSL). It continued with the same number of teams but was still largely based in the NSW area. Canberra's maiden ECSL championship came in 1998 when they won the premiership for the first time ever. The East Coast Super League has since been reformed as a junior (under 23) competition which serves as a bridge between local league hockey and the national level.

=== 2000–2007 ===
The Canberra Knights, along with the Sydney Bears and Adelaide Avalanche, founded the AIHL as a three-team competition following the disbanding of the ECSL in 2000. 2002 saw the introduction of the Melbourne Ice, the Newcastle Northstars and the West Sydney Ice Dogs, increasing the number of teams in the league to 6. The team finished just above the Melbourne Ice in fifth place, ending the season with 12 points and a fourth placed goaltender, Brad Hunt. In 2003 David Lewis, and import Saku Martakainen were both top scorers, but the Knights did not perform very well, ending the season in last place, not winning a single game. Since a playoff format was introduced to the AIHL in 2003 (prior to this, minor premiers were champions), the Knights have not made the postseason.

In 2005, with new imports, such as Canadian goaltender Dylan Smart, the Knights were able to enter the 5th AIHL season stronger than ever, and nearly made the play-offs. With two new teams joining the league, the Brisbane Blue Tongues and Central Coast Rhinos, the Knights were one of the stronger and more stable teams of the league, winning 11 of 24 games and finishing in fifth place with 35 points. Coached by former player Laing Harrow, 2005 has been the strongest Canberra Knights AIHL season ever.

Canberra Knights 2006 team

In 2006 the Knights acquired Finnish player/coach Tommi Suutari, and they began the season relatively strong, winning a few games, but failed to continue this streak and ended up losing 25 out of 28 regular season games, one of the wins being a miraculous triumph over the Sydney Bears later in the season, finishing them off in a shoot-out at their home venue in Phillip. Despite this the Knights still finished in last place. This was also the season where an Australian ice hockey record was set, when Canberra lost 21–2 in a game against the Newcastle Northstars.

The Knights lost head coach Tommi Suutari prior to the commencement of the 2007 season, as he had to return to Finland. Mike Harrow, who also played forward for the club, was appointed as head coach. Goaltenders were also changed, as Luke Fiveash became the Canberra Knights primary goalie, with Brad Hunt as a secondary. This season also saw the addition of Finnish imports Ari-Pekka Hakala, who went on to become the second highest scorer for the season, and Antti Teisala. During previous seasons the Knights were notorious for having very outdated and old away jerseys, but halfway through the season there was a redesign, with the introduction of their current away jerseys.

The team won their opening game of the 2007 season against the Brisbane Blue Tongues, but did not follow up their performance, losing the next 3 games. On Saturday 5 May the Knights had a compelling 5–3 win against a strong West Sydney side. Since this win, the Knights only won four more games, including 9 June against the Central Coast Rhinos, defeating them 7–0. 2007 saw the Knights only winning two away games, including their last match of the season, against the Brisbane Blue Tongues, which eliminated them from the playoffs. The season also saw the exit of two veteran Knights players, long time goalie Brad Hunt, and Mike Harrow who served the team for many years in various roles, as coach and captain. The Canberra Knights finished the 2007 season on 20 points, in seventh place.

=== 2008-2014 ===
With the loss of Brad Hunt and Mike Harrow, the 2008 season will open the doors to new imports and junior players moving up to the AIHL. With goal tender Nick Eckhardt will getting more ice time with the team, and the likely return of Finnish imports Hakala and Teisala, the Canberra Knights are set to be a strong team in the 2008 AIHL season. On 26 February 2014 club owner John Raut announced that the team have folded operations effective immediately and would not be competing in the upcoming 2014 AIHL season. Raut cited financial costs, lack of local players and poor performance as the reasons behind the move. The following day it was announced that the player group headed by captain Mark Rummukainen have approached the AIHL with plans on taking on the club's licence. The following month the league announced that the Knights had been replaced in the league by the CBR Brave. Knights owner, John Raut, will keep possession of the Knights brand and has suggested reviving the team in the future to play in the East Coast Super League.

== Championships ==
- East Coast Superleague

Champions (1): 1998

- NSW Superleague

Champions (0):
Runners-Up (1): 1983

== Team Colours ==
Canberra Knights Alternative Logo found on away jerseys

=== Logo ===
The Canberra Knights logo shows a teal-coloured Knight wielding a hockey stick. Behind him is a silver shield, with the words Canberra Knights below him, and the entire logo is outlined in white. Prior to the 2005 season, the Knights had a logo which is now used on the away jerseys. It is simply a picture of a puck, with the words "Canberra Knights" printed across the front.

=== Jerseys ===
The team's colours are teal, silver, black and white. The home jerseys for the Canberra Knights are black, and have the logo on the front, with the old logo on the shoulder, with white numbers and names. They are based on the San Jose Sharks alternate jerseys. The away jerseys are white and have the old logo on the front, with the new logo on the shoulder, and have black numbers and names. Prior to the 2005 season the Knights wore teal-coloured jerseys, with the old logo on the front, and white numbers and names.

== Season-by-season record ==
1992 Canberra Knights – Steven Woods (A), Jason Elliot (G) and Al McLean

Champions	Runners-up	Third Place

Canberra Knights all-time AIHL record
Season	Regular season											Finals weekend								Top points scorer	
Season	P	W	T^{1}	L	SW	SL	GF	GA	GD	Pts	Finish	P	W	L	GF	GA	Result	Semi-final	Goodall Cup final	Name	Points
2000	Information not available																			Information not available	
2001	16	1	0	15	–	–	53	109	-56	2	3rd	–								Information not available	
2002	20	8	0	12	–	–	60	82	-22	16	5th	–								(Australia) Matt Lehoczky	15
2003	8	0	0	8	–	–	16	64	-48	0	6th	–								(Finland) Saku Martikainen	7
2004	20	3	1	14	2	0	53	109	-56	14	6th	–								(Canada) Matt Rowe	19
2005	26	11	2	13	0	0	96	102	-6	35	5th	–								(Canada) Shaun Fairweather	46
2006	28	3	–	24	1	0	74	185	-111	11	8th	–								(Finland) Arto Roimola	35
2007	28	6	–	20	0	2	84	124	-40	20	7th	–								(Australia) Michael Harrow	34
2008	28	10	–	15	1	2	91	107	-16	34	5th	–								(Finland) Marko Raita	42
2009	24	4	–	18	1	1	60	120	-60	15	6th	–								(Finland) Marko Raita	25
2010	24	5	–	16	0	3	79	131	-52	18	6th	–								(United States) Sean Scarbrough	41
2011	28	8	–	20	0	0	119	167	-48	24	7th	–								(United States) Addison DeBoer	85
2012	24	4	–	14	4	2	73	116	-43	22	4th, Bauer	–								(United States) Nic Polaski	32
2013	28	2	–	25	0	1	51	181	-130	7	8th	–								(Canada) Jordan Braid	26

^{1} As of the 2006 AIHL season, all games have a winner.

== Players and personnel ==
=== Team captains ===
Mark Persick, former Canberra Knights captain

- Laing Harrow, 1991–92
- David Batho, 2000
- Mike Harrow, 2004–06
- Mark Persick, 2007
- Mark Rummukainen, 2011
- Mark Rummukainen & Aaron Clayworth, 2012
- Mark Rummukainen, 2013–14

=== Head coaches ===
- Stuart Wright, 1982
- Chuck Naish & Jim Fuyarchuk, 1983–85
- Darin Vetterl, 1993–95
- Brad Hunt, 2003
- Laing Harrow, 2004–05
- Tommi Suutari, 2006
- Mike Harrow, 2007–08
- Stuart Philps, 2009
- David Rogina, 2010–11
- Donald McDonald & Bear McPhail, 2012
- Matti Luoma, 2013–14

==== Players ====
- Most goals in a season: Shaun Fairweather, 24 (2005)
- Most assists in a season: Mike Harrow, 31 (2005)
- Most points in a season: Shaun Fairweather, 46 (2005)
- Most Penalty Minutes in a season: Trevor Ross, 189 (2005)

==== Team ====
- Most points in a season: 35 (2005)
- Most wins in a season: 11 (2005)
