= 2002 AIHL season =

- League: Australian Ice Hockey League
- Sport: Ice hockey

Regular season
- Premiers: Sydney Bears (1st title)
- Top scorer: Greg Oddy (39 points) (Avalanche)

Goodall Cup
- Champions: Sydney Bears
- Runners-up: Adelaide Avalanche

AIHL seasons
- 2001 2003

The 2002 AIHL season was the third season of the Australian Ice Hockey League (AIHL). The Sydney Bears completed the double by winning the league premiership by finishing top of the league standings and claiming the Goodall Cup after defeating Adelaide Avalanche in the AIHL final.

== League business ==
The 2002 season saw the league expand from three teams to six with the introduction of the Melbourne Ice, Newcastle North Stars, and the West Sydney Ice Dogs. The league also secured the Goodall Cup as the trophy for the AIHL final victor for the first time (winners in 2000 and 2001 were backdated).

== Regular season ==
Team	GP	W	T	RT	L	GF	GA	GDF	PTS
Sydney Bears	16	12	1	1	2	90	54	36	25
Adelaide Avalanche	16	11	0	0	5	90	50	40	22
West Sydney Ice Dogs	16	8	1	1	6	54	48	6	17
Newcastle North Stars	16	6	0	1	10	56	95	-39	13
Canberra Knights	16	6	0	0	10	42	63	-21	12
Melbourne Ice	16	2	0	0	14	30	54	-24	4

Qualified for the Goodall Cup final	Premiership winners

== Goodall Cup playoffs ==
The playoffs were held at Sydney's Blacktown Ice Arena. The Sydney Bears defeated the Adelaide Avalanche in the final to win the Goodall Cup. The Bears were the first team to win the Goodall Cup in the AIHL after it was transferred from the inter-state tournament.

24 August 2002; 16:15	Sydney Bears	5 – 4 (SO)	Adelaide Avalanche	Blacktown Ice Arena

Game reference

== Statistics ==
=== Scoring leaders ===
List shows the ten top skaters sorted by points, then goals.

Player	Team	GP	G	A	Pts	PIM	POS
Greg Oddy	Adelaide Avalanche	15	18	21	39	47	F
Brett Hillier	Newcastle North Stars	14	22	12	34	22	F
Thomas Mikkelsen	Adelaide Avalanche	12	9	20	29	26	D
Murray Wand	Sydney Bears	15	16	11	27	14	F
Michael Schlamp	Newcastle North Stars	14	7	19	26	40	F
Branislav Kronika	West Sydney Ice Dogs	12	8	17	25	10	F
Ray Sheffield	Newcastle North Stars	13	11	14	25	4	F
Jarrko Turtainen	Sydney Bears	15	8	17	25	20	F
Martin Jesko	West Sydney Ice Dogs	11	12	12	24	2	F
Vladimir Rubes	Sydney Bears	13	10	13	23	37	F

=== Leading goaltenders ===
Only the top five goaltenders, based on save percentage.

Player	Team	MIP	SOG	GA	GAA	SVS%	SO
Bill Benedictson	Adelaide Avalanche	180:00	114	10	2.50	91.23	0
Harri Kohvakka	Sydney Bears	315:00	185	22	3.14	88.11	0
Allan Mitchell	West Sydney Ice Dogs	483:14	322	40	3.73	87.58	1
Brad Hunt	Canberra Knights	240:00	176	23	4.31	86.93	0
Eric Lien	Adelaide Avalanche	450:00	282	40	4.00	85.82	1
