= 2006 AIHL season =

- League: Australian Ice Hockey League
- Sport: Ice hockey
- Duration: 8 April 2006 – 3 September 2006

Regular season
- V.I.P. Cup: Melbourne Ice (1st title)
- Top scorer: Marcel Kars (66 points) (North Stars)

Goodall Cup
- Champions: Newcastle North Stars
- Runners-up: Adelaide Avalanche

AIHL seasons
- ← 2005 2007 →

The 2006 AIHL season was the seventh season of the Australian Ice Hockey League (AIHL). It ran from 8 April 2006 until 27 August 2006, with the Goodall Cup finals following on 2 and 3 September 2006. The Melbourne Ice won the V.I.P. Cup after finishing the regular season first in the league standings. The Newcastle North Stars won the Goodall Cup for the third time by defeating the Adelaide Avalanche in the final.

== Regular season ==
The regular season began on 8 April 2006 and ran through to 27 August 2006 before the top four teams advanced to compete in the Goodall Cup playoff series.

=== Standings ===
Team	GP	W	SOW	SOL	L	GF	GA	GDF	PTS
Melbourne Ice	28	21	0	2	5	138	87	+51	65
Adelaide Avalanche	28	19	0	0	9	134	84	+50	57
Western Sydney Ice Dogs	28	18	1	0	9	101	84	+17	56
Newcastle North Stars	28	16	0	1	11	143	95	+48	49
Sydney Bears	28	15	1	1	11	145	112	+33	48
Brisbane Blue Tongues	28	10	1	0	17	129	138	-9	32
Central Coast Rhinos	28	6	0	0	22	97	169	-72	18
Canberra Knights	28	3	1	0	24	79	197	-118	11

Qualified for the Goodall Cup playoffs	V.I.P. Cup winners

=== Statistics ===
==== Scoring leaders ====
List shows the ten top skaters sorted by points, then goals. Current as of 3 September 2006

Player	Team	GP	G	A	Pts	PIM	POS
Marcel Kars	Newcastle North Stars	20	29	37	66	40	C
Jesse Pyatt	Newcastle North Stars	21	32	31	63	34	C
Vladan Stransky	Sydney Bears	24	27	30	57	50	F
Jean-Philippe Brière	Brisbane Blue Tongues	22	28	26	54	36	C
Vladimir Rubes	Sydney Bears	25	20	34	54	48	F
Brad Wanchulak	Adelaide Avalanche	23	26	27	53	12	F
Greg Oddy	Adelaide Avalanche	23	17	33	50	68	C
Mitch Strang	Central Coast Rhinos	25	22	22	44	56	LW
Trevor Sherban	Newcastle North Stars	25	11	31	42	95	D
Andy Luhovy	Sydney Bears	22	14	23	37	48	F

==== Leading goaltenders ====
Only the top five goaltenders, based on save percentage with a minimum 40% of the team's ice time. Current as of 3 September 2006

Player	Team	MIP	SOG	GA	GAA	SVS%	SO
Matthew Ezzy	Newcastle North Stars	989	722	69	3.49	0.904	1
D'arcy Munro	Western Sydney Ice Dogs	1035	621	66	3.19	0.894	2
Michael Clements	Sydney Bears	487	320	35	3.59	0.891	0
Stuart Denman	Melbourne Ice	989	526	65	3.29	0.876	1
Nigel Ward	Adelaide Avalanche	988	504	64	3.24	0.873	1

== Goodall Cup playoffs ==
The 2006 playoffs was scheduled for 2 September with the Goodall Cup final held on 3 September 2006. Following the end of the regular season the top four teams advanced to the playoff series which was held at the IceArenA in Adelaide, South Australia. The series was a single game elimination with the two winning semi-finalists advancing to the Goodall Cup final. The Goodall Cup was won by Newcastle North Stars (3rd title) who defeated host team the Adelaide Avalanche 4–0 in the final.

Semifinals
1	Newcastle North Stars	6
4	Melbourne Ice	1
3	Western Sydney Ice Dogs	2
2	Adelaide Avalanche	5

Final
Newcastle North Stars	4
Adelaide Avalanche	0

All times are UTC+10:00

=== Semi-finals ===
2 September 2006; 16:30	Newcastle North Stars	6–1 (2–0, 2–1, 2–0)	Melbourne Ice	IceArenA

Game reference

Matthew Ezzy
Goalies
Stuart Denman
Referee:
Jamie Miller
Linesmen:
David Ast
Mike Gainer

Kars (PP) (Zinck Spencer)	1 – 0
Kars (PP) (Zinck)	2 – 0
	2 – 1	Webster (Pitre)
Starke (PP) (unassisted)	3 – 1
Sheffield (PP) (Sherban, Zinck)	4 – 1
Sheffield (PP) (Zinck, Kars)	5 – 1
Kars (PP) (Sherban, Zinck)	6 – 1

22 min
Penalties
20 min
24
Shots
28

2 September 2006; 17:30	Western Sydney Ice Dogs	2–5 (2–0, 2–1, 2–2)	Adelaide Avalanche	IceArenA

Game reference

D'arcy Munro
Goalies
Nigel Ward
Referee:
Jeff Scott
Linesmen:
Chris Mason
Daryl Hamilton

Tobin (Symonds, Jasicki)	1 – 0
	1 – 1	Wanchulak (PP) (Nieminen, Walsh)
	1 – 2	Oddy (Walsh)
Kuzyk (PP) (unassisted)	2 – 2
	2 – 3	Nieminen (unassisted)
	2 – 4	Wanchulak (Oddy, Walsh)
	2 – 5	Walsh (EN) (unassisted)

22 min
Penalties
12 min
19
Shots
34

=== Final ===
3 September 2006; 17:00	Newcastle North Stars	4–0 (0–0, 1–0, 3–0)	Adelaide Avalanche	IceArenA

Game reference

Matthew Ezzy
Goalies
Nigel Ward
Referee:
Jamie Miller
Linesmen:
Chris Mason
Daryl Hamilton

Sherban (Kars, Crane)	1 – 0
Zinck (PP) (Kars)	2 – 0
Sheffield (Minson)	3 – 0
Sherban (PP) (Zinck, Kars)	4 – 0

16 min
Penalties
18 min
25
Shots
23
