= Gold Coast Blue Tongues =

- City: Bundall, Gold Coast, Queensland
- League: Australian Ice Hockey League
- Founded: 2005 (21 years ago)
- Operated: 2005–2015
- Dissolved: 2015 (11 years ago)
- Home arena: Iceland Bundall
- Colours: Green, blue and white
- General manager: (Australia) Dave Emblem
- Head coach: (Australia) Peter Nixon
- Captain: (Australia) Adam Geric
- Website: Bluetongues.com.au

Franchise history
- 2005–2007: Brisbane Blue Tongues
- 2008–2015: Gold Coast Blue Tongues

Championships
- Conference titles: 0
- H Newman Reid Trophies: 0
- Goodall Cups: 0

The Gold Coast Blue Tongues (formerly the Brisbane Blue Tongues) was a semi-professional ice hockey team based in Bundall, Queensland, Australia. The team was a member of the Australian Ice Hockey League (AIHL). The Blue Tongues were founded in 2005 as an expansion AIHL team and played in the league for eight seasons between 2005 and 2012. The team’s home venue was Iceland Bundall, located on the Gold Coast, Queensland. The Blue Tongues never won any major titles and ceased operations in 2015.

== History ==
=== Establishment ===
The Gold Coast Blue Tongues were founded in 2005 as the Brisbane Blue Tongues. The Blue Tongues were announced as an Australian Ice Hockey League (AIHL) expansion team along with the Central Coast Rhinos, increasing the league membership from six to eight teams. Originally located in Brisbane, the team’s first home venue was Iceworld Boondall. The team’s chosen name and logo was a nod to the native blue tongue lizard, commonly found in Brisbane and South-East Queensland. Garnet Radford was appointed the team's first general manager.

=== AIHL era ===
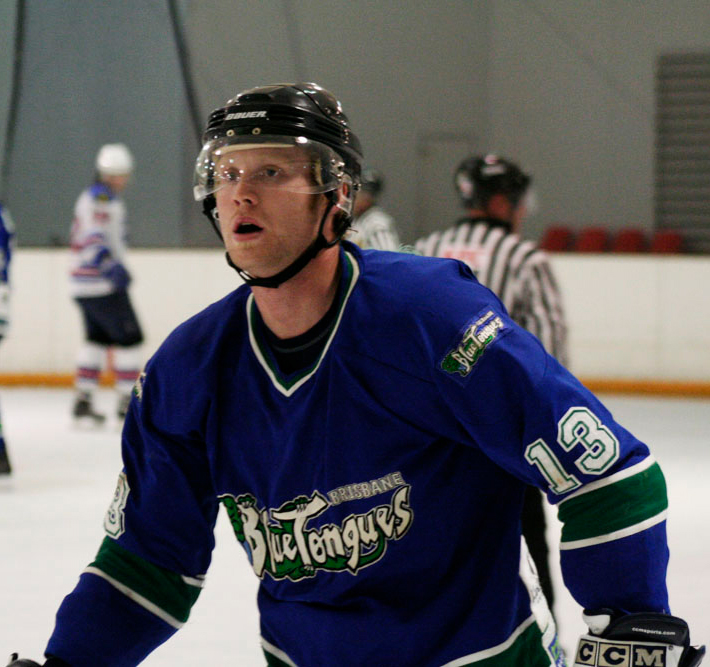
Future Australian international forward, Michael Gough, playing for the Brisbane Blue Tongues in 2007

The Blue Tongues marked their inaugural AIHL game with a win on 23 April 2005. On the road in Canberra, Brisbane defeated the Canberra Knights 10-4 at the Phillip Ice Skating Centre. A goalless first period proved a poor indication for the goal rush that would follow in the second and third periods. Mark Barnsdale scored the Blue Tongues first ever goal, assisted by Kirk Raven and Chris Staneke. From that point the visiting Brisbane team scored four more unanswered goals before Matt Lehoczky gave the home fans something to cheer. The Blue Tongues continued their good second period showing in the third and once again out scored their more experienced opponents. Mikko Skinnari scored the tenth and final goal of the game for Brisbane with just over one minute remaining on the clock. Bryan Randall was the first Blue Tongues player to be sent to the penalty box, with a two-minute minor penalty for high sticking in the first period.

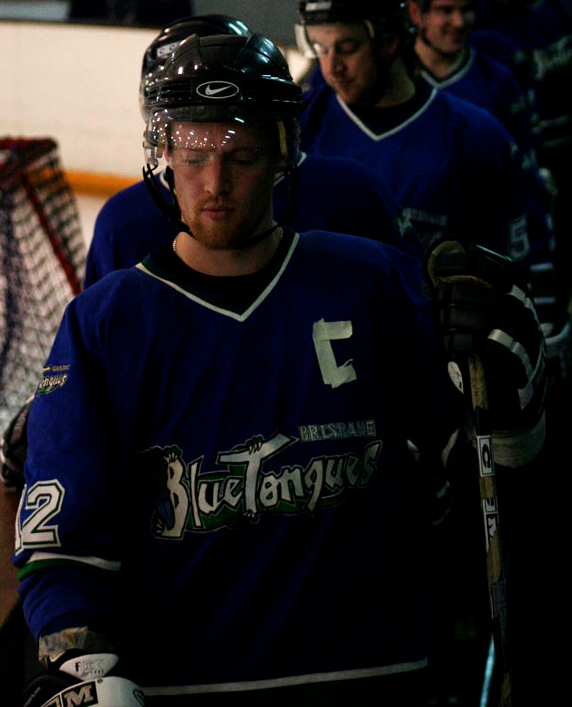
Mark Rummukainen, as stand in captain, leading the Blue Tongues team onto the ice in 2007

Brisbane finished their inaugural season in sixth position in the league standings with thirty-three points. They were five points off a finals qualification position and had a win percentage of 42%, having won twelve of twenty-six games. The Blue Tongues finished ahead of the Melbourne Ice and Central Coast Rhinos.

The following two years in Brisbane saw the Blue Tongues improve each season, finishing sixth and fifth in the standings, failing to qualify for the AIHL finals weekend on both occasions. The team was very close to qualifying in 2007 but fell three points short of finishing fourth after the team, along with two others, was handed a three-point penalty by the league for icing an illegible player. The Blue Tongues did sign two ex-NHL players during this time. First, in 2006, on 6 June, the team announced the signing of Rob Zamuner. Zamnuner had spent thirteen seasons playing in the NHL with teams such as Boston Bruins and Tampa Bay Lightning. Second, in 2007, the Blue Tongues secured the services of goaltender Tyrone Garner. Garner was a New York Islanders draft pick from 1998 and later played three games in the NHL for the Calgary Flames before a hockey career that took him around the globe.

In 2008, the Blue Tongues appointed David Emblem as president and general manager. Emblem, originally from Montreal, Canada, stepped into the new role with the team possessing a vast hockey experience, having won two Goodall Cups and representing Australia at the World championships in the 1980’s. Emblem oversaw a period of great change for the team as they relocated to the Gold Coast, Queensland. The Blue Tongues new home venue would be Iceland Bundall, located in the Gold Coast suburb of Bundall. The reasons for the move were attributed to the team’s new sponsorship deal with Bartercard, who are headquartered on the Gold Coast, and for improving team integration between the Australian and import players. The Blue Tongues were also renamed the Gold Coast Blue Tongues (Bartercard Gold Coast Blue Tongues for sponsorship reasons). The move did present facility difficulties for the team and the AIHL. The small ice sheet at the rink, according to the rink owners, was never intended for senior ice hockey and there were consistent concerns raised about the suitability and safety of the venue by the league and traveling teams. Emblem did continue one Blue Tongues tradition of signing import players with NHL experience when he secured the services of one time Tampa Bay Lightining player Gaétan Royer for the 2008 AIHL season.

Despite the issues, in 2009, the Blue Tongues enjoyed their best season in the AIHL. They won fourteen of twenty-four regular season games and had a +22 goal difference that led them to finishing fourth in the league standings and qualifying for finals for the first time. For their maiden, and only, finals weekend, Gold Coast traveled to the Hunter Ice Skating Stadium in Newcastle. Playing in the second semi-final, the Blue Tongues faced the Newcastle North Stars, who had finished third in the regular season. In front of a 1,000 strong home crowd, the semi-final was a close game for the first two periods with both teams posting three goals each. However, Newcastle’s Canadian forward, Steven Kaye, proved the difference between the two teams and scored two unanswered goals in the third period to clinch his personal hat-trick and the win for the home team. The Blue Tongues were eliminated and missed out on advancing to the grand final to compete for the historic Goodall Cup. The three finals goal scorers for the Blue Tongues were Henrik Ivarsson, André Selander and Brad Smulders.

The Blue Tongues remained a consistent performer for the remainder of their time in the league, finishing fifth in 2010 and 2011 before finishing third in the Easton conference in 2012. Each time missing out on a return to finals. The Blue Tongues' Matt Amado did however set an AIHL goal scoring record in 2011. The duel Canadian/Portuguese import forward scored 42 goals in the regular season, beating the previous record of 39 set in 2007 by himself when the team was located in Brisbane.

=== Suspension and eventual demise ===
The issues raised with the Iceland rink when the team moved to the new location in 2008 had never been resolved. The situation led to tensions between the league, traveling teams, the Blue Tongues and the rink ownership. In 2011 and 2012, these issues came to a head when the Blue Tongues had to cancel two home games, against the Sydney Ice Dogs in 2011 and Melbourne Ice in 2012, due to the unsafe and unplayable ice surface at Iceland. These cancellations, led to the rink owner evicting the Blue Tongues from the venue and forcing them, at short notice, to seek alternative arrangements for the final seven AIHL home games in the 2012 season. The Blue Tongues managed to secure Iceworld Acacia Ridge in Brisbane for the final seven fixtures of the season, however, due to the limited ice time availability, the games would be scheduled for 10:30pm, despite the best negotiating efforts by the Blue Tongues to secure more appropriate ice time. The team confirmed this was only a temporary arrangement and that they intended to return to the Gold Coast when possible. The game that was abruptly halted on the Gold Coast vs the Melbourne Ice was rescheduled to be replayed in Melbourne at the Melbourne Icehouse, despite the Ice being within their rights to claim a forfeit victory.

Following the conclusion of the AIHL season, In October 2012, the league along with the Blue Tongues jointly announced, through Deputy Commissioner Ben Kieley, the suspension of the Blue Tongues AIHL license for 2013. The team had explored different options for a home venue for 2013, including building a temporary professional rink on the Gold Coast or temporarily relocating to Brisbane, Erina or Perth, but had ultimately been unsuccessful in securing a financially viable and workable solution. The two parties committed to working together to explore all options to returning the Blue Tongues to competition in 2014, including building a new proposed $15 million twin-sheet ice sports facility on the Gold Coast.

In November 2013, it was revealed the situation to find a workable home venue for the Blue Tongues had not shifted and that the team’s license would remain suspended for the 2014 season. The team had continued its search for a new home and progressed the proposal for building a new ice sports stadium, with a business plan and architectural designs complete. The new aim is for the team to get back on the ice for the 2015 season. Dave Emblem had reportedly joined the Mayor’s Trade Mission to China and Taiwan to continue discussions with potential investors in building a new ice sports facility on the Gold Coast.

In 2015, the AIHL released its 2015 season game schedule, and the Gold Coast Blue Tongues did not feature. The Blue Tongues General Manager, Dave Emblem, had unsuccessfully continued to try and find a sponsor to build a new twin-sheet facility on the Gold Coast. He had also unsuccessfully taken the proposal to the local Council, who, despite some member interest, were unwilling to commit Government funding to the proposal. With no solution found in two years, the Gold Coast Blue Tongues’ AIHL license expired in 2015, ended the team’s involvement in top level ice hockey in Australia. The team then ceased operations.

Following the demise of the Blue Tongues, the AIHL canvassed the Brisbane ice hockey community to gauge if there was any interest from another ownership group for a new team in the state’s capital.

== Season-by-season record ==
Champions	Runners-up	Third Place

Gold Coast Blue Tongues all-time AIHL record
Season	Regular season											Finals weekend								Top points scorer	
Season	P	W	T^{1}	L	OW	OL	GF	GA	GD	Pts	Finish	P	W	L	GF	GA	Result	Semi-final	Goodall Cup final	Name	Points
2005	26	8	1	13	4	–	112	112	+0	33	6th	–								(Canada) Bryan Randall	32
2006	28	10	–	17	1	–	129	138	-9	32	6th	–								(Canada) Jean-Philippe Brière	55
2007	28	15	–	9	–	4	126	111	+15	46^{2}	5th	–								(Canada) Matt Amado	62
2008	28	8	–	17	–	3	104	154	-50	27	7th	–								(Canada) Gaétan Royer	33
2009	24	13	–	7	1	3	108	86	+22	44	4th	1	–	1	3	5	Semi-finalist	Lost 3–5 (North Stars)	–	(Netherlands) Brad Smulders	76
2010	24	9	–	13	1	1	84	107	-23	30	5th	–								(United States) Mike McRae	47
2011	28	13	–	12	1	2	120	115	+5	43	5th	–								(Canada) Matt Amado	69
2012	24	10	–	11	–	3	81	85	-4	33	3rd, Easton	–								(United States) Mike McRae	50
Total	210	86	1	99	8	16	864	908	-44	288		1	–	1	3	5				(United States) Mike McRae	151

^{1} As of the 2006 AIHL season, all games will have a winner.
^{2} The AIHL imposed the penalty of deducting 3 competition points to the Blue Tongues for playing unregistered player Jani Pekkarinen.

== Honours ==
=== Franchise Awards ===
Each season the Blue Tongues held an annual awards night where the team awarded a number of players and members of the Blue Tongue hockey community.

Season	MVP	Local	Most improved	Rookie	Fan
2006	(Canada) Jean-Philippe Brière	(Australia) David Upton	(Australia) Kirk Raven	–	–
2008	(Canada) Gaétan Royer	(Australia) Ross Howell	(Australia) Cameron Trew	(Australia) Jack Connor	(Australia) Craig Duncan & Ashley Hodson
2009	(Netherlands) Brad Smulders	(Australia) Jon Bale & Ross Howell	(Australia) Cameron Trew	–	(Australia) Craig Duncan
2010	(Canada) Dallas Costanzo	(Australia) Ross Howell	(Australia) Cameron Trew	–	(Australia) Craig Duncan
2011	(Sweden) Tobias Falk	(Australia) Luke Fiveash	(Australia) Brad Young & Jack Connor	(Australia) Alexander Hall	–

== Players ==
=== Last roster ===
Team roster for the 2012 AIHL season

Gold Coast Blue Tongues roster - 2012 AIHL season
Active roster		Coaching staff
Goaltenders: 30 (Switzerland) Alain Giauque (I); 1 (Australia) Anthony Kimlin; 1 (Australia) Nicholas Novysedlak; 1 (Australia) Kane Easterbrook; Defencemen: 4 (Australia) Greg Bay; 22 (Australia) Marco Bertossa; 44 (United States) Adam Blanchette (I); 27 (Australia) Ross Howell; 12 (Canada) Matt Maycock (I); 88 (Australia) Jordan Millen; 66 (Australia) Casey Minson; 55 (United States) Tom Pesce (I); 22 (Canada) James Sanford (I); 5 (Australia) Ben Spillane; 8 (Australia) Cameron Trew (A)	Forwards: 10 (Australia) Jon Bale; 21 (Australia) Anthony Barnes; 7 (Switzerland) Jeremy Brücker; 11 (Switzerland) Andreas Camenzind; 6 (Australia) Jack Connor; 14 (Australia) Matt Courtney; 16 (Canada) Etienne Du Toit (I); 9 (Australia) Adam Geric (C); 14 (Australia) Alexander Hall; 15 (Australia) Matthew Johnson; 55 (Australia) Carter Lawrence; 13 (United States) Mike McRae (I) (A); 10 (Australia) Ben O'Driscoll; 19 (Canada) Matt Papineau (I)	Head Coach: (Australia) Peter Nixon; Coaches: (Canada) Matt Maycock; (Australia) Craig Duncan; (Australia) Sean Garvan; (Australia) Ian Sung; (Australia) Brad Cassidy; Legend (C) Captain (A) Alternate Captain (I) Import player Statistics; Average age: 25.1; Average height: 182.4 cm Average weight: 88.3 kg Win%: 46%
Last updated on: 19 April 2022
Elite Prospects

=== Notable former players ===
A list of players that have played at least one game for the Blue Tongues and who have also played at least one game in the National Hockey League (NHL).

Name	Year(s)	NHL team(s)
(Canada) Rob Zamuner	2006	Rangers; Lightning; Senators; Bruins
(Canada) Tyrone Garner	2007	Calgary Flames
(Canada) Gaétan Royer	2008	Tampa Bay Lightning

=== Franchise all-time player records ===
These are the top-five all-time player records in franchise history in the following categories: Appearance, points, penalty minutes and points per game.

Appearances
No.	Name	Pos	Games
1	(Australia) Jon Bale	Forward	155
2	(Australia) Ross Howell	Defenceman	154
3	(Australia) Ben Spillane	Defenceman	131
4	(Australia) David Upton	Forward	116
5	(Australia) Marco Bertossa	Defenceman	114

Penalty minutes
No.	Name	Pos	PIM
1	(Canada) Don Burke	Defenceman	472
2	(United States) Mike McRae	Forward	250
3	(Australia) Jon Bale	Forward	249
4	(Australia) David Upton	Forward	234
5	(Australia) Ben Spillane	Defenceman	193

Save percentage
No.	Name	Pos	SV%
1	(Australia) Anthony Kimlin	Goaltender	0.935
2	(Australia) Luke Fiveash	Goaltender	0.883
3	(Switzerland) Alain Giauque	Goaltender	0.879
4	(Canada) Tyrone Garner	Goaltender	0.877
5	(Finland) Simo Mustonen	Goaltender	0.852

Points
No.	Name	Pos	Points
1	(United States) Mike McRae	Forward	150
2	(Canada) Matt Amado	Forward	131
3	(Australia) David Upton	Forward	123
4	(Netherlands) Brad Smulders	Forward	76
5	(Australia) Jon Bale	Forward	72

Points per game
No.	Name	Pos	PPG
1	(Netherlands) Brad Smulders	Forward	3.45
2	(Canada) Matt Amado	Forward	2.79
3	(Canada) Martin Paquet	Forward	2.54
4	(Canada) Jean-Philippe Brière	Forward	2.50
5	(Sweden) Tobias Falk	Forward	2.32

Points per season
No.	Name	Pos	Points
1	(Netherlands) Brad Smulders	Forward	76
2	(Canada) Matt Amado	Forward	69
3	(Sweden) Tobias Falk	Forward	65
4	(Canada) Matt Amado	Forward	62
5	(Canada) Jean-Philippe Brière	Forward	55

== Team staff ==
Current as of 2012 AIHL season.

Blue Tongues staff
Back office staff
Role	Name
Head coach	(Australia) Peter Nixon
Assistant coach	(Canada) Matt Maycock
Team manager	(Australia) Craig Duncan
Equipment manager	(Australia) Brad Cassidy
Physio	(Australia) Ian Sung
Front office staff
Role	Name
General manager	(Australia) Dave Emblem
Assistant manager	(Australia) Sean Garvan
Marketing manager	(Australia) Matt Haddad
Media & PR manager	(Australia) Kanchan Khanna
Website designer	(Australia) Sam Hansen
Graphic designer	(Australia) Isaac Morisson
Game day staff
Role	Name
Operations manager	(Australia) Steven Montour
Ops team member	(Australia) Daniel Jansson
Ops team member	(Australia) Kyle West
Ops team member	(Australia) Chris Rainesford
Ops team member	(Australia) Erik Bitmanis
Announcer	(Australia) Brendan Boyle
Announcer	(Australia) Raff Himing
Scorer	(Australia) Corrine Conner
Committee
Role	Name
Committee chair	(Australia) Dave Emblem
Committee member	(Australia) Kevin Sands
Committee member	(Australia) Don Burke
Committee member	(Australia) Paul Rayner
Committee member	(Australia) Glen Kercher
Committee member	(Australia) Brian Quartarolo

== Leaders ==
=== Team captains ===
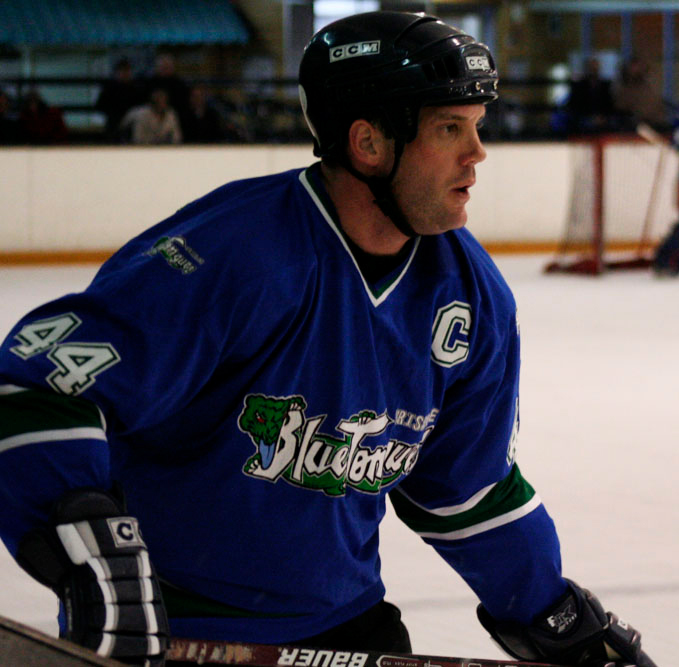
Don Burke as captain for the Blue Tongues in 2007. Don was the team's maiden captain and continued in the leadership role for 3 seasons.

The Blue Tongues had four captains in the team's history.

No.	Name	Term
1	(Australia) Don Burke	2005–07
2	(United States) Billy Crumm	2008
3	(Australia) Ross Howell	2009–11
4	(Australia) Adam Geric	2012

=== Head coaches ===
The Blue Tongues had three head coaches in the team's known history. Head coaches for the years when the team was based in Brisbane (2006–07) are unknown.

No.	Name	Term
1	(Australia) Dave Byer	2005
2	(Australia) Kevin Sands	2008–10
3	(Australia) Peter Nixon	2011–12

=== General managers ===
The Blue Tongues had two general managers (GMs) in the team's history.

No.	Name	Term
1	(Australia) Garnet Radford	2005–07
2	(Australia) David Emblem	2008–12

== Team records ==
Record	Details
Firsts
First AIHL game	23 April 2005 (10-4 win over the Knights in Canberra)
First AIHL win	23 April 2005 (10-4 win over the Knights in Canberra)
First AIHL loss	30 April 2004 (4-8 loss to the Ice Dogs in Brisbane)
First AIHL finals appearance	29 August 2009 (3-5 loss to the North Stars in Newcastle)
Lasts
Last AIHL game	26 August 2012 (4-5 (SO) loss to the Adrenaline in Adelaide)
Last AIHL win	25 August 2012 (5-1 win over the Adrenaline in Adelaide)
Last AIHL loss	26 August 2012 (4-5 (SO) loss to the Adrenaline in Adelaide)
Last AIHL finals appearance	29 August 2009 (3-5 loss to the North Stars in Newcastle)
Single matches
Record goal scoring game	18 goals (20 August 2006 10-8 win over the Rhinos in Erina)
Record win	10-2 (against the Ice Dogs on 1 May 2005)
Record loss	3-11 (against the North Stars on 21 August 2010)
Wins/losses
Most season wins	15 wins (2007 season)
Fewest season wins	8 wins (2008 season)
Most season losses	20 losses (2008 season)
Fewest season losses	10 losses (2009 season)
Record winning streak	6 matches (2007 & 2009 seasons)
Record losing streak	11 matches (2005/06 & 2010/11 seasons)
Points
Most season points	46 points (2007 season)
Fewest season points	30 points (2010 season)

== Broadcasting ==
TV and Streaming:
Briz 31 (UHF Channel 31) (2007–08) – Domestic television broadcasting on the Brisbane community television station of all home games for the Blue Tongues in 2007 and 2008. The channel also broadcast the 2009 AIHL Finals weekend when the Blue Tongues qualified.
Self-broadcast (2008–09) – Domestic and international internet streaming broadcast of all Blue Tongues home games. The very first AIHL team to stream games via the internet. Produced by Blue Tongues supporter Mike Crowhurst from Cunning Crow Productions and commentated by Blue Tongues Team Assistant Adrian Barclay, games were available on www.slapshot.com.au.
