= Erina Ice Arena =

Public ice rink in New South Wales, Australia

- Interactive map of Erina Ice Arena
- Location: Erina, New South Wales, Australia
- Coordinates: 33°26′15″S 151°23′25″E
- Surface: 60 m × 30 m (197 ft × 98 ft)

Construction
- Opened: 2004 (22 years ago)

Website
- www.erinaicearena.com.au

Erina Ice Arena is an ice sports and public skating centre, located on the Central Coast of New South Wales. The arena was built in 2004. The rink is used for public skating, figure skating and ice hockey.

The venue serves as the home rink for the Central Coast Rhinos in the Australian Ice Hockey League.

== See also ==
- List of ice rinks in Australia
