= Sydney Ice Arena =

Sport venue in Australia

- Interactive map of Sydney Ice Arena
- Address: 11 Solent Circuit, Norwest, NSW, Australia
- Location: Norwest, New South Wales
- Coordinates: 33.73213°S 150.96177°E
- Capacity: 1,000

Construction
- Opened: 2002
- Closed: October 9, 2017
- Demolished: October 24, 2017

Tenant
- Norwest Emperors

Website
- www.sydneyicearena.com.au

Sydney Ice Arena was an ice sports and public ice skating centre, located in Norwest, New South Wales. It hosted a number of major events, including Australian Ice Hockey League games.

A development application was submitted by property owner Hillsong, seeking to demolish the arena to make way for apartment blocks with retail facilities, and was approved by council. Demolition of the arena was scheduled to begin on October 24, 2017.

== Facilities ==
At the time of construction this arena was the largest and best in Australia. The arena contained an Olympic Sized ice hockey rink 60 metres x 30 metres which was also used for other ice-based sports and general ice-skating by the public and school groups. There was also a large grand stand with 750 seats along one side of the arena for spectators, with the addition of other 300 seats on the other side of the rink. Other facilities included a 700 sqm gymnasium, a large first floor kiosk overlooking the ice, a rinkside cafe, ice-skating shop and skate hire shop. There was parking for 200 cars, 100 of which were undercover.

== See also ==
- List of ice rinks in Australia
