= 2024 AIHL season =

- League: Australian Ice Hockey League
- Sport: Ice hockey
- Duration: 6 April 2024 – 25 August 2024

Regular season
- H Newman Reid Trophy: Sydney Bears (4th title)
- Season MVP: Kaden Elder (Adrenaline)
- Top scorer: Adam Kadlec (70 points) (Bears)

Goodall Cup
- Champions: Canberra Brave (3rd title)
- Runners-up: Melbourne Ice
- Finals MVP: Jake Ratcliffe (Brave)

AIHL seasons
- 2023 2025

The 2024 AIHL season was the 23nd season of the Australian Ice Hockey League (AIHL). The season consisted of 155 total games, split between 150 regular season games and a five-game Goodall Cup Finals post-season. The regular season ran from 6 April to 11 August 2024. The Finals ran from 23 to 25 August 2024 in Melbourne, Australia. The Sydney Bears claimed a conference-Premiership double by winning the Hellyer conference trophy and H Newman Reid Trophy. The Newcastle Northstars claimed the Rurak conference trophy, while the Canberra Brave were crowned AIHL Champions and hoisted the Goodall Cup after defeating the Melbourne Ice in the grand final. The much-improved Central Coast Rhinos picked up the wooden spoon for a second year running.

== Teams ==
In 2024 the AIHL had 10 teams split into two conferences, Rurak and Hellyer, competing in the league.

2024 AIHL teams
Hellyer Conference
Team	City	Arena	Head Coach	Captain
Melbourne Ice	(Victoria (state)) Melbourne	O'Brien Icehouse	(Canada) Kerry Goulet	(Canada) Mackenzie Caruana
Melbourne Mustangs	(Victoria (state)) Melbourne	O'Brien Icehouse	(Canada) Scott Timmins	(Australia) Todd Cutter
Perth Thunder	(Western Australia) Perth	Perth Ice Arena	(Australia) Benjamin Breault	(Australia) Jamie Woodman
Sydney Bears	(New South Wales) Sydney	Macquarie Ice Rink	(Australia) Vlad Rubes	(Australia) Ryan Annesley
Sydney Ice Dogs	(New South Wales) Sydney	Macquarie Ice Rink	(Australia) Jason Kvisle	(Australia) Daniel Pataky
Rurak Conference
Team	City	Arena	Head Coach	Captain
Adelaide Adrenaline	(South Australia) Adelaide	Adelaide IceArenA	(Canada) Kaden Elder	(Australia) Joey MacDougall
Brisbane Lightning	(Queensland) Brisbane	Boondall Iceworld	(Australia) Terry Kiliwnik	No Captain
Canberra Brave	(Australian Capital Territory) Canberra	Phillip Ice Skating Centre	(Australia) Stuart Philps	(Australia) Kai Miettinen
Central Coast Rhinos	(New South Wales) Central Coast	Erina Ice Arena	(Australia) Ron Kuprowsky	(United States) Robert Malloy
Newcastle Northstars	(New South Wales) Newcastle	Hunter Ice Skating Stadium	(Canada) Kevin Noble	(Australia) Liam Manwarring

== League business ==
The 2024 regular season fixture list was released publicly by the AIHL on 21 October, confirming all 10 teams from 2023 would be returning to compete in 2024. 2024 AIHL Finals information was released by the league in February 2024, confirming dates and location. The Goodall Cup, H Newman Reid Trophy, Rurak and Hellyer conference trophies would continue to the be prizes AIHL teams would compete for in 2024. The league held its official season launch event at Bondi Icebergs Club on 20 March 2024. Mick McCormack was appointed as the first patron of the AIHL at the event.

The AIHL accepted an invitation by the International Ice Hockey Federation (IIHF) to open up an additional import slot for the 2024 season to Ukrainian players seeking respite from the Russian invasion of Ukraine. Each AIHL would be allowed to sign one Ukrainian player from Ukraine at no cost to their player points-cap.

The AIHL confirmed AIHL.TV would return in 2024 on 4 March. The paid service would provide live and on-demand online streaming of all AIHL regular season and finals games, 155 games in total. With the sudden collapse of 2023 service provided Clutch in late 2023, the service provider for AIHL.TV in 2024 moved to Swedish company StayLive AB. Thought fox Media Group, ATC Productions, Spacequake Sports and Front Row Screens (FRS Sport) continue as the four local production companies associated with the service. 2023 season streams would also be made available on the service. On 8 June 2024, the AIHL.TV service was expanded to include the release of an app on Apple iOS and Android Play.

In July 2024, the AIHL announced a new Finals major sponsorship deal with Hungry Jack's. This was the league's first major Finals sponsorship since Air Canada's deal that ended at the conclusion of 2018. The Hungry Jack's deal will include branding at the Melbourne Icehouse, special activities and promotions during the Finals weekend.

=== Exhibition games ===
In 2024, the Newcastle Northstars and Central Coast Rhinos were the only two teams to schedule exhibitions games. The pair faced off over two games in Newcastle and Erina, Central Coast in March 2024. Apart from these two exhibition games, the Sydney Ice Dogs, Brisbane Lightning and Adelaide Adrenaline arranged intraclub pre-season exhibition games. This included an early March men's and women's showcase in Brisbane and an alumni vs current team match-up in Adelaide in early April.

2024 AIHL exhibition games
Date	Time	Away	Score	Home	Location	Recap
16 March 2024	17:00	Central Coast Rhinos	8–3	Newcastle Northstars	Hunter Ice Skating Stadium	Ref
23 March 2024	15:15	Newcastle Northstars	2–3 (OT)	Central Coast Rhinos	Erina Ice Arena	Ref

=== Personnel changes ===
Ron Kuprowsky ended his five-year stint with the Sydney Bears as their head coach in October 2023. During this time, Ron guided the Bears to two consecutive grand finals appearances, one Hellyer conference trophy and one championship title. Kuprowsky was later unveiled as the new head coach of the Central Coast Rhinos in December 2023, replacing Ashley Marsh. Marsh moved into a new coaching role with the Rhinos. In February 2024, the Brisbane Lightning announced the hiring of the vastly experienced Canadian Mike Sirant as an associate coach. Sirant joined the Queenslanders after stepping down from his 30-year position as head coach of the University of Manitoba hockey program. In April 2024, Both the Sydney Bears and Melbourne Mustangs appointed new head coaches. American Tyler Huberty took over the vacant head coaching role at the Bears. Huberty moved to Sydney after spending four years as the assistant coach at the University of Oklahoma hockey program. Scott Timmins takes over head coaching responsibilities for the Mustangs but remains on the playing roster too. Timmins links up for the Mustangs for the third season in a row but his first as a player/coach. Timmins replaces Jon Moses, who was acting interim coach for the second half of last season following the departure of Patrick McMahon.

In June 2024, the Adelaide Adrenaline released Stu Henly from his head coaching duties and appointed Canadian forward Kaden Elder has player/coach for the remainder of the 2024 season. In July 2024, the Sydney Bears parted ways with American head coach Tyler Huberty. Huberty's removal shocked the AIHL community with the Bears sitting top of the league standings at the time. Former Sydney Bears player and team icon Vlad Rubes was appointed Huberty's replacement.

=== Player transfers ===
All player transfers by the ten AIHL teams for season 2024.

==== Interclub transfers ====
Nat	Player	Previous team	New team
(Canada)	Josh Adkins	Newcastle Northstars	Adelaide Adrenaline
(United States)	Austin Albrecht	Canberra Brave	Melbourne Ice
(Australia)	Mackenzie Bolger	Sydney Ice Dogs	Central Coast Rhinos
(Australia)	Ellesse Carini	Sydney Bears	Melbourne Ice
(Australia)	Hayden Dawes	Sydney Bears	Central Coast Rhinos
(Australia)	Hayden Dawes*	Central Coast Rhinos	Melbourne Mustangs
(Australia)	Justin Dixon	Melbourne Ice	Melbourne Mustangs
(Sweden)	Joakim Erdugan	Central Coast Rhinos	Melbourne Ice
(Australia)	Glen Forbes-White	Brisbane Lightning	Central Coast Rhinos
(Australia)	Mike Giorgi	Canberra Brave	Melbourne Mustangs
(Australia)	Justin Harrison	Sydney Bears	Central Coast Rhinos
(Australia)	Sam Hodic	Melbourne Ice	Brisbane Lightning
(Australia)	Joey Hughes	Canberra Brave	Melbourne Ice
(Australia)	Zane Jones	Newcastle Northstars	Perth Thunder
(Australia)	John Kennedy	Newcastle Northstars	Perth Thunder
(Japan)	Yuga Kikuchi	Melbourne Ice	Melbourne Mustangs
(Australia)	Brody Lindal	Melbourne Ice	Sydney Bears
(Australia)	Matthew Price	Newcastle Northstars	Adelaide Adrenaline
(Australia)	Jake Riley	Canberra Brave	Sydney Bears
(Australia)	Drew Robson	Perth Thunder	Newcastle Northstars
(Australia)	Jayden Ryan	Central Coast Rhinos	Newcastle Northstars
(Canada)	Andrew Smardon	Newcastle Northstars	Central Coast Rhinos
(Australia)	Thomas Steven	Sydney Bears	Canberra Brave
(Australia)	Mac Tutton	Central Coast Rhinos	Sydney Bears

* Mid-season transfer.

==== Retirements ====
Nat	Player	Team	New role
(Australia)	Damian Bright	Brisbane Lightning	No team
(United States)	Joshua Lammon	Sydney Bears	No team

==== New signings ====
Nat	Player	Previous team	New team
(Canada)	Jeremiah Addison	Utah Grizzlies	Perth Thunder
(Australia)	Derry Adler	Southern Jokers	Brisbane Lightning
(Canada)	Chance Adrian	Dalmeny Sabres	Brisbane Lightning
(Malaysia)	Mohd Hariz Ananda	Outlaws	Melbourne Mustangs
(Canada)	John Aonso	Fredonia Blue Devils	Melbourne Ice
(Australia)	Oliver Ashby	Seattle Jr. Kraken	Melbourne Mustangs
(Germany)	Maximilian Astner	No team	Canberra Brave
(France)	Aziz Baazzi	Gothiques d'Amiens	Central Coast Rhinos
(Canada)	Connor Bartholomew	No team	Sydney Ice Dogs
(Australia)	Samuel Bartlett	Melbourne Sharks	Melbourne Ice
(France)	Benjamin Berard	Diables Rouges de Briançon	Perth Thunder
(France)	Léo Bertein	Corsaires de Dunkerque	Perth Thunder
(Australia)	Hunter Boland	Southern Drop Bears	Brisbane Lightning
(Australia)	Connor Bolger	No team	Central Coast Rhinos
(Mexico)	Estefano Bonfante	Sydney Bombers	Central Coast Rhinos
(Canada)	Danick Bouchard	Gothiques d'Amiens	Central Coast Rhinos
(Australia)	Joseph Braun	Sydney Pigeons	Sydney Bears
(United States)	Matthew Brown	CP Milenio Logroño	Central Coast Rhinos
(Australia)	Max Bu	Norwest Emperors	Sydney Ice Dogs
(Australia)	Matt Buskas	Canberra Blades	Canberra Brave
(Canada)	Bradley Campbell	Kings County Rivermen	Brisbane Lightning
(New Zealand)	Jacob Carey	New Jersey Rockets	Canberra Brave
(United States)	Matt Clark	Birmingham Bulls	Canberra Brave
(Australia)	Billy Cliff	No team	Sydney Ice Dogs
(Australia)	Tyler Colev	West Coast Flyers Blue	Perth Thunder
(Australia)	Bray Crowder	Adirondack Thunder	Sydney Ice Dogs
(United Kingdom)	Richard Crowe	Solihull Barons	Sydney Bears
(Netherlands)	Mike Dalhuisen	Gyergyói HK	Sydney Ice Dogs
(Australia)	Cooper Davidson-Peacock	Adelaide Falcons	Adelaide Adrenaline
(Australia)	Brad Demmitt	Sydney Sabres	Sydney Ice Dogs
(Canada)	Mathieu Desautels	EV Lindau Islanders	Newcastle Northstars
(Canada)	Kesho Donald	No team	Sydney Ice Dogs
(Canada)	Shaun Dosanjh	IHC Leuven Chiefs	Adelaide Adrenaline
(Canada)	Michael Douglas	York Lions	Sydney Ice Dogs
(Canada)	Mitchell Dyck	Winkler Royals	Brisbane Lightning
(New Zealand)	Chris Eaden	Canterbury Red Devils	Sydney Bears
(Canada)	Kaden Elder	Outlook Ice Hawks	Adelaide Adrenaline
(Australia)	Lachlan Fixter	Brisbane Spitfires	Brisbane Lightning
(Canada)	Logan Flodell	Manchester Storm	Melbourne Mustangs
(Canada)	Rylan Freed	St. Brieux/Lake Lenore Rivals	Melbourne Mustangs
(Mongolia)	Batu Gendunov	Darkhan	Brisbane Lightning
(Australia)	Tobie Gilchrist	Pacific Coast Academy	Melbourne Ice
(Australia)	Finlay Gordon	West Coast Flyers Blue	Perth Thunder
(Australia)	Flyn Gower	Melbourne Glaciers	Melbourne Ice
(New Zealand)	Matheson Graham	Canterbury Red Devils	Melbourne Mustangs
(Australia)	Jeremy Granger	Sydney Bombers	Sydney Bears
(Australia)	Quentin Greenwood	Southern Puckers	Brisbane Lightning
(Australia)	Sean Greer	No team	Adelaide Adrenaline
(Australia)	Zachery Gumm	Southern Jokers	Brisbane Lightning
(Sweden)	Samuel Hou Gustafsson	Courchevel-Méribel-Pralognan	Central Coast Rhinos
(Australia)	Jacob Haley	Braves IHC	Melbourne Mustangs
(Australia)	Sean Hamilton	Northern Chiefs	Perth Thunder
(Australia)	Adam Harper	Pacific Coast Academy Prep	Melbourne Mustangs
(Australia)	Arki Hearn-Crombie	Newcastle Northstars U17	Central Coast Rhinos
(United States)	Lucas Herrmann	Pensacola Ice Flyers	Sydney Bears
(Japan)	Yu Hikosaka	Red Eagles Hokkaido	Perth Thunder
(Australia)	Bryce Hodges	Southern Puckers	Brisbane Lightning
(Australia)	Ronan Hoy	Southern Drop Bears	Brisbane Lightning
(Japan)	Mitsuaki Inoue	Red Eagles Hokkaido	Newcastle Northstars
(Japan)	Tatsunoshin Ishida	Yokohama Grits	Melbourne Ice
(Australia)	Patrick Ivens	Brisbane Spitfires	Brisbane Lightning
(Australia)	Eugene Ju	Polyflor Raptors	Sydney Bears
(United States)	Adam Kadlec	No team	Sydney Bears
(New Zealand)	CJ Kemp	Ontario Jr Reign	Sydney Ice Dogs
(Australia)	Raymond Khalil	Braves IHC	Melbourne Ice
(Australia)	Hayden Klugerman	Airdrie Stars U18	Newcastle Northstars
(Australia)	Daniel Koudelka	Adelaide Generals	Adelaide Adrenaline
(Canada)	Chris Kushneriuk	North Dundas Rockets	Sydney Bears
(Australia)	Jed Lake	Pacific Coast Academy	Melbourne Ice
(Canada)	Matthew Lavergne	Southern Puckers	Brisbane Lightning
(Canada)	Yoann Levesque	Northern Chiefs	Adelaide Adrenaline
(Sweden)	Arvid Ljung	IHK Comet Halden	Sydney Ice Dogs
(Australia)	Skyler Luo	Battle Creek Kernels	Perth Thunder
(Canada)	Alex MacDonald	Toulouse-Blagnac Hockey Club	Sydney Ice Dogs
(Australia)	Matt Marasco	Canberra Blades	Canberra Brave
(Japan)	Kenta Matsukane	East Hokkaido Cranes	Sydney Bears
(Australia)	Bodhi Matthew	Adelaide Generals	Canberra Brave
(Canada)	Kyler Matthews	Birmingham Bulls	Newcastle Northstars
(Australia)	Brayden Maybee	Sun Devils	Perth Thunder
(Australia)	Marcel McGuiness	Adelaide Redwings	Adelaide Adrenaline
(Australia)	Remy McGuiness	Adelaide Redwings	Adelaide Adrenaline
(Canada)	Curtis Meger	Regina Cougars	Brisbane Lightning
(Canada)	Carson Miller	UBC Thunderbirds	Sydney Bears
(Australia)	Jack Mollee	Southern Puckers	Brisbane Lightning
(Australia)	Nathan Moncrieff	Polyflor Raptors	Sydney Bears
(Australia)	Luke Moore	No team	Brisbane Lightning
(Australia)	Spencer Nave	Melbourne Demons	Melbourne Ice
(Australia)	Oscar Noone	Sydney Sabres	Sydney Ice Dogs
(Canada)	Anand Oberoi	Arnprior Rivermen	Central Coast Rhinos
(Australia)	Stepan Olkin	Sydney Bombers	Sydney Ice Dogs
(Australia)	Luka Ouimette	Brisbane Whalers	Brisbane Lightning
(Australia)	Tyrone Oxlade	Polyflor Raptors	Sydney Bears
(Australia)	Nick Ponomarev	South Shore Kings	Melbourne Mustangs
(Australia)	Samuel Poole	PAdelaide Blackhawks	Sydney Bears
(Australia)	Max Portnov	Sydney Sting	Sydney Bears
(Australia)	Shai Rabinowitz	Frontenac Phantoms	Central Coast Rhinos
(New Zealand)	Jake Ratcliffe	Danbury Hat Tricks	Canberra Brave
(Sweden)	Jonatan Ruth	Central Coast Stingrays	Canberra Brave
(Australia)	Alistair Rye	No team	Central Coast Rhinos
(Australia)	Timothy Rye	Maryville Saints	Central Coast Rhinos
(Tunisia)	Adrien Sebag	Coqs de Courbevoie	Central Coast Rhinos
(Australia)	Colby Shumak	North Shore Warriors U17 Prep	Sydney Bears
(Australia)	Victor Sjodin	Canberra Bulls	Canberra Brave
(Australia)	Paul Smith	Central Coast Stingrays	Central Coast Rhinos
(United States)	Jeff Solow	Birmingham Bulls	Melbourne Ice
(Australia)	Patrick Sucher	Sun Devils	Perth Thunder
(Philippines)	Kenwrick Sze	Krazy to the Max	Sydney Ice Dogs
(Canada)	Rylan Toth	Foam Lake Flyers	Adelaide Adrenaline
(Finland)	Samuli Vainionpää	Koovee	Sydney Bears
(Hungary)	Nátán Vertes	Fehérvár AV19	Perth Thunder
(Ukraine)	Alexander Voronin	HC Aosta Gladiators	Adelaide Adrenaline
(United States)	Aiden Wagner	Evansville Thunderbolts	Newcastle Northstars
(Australia)	Lachie Walls	Melbourne Jets	Melbourne Ice
(Australia)	Lachlan White	Canberra Rebels	Canberra Brave
(Australia)	Jesse Wilson	Reach Rebels	Sydney Ice Dogs
(New Zealand)	Ty Wright	No team	Adelaide Adrenaline
(Canada)	Alex Yuill	Guildford Flames	Newcastle Northstars

==== Players lost ====
Nat	Player	Previous team	New team
(Australia)	Steven Adams	Central Coast Rhinos	No team
(United States)	Austin Albrecht	Canberra Brave	Maine Mariners
(Australia)	Artem Astafiev	Melbourne Mustangs	No team
(United States)	Andrew Bellant	Perth Thunder	Indy Fuel
(Australia)	Josh Bortignon	Adelaide Adrenaline	No team
(Australia)	Declan Bronte	Melbourne Ice	Franklin Pierce Ravens
(Australia)	Mitch Bye	Central Coast Rhinos	No team
(Australia)	Andreas Camenzind	Canberra Brave	No team
(Australia)	Liam Campbell	Perth Thunder	No team
(Australia)	Jack Carpenter	Melbourne Mustangs	No team
(Australia)	Lachlan Clifford	Brisbane Lightning	Brisbane Moose
(Australia)	Will Clifford	Brisbane Lightning	Brisbane Moose
(Australia)	Brendan Connors	Melbourne Mustangs	No team
(Australia)	Darren Corstens	Adelaide Adrenaline	No team
(Canada)	Tristan Côté-Cazenave	Perth Thunder	Rivière-du-Loup 3L
(United States)	Ace Cowans	Sydney Bears	No team
(Australia)	Tom Cross	Central Coast Rhinos	No team
(Australia)	Luka Dimopoulos	Central Coast Rhinos	No team
(Australia)	Nicholas Doornbos	Sydney Ice Dogs	No team
(Australia)	Ivan Doukhovnikov	Central Coast Rhinos	No team
(Australia)	Luke Doyle	Perth Thunder	Cockburn Blackhawks
(Australia)	Ryan Duchemin	Newcastle Northstars	Newcastle Northstars (ECSL)
(Russia)	Alexander Dvinyaninov	Sydney Ice Dogs	No team
(Canada)	Brandon Egli	Sydney Ice Dogs	Étoile Noire de Strasbourg
(Australia)	Darcy Flanagan	Melbourne Ice	Oxford City Stars
(Canada)	Anthony Gagnon	Perth Thunder	Rivière-du-Loup 3L
(Australia)	Logan Gallacher	Melbourne Ice	No team
(Canada)	C.J. Garcia	Perth Thunder	Manchester Storm
(Canada)	Alexandre Gauthier	Sydney Bears	No team
(Canada)	Alexis Girard	Brisbane Lightning	Laval Pétroliers
(Australia)	Andrew Glass	Canberra Brave	Adelaide Tigers
(Canada)	Andrew Hamilton	Adelaide Adrenaline	No team
(Australia)	Jake Hazel	Adelaide Adrenaline	No team
(Australia)	Joshua Healey	Perth Thunder	No team
(United States)	Brady Heppner	Sydney Ice Dogs	No team
(Australia)	Alexander Higgins	Brisbane Lightning	Southern Drop Bears
(Australia)	Mark Hobday	Central Coast Rhinos	Sydney Heat
(Australia)	Jay Hodgson	Brisbane Lightning	No team
(Canada)	Liam Hughes	Melbourne Mustangs	No team
(Australia)	Mitchell Humphries	Melbourne Mustangs	No team
(Canada)	Kyle Hunter	Sydney Ice Dogs	No team
(Slovakia)	Samuel Ivanic	Sydney Ice Dogs	Hasle-Løren IL
(United States)	Conner Jean	Perth Thunder	Kalix UHC
(Canada)	Hunter Johnson	Central Coast Rhinos	No team
(New Zealand)	Kahu Joyce	Melbourne Ice	No team
(Australia)	Adam Kimbley	Central Coast Rhinos	No team
(Germany)	Artem Klein	Melbourne Ice	Mad Dogs Mannheim
(Australia)	Brendan Kleipas	Central Coast Rhinos	Polyflor Raptors
(Germany)	Patrick Klöpper	Melbourne Ice	Hannover Scorpions
(Canada)	Kasey Kulczycki	Brisbane Lightning	Rivière-du-Loup 3L
(Australia)	Nathan Lacasse	Perth Thunder	No team
(Australia)	Paul Lazzarotto	Melbourne Ice	No team
(Australia)	Tyler Leeming	Adelaide Adrenaline	Adelaide Redwings
(Australia)	Austin Lefkowicz	Melbourne Ice	No team
(Australia)	Mathew Lindsay	Newcastle Northstars	No team
(Australia)	Savva Lukin	Central Coast Rhinos	No team
(Canada)	Andrew Masters	Central Coast Rhinos	HYC Herentals
(Australia)	Brendan McDowell	Melbourne Mustangs	No team
(Australia)	Michael McDowell	Melbourne Mustangs	No team
(Australia)	Shannon McGregor	Sydney Ice Dogs	No team
(Canada)	Marc McNulty	Sydney Bears	Maple Creek Hawks
(Australia)	Casey Minson	Melbourne Mustangs	No team
(Sweden)	Melker Molund	Newcastle Northstars	Järfälla HC
(Canada)	David Nelson	Brisbane Lightning	No team
(Australia)	Keenan Nelson	Melbourne Mustangs	Ontario Hockey Academy
(Australia)	Jake O’Brien	Adelaide Adrenaline	No team
(Australia)	Thomas Papas	Melbourne Mustangs	SAHA U17 Prep
(United States)	Jake Pappalardo	Sydney Bears	No team
(Australia)	Jaden Pine-Murphy	Brisbane Lightning	Brisbane Moose
(Canada)	Félix Plouffe	Canberra Brave	Valenciennes
(Australia)	Jett Porter	Melbourne Mustangs	A21 Academy
(Canada)	Coy Prevost	Adelaide Adrenaline	Knoxville Ice Bears
(Australia)	Dash Quartarolo	Central Coast Rhinos	Salem State Vikings
(Canada)	Brett Radford	Adelaide Adrenaline	No team
(Australia)	Mikko Rippon	Brisbane Lightning	St. Francis High Prep
(Australia)	Alexander Rose	Melbourne Mustangs	No team
(United States)	Maxwell Roth	Brisbane Lightning	Drakkars de Caen
(Australia)	Ryan Ruddle	Melbourne Mustangs	No team
(Australia)	Connor Schultz	Newcastle Northstars	No team
(Australia)	Chris Schutz	Melbourne Ice	Hammer Eisbären
(Australia)	Lachlan Shumak	Sydney Ice Dogs	No team
(Australia)	Eric Speedie	Brisbane Lightning	No team
(Canada)	Kristian Stead	Perth Thunder	Knoxville Ice Bears
(Australia)	Zachary Steele	Adelaide Adrenaline	Adelaide Redwings
(Australia)	Corey Stringer	Melbourne Ice	No team
(Czech Republic)	Lukas Subrt	Melbourne Mustangs	No team
(Australia)	Lachlan Sucher	Perth Thunder	Crystal Beach Academy
(Canada)	Brett Thompson	Adelaide Adrenaline	Adelaide Tigers
(Romania)	Zoltán-László Tőke	Melbourne Ice	CSM Corona Brașov
(Australia)	Riley Tonks	Newcastle Northstars	No team
(Sweden)	Albin Torstensson	Central Coast Rhinos	Comètes de Meudon
(Australia)	Lachlan Tripp	Brisbane Lightning	No team
(Australia)	Byron Tschuma	Melbourne Ice	No team
(Australia)	Lee Turner	Melbourne Mustangs	No team
(Australia)	Lukas Vaic	Sydney Bears	Polyflor Raptors
(United States)	Carson Vance	Canberra Brave	Birmingham Bulls
(Canada)	Connor Vermeulen	Adelaide Adrenaline	HC Wikov Hronov
(Australia)	Curtis Villani	Adelaide Adrenaline	No team
(Australia)	Tom Voller	Sydney Ice Dogs	No team
(France)	Hector Vrielynck	Melbourne Ice	No team
(Canada)	Darcy Walsh	Adelaide Adrenaline	No team
(Australia)	Jordan Warren	Melbourne Mustangs	No team
(Australia)	Thomas Wedesweiler	Newcastle Northstars	No team
(Australia)	Nicholas Windle	Perth Thunder	No team
(Australia)	Matthew Wrankmore	Central Coast Rhinos	No team
(Taiwan)	Kevin Yu	Adelaide Adrenaline	No team
(Australia)	Joe Zanlunghi	Melbourne Mustangs	No team

== Regular season ==
=== Fixtures and results ===
The 2024 regular season consists of 150 games that are scheduled to run from 6 April to 11 August 2024. Teams are split into two five-team conferences named Rurak and Hellyer. Each team plays a total of 30 regular season games, playing each other team in their conference four times (two at home and two away) and playing teams outside their conference two to three times.

==== April ====
April
Game #	Date	Time	Away	Score	Home	Location	Recap
1	6 Apr 2024	16:45	Perth Thunder	6–8	Brisbane Lightning	Iceworld Boondall
2	6 Apr 2024	17:00	Canberra Brave	3–7	Newcastle Northstars	Hunter Ice Skating Stadium
3	6 Apr 2024	17:00	Central Coast Rhinos	1–11	Melbourne Ice	O’Brien Icehouse
4	6 Apr 2024	17:00	Sydney Ice Dogs	2–6	Sydney Bears	Macquarie Ice Rink
5	7 Apr 2024	14:00	Central Coast Rhinos	0–9	Melbourne Ice	O’Brien Icehouse
6	7 Apr 2024	15:45	Perth Thunder	5–1	Brisbane Lightning	Iceworld Boondall
7	7 Apr 2024	17:00	Canberra Brave	6–1	Sydney Ice Dogs	Macquarie Ice Rink
8	13 Apr 2024	15:30	Newcastle Northstars	14–1	Central Coast Rhinos	Erina Ice Arena
9	13 Apr 2024	16:30	Sydney Bears	3–4	Adelaide Adrenaline	Adelaide Ice Arena
10	13 Apr 2024	16:30	Canberra Brave	2–7	Perth Thunder	Perth Ice Arena
11	13 Apr 2024	17:00	Brisbane Lightning	2–5	Melbourne Ice	O’Brien Icehouse
12	14 Apr 2024	14:00	Brisbane Lightning	4–7	Melbourne Mustangs	O’Brien Icehouse
13	14 Apr 2024	16:00	Sydney Ice Dogs	3–7	Newcastle Northstars	Hunter Ice Skating Stadium
14	14 Apr 2024	16:30	Canberra Brave	3–6	Perth Thunder	Perth Ice Arena
15	19 Apr 2024	19:30	Sydney Bears	9–2	Sydney Ice Dogs	Macquarie Ice Rink
16	20 Apr 2024	15:30	Sydney Bears	8–4	Central Coast Rhinos	Erina Ice Arena
17	20 Apr 2024	17:00	Perth Thunder	5–2	Melbourne Mustangs	O’Brien Icehouse
18	20 Apr 2024	17:00	Adelaide Adrenaline	1–4	Sydney Ice Dogs	Macquarie Ice Rink
19	20 Apr 2024	17:15	Brisbane Lightning	5–2	Canberra Brave	Phillip Ice Skating Centre
20	21 Apr 2024	14:00	Perth Thunder	3–7	Melbourne Ice	O’Brien Icehouse
21	21 Apr 2024	16:00	Adelaide Adrenaline	3–4 (OT)	Newcastle Northstars	Hunter Ice Skating Stadium
22	21 Apr 2024	16:45	Brisbane Lightning	5–2	Canberra Brave	Phillip Ice Skating Centre
23	26 Apr 2024	19:30	Melbourne Mustangs	2–5	Melbourne Ice	O’Brien Icehouse
24	27 Apr 2024	16:30	Adelaide Adrenaline	0–1	Perth Thunder	Perth Ice Arena
25	27 Apr 2024	16:45	Central Coast Rhinos	1–2 (OT)	Brisbane Lightning	Iceworld Boondall
26	27 Apr 2024	17:00	Sydney Bears	9–7	Melbourne Mustangs	O’Brien Icehouse
27	27 Apr 2024	17:15	Newcastle Northstars	6–2	Canberra Brave	Phillip Ice Skating Centre
28	28 Apr 2024	14:00	Sydney Bears	2–4	Melbourne Ice	O’Brien Icehouse
29	28 Apr 2024	15:45	Central Coast Rhinos	5–2	Brisbane Lightning	Iceworld Boondall
30	28 Apr 2024	16:00	Sydney Ice Dogs	6–5 (SO)	Newcastle Northstars	Hunter Ice Skating Stadium

==== May ====
May
Game #	Date	Time	Away	Score	Home	Location	Recap
31	4 May 2024	15:30	Sydney Ice Dogs	7–4	Central Coast Rhinos	Erina Ice Arena
32	4 May 2024	17:00	Melbourne Mustangs	6–5 (OT)	Newcastle Northstars	Hunter Ice Skating Stadium
33	4 May 2024	17:00	Adelaide Adrenaline	2–3	Sydney Bears	Macquarie Ice Rink
34	4 May 2024	17:15	Melbourne Ice	4–3 (SO)	Canberra Brave	Phillip Ice Skating Centre
35	5 May 2024	15:30	Adelaide Adrenaline	0–1 (SO)	Central Coast Rhinos	Erina Ice Arena
36	5 May 2024	16:00	Sydney Bears	9–2	Newcastle Northstars	Hunter Ice Skating Stadium
37	5 May 2024	16:45	Melbourne Ice	3–1	Canberra Brave	Phillip Ice Skating Centre
38	5 May 2024	17:00	Melbourne Mustangs	2–5	Sydney Ice Dogs	Macquarie Ice Rink
39	11 May 2024	16:30	Melbourne Mustangs	7–2	Adelaide Adrenaline	Adelaide Ice Arena
40	11 May 2024	16:30	Central Coast Rhinos	3–9	Perth Thunder	Perth Ice Arena
41	11 May 2024	16:45	Sydney Bears	4–1	Brisbane Lightning	Iceworld Boondall
42	11 May 2024	17:00	Canberra Brave	2–4	Melbourne Ice	O’Brien Icehouse
43	11 May 2024	17:00	Newcastle Northstars	4–3	Sydney Ice Dogs	Macquarie Ice Rink
44	12 May 2024	14:00	Canberra Brave	3–4	Melbourne Mustangs	O’Brien Icehouse
45	12 May 2024	15:45	Sydney Bears	8–1	Brisbane Lightning	Iceworld Boondall
46	18 May 2024	16:30	Canberra Brave	7–6 (SO)	Adelaide Adrenaline	Adelaide Ice Arena
47	18 May 2024	16:30	Melbourne Ice	4–0	Perth Thunder	Perth Ice Arena
48	18 May 2024	17:00	Brisbane Lightning	1–9	Newcastle Northstars	Hunter Ice Skating Stadium
49	18 May 2024	17:00	Central Coast Rhinos	5–3	Melbourne Mustangs	O’Brien Icehouse
50	18 May 2024	17:00	Sydney Bears	4–3	Sydney Ice Dogs	Macquarie Ice Rink
51	19 May 2024	14:00	Central Coast Rhinos	1–14	Melbourne Mustangs	O’Brien Icehouse
52	19 May 2024	16:30	Melbourne Ice	5–6	Perth Thunder	Perth Ice Arena
53	19 May 2024	17:00	Brisbane Lightning	6–9	Sydney Bears	Macquarie Ice Rink
54	19 May 2024	17:00	Canberra Brave	4–1	Adelaide Adrenaline	Adelaide Ice Arena
55	25 May 2024	13:00	Adelaide Adrenaline	2–5	Melbourne Mustangs	O’Brien Icehouse
56	25 May 2024	15:30	Sydney Bears	4–3	Central Coast Rhinos	Erina Ice Arena
57	25 May 2024	17:00	Canberra Brave	2–4	Newcastle Northstars	Hunter Ice Skating Stadium
58	25 May 2024	17:00	Brisbane Lightning	1–6	Melbourne Ice	O’Brien Icehouse
59	25 May 2024	17:00	Perth Thunder	8–2	Sydney Ice Dogs	Macquarie Ice Rink
60	26 May 2024	13:00	Adelaide Adrenaline	3–6	Melbourne Ice	O’Brien Icehouse
61	26 May 2024	15:30	Perth Thunder	4–3	Central Coast Rhinos	Erina Ice Arena
62	26 May 2024	16:45	Sydney Ice Dogs	1–5	Canberra Brave	Phillip Ice Skating Centre
63	26 May 2024	17:00	Brisbane Lightning	2–1	Melbourne Mustangs	O’Brien Icehouse
64	26 May 2024	17:00	Newcastle Northstars	1–6	Sydney Bears	Macquarie Ice Rink

==== June ====
June
Game #	Date	Time	Away	Score	Home	Location	Recap
65	1 Jun 2024	16:30	Newcastle Northstars	2–4	Perth Thunder	Perth Ice Arena
66	1 Jun 2024	16:45	Melbourne Mustangs	1–4	Brisbane Lightning	Iceworld Boondall
67	1 Jun 2024	17:00	Melbourne Ice	6–3	Sydney Ice Dogs	Macquarie Ice Rink
68	1 Jun 2024	17:15	Sydney Bears	3–5	Canberra Brave	Phillip Ice Skating Centre
69	2 Jun 2024	15:30	Melbourne Ice	4–3 (OT)	Central Coast Rhinos	Erina Ice Arena
70	2 Jun 2024	16:30	Newcastle Northstars	2–3 (SO)	Perth Thunder	Perth Ice Arena
71	2 Jun 2024	17:00	Melbourne Mustangs	2–6	Sydney Bears	Macquarie Ice Rink
72	8 Jun 2024	16:30	Central Coast Rhinos	1–2	Adelaide Adrenaline	Adelaide Ice Arena
73	8 Jun 2024	16:45	Sydney Ice Dogs	6–5 (OT)	Brisbane Lightning	Iceworld Boondall
74	8 Jun 2024	17:00	Melbourne Ice	7–1	Newcastle Northstars	Hunter Ice Skating Stadium
75	8 Jun 2024	17:00	Perth Thunder	2–4	Sydney Bears	Macquarie Ice Rink
76	8 Jun 2024	17:15	Melbourne Mustangs	5–2	Canberra Brave	Phillip Ice Skating Centre
77	9 Jun 2024	16:00	Perth Thunder	2–1 (OT)	Newcastle Northstars	Hunter Ice Skating Stadium
78	9 Jun 2024	16:15	Central Coast Rhinos	2–6	Adelaide Adrenaline	Adelaide Ice Arena
79	9 Jun 2024	16:45	Melbourne Mustangs	2–6	Canberra Brave	Phillip Ice Skating Centre
80	9 Jun 2024	17:00	Melbourne Ice	6–7 (OT)	Sydney Bears	Macquarie Ice Rink
81	14 Jun 2024	19:30	Melbourne Ice	3–5	Melbourne Mustangs	O’Brien Icehouse
82	15 Jun 2024	15:30	Canberra Brave	11–4	Central Coast Rhinos	Erina Ice Arena
83	15 Jun 2024	16:30	Perth Thunder	3–2 (SO)	Adelaide Adrenaline	Adelaide Ice Arena
84	15 Jun 2024	17:00	Sydney Ice Dogs	4–6	Melbourne Ice	O’Brien Icehouse
85	15 Jun 2024	17:00	Newcastle Northstars	3–8	Sydney Bears	Macquarie Ice Rink
86	16 Jun 2024	14:00	Sydney Ice Dogs	3–6	Melbourne Mustangs	O’Brien Icehouse
87	16 Jun 2024	16:00	Central Coast Rhinos	3–4	Newcastle Northstars	Hunter Ice Skating Stadium
88	16 Jun 2024	16:15	Perth Thunder	1–3	Adelaide Adrenaline	Adelaide Ice Arena
89	21 Jun 2024	19:30	Sydney Ice Dogs	5–7	Sydney Bears	Macquarie Ice Rink
90	22 Jun 2024	16:30	Melbourne Ice	5–1	Adelaide Adrenaline	Adelaide Ice Arena
91	22 Jun 2024	16:45	Newcastle Northstars	4–5 (OT)	Brisbane Lightning	Iceworld Boondall
92	22 Jun 2024	17:00	Melbourne Mustangs	2–3	Sydney Bears	Macquarie Ice Rink
93	22 Jun 2024	17:15	Perth Thunder	3–2 (OT)	Canberra Brave	Phillip Ice Skating Centre
94	23 Jun 2024	15:45	Newcastle Northstars	5–1	Brisbane Lightning	Iceworld Boondall
95	23 Jun 2024	16:15	Melbourne Ice	7–4	Adelaide Adrenaline	Adelaide Ice Arena
96	23 Jun 2024	17:00	Melbourne Mustangs	3–5	Sydney Ice Dogs	Macquarie Ice Rink
97	28 Jun 2024	19:30	Melbourne Mustangs	7–3	Melbourne Ice	O’Brien Icehouse
98	29 Jun 2024	15:30	Brisbane Lightning	3–6	Central Coast Rhinos	Erina Ice Arena
99	29 Jun 2024	17:00	Sydney Bears	9–6	Melbourne Ice	O’Brien Icehouse
100	29 Jun 2024	17:00	Adelaide Adrenaline	1–3	Sydney Ice Dogs	Macquarie Ice Rink
101	29 Jun 2024	17:15	Newcastle Northstars	3–7	Canberra Brave	Phillip Ice Skating Centre
102	30 Jun 2024	14:00	Sydney Bears	3–2	Melbourne Mustangs	O’Brien Icehouse
103	30 Jun 2024	15:15	Brisbane Lightning	2–3	Newcastle Northstars	Hunter Ice Skating Stadium
104	30 Jun 2024	15:30	Adelaide Adrenaline	2–4	Central Coast Rhinos	Erina Ice Arena
105	30 Jun 2024	17:00	Canberra Brave	6–3	Sydney Ice Dogs	Macquarie Ice Rink

==== July ====
July
Game #	Date	Time	Away	Score	Home	Location	Recap
106	6 Jul 2024	16:30	Newcastle Northstars	4–3 (OT)	Adelaide Adrenaline	Adelaide Ice Arena
107	6 Jul 2024	16:30	Sydney Ice Dogs	4–5 (OT)	Perth Thunder	Perth Ice Arena
108	6 Jul 2024	16:45	Canberra Brave	6–4	Brisbane Lightning	Iceworld Boondall
109	6 Jul 2024	17:00	Central Coast Rhinos	5–4 (SO)	Sydney Bears	Macquarie Ice Rink
110	7 Jul 2024	15:45	Canberra Brave	1–2 (SO)	Brisbane Lightning	Iceworld Boondall
111	7 Jul 2024	16:15	Newcastle Northstars	2–3 (SO)	Adelaide Adrenaline	Adelaide Ice Arena
112	7 Jul 2024	16:30	Sydney Ice Dogs	2–5	Perth Thunder	Perth Ice Arena
113	13 Jul 2024	16:30	Melbourne Mustangs	3–5	Perth Thunder	Perth Ice Arena
114	13 Jul 2024	16:45	Melbourne Ice	3–5	Brisbane Lightning	Iceworld Boondall
115	13 Jul 2024	17:00	Adelaide Adrenaline	3–2 (SO)	Newcastle Northstars	Hunter Ice Skating Stadium
116	13 Jul 2024	17:00	Central Coast Rhinos	3–6	Sydney Ice Dogs	Macquarie Ice Rink
117	14 Jul 2024	16:30	Melbourne Mustangs	3–6	Perth Thunder	Perth Ice Arena
118	14 Jul 2024	16:45	Central Coast Rhinos	2–7	Canberra Brave	Phillip Ice Skating Centre
119	14 Jul 2024	17:00	Adelaide Adrenaline	2–4	Sydney Bears	Macquarie Ice Rink
120	19 Jul 2024	19:30	Melbourne Ice	2–9	Melbourne Mustangs	O’Brien Icehouse
121	20 Jul 2024	15:30	Canberra Brave	6–1	Central Coast Rhinos	Erina Ice Arena
122	20 Jul 2024	16:30	Brisbane Lightning	4–1	Adelaide Adrenaline	Adelaide Ice Arena
123	20 Jul 2024	17:00	Newcastle Northstars	1–5	Melbourne Mustangs	O’Brien Icehouse
124	20 Jul 2024	17:00	Perth Thunder	6–2	Sydney Ice Dogs	Macquarie Ice Rink
125	21 Jul 2024	14:00	Newcastle Northstars	4–3 (OT)	Melbourne Ice	O’Brien Icehouse
126	21 Jul 2024	16:15	Brisbane Lightning	0–3	Adelaide Adrenaline	Adelaide Ice Arena
127	21 Jul 2024	17:00	Perth Thunder	6–3	Sydney Bears	Macquarie Ice Rink
128	27 Jul 2024	15:30	Brisbane Lightning	1–0	Central Coast Rhinos	Erina Ice Arena
129	27 Jul 2024	16:30	Sydney Ice Dogs	5–2	Adelaide Adrenaline	Adelaide Ice Arena
130	27 Jul 2024	17:00	Perth Thunder	1–5	Melbourne Ice	O’Brien Icehouse
131	27 Jul 2024	17:00	Canberra Brave	6–4	Sydney Bears	Macquarie Ice Rink
132	28 Jul 2024	14:00	Perth Thunder	4–5 (OT)	Melbourne Mustangs	O’Brien Icehouse
133	28 Jul 2024	16:00	Central Coast Rhinos	0–3	Newcastle Northstars	Hunter Ice Skating Stadium
134	28 Jul 2024	17:00	Brisbane Lightning	1–4	Sydney Ice Dogs	Macquarie Ice Rink

==== August ====
August
Game #	Date	Time	Away	Score	Home	Location	Recap
135	3 Aug 2024	16:30	Sydney Bears	5–3	Perth Thunder	Perth Ice Arena
136	3 Aug 2024	16:45	Adelaide Adrenaline	4–5	Brisbane Lightning	IceWorld Boondall
137	3 Aug 2024	17:00	Sydney Ice Dogs	4–6	Melbourne Mustangs	O’Brien Icehouse
138	3 Aug 2024	17:15	Central Coast Rhinos	2–7	Canberra Brave	Phillip Ice Skating Centre
139	4 Aug 2024	14:00	Sydney Ice Dogs	2–9	Melbourne Ice	O’Brien Icehouse
140	4 Aug 2024	15:30	Newcastle Northstars	3–2	Central Coast Rhinos	Erina Ice Arena
141	4 Aug 2024	15:45	Adelaide Adrenaline	1–2 (SO)	Brisbane Lightning	IceWorld Boondall
142	4 Aug 2024	16:30	Sydney Bears	7–2	Perth Thunder	Perth Ice Arena
143	10 Aug 2024	15:30	Sydney Ice Dogs	9–5	Central Coast Rhinos	Erina Ice Arena
144	10 Aug 2024	16:30	Brisbane Lightning	0–6	Perth Thunder	Perth Ice Arena
145	10 Aug 2024	17:00	Melbourne Mustangs	2–9	Newcastle Northstars	Hunter Ice Skating Stadium
146	10 Aug 2024	17:00	Melbourne Ice	4–5	Sydney Bears	Macquarie Ice Rink
147	10 Aug 2024	17:15	Adelaide Adrenaline	2–3	Canberra Brave	Phillip Ice Skating Centre
148	11 Aug 2024	15:30	Melbourne Mustangs	5–6 (OT)	Central Coast Rhinos	Erina Ice Arena
149	11 Aug 2024	16:45	Adelaide Adrenaline	1–6	Canberra Brave	Phillip Ice Skating Centre
150	11 Aug 2024	17:00	Melbourne Ice	2–3 (SO)	Sydney Ice Dogs	Macquarie Ice Rink

Key:

Winner

=== Standings ===
==== Overall ====
Pos	Team	Pld	W	OTW	OTL	L	GF	GA	GD	Pts	Qualification or relegation
1	Sydney Bears	30	23	1	1	5	166	103	+63	72	2024 Goodall Cup Finals
2	Melbourne Ice	30	18	2	3	7	154	99	+55	58	2024 Goodall Cup Finals
3	Perth Thunder	30	15	5	1	9	124	98	+26	53	2024 Goodall Cup Finals
4	Newcastle Northstars	30	13	3	7	7	124	108	+16	52	2024 Goodall Cup Finals
5	Canberra Brave	30	15	1	3	11	128	105	+23	50	2024 Goodall Cup Finals
6	Melbourne Mustangs	30	13	2	1	14	136	120	+16	44	
7	Brisbane Lightning	30	9	4	1	16	85	124	−39	36	2024 Goodall Cup Finals
8	Sydney Ice Dogs	30	9	3	1	17	112	145	−33	34	
9	Adelaide Adrenaline	30	5	2	6	17	70	108	−38	25	
10	Central Coast Rhinos	30	4	3	2	21	81	170	−89	20	

Source: AIHL Elite Prospects
Rules for classification:
Tie-break: 1) points; 2) points percentage; 3) head to head; 4) goal difference; 5) goals scored; 6) coin toss
Points: 3 points for regulation win; 2 points for OT or SO win; 1 point for OT or SO loss; 0 points for regulation loss
Note: Melbourne Ice and Perth Thunder were both deducted 3 points by the league for breaching player cap regulations.

==== Hellyer Conference ====
Pos	Team	Pld	W	OTW	OTL	L	GF	GA	GD	Pts	Qualification or relegation
1	Sydney Bears	30	23	1	1	5	166	103	+63	72	2024 Goodall Cup Finals
2	Melbourne Ice	30	18	2	3	7	154	99	+55	58	2024 Goodall Cup Finals
3	Perth Thunder	30	15	5	1	9	124	98	+26	53	2024 Goodall Cup Finals
4	Melbourne Mustangs	30	13	2	1	14	136	120	+16	44	
5	Sydney Ice Dogs	30	9	3	1	17	112	145	−33	34	

Source: AIHL Elite Prospects
Rules for classification:
Tie-break: 1) points; 2) points percentage; 3) head to head; 4) goal difference; 5) goals scored; 6) coin toss
Points: 3 points for regulation win; 2 points for OT or SO win; 1 point for OT or SO loss; 0 points for regulation loss
Note: Melbourne Ice and Perth Thunder were both deducted 3 points by the league for breaching player cap regulations.

==== Rurak Conference ====
Pos	Team	Pld	W	OTW	OTL	L	GF	GA	GD	Pts	Qualification or relegation
1	Newcastle Northstars	30	13	3	7	7	124	108	+16	52	2024 Goodall Cup Finals
2	Canberra Brave	30	15	1	3	11	128	105	+23	50	2024 Goodall Cup Finals
3	Brisbane Lightning	30	9	4	1	16	85	124	−39	36	2024 Goodall Cup Finals
4	Adelaide Adrenaline	30	5	2	6	17	70	108	−38	25	
5	Central Coast Rhinos	30	4	3	2	21	81	170	−89	20	

Source: AIHL Elite Prospects
Rules for classification:
Tie-break: 1) points; 2) points percentage; 3) head to head; 4) goal difference; 5) goals scored; 6) coin toss
Points: 3 points for regulation win; 2 points for OT or SO win; 1 point for OT or SO loss; 0 points for regulation loss

=== Statistics ===
==== Skater statistics ====
2024 AIHL season top-ten skater statistics for points, goals, assists and penalty minutes.

Points
#	Name	Team	Pos	Pts
1	(United States) Adam Kadlec	SB	F	70
2	(United States) Austin Albrecht	MI	F	68
3	(United States) Lucas Herrmann	SB	F	66
4	(Canada) Francis Drolet	NN	F	62
5	(Canada) Scott Timmins	MM	F	61
6	(Canada) Alex Macdonald	SD	F	58
7	(Canada) Mackenzie Caruana	MI	F	56
8	(United States) Austin Cangelosi	CB	F	53
9	(Canada) Grant Toulmin	SD	F	52
10	(Canada) Daniel Berno	NN	F	46

Goals
#	Name	Team	Pos	G
1	(United States) Adam Kadlec	SB	F	32
2	(Canada) Alex Macdonald	SD	F	29
3	(United States) Austin Albrecht	MI	F	26
4	(Canada) Francis Drolet	NN	F	24
5	(Canada) Scott Timmins	MM	F	24
6	(United States) Austin Cangelosi	CB	F	24
7	(Canada) Kaden Elder	AA	F	24
8	(Canada) Brody Lindal	SB	F	23
9	(United States) Lucas Herrmann	SB	F	22
10	(Canada) Mackenzie Caruana	MI	F	22

Assists
#	Name	Team	Pos	A
1	(United States) Lucas Herrmann	SB	F	44
2	(United States) Austin Albrecht	MI	F	42
3	(United States) Adam Kadlec	SB	F	38
4	(Canada) Francis Drolet	NN	F	38
5	(Canada) Scott Timmins	MM	F	37
6	(Canada) Grant Toulmin	SD	F	37
7	(Canada) Mackenzie Caruana	MI	F	34
8	(Canada) Josh Adkins	AA	F	34
9	(Australia) Ryan Annesley	SB	D	33
10	(Canada) Alex Macdonald	SD	F	29

Penalty minutes
#	Name	Team	Pos	PIM
1	(Australia) Alastair Punler	PT	D	145
2	(Australia) Hamish Powell	NN	F	80
3	(Canada) Johnny Aonso	MI	D	71
4	(Hungary) Patrik Popovics	BL	F	68
5	(Netherlands) Mike Dalhuisen	SD	D	65
6	(Australia) Sacha Rapchuk	BL	F	63
7	(Australia) Bradley Apps	MM	F	61
8	(Canada) Daniel Berno	NN	F	55
9	(Australia) Mackenzie Bolger	CR	F	55
10	(Australia) Lliam Webster	MI	D	53

==== Goaltender statistics ====
2024 AIHL season top-ten^{1} goaltender statistics for goals against average and save percentage.

^{1} only goaltenders who have played 10 or more games qualify for these lists

Goals against average
#	Name	Team	Pos	GAA
1	(Australia) Aleksi Toivonen	CB	G	2.79
2	(Japan) Tatsunoshin Ishida	MI	G	2.81
3	(Canada) Rylan Toth	AA	G	2.92
4	(France) Léo Bertein	PT	G	2.93
5	(Australia) James Downie	SB	G	3.09
6	(Australia) Charles Smart	NN	G	3.42
7	(Canada) Logan Flodell	MM	G	3.58
8	(Australia) Alex Tétreault	CB	G	3.66
9	(Australia) Anthony Kimlin	SB	G	3.80
10	(Canada) Curtis Meger	BL	G	3.84

Save percentage
#	Name	Team	Pos	SV%
1	(Japan) Tatsunoshin Ishida	MI	G	.920
2	(France) Léo Bertein	PT	G	.914
3	(Canada) Logan Flodell	MM	G	.908
4	(Canada) Rylan Toth	AA	G	.906
5	(Australia) Aleksi Toivonen	CB	G	.905
6	(Australia) James Downie	SB	G	.905
7	(Canada) Anand Oberoi	CR	G	.897
8	(Canada) Curtis Meger	BL	G	.896
9	(Sweden) Arvid Ljung	SD	G	.893
10	(Australia) Alex Tétreault	CB	G	.892

=== Awards ===
==== Skaters Network player of the week ====
Each week the AIHL, through sponsorship, names a player of the week.
The award is based on the following criteria:

- individual performance, including significant game statistics;
- contribution to the team's success through individual leadership abilities; and
- performance off the ice, including community engagement.

Round	Awarded to	Pos	Ref
1	(Australia) Joey Hughes	F	Ref
2	(Australia) Wehebe Darge	F	Ref
3	(Australia) Noah Moncrieff	F	Ref
4	(Australia) Dmitri Kuleshov	F	Ref
5	(Australia) Dmitri Kuleshov	F	Ref
6	(Australia) Jamie Bourke	F	Ref
7	(Australia) Casey Kubara	F	Ref
8	(Australia) Kieren Webster	F	Ref
9	(Australia) Robert Haselhurst	D	Ref
10	(Australia) Daniel Chen	F	Ref
11	(Australia) Beau Taylor	F	Ref
12	(Australia) Ethan Hawes	D	Ref
13	(Australia) Mackenzie Bolger	F	Ref
14	(Australia) Robert Haselhurst	D	Ref
15	(Australia) Alexander Wardlaw	F	Ref
16	(Australia) Jordan Kyros	F	Ref
17	(Australia) Charlie Smart	G	Ref
18	(Australia) Julian Fodor	F	Ref
19	(Australia) Dillon Dewar	G	Ref

==== Season awards ====
Below lists the 2024 AIHL season award winners.

Award	Name	Team
MVP	(Canada) Kaden Elder	Adelaide Adrenaline
Goaltender	(Canada) Rylan Toth	Adelaide Adrenaline
Defenceman	(Australia) Ryan Annesley	Sydney Bears
Local	(Australia) Robert Haselhurst	Perth Thunder
Rookie	(Australia) Daniel Koudelka	Adelaide Adrenaline
Coach	(Australia) Jason Kvisle	Sydney Ice Dogs
Finals MVP	(New Zealand) Jake Ratcliffe	Canberra Brave

== Goodall Cup playoffs ==
For season 2024, the AIHL adopted another new Finals format not previously used by the league. Six teams will qualify, three from each conference, to play five games in three days. Winners of the two conferences will begin on Day 2 in the semi-finals, with the other four teams entering the preliminary-finals on Day 1. AIHL Finals uses single-game elimination with winning teams advancing to the next round and losing teams eliminated. Melbourne's O'Brien Icehouse will host Finals once again for the 11th time. Finals winners are crowned AIHL Champions and claim the historic Goodall Cup. Man of the match in the grand final is named AIHL Finals MVP.

The Sydney Bears and Newcastle Northstars topped the Hellyer and Rurak conferences to qualify straight to the semi-finals. Melbourne Ice, Perth Thunder, Canberra Brave and Brisbane Lightning qualified for the preliminary-finals by finishing second and third in their respective conferences. The Ice and Brave won on Day 1 to progress to the semi-finals, with Lightning and Thunder knocked-out. Japanese goaltender, Tatsunoshin Ishida, securing a shutout for the Ice. The Ice and Brave then both won on Day 2 to progress to the Grand Final to compete for the Goodall Cup. Knocking out the Bears and Northstars respectively. The Brave defeated the Ice in the grand final to claim the team's third Goodall Cup and AIHL Championship title. Alex Tétreault securing his first shutout of the season for the Brave. It was the second grand final in a row to have a shutout.

Preliminary-finals
23 August – Melbourne
Melbourne Ice	5
Brisbane Lightning	0
23 August – Melbourne
Perth Thunder	1
Canberra Brave	2

Semi-finals
24 August – Melbourne
Sydney Bears	2
Canberra Brave	5
24 August – Melbourne
Newcastle Northstars	3
Melbourne Ice	4

Grand final
25 August – Melbourne
Canberra Brave	5
Melbourne Ice	0

All times are UTC+10:00

=== Preliminary-finals ===
23 August 2024; 15:00	Brisbane Lightning	0–5 (0–3, 0–1, 0–1)	Melbourne Ice	O’Brien Icehouse

Game reference

(Canada) Curtis Meger
Goalies
(Japan) Tatsunoshin Ishida
Referees:
Nick Air
Joey Theriault
Linesmen:
Darren Lampard
Jake O'Brien

0 – 1	Kraemer (Caruana, Albrecht)
0 – 2	J.Lake (Webster, Caruana)
0 – 3	Hughes (Albrecht, Caruana)
0 – 4	Aonso (Bourke, Webster)
0 – 5	Kraemer (Caruana, Albrecht)

14 min
Penalties
14 min
19
Shots
48

23 August 2024; 19:00	Perth Thunder	1–2 (0–1, 1–0, 0–1)	Canberra Brave	O’Brien Icehouse

Game reference

(Canada) Leo Bertein
Goalies
(Australia) Aleksi Toivonen
Referees:
David Gal
Casper Russelhuber
Linesmen:
David Rehak
Russell Dow

	0 – 1	B.Kubara (Clark, Ratcliffe)
(Haselhurst, Vertes) Addison	1 – 1
	1 – 2	Clark (C.Kubara, Cangelosi)

6 min
Penalties
6 min
41
Shots
29

=== Semi-finals ===
24 August 2024; 14:00	Canberra Brave	5–2 (0–0, 3–0, 2–2)	Sydney Bears	O’Brien Icehouse

Game reference

(Australia) Alex Tetreault
Goalies
(Australia) Anthony Kimlin
Referees:
Joey Theriault
Casper Russelhuber
Linesmen:
David Rehak
Jake O'Brien

(Unassisted) Maylan	1 – 0
(Harvey, Ratcliffe) Cangelosi	2 – 0
(B.Kubara, Cangelosi) T.Kubara	3 – 0
(Ratcliffe, Harvey) Cangelosi	4 – 0
	4 – 1	Herrmann (Brücker)
	4 – 2	Landa (Herrmann, Kushneriuk)
(Maylan) Clark	5 – 2

6 min
Penalties
8 min
31
Shots
44

24 August 2024; 18:00	Melbourne Ice	4–3 (1–2, 0–1, 3–0)	Newcastle Northstars	O’Brien Icehouse

Game reference

(Japan) Tatsunoshin Ishida
Goalies
(Australia) Charlie Smart
Referees:
Nick Air
David Gal
Linesmen:
Russell Dow
Darren Lampard

(Solow, Caruana) Kraemer	1 – 0
	1 – 1	Berno (Klugerman, Hawes)
	1 – 2	Klugerman (Hawes)
	1 – 3	Darge (Ellen)
(Albrecht) Kraemer	2 – 3
(Albrecht) Solow	3 – 3
(Kraemer, Albrecht) Cincotta	4 – 3

14 min
Penalties
26 min
43
Shots
31

=== Final ===
25 August 2024; 14:00	Melbourne Ice	0–5 (0–0, 0–5, 0–0)	Canberra Brave	O’Brien Icehouse

Game reference

(Japan) Tatsunoshin Ishida
Goalies
(Australia) Alex Tetreault
Referees:
David Gal
Joey Theriault
Linesmen:
David Rehak
Jake O'Brien

0 – 1	Ratcliffe (C.Kubara, Clark)
0 – 2	Harvey (T.Kubara)
0 – 3	C.Kubara (Ratcliffe, Cangelosi)
0 – 4	C.Kubara (Ratcliffe, Cangelosi)
0 – 5	Ratcliffe (B.Kubara, C.Kubara)

20 min
Penalties
14 min
29
Shots
33
