= Ice Hockey Queensland =

- Sport: Ice hockey
- Jurisdiction: Queensland
- Abbreviation: IHQ
- Founded: 1960
- Affiliation: Ice Hockey Australia

Official website
- www.ihq.org.au
- (Australia)
- (Queensland)

The Ice Hockey Queensland, currently trading as Ice Hockey Q is the governing body of ice hockey in Queensland, Australia. The Ice Hockey Queensland is a branch of Ice Hockey Australia.

== History ==
=== Queensland's first ice rink ===
To build the first ice skating venue for Queensland saw failed attempts and proposals, dating back to 1938, with the proposal of an ice skating rink on Wickham Street, Brisbane. The proposal was submitted by C. V. E. Mitchell for a dual purpose venue that would hold ice skating during the winter season and roller skating during the summer season. A few months later the Brisbane Ice Skating Palais Ltd. was established on 5 November 1938 with the new rink expected to open on 1 May 1939. Closer to the proposed opening date for the ice rink, it was announced that the development plans for the proposed new ice skating rink were under reconstruction and details could not be given on 17 February 1939.

The first ice skating rink built in Queensland was proposed by Sir Oswald Stoll and built by an English refrigeration engineer, Mr. C. N. Pugh, who arrived on Friday 17 November 1939 along with 4 engineers to construct the rink as part of a traveling show in His Majesty's Theatre in Brisbane. The show was a production called Switzerland, which had traveled through England and Africa with these same engineers and equipment. This rink was not a public ice skating rink and was only used for the season for the production where champion ice skaters Phil Taylor and Megan Taylor headlined.

In 1947, secretary of the Queensland branch of the Pedal Cyclists' Association, Les Cecil proposed a dual purpose venue as a solution which would see cycling in the summer season on a removable floor so that ice skating could be enjoyed when the floor was removed for the winter season.

In 1953 a construction engineer named Mr. W. J. Newton was to finish plans for 3 pools to be built on his land opposite the Mount Gravatt showgrounds. The proposal was to include an Olympic swimming pool, Olympic diving pool and a shallow children's pool. To also be built near the pools were 4 tennis courts, mini golf course and an ice skating rink.

The first public ice rink in Queensland was Mowbray Park Ice Rink which opened in 1958 and it was here that ice hockey began for Queensland. The rink was built in the former Mowbray Park Picture Palace and lasted 7 seasons until it closed in 1967.

=== Queensland Hockey ===
According to Ice Hockey Queensland:

- Queensland ice hockey was established in 1960 with the opening of the Mowbray Park Ice Rink in Kangaroo Point near Mowbray Park which is now East Brisbane. Mowbray Park Ice Rink lasted until 1967. Hockey in Queensland continued with the opening of the Four Seasons Ice Palace at Toombul in 1971 and operated until 1985. Iceworld Acacia Ridge opened in 1979 followed by Iceworld Boondall 10 years later in 1989.

Ice Hockey Queensland currently sanctions three national league teams (Brisbane Lightning Women in the Australian Women’s Ice Hockey League, Brisbane Lightning in the Australian Ice Hockey League, and Brisbane Blitz in the Australian Junior Ice Hockey League) and four clubs (Southern Stars, Brisbane Buccaneers, Gold Coast Grizzlies and Northern Lightning). The Brisbane Lightning Women started as the Brisbane Goannas, one of the original AWIHL teams in 2007.

== National Competition ==
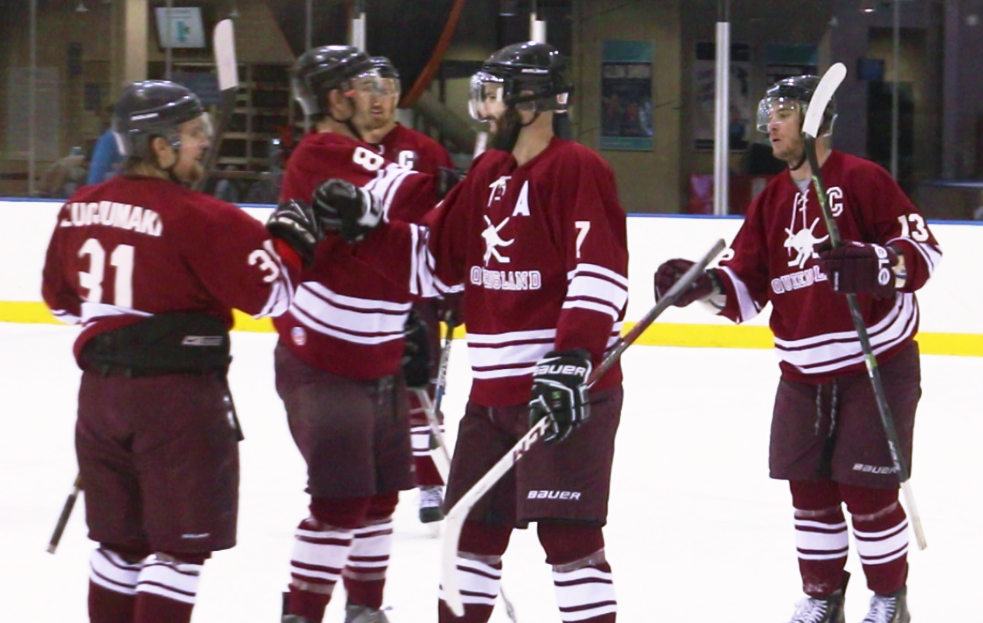
Queensland during the 2015 Brown Tournament

=== Goodall Cup ===
In 1977, Queensland won their first Goodall Cup and were the first state to win the Goodall Cup other than Victoria and New South Wales since the inaugural inter-state competition in 1909.

=== Boxall Women's National Championship ===
In 2024, the Queensland Women's team took the gold medal at the Stephanie Boxall Women's National Championship in Newcastle, NSW.

== Leagues ==
- Brisbane United Ice Hockey League features teams from the Southern Stars and Brisbane Buccaneers with teams competing in six different divisions based on skill level. The Gold Coast Grizzlys play at Ice Land, Bundall.
- SuperLeague – The top senior league in Queensland
- Senior Division I – Non Checking Adult League
- Senior Division II – Non Checking Adult League Division 2
- Senior Division III
- Senior Division IV
- Senior Division V - Non Checking development league

The QJIHL (Queensland Junior Ice Hockey League) includes:

- U18 – junior league open to players 18 and under (checking)
- U15 - junior league open to players 15 and under (checking)
- U13 – junior league open to players 13 and under
- U11 - junior league open to players 11 and under
- U9 - junior league open to players 9 and under

== Uniform and Logos ==
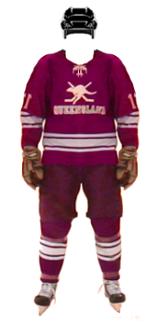
2015 Queensland home uniform.

== Presidents ==
- 1988 - Dr. Kelly Armatage
- 2022 - Matthew Meyer
- 2023 - Tim Lilly

== See also ==
- Ice Hockey Australia
- Australian Women's Ice Hockey League
- Australian Junior Ice Hockey League
