= 2023 AIHL season =

- League: Australian Ice Hockey League
- Sport: Ice hockey
- Duration: 15 April 2023 – 13 August 2023

Regular season
- H Newman Reid Trophy: CBR Brave (4th title)
- Top scorer: Scott Timmins (82 points) (Melbourne Mustangs)

Goodall Cup
- Champions: Melbourne Mustangs (2nd title)
- Runners-up: CBR Brave
- Finals MVP: Liam Hughes (Mustangs)

AIHL seasons
- 2022 2024

The 2023 AIHL season was the 22nd season of the Australian Ice Hockey League (AIHL). The season consisted of 130 regular season games from 15 April to 13 August 2023, with the Goodall Cup finals consisting of two play-in matches, two semi-finals, and a grand final, following the regular season on 26–27 August 2023. The CBR Brave and Sydney Bears claimed the Rurak and Hellyer conference trophies for finishing top of their respective conference standings. The CBR Brave also won the Premiership and claimed the H Newman Reid Trophy for a record fourth consecutive time by finishing top of the regular season standings. The Melbourne Mustangs won the Championship and claimed the Goodall Cup for the second time in their history, defeating the Brave in the grand final. The returning Central Coast Rhinos claimed the wooden spoon.

== Teams ==
In 2023 the AIHL had 10 teams split into two conferences competing in the league.

2023 AIHL teams
Hellyer Conference
| Team | City | Arena | Head Coach | Captain |
|---|---|---|---|---|
| Melbourne Ice | (Victoria (state)) Melbourne | O'Brien Icehouse | (Canada) Kerry Goulet | (Australia) Mackenzie Caruana |
| Melbourne Mustangs | (Victoria (state)) Melbourne | O'Brien Icehouse | (United States) Pat McMahon | (Australia) Brendan McDowell |
| Perth Thunder | (Western Australia) Perth | Perth Ice Arena | (Canada) Benjamin Breault | (Australia) James Woodman |
| Sydney Bears | (New South Wales) Sydney | Macquarie Ice Rink | (Australia) Ron Kuprowsky | (Canada) Ryan Annesley |
| Sydney Ice Dogs | (New South Wales) Sydney | Macquarie Ice Rink | (Australia) Jason Kvisle | (Australia) Daniel Pataky |
Rurak Conference
| Team | City | Arena | Head Coach | Captain |
| Adelaide Adrenaline | (South Australia) Adelaide | IceArenA | (Australia) Stu Henly | (Canada) Joey MacDougall |
| Brisbane Lightning | (Queensland) Brisbane | Boondall Iceworld | (Australia) Terry Kiliwnik | (Australia) Damian Bright |
| CBR Brave | (Australian Capital Territory) Canberra | Phillip Ice Skating Centre | (Australia) Stuart Philps | (Australia) Kai Miettinen |
| Central Coast Rhinos | (New South Wales) Central Coast | Erina Ice Arena | (South Africa) Ashley Marsh | (Australia) Robert Malloy |
| Newcastle Northstars | (New South Wales) Newcastle | Hunter Ice Skating Stadium | (Canada) Kevin Noble | (Australia) Liam Manwarring |

== League Business ==
The 2023 regular season fixture list was released publicly by the AIHL on 2 November 2022. The AIHL Finals would be altered from 2022, moving to a two weekend format for the first time in league history. League trophies would continue to be consistent with previous seasons, with the league champion awarded the historic Goodall Cup and league premier awarded the H Newman Reid Trophy. The League confirmed that the Adelaide Adrenaline and Perth Thunder would be returning to the league for 2023, after both teams pulled out of competing in 2022. The Adrenaline had secured a new venue agreement with the IceArenA, paving the way for their return. While Western Australia no longer had any border restrictions, paving the way for the Thunder's return. A new paid subscription streaming service named AIHL.TV was introduced by the AIHL for season 2023. This marked the first time the league had ever brought in a paid streaming service for the regular season. All 130 regular season games and finals would be available live and on demand with yearly, monthly and weekly payment options.

=== Expansion ===
Following a successful 2022 exhibition schedule, the AIHL announced the Brisbane Lightning and Central Coast Rhinos had both been successful in obtaining full AIHL licences and would be officially joining the league and regular season for 2023. The two team expansion increased the league membership to ten teams for the first time, previously the highest membership number was nine teams in 2012.

During pre-season, there had been discussions about the possibility for the Brisbane Rampage to join the league following the collapse of the Pacific Hockey League, however the AIHL season schedule had already been organised and released publicly and season preparation had already advanced past the stage to accommodate a late addition. There was no public mention of exhibition games involving the Rampage and/or a pathway to obtaining a licence for the 2024 season.

=== Exhibition games ===
In the lead up to Season 2023, eight exhibition games were organised between different AIHL teams. The Mustangs and Ice organised a two-game series for February and March 2023. The second of these games doubled as a charity event for The Royal Children's Hospital Melbourne. The Mustangs, Ice, O'Brien Icehouse and The District Docklands raised $30,109 for the hospital's Good Friday Appeal. The Brave and Lightning arranged a three-game series to replace the missed series in August 2022 when the Brave pulled out due to preparations for the AIHL Finals. Two games would be played in Brisbane and one in Canberra. The Central Coast Rhinos lined up three pre-season games. One against the Sydney Bears at Erina Ice Arena and two against the Newcastle Northstars, one at Erina and one in Newcastle. In addition to the eight games, on 4 March 2023, the Melbourne Mustangs organised a delayed 10 year team anniversary reunion tournament involving current and former players, staff and supporters. The event saw 3 teams play in a round-robin tournament at O'Brien Icehouse.

2023 AIHL exhibition games
| Date | Time | Away | Score | Home | Location | Recap |
|---|---|---|---|---|---|---|
| 25 Feb 2023 | 17:00 | Melbourne Ice | 3–1 | Melbourne Mustangs | O'Brien Icehouse | Ref |
| 4 Mar 2023 | 17:30 | CBR Brave | 5–4 | Brisbane Lightning | Boondall Iceworld | Ref |
| 5 Mar 2023 | 16:30 | CBR Brave | 6–0 | Brisbane Lightning | Boondall Iceworld | Ref |
| 25 Mar 2023 | 15:30 | Sydney Bears | 12–0 | Central Coast Rhinos | Erina Ice Arena | Ref |
| 31 Mar 2023 | 19:30 | Melbourne Mustangs | 6–2 | Melbourne Ice | O'Brien Icehouse | Ref |
| 1 Apr 2023 | 17:15 | Brisbane Lightning | 5–6 | CBR Brave | Phillip Ice Skating Centre | Ref |
| 1 Apr 2023 | 15:30 | Newcastle Northstars | 6–4 | Central Coast Rhinos | Erina Ice Arena | Ref |
| 2 Apr 2023 | 16:00 | Central Coast Rhinos | 3–10 | Newcastle Northstars | Hunter Ice Skating Stadium | Ref |

=== Personnel changes ===
2023 team staff and coaching changes included: Sydney Ice Dogs appointing a new head coach, Jason Kvisle, and associate coach, Jimmy Dufour, after letting Czech coach, Ondrej Cervenka, leave the team. Melbourne Ice had a number of ins, outs and role changes at the team. Canadian Kerry Goulet was appointed head coach. Sandy Gardner moved from head coach to assistant coach and is joined by Michael Flaherty and the rejoining Brent Laver. Keira Dunwoody joins the Ice from the Melbourne Ducks and rounds out the coaching department. In other team position changes at the Ice, Marie-Bernadette La Rose left her role as marketing manager after four years with the team, while Erin Tempest and Trevor Dickson were appointed to the roles of Director Secretariate and Director of Hockey Operations respectively. Melbourne Mustangs confirmed last season's head coach, Canadian Chris Lawrence would be returning to the team in 2023, but on the playing roster, so the Mustangs replaced Lawrence with American Pat McMahon, who had previous experience with Victorian junior teams and the Melbourne Ducks in the PHL in 2022. Brisbane Lightning's admission into the AIHL brought with it early pre-season changes at the team. Peter Holmes joined the Lightning as general manager and governor, replacing the outgoing Josh Labrie (GM) and Matthew Meyer (governor). Ash Jackson was then brought into the team in December 2022 as the new Director of Marketing, Media and Publicity. Ash has previous marketing campaign experience with the 2022 FIBA Women's Basketball World Cup and overseen projects with the AFL, FIFA and the ICC. Melbourne Mustangs and head coach Patrick McMahon parted ways in July 2023 due to unforeseen circumstances that required him to travel home to America.

=== Player transfers ===
All player transfers by the ten AIHL teams for season 2023.

==== Interclub transfers ====
| Nat | Player | Previous team | New team |
|---|---|---|---|
| (Australia) | Steven Adams | Sydney Bears | Central Coast Rhinos |
| (Australia) | Zachary Boyle | Melbourne Ice | Adelaide Adrenaline |
| (Australia) | Jack Carpenter* | Melbourne Ice | Melbourne Mustangs |
| (Australia) | Wehebe Darge | CBR Brave | Newcastle Northstars |
| (Australia) | Greg Davis | Melbourne Ice | Perth Thunder |
| (Australia) | Luka Dimopoulos | Sydney Ice Dogs | Central Coast Rhinos |
| (Australia) | Patrik Dittrich* | Sydney Ice Dogs | Central Coast Rhinos |
| (Australia) | Nicholas Doornbos | CBR Brave | Sydney Ice Dogs |
| (Australia) | Alexander Dvinyaninov | Sydney Ice Dogs | Brisbane Lightning |
| (Australia) | Alexander Dvinyaninov* | Brisbane Lightning | Sydney Ice Dogs |
| (Australia) | Ryan Foll | Melbourne Ice | Adelaide Adrenaline |
| (Australia) | Glen Forbes-White | Sydney Bears | Brisbane Lightning |
| (Australia) | Robert Haselhurst | Sydney Bears | Perth Thunder |
| (Australia) | David-James Jeremy | Newcastle Northstars | Central Coast Rhinos |
| (Australia) | Adam Kimbley* | Sydney Bears | Central Coast Rhinos |
| (Australia) | Joshua Kleipas | Sydney Ice Dogs | Central Coast Rhinos |
| (Australia) | Mika Laajunen | Sydney Bears | Sydney Ice Dogs |
| (Australia) | Lynden Lodge | CBR Brave | Perth Thunder |
| (Australia) | Bryan Mackenzie | Melbourne Ice | Melbourne Mustangs |
| (Australia) | Robert Malloy | Newcastle Northstars | Central Coast Rhinos |
| (Australia) | Matt Nikitin | Melbourne Ice | Melbourne Mustangs |
| (Australia) | Matthew Price | CBR Brave | Newcastle Northstars |
| (Australia) | Alastair Punler | CBR Brave | Perth Thunder |
| (Australia) | Jake Riley* | Melbourne Ice | CBR Brave |
| (Australia) | Lukas Vaic | Sydney Ice Dogs | Sydney Bears |
| (Australia) | Aidan Wardlaw | Sydney Bears | Central Coast Rhinos |
| (Australia) | Alexander Wardlaw | Sydney Bears | Central Coast Rhinos |
| (Australia) | Callum Wardlaw | Sydney Bears | Central Coast Rhinos |
| (Australia) | Connor Wardlaw | Sydney Bears | Central Coast Rhinos |
| (Australia) | Jamie Woodman | CBR Brave | Perth Thunder |

* Mid-season transfer.

==== Retirements ====
| Nat | Player | Team | New role |

==== New signings ====
| Nat | Player | Previous team | New team |
|---|---|---|---|
| (Canada) | Josh Adkins | Bisons de Neuilly-sur-Marne | Newcastle Northstars |
| (United States) | Austin Albrecht | Maine Mariners | CBR Brave |
| (Australia) | Harley Anderson | Brisbane Rampage | Brisbane Lightning |
| (New Zealand) | Bradley Apps | Canterbury Red Devils | Melbourne Mustangs |
| (Australia) | Anthony Barnes | Brisbane Rampage | Brisbane Lightning |
| (United States) | Andrew Bellant | Indy Fuel | Perth Thunder |
| (Australia) | Steve Best | Adelaide Avalanche | Adelaide Adrenaline |
| (Australia) | Mackenzie Bolger | The Coast | Sydney Ice Dogs |
| (Canada) | Josh Bortignon | Adelaide Avalanche | Adelaide Adrenaline |
| (Australia) | Jamie Bourke | Melbourne Ducks | Melbourne Ice |
| (Australia) | Tyler Boyle | Adelaide Tigers | Adelaide Adrenaline |
| (Australia) | Declan Bronte | Salem State Vikings | Melbourne Ice |
| (Canada) | Dane Brumm | No team | Sydney Bears |
| (Canada) | Tanner Butler | Evansville Thunderbolts | Newcastle Northstars |
| (Australia) | Jamie Campbell | West Coast Flyers | Perth Thunder |
| (Australia) | Liam Campbell | Blackhawks IHC | Perth Thunder |
| (Australia) | Jack Carpenter | Melbourne Ducks | Melbourne Ice |
| (Australia) | Aiden Catakovic | Brisbane Blitz | Brisbane Lightning |
| (Australia) | Daniel Chen | Adelaide Avalanche | Adelaide Adrenaline |
| (Australia) | Darren Corstens | Adelaide Avalanche | Adelaide Adrenaline |
| (Australia) | Braden Costa | The Coast | Sydney Ice Dogs |
| (Australia) | Kale Costa | HC Slovan Ústečtí Lvi | CBR Brave |
| (Canada) | Tristan Côté-Cazenave | Rivière-du-Loup 3L | Perth Thunder |
| (United States) | Ace Cowans | EV Lindau Islanders | Sydney Bears |
| (Australia) | Tom Cross | The Coast | Central Coast Rhinos |
| (Australia) | Todd Cutter | Melbourne Ducks | Melbourne Mustangs |
| (Australia) | Hayden Dawes | Melbourne Ducks | Sydney Bears |
| (Australia) | Dillon Dewar | Northern Chiefs | Perth Thunder |
| (Australia) | Justin Dixon | Melbourne Ducks | Melbourne Ice |
| (Australia) | James Douchkov | Sydney Bombers | Sydney Ice Dogs |
| (Australia) | Ivan Doukhovnikov | No team | Central Coast Rhinos |
| (Australia) | James Downie | Manchester Storm | Sydney Bears |
| (Australia) | Luke Doyle | Adelaide Generals | Perth Thunder |
| (Canada) | Brandon Egli | Courchevel-Méribel-Pralognan | Sydney Ice Dogs |
| (Canada) | Sean Ellison | No team | Sydney Ice Dogs |
| (Sweden) | Joakim Erdugan | No team | Central Coast Rhinos |
| (Australia) | Lachlan Fahmy | The Coast | CBR Brave |
| (Australia) | Thomas Flack | Saint Michael's Purple Knights | Melbourne Mustangs |
| (Australia) | Darcy Flanagan | Åseda IF | Melbourne Ice |
| (Australia) | Thomas Forrest | Melbourne Ducks | Melbourne Ice |
| (Canada) | Stefan Fournier | Allen Americans | Sydney Ice Dogs |
| (Australia) | Jordan Freeman | Adelaide Avalanche | Adelaide Adrenaline |
| (Australia) | Jeremy Friederich | Adelaide Avalanche | Adelaide Adrenaline |
| (Australia) | Christian Fuschini | No team | Brisbane Lightning |
| (Canada) | Anthony Gagnon | Rivière-du-Loup 3L | Perth Thunder |
| (Australia) | Logan Gallacher | Melbourne Ducks | Melbourne Ice |
| (Canada) | C.J. Garcia | CSM Corona Brașov | Perth Thunder |
| (Canada) | Alexis Girard | Knoxville Ice Bears | Brisbane Lightning |
| (Australia) | Andrew Glass | No team | CBR Brave |
| (Canada) | Andrew Hamilton | No team | Adelaide Adrenaline |
| (Australia) | Ben Handberg | Adelaide Avalanche | Adelaide Adrenaline |
| (New Zealand) | Matthew Harvey | No team | CBR Brave |
| (Australia) | Jake Hazel | Adelaide Avalanche | Adelaide Adrenaline |
| (Australia) | Joshua Healey | West Coast Flyers | Perth Thunder |
| (United States) | Brady Heppner | Roanoke Rail Yard Dawgs | Sydney Ice Dogs |
| (Australia) | Cameron Hughes | The Coast | Central Coast Rhinos |
| (Canada) | Liam Hughes | Wichita Thunder | Melbourne Mustangs |
| (Canada) | Kyle Hunter | No team | Sydney Ice Dogs |
| (Slovakia) | Samuel Ivanic | Eskilstuna Linden Hockey | Sydney Ice Dogs |
| (United States) | Conner Jean | Evansville Thunderbolts | Perth Thunder |
| (Canada) | Hunter Johnson | Kelowna Chiefs | Central Coast Rhinos |
| (Australia) | Zane Jones | Innisfail Eagles | Newcastle Northstars |
| (Japan) | Yuga Kikuchi | Doshisha University | Melbourne Ice |
| (Australia) | Adam Kimbley | Penrith Raptors | Sydney Bears |
| (Germany) | Artem Klein | HEC Eisbären Heilbronn | Melbourne Ice |
| (Canada) | Dean Klomp | No team | Melbourne Mustangs |
| (Germany) | Patrick Klöpper | Hannover Scorpions | Melbourne Ice |
| (Australia) | Riley Klugerman | Hearst Lumberjacks | Newcastle Northstars |
| (United States) | Roman Kraemer | Robert Morris Colonials | Melbourne Ice |
| (Canada) | Kasey Kulczycki | Huntsville Havoc | Brisbane Lightning |
| (Australia) | Dmitri Kuleshov | Minnesota Loons | Sydney Ice Dogs |
| (Australia) | Ivan Kuleshov | The Coast | Sydney Ice Dogs |
| (Australia) | Nathan Lacasse | No team | Perth Thunder |
| (United States) | Joshua Lammon | Kansas City Mavericks | Sydney Bears |
| (Australia) | Riley Langille | Campbell River Storm | Perth Thunder |
| (Canada) | Chris Lawrence | Fife Flyers | Melbourne Mustangs |
| (Australia) | Tyler Leeming | Adelaide Avalanche | Adelaide Adrenaline |
| (Australia) | Austin Lefkowicz | No team | Melbourne Ice |
| (Australia) | Brody Lindal | Melbourne Ducks | Melbourne Ice |
| (Australia) | Reece Lukowiak | Fort Wayne Spacemen | Perth Thunder |
| (Canada) | David Nelson | West Carleton Rivermen | Brisbane Lightning |
| (Australia) | Nicholas Novysedlak | Brisbane Rampage | Brisbane Lightning |
| (Australia) | Noah Maley | Adelaide Avalanche | Adelaide Adrenaline |
| (Canada) | Cameron Marks | Corsaires de Nantes | CBR Brave |
| (Canada) | Andrew Masters | Français Volants | Central Coast Rhinos |
| (Australia) | Michael McMahon | Melbourne Ducks | Melbourne Mustangs |
| (Canada) | Marc McNulty | Kansas City Mavericks | Sydney Bears |
| (Canada) | Jordan McTaggart | Brisbane Rampage | Brisbane Lightning |
| (Australia) | Ricki Miettinen | Canberra Jokerit | CBR Brave |
| (Australia) | Casey Minson | No team | Melbourne Mustangs |
| (Australia) | Matt Musumeci | Sydney Bombers | Sydney Ice Dogs |
| (Australia) | Daniel O’Handley | Adelaide Generals | Adelaide Adrenaline |
| (United States) | Jake Pappalardo | Birmingham Bulls | Sydney Bears |
| (Australia) | Jaden Pine-Murphy | Brisbane Rampage | Brisbane Lightning |
| (Canada) | Félix Plouffe | Corsaires de Nantes | CBR Brave |
| (Australia) | Jason Polglase | The Coast | Central Coast Rhinos |
| (Hungary) | Patrik Popovics | Brisbane Rampage | Brisbane Lightning |
| (Australia) | Neil Pretorius | Wisconsin Lumberjacks | Brisbane Lightning |
| (Canada) | Coy Prevost | Abu Dhabi Storms | Adelaide Adrenaline |
| (Australia) | Dash Quartarolo | Salem State Vikings | Central Coast Rhinos |
| (Russia) | Vladislav Rachinsky | No team | Melbourne Mustangs |
| (Canada) | Brett Radford | Evansville Thunderbolts | Adelaide Adrenaline |
| (Australia) | Jack Ransome | The Coast | Sydney Ice Dogs |
| (Australia) | Jake Riley | Kurra Hockey Team | Melbourne Ice |
| (Australia) | Mikko Rippon | Brisbane Blitz | Brisbane Lightning |
| (Australia) | Drew Robson | Adelaide Generals | Perth Thunder |
| (Canada) | Shawn Rooke | No team | Sydney Bears |
| (United States) | Maxwell Roth | Worcester State Lancers | Brisbane Lightning |
| (New Zealand) | Ryan Ruddle | Melbourne Ducks | Melbourne Mustangs |
| (Australia) | Anthony Santilli | Brisbane Rampage | Brisbane Lightning |
| (Australia) | Hayden Sayers | The Coast | Central Coast Rhinos |
| (Australia) | Michael Schlamp | No team | Sydney Bears |
| (Australia) | Lachlan Shumak | Reach Rebels | Sydney Ice Dogs |
| (Australia) | Chris Schutz | Hammer Eisbären | Melbourne Ice |
| (Australia) | Jared Siemens | Adelaide Avalanche | Adelaide Adrenaline |
| (Canada) | Andrew Smardon | No team | Newcastle Northstars |
| (Canada) | Kristian Stead | Knoxville Ice Bears | Perth Thunder |
| (Australia) | Zachary Steele | Adelaide Avalanche | Adelaide Adrenaline |
| (Australia) | Thomas Steven | Kungälvs IK | Sydney Bears |
| (Canada) | Christopher Stoikos | No team | CBR Brave |
| (Australia) | Corey Stringer | Melbourne Ducks | Melbourne Ice |
| (Finland) | Ville Tenosalmi | No team | Perth Thunder |
| (Canada) | Brett Thompson | Beaumont Chiefs | Adelaide Adrenaline |
| (Romania) | Zoltán László Tőke | CSM Corona Brașov | Melbourne Ice |
| (Sweden) | Albin Torstensson | Meudon HC | Central Coast Rhinos |
| (Australia) | Matus Trnka | Adelaide Avalanche | Adelaide Adrenaline |
| (Australia) | Byron Tschuma | Melbourne Ducks | Melbourne Ice |
| (Australia) | Mac Tutton | The Coast | Central Coast Rhinos |
| (United States) | Carson Vance | Fayetteville Marksmen | CBR Brave |
| (Canada) | Connor Vermeulen | Toulouse Blagnac HC | Adelaide Adrenaline |
| (France) | Hector Vrielynck | Melbourne Ducks | Melbourne Ice |
| (Canada) | Darcy Walsh | North Dundas Rockets | Adelaide Adrenaline |
| (Australia) | Lliam Webster | Melbourne Ducks | Melbourne Ice |
| (Australia) | Thomas Wedesweiler | Newcastle North Stars (ECSL) | Newcastle Northstars |
| (Australia) | Maliq West | Newcastle North Stars (ECSL) | Newcastle Northstars |
| (Australia) | Nicholas Windle | No team | Perth Thunder |
| (Taiwan) | Kevin Yu | Team Mantis Ice Hockey | Adelaide Adrenaline |

==== Players lost ====
| Nat | Player | Previous team | New team |
|---|---|---|---|
| (Australia) | Samuel Bartlett | Melbourne Ice | Melbourne Glaciers |
| (Australia) | James Barton | Sydney Bears | No team |
| (Australia) | Alan Becken | Sydney Bears | Sydney Bombers |
| (Australia) | Andrew Belic | Melbourne Mustangs | No team |
| (Australia) | Ignacy Benjamin | Sydney Bears | No team |
| (Australia) | Sebastian Bergström | Melbourne Ice | No team |
| (Australia) | Thomas Blackwell | Sydney Ice Dogs | No team |
| (Australia) | Paul Bond | Sydney Bears | No team |
| (Australia) | Michael Breedveld | Melbourne Mustangs | Melbourne Jets |
| (Australia) | Declan Bronte | CBR Brave | Salem State Vikings |
| (Australia) | Riley Bryn | Sydney Bears | No team |
| (Australia) | Joshua Cassar | Sydney Bears | No team |
| (Czech Republic) | Ondrej Cervenka | Sydney Ice Dogs | No team |
| (New Zealand) | Robert Clark | Melbourne Ice | No team |
| (United States) | Garret Cockerill | CBR Brave | Jacksonville Icemen |
| (Australia) | Charlie Davis-Tope | Melbourne Ice | Melbourne Glaciers |
| (Australia) | Kevin Dow | Sydney Ice Dogs | No team |
| (Australia) | James Downie | Newcastle Northstars | Manchester Storm |
| (Australia) | Andrew Erzen | Melbourne Ice | Demons IHC |
| (Australia) | Luke Fiveash | CBR Brave | No team |
| (Australia) | Hussein Ghoniam | Sydney Bears | No team |
| (Poland) | Michal Glowka | Sydney Bears | No team |
| (Australia) | Jacob Haley | Melbourne Mustangs | Braves IHC |
| (Australia) | Wylie Hodder | CBR Brave | No team |
| (Australia) | Jeff Hu | Melbourne Ice | Melbourne Glaciers |
| (Australia) | Bobby Huang | Melbourne Ice | Melbourne Glaciers |
| (Australia) | Liam Jones | Sydney Ice Dogs | Penrith Raptors |
| (Australia) | Eugene Ju | Sydney Ice Dogs | Penrith Raptors |
| (Australia) | Nicholas Kabiotis | Sydney Ice Dogs | Reach Rebels |
| (Australia) | Brian Kim | Sydney Bears | No team |
| (Australia) | Jason Kvisle | Sydney Ice Dogs | Reach Rebels |
| (Australia) | Sai Lake | Melbourne Ice | Demons IHC |
| (Australia) | Chris Leetham | Melbourne Ice | No team |
| (Australia) | Daniel Machin | Melbourne Ice | No team |
| (United States) | Matthew Marasco | CBR Brave | No team |
| (Australia) | Blake Martucci | Melbourne Mustangs | No team |
| (Australia) | Alex May | Melbourne Mustangs | Melbourne Glaciers |
| (Australia) | Jackson McCoy | Melbourne Mustangs | No team |
| (Australia) | Timothy McGrath | Sydney Ice Dogs | Sydney Heat |
| (Australia) | Nathan Moncrieff | Sydney Bears | Penrith Raptors |
| (Australia) | Dylan Morris | Melbourne Mustangs | Saints Monarchs IHC |
| (Australia) | Nicholas Munro | Melbourne Ice | No team |
| (Australia) | Hamish Murray | CBR Brave | No team |
| (Australia) | Spencer Nave | Melbourne Mustangs | Melbourne Glaciers |
| (Australia) | Tim Nikitin | Melbourne Ice | No team |
| (United States) | Ethan Oberman | Sydney Bears | No team |
| (Canada) | Michael Poirier | Sydney Bears | Sorel-Tracy Éperviers |
| (Australia) | Cooper Porter | Melbourne Ice | Melbourne Glaciers |
| (United States) | Dash Quartarolo | Newcastle Northstars | Salem State Vikings |
| (Australia) | Jake Ratcliffe | Sydney Bears | Quad City Storm |
| (Australia) | Brandon Reid | Sydney Ice Dogs | No team |
| (Australia) | Josef Rezek | Melbourne Ice | No team |
| (Australia) | Fredrik Rozenberg | Sydney Ice Dogs | Sydney Sting |
| (Australia) | Marcus Rozenberg | Sydney Ice Dogs | Sydney Sting |
| (Australia) | Connor Sidari-Alley | Melbourne Mustangs | Melbourne Jets |
| (Australia) | Aiden Sillato | Sydney Ice Dogs | No team |
| (Canada) | Paul Smith | Sydney Bears | No team |
| (Australia) | Samuel Sweatman | Melbourne Ice | No team |
| (Australia) | Richard Tesarik | Newcastle Northstars | No team |
| (Australia) | Christian Turner | Sydney Ice Dogs | No team |
| (Canada) | Mario Valery-Trabucco | CBR Brave | No team |
| (Australia) | Joshua Van Douwen | Melbourne Ice | No team |
| (Australia) | Franki Vlasek | Sydney Ice Dogs | No team |

== Regular season ==
=== Fixtures and results ===
The 2023 regular season consists of 130 games that are scheduled to run from 15 April 2023 to 13 August 2023. For the first time since 2012, the AIHL regular season sees teams split into two conferences. Teams will play a total of 26 regular season games, playing each team in their conference four times (two at home and two away) and playing teams outside their conference twice. In May 2023, the game between Brisbane Lightning and Newcastle Northstars, scheduled for Hunter Ice Skating Stadium, had to be postponed due to luggage issues with the airline. In June 2023, the Sydney Bears were found to have accidentally breached the AIHL player cap regulations and penalised three competition points. The postponed Northstars vs Lightning game from May was rescheduled for 30 July 2023.

==== April ====
April
| Game # | Date | Time | Away | Score | Home | Location | Recap |
|---|---|---|---|---|---|---|---|
| 1 | 15 Apr 2023 | 15:30 | Brisbane Lightning | 17–0 | Central Coast Rhinos | Erina Ice Arena |
| 2 | 15 Apr 2023 | 16:30 | Adelaide Adrenaline | 2–6 | Perth Thunder | Perth Ice Arena |
| 3 | 15 Apr 2023 | 17:00 | Newcastle Northstars | 0–11 | Melbourne Mustangs | O’Brien Icehouse |
| 4 | 15 Apr 2023 | 17:00 | Sydney Bears | 6–3 | Sydney Ice Dogs | Macquarie Ice Rink |
| 5 | 16 Apr 2023 | 14:00 | Newcastle Northstars | 4–8 | Melbourne Ice | O’Brien Icehouse |
| 6 | 16 Apr 2023 | 15:30 | CBR Brave | 5–3 | Central Coast Rhinos | Erina Ice Arena |
| 7 | 16 Apr 2023 | 17:00 | Brisbane Lightning | 5–8 | Sydney Ice Dogs | Macquarie Ice Rink |
| 8 | 22 Apr 2023 | 16:30 | Central Coast Rhinos | 0–15 | Brisbane Lightning | Iceworld Boondall |
| 9 | 22 Apr 2023 | 16:30 | Sydney Bears | 6–3 | Adelaide Adrenaline | IceArenA |
| 10 | 22 Apr 2023 | 17:00 | Perth Thunder | 4–2 | Melbourne Ice | O’Brien Icehouse |
| 11 | 22 Apr 2023 | 17:30 | Sydney Ice Dogs | 2–3 (OT) | CBR Brave | Phillip Ice Skating Centre |
| 12 | 23 Apr 2023 | 14:00 | Perth Thunder | 4–5 | Melbourne Mustangs | O’Brien Icehouse |
| 13 | 23 Apr 2023 | 16:30 | Central Coast Rhinos | 0–6 | Brisbane Lightning | Iceworld Boondall |
| 14 | 23 Apr 2023 | 17:00 | CBR Brave | 2–8 | Sydney Bears | Macquarie Ice Rink |
| 15 | 28 Apr 2023 | 19:30 | Melbourne Ice | 1–7 | Melbourne Mustangs | O’Brien Icehouse |
| 16 | 29 Apr 2023 | 15:30 | Adelaide Adrenaline | 9–3 | Central Coast Rhinos | Erina Ice Arena |
| 17 | 29 Apr 2023 | 16:30 | Brisbane Lightning | 2–5 | Perth Thunder | Perth Ice Arena |
| 18 | 29 Apr 2023 | 17:00 | Newcastle Northstars | 3–2 | Sydney Bears | Macquarie Ice Rink |
| 19 | 29 Apr 2023 | 17:00 | CBR Brave | 7–1 | Melbourne Ice | O’Brien Icehouse |
| 20 | 30 Apr 2023 | 14:00 | CBR Brave | 2–3 (SO) | Melbourne Mustangs | O’Brien Icehouse |
| 21 | 30 Apr 2023 | 15:30 | Adelaide Adrenaline | 7–2 | Central Coast Rhinos | Erina Ice Arena |

==== May ====
May
| Game # | Date | Time | Away | Score | Home | Location | Recap |
|---|---|---|---|---|---|---|---|
| 22 | 5 May 2023 | 19:30 | Sydney Ice Dogs | 2–6 | Sydney Bears | Macquarie Ice Rink |
| 23 | 6 May 2023 | 16:30 | Melbourne Mustangs | 2–1 | Perth Thunder | Perth Ice Arena |
| 24 | 6 May 2023 | 16:30 | Adelaide Adrenaline | 3–8 | Brisbane Lightning | Iceworld Boondall |
| 25 | 6 May 2023 | 17:00 | Melbourne Ice | 4–7 | Sydney Bears | Macquarie Ice Rink |
| 26 | 6 May 2023 | 17:30 | Newcastle Northstars | 3–4 | CBR Brave | Phillip Ice Skating Centre |
| 27 | 7 May 2023 | 16:00 | Central Coast Rhinos | 3–13 | Newcastle Northstars | Hunter Ice Skating Stadium |
| 28 | 7 May 2023 | 16:30 | Melbourne Mustangs | 4–5 | Perth Thunder | Perth Ice Arena |
| 29 | 7 May 2023 | 16:30 | Adelaide Adrenaline | 2–5 | Brisbane Lightning | Iceworld Boondall |
| 30 | 7 May 2023 | 17:00 | Melbourne Ice | 5–3 | Sydney Ice Dogs | Macquarie Ice Rink |
| 31 | 13 May 2023 | 15:30 | CBR Brave | 9–1 | Central Coast Rhinos | Erina Ice Arena |
| 32 | 13 May 2023 | 16:30 | Newcastle Northstars | 4–2 | Perth Thunder | Perth Ice Arena |
| 33 | 13 May 2023 | 16:30 | Sydney Ice Dogs | 5–4 | Adelaide Adrenaline | IceArenA |
| 34 | 13 May 2023 | 17:00 | Brisbane Lightning | 3–8 | Melbourne Mustangs | O’Brien Icehouse |
| 35 | 14 May 2023 | 14:00 | Brisbane Lightning | 6–2 | Melbourne Ice | O’Brien Icehouse |
| 36 | 14 May 2023 | 17:00 | Central Coast Rhinos | 2–5 | Sydney Bears | Macquarie Ice Rink |
| 37 | 20 May 2023 | 16:30 | Perth Thunder | 6–7 (SO) | Brisbane Lightning | Iceworld Boondall |
| 38 | 20 May 2023 | 17:00 | Sydney Bears | 7–3 | Melbourne Ice | O’Brien Icehouse |
| 39 | 20 May 2023 | 17:00 | CBR Brave | 4–1 | Sydney Ice Dogs | Macquarie Ice Rink |
| 40 | 20 May 2023 | 17:00 | Central Coast Rhinos | 4–8 | Newcastle Northstars | Hunter Ice Skating Stadium |
| 41 | 21 May 2023 | 14:00 | Sydney Bears | 3–1 | Melbourne Mustangs | O’Brien Icehouse |
| 42 | 26 May 2023 | 19:30 | Melbourne Mustangs | 9–2 | Melbourne Ice | O’Brien Icehouse |
| 43 | 27 May 2023 | 16:30 | Melbourne Ice | 11–3 | Adelaide Adrenaline | IceArenA |
| 44 | 27 May 2023 | 17:00 | Perth Thunder | 4–9 | Melbourne Mustangs | O’Brien Icehouse |
| 45 | 27 May 2023 | 17:00 | Central Coast Rhinos | 4–6 | Sydney Ice Dogs | Macquarie Ice Rink |
| – | 27 May 2023 | 17:00 | Brisbane Lightning | Postponed | Newcastle Northstars | Hunter Ice Skating Stadium |
| 47 | 27 May 2023 | 17:30 | Sydney Bears | 3–2 | CBR Brave | Phillip Ice Skating Centre |
| 48 | 28 May 2023 | 14:00 | Perth Thunder | 6–2 | Melbourne Ice | O’Brien Icehouse |
| 49 | 28 May 2023 | 15:00 | Brisbane Lightning | 5–8 | Newcastle Northstars | Hunter Ice Skating Stadium |

==== June ====
June
| Game # | Date | Time | Away | Score | Home | Location | Recap |
|---|---|---|---|---|---|---|---|
| 50 | 3 Jun 2023 | 16:30 | Central Coast Rhinos | 2–7 | Perth Thunder | Perth Ice Arena |
| 51 | 3 Jun 2023 | 17:00 | Sydney ice Dogs | 5–9 | Melbourne Ice | O’Brien Icehouse |
| 52 | 3 Jun 2023 | 17:00 | Adelaide Adrenaline | 2–6 | Sydney Bears | Macquarie Ice Rink |
| 53 | 3 Jun 2023 | 17:30 | Brisbane Lightning | 5–9 | CBR Brave | Phillip Ice Skating Centre |
| 54 | 4 Jun 2023 | 14:00 | Sydney Ice Dogs | 8–9 (OT) | Melbourne Mustangs | O’Brien Icehouse |
| 55 | 4 Jun 2023 | 15:00 | Adelaide Adrenaline | 5–6 | Newcastle Northstars | Hunter Ice Skating Stadium |
| 56 | 4 Jun 2023 | 16:00 | Brisbane Lightning | 2–7 | CBR Brave | Phillip Ice Skating Centre |
| 57 | 10 Jun 2023 | 16:30 | Melbourne Ice | 11–9 | Brisbane Lightning | Iceworld Boondall |
| 58 | 10 Jun 2023 | 16:30 | Central Coast Rhinos | 6–3 | Adelaide Adrenaline | IceArenA |
| 59 | 10 Jun 2023 | 17:00 | Perth Thunder | 3–1 | Sydney Bears | Macquarie Ice Rink |
| 60 | 10 Jun 2023 | 17:00 | Melbourne Mustangs | 2–5 | Newcastle Northstars | Hunter Ice Skating Stadium |
| 61 | 11 Jun 2023 | 12:30 | Central Coast Rhinos | 6–5 (OT) | Adelaide Adrenaline | IceArenA |
| 62 | 11 Jun 2023 | 15:00 | Perth Thunder | 5–6 | Newcastle Northstars | Hunter Ice Skating Stadium |
| 63 | 11 Jun 2023 | 16:00 | Melbourne Mustangs | 2–8 | CBR Brave | Phillip Ice Skating Centre |
| 64 | 11 Jun 2023 | 17:00 | Melbourne Ice | 4–8 | Sydney Ice Dogs | Macquarie Ice Rink |
| 65 | 17 Jun 2023 | 15:30 | Melbourne Ice | 14–8 | Central Coast Rhinos | Erina Ice Arena |
| 66 | 17 Jun 2023 | 16:30 | Brisbane Lightning | 0–4 | Adelaide Adrenaline | IceArenA |
| 67 | 17 Jun 2023 | 17:00 | Perth Thunder | 6–1 | Sydney Ice Dogs | Macquarie Ice Rink |
| 68 | 17 Jun 2023 | 17:30 | Newcastle Northstars | 4–5 | CBR Brave | Phillip Ice Skating Centre |
| 69 | 18 Jun 2023 | 12:30 | Brisbane Lightning | 7–4 | Adelaide Adrenaline | IceArenA |
| 70 | 18 Jun 2023 | 15:30 | Newcastle Northstars | 6–2 | Central Coast Rhinos | Erina Ice Arena |
| 71 | 18 Jun 2023 | 16:00 | Melbourne Ice | 7–9 | CBR Brave | Phillip Ice Skating Centre |
| 72 | 18 Jun 2023 | 17:00 | Perth Thunder | 6–5 | Sydney Bears | Macquarie Ice Rink |
| 73 | 23 Jun 2023 | 19:30 | Melbourne Ice | 3–6 | Melbourne Mustangs | O’Brien Icehouse |
| 74 | 24 Jun 2023 | 16:30 | CBR Brave | 7–4 | Perth Thunder | Perth Ice Arena |
| 75 | 24 Jun 2023 | 16:30 | Sydney Bears | 4–2 | Brisbane Lightning | Iceworld Boondall |
| 76 | 24 Jun 2023 | 17:00 | Central Coast Rhinos | 4–11 | Melbourne Ice | O’Brien Icehouse |
| 77 | 24 Jun 2023 | 17:00 | Adelaide Adrenaline | 2–5 | Sydney Ice Dogs | Macquarie Ice Rink |
| 78 | 25 Jun 2023 | 14:00 | Central Coast Rhinos | 3–4 | Melbourne Mustangs | O’Brien Icehouse |
| 79 | 25 Jun 2023 | 15:00 | Adelaide Adrenaline | 2–11 | Newcastle Northstars | Hunter Ice Skating Stadium |

==== July ====
July
| Game # | Date | Time | Away | Score | Home | Location | Recap |
|---|---|---|---|---|---|---|---|
| 80 | 1 Jul 2023 | 15:30 | Melbourne Mustangs | 9–7 | Central Coast Rhinos | Erina Ice Arena |
| 81 | 1 Jul 2023 | 16:30 | CBR Brave | 7–3 | Brisbane Lightning | Iceworld Boondall |
| 82 | 1 Jul 2023 | 16:30 | Perth Thunder | 6–2 | Adelaide Adrenaline | IceArenA |
| 83 | 1 Jul 2023 | 17:00 | Melbourne Ice | 2–6 | Sydney Bears | Macquarie Ice Rink |
| 84 | 1 Jul 2023 | 17:00 | Sydney Ice Dogs | 2–8 | Newcastle Northstars | Hunter Ice Skating Stadium |
| 85 | 2 Jul 2023 | 15:00 | Melbourne Ice | 3–4 | Newcastle Northstars | Hunter Ice Skating Stadium |
| 86 | 2 Jul 2023 | 15:30 | Sydney Ice Dogs | 9–5 | Central Coast Rhinos | Erina Ice Arena |
| 87 | 2 Jul 2023 | 16:30 | CBR Brave | 9–2 | Brisbane Lightning | Iceworld Boondall |
| 88 | 2 Jul 2023 | 17:00 | Melbourne Mustangs | 3–8 | Sydney Bears | Macquarie Ice Rink |
| 89 | 8 Jul 2023 | 16:30 | Melbourne Ice | 4–5 | Perth Thunder | Perth Ice Arena |
| 90 | 8 Jul 2023 | 16:30 | Melbourne Mustangs | 6–1 | Brisbane Lightning | Iceworld Boondall |
| 91 | 8 Jul 2023 | 17:00 | Newcastle Northstars | 5–1 | Sydney Ice Dogs | Macquarie Ice Rink |
| 92 | 8 Jul 2023 | 17:30 | Adelaide Adrenaline | 3–8 | CBR Brave | Phillip Ice Skating Centre |
| 93 | 9 Jul 2023 | 16:00 | Adelaide Adrenaline | 1–8 | CBR Brave | Phillip Ice Skating Centre |
| 94 | 9 Jul 2023 | 16:30 | Melbourne Ice | 7–5 | Perth Thunder | Perth Ice Arena |
| 95 | 9 Jul 2023 | 17:00 | Melbourne Mustangs | 9–2 | Sydney Ice Dogs | Macquarie Ice Rink |
| 96 | 14 Jul 2023 | 19:30 | Sydney Bears | 7–1 | Sydney Ice Dogs | Macquarie Ice Rink |
| 97 | 15 Jul 2023 | 16:30 | Newcastle Northstars | 9–5 | Adelaide Adrenaline | IceArenA |
| 98 | 15 Jul 2023 | 17:00 | Melbourne Mustangs | 6–4 | Sydney Bears | Macquarie Ice Rink |
| 99 | 15 Jul 2023 | 17:30 | Perth Thunder | 4–3 | CBR Brave | Phillip Ice Skating Centre |
| 100 | 16 Jul 2023 | 12:30 | Newcastle Northstars | 5–2 | Adelaide Adrenaline | IceArenA |
| 101 | 16 Jul 2023 | 17:00 | Melbourne Mustangs | 5–2 | Sydney Ice Dogs | Macquarie Ice Rink |
| 102 | 21 Jul 2023 | 19:30 | Melbourne Mustangs | 11–4 | Melbourne Ice | O’Brien Icehouse |
| 103 | 22 Jul 2023 | 16:30 | Sydney Ice Dogs | 2–11 | Perth Thunder | Perth Ice Arena |
| 104 | 22 Jul 2023 | 16:30 | Newcastle Northstars | 5–8 | Brisbane Lightning | Iceworld Boondall |
| 105 | 22 Jul 2023 | 17:00 | Sydney Bears | 4–2 | Melbourne Mustangs | O’Brien Icehouse |
| 106 | 23 Jul 2023 | 14:00 | Sydney Bears | 9–7 | Melbourne Ice | O’Brien Icehouse |
| 107 | 23 Jul 2023 | 16:00 | Central Coast Rhinos | 0–10 | CBR Brave | Phillip Ice Skating Centre |
| 108 | 23 Jul 2023 | 16:30 | Sydney Ice Dogs | 2–7 | Perth Thunder | Perth Ice Arena |
| 109 | 23 Jul 2023 | 16:30 | Newcastle Northstars | 6–5 (SO) | Brisbane Lightning | Iceworld Boondall |
| 110 | 29 Jul 2023 | 15:30 | Perth Thunder | 13–1 | Central Coast Rhinos | Erina Ice Arena |
| 111 | 29 Jul 2023 | 17:00 | Adelaide Adrenaline | 2–5 | Melbourne Mustangs | O’Brien Icehouse |
| 112 | 29 Jul 2023 | 17:00 | Sydney Ice Dogs | 3–5 | Sydney Bears | Macquarie Ice Rink |
| 113 | 29 Jul 2023 | 17:00 | CBR Brave | 6–2 | Newcastle Northstars | Hunter Ice Skating Stadium |
| 114 | 30 Jul 2023 | 14:00 | Adelaide Adrenaline | 5–7 | Melbourne Ice | O’Brien Icehouse |
| 46 | 30 Jul 2023 | 15:00 | Brisbane Lightning | 4–7 | Newcastle Northstars | Hunter Ice Skating Stadium |
| 115 | 30 Jul 2023 | 15:30 | Sydney Bears | 4–2 | Central Coast Rhinos | Erina Ice Arena |
| 116 | 30 Jul 2023 | 17:00 | Perth Thunder | 8–4 | Sydney Ice Dogs | Macquarie Ice Rink |

==== August ====
August
| Game # | Date | Time | Away | Score | Home | Location | Recap |
|---|---|---|---|---|---|---|---|
| 117 | 5 Aug 2023 | 15:30 | Brisbane Lightning | 20–1 | Central Coast Rhinos | Erina Ice Arena |
| 118 | 5 Aug 2023 | 16:30 | CBR Brave | 13–3 | Adelaide Adrenaline | IceArenA |
| 119 | 5 Aug 2023 | 17:00 | Sydney Ice Dogs | 8–10 | Melbourne Ice | O’Brien Icehouse |
| 120 | 5 Aug 2023 | 17:00 | Sydney Bears | 6–5 | Newcastle Northstars | Hunter Ice Skating Stadium |
| 121 | 6 Aug 2023 | 12:30 | CBR Brave | 6–2 | Adelaide Adrenaline | IceArenA |
| 122 | 6 Aug 2023 | 14:00 | Sydney Ice Dogs | 3–7 | Melbourne Mustangs | O’Brien Icehouse |
| 123 | 6 Aug 2023 | 15:30 | Newcastle Northstars | 18–5 | Central Coast Rhinos | Erina Ice Arena |
| 124 | 6 Aug 2023 | 17:00 | Brisbane Lightning | 4–6 | Sydney Bears | Macquarie Ice Rink |
| 125 | 12 Aug 2023 | 16:30 | Sydney Bears | 3–2 | Perth Thunder | Perth Ice Arena |
| 126 | 12 Aug 2023 | 16:30 | Sydney Ice Dogs | 8–5 | Brisbane Lightning | Iceworld Boondall |
| 127 | 12 Aug 2023 | 16:30 | Melbourne Mustangs | 2–5 | Adelaide Adrenaline | IceArenA |
| 128 | 12 Aug 2023 | 17:30 | Central Coast Rhinos | 1–12 | CBR Brave | Phillip Ice Skating Centre |
| 129 | 13 Aug 2023 | 16:00 | CBR Brave | 5–7 | Newcastle Northstars | Hunter Ice Skating Stadium |
| 130 | 13 Aug 2023 | 16:30 | Sydney Bears | 1–6 | Perth Thunder | Perth Ice Arena |

Key:

Winner

=== Standings ===
==== Overall ====
| Pos | Team | Pld | W | OTW | OTL | L | GF | GA | GD | Pts | Qualification or relegation |
|---|---|---|---|---|---|---|---|---|---|---|---|
| 1 | CBR Brave (P) | 26 | 20 | 1 | 1 | 4 | 170 | 77 | +93 | 63 | 2023 Goodall Cup Finals |
| 2 | Sydney Bears | 26 | 21 | 0 | 0 | 5 | 132 | 81 | +51 | 60 | 2023 Goodall Cup Finals |
| 3 | Newcastle Northstars | 26 | 18 | 1 | 0 | 7 | 162 | 112 | +50 | 56 | 2023 Goodall Cup Finals |
| 4 | Melbourne Mustangs | 26 | 17 | 2 | 0 | 7 | 147 | 94 | +53 | 55 | 2023 Goodall Cup Finals |
| 5 | Perth Thunder | 26 | 17 | 0 | 1 | 8 | 141 | 90 | +51 | 52 | 2023 Goodall Cup Finals |
| 6 | Melbourne Ice | 26 | 10 | 0 | 0 | 16 | 144 | 165 | −21 | 30 | |
| 7 | Brisbane Lightning | 26 | 9 | 1 | 1 | 15 | 156 | 136 | +20 | 30 | 2023 Goodall Cup Finals |
| 8 | Sydney Ice Dogs | 26 | 7 | 0 | 2 | 17 | 104 | 159 | −55 | 23 | |
| 9 | Adelaide Adrenaline | 26 | 4 | 0 | 1 | 21 | 90 | 162 | −72 | 13 | |
| 10 | Central Coast Rhinos | 26 | 1 | 1 | 0 | 24 | 75 | 245 | −170 | 5 | |

Source: AIHL Elite Prospects
Rules for classification:
Tie-break: 1) points; 2) points percentage; 3) head to head; 4) goal difference; 5) goals scored; 6) coin toss
Points: 3 points for regulation win; 2 points for OT or SO win; 1 point for OT or SO loss; 0 points for regulation loss
Note: Sydney Bears deducted 3 points by the league for accidentally breaching player cap regulations in June 2023.
(P) Premiers

==== Hellyer Conference ====
| Pos | Team | Pld | W | OTW | OTL | L | GF | GA | GD | Pts | Qualification or relegation |
|---|---|---|---|---|---|---|---|---|---|---|---|
| 1 | Sydney Bears | 26 | 21 | 0 | 0 | 5 | 132 | 81 | +51 | 60 | 2023 Goodall Cup Finals |
| 2 | Melbourne Mustangs | 26 | 17 | 2 | 0 | 7 | 147 | 94 | +53 | 55 | 2023 Goodall Cup Finals |
| 3 | Perth Thunder | 26 | 17 | 0 | 1 | 8 | 141 | 90 | +51 | 52 | 2023 Goodall Cup Finals |
| 4 | Melbourne Ice | 26 | 10 | 0 | 0 | 16 | 144 | 165 | −21 | 30 | |
| 5 | Sydney Ice Dogs | 26 | 7 | 0 | 2 | 17 | 104 | 159 | −55 | 23 | |

Updated to match(es) played on 6 August 2023. Source: AIHL Elite Prospects
Rules for classification:
Tie-break: 1) points; 2) points percentage; 3) head to head; 4) goal difference; 5) goals scored; 6) coin toss
Points: 3 points for regulation win; 2 points for OT or SO win; 1 point for OT or SO loss; 0 points for regulation loss
Note: Sydney Bears deducted 3 points by the league for accidentally breaching player cap regulations in June 2023.

==== Rurak Conference ====
| Pos | Team | Pld | W | OTW | OTL | L | GF | GA | GD | Pts | Qualification or relegation |
|---|---|---|---|---|---|---|---|---|---|---|---|
| 1 | CBR Brave | 26 | 20 | 1 | 1 | 4 | 170 | 77 | +93 | 63 | 2023 Goodall Cup Finals |
| 2 | Newcastle Northstars | 26 | 18 | 1 | 0 | 7 | 162 | 112 | +50 | 56 | 2023 Goodall Cup Finals |
| 3 | Brisbane Lightning | 26 | 9 | 1 | 1 | 15 | 156 | 136 | +20 | 30 | 2023 Goodall Cup Finals |
| 4 | Adelaide Adrenaline | 26 | 4 | 0 | 1 | 21 | 90 | 162 | −72 | 13 | |
| 5 | Central Coast Rhinos | 26 | 1 | 1 | 0 | 24 | 75 | 245 | −170 | 5 | |

Updated to match(es) played on 6 August 2023. Source: AIHL Elite Prospects
Rules for classification:
Tie-break: 1) points; 2) points percentage; 3) head to head; 4) goal difference; 5) goals scored; 6) coin toss
Points: 3 points for regulation win; 2 points for OT or SO win; 1 point for OT or SO loss; 0 points for regulation loss

=== Statistics ===
==== Skater statistics ====
2023 AIHL season top-ten skater statistics for points, goals, assists and penalty minutes.

Points
| # | Name | Team | Pos | Pts |
|---|---|---|---|---|
| 1 | (Canada) Scott Timmins | MM | F | 82 |
| 2 | (United States) Austin Albrecht | CB | F | 76 |
| 3 | (Canada) Felix Plouffe | CB | F | 64 |
| 4 | (Canada) Ty Wishart | MM | D | 60 |
| 5 | (Canada) Daniel Berno | NN | F | 58 |
| 6 | (Australia) Casey Kubara | CB | F | 57 |
| 7 | (Australia) Chris Schutz | MI | F | 53 |
| 8 | (Canada) Francis Drolet | NN | F | 53 |
| 9 | (Sweden) Joakim Erdugan | CR | F | 49 |
| 10 | (Canada) Chris Lawrence | MM | F | 49 |

Goals
| # | Name | Team | Pos | G |
|---|---|---|---|---|
| 1 | (United States) Austin Albrecht | CB | F | 39 |
| 2 | (Canada) Scott Timmins | MM | F | 33 |
| 3 | (Australia) Chris Schutz | MI | F | 28 |
| 4 | (Australia) Tomas Landa | SB | F | 26 |
| 5 | (Canada) Daniel Berno | NN | F | 25 |
| 6 | (Australia) Zane Jones | NN | F | 25 |
| 7 | (Sweden) Joakim Erdugan | CR | F | 24 |
| 8 | (Australia) Riley Klugerman | NN | F | 22 |
| 9 | (Australia) Julian Fodor | BL | F | 22 |
| 10 | (Australia) Tommy Steven | SB | F | 22 |

Assists
| # | Name | Team | Pos | A |
|---|---|---|---|---|
| 1 | (Canada) Scott Timmins | MM | F | 49 |
| 2 | (Canada) Felix Plouffe | CB | F | 44 |
| 3 | (Canada) Ty Wishart | MM | D | 44 |
| 4 | (Australia) Casey Kubara | CB | F | 41 |
| 5 | (United States) Austin Albrecht | CB | F | 37 |
| 6 | (Canada) Josh Adkins | NN | F | 37 |
| 7 | (Canada) Grant Toulmin | SD | F | 34 |
| 8 | (Canada) Daniel Berno | NN | F | 33 |
| 9 | (Canada) Francis Drolet | NN | F | 33 |
| 10 | (United States) Carson Vance | CB | D | 33 |

Penalty minutes
| # | Name | Team | Pos | PIM |
|---|---|---|---|---|
| 1 | (Australia) Hamish Powell | NN | F | 131 |
| 2 | (Australia) Darcy Flanagan | MI | D | 102 |
| 3 | (Canada) Kasey Kulczycki | BL | F | 86 |
| 4 | (Australia) Jamie Bourke | MI | F | 83 |
| 5 | (Australia) Sacha Rapchuk | BL | F | 79 |
| 6 | (Australia) Alec Stephenson | SD | F | 74 |
| 7 | (Sweden) Joakim Erdugan | CR | F | 71 |
| 8 | (Australia) Daniel O'Handley | AA | F | 71 |
| 9 | (Australia) Nicholas Doornbos | SD | D | 66 |
| 10 | (Australia) Patrick Nadin | NN | F | 59 |

==== Goaltender statistics ====
2023 AIHL season top-ten^{1} goaltender statistics for goals against average and save percentage.

^{1} only goaltenders who have played 10 or more games qualify for these lists

Goals against average
| # | Name | Team | Pos | GAA |
|---|---|---|---|---|
| 1 | (Australia) Anthony Kimlin | SB | G | 2.60 |
| 2 | (Canada) Kristian Stead | PT | G | 2.77 |
| 3 | (Canada) Liam Hughes | MM | G | 2.86 |
| 4 | (Australia) Aleksi Toivonen | CB | G | 2.86 |
| 5 | (Australia) Alex Tetreault | CB | G | 3.00 |
| 6 | (Australia) Charles Smart | NN | G | 3.61 |
| 7 | (Australia) Nicholas Novysedlak | BL | G | 4.61 |
| 8 | (Australia) Matus Trnka | AA | G | 5.19 |
| 9 | (Australia) Steve Harris | BL | G | 5.42 |
| 10 | (Australia) Michael James | MI | G | 5.45 |

Save percentage
| # | Name | Team | Pos | SV% |
|---|---|---|---|---|
| 1 | (Australia) Anthony Kimlin | SB | G | .921 |
| 2 | (Canada) Liam Hughes | MM | G | .916 |
| 3 | (Canada) Kristian Stead | PT | G | .908 |
| 4 | (Australia) Alex Tetreault | CB | G | .894 |
| 5 | (Australia) Aleksi Toivonen | CB | G | .892 |
| 6 | (Australia) Charles Smart | NN | G | .889 |
| 7 | (Australia) Jakob Doornbos | SD | G | .870 |
| 8 | (Australia) Nicholas Novysedlak | BL | G | .867 |
| 9 | (Canada) Andrew Masters | CR | G | .866 |
| 10 | (Australia) Michael James | MI | G | .857 |

=== Awards ===
==== Skaters Network player of the week ====
Each week the AIHL, through sponsorship, names a player of the week.
The award is based on the following criteria:

- individual performance, including significant game statistics;
- contribution to the team's success through individual leadership abilities; and
- performance off the ice, including community engagement.

| Round | Awarded to | Pos | Ref |
|---|---|---|---|
| 1 | (Canada) Jordan McTaggart | F | Ref |
| 2 | (Australia) Michael Schlamp | F | Ref |
| 3 | (Australia) Charlie Smart | G | Ref |
| 4 | (Australia) Alexandre Tetreault | G | Ref |
| 5 | (Australia) Strat Allen | F | Ref |
| 6 | (Australia) Thomas Steven | F | Ref |
| 7 | (Australia) Vadim Virjassov | F | Ref |
| 8 | (Australia) Casey Kubara | F | Ref |
| 9 | (Australia) Robert Malloy | D | Ref |
| 10 | (Australia) Chris Schutz | F | Ref |
| 11 | (Australia) Sebastian Woodlands | G | Ref |
| 12 | (Australia) Wehebe Darge | F | Ref |
| 13 | (Australia) Thomas Flack | F | Ref |
| 14 | (Australia) Riley Klugerman | F | Ref |
| 15 | (Australia) Jordan Kyros | F | Ref |
| 16 | (Australia) Benjamin Breault | F | Ref |

==== Season awards ====
Below lists the 2023 AIHL regular season award winners. With no official local player award for 2023, AIHL Fans conducted a community poll on Facebook and awarded Perth Thunder's Jordan Kyros AIHL Fans Local Player of the Year award for 2023. Kyros claimed 15% of all votes after a breakout season where he scored 36 points in 26 games.

| Award | Name | Team |
|---|---|---|
| MVP | (Canada) Scott Timmins | Melbourne Mustangs |
| Goaltender | (Canada) Andrew Masters | Central Coast Rhinos |
| Defenceman | (Canada) Ty Wishart | Melbourne Mustangs |
| Local | Not awarded |
| Rookie | (Australia) Riley Klugerman | Newcastle Northstars |
| Coach | (Australia) Benjamin Breault | Perth Thunder |

== Goodall Cup playoffs ==
For season 2023, the AIHL adopted a new two weekend Finals format. The new format involved two play-in finals games during the first weekend and then two semi-finals and grand final in the second weekend. The new format involved single elimination games, with the losing team eliminated and winning team advancing to the next round. Participating teams in the AIHL Finals increased from four to six for the first time in league history. Qualification for Finals involved the highest three ranking teams from each AIHL regular season conference (Hellyer and Rurak). The top ranked teams from each conference would automatically qualify for the semi-finals, with the second and third ranked teams entering Finals at the play-in stage with a conference cross-over. The winner of Finals would continue to be named AIHL Champions and lift the historic Goodall Cup, just as it has been in previous seasons.

Melbourne's O'Brien Icehouse and Newcastle's Hunter Ice Skating Stadium were selected as host venues for the 2023 AIHL Finals. Newcastle hosting one of the play-in games and Melbourne hosting the other play-in as well as the second weekend. Following the conclusion of the 2023 AIHL regular season, the CBR Brave and Sydney Bears finished top of their respective conferences to directly qualify for the semi-finals in Melbourne in week two. The Melbourne Mustangs, Newcastle Northstars, Perth Thunder and Brisbane Lightning qualified for the play-ins in week one. The Northstars would play the Thunder in Newcastle and the Mustangs would play the Lightning in Melbourne. In week one, the Mustangs and Thunder won their respective play-in finals to advance to the semi-finals in week two. In week two, on Saturday, the Mustangs shutout the Bears in semi-final one to cause an upset, the Brave then eventually defeated the Thunder in semi-final two, after a lengthy player injury delay in the second period. On Sunday, the Brave faced-off with the hometown team the Mustangs in the grand final for the Goodall Cup. In a tightly contested game, the Mustangs prevailed and won 1–0, their second Finals shutout in a row. It was the Mustangs second ever Championship title and their first in nine years, since 2014 when they last won. The Brave missed out on going back-to-back. Following the grand final, Melbourne Mustangs' Canadian gaoltender, Liam Hughes, was named Finals MVP for his heroic two shutouts.

Play-ins
20 August – Melbourne
Melbourne Mustangs | 8
Brisbane Lightning | 3
19 August – Newcastle
Newcastle Northstars | 1
Perth Thunder | 4

Semi-finals
26 August – Melbourne
Sydney Bears | 0
Melbourne Mustangs | 4
26 August – Melbourne
CBR Brave | 4
Perth Thunder | 1

Grand final
27 August – Melbourne
Melbourne Mustangs | 1
CBR Brave | 0

All times are UTC+10:00

=== Play-in finals ===
| 19 August 2023; 17:00 | Newcastle Northstars | 1–4 (0–1, 1–0, 0–3) | Perth Thunder | Hunter Ice Skating Stadium |

Game reference

(Australia) Charles Smart
Goalies
(Canada) Kristian Stead
Referees:
Kent Unwin
Mark Peruzzo
Linesmen:
Hayden Rogers
Luke Power

| | 0 – 1 | Breault (Jean, Langille) |
| (Klugerman, Darge) Adkins | 1 – 1 |
| | 1 – 2 | Kudla (Kyros) |
| | 1 – 3 | Jean (Unassisted) |
| | 1 – 4 | Webster (Unassisted) |

8 min
Penalties
4 min
47
Shots
39

| 20 August 2023; 14:00 | Melbourne Mustangs | 8–3 (3–1, 2–2, 3–0) | Brisbane Lightning | O’Brien Icehouse |

Game reference

(Canada) Liam Hughes
Goalies
(Australia) Steve Harris
Referees:
Rob Love
David Gal
Linesmen:
Russell Dow
David Rehak

| | 0 – 1 | Fodor (McTaggart, Fuschini) |
| (Lawrence) Wishart | 1 – 1 |
| (Cutter) Humphries | 2 – 1 |
| (Humphries, Hughes) Turner | 3 – 1 |
| | 3 – 2 | Anderson (Roth) |
| (Wishart) Virjassov | 4 – 2 |
| | 4 – 3 | Kulczycki (Roth, Harris) |
| (Lawrence) Wishart | 5 – 3 |
| (Virjassov, Wishart) Apps | 6 – 3 |
| (McDowell) Timmins | 7 – 3 |
| (Khroustalev, Jones) Humphries | 8 – 3 |

10 min
Penalties
20 min
33
Shots
27

=== Semi-finals ===
| 26 August 2023; 14:00 | Sydney Bears | 0–4 (0–0, 0–1, 0–3) | Melbourne Mustangs | O’Brien Icehouse |

Game reference

(Australia) Anthony Kimlin
Goalies
(Canada) Liam Hughes
Referees:
David Gal
Kent Unwin
Linesmen:
David Rehak
Luke Power

| 0 – 1 | Timmins (Wishart, McDowell) |
| 0 – 2 | Virjassov (Wishart) |
| 0 – 3 | Virjassov (Unassisted) |
| 0 – 4 | Lawrence (Timmins) |

4 min
Penalties
10 min
41
Shots
39

| 26 August 2023; 18:30 | CBR Brave | 4–1 (2–1, 0–0, 2–0) | Perth Thunder | O’Brien Icehouse |

Game reference

(Australia) Aleksi Toivonen
Goalies
(Canada) Kristian Stead
Referees:
Rob Love
Mark Peruzzo
Linesmen:
Russell Dow
Hayden Rogers

| (Plouffe) Albrecht | 1 – 0 |
| (Camenzind) T Kubara | 2 – 0 |
| | 2 – 1 | Breault (Jean) |
| (Hughes, Harvey) B Kubara | 3 – 1 |
| (Albrecht, Vance) Plouffe | 4 – 1 |

6 min
Penalties
4 min
50
Shots
39

=== Final ===
| 27 August 2023; 14:00 | Melbourne Mustangs | 1–0 (0–0, 1–0, 0–0) | CBR Brave | O’Brien Icehouse |

Game reference
| (Canada) Liam Hughes | Goalies | (Australia) Aleksi Toivonen | Referees: Kent Unwin; David Gal; Linesmen: Russell Dow; Hayden Rogers |
| (Lawrence, Timmins) McDowell / 1 – 0 | | | Referees: Kent Unwin; David Gal; Linesmen: Russell Dow; Hayden Rogers |
| 2 min | Penalties | 2 min | Referees: Kent Unwin; David Gal; Linesmen: Russell Dow; Hayden Rogers |
| 22 | Shots | 33 | Referees: Kent Unwin; David Gal; Linesmen: Russell Dow; Hayden Rogers |
