= Brisbane Lightning =

- City: Brisbane, Queensland
- League: Australian Ice Hockey League
- Founded: 13 February 2022 (4 years ago)
- Operated: 2022–present
- Home arena: Iceworld Boondall
- Colours: Black, grey and white
- Owner: Jemsec Investments
- General manager: (Australia) Ivan Rapchuk
- Head coach: (Canada) Nathan Deyell
- Captain: (United States) Aaron Wanat
- Affiliates: Brisbane Lightning (Women); Brisbane Buccaneers; Southern Stars
- Website: BrisbaneLightning.com.au

Franchise history
- 2022–present: Brisbane Lightning

Championships
- H Newman Reid Trophies: 0
- Goodall Cups: 0

The Brisbane Lightning is a semi-professional ice hockey team based in Brisbane, Queensland. The team is a member of the Australian Ice Hockey League (AIHL). The team was founded in 2022 as an expansion AIHL team and are the first team based in Queensland since the Blue Tongues last competed in 2012. The Lightning's home venue is Iceworld Boondall and the team formally entered the AIHL regular season in 2023.

== History ==
=== Establishment ===
The Brisbane Lightning was founded on 13 February 2022. The Lightning was born out of a joint venture between Ice Hockey Queensland (IHQ) and the Brisbane Buccaneers and Southern Stars, following IHQ pulling support from the Brisbane Rampage. The joint venture's goal was to establish a top-level ice hockey team in Brisbane and obtain an Australian Ice Hockey League (AIHL) licence. On 28 February 2022, the Lightning secured an AIHL licence, and would enter the league in the 2023 season. In 2022, Brisbane would set up the organisation, hire back and front office staff, form a playing roster and play a number of exhibition games against AIHL teams.

After securing their AIHL licence in February 2022, Brisbane announced the appointment of their inaugural head coach on 9 March 2022. Terry Kiliwnik was named along with his assistant coach Ivan Rapchuk. Kiliwnik joined the new team with a wealth of junior coaching experience with Queensland and had most recently been the head coach of the Brisbane Goannas in the Australian Women's Ice Hockey League (AWIHL). Rapchuk also joined with a wealth of Queensland junior hockey coaching experience. The following day the yet unnamed team officially launched their new name, Brisbane Lightning and confirmed exhibition matches would be held in 2022 with AIHL opposition. On 14 March 2022, the team unveiled its logo and colours that had been designed by P27 Motion Design. The logo features the team name Brisbane Lightning and a stylised Story Bridge in front of a background of the Brisbane CBD and a bolt of lightning. The team's colours would be black, grey and white, similar to the Los Angeles Kings. In April 2022, the Lightning announced their maiden playing roster. The roster included two players, Damian Bright and Thomas Kiliwnik, moving from rival AIHL teams, Melbourne Mustangs and Newcastle Northstars respectively. Five players named had already been announced for the Rampage for 2022 and Matthew Johnson was the only selected player to have played for the previous AIHL Queensland team Gold Coast Blue Tongues. On 9 April 2022, the AIHL released its updated season schedule and the Lightning confirmed it would participate in 15 exhibition games in 2022. Beginning late April and running through to late August, Brisbane would face-off home and away against six teams, including: Northstars, Ice Dogs, Bears, Mustangs, Rhinos and Brave.

The Lightning announced its inaugural on-ice leadership team on 23 April 2022. Experienced AIHL defenceman, Damian Bright, was named lightning's first captain with Dylan Kendrick and Eric Speedie serving as alternate captains.

=== Exhibition season (2022) ===
Boondall was the setting for the Lightning's first ever game on 23 April 2022. Brisbane played the visiting Melbourne Mustangs in front of a sell out crowd. The home team controlled the game and led at every interval. In the first period the Lightning finished 3-0 ahead. Eric Speedie scored the first ever Brisbane Lightning goal. In the second period Brisbane added to their tally with another goal to lead 4-0. The third period proved a closer encounter with the Mustangs registering a goal but the Lightning did not let up and posted two goals themselves to win the game 6-1.

On 24 July 2022, the exhibition game between the Brisbane Lightning and Sydney Bears held at Iceworld Boondall in Brisbane was abandoned near the end of the second period following an ugly high sticking incident. Subsequently, the AIHL Player Safety Committee conducted an investigation into the incident. The committee concluded its investigation on 6 August 2022 and announced its ruling. It decided to suspend the Brisbane Lightning player involved for seven AIHL games. It also suspended the player from all Ice Hockey Australia national events until the penalty is served in 2023. Additionally, the Sydney Bears organisation was fined $3,500 for intentionally forfeiting the game.

Brisbane ended up playing 14 exhibition games in total in 2022, one short of the originally planned 15, after the game in late August verse the CBR Brave was cancelled. The Lightning's exhibition record in 2022 saw the Brisbane team win seven games, lose six games and lose a further two games in overtime. Following the conclusion of the exhibition season, the Lightning awarded Eamon McKay with the coaches award and Steve Harris as the players player award.

=== Admission to the AIHL and AWIHL ===
On 9 September 2022, the AIHL announced that the Brisbane Lightning had been successful in obtaining a full AIHL licence and would join the league for season 2023. Following this announcement, the Lightning organisation secured an agreement with the Australian Women's Ice Hockey League (AWIHL) team Brisbane Goannas in early October 2022 to acquire the founding AWIHL team and re-brand them as the Lightning.

At the beginning of 2024, in January, Ice Hockey Queensland announced the sale of the Brisbane Lightning men’s team to Jemsec Investments. Jemsec is headed by Lightning supporters Julie and Michael Sugden. The sale ended IHQ’s direct involvement with the Lightning men’s program, however IHQ would continue to own and run the Lightning women’s program. Following the sale of the team, the general manager’s position changed with Peter Holmes replaced by Ivan Rapchuk. In addition to the general manager’s position, Rapchuk was also appointed governor of the Lightning organisation.

== Season-by-season results ==
Brisbane Lightning all-time record
Season	Regular season											Finals									Top points scorer
Season	P	W	T	L	OW	OL	GF	GA	GD	Pts	Finish	P	W	L	GF	GA	Result	Preliminary Final	Semi Final	Goodall Cup Final	Name	Points
2022	Played in 14 exhibition games in the lead up to introduction to AIHL regular season in 2023^{1}
2023	26	9	–	15	1	1	156	136	+20	30	6th	1	0	1	3	8	Play-in	Lost 3-8 (Mustangs)	–	–	(Canada) Jordan McTaggart	47
2024	30	9	–	16	4	1	85	124	-39	36	7th	1	0	1	0	5	Prelim-finalist	Lost 0-5 (Ice)	–	–	(Canada) Mitchell Dyck	35
2025	28	11	–	11	1	5	131	157	-26	40	5th	1	0	1	1	6	Prelim-finalist	Lost 1-8 (Northstars)	–	–	(Canada) Tanner Hopps	80
2026	–	–	–	–	–	–	–	–	–	–	–	–	–	–	–	–	–	–	–	–	–	–
Totals	84	29	–	42	6	7	372	417	-45			3	0	3	4	19

^{1} Exhibition record: 14 games, 7 wins, 7 losses (2 in overtime), 81 goals scored, 65 goals conceded. 2 additional games were cancelled in the final week of August 2022 and 1 game was abandoned mid-game.

Champions	Runners-up	Third place

== Players ==
=== Current roster ===
Team roster for the 2026 AIHL season

Brisbane Lightning roster - 2026 AIHL season
Active roster		Inactive roster	Coaching staff
Goaltenders: 31 (Australia) Jakob Doornbos; 37 (Australia) Ethan Meyer; 41 (Canada) Steve Harris; 70 (Australia) Dillon Dewar; Defencemen: 12 (Australia) Mikko Rippon; 13 (Canada) Zach Shankar (I); 15 (Australia) Thomas Kiliwnik; 17 (Australia) Luka Ouimette; 22 (Canada) Alex Campbell (I); 26 (Australia) Neil Pretorius; 44 (Australia) Ozzy Partridge; 51 (France) Pierrick Hoehe (I); 55 (Canada) Eric Walker (I); 72 (Australia) Onrii Dalgity; 77 (Australia) Hunter Boland; 81 (Australia) Alex de Graaf	Forwards: 7 (Australia) Pat Girouard; 9 (Australia) Anthony Barnes; 18 (Australia) Arum Rapchuk; 19 (Australia) Jackson Staneke; 20 (Australia) Harley Anderson; 21 (Australia) Hugh Campbell; 24 (United States) Aaron Wanat (C); 27 (Canada) Grant Hebert (I); 28 (Australia) Bryce Hodges; 42 (Canada) Tanner Hopps (A)(I); 47 (Australia) Jack Mollee; 78 (Australia) Sacha Rapchuk (A); 84 (Australia) Julian Fodor; 87 (Mongolia) Batu Gendunov (I); 88 (Australia) Zachery Gumm	2 (Canada) Shai Rabinowitz; 91 (Canada) Josh Labrie	Head Coach: (Canada) Nathan Deyell; Coaches: (Australia) Ivan Rapchuk (GM); Legend (C) Captain (A) Alternate Captain (I) Import player Statistics; Average age: 25.45; Average height: 185.43cm Average weight: 86.89kg Locals: 23; Imports: 7
Last updated on: 18 July 2026
Elite Prospects IHNA

=== Historic rosters ===
Team roster for the 2022 AIHL season exhibition series. The very first Lightning roster ever assembled.

Brisbane Lightning roster - 2022 exhibition games
Active roster		Coaching staff
Goaltenders: 41 (Australia) Steve Harris; 27 (Australia) Cameron Miller; Defencemen: 19 (Australia) Damian Bright (C); 72 (Australia) Onrii Dalgity; 76 (Australia) Quentin Greenwood; 3 (Australia) Tom Harkness; 7 (Australia) Alex Higgins; 4 (Australia) Jay Hodgson; 15 (Australia) Thomas Kiliwnik; -- (Australia) Grady Perlin; 52 (Canada) Sean Savage; 8 (Australia) Lachlan Tripp	Forwards: 9 (Canada) Antoine Aubin; 17 (Australia) Lachlan Clifford; 28 (Australia) Will Clifford; 26 (Canada) Josh Derko; -- (Canada) James Dobrowolski; 3 (Australia) Lachlan Fixter; 84 (Australia) Julian Fodor; 25 (Australia) Alexandre Gracia; -- (Australia) Geoff Hatch; -- (Australia) Matthew Johnson; 29 (Canada) Dylan Kendrick (A); 91 (Canada) Josh Labrie; 10 (Canada) Eamon McKay; 18 (Australia) Arum Rapchuk; 78 (Australia) Sacha Rapchuk; 11 (Australia) Vesa Silvennoinen; -- (United Kingdom) Jordan Smith; 14 (Canada) Eric Speedie (A); 94 (Australia) Reino Uusi-Hakimo; 64 (United States) Aaron Wanat	Head Coach: (Australia) Terry Kiliwnik; Coaches: (Australia) Ivan Rapchuk (AC); (Australia) Julie Haidley-Fixter (OM); (Australia) Olivia Pickard (TR); Legend (C) Captain (A) Alternate Captain (I) Import player Statistics; Average age: TBD; Average height: TBD; Average weight: TBD; Locals: TBD; Imports: TBD
Last updated on: 31 January 2023
Elite Prospects IHNA

Team roster for the 2023 AIHL season, Lighting's maiden full season.

Brisbane Lightning roster - 2023 AIHL season
Active roster		Coaching staff
Goaltenders: -- (Australia) Glen Forbes-White (NF); 41 (Australia) Steve Harris; 31 (Australia) Nicholas Novysedlak; 30 (Australia) Jaden Pine-Murphy; Defencemen: 19 (Australia) Damian Bright (C); 72 (Australia) Onrii Dalgity; 11 (Australia) Christian Fuschini; 55 (Canada) Alexis Girard (I); 4 (Australia) Jay Hodgson; 15 (Australia) Thomas Kiliwnik; 77 (Canada) David Nelson (I); 26 (Australia) Neil Pretorius; 5 (Australia) Mikko Rippon; 6 (United States) Maxwell Roth (I); 8 (Australia) Lachlan Tripp	Forwards: 20 (Australia) Harley Anderson; 9 (Australia) Anthony Barnes; 12 (Australia) Aiden Catakovic; 17 (Australia) Lachlan Clifford; 28 (Australia) Will Clifford; -- (Australia) Alexander Dvinyaninov (TFR); 84 (Australia) Julian Fodor; 3 (Australia) Tom Harkness; 7 (Australia) Alexander Higgins (A); 25 (Canada) Kasey Kulczycki (I); 91 (Australia) Josh Labrie; 39 (Canada) Jordan McTaggart (I); 10 (Hungary) Patrik Popovics (I); 18 (Australia) Arum Rapchuk; 78 (Australia) Sacha Rapchuk; 2 (Australia) Anthony Santilli; 14 (Australia) Eric Speedie (A); 24 (Australia) Aaron Wanat	Head Coach: (Australia) Terry Kiliwnik; Coaches: (Australia) Ivan Rapchuk (AC); (Australia) Eamon McKay (AC); (Australia) Chantelle Rapchuk (TM); (Australia) Peter Holmes (GM); (Australia) Julie Haidley-Fixter (OM); Legend (C) Captain (A) Alternate Captain (I) Import player Statistics; Average age: 26.6; Average height: 184.4; Average weight: 84.7; Locals: 24; Imports: 6
Last updated on: 26 June 2023
Elite Prospects IHNA

== Team staff ==
Current as of 2024 AIHL season.

Lightning staff
Role	Name
Head coach	(Australia) Terry Kiliwnik
Associate coach	(Canada) Mike Sirant
Assistant coach	(Canada) Josh Derko
Assistant coach	(Australia) Eamon McKay
Player development coach	(Australia) Jordan Landy
Team manager	(Australia) Chantelle Rapchuk
General manager	(Australia) Ivan Rapchuk
Operations Manager	(Australia) Julie Haidley-Fixter
Director of Marketing	(Australia) Ash Jackson

== Leaders ==
=== Team captains ===
The Lightning have had a total of one captain in the team's history.

No.	Name	Term
1	(Australia) Damian Bright	2022–23
2	No appointed captain	2024–Present

=== Head coaches ===
Brisbane have had a total of one head coach in the team's history.

No.	Name	Term
1	(Australia) Terry Kiliwnik	2022–Present

=== General managers ===
The Lightning have had two general managers in the team's history.

No.	Name	Term
1	(Australia) Josh Labrie	2022
2	(Australia) Peter Holmes	2022–24
3	(Australia) Ivan Rapchuk	2024–Present

== Broadcasting ==
Current:

- AIHL.TV (2023 - present) – Worldwide paid subscription-based online video broadcasting published by the AIHL in partnership with the Clutch.TV platform using local production companies at each team's rink. The service went live in April 2023, and would cover every AIHL regular season and finals games live and on demand.
- Sportradar (2023 - present) – International online video broadcasting in North America and Europe as part of a league-wide 3-year deal signed in March 2022 in the lead up to the 2022 AIHL season.

Former:

- Kayo Sports (2022) – Domestic online video broadcasting in Australia as part of the league wide deal struck in the lead up to the 2022 AIHL season to show every AIHL game live.
