= Adelaide Generals =

- City: Adelaide, South Australia, Australia
- League: Australian Junior Ice Hockey League
- Founded: 2 September 2015
- Home arena: Ice Arena
- Colours: (2015–present)
- Owner: Ice Hockey South Australia
- General manager: (Australia) Jason Gyer
- Head coach: Neil Boyle
- Captain: Ryan Foll

Franchise history
- 2015–present: Adelaide Generals

Championships
- Regular season titles: 2 (2018), (2019)
- AJIHL Championships: 1 (2017)

The Adelaide Generals are an Australian junior ice hockey team based in Adelaide, South Australia playing in the second tier of the Australian Junior Ice Hockey League referred to as AJIHL Tier 2. They represent the first junior ice hockey team from South Australia as part of the proposed 2nd expansion of the AJIHL, which is the most elite level for ice hockey at a national level for ages between 16–20 years old.

== Team history ==
South Australia began posting recruitment for a team into the AJIHL as early as 16 March 2014 when a poster for tryouts was announced via a social media account stating try outs were to begin on 30 March 2014 in preparation for the 2014–15 AJIHL season.

At the beginning of the 2015–16 AJIHL season, a proposal for the next expansion in the AJIHL was made by Ice Hockey Australia to include teams from the Australian states of Queensland and South Australia and the Australian Capital Territory. A Wild Card entry was created in the AJIHL playoffs structure but no further public information would be made available for months but plans to form junior teams in each of these states was underway.

At 18:00 on 21 January 2016, the official announcement of the AJIHL Tier 2 competition was made and details of the team roster and competition times were released.

== Players ==
=== Current roster ===
#	Nat	Name	Pos	Shoots	Date of birth	Acquired	Reference
3	(Australia)	Dylan Pope	F	Right	29 September 1998	2015	
12	(Australia)	Marcel McGuiness	F	Right	27 July 1999	2015	
16	(Australia)	Aaron Grubb	F	Right	15 November 1998	2015	
18	(Australia)	Nick Ruffino	F	Right	11 September 1997	2015	
24	(Australia)	Damon Hoad				2015	
5	(Australia)	Kyle Clark				2015	
51	(Australia)	Taylor Ewers				2015	
55	(Australia)	Rory Hellwig				2015	
63	(Australia)	Ryan Foll	F	Left		2015	
75	(New Zealand)	Ambrose Foster	F	Right	5 March 1999	2015	
6	(Australia)	Zach Boyle	D	Left	12 May 1996	2015	
83	(Australia)	Jordan Geyer	F	Right	26 October 1997	2015	
87	(Australia)	Brandon Taylor		Left		2015	
90	(Australia)	Theodore Fabijan		Left		2015	
45	(Australia)	Charlie Wragg	G		10 February 1999	2015	
78	(Australia)	Tyler Duchene	G	Catch Left		2015	

=== Captains ===
The first captain for the Adelaide Generals was Ryan Foll

- 2015–16 Ryan Foll (C), Marcel McGuiness (A), Zach Boyle (A)
- 2016–17 Ryan Foll (C), Remy McGuiness (A), Zach Boyle (A)

== Head coaches ==
The first head coach for the Adelaide Generals was Neil Boyle.

- 2015–16 Neil Boyle
- 2016–17 Neil Boyle

== See also ==
- Australian Junior Ice Hockey League
- Melbourne Glaciers
- Melbourne Whalers
- Perth Pelicans
- Sydney Sabres
- Sydney Wolf Pack
- Ice Hockey Australia
- Ice Hockey New South Wales
- Australian Women's Ice Hockey League
- Australian Ice Hockey League
- Jim Brown Trophy
- Goodall Cup
- Joan McKowen Memorial Trophy
