= Brisbane Blitz =

- City: Brisbane, Queensland, Australia
- League: Australian Junior Ice Hockey League
- Founded: 2 September 2015
- Home arena: Iceworld Acacia Ridge
- Colours: (2015–16) (2016–present)
- Owner(s): Ice Hockey Queensland
- General manager: (Australia) Jacinta Santilli
- Head coach: Darryl Dunsford

Franchise history
- 2015–present: Brisbane Blitz

Championships
- Regular season titles: 0
- AJIHL Championships: 0

The Brisbane Blitz are an Australian junior ice hockey team based in Brisbane, Queensland playing in the second tier of the Australian Junior Ice Hockey League referred to as AJIHL Tier 2. They represent the first junior ice hockey team from Queensland as part of the proposed 2nd expansion of the AJIHL, which is the most elite level for ice hockey at a national level for ages between 16–20 years old.

== Team history ==
At the beginning of the 2015–16 AJIHL season, a proposal for the next expansion in the AJIHL was made by Ice Hockey Australia to include teams from the Australian states of Queensland and South Australia and the Australian Capital Territory. A Wild Card entry was created in the AJIHL playoffs structure but no further public information would be made available for months but plans to form junior teams in each of these states was underway.

On 2 September 2015 a public announcement was made via the Southern Stars Ice Hockey of the decision to include a Queensland team as part of a new AJIHL Tier 2 competition. The first proposed games were to take place in Sydney on 5–6 December 2015. The team would undergo a 4-week training and development clinic, at the Acacia Ridge ice rink, run by Con Dionissiou (Ice Hockey Queensland President) and Darryl Dunsford (Southern Stars President) in September 2015.

The Brisbane Blitz began by playing their first exhibition game under the name Brisbane AJIHL at 5:15 pm on 12 December 2015 against a Brisbane All Stars team consisting of Southern Stars Ice Hockey players and Boondall Buccaneers players. The game was played at Iceworld Olympic Ice Rink in Boondall.

The Brisbane Blitz played in Canberra at the first AJIHL Tier 2 tournament in January 2016 against Canberra Junior Brave and Adelaide Generals. The Blitz won this tournament and therefore were selected as a Wild Card in the Tier 1 Finals which are being held 27–28 February 2016.

On 20 November 2016 the Brisbane Blitz team was selected for the 2016-17 AJIHL season, where the team would join regular season competition for the first time. Blitz goaltender Imogen Perry became the first female to play in the Australian Junior Ice Hockey League on 17 December 2016. The 16-year-old faced 38 shots on goal against the previous years champion Sydney Sabres, winning 7 – 1 in her debut.

The first team in club history:

| # | Nat | Name | Pos | Shoots | Date of birth | Acquired | Reference |
|---|---|---|---|---|---|---|---|
| 3 | (Australia) | Mitchell Henning | F | Right | 2 November 1997 | 2015 | |
| 4 | (Australia) | Nick Scanlan | D | Left | 17 January 1997 | 2015 | |
| 8 | (Australia) | Lachlan Tripp | D | Left | 6 February 1999 | 2015 | |
| 10 | (Australia) | Conar Peace | F | Right | 30 November 1999 | 2015 | |
| 11 | (Australia) | Damon de Ryck | F | Right | 11 September 1997 | 2015 | |
| 12 | (Australia) | Matthew de Beer | F | Right | 30 November 1999 | 2015 | |
| 13 | (Australia) | Leon Coleman | F | Right | 30 November 1999 | 2015 | |
| 14 | (Australia) | John Kenderdine | F | Right | 30 November 1999 | 2015 | |
| 15 | (Australia) | Luke Moore | D | Right | 30 November 1999 | 2015 | |
| 20 | (Australia) | Harley Anderson | F | Right | 30 November 1999 | 2015 | |
| 21 | (New Zealand) | Vaughan Lok Christie | F | Right | 30 November 1999 | 2015 | |
| 22 | (Australia) | Brandon Brotton | F | Right | 30 November 1999 | 2015 | |
| 33 | (Australia) | Matthew Wray | F | Right | 30 November 1999 | 2015 | |
| 35 | (Australia) | Henri Mousset | F | Right | 21 June 1999 | 2015 | |
| 76 | (Australia) | Isaac Norris | D | Left | 21 April 1998 | 2015 | |
| 58 | (Australia) | Luke Murphy | F | Right | 3 June 1996 | 2015 | |
| 97 | (Australia) | Anthony Santilli | F | Right | 6 May 1997 | 2015 | |
| 98 | (Australia) | Matt Gilpin | F | Right | 30 November 1999 | 2015 | |
| 1 | (Australia) | Joe Moore | G | Right | 25 January 1997 | 2015 | |

== Players ==
=== Captains ===
- 2015–16 Mitchell Henning (C), Luke Moore (A), Harley Anderson (A)
- 2016–17 Mitchell Henning (C), Matthew Gilpin (A), Harley Anderson (A)

== Head coaches ==
The first Head Coach for the Brisbane Blitz was Con Dionissiou.

- 2015–16 Con Dionissiou
- 2016–17 Darryl Dunsford

== See also ==
- Australian Junior Ice Hockey League
- Melbourne Glaciers
- Melbourne Whalers
- Perth Pelicans
- Sydney Sabres
- Sydney Wolf Pack
- Ice Hockey Australia
- Ice Hockey New South Wales
- Australian Women's Ice Hockey League
- Australian Ice Hockey League
- Jim Brown Trophy
- Goodall Cup
- Joan McKowen Memorial Trophy
