= 2016–17 AJIHL season =

- League: Australian Junior Ice Hockey League
- Sport: Ice hockey
- Duration: 17 December 2016 – 2 April 2017
- Teams: 6

Regular season
- Top scorer: Ryan Foll

AJIHL Champions Trophy
- Champions: Adelaide Generals
- Runners-up: Perth Sharks

AJIHL seasons
- 2015–16 2017–18

The 2016–17 AJIHL season is the fifth season of the Australian Junior Ice Hockey League. It will run from 17 December 2016 until a yet to be determined date in 2017, with the formal structure of the league having been changed to incorporate 3 additional teams, each from a different state or territory. The AJIHL is the highest Australian national junior ice hockey competition.

== League business ==
Ice Hockey Australia made the announcement that the Australian Junior Ice Hockey League would be expanding in the 2016–17 season. It planned to include teams from Queensland, South Australia and Australian Capital Territory into the regular season format after the previous season using a Tier 2 tournament for the 3 new teams. Due to cost of travel after adding 3 additional cities to the league, the season format was changed to a multiple weekend tournament format and the league was divided into 2 conferences. Two other issues faced at the beginning of the season were that there was no ice availability reserved in Melbourne, Victoria to schedule games for the Melbourne Glaciers and Adelaide was again experiencing issues with its main rink cooling system. With the first schedule originally announced and ready for December, the Canberra Junior Brave pulled out of the weekend and it is unknown if they would return later in 2017 in a future weekend tournament. With a shrinking junior talent pool in Melbourne, the Melbourne Whalers suspended operations for the 2016–17 season, leaving only the Melbourne Glaciers to participate. The Perth Pelicans would also suspend operations for the 2016–17 season, leaving the Perth Sharks as the only representation for junior talent in Western Australia.

== Exhibition Games ==
Exhibition games were planned for both the Sydney Sabres and the Sydney Wolf Pack to keep the teams active as neither team had any training sessions allocated for them to use. These games did not count as regular season games.

=== February ===
Game	Date	Time	Away	Score	Home	Location	Attendance	Recap
13	5 February 2017	17:00	Sydney Sabres	2 - 0	Sydney Wolf Pack	Penrith Ice Palace	-	
14	11 February 2017	17:00	Sydney Wolf Pack	4 - 3 (SO)	Sydney Sabres	Penrith Ice Palace	-	
15	12 February 2017	17:00	Sydney Sabres	1 - 2	Sydney Wolf Pack	Penrith Ice Palace	-	

== Regular season ==
The regular season began on 15 December 2016 and will run as a weekend style tournament format for 2017.

=== December ===
Game	Date	Time	Away	Score	Home	Location	Attendance	Recap
1	15 December 2016	19:15	Sydney Sabres	5 - 4	Sydney Wolf Pack	Penrith Ice Palace	-	
2	16 December 2016	15:15	Sydney Sabres	1 - 9	Brisbane Blitz	Penrith Ice Palace	-	
3	17 December 2016	06:45	Brisbane Blitz	4 - 1	Sydney Wolf Pack	Penrith Ice Palace	-	
4	17 December 2016	17:00	Brisbane Blitz	7 - 1	Sydney Sabres	Penrith Ice Palace	-	
5	18 December 2016	07:30	Sydney Wolf Pack	6 - 5 (SO)	Brisbane Blitz	Penrith Ice Palace	-	
6	18 December 2016	17:00	Sydney Wolf Pack	5 - 2	Sydney Sabres	Penrith Ice Palace	-	

=== January ===
Game	Date	Time	Away	Score	Home	Location	Attendance	Recap
7	26 January 2017	15:00	Adelaide Generals	10 - 2	Melbourne Glaciers	Cockburn Ice Arena	-	
8	27 January 2017	11:15	Melbourne Glaciers	6 - 3	Perth Sharks	Cockburn Ice Arena	-	
9	27 January 2017	18:15	Perth Sharks	0 - 8	Adelaide Generals	Cockburn Ice Arena	-	
10	28 January 2017	11:15	Adelaide Generals	9 - 1	Melbourne Glaciers	Cockburn Ice Arena	-	
11	28 January 2017	14:00	Melbourne Glaciers	1 - 3	Perth Sharks	Cockburn Ice Arena	-	
12	29 January 2017	07:00	Perth Sharks	4 - 5	Adelaide Generals	Perth Ice Arena	-	

=== March ===
Game	Date	Time	Away	Score	Home	Location	Attendance	Recap
13	30 March 2017	17:45	Sydney Sabres		Adelaide Generals	IceArenA	-	
14	30 March 2017	19:30	Perth Sharks		Brisbane Blitz	IceArenA	-	
15	31 March 2017	7:15	Melbourne Glaciers		Sydney Sabres	IceArenA	-	
16	31 March 2017	10:45	Sydney Wolf Pack		Adelaide Generals	IceArenA	-	
17	31 March 2017	12:30	Brisbane Blitz		Melbourne Glaciers	IceArenA	-	
18	31 March 2017	14:15	Perth Sharks		Sydney Wolf Pack	IceArenA	-	
19	31 March 2017	17:45	Brisbane Blitz		Adelaide Generals	IceArenA	-	

=== April ===
Game	Date	Time	Away	Score	Home	Location	Attendance	Recap
20	1 April 2017	6:00	Sydney Sabres		Perth Sharks	IceArenA	-	
21	1 April 2017	7:45	Sydney Wolf Pack		Melbourne Glaciers	IceArenA	-	

== Standings ==
Note: GP = Games played; W = Wins; SW = Shootout Wins; SL = Shootout losses; L = Losses; GF = Goals for; GA = Goals against; GDF = Goal differential; PTS = Points

The regular season league standings are as follows:

Team	GP	W	SW	SL	L	GF	GA	GDF	PTS
Adelaide Generals	4	4	0	0	0	32	7	25	12
Brisbane Blitz	4	3	0	1	0	25	9	16	10
Sydney Wolf Pack	4	1	1	0	2	16	16	0	5
Perth Sharks	4	1	0	0	3	10	20	-10	3
Melbourne Glaciers	4	1	0	0	3	10	25	-15	3
Sydney Sabres	4	1	0	0	3	9	25	-16	3
