= Perth Sharks =

- City: Perth, Western Australia, Australia
- League: Australian Junior Ice Hockey League
- Founded: 2013
- Home arena: Xtreme Ice Arena
- Colours: (2013-2014) (2014-present)
- Owner(s): Western Australian Ice Hockey Association
- General manager: (Australia) Gill McLean
- Head coach: (Australia) Markus Frankenberger
- Captain: (Australia) Alastair Punler

Franchise history
- 2013–present: Perth Sharks

Championships
- Regular season titles: 1 (2015)
- AJIHL Championships: 0

The Perth Sharks are an Australian junior ice hockey team based in Perth, Western Australia playing in the Australian Junior Ice Hockey League. They represent one of the two junior ice hockey teams from Western Australia currently playing in the AJIHL, which is the most elite level for ice hockey at a national level for ages between 16–20 years old.

== Team history ==
Tryouts for the new Perth Sharks team began on 2 September 2014 with a mandatory fitness assessment, held on 2 September 2014 at Kingsway Christian College, and two ice sessions.

The Perth Sharks played their first Australian Junior Ice Hockey League game on Monday October 21, 2013 against the Perth Pelicans. The Sharks team included national draft players Remy McGuiness from South Australia, Anthony Barnes and Jordan Millen from Queensland.

== Logo and uniform ==
=== 2013-2014 ===
The follow-up season in the Australian Junior Ice Hockey League saw a lot of change via expansion and renaming of its existing teams. The changes were made in response to the National Hockey Leagues concern about the AJIHL using their team names and logos but also recognised the opportunity to create a new history for the teams through creating their own identity. In October 2013 the league expanded to six teams with two teams from Perth, the Sharks and the Pelicans, joining for the start of the 2013–14 season.

== Players ==
=== Current roster ===
For the 2015–16 AJIHL season

#	Nat	Name	Pos	Date of birth	Acquired
2	(Australia)	Tomek Sak	F	26 June 1995	2013
4	(Australia)	Brad Campbell	F	17 March 1995	2013
13	(Australia)	Alastair Punler	D	12 February 1996	2013
16	(Australia)	Benedik Stolze	F	26 July 1996	2013
17	(Australia)	Bruno Stolze	F	26 July 1996	2013
23	(Australia)	Connor Knapman	D	2 May 1998	2014
24	(Australia)	Harry Tanner	F	13 July 1998	2014
25	(Australia)	Benjamin Kelly	F	17 March 1996	2015
26	(Australia)	Adam Sheppard	D	3 June 1998	2015
28	(China)	Oscar Zhu	F	4 May 1999	2015
29	(Australia)	Charlie Tennant	F	12 April 1998	2015
31	(United Kingdom)	Adam Bridge	F	2 March 1999	2015
32	(Australia)	Sean McLean	F	7 March 1998	2014
33	(Australia)	Kevin Mateiu	F	10 August 1995	2015
36	(Australia)	Kym White	D	4 April 1995	2014
20	(Australia)	Mark McCann	G	18 November 1995	2013
10	(Australia)	Hayden Stobbs	G	12 June 1998	2015

=== Captains ===
- 2013-14
- 2014-15 James Woodman (C), Tomek Sak (A), Alastair Punler (A)
- 2015-16 Alastair Punler (C), Tomek Sak (A), Bruno Stolze (A)
- 2016-17 Alastair Punler (C), Ryan Smyth (A), Jamie Campbell (A)

== Head coaches ==
The first head coach for the Perth Sharks was Mike Johnston.

- 2013-14 Mike Johnston
- 2014-15 David Ruck
- 2015-16 David Ruck
- 2016-17 Markus Frankenberger

== See also ==
- Australian Junior Ice Hockey League
- Melbourne Glaciers
- Melbourne Whalers
- Perth Pelicans
- Sydney Sabres
- Sydney Wolf Pack
- Ice Hockey Australia
- Ice Hockey New South Wales
- Australian Women's Ice Hockey League
- Australian Ice Hockey League
- Jim Brown Trophy
- Goodall Cup
- Joan McKowen Memorial Trophy
