= 2015–16 AJIHL season =

- League: Australian Junior Ice Hockey League
- Sport: Ice hockey
- Duration: 29 October 2015 – 28 February 2016
- Number of games: 13
- Number of teams: 6

Regular season
- Premiers: Melbourne Glaciers
- Top scorer: Caleb Butler

AJIHL Champions Trophy
- Champions: Sydney Sabres
- Runners-up: Melbourne Glaciers

AJIHL seasons
- ← 2014–15 2016–17 →

The 2015–16 AJIHL season is the fourth season of the Australian Junior Ice Hockey League. It ran from 29 October 2015 until 21 February 2016, with the finals running from 27 February 2016 until 28 February 2016. The AJIHL is the highest Australian national junior ice hockey competition.

== League business ==
Ice Hockey Australia made the announcement that the Australian Junior Ice Hockey League would be expanding in the 2015–16 season. It planned to include teams from Queensland, South Australia and Australian Capital Territory. This did not happen, however, and the league remains at 6 teams.

On 21 January it was announced that an "AJIHL Tier 2" tournament would take place, involving a state team representing Queensland, Australian Capital Territory and South Australia. This tournament gives one of these teams a chance to enter into the AJIHL finals as a wild card team. The team names are: Brisbane Blitz, Canberra Junior Brave and Adelaide Generals.

Tournament Format When ice time is available, the first 2 periods are 15 mins running time and the third period is stop time. These games are indicated on the schedule by having 1.5 hrs. The ice is to be resurfaced between the 2nd & 3rd period of each game. When a game cannot have the 3rd period as stop time, the last 5 mins of the 3rd period is stop time, these games are indicated by 1.0hr. Games that result in a tied score go straight to penalty shootout.
Game points will be applied as follows:
a) Win = 3 points
b) Shootout win = 2 points
c) Shootout loss = 1 point
d) Tie = 1 point
e) Loss = 0 points
The top 2 teams at the end of the round robin will play a final with the winning team receiving the wild card entry into the AJIHL finals.

The tournament is held in Phillip Ice Skating Centre.

== Regular season ==
The regular season will begin on 29 October 2015 and ran through to 21 February 2015 before the teams compete in the playoff series.

=== October ===
Game	Date	Time	Away	Score	Home	Location	Attendance	Recap
1	29 October 2015	20:00	Melbourne Whalers	4 – 3 (SO)	Melbourne Glaciers	Melbourne	-	
2	31 October 2015	18:15	Sydney Wolf Pack	4 - 2	Sydney Sabres	Penrith	-	

=== November ===
Game	Date	Time	Away	Score	Home	Location	Attendance	Recap
3	1 November 2015	17:00	Sydney Sabres	2 - 3	Sydney Wolf Pack	Penrith	-	
4	1 November 2015	18:45	Perth Pelicans	4 - 1	Perth Sharks	Mirrabooka	-	
5	5 November 2015	20:00	Melbourne Glaciers	5 - 2	Melbourne Whalers	Melbourne	-	
6	7 November 2015	13:15	Sydney Wolf Pack	6 - 2	Melbourne Whalers	Melbourne	-	
7	7 November 2015	15:00	Sydney Sabres	1 - 5	Melbourne Glaciers	Melbourne	-	
8	7 November 2015	18:30	Perth Sharks	3 - 2 (SO)	Perth Pelicans	Mirrabooka	-	
9	8 November 2015	15:30	Sydney Sabres	3 - 0	Melbourne Whalers	Melbourne	-	
10	8 November 2015	17:15	Sydney Wolf Pack	1 - 5	Melbourne Glaciers	Melbourne	-	
11	14 November 2015	18:30	Perth Pelicans	3 - 1	Perth Sharks	Mirrabooka	-	
12	15 November 2015	20:00	Sydney Wolf Pack	1 - 5	Sydney Sabres	Penrith	-	
13	21 November 2015	18:30	Perth Sharks	4 - 2	Perth Pelicans	Mirrabooka	-	
14	28 November 2015	15:45	Melbourne Glaciers	7 - 2	Melbourne Whalers	Melbourne	-	
15	29 November 2015	18:00	Perth Pelicans	5 - 4	Perth Sharks	Mirrabooka	-	

=== December ===
Game	Date	Time	Away	Score	Home	Location	Attendance	Recap
16	5 December 2015	18:15	Perth Pelicans	3 - 6	Sydney Sabres	Penrith	-	
17	5 December 2015	18:00	Perth Sharks	5 - 1	Melbourne Whalers	Melbourne	-	
18	6 December 2015	08:30	Perth Pelicans	4 - 5	Sydney Wolf Pack	Penrith	-	
19	6 December 2015	15:00	Perth Sharks	1 - 3	Melbourne Glaciers	Melbourne	-	
20	12 December 2015	16:30	Melbourne Glaciers	3 - 2	Perth Pelicans	Mirrabooka	-	
21	12 December 2015	18:00	Melbourne Whalers	2 - 4	Perth Sharks	Mirrabooka	-	
22	13 December 2015	11:45	Melbourne Whalers	1 - 5	Perth Pelicans	Mirrabooka	-	
23	13 December 2015	10:00	Melbourne Glaciers	4 - 1	Perth Sharks	Mirrabooka	-	
24	13 December 2015	19:30	Sydney Sabres	3 - 4	Sydney Wolf Pack	Penrith	-	
25	19 December 2015	13:15	Melbourne Glaciers	4 - 2	Melbourne Whalers	Melbourne	-	

=== January ===
Game	Date	Time	Away	Score	Home	Location	Attendance	Recap
26	22 January 2016	9:30	Melbourne Whalers	0 - 4	Melbourne Glaciers	Melbourne	-	
27	28 January 2016	20:00	Melbourne Glaciers	6 - 0	Melbourne Whalers	Melbourne	-	
28	29 January 2016	19:45	Perth Sharks	3 - 4 (SO)	Perth Pelicans	Cockburn Ice Arena	-	
29	30 January 2016	17:00	Sydney Sabres	4 - 2	Sydney Wolf Pack	Penrith	-	
30	31 January 2016	09:00	Sydney Wolf Pack	1 - 2	Sydney Sabres	Penrith	-	

=== February ===
Game	Date	Time	Away	Score	Home	Location	Attendance	Recap
31	6 February 2016	4:30	Sydney Wolf Pack	4 - 3 (SO)	Perth Sharks	Mirrabooka	-	
32	6 February 2016	18:15	Sydney Sabres	5 - 1	Perth Pelicans	Mirrabooka	-	
33	7 February 2016	9:00	Sydney Wolf Pack	6 - 1	Perth Pelicans	Cockburn Ice Arena	-	
34	7 February 2016	10:45	Sydney Sabres	3 - 0	Perth Sharks	Cockburn Ice Arena	-	
35	12 February 2016	19:45	Perth Pelicans	5 - 2	Perth Sharks	Cockburn Ice Arena	-	
36	13 February 2016	17:00	Melbourne Whalers	0 - 6	Sydney Wolf Pack	Penrith	-	
37	13 February 2016	18:45	Melbourne Glaciers	5 - 6 (SO)	Sydney Sabres	Penrith	-	
38	14 February 2016	8:30	Melbourne Whalers	0 - 4	Sydney Sabres	Penrith	-	
39	14 February 2016	17:00	Melbourne Glaciers	1 - 5	Sydney Wolf Pack	Penrith	-	

== Standings ==
Note: GP = Games played; W = Wins; SW = Shootout Wins; SL = Shootout losses; L = Losses; GF = Goals for; GA = Goals against; GDF = Goal differential; PTS = Points

The regular season league standings are as follows:

Team	GP	W	SW	SL	L	GF	GA	GDF	PTS
Melbourne Glaciers	13	10	0	2	1	55	27	+28	31
Sydney Sabres	13	8	1	0	4	46	29	+17	26
Sydney Wolf Pack	13	8	1	0	4	48	34	+14	26
Perth Pelicans	13	5	1	1	6	41	44	-3	18
Perth Sharks	13	3	1	2	7	32	42	-10	13
Melbourne Whalers	13	0	1	0	12	16	62	-46	2

== Scoring leaders ==
Note: GP = Games played; G = Goals; A = Assists; Pts = Points; PIM = Penalty minutes

Player	Team	GP	G	A	Pts	PIM
Caleb Butler	Melbourne Glaciers	10	19	10	29	0
Corey Stringer	Melbourne Glaciers	13	11	11	22	4
Liam Manwarring	Sydney Sabres	12	11	9	20	46
Jordan Grover	Perth Pelicans	13	5	14	19	8
Bayley Kubara	Sydney Wolf Pack	13	10	8	18	28
Jonathan Spalding	Perth Pelicans	13	11	5	16	4
Bruno Stolze	Perth Sharks	13	8	8	16	2
Ben Stolze	Perth Sharks	13	5	11	16	10
Ellessee Carini	Sydney Sabres	12	9	6	15	30
David Mahood	Perth Pelicans	13	8	7	15	6

== Leading goaltenders ==
Note: GP = Games played; Mins = Minutes played; W = Wins; L = Losses: OTL = Overtime losses; SL = Shootout losses; GA = Goals Allowed; SO = Shutouts; GAA = Goals against average

Player	Team	GP	Mins	W	L	GA	SO	Sv%	GAA
Dale Tilsted	Sydney Sabres	6	225:00	5	0	4	2	0.920	0.80
Alex Tetrault	Sydney Wolf Pack	3	135:00	2	1	4	0	0.902	1.33
Jack Hayes	Melbourne Glaciers	12	540:00	9	1	23	2	0.905	1.92
Mark McCann	Perth Sharks	8	355:00	1	6	23	0	0.886	2.92
Tyrone Mendoza-Kehlet	Sydney Sabres	9	362:00	3	4	24	1	0.858	2.98

== AJIHL Tier 2 Wild Card Tournament ==
Game	Date	Time	Away	Score	Home	Location	Recap
1	28 January 2016	8:15	Brisbane Blitz	5 - 1	Canberra Junior Brave	Phillip Ice Skating Centre	
2	28 January 2016	12:10	Adelaide Generals	2 - 4	Brisbane Blitz	Phillip Ice Skating Centre	
3	28 January 2016	18:45	Canberra Junior Brave	4 - 3 (SO)	Adelaide Generals	Phillip Ice Skating Centre	
4	29 January 2016	12:10	Canberra Junior Brave	1 - 2	Adelaide Generals	Phillip Ice Skating Centre	
5	29 January 2016	18:45	Brisbane Blitz	5 - 1	Canberra Junior Brave	Phillip Ice Skating Centre	
6	30 January 2016	12:10	Adelaide Generals	3 - 2	Brisbane Blitz	Phillip Ice Skating Centre	

=== AJIHL Tier 2 Tournament Standings ===
Note: GP = Games played; W = Wins; SW = Shootout Wins; SL = Shootout losses; L = Losses; GF = Goals for; GA = Goals against; GDF = Goal differential; PTS = Points

The regular season league standings are as follows:

Team	GP	W	SW	SL	L	GF	GA	GDF	PTS
Brisbane Blitz	4	3	0	0	1	16	7	+9	9
Adelaide Generals	4	2	0	1	1	10	11	-1	7
Canberra Junior Brave	4	0	1	0	3	7	15	-8	2

=== AJIHL Tier 2 Wild Card Championship ===
30 January 2016; 16:00	Brisbane Blitz	3 - 2 (2-0, 3-1, 3-2)	Adelaide Generals	Phillip Ice Skating Centre

Joe Moore	Goalies	Charlie Wragg	Referee: Justin Mendham; Linesmen: Luke Power; Bryce Marshall
6 min	Penalties	8 min	Referee: Justin Mendham; Linesmen: Luke Power; Bryce Marshall
22	Shots	11	Referee: Justin Mendham; Linesmen: Luke Power; Bryce Marshall

== Playoffs ==
=== Western Australia State Semi Final 1 ===
19 February 2016; 19:45	Perth Sharks	1 - 2 (1-1, 1-1, 1-2)	Perth Pelicans	Cockburn Ice Arena

Mark McCann	Goalies	Dathan Pleiter

=== New South Wales State Semi Final 1 ===
20 February 2016; 17:00	Sydney Sabres	4 - 3 (1-1, 2-2, 4-3)	Sydney Wolf Pack	Penrith Ice Palace

Game reference
Dale Tilsted	Goalies	Jonathan Hughes	Referee: Jeff Scott; Linesmen: M. Peruzzo; R. Barton
0 min	Penalties	10 min	Referee: Jeff Scott; Linesmen: M. Peruzzo; R. Barton
24	Shots	25	Referee: Jeff Scott; Linesmen: M. Peruzzo; R. Barton

=== Victoria State Semi Final 1 ===
20 February 2016; 15:45	Melbourne Whalers	1 - 5	Melbourne Glaciers	O'Brien Group Arena

Fraser Ohlson	Goalies	Jack Hayes

=== New South Wales State Semi Final 2 ===
21 February 2016; 17:00	Sydney Wolf Pack	1 - 2 (1-0, 1-0, 1-2)	Sydney Sabres	Penrith Ice Palace

Game reference
Jonathan Hughes	Goalies	Tyrone Mendoza-Kehlet	Referee: K. Unwin; Linesmen: N. Williams; J. Ryan
6 min	Penalties	12 min	Referee: K. Unwin; Linesmen: N. Williams; J. Ryan
25	Shots	37	Referee: K. Unwin; Linesmen: N. Williams; J. Ryan

=== Victoria State Semi Final 2 ===
21 February 2016; 15:45	Melbourne Glaciers	9 - 0 (2-0, 7-0, 9-0)	Melbourne Whalers	O'Brien Group Arena

Game reference
Jack Hayes	Goalies	Fraser Ohlson	Referee: Steve DeWitt; Linesmen: Tommy Roberts; Brendon Waters
4 min	Penalties	29 min	Referee: Steve DeWitt; Linesmen: Tommy Roberts; Brendon Waters
42	Shots	8	Referee: Steve DeWitt; Linesmen: Tommy Roberts; Brendon Waters

=== Western Australia State Semi Final 2 ===
21 February 2016; 18:00	Perth Pelicans	1 - 5 (0-1, 1-4, 1-5)	Perth Sharks	Xtreme Ice Arena

Stephen McCann	Goalies	Mark McCann

=== Semi Final 1 ===
27 February 2016; 5:00pm	Sydney Sabres	5 - 2 (0-0, 3-2, 5-2)	Melbourne Glaciers	Penrith Ice Palace

Tyrone Mendoza-Kehlet	Goalies	Jack Hayes
6 min	Penalties	8 min
31	Shots	25

=== Semi Final 2 ===
27 February 2016; 7:15pm	Brisbane Blitz	1 - 2	Perth Sharks	Penrith Ice Palace

Joe Moore	Goalies	Stephen McCann

=== Qualifying Final ===
28 February 2016; 8:00am	Winner (semi-final 2)	v	Loser (semi-final 1)	Penrith Ice Palace

=== Grand Final ===
28 February 2016; 5:00pm	Melbourne Glaciers	4 - 6 (1-1, 4-4, 4-6)	Sydney Sabres	Penrith Ice Palace

Jack Hayes	Goalies
