= Sydney Sabres =

- City: Sydney, Australia
- League: Australian Junior Ice Hockey League
- Founded: 18 September 2012
- Home arena: Penrith Ice Palace
- Owner(s): New South Wales Ice Hockey Association
- General manager: Paul Kelly
- Head coach: Jason Kvisle
- Captain: Daniel Pataky

Franchise history
- 2012–2013: Sydney Lightning
- 2013–present: Sydney Sabres

Championships
- Regular season titles: 1 (2014)
- AJIHL Championships: 3 (2014), (2016), (2019)

The Sydney Sabres are an Australian junior ice hockey team based in Sydney playing in the Australian Junior Ice Hockey League. They represent one of the two junior ice hockey teams from New South Wales currently playing in the AJIHL, which is the most elite level for ice hockey at a national level for ages between 16–20 years old.

== Team history ==
=== AJIHL ===
The Sydney Lightning were founded 18 September 2012 following the announcement by Ice Hockey Australia of the formation of the Australian Junior Ice Hockey League. The team is controlled by the New South Wales Ice Hockey Association. On 14 October 2012 it was announced that Jason Kvisle as coach for the 2012–13 AJIHL season with Jimmy Dufour as his assistant.

The Sydney Lightning played the first ever AJIHL game against the Melbourne Blackhawks at the Medibank Icehouse on 21 October 2012. The Lightning we defeated by the Blackhawks by a score of 5–3.

The first goal ever scored in the AJIHL was by Daniel Pataky of the Sydney Lightning.

The first team in club history: For the 2012–13 AJIHL season

#	Nat	Name	Pos	Date of birth	Acquired	Birthplace
7		Christian Elaya	F	19 August 1996	2012	
3		Charles Frazer	D	22 August 1995	2012	
8		Jesse Garcia	F	9 June 1994	2012	
20		Rhett Kelly	G	29 June 1994	2012	Sydney, Australia
17		Jackson Knott	D	7 December 1994	2012	
6		Jake Knott	F	21 June 1996	2012	Sydney, Australia
14		Casey Kubara	F	6 April 1996	2012	Sydney, Australia
19		Cian O'Reilly	F	5 June 1995	2012	
5		Daniel Pataky	D	24 January 1996	2012	Liverpool, New South Wales, Australia
25		Harley Quinton-Jones	G	13 May 1995	2012	
11		Yucca Reinecke	F	5 July 1995	2012	Johannesburg, South Africa
18		Hayden Sheard	F	5 March 1996	2012	
9		Chris Shephard	F	24 May 1994	2012	
1		Marco Tomasello	G	6 March 1992	2012	Sydney, Australia
4		Cameron Todd	F	21 July 1994	2012	Sydney, Australia
15		Martin Valdivia	D	21 April 1995	2012	
12		Axel Winton	D	21 July 1994	2012	Sydney, Australia
16		Luke Zvonicek	F	30 August 1996	2012	

=== AJIHL Expansion ===
The follow-up season in the Australian Junior Ice Hockey League saw a lot of change via expansion and renaming of its existing teams. The Sydney Lightning were renamed the Sydney Sabres in September 2013. The changes were made in response to the National Hockey Leagues concern about the AJIHL using their team names and logos but also recognised the opportunity to create a new history for the teams through creating their own identity. In October 2013 the league expanded to six teams with two teams from Perth, the Sharks and the Pelicans, joining for the start of the 2013–14 season.

== Logo and Uniform ==
=== 2012–2013 Sydney Lightning ===
Sydney Lightning used this logo between 2012 and 2013

In their first year, and the inaugural AJIHL season, the Sydney Lightning wore a uniform that resembled the NHL namesake Tampa Bay Lightning. The jersey design and uniform bore close resemblance to the Tampa Bay Lightning design, with the AJIHL logo used for shoulder crests.

== Season-by-season results ==
Season	GP	W	OTW	OTL	L	GF	GA	PTS	Finish	Playoff
2012–13	14	5	3	0	6	45	41	21	3rd	Lost semi-final vs. Sydney Maple Leafs, 2–7

== Players ==
=== Current roster ===
For the 2016–17 AJIHL season

#	Nat	Name	Pos	Date of birth	Acquired
2		Jack Ransome			2016
3		Austin Matthews			2016
5		Hayden Savage			2016
6		Kory Sheridan	F	6 March 1999	2015
7		Charles Yole	D	9 February 1997	2015
8		Aiden Sillato	F	13 October 1999	2015
9		Liam Manwarring	F	11 March 1999	2015
10		Mohak Issar	F	29 October 1999	2015
11		James Barton			2016
12		Jayden Whitbread			2016
13		Joey Gunner			2016
15		Tim Russell	D	20 January 1997	2015
16		Branson Moore	D	20 January 1999	2015
17		Lachlan Good			2016
18		Joshua Kleipas	F	5 November 1998	2015
19		Nick Air	F	13 March 1998	2016
37		Nathan Moncrieff			2016
98		Ellesse Carini	F	4 December 1998	2014
1		Dale Tilsted	G	8 April 1999	2015

=== Captains ===
- 2013–14 Cameron Todd (C), Hayden Sheard (A), Casey Kubara (A)
- 2014–15 Daniel Pataky (C), Joshua Hansen (A), Chris Shepherd (A)
- 2015–16 Daniel Pataky (C)
- 2016–17
- 2017–18

== Head coaches ==
The first Head Coach for the Sydney Lightning in the inaugural year for the AJIHL was Jason Kvisle.

- 2012–13 Jason Kvisle
- 2013–14 Jason Kvisle
- 2014–15 Jason Kvisle
- 2015–16 Jason Kvisle
- 2016–17 Jason Kvisle
- 2017–18 Jason Kvisle

== See also ==
- Australian Junior Ice Hockey League
- Sydney Wolf Pack
- Melbourne Glaciers
- Melbourne Whalers
- Perth Pelicans
- Perth Sharks
- Ice Hockey Australia
- Ice Hockey New South Wales
- Australian Women's Ice Hockey League
- Australian Ice Hockey League
- Jim Brown Trophy
- Goodall Cup
- Joan McKowen Memorial Trophy
