= Sydney Wolf Pack =

- City: Sydney
- League: Australian Junior Ice Hockey League
- Founded: 18 September 2012
- Home arena: Penrith Ice Palace
- Owner(s): New South Wales Ice Hockey Association
- General manager: Miranda Ransome; Nabil Fahmy
- Head coach: Andrew Reynolds; Steve Ransome
- Captain: Dylan Alavert

Franchise history
- 2012–2013: Sydney Maple Leafs
- 2013–present: Sydney Wolf Pack

Championships
- AJIHL Championships: 2 (2013), (2015)

The Sydney Wolf Pack are an Australian junior ice hockey team based in Sydney playing in the Australian Junior Ice Hockey League. They represent one of the two junior ice hockey teams from New South Wales currently playing in the AJIHL, which is the most elite level for ice hockey at a national level for ages between 16–20 years old.

== Team history ==
=== AJIHL ===
The Sydney Maple Leafs were founded 18 September 2012 following the announcement by Ice Hockey Australia of the formation of the Australian Junior Ice Hockey League. The team is controlled by the New South Wales Ice Hockey Association. On 14 October 2012 it was announced that Sydney Bears player Steven Adams and Paul Kelly had signed on as coaches for the 2012–13 AJIHL season.

The first team in club history: For the 2012–13 AJIHL season

#	Nat	Name	Pos	Date of birth	Acquired	Birthplace
19		Saxon Air	F	25 March 1995	2012	Central Coast, New South Wales, Australia
17		Spencer Austin	D	5 March 1992	2012	Hamilton, Ontario, Canada
18		Nolan Barlow	F	16 September 1994	2012	
6		Adrian Braun	F	3 June 1994	2012	
20		Dylan Burgess	G	8 March 1994	2012	
1		Jake Burgess	G	26 June 1994	2012	
13		Scott Clemie	F	16 December 1994	2012	Scunthorpe, England, United Kingdom
9		Sam Cook	D	26 July 1993	2012	Sydney, Australia
12		Dexter Crowe	F	3 June 1996	2012	Sydney, Australia
25		Jonathan Hughes	G	7 June 1995	2012	
5		Chris Johnson	F		2012	
11		James Keating	F	2 March 1992	2012	
16		Tyler Kubara	F	28 November 1994	2012	Wombarra, New South Wales, Australia
15		Samuel Lammert	F	26 July 1994	2012	Gosford, New South Wales, Australia
3		Ilman Lee	D	3 March 1994	2012	
7		Riley Major	D	9 January 1996	2012	
2		Kieran Poole	F	20 February 1996	2012	
8		Cameron Rose	D	28 January 1994	2012	
10		Jayden Ryan	F	21 October 1992	2012	

=== AJIHL expansion ===
The follow-up season in the Australian Junior Ice Hockey League saw a lot of change via expansion and renaming of its existing teams. The Sydney Maple Leafs were renamed the Sydney Wolf Pack in September 2013. The changes were made in response to the National Hockey Leagues concern about the AJIHL using their team names and logos but also recognised the opportunity to create a new history for the teams through creating their own identity. In October 2013 the league expanded to six teams with two teams from Perth, the Sharks and the Pelicans, joining for the start of the 2013–14 season.

== Logo and uniform ==
=== 2012–2013 Sydney Maple Leafs ===
Sydney Maple Leafs used this logo between 2012 and 2013

In their first year, and the inaugural AJIHL season, the Sydney Maple Leafs wore a uniform that resembled the NHL namesake Toronto Maple Leafs. The key difference with the logo design was the exclusion of the word Toronto within the leaf emblem. The jersey design and uniform otherwise bore close resemblance to the Toronto Maple Leaf design, with the AJIHL logo used for shoulder crests.

=== 2013–present Sydney Wolf Pack ===
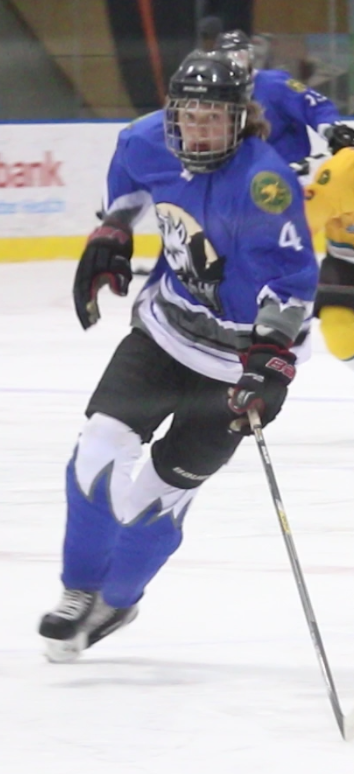
Sydney Wolf Pack uniform 1 March 2015

== Season-by-season results ==
=== 2012 – 2013 ===
In the inaugural season of the Australian Junior Ice Hockey League, the Sydney Wolf Pack began as the Sydney Maple Leafs. The beginning of the regular season saw the team not winning a game with the closest contest being an overtime loss to the Sydney Lightning. The Sydney Maple Leafs would record their first win as a club on 8 December 2012 against the Sydney Lightning in a 2–1 victory. Both goals scored in this historic win were scored by forward Dexter Crowe in the 2nd period about 5 minutes apart.

After starting off without a win, the Sydney Maple Leafs would go on to win 4 out of their last 6 games, one of which was in overtime.

In the post season finals, the Sydney Maple Leafs would continue their improved from by defeating the Sydney Lightning by a convincing 7–2 scoreline in the semi-finals. The finals series would be against the Melbourne Red Wings in a best of 3 format. The Sydney Maple Leafs won the series 2–1 after winning the final game of the series 1–0 from a first period goal by forward Scott Clemie.

Season	GP	W	OTW	SOW	OTL	SOL	L	PTS	GF	GA	Finish
2012–13	14	4	0	0	2	0	8	24	34	52	3rd

Finals	GP	W	OTW	OTL	L	GF	GA	Finish
2013 Finals	4	3	1	0	1	24	9	AJIHL Champions

=== 2013 – 2014 ===
The follow-up season in the Australian Junior Ice Hockey League saw a lot of change via expansion and renaming of its existing teams. The Sydney Maple Leafs were renamed the Sydney Wolf Pack in September 2013. The changes were made in response to the National Hockey Leagues concern about the AJIHL using their team names and logos but also recognised the opportunity to create a new history for the teams through creating their own identity. In October 2013 the league expanded to six teams with two teams from Perth, the Sharks and the Pelicans, joining for the start of the 2013–14 season. The finals format of a best of 3 was discontinued and the league adopted a gold-silver-bronze format which saw the 4th place Sydney Wolf Pack miss out on post season competition.

Season	GP	W	OTW	SOW	OTL	SOL	L	PTS	GF	GA	Finish
2013–14	15	6	0	1	0	1	7	21	45	49	4th

Finals	GP	W	OTW	OTL	L	GF	GA	Finish
2014 Finals	0	0	0	0	0	0	0	Did not play

=== 2014 – 2015 ===
Season	GP	W	OTW	SOW	OTL	SOL	L	PTS	GF	GA	Finish
2014–15	15	7	0	2	0	0	8	24	30	34	4th

Finals	GP	W	OTW	OTL	L	GF	GA	Finish
2015 Finals	2	2	1	0	0	8	7	AJIHL Champions

== Players ==
=== Current roster ===
For the 2016–17 AJIHL season

#	Nat	Name	Pos	Date of birth	Acquired	Birthplace
2		Alex Ross	F		2016	
4		James Urweiss	F		2016	
5		Luke Zvonicek	F	30 August 1996	2015	
6		Dylan Lavery	F		2015	
7		Harry Good	F		2015	
8		Matthew Kopp	D		2016	
9		Alberic Benjamin	F	4 June 2000	2016	Calgary, Alberta, Canada
11		Tom Roberts	D		2015	
12		James Merinoe	D		2016	
13		Lachlan McKenzie	F		2016	
14		Alex Elias	D		2015	
15		Danny Blazevic	D		2015	
16		Luca Tramonte	F		2016	
17		Brendan Kong	F	14 April 1994	2014	
18		Nicholas Weiland	D		2016	
19		Liam Chalker	D		2016	
37		Jake Knott	F	21 June 1996	2013	
1		Ignacy Benjamin	G	15 March 1999	2016	

==== Captains ====
- 2014–15 Scott Clemie (C), Patrick Nadin (A)
- 2015–16 Patrick Nadin (C)
- 2016–17 Jake Knott(C), Luke Zvonicek (A), Brenden Kong (A)

== Head coaches ==
The first head coach for the Sydney Maple Leafs in the inaugural year for the AJIHL was Steven Adams.

- 2012–13 Steven Adams
- 2013–14 Scott Stephenson
- 2014–15 Andrew Reynolds
- 2015–16 Amelia Matheson
- 2016–17 Amelia Matheson

== Awards and trophies ==
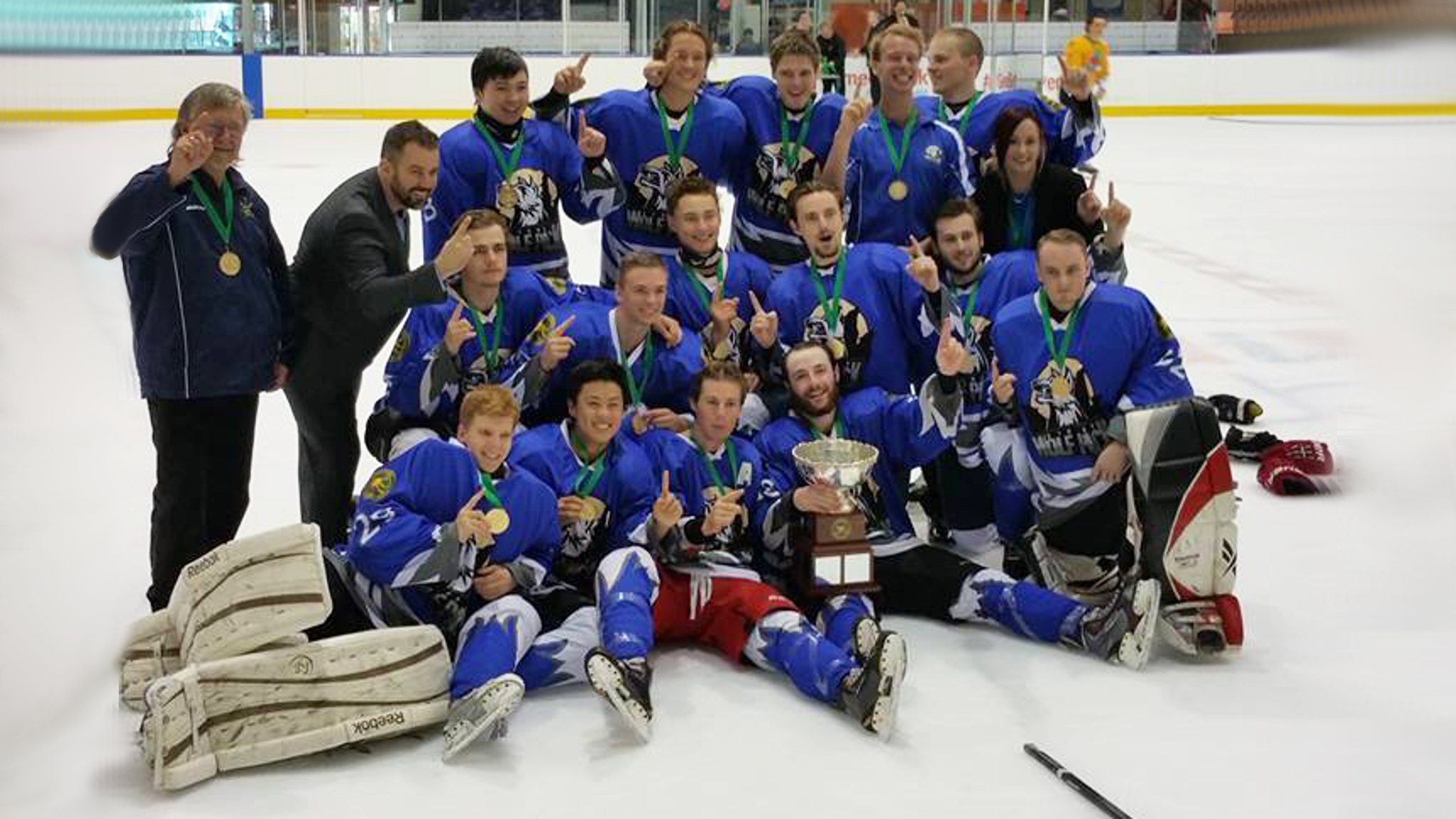
Sydney Wolf Pack AJIHL Championship Team 1 March 2015.

== See also ==
- Australian Junior Ice Hockey League
- Sydney Sabres
- Melbourne Glaciers
- Melbourne Whalers
- Perth Pelicans
- Perth Sharks
- Ice Hockey Australia
- Ice Hockey New South Wales
- Australian Women's Ice Hockey League
- Australian Ice Hockey League
- Jim Brown Trophy
- Goodall Cup
- Joan McKowen Memorial Trophy
