= 2013–14 AJIHL season =

- League: Australian Junior Ice Hockey League
- Sport: Ice hockey
- Duration: 5 October 2013 – 9 March 2014
- Number of games: 15
- Number of teams: 6

Regular season
- Premiers: Sydney Sabres
- Top scorer: Casey Kubara

AJIHL Champions Trophy
- Champions: Sydney Sabres
- Runners-up: Melbourne Whalers

AJIHL seasons
- ← 2012–13 2014–15 →

The 2013–14 AJIHL season is the second season of the Australian Junior Ice Hockey League. It ran from 5 October 2013 until 1 March 2014, with the finals running from 8 March 2014 until 9 March 2014. The AJIHL is the highest Australian national junior ice hockey competition.

== League business ==
On August 22, 2013, it was announced that the Melbourne Red Wings would change their name to the Melbourne Glaciers and the Melbourne Blackhawks would be renamed the Melbourne Whalers, which avoided the close resemblance with the Detroit Red Wings and Chicago Blackhawks of the NHL after the NHL had concerns over breaches of copyright and this allowed the team to develop its own brand identity.

In September 2013 the Sydney Maple Leafs and Sydney Lightning would follow suit with the Melbourne teams and also rename and rebrand their teams to the Sydney Wolf Pack and Sydney Sabres

In October 2013, two additional teams were added to the AJIHL from Perth, Western Australia. The new teams would be called the Perth Pelicans and the Perth Sharks. The season increased from 14 games to 15 games per season. Tryouts for the Perth teams began 2 September 2014

== Regular season ==
The regular season began on 5 October 2013 and ran through to 1 March 2014 before the teams competed in the playoff series.

=== October ===
Game	Date	Time	Away	Score	Home	Location	Attendance	Recap
1	5 October 2013	18:30	Sydney Wolf Pack	1 – 2	Sydney Sabres	Canterbury	-	
2	6 October 2013	18:00	Sydney Sabres	3 – 4 (SO)	Sydney Wolf Pack	Canterbury	-	
3	21 October 2013	19:45	Perth Pelicans	4 – 6	Perth Sharks	Mirrabooka	-	
4	26 October 2013	18:15	Melbourne Glaciers	1 – 3	Melbourne Whalers	Melbourne	-	
5	27 October 2013	8:00	Perth Sharks	6 – 5 (SO)	Perth Pelicans	Perth	-	
6	27 October 2013	18:15	Melbourne Whalers	1 – 4	Melbourne Glaciers	Melbourne	-	

=== November ===
Game	Date	Time	Away	Score	Home	Location	Attendance	Recap
7	2 November 2013	19:00	Sydney Wolf Pack	4 – 3	Sydney Sabres	Penrith	-	
8	3 November 2013	17:00	Sydney Sabres	8 – 3	Sydney Wolf Pack	Penrith	-	
9	9 November 2013	17:00	Sydney Sabres	4 – 0	Melbourne Glaciers	Melbourne	-	
10	9 November 2013	19:00	Sydney Wolf Pack	3 – 1	Melbourne Whalers	Melbourne	-	
11	10 November 2013	08:00	Perth Sharks	3 – 2	Perth Pelicans	Perth	-	
12	10 November 2013	13:15	Sydney Sabres	5 – 1	Melbourne Whalers	Melbourne	-	
13	10 November 2013	15:00	Sydney Wolf Pack	0 – 2	Melbourne Glaciers	Melbourne	-	
14	16 November 2013	19:30	Melbourne Glaciers	0 – 3	Melbourne Whalers	Melbourne	-	
15	23 November 2013	17:00	Melbourne Whalers	1 – 4	Melbourne Glaciers	Melbourne	-	
16	24 November 2013	15:45	Melbourne Glaciers	5 – 4	Melbourne Whalers	Melbourne	-	

=== December ===
Game	Date	Time	Away	Score	Home	Location	Attendance	Recap
17	1 December 2013	08:00	Perth Pelicans	2 – 1	Perth Sharks	Perth	-	
18	2 December 2013	19:45	Perth Sharks	2 – 8	Perth Pelicans	Mirrabooka	-	
19	7 December 2013	16:30	Melbourne Whalers	5 – 1	Perth Sharks	Mirrabooka	-	
20	7 December 2013	18:15	Melbourne Glaciers	2 – 1 (SO)	Perth Pelicans	Mirrabooka	-	
21	7 December 2013	19:30	Sydney Sabres	5 – 4	Sydney Wolf Pack	Penrith	-	
22	8 December 2013	17:15	Melbourne Whalers	5 – 2	Perth Pelicans	Perth	-	
23	8 December 2013	08:55	Melbourne Glaciers	1 – 2	Perth Sharks	Perth	-	
24	8 December 2013	17:00	Sydney Wolf Pack	2 – 3 (SO)	Sydney Sabres	Penrith	-	
25	14 December 2013	17:00	Perth Pelicans	2 – 9	Sydney Sabres	Penrith	-	
26	14 December 2013	19:30	Perth Sharks	1 – 5	Melbourne Whalers	Melbourne	-	
27	15 December 2013	08:00	Perth Pelicans	1 – 5	Sydney Wolf Pack	Penrith	-	
28	15 December 2013	15:45	Perth Sharks	3 – 4	Melbourne Glaciers	Melbourne	-	

=== February ===
Game	Date	Time	Away	Score	Home	Location	Attendance	Recap
29	1 February 2014	16:30	Sydney Wolf Pack	2 – 8	Perth Pelicans	Mirrabooka	-	
30	1 February 2014	18:15	Sydney Sabres	6 – 2	Perth Sharks	Mirrabooka	-	
31	2 February 2014	07:15	Sydney Wolf Pack	5 – 2	Perth Sharks	Perth	-	
32	2 February 2014	08:55	Sydney Sabres	5 – 1	Perth Pelicans	Perth	-	
33	8 February 2014	17:00	Melbourne Glaciers	1 – 2	Sydney Wolf Pack	Penrith	-	
34	8 February 2014	18:45	Melbourne Whalers	0 – 2	Sydney Sabres	Penrith	-	
35	8 February 2014	17:45	Perth Sharks	2 – 4	Perth Pelicans	Mirrabooka	-	
36	9 February 2014	08:30	Melbourne Glaciers	4 – 2	Sydney Sabres	Penrith	-	
37	9 February 2014	17:00	Melbourne Whalers	2 – 1	Sydney Wolf Pack	Penrith	-	
38	9 February 2014	17:45	Perth Pelicans	4 – 2	Perth Sharks	Mirrabooka	-	
39	15 February 2014	18:15	Melbourne Whalers	3 – 1	Melbourne Glaciers	Melbourne	-	
40	15 February 2014	17:45	Perth Pelicans	7 – 2	Perth Sharks	Mirrabooka	-	
41	15 February 2014	18:15	Melbourne Glaciers	0 – 2	Melbourne Whalers	Melbourne	-	
42	22 February 2014	17:00	Sydney Sabres	4 – 7	Sydney Wolf Pack	Penrith	-	
43	22 February 2014	17:00	Melbourne Glaciers	3 – 5	Melbourne Whalers	Melbourne	-	
44	22 February 2014	17:30	Perth Sharks	4 – 7	Perth Pelicans	Mirrabooka	-	

=== March ===
Game	Date	Time	Away	Score	Home	Location	Attendance	Recap
45	1 March 2014	17:00	Sydney Wolf Pack	2 – 4	Sydney Sabres	Penrith	-	

== Standings ==
At the end of the regular season, the league standings were as follows:

Team	GP	W	OTW	OTL	L	GF	GA	GDF	PTS
Sydney Sabres	15	10	0	0	3	65	37	+28	33
Melbourne Whalers	15	9	0	0	6	41	33	+11	27
Perth Pelicans	15	7	0	0	6	58	56	-2	23
Sydney Wolf Pack	15	6	0	0	7	45	49	–4	21
Melbourne Glaciers	15	6	0	0	8	32	36	-4	20
Perth Sharks	15	3	0	0	11	39	69	–30	11

== Player statistics ==
=== Scoring leaders ===
The following players led the league in regular season points.

Player	Team	GP	G	A	Pts	+/–	PIM
(Australia) Casey Kubara	Sydney Sabres	15	27	17	44	+38	4
(Australia) Todd Cameron	Sydney Sabres	11	11	22	33	+29	18
(Australia) Austin McKenzie	Melbourne Whalers	15	17	6	23	+13	4
(Australia) Kieren Webster	Perth Pelicans	15	9	11	20	+17	4
(Australia) Hayden Sheard	Sydney Sabres	15	14	5	19	+15	16
(Australia) Alec Stephenson	Sydney Wolf Pack	15	8	9	17	+12	26
(Australia) Zane Cunliff	Perth Pelicans	15	10	5	15	+13	18
(Australia) Sam Hodic	Melbourne Glaciers	15	10	6	16	+13	8
(Australia) Shaun Tobin	Perth Sharks	15	10	6	16	+13	4
(Australia) Liam Hall	Perth Pelicans	11	9	6	15	+14	4

== Playoffs ==
=== Final ===
9 March 2014; 15:45	Sydney Sabres	4 – 3 (0-2, 3-0, 1-1)	Melbourne Whalers	Medibank Icehouse

Game reference
Rhett Kelly	Goalies	Mackenzie Hill	Referee: Stephen DeWitt; Linesmen: Tim Bell; Casper Russelhuber
4 / Goals / 3			Referee: Stephen DeWitt; Linesmen: Tim Bell; Casper Russelhuber
22 min	Penalties	14 min	Referee: Stephen DeWitt; Linesmen: Tim Bell; Casper Russelhuber
26	Shots	20	Referee: Stephen DeWitt; Linesmen: Tim Bell; Casper Russelhuber
