= Melbourne Glaciers =

Ice hockey team in Australia

- City: Melbourne, Victoria, Australia
- League: Australian Junior Ice Hockey League
- Founded: 18 September 2012
- Home arena: O'Brien Group Arena
- Colours: (2012–13) (2013-present)
- Owner(s): Victorian Ice Hockey Association
- General manager: (Australia) Sean McConville
- Head coach: (Australia) Michael Flaherty
- Captain: (Australia)

Franchise history
- 2012–2013: Melbourne Red Wings
- 2013-present: Melbourne Glaciers

Championships
- Regular season titles: 2 (2013), (2016)
- AJIHL Championships: 1 (2018)

The Melbourne Glaciers are an Australian junior ice hockey team based in Melbourne, Victoria playing in the Australian Junior Ice Hockey League. They represent one of the two junior ice hockey teams from Victoria currently playing in the AJIHL, which is the most elite level for ice hockey at a national level for ages between 16 and 20 years old.

== History ==
=== AJIHL ===
The Melbourne Red Wings were founded 18 September 2012 following the announcement by Ice Hockey Australia of the formation of the Australian Junior Ice Hockey League. The team is controlled by the Victorian Ice Hockey Association. On 14 October 2012 it was announced that Warren Porter had signed on as coach for the 2012–13 AJIHL season with Michael Flaherty as his assistant.

The first team in club history:

For the 2012–13 AJIHL season

| # | Nat | Name | Pos | Date of birth | Acquired |
|---|---|---|---|---|---|
| 10 | (Australia) | Dylan Black | F | 11 January 1992 | 2012 |
| 3 | (Australia) | Peter Colosimo | D | 28 March 1996 | 2012 |
| 4 | (Australia) | Chris Fahy | D | 27 January 1993 | 2012 |
| 5 | (Australia) | Nikolaos French | F | 26 September 1996 | 2012 |
| 15 | (Australia) | Liam Hayes | D | 30 November 1995 | 2012 |
| 8 | (Australia) | Daniel Hotriem | F | 26 April 1993 | 2012 |
| 6 | (Australia) | Brendan Knox | F | 29 July 1993 | 2012 |
| 7 | (Australia) | Brendan McDowell | F | 12 March 1992 | 2012 |
| 20 | (Australia) | James McKendrick | G | 28 April 1993 | 2012 |
| 19 | (Australia) | Damian Pandolfo | D | 10 March 1995 | 2012 |
| 14 | (Australia) | Kurt Payne | F | 13 September 1994 | 2012 |
| 18 | (Australia) | Thomas Roberts | D | 1 April 1993 | 2012 |
| 11 | (Australia) | Matt Stringer | F | 4 May 1993 | 2012 |
| 9 | (Australia) | Julius Vitikka | F | 28 June 1992 | 2012 |
| 2 | (Australia) | Daniel Williams | D | 30 June 1992 | 2012 |

=== AJIHL Expansion ===
The follow-up season in the Australian Junior Ice Hockey League saw a lot of change via expansion and renaming of its existing teams. The Melbourne Red Wings were renamed the Melbourne Glaciers on 22 August 2013. The changes were made in response to the National Hockey Leagues concern about the AJIHL using their team names and logos but also recognised the opportunity to create a new history for the teams through creating their own identity.

In October 2013 the league expanded to six teams with two teams from Perth, the Sharks and the Pelicans, joining for the start of the 2013–14 season.

== Logo and Uniform ==
=== 2012-2013 Melbourne Red Wings ===
In their first year, and the inaugural AJIHL season, the Melbourne Red Wings wore a uniform that resembled the NHL namesake Detroit Red Wings. The jersey design and uniform bore close resemblance to the Detroit Red Wings design, with the AJIHL logo used for shoulder crests.

=== 2013-present ===
On 22 August 2013 it was announced that the Melbourne Red Wings would change their name to the Melbourne Glaciers, which avoided the close resemblance with the Detroit Red Wings of the NHL after the NHL had made complaint about a breach of copyright and it also allowed the team to develop its own brand identity.

The renaming to Melbourne Glaciers was carefully chosen to reflect Australia's rich hockey culture. The name Glaciers is a tribute to the Melbourne Glaciarium, which was the first place that an ice hockey game was played in Australia on Tuesday 17 July 1906. The Melbourne Glaciarium was also home to one of the original 4 ice hockey teams in Australia called the Glaciarium, who were founded as part of the formation of the Victorian Ice Hockey Association (VIHA) in 1908.

On 13 September 2013, the new Melbourne Glaciers logo design and branding was created by Ross Carpenter and his son, Jack Carpenter, who was largely involved in the creation of the uniform design.

The suggestion to use Glaciers as a new name for the Melbourne Red Wings was made by Michael Flaherty and the reasoning behind it was to honor the Melbourne Glaciarium, the location of the first game of ice hockey game played in Australia. The league made the decision to continue using a predominantly red jersey and provided a limit of 4 colors. The decision to use red as a base colour is thought to honor their patron of the time, Basil Hansen, who first played for the VIHA Red Arrows in 1947. The colors used were charcoal grey, a blue-grey and white to create a palette with glacial coloring.

Melbourne Glaciers logo as of 13 September 2013. Designed by Ross and Jack Carpenter.

The team logo is a stylised representation of a deeply crevassed glacier, grinding its way down around snow-capped peaks, while the half-round (Diocletion) window of Melbourne Glaciarium and a speeding puck symbolize the birthplace of the Australian game.

— Ross Carpenter

The Glaciers nameplate design sprang from that kind of gothic blackletter script that somehow looks at home with icy peaks, pick axes and frozen rivers. This first rink at the main gateway to Melbourne was "the oldest rink in the Empire" by 1939. Although long gone, it was the cradle of national ice sports, and it seems fitting that its spirit can live on here in the red jersey worn by successive generations of Victoria's most promising junior players.

— Ross Carpenter

The Melbourne Glaciarium was situated on the bank of the Yarra River, facing Melbourne city which is currently referred to as South Gate. When it was built in 1906 it was the third largest ice arena in the world and seated 2000 patrons, though peak attendance could see up to 5000 patrons in the venue at one time.

== Season-by-season results ==
| Season | GP | W | OTW | OTL | L | GF | GA | PTS | Finish | Playoff |
|---|---|---|---|---|---|---|---|---|---|---|
| 2012–13 | 14 | 8 | 0 | 1 | 5 | 47 | 41 | 25 | 1st | Won semi-final vs. Melbourne Blackhawks, 7–3; Lost finals series vs. Sydney Maple Leafs, 1–2 |

== Players ==
=== Current roster ===
For the 2016–17 AJIHL season

| # | Nat | Name | Pos | Date of birth | Acquired |
|---|---|---|---|---|---|
| 2 | (Australia) | Timothy Breedveld | | 30 October 1996 | 2016 |
| 4 | (Australia) | Corey Stringer | D | 10 August 1997 | 2013 |
| 6 | (Australia) | Tim Vanderwolf | F | 1 May 1998 | 2014 |
| 7 | (Australia) | Harrison Jaunozols | F | 19 September 1997 | 2016 |
| 8 | (Australia) | Edwin Johnstone | F | 3 June 1999 | 2015 |
| 10 | (Australia) | Gavin Birchler | D | 25 October 1998 | 2014 |
| 11 | (Australia) | David Foster | F | 6 February 1997 | 2013 |
| 12 | (Australia) | Fintan Paisley-Gunn | | 9 April 2000 | 2016 |
| 13 | (Australia) | Taras Cheprakov | D | 18 January 1996 | 2016 |
| 14 | (Australia) | Bryan Birchler | D | 6 June 1996 | 2015 |
| 15 | (Australia) | Jacob Haley | D | 13 July 1999 | 2015 |
| 16 | (Australia) | Simeon Lira | | 22 December 2000 | 2016 |
| 18 | (Australia) | Elijah West-Testa | | 22 February 1999 | 2016 |
| 1 | (Australia) | Michael Breedveld | G | 24 December 1999 | 2016 |

=== Captains ===
The first team Captain for the Melbourne Red Wings in the inaugural year for the AJIHL was Brendan McDowell, his Alternate Captains were Matt Stringer and Chris Fahy.

- 2012–13 Brendan McDowell (C), Matt Stringer (A), Chris Fahy (A)
- 2013–14 Mitch Humphries (C), Jack Carpenter (A), Daniel Szalinski (A)
- 2015–16 Caleb Butler (C), Corey Stringer (A), David Foster (A)
- 2016–17 Corey Stringer (C), David Foster (A), Taras Cheprakov (A)

== Head coaches ==
The first Head Coach for the Melbourne Red Wings in the inaugural year for the AJIHL was Warren Porter.

- 2012–13 Warren Porter
- 2013–14 Warren Porter
- 2014–15 Douglas Stevenson
- 2015–16 Douglas Stevenson
- 2016–17 James Galdes
- 2018–19 Michael Flaherty
- 2019–20 Michael Flaherty

== See also ==
- Australian Junior Ice Hockey League
- Sydney Sabres
- Sydney Wolf Pack
- Melbourne Whalers
- Perth Pelicans
- Perth Sharks
- Ice Hockey Australia
- Ice Hockey New South Wales
- Australian Women's Ice Hockey League
- Australian Ice Hockey League
- Jim Brown Trophy
- Goodall Cup
- Joan McKowen Memorial Trophy
