= Melbourne Whalers =

- City: Melbourne, Victoria, Australia
- League: Australian Junior Ice Hockey League
- Founded: 18 September 2012
- Home arena: O'Brien Group Arena
- Colours: (2012-13) (2013-present)
- Owner(s): Victorian Ice Hockey Association
- General manager: (Australia) Adam Hill
- Head coach: (Finland) Michael Flaherty

Franchise history
- 2012–2013: Melbourne Blackhawks
- 2013–present: Melbourne Whalers

Championships
- Regular season titles: 0
- AJIHL Championships: 0

The Melbourne Whalers are an Australian junior ice hockey team based in Melbourne, Victoria playing in the Australian Junior Ice Hockey League. They represent one of the two junior ice hockey teams from Victoria currently playing in the AJIHL, which is the most elite level for ice hockey at a national level for ages between 16–20 years old.

== History ==
=== AJIHL ===
The Melbourne Blackhawks were founded 18 September 2012 following the announcement by Ice Hockey Australia of the formation of the Australian Junior Ice Hockey League. The team is controlled by the Victorian Ice Hockey Association. On 14 October 2012 it was announced that former Australian player Doug Stevenson had signed on as coach for the 2012–13 AJIHL season.

The Melbourne Blackhawks played the first ever AJIHL game against the Sydney Lightning at the Medibank Icehouse on 21 October 2012. The Blackhawks defeated the Lightning by a score of 5-3.

The first goal ever scored in the AJIHL was by Daniel Pataky of the Sydney Lightning. The first team in club history: For the 2012–13 AJIHL season

#	Nat	Name	Pos	Date of birth	Acquired
11	(Australia)	Alistair Bassett	F	29 September 1993	2012
6	(Australia)	Jack Carpenter	D	30 November 1993	2012
3	(Australia)	Timothy Evans	F	28 December 1994	2012
12	(Australia)	Benjamin Grant	F	20 January 1992	2012
17	(Australia)	Cody Hickman	F	27 March 1992	2012
1	(Australia)	Mackenzie Hill	G	12 July 1996	2012
7	(Australia)	Andrew Johns	F	21 November 1995	2012
18	(Australia)	Paul Lazzarotto	F	22 February 1994	2012
8	(Australia)	Austin McKenzie	F	16 March 1993	2012
16	(Australia)	Matthew Oakes	D	3 July 1996	2012
20	(Australia)	Fraser Ohlson	G	12 June 1995	2012
5	(Australia)	Huw Ohlson	D	26 January 1993	2012
4	(Australia)	Daniel Szalinkski	F	10 May 1993	2012
9	(Australia)	Adam Vilbar	F	11 March 1992	2012
19	(Australia)	Christopher Wong	F	22 April 1995	2012
2	(Australia)	Marcus Wong	D	18 April 1993	2012

=== AJIHL expansion ===
The follow-up season in the Australian Junior Ice Hockey League saw a lot of change via expansion and renaming of its existing teams. The Melbourne Blackhawks were renamed the Melbourne Whalers in September 2013. The changes were made in response to the National Hockey Leagues concern about the AJIHL using their team names and logos but also recognised the opportunity to create a new history for the teams through creating their own identity. In October 2013 the league expanded to six teams with two teams from Perth, the Sharks and the Pelicans, joining for the start of the 2013–14 season.

== Logo and uniform ==
=== 2012-2013 Melbourne Black Hawks ===
In their first year, and the inaugural AJIHL season, the Melbourne Blackhawks wore a uniform that resembled the NHL namesake Chicago Blackhawks. The jersey design and uniform bore close resemblance to the Chicago Blackhawks design, with the AJIHL logo used for shoulder crests. On August 22, 2013 it was announced that the Melbourne Blackhawks would change their name to the Melbourne Whalers, which avoided the close resemblance with the Chicago of the NHL after the NHL had made complaint about a breach of copyright and it also allowed the team to develop its own brand identity.

On September 13, 2013, the new Melbourne Whalers logo design and branding was created by Ross Carpenter and his son, Jack Carpenter, who was largely involved in the creation of the uniform design.

The suggestion to use Whalers as a new name for the Melbourne Blachawks was made by Wayne McBride as an honor to the modern day Melbourne Coat of Arms, which has black and blue spouting whale. The Australian Junior Ice Hockey League selected a new colour scheme which was a watery blue and green.

Yet, many of today's fans would be decidedly disinterested in the iconography of canon harpoons and whale boats. Coastal whaling stations may have helped build Melbourne and Australia but we have moved on one hundred and seventy five years from Portland Bay's whaling industry at its height. In fact, we have been an anti-whaling nation since 1979, more at home with whale watching in winter at Portland or along the Great Ocean Road. For that reason, the logo features the common denominator between then and now. It characterizes a breaching sperm whale, one of a kind that was once commonly hunted in local waters.

— Ross Carpenter

Although now protected it is still threatened, and still pretty angry. These are the largest toothed whale up to 20m in length, with the head being one-third, that dive up to 3 km for prey. The four-colour logo was completed by the need for white highlights and red for that all-consuming mouth straight out of Moby Dick. It looked altogether better on green than blue and so that became the dominant colour of the jersey, broken by white and blue accents in the shape of fins and wavy lines.

— Ross Carpenter

The nameplate design is based around the letter "W" and that iconic whale behaviour known as "tail extension" with all the remaining letters rising like a splash. The nameplate is also used in a round badge on the blue cover pants, and its tail extension is repeated each side with a splash in two shades of green. A sperm whale silhouette makes a modern peace symbol on the lower back and helmet to complete the kit.

— Ross Carpenter

== Season-by-season results ==
Season	GP	W	OTW	OTL	L	GF	GA	PTS	Finish	Playoff
2012–13	14	8	0	0	6	44	36	24	2nd	Lost semi-final vs. Melbourne Red Wings, 3–7

== Players ==
=== Current roster ===
For the 2015–16 AJIHL season

#	Nat	Name	Pos	Date of birth	Acquired
2	(Australia)	Nick Norton	D	3 June 1995	2013
3	(Australia)	Harrison McQuade	F	20 July 1999	2015
4	(Australia)	Andrew Johns	D	2 November 1995	2014
6	(Australia)	Adam Bunting	F	14 February 1995	2015
7	(Norway)	Aleksander Anderson	F	22 July 1998	2015
8	(Australia)	Byron Tschuma	F	1 March 1998	2015
9	(Australia)	Robbie Rama	D	31 December 1997	2013
11	(Australia)	Lenny Lee	F	1 September 1995	2015
13	(Australia)	Evan Connard	F	29 January 1999	2015
14	(Australia)	Sam Stewart	F	16 May 1998	2014
16	(Australia)	Marc Bortolotto	F	16 August 1999	2015
17	(Australia)	Damian Pandolfo	D	10 March 1995	2013
18	(Australia)	Harrison Jaunozols	D	19 September 1997	2013
19	(Australia)	Liam McConnell	F	14 August 1998	2015
20	(Australia)	Fraser Ohlson	G	12 June 1995	2013

=== Captains ===
The first team Captain for the Melbourne Blackhawks in the inaugural year for the AJIHL was Marcus Wong, his Alt Captains were Jack Carpenter and Austin McKenzie.

- 2012-13 Marcus Wong (C), Jack Carpenter (A), Austin McKenzie (A)
- 2013-14 Austin McKenzie (C), Christopher Wong (A),
- 2015-16 Harrison Jaunozols (C)

== Head coaches ==
The first Head Coach for the Melbourne Blackhawks in the inaugural year for the AJIHL was Doug Stevenson.

- 2012-13 Doug Stevenson
- 2013-14 Michael Flaherty
- 2014-15 Michael Flaherty

== See also ==
- Australian Junior Ice Hockey League
- Sydney Sabres
- Sydney Wolf Pack
- Melbourne Glaciers
- Perth Pelicans
- Perth Sharks
- Ice Hockey Australia
- Ice Hockey New South Wales
- Australian Women's Ice Hockey League
- Australian Ice Hockey League
- Jim Brown Trophy
- Goodall Cup
- Joan McKowen Memorial Trophy
