= Australia men's national para ice hockey team =

Australia
- Nickname: Ice Roos
- Association: Australian Para Ice Hockey Association
- Manager: Emma Poynton
- Head coach: Gary Farmer
- Assistants: Ben Stadtmiller
- Captain: Jarred Liddicoat
- Home stadium: Icehouse (arena)
- Team colors: Yellow and Green
- Medals: :1

World Para Ice Hockey Championships
- Appearances: 1 (first in 2018)
- Best result: 3rd - Pool C

World Championships (Pool C) medal record
Bronze medal – third place	2018 Finland	Team

The Australian men's national para ice hockey team (also known as the Aussie Ice Roos) is the para ice hockey team representing Australia. The team made its debut at the 2018 World Para Ice Hockey Championships (Pool C) in Finland.

== History ==
In 2017, the Australian Para Ice Hockey Association was formed with sponsorship from the Australian Paralympic Committee (APC) and Ice Sports Australia. The APC received a grant from the International Paralympic Committee’s (IPC) development arm the Agitos Foundation to grow participation opportunities and to purchase equipment (21 Para-ice hockey sledges and sticks, as well as telescoping noses and picks) for the sport in Australia. Para Ice Hockey Qld in Brisbane received 1 sled of the 21 purchased however in parallel it received a substantial grant from the Queensland Government which enabled it to purchase the bulk of equipment needed to establish the sport. Initial games were held in Melbourne, Perth and Brisbane.

During the 2018 and 2019 Canada vs USA Ice Hockey Classic games held at Sydney's Qudos Bank Arena Brisbane's Entertainment Centre, and Sydney's International Convention Centre, Para Ice Hockey Qld's Kelvin Mickelson coordinated exhibition events which included many generous supporters and three para ice hockey demonstration events to an audience of 25,000. The demonstration games featured Winter Paralympians including Michael Milton, Joany Badenhorst, Sam Tait and Tori Pendergast.

=== Competition history ===
In November 2018, Australia debuted internationally at the 2018 World Para Ice Hockey Championships in Pool C competing against Finland and China. Australia suffered two losses; the first to Finland 6–1, followed by China 40–0. They placed third in the Pool C Championships.

Jarred Liddicoat (Captain) scored Australia's first international Para Ice Hockey goal against Finland. and was awarded the overall World Para Ice Hockey World Championships (Pool C) Most Valuable Player.

== Tournament record ==
=== World Para Ice Hockey Championships ===
2018 - Bronze (Pool C)

== Roster ==
=== 2018 World Para Ice Hockey Championships (C-Pool) Roster ===
- Team Members - Darren Belling (QLD), Joe Chivers (Tas), Geoff Cook (QLD), Marty Jackson (Vic) - Alternate Captain, Tao Joos (NSW), Jarred Liddicoat (QLD) - Captain, Ziggy Markovic (Vic), Xavier Player (Vic) - Alternate Captain, Jason Sauer (QLD), Bill Siegloff (Vic) - Management - Andrew McDowell (Chef de Mission), Emma Poynton (manager), Gary Farmer (head coach), Ben Stadtmiller (assistant coach)

== See also ==
- Australia men's national ice hockey team
