= Perth Pelicans =

- City: Perth, Western Australia, Australia
- League: Australian Junior Ice Hockey League
- Founded: 2013
- Home arena: Xtreme Ice Arena
- Colours: (2013-2014) (2014-present)
- Owner: Western Australian Ice Hockey Association
- General manager: (Australia) Julia Pulner
- Head coach: (Australia) Darin Bryce
- Captain: (Australia) Jordan Grover

Franchise history
- 2013–present: Perth Pelicans

Championships
- Regular season titles: 0
- AJIHL Championships: 0

The Perth Pelicans are an Australian junior ice hockey team based in Perth, Western Australia playing in the Australian Junior Ice Hockey League. They represent one of the two junior ice hockey teams from Western Australia currently playing in the AJIHL, which is the most elite level for ice hockey at a national level for ages between 16 and 20 years old.

== History ==
Tryouts for the new Perth Pelicans team began on 2 September 2014 with a mandatory fitness assessment, held on 2 September 2014 at Kingsway Christian College for 8pm, and 2 ice sessions.

The Perth Pelicans played their first Australian Junior Ice Hockey League game on Monday October 21, 2013 against the Perth Sharks. The Pelicans team included national draft player Liam Hall from Queensland.

=== The first team ===
The players from the first game the Perth Pelicans played in their inaugural season in the Australian Junior Ice Hockey League, October 21, 2013.

For the 2013–14 AJIHL season

#	Nat	Name	Pos	Date of birth	Acquired
9	(Australia)	Tom Smail (Captain)	D	-	2013
19	(Australia)	Stephen McCann	G	-	2013
17	(Australia)	David Mahood	D	-	2013
18	(Australia)	Aaron Dumpleton	F	-	2013
5	(Australia)	Ronan Devahasdin	F	-	2013
14	(Australia)	Zane Cunliff	F	-	2013
20	(Australia)	Chris Shade	D	-	2013
1	(Australia)	Rowan Sobey	G	-	2013
13	(Australia)	Blake Georgeff	F	-	2013
12	(Australia)	Kieren Webster	F	-	2013
11	(Australia)	Matt Armstrong	F	-	2013
16	(Australia)	Rhys Dumpleton	F	-	2013
15	(Australia)	Lyndon Lodge	F	-	2013
3	(Australia)	Jordan Grover	D	-	2013
2	(Australia)	Jonathon Spalding	F	-	2013
10	(Australia)	Liam Hall	F	-	2013

== Players ==
=== Current roster ===
For the 2015–16 AJIHL season

#	Nat	Name	Pos	Date of birth	Acquired
2	(Australia)	Jonathan Spalding	F	17 April 1996	2015
3	(Australia)	Jordan Grover	F	16 June 1995	2015
4	(Australia)	Alistair Lambers	F		2015
12	(Australia)	Kieren Webster	F	12 July 1997	2015
15	(Australia)	Lyndon Lodge	F	12 November 1997	2015
17	(Australia)	David Mahood	D	23 September 1996	2015
21	(Australia)	Zac Hickey	D	23 March 1998	2015
22	(Australia)	Stuart Raine	F	12 August 1998	2015
23	(Australia)	Jordan Williams	F	7 March 1997	2015
24	(Australia)	Joshua Santana	F	4 April 1998	2015
25	(Australia)	Brenden Parker	D	25 June 1997	2015
27	(Australia)	Lachlan Dwyer	D	3 February 1999	2015
29	(Australia)	Ben Willcocks	D	20 April 1999	2015
33	(United Kingdom)	Craig Houston	D	26 April 1997	2015
35	(Australia)	Gabe Devereux - Smith	D	10 September 1998	2015
6	(Australia)	Dathan Pleiter	G	22 May 1996	2014
19	(Australia)	Stephen McCann	G	9 July 1997	2015

=== Captains ===
- 2013-14 Tom Smail (C)
- 2014-15 Kieren Webster (C), Rhys Dumpleton (A), Ryan Smith (A)
- 2015-16 Jordan Grover (C), Jordan Williams (A), David Mahood (A)

== Head coaches ==
The first Head Coach for the Perth Pelicans was Darin Bryce.

- 2013-14 Darin Bryce
- 2014-15 Darin Bryce
- 2015-16 Darin Bryce

== See also ==
- Australian Junior Ice Hockey League
- Melbourne Glaciers
- Melbourne Whalers
- Perth Sharks
- Sydney Sabres
- Sydney Wolf Pack
- Ice Hockey Australia
- Ice Hockey New South Wales
- Australian Women's Ice Hockey League
- Australian Ice Hockey League
- Jim Brown Trophy
- Goodall Cup
- Joan McKowen Memorial Trophy
