= Australian Junior Ice Hockey League =

Australian Junior Ice Hockey League (AJIHL)
- Current season, competition or edition: 2019–20 AJIHL season
- Sport: Ice Hockey
- Founded: 18 September 2012
- First season: 2012
- Owner: Ice Hockey Australia
- No. of teams: 6
- Country: Australia
- Most recent champion: Sydney Sabres
- Website: www.iha.org.au/competitions/ajihl-1

The Australian Junior Ice Hockey League (AJIHL) is an elite amateur national ice hockey league in Australia, open to players 20 years of age or younger.

== History ==
The Australian Junior Ice Hockey League was first announced on 18 September 2012 by Ice Hockey Australia. The inaugural season consisted of four teams – Melbourne Blackhawks, Melbourne Red Wings, Sydney Lightning and the Sydney Maple Leafs, with teams being operated by their respective state governing body. The first season started on 20 October 2012 at the Medibank Icehouse in Melbourne and ran until March 2013 with the finals to be held on 9 and 10 March 2013.

The Sydney Maple Leafs won the inaugural AJIHL finals after beating the Melbourne Red Wings in a tie-breaking sudden overtime period after the teams leveled the two game series. The Maple Leafs had defeated the Sydney Lightning the week before in the Sydney semi-final, while the Red Wings won the Melbourne semi-final against the Blackhawks 7–3 to progress into the final.

On 22 August 2013 it was announced that Ice Hockey Victoria were renaming the two Melbourne teams for the 2013–14 season. The Melbourne Blackhawks were renamed as the Melbourne Whalers and the Melbourne Red Wings became the Melbourne Glaciers.

The following month the Sydney Maple Leafs were renamed the Sydney Wolf Pack and the Sydney Lightning changed their name to the Sydney Sabres. The changes were made in response to the National Hockey Leagues concern about the AJIHL using their team names and logos, as well as an opportunity to create new history for the teams.

=== First Expansion ===
In October 2013 the league expanded to six teams with two teams from Perth, the Sharks and the Pelicans, joining for the start of the 2013–14 season. It is expected that the AJIHL will further expand in 2015-16 to include 3 new teams from Adelaide, Brisbane and Canberra.

The Sydney-based teams play their homes games at the Penrith Ice Palace in Penrith, New South Wales, the Melbourne-based teams play out of the O'Brien Group Arena in Docklands, Victoria. and the Perth-based teams play out of the Xtreme Ice Arena in Mirrabooka, Western Australia.

=== Second Expansion ===
At the beginning of the 2015-16 AJIHL season, a proposal for the next expansion in the AJIHL was made by Ice Hockey Australia to include teams from the Australian states of Queensland and South Australia and the Australian Capital Territory. A Wild Card entry was created in the AJIHL playoff structure, but no further public information would be made available for months despite plans to form junior teams in each of these states being underway.

On the 21 January 2016 a Tier 2 extension of the AJIHL was announced which would consist of a round robin style tournament and playoff to pick a wild card entry into the AJIHL finals. Currently 3 teams are in the AJIHL Tier 2 league, representing the Australian cities Adelaide, Brisbane and Canberra.

By October 2016 no information about the 2016-17 AJIHL season had been released and it was not until the very end of the month that information began to surface over social media involving a weekend schedule involving only the Sydney-based teams and the new expansion teams from Canberra and Brisbane. It was later revealed that the league would adopt a new state based weekend mini tournament style format with 2 conferences in order to minimise the added expenditure involved in having 3 additional cities joining the League. In the first week of December Canberra Junior Brave withdrew from the scheduled weekend tournament, leaving the remaining 3 teams to only play 4 games instead of the scheduled 6 and the status of the Canberra Junior Brave unknown for the remainder of the season. On 17 December 2016, Brisbane Blitz goaltender Imogen Perry became the first female to play in the Australian Junior Ice Hockey League, facing 38 shots on goal against the Sydney Sabres and winning 7 - 1.

On 6 January 2017, the next schedule was released involving the remaining teams in Melbourne, Perth and Adelaide. Due to a shrinking junior talent pool, the Melbourne Whalers suspended operations for the 2016-17 AJIHL season and only the Melbourne Glaciers would compete. No ice time was reserved to schedule AJIHL games in Melbourne. The Perth Pelicans also suspended operation for the 2016-17 AJIHL season, leaving only the Perth Sharks to compete.

== Teams ==
There are currently 6 teams in the AJIHL, representing the Australian cities Perth, Melbourne and Sydney and Brisbane.

Teams currently in the AJIHL.

| Team | City/Area | Arena | Coordinates | Founded | Joined | Former Name |
Australian Junior Ice Hockey League
| Adelaide Generals | Adelaide, SA | Ice Arena (Adelaide) | 34.919653°S 138.578596°E | 2016 | | |
| Brisbane Blitz | Brisbane, QLD | Ice World Acacia Ridge | 27.340352°S 153.05831°E | 2016 | | |
| Melbourne Glaciers | Melbourne, VIC | O'Brien Group Arena | 37.8124°S 144.9356°E | 2012 | | Melbourne Red Wings (2012-2013) |
| Perth Sharks | Perth, WA | Xtreme Ice Arena | 31.868182°S 115.855733°E | 2013 | | |
| Sydney Sabres | Sydney, NSW | Penrith Ice Palace | 33.768832°S 150.672969°E | 2012 | | Sydney Lightning (2012-2013) |
| Sydney Wolf Pack | Sydney, NSW | Penrith Ice Palace | 33.768832°S 150.672969°E | 2012 | | Sydney Maple Leafs (2012-2013) |

There are currently 3 AJIHL teams that will be inactive since the 2016-17 AJIHL season.

Teams Innactive in the AJIHL.

| Team | City/Area | Arena | Coordinates | Founded | Joined | Former Name |
Inactive Teams
| Canberra Junior Brave | Canberra, ACT | Phillip Ice Skating Centre | 31.868182°S 115.855733°E | 2015 | 2016 | | |
| Melbourne Whalers | Melbourne, VIC | O'Brien Group Arena | 37.8124°S 144.9356°E | 2012 | | Melbourne Blackhawks (2012-2013) |
| Perth Pelicans | Perth, WA | Xtreme Ice Arena | 31.868182°S 115.855733°E | 2013 | | |

== Champions ==
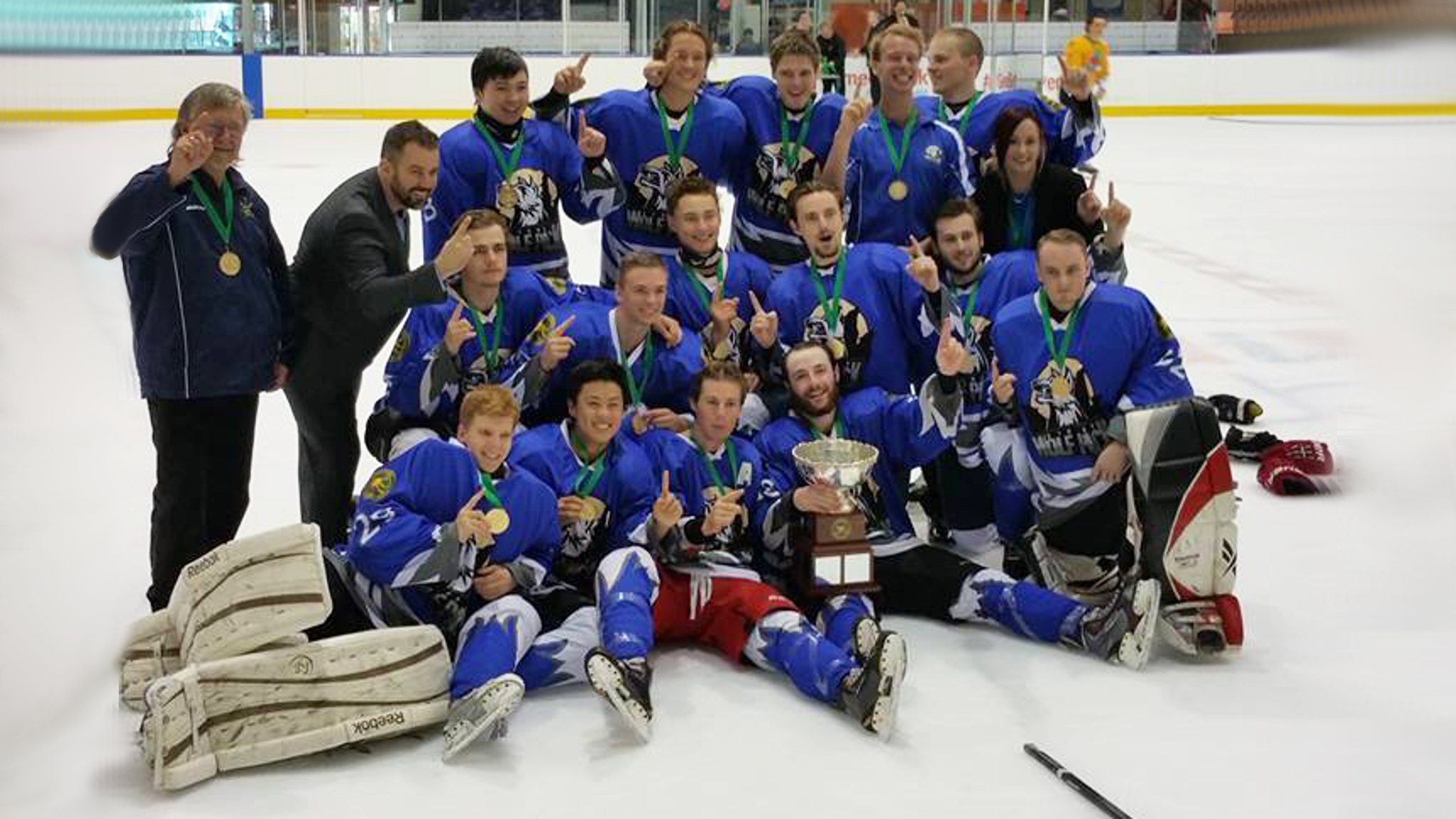
Sydney Wolf Pack AJIHL Championship Team March 1, 2015.

- 2013 Sydney Maple Leafs
- 2014 Sydney Sabres
- 2015 Sydney Wolf Pack
- 2016 Sydney Sabres
- 2017 Adelaide Generals
- 2018 Melbourne Glaciers
- 2019 Sydney Sabres

== See also ==
- Ice Hockey Australia
- Australian Women's Ice Hockey League
- Australian Ice Hockey League
- Jim Brown Shield
- Goodall Cup
- Joan McKowen Memorial Trophy
