= 2014–15 AJIHL season =

- League: Australian Junior Ice Hockey League
- Sport: Ice hockey
- Duration: 4 October 2014 – 1 March 2015
- Number of games: 15
- Number of teams: 6

Regular season
- Premiers: Perth Sharks
- Top scorer: Tomek Sak

AJIHL Champions Trophy
- Champions: Sydney Wolf Pack
- Runners-up: Perth Pelicans

AJIHL seasons
- ← 2013–14 2015–16 →

The 2014–15 AJIHL season is the third season of the Australian Junior Ice Hockey League. It ran from 4 October 2014 until 21 February 2015, with the finals running from 28 February 2015 until 1 March 2015. The AJIHL is the highest Australian national junior ice hockey competition.

== League business ==
The regular season began on 4 October 2014 and ran through to 21 February 2015 before the teams competed in the playoff series.

The Perth Pelicans and Perth Sharks had a game cancelled, 15 November 2014 which was never rescheduled meaning both teams finished the season a game short of the other teams.

== Regular season ==
The regular season began on 4 October 2014 and ran through to 21 February 2015 before the teams competed in the playoff series.

=== October ===
Game	Date	Time	Away	Score	Home	Location	Attendance	Recap
1	4 October 2014	17:00	Sydney Sabres	2 – 4	Sydney Wolf Pack	Penrith	-	
2	5 October 2014	17:00	Sydney Wolf Pack	3 – 2 (SO)	Sydney Sabres	Penrith	-	
3	10 October 2014	20:00	Melbourne Glaciers	5 – 2	Melbourne Whalers	Melbourne	-	
4	11 October 2014	17:30	Perth Pelicans	2 – 3	Perth Sharks	Mirrabooka	-	
5	13 October 2014	19:45	Perth Sharks	6 – 2	Perth Pelicans	Mirrabooka	-	
6	18 October 2014	19:30	Perth Pelicans	5 – 0	Melbourne Whalers	Melbourne	-	
7	19 October 2014	15:45	Perth Pelicans	3 – 2	Melbourne Glaciers	Melbourne	-	
8	25 October 2014	19:00	Sydney Wolf Pack	1 – 4	Sydney Sabres	Penrith	-	

=== November ===
Game	Date	Time	Away	Score	Home	Location	Attendance	Recap
9	1 November 2014	19:00	Sydney Sabres	1 – 0	Sydney Wolf Pack	Penrith	-	
10	1 November 2014	17:00	Melbourne Whalers	3 – 2 (SO)	Melbourne Glaciers	Melbourne	-	
11	2 November 2014	17:00	Sydney Wolf Pack	0 – 4	Sydney Sabres	Penrith	-	
12	2 November 2014	17:00	Melbourne Glaciers	1 – 0	Melbourne Whalers	Melbourne	-	
13	8 November 2014	17:00	Sydney Wolf Pack	2 – 1	Melbourne Whalers	Melbourne	-	
14	8 November 2014	19:00	Sydney Sabres	0 – 2	Melbourne Glaciers	Melbourne	-	
15	8 November 2014	18:430	Perth Sharks	5 – 6 (SO)	Perth Pelicans	Mirrabooka	-	
16	9 November 2014	13:15	Sydney Sabres	3 – 1	Melbourne Whalers	Melbourne	-	
17	9 November 2014	15:00	Sydney Wolf Pack	3 – 2 (SO)	Melbourne Glaciers	Melbourne	-	
18	15 November 2014	19:00	Sydney Sabres	2 – 1	Sydney Wolf Pack	Penrith	-	
19	15 November 2014	18:30	Perth Pelicans	Cancelled	Perth Sharks	Cancelled	-	N/A
20	16 November 2014	17:00	Sydney Wolf Pack	0 – 2	Sydney Sabres	Penrith	-	
21	22 November 2014	19:00	Perth Sharks	4 – 3	Sydney Wolf Pack	Penrith	-	
22	23 November 2014	17:00	Perth Sharks	2 – 1 (SO)	Sydney Sabres	Penrith	-	
23	29 November 2014	17:00	Melbourne Glaciers	5 – 3	Melbourne Whalers	Melbourne	-	
24	30 November 2014	17:00	Melbourne Whalers	1 – 4	Melbourne Glaciers	Melbourne	-	

=== January ===
Game	Date	Time	Away	Score	Home	Location	Attendance	Recap
25	24 January 2015	18:30	Perth Pelicans	3 – 5	Perth Sharks	Mirrabooka	-	
26	25 January 2015	18:30	Perth Sharks	4 – 1	Perth Pelicans	Perth	-	
27	31 January 2015	16:30	Sydney Sabres	3 – 6	Perth Sharks	Mirrabooka	-	
28	31 January 2015	18:15	Sydney Wolf Pack	1 – 2	Perth Pelicans	Mirrabooka	-	
29	31 January 2015	19:00	Melbourne Glaciers	2 – 1	Melbourne Whalers	Melbourne	-	

=== February ===
Game	Date	Time	Away	Score	Home	Location	Attendance	Recap
30	1 February 2015	7:15	Sydney Sabres	2 -1	Perth Pelicans	Perth	-	
31	1 February 2015	8:55	Sydney Wolf Pack	4 – 3	Perth Sharks	Perth	-	
32	1 February 2015	17:00	Melbourne Whalers	4 – 3 (SO)	Melbourne Glaciers	Melbourne	-	
33	7 February 2015	17:00	Melbourne Whalers	3 – 5	Perth Sharks	Penrith	-	
34	7 February 2015	18:45	Melbourne Glaciers	0 – 2	Sydney Wolf Pack	Penrith	-	
35	7 February 2015	18:30	Perth Pelicans	4 - 3 (SO)	Mirrabooka	Perth	-	
36	8 February 2015	8:30	Melbourne Whalers	5 – 3	Sydney Wolf Pack	Penrith	-	
37	8 February 2015	17:00	Melbourne Glaciers	3 – 4	Sydney Sabres	Penrith	-	
38	8 February 2015	18:30	Perth Sharks	4 – 1	Perth Pelicans	Perth	-	
39	14 February 2015	16:30	Melbourne Whalers	0 – 7	Perth Pelicans	Mirrabooka	-	
40	14 February 2015	18:15	Melbourne Glaciers	4 – 5	Perth Sharks	Mirrabooka	-	
41	15 February 2015	17:00	Sydney Wolf Pack	3 – 0	Sydney Sabres	Penrith	-	
42	15 February 2015	19:00	Melbourne Whalers	3 – 8	Perth Sharks	Melbourne	-	
43	15 February 2015	8:45	Melbourne Glaciers	5 – 4	Perth Pelicans	Penrith	-	
44	21 February 2015	17:15	Perth Pelicans	6 – 4	Perth Sharks	Penrith	-	
45	21 February 2015	17:00	Melbourne Whalers	2 – 5	Melbourne Glaciers	Penrith	-	

== Standings ==
At the end of the regular season, the league standings were as follows:

Team	GP	W	OTW	OTL	L	GF	GA	GDF	PTS
Perth Sharks	14	9	0	0	2	62	43	+19	31
Sydney Sabres	15	9	0	0	4	35	30	+5	29
Melbourne Glaciers	15	8	0	0	4	45	37	+8	27
Perth Pelicans	14	5	0	0	7	47	44	+3	19
Sydney Wolf Pack	15	4	0	0	8	30	34	–4	19
Melbourne Whalers	15	1	0	0	12	29	60	–31	7

== Playoffs ==
=== Final ===
1 March 2015; 15:45	Perth Pelicans	6 – 7 (SO) (2-2, 1-2, 3-2, 0-1)	Sydney Wolf Pack	Medibank Icehouse

Game reference
Stephen McCann	Goalies	Jake Burgess	Referee: Jeff Klinck; Linesmen: Casper Russelhuber; Tom Roberts
6 / Goals / 7			Referee: Jeff Klinck; Linesmen: Casper Russelhuber; Tom Roberts
10 min	Penalties	4 min	Referee: Jeff Klinck; Linesmen: Casper Russelhuber; Tom Roberts
41	Shots	27	Referee: Jeff Klinck; Linesmen: Casper Russelhuber; Tom Roberts
