= Penrith Ice Palace =

Former ice rink in New South Wales, Australia

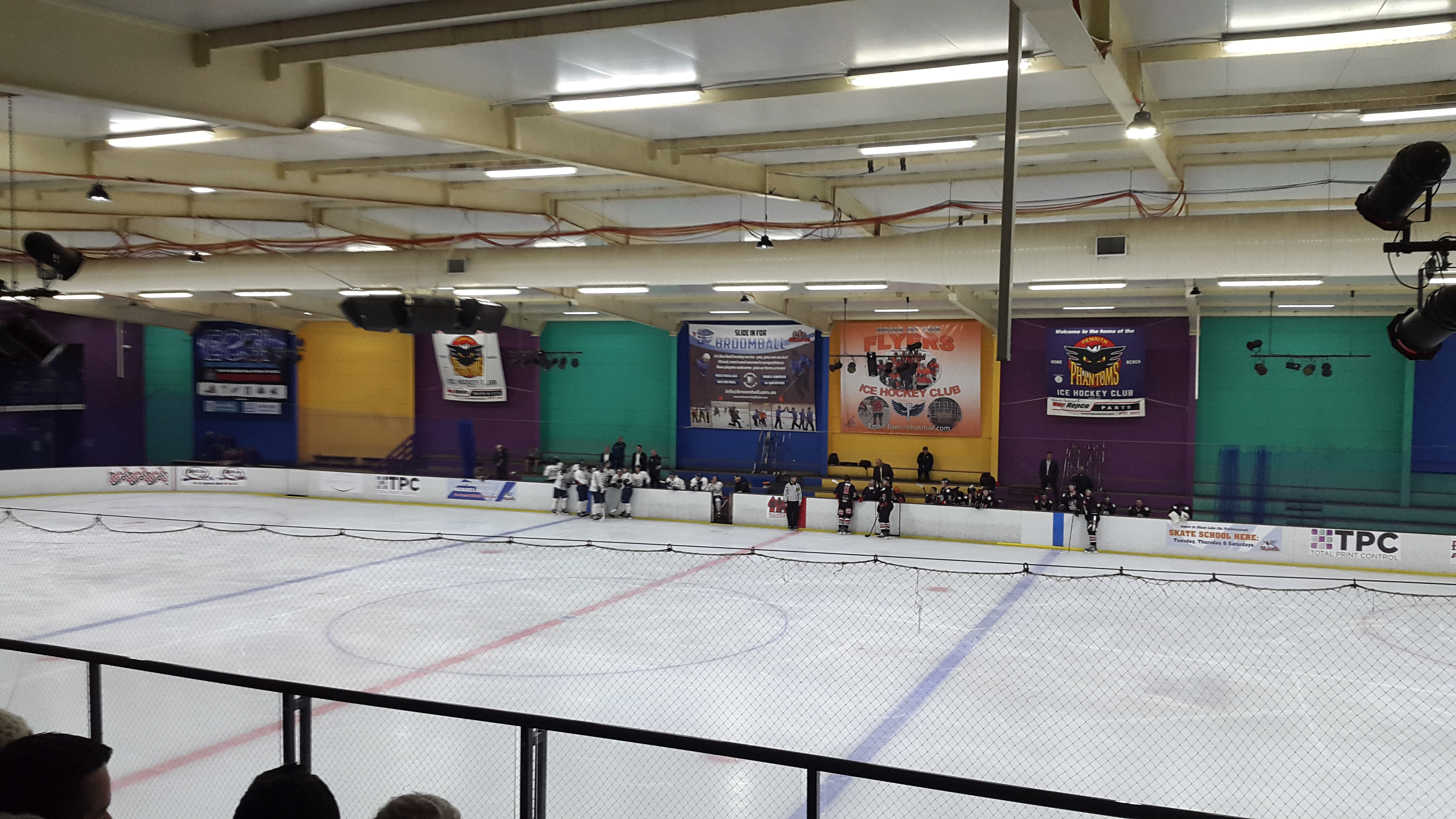
- Interactive map of Penrith Ice Palace
- Location: 7-10 Pattys Place, Jamisontown, NSW, 2750
- Coordinates: 33°46′08″S 150°40′23″E
- Capacity: 1500 (seating)
- Surface: 60 metres × 30 metres

Construction
- Opened: 2000 (26 years ago)

Tenants
- Valley Figure Skating Club (Present); Sydney Sabres (2012 – present); Sydney Wolf Pack (2012 – present); Sydney Bears (2007-11, 2015-16)

Website
- Penrith Ice Palace

The Penrith Ice Palace (also known as Penrith Ice Rink.) was an ice sports and public skate centre, located west of Sydney in Penrith, New South Wales, Australia. It permanently closed on Wednesday 29 June 2022. It served as the home ice rink of the Penrith Valley Figure Skating Club, AJIHL teams Sydney Sabres (formally Sydney Lightning) and Sydney Wolf Pack (formally Sydney Maple Leafs), and the home of Broomball in NSW. It twice was the home venue of the Australian Ice Hockey League (AIHL) team Sydney Bears between 2007–11 and 2015-16.

== Facilities ==
Facilities at Penrith Ice Palace are detailed below:

- 60 m × 30 m ice rink (Olympic sized)
- 1,500 seating capacity for spectators (raised above the ground level)
- Skate hire
- Canteen
- Proshop
- Onsite parking
- Street parking

The inside temperature is 10 °C to 15 °C and the ice temperature is kept at -5 °C to -9 °C.

== Events ==
Penrith Ice Palace offers regular events including public ice skating sessions, children's party packages, Friday night disco sessions, learn to skate school, ice hockey development, figure skating, ice hockey and broomball.

Since 2012, the Ice Palace has hosted regular Australian Junior Ice Hockey League matches between the months of November to March.

== See also ==
- List of ice rinks in Australia
- Sport in New South Wales
