= New South Wales Ice Hockey Association =

- Sport: Ice hockey
- Jurisdiction: New South Wales
- Founded: 1921
- Affiliation: Ice Hockey Australia
- President: Tim Kitching
- Secretary: Derek Downie

Official website
- ihnsw.com.au
- (Australia)
- (New South Wales)

The New South Wales Ice Hockey Association, currently trading as Ice Hockey NSW is the governing body of ice hockey in New South Wales, Australia. The New South Wales Ice Hockey Association is a branch of Ice Hockey Australia.

== History ==
=== 1911: Club hockey begins in New South Wales ===
The beginnings of club hockey in New South Wales occurred at the Sydney Glaciarium in 1911 and consisted of 3 original ice hockey clubs.

- Corinthians
- Ottawas
- Wanderers

=== 1922: New South Wales Ice Hockey Association ===
From the Sydney Ice Hockey Club, the New South Wales Ice Hockey Association was formed, considered the first proper governing body in New South Wales for ice hockey. The original Sydney Ice Hockey Club decided to split up into 4 different teams under an association, the teams were:

- North Sydney
- South Sydney
- Eastern Suburbs
- Western Suburbs

The intention was to hold competitions during the ice skating season and pick a New South Wales state representative team to play against Victoria for the Interstate Ice Hockey Series. The first match organised was a combined match where the North Sydney and South Sydney team would combine to play against the Eastern Suburbs and Western Suburbs combination team.

== National Competition ==
=== 1909: The Goodall Cup ===
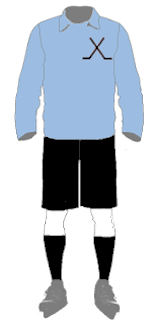
The first ice hockey uniform for New South Wales 1909

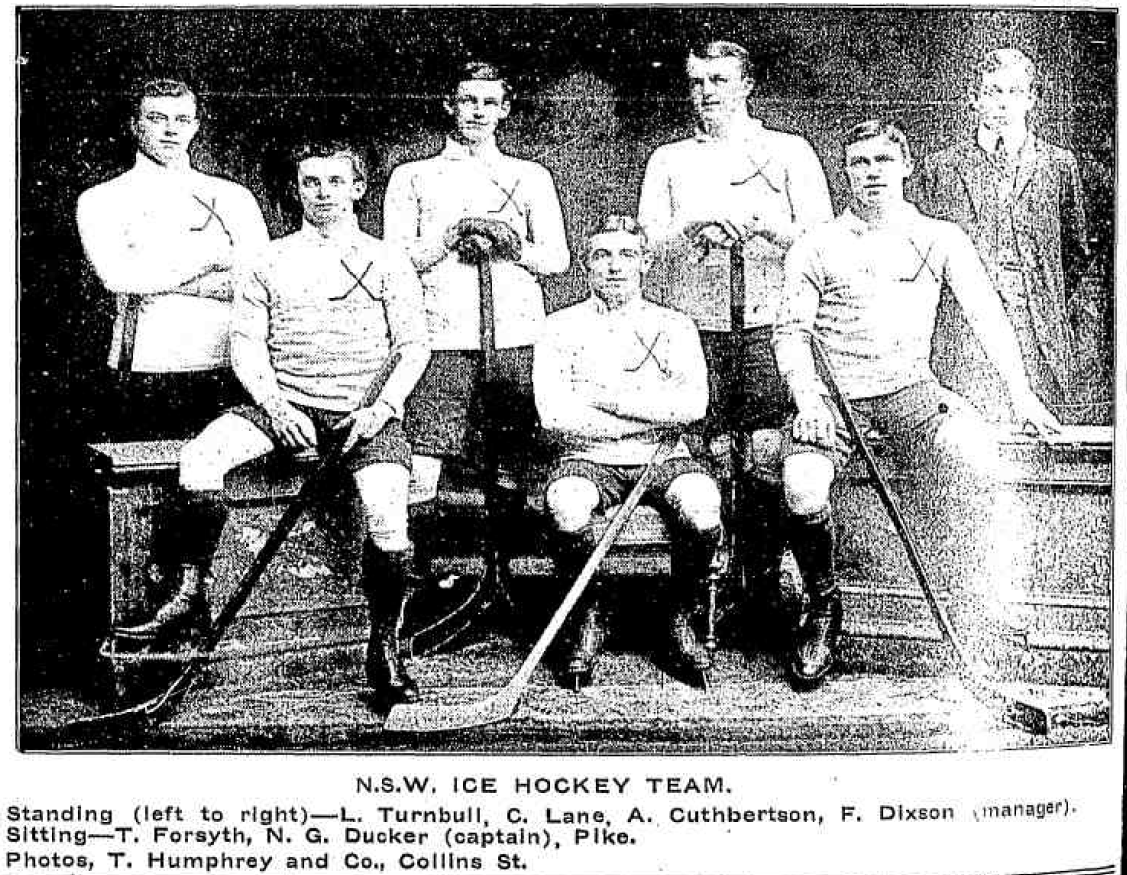
The first ice hockey team representing New South Wales 1909

The first inter-state ice hockey championship was held between a state representative team from Victoria and from New South Wales. This tournament was a best-of-3 format and saw Victoria win the series 2 games to 1. New South Wales was represented by a newly formed team in 1909 and traveled to Melbourne on 29 August 1909 which marked the first national interstate competition for senior men's hockey in Australia. This was the year that 16-year-old John Edwin Goodall donated the J. E. Goodall Cup to the interstate series, the Victoria state team won the inaugural tournament to become the first Goodall Cup Champions, with Robert Jackson as the captain, who scored 3 goals in the second half of the final game.

The first game of the series had a final score of 2-1 with New South Wales defeating Victoria. Friday 3 September 1909 the Victorian team defeated the New South Wales team 1-0, giving Victorian goaltender Charles Watt the first recorded shutout in Goodall Cup history. In the third game of the series both teams had won a game each. Victoria defeated New South Wales 6-1 and became the first team to win the interstate championship in Australia and the first to be awarded the Goodall Cup.

Before World War I, which interrupted the Goodall Cup series in 1914, New South Wales won 2 out of 5 Goodall Cup championships held between 1909 and 1913. Jim Kendall dominated the Victorians in his first 2 years with New South Wales, helping them win 2 Goodall Cups back to back.

When the Goodall Cup tournament resumed in 1921, New South Wales would win but Victoria would win the following year in 1922, captained by John Edwin Goodall. This was Victoria's last Goodall Cup win until 1947 where New South Wales would dominate the Goodall Cup inter-state tournaments.

In 1952 the tournament expanded with the introduction of a team from Tasmania. The first time Tasmania competed in the inter-state tournament was 1 July 1952 against Victoria at the Hobart Glaciarium. Victoria would go on to win the Goodall Cup that year.

The Goodall Cup continued to be awarded to the winners of the inter-state ice hockey champions until 2001. In 2002 the Goodall Cup was used as an award to the playoff champions in the Australian Ice Hockey League, which is the most elite national ice hockey league in Australia. For its centenary, the Goodall Cup was used again as an award for an inter-state ice hockey competition but was returned to be used the AIHL immediately after.

=== 1922: The Gower Cup ===
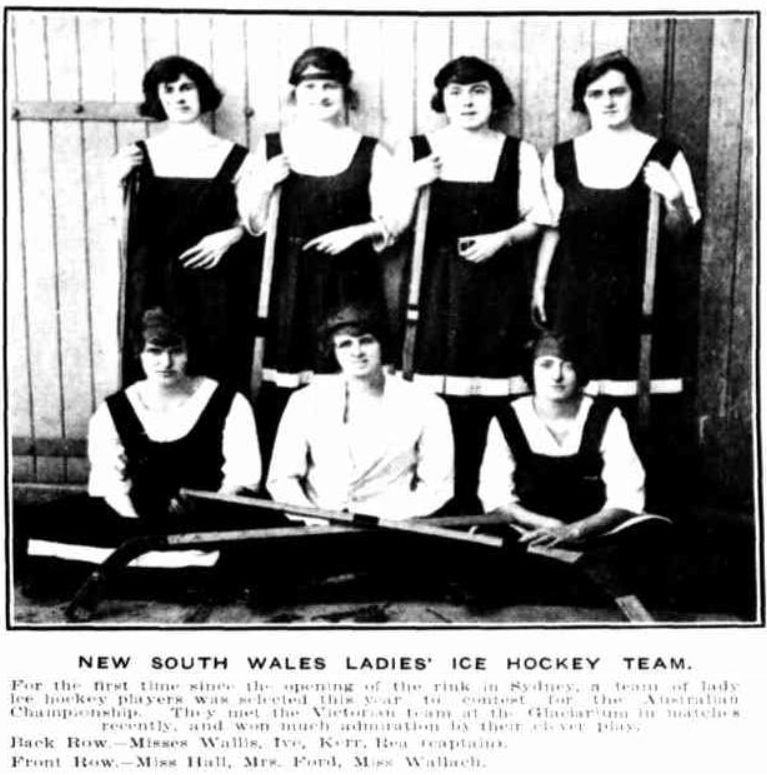
The first women's ice hockey team representing New South Wales 1922

The first inter-state women's ice hockey championship tournament was held in the first week in August 1922 between New South Wales and Victoria, New South Wales won the first game of the series 3-0.

The first Women's ice hockey team representing New South Wales consisted of:

- Miss E. Rea (Captain)
- Miss V. Wallace
- Miss M. Ive
- Miss N. Kerr
- Miss J. Hall
- Miss E. Wallach
- Mrs. B. W. Ford (Goaltender)

== Background ==
The New South Wales Ice Hockey Association (NSWIHA) was formed as the New South Wales state branch for Ice Hockey Australia. It is responsible for organising the nine state leagues across six different age groups during the normal season as well as a summer hockey league for senior players. It is also responsible for selecting the state teams to compete in the national tournaments.

NSWIHA operates its leagues out of five venues – Macquarie Ice Rink, Sydney Ice Arena, Canterbury Olympic Ice Rink, Liverpool Catholic Club Ice Rink and the Penrith Ice Palace. Teams are fielded in the leagues by eight clubs – the Blacktown Flyers, Canberra Phoenix, Canterbury Eagles, East Coast Super League, Liverpool Saints, Newcastle Northstars, Norwest Emperors, Penrith Phantoms, and the Sydney Bears. The associations current president is Steve Ransome.

== Leagues ==
- Senior 1 – the top senior league in New South Wales.
- Senior 2 – the second tier senior league.
- Senior 3 – the third tier senior league.
- Women – the women's senior league.
- East Coast Super League – junior league for 23 and under with special inclusion of five players per team of over 23. The league operates as a separate incorporated association.
- Midget – junior league open to players 18 and under for both boys and girls.
- Bantam – junior league open to players 15 and under for both boys and girls.
- Pee Wee – junior league open to players 13 and under for both boys and girls.
- Atom – junior league open to players 11 and under for both boys and girls.
- Summer B – senior league which is run during the summer off-season.

== Presidents ==
- 1924 – Dunbar Poole
- 1926 – Dunbar Poole
- 1929 – Dunbar Poole
- 1931 – Dunbar Poole
- 1933 – Norman P. Joseph
- 1934 – Norman P. Joseph
- 1936 – Harold Waddell Hoban
- 1937 – Harold Waddell Hoban
- 1938 – Harold Waddell Hoban
- 1939 – Harold Waddell Hoban
- 1941 – Harold Waddell Hoban
- 1953 – Ken Kennedy
- 2006 – Tim McMahon
- 2007 – Tim McMahon
- 2008 – Tim McMahon
- 2009 – Tim McMahon
- 2010 – Tim McMahon
- 2013 – Steve Ransome
- 2014 – Steve Ransome
- 2015 -
- 2016 -
- 2017 -
- 2018 -
- 2019 -
- 2020 -
- 2021 -
- 2022 - Tim Kitching
- 2023 - Tim Kitching

== See also ==
- Ice Hockey Australia
- Australian Women's Ice Hockey League
- Australian Junior Ice Hockey League
