= Ice Hockey Australia =

Sports governing body organizing ice hockey and roller inline hockey in Australia

Australia
- Association name: Ice Hockey Australia
- IIHF Code: AUS
- IIHF membership: 11 February 1938
- President: Tim Kitching
- IIHF men's ranking: 34
- IIHF women's ranking: 28

The Australian Ice Hockey Federation, currently trading as Ice Hockey Australia (IHA), is the official national governing body of ice hockey in Australia and is a member of the International Ice Hockey Federation. It was first established in 1908, making it one of the oldest national ice hockey associations in the world.

The purpose of Ice Hockey Australia is to encourage, promote, control and administer all forms of ice hockey in and throughout Australia through and by various Member States for the mutual and collective benefit of the members and sport itself.

IHA also governs an eight-team, semi-professional league, known as the Australian Ice Hockey League.

== History ==
=== The beginnings of Australian ice sports ===
The beginnings of ice sports in Australia are traced back to the evening of Wednesday 12 October 1904 during a carnival held at the Adelaide Glaciarium, the first ice rink built in Australia. This important location for Australian ice sports began as a Cyclorama, which opened on Friday 28 November 1890 at 89 Hindley Street, Adelaide. On the evening of Tuesday 6 September 1904, the building was reopened after being remodeled by a new group called the Ice Palace Skating Company, owned by H. Newman Reid and referred to as the Glaciarium or Ice Palace Skating Rink. On the evening of Wednesday 12 October 1904 a match for what was called "hockey on the ice" was held during the carnival at the Adelaide Glaciarium. This game was not ice hockey, it was an adaption of roller polo to the ice using ice skates instead of roller skates. At the time this version of roller polo adapted to the ice was being played in Adelaide, ice hockey was already a well established sport and had been codified for almost 30 years. Though what was played in Adelaide was being called "hockey on the ice", it was not ice hockey.

=== The beginnings of ice hockey ===
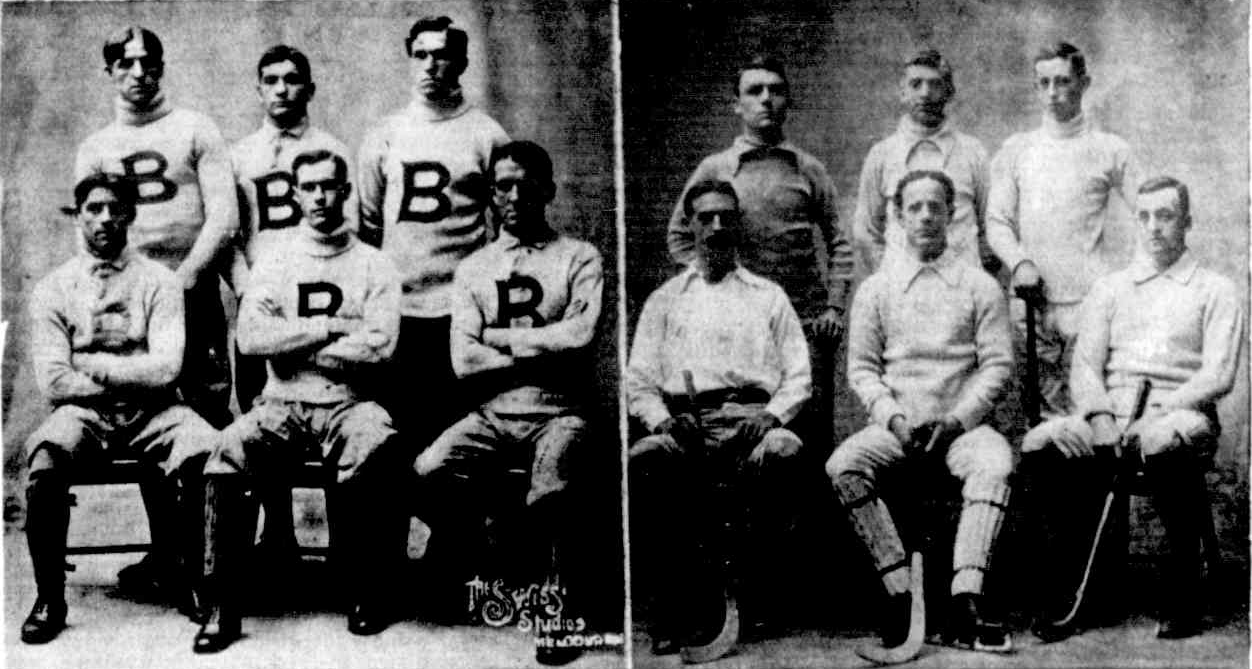
Both teams from the first Ice Hockey game in Australia, 17 July 1906. National Library of Australia

The birthplace of ice hockey in Australia was in the Melbourne Glaciarium in Melbourne and was the first time and place that ice hockey had been played in the country. An exhibition of ice hockey was held at the end of the opening night of the Melbourne Glaciarium on the afternoon of 9 June 1906, at 16 City Road, South Melbourne Victoria.

The first recorded game of ice hockey in Australia was on Tuesday 17 July 1906 and was between a Victorian representative team and the American sailors from the visiting American warship the USS Baltimore. The game was a deviation from the ice hockey already being played in Canada so this first game is regarded as a first step in the evolution of the Australian game into the already established game of ice hockey. The teams had been practicing for 4 weeks leading up to the game. The game was a variation of the Canadian game being played at the time, it was played in two 15 minutes halves, using a red ball the size of a tennis ball and made from gutta-percha and curved heavy-headed sticks as used in English field hockey at the time. The teams consisted of 6 men per side with the following positions: Goal-Keeper, Half Back, Center, Left Rush and Right Rush. It is better said that this game was the first step of the Australian game evolving into contemporary ice hockey as it still differed from the already popular Canadian game at the time.

At the time, the Canadian game of ice hockey was being played with a puck, and included a 7th position called a Rover and was played onside – which meant that forward passing was not allowed. The McGill Rules were first published on 27 February 1877 in the Montreal newspaper, The Gazette. It was essentially the same set of rules to the already established game of field hockey and even continued to use the word ball within the set of rules for ice hockey. One of the defining characteristics of the game of ice hockey at the time of the first Australian game was that it used a puck instead of a ball, this distinguished it from similar stick and ball games at the time such as bandy.

The American team was made up of:

- Warrant Machinist F. G. Randell (team captain) – center
- Seaman F. Brooks
- First-class Fireman Percival Howard Miller – half-back
- Seaman J. Benditti
- First Class fireman D. F. Kelly – goal-keeper
- Third Class Gunner's mate J. T. Connolly – rush

The Australian team was made up of:

- Herbert John Blatchly (team captain)
- Dunbar Poole – center
- James Service Thonemann – half back
- Ramsay Salmon – left rush
- Gordon David Langridge
- C. Kelly

Professor James Brewer was the umpire.

The Australian team were dressed in all white and the team from USS Baltimore wore white shirts with a large upper case black B on the front and center of the chest and grey trousers with red socks.

This game was held in the Melbourne Glaciarium and at 9:00pm a whistle blew to clear the public skaters from the ice surface so that the surface could be cleaned with scoops and brooms to remove the snowy covering generated by the public skating session before. The skill level of the Australians was not seen to be up to the level of the Americans as the American team had played as a team before against another American ship on a frozen river near Shanghai and defeated them. The Australians had never played as a team before but had the advantage of having been on the ice more recently than the American team. The game was hard-fought and result of the game was a 1–1 tie. The USS Baltimore team were first to score when Mr. T. H. Miller scored goal but Mr. Dunbar Poole scored off a hard shot to tie up the game.

In its second ice skating season, the Sydney Glaciarium management drew plans to facilitate ice hockey matches between an Australian team selected from ice skating patrons and teams drawn from the crew of various visiting fleet of American warships, known by the name Great White Fleet. Sydney was the first stop made by the fleet to Australia and invitations to the proposed hockey match were sent to the officers and petty officers of each warship, planning to host the match on the evening of their arrival on 20 August 1908. The first match that was arranged ended up being scheduled for the evening of 26 August 1907 at the Sydney Glaciarium. Though the American team had not been on skates for 3 years, they still managed to win the game 5 – 1 against the Australian team formed from Sydney Glaciarium patrons. The Australian team was first to score but the Americans would tie up the game in the first half. In the second half, the Americans would go on to score 4 more goals. An important aspect to this game was that the American players were using much larger hockey sticks than the local Australian team.

On 1 September 1908 the fleet would also visit Melbourne afterwards where they would play ice hockey against a local team, presumably again, using the larger ice hockey sticks and a puck made from a disc of wood. Due to the absence of 2 of the American players, each team played with only 5 men per side in the first game instead of the 7 normally played but this would play an important part to establishing the codified version of ice hockey in Australia rather than the Australian variant played before. The Victorian team won the first game 9 – 2 at the Melbourne Glaciarium.

In the second game played 2 days later on 3 September 1908, each team had 7 men per side available and played with a rubber puck. The Victorians benefited greatly by the visit from the Canadian lacrosse team that had visited months before as they became more skilled at "nursing" or cradling the puck. The game was refereed by Walter Purbrick and the Victorians defeated the Americans 6 – 4.

=== The first association ===
The first Australian ice hockey association was formed in Melbourne, Victoria on 12 September 1908 after the close of the season in the Melbourne Glaciarium. The name of the association was the Victorian Amateur Ice Hockey Association (VAIHA). The association consisted of 4 ice hockey clubs:

- Beavers
- Brighton
- Glaciarium
- Melburnians

The first state championship series in Australia was held in the Melbourne Glaciarium between 14 September 1909 – 27 September 1909. The grand final was held on the evening of 27 September 1909 and was between the Glaciarium and Melburnians. The Glaciarium won the championship final by a score of 3-0 and were awarded gold medals.

=== Interstate ice hockey ===
The first ice hockey team representing Victoria 1909

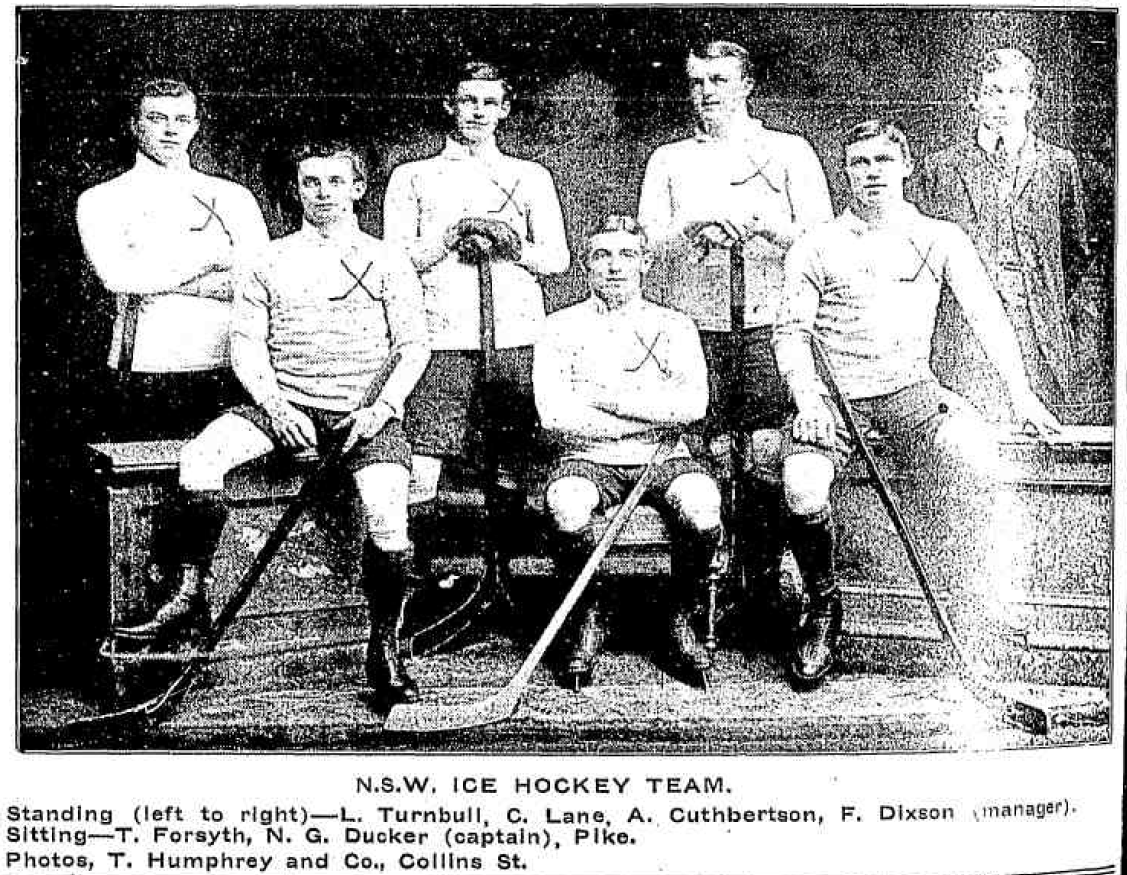
The first ice hockey team representing New South Wales 1909

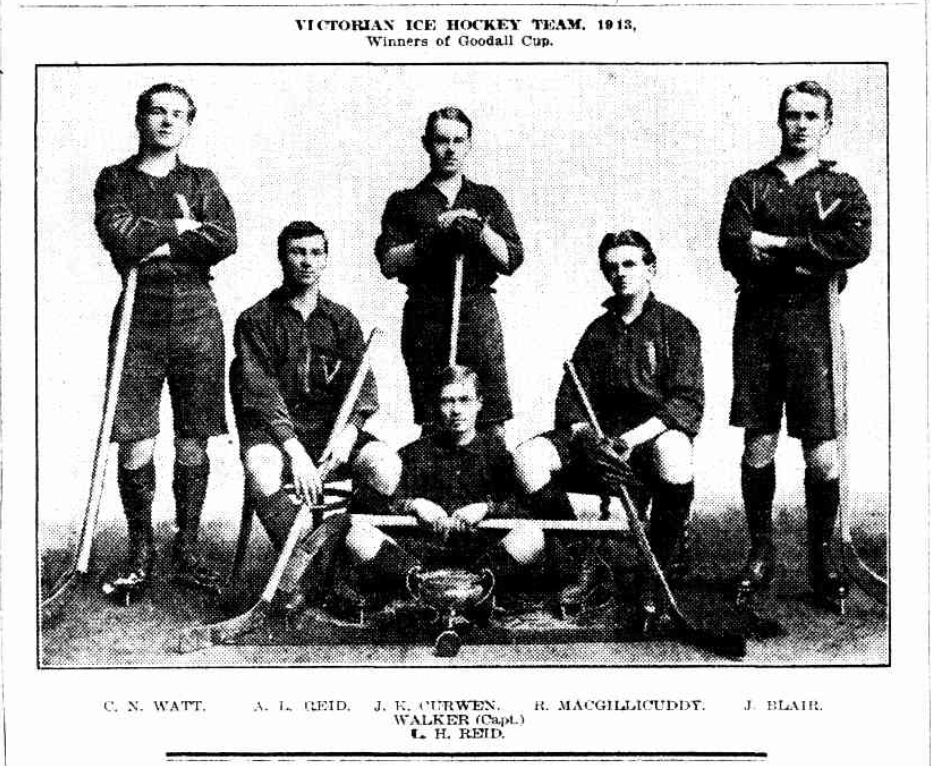
Victoria – Goodall Cup Champions 1913

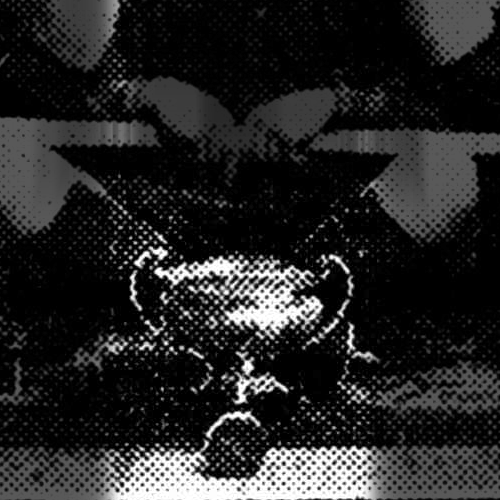
1913 version of the Goodall Cup

Ice Hockey matches between Victoria and New South Wales would begin almost immediately after the 25 July 1907 opening of the Sydney Glaciarium, with a match scheduled for 5 August 1907 that pre-dated the formation of State Associations.

The first inter-state ice hockey championship was held between a state representative team from Victoria and from New South Wales between 31 August-4 September 1909. This tournament was a best-of-3 format and saw Victoria win the series 2 games to 1. New South Wales was represented by a newly formed team in 1909 and traveled to Melbourne on 29 August 1909 which marked the first national interstate competition for senior men's hockey in Australia. The Victoria state team won the inaugural tournament to become the first winners of the interstate competition, with Robert Jackson as the captain who scored 3 goals in the second half of the final game.

The first game of the series had a final score of 2–1 with New South Wales defeating Victoria. Friday 3 September 1909 the Victorian team defeated the New South Wales team 1–0, giving Victorian goaltender Charles Watt the first recorded shutout in Australian interstate ice hockey competition history. In the third game of the series both teams had won a game each. Victoria defeated New South Wales 6-1 and became the first team to win the interstate competition in Australia.

18 September 1911 was the third game of the 1911 interstate ice hockey competition series. Jim Kendall was on crutches due to splitting his shinbone from a blow to the leg with a hockey stick in the previous game and was unable to play but New South Wales had already clinched the series after winning the first 2 games. Dunbar Poole was unable to stay and had also left, leaving the New South Wales team short 2 players. A decision was made to complete the final game of the series with a composite team of Dark Blue and Light Blue teams made up of the Victoria and New South Wales teams and emergency back up players for the Victorian team. The first half of the game saw 2 goals by Leslie Reid and one by Keith Walker place the Light Blue team in front by a score of 3–1, C. Smith scoring the goal for the Dark blue team. The second half of the game saw a comeback by the dark blue side with 3 goals by Jack Pike and a goal to Reid and Smith. The final score was 6–3 in favor of the Dark Blue team. The newly appointed second president of the VAIHA, Philip John Rupert Steele Sr, presented a cup gifted by John Edwin Goodall to the injured New South Wales captain Jim Kendall on the evening after the final game of this series.

=== The Great War ===
The first ice sports to be held at the Sydney Glaciarium for the 1914 season were scheduled for 4 August 1914 which involved skating for men and women as well as a women's hockey game. The Goodall Cup interstate series was scheduled to be played in the Sydney Glaciarium in the last 2 weeks of August 2014.

Efforts were made to continue the ice hockey season in 1915 and there was the promise of ice hockey games being scheduled. The Melbourne Glaciarium remained open and ladies skating events were held during this time.

31 July 1918 a hockey game between a blue team and white team was held at the Melbourne Glaciarium in which Ferrera's Blue team scored in the second half of the game to defeat the White team.

1923 saw a big step forward on the national level. While the Victorian team was visiting Sydney for the Goodall Cup series, a central body was formed to control the game on an Australia wide basis. Players were now receiving equipment from Canada and some were beginning to wear production and homemade protective padding and gloves. The twenties drew to a close with New South Wales still dominating the interstate scene. The tragic economic depression was sweeping the world and entertainment was something people listed very low on their budgets.

The early 1930s were remarkable for the development in the strength and character of Australian Ice Hockey. Inter state growth was on the rise and new faces joined the sport, whose names are still known to this day. With the outbreak of war in the later part of the decade, as was the case in the First World War, hockey players were quick to join up and several were decorated for their devoted and heroic service to their country.

=== 1922: The first national women's tournament ===
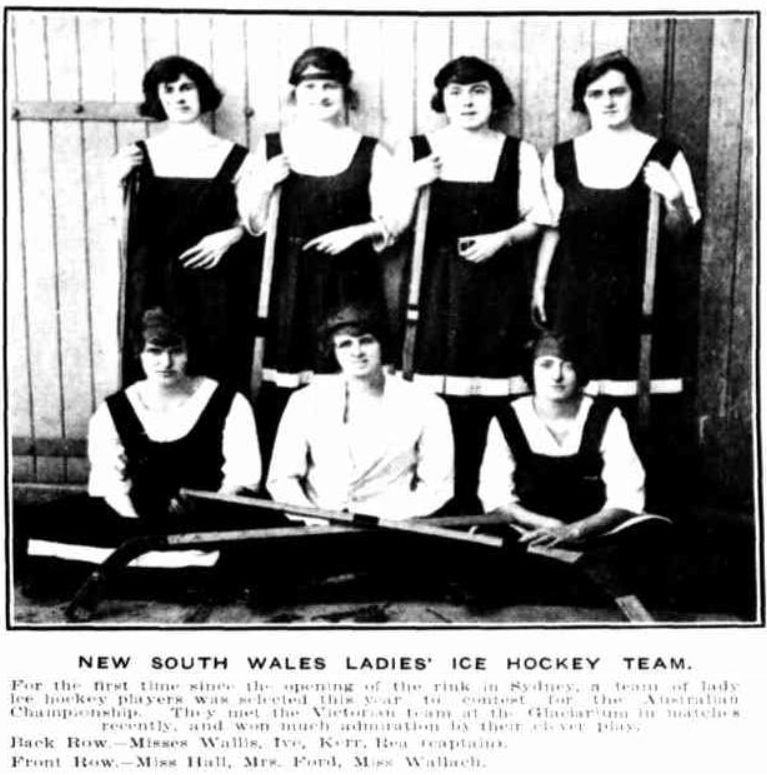
The first women's ice hockey team representing New South Wales 1922

The first inter-state women's ice hockey championship tournament was held in the first week in August 1922 between New South Wales and Victoria, New South Wales won the first game of the series 3–0.

Scheduled between 20 and 23 October 1988 was the inaugural Australian Women's Championship

=== 1923–1931 AIHA: The first national ice hockey association ===
In 1923 the first national federation for ice hockey in Australia formed and was named the Australian Ice Hockey Association. John Edwin Goodall became the first elected president and A. De Long became the first elected Secretary/ Treasurer. The Goodall Cup would remain as the trophy awarded to the inter state championship for men and the Gower Cup would continue to be awarded to the inter state championship for women until at least 1928.

In 1930 a proposal for the formation of the Australian Ice Hockey Council was proposed and constituted afterwards in a meeting in Melbourne. A meeting was scheduled for the 1931 Interstate Series in Sydney, when the Victorian team would visit.

=== 1926: The first junior ice hockey competition ===
During the annual meeting of the Ice Hockey Association on the evening of 17 May 1926 at the Melbourne Glaciarium, the plans for a junior ice hockey competition were made. The officers elected during this meeting were Mr. Sutherland (President), Mr. G. Bannerman, (Secretary), Mr. A. de Long (Treasurer).

=== 1938: AAIAA the breakaway association ===
On the evening of 20 September 1938 a private meeting was held at the Sydney Ice Palais between players, speed skaters and other interested people regarding the attitude the New South Wales Ice Hockey Association had adopted with regard to allegations of illegal and rough play during recent ice hockey games. The meeting was held to discuss the refusal by the New South Wales Ice Hockey Association (NSWIHA) to give guarantees that their referees would be instructed to enforce the ice hockey rules set out by the NSWIHA and eliminate the widely criticised illegal play made by the media, players and general public. The meeting was also there to discuss the NSWIHA decision to cancel all of its games at the Sydney Ice Palais. A notion was passed which strongly condemned the New South Wales Ice Hockey Association for not providing the guarantee that they would instruct their referees to enforce the rules during the games and a unanimous decision was made that the 40 attendees that represented NSWIHA would submit their resignation from the NSWIHA immediately. In addition to this, all attendees of this meeting would unite to form a breakaway national association called the Australian Amateur Ice Athletics Association (AAIAA) to control all ice sports including ice hockey and promote ice sports in Australia. New South Wales Ice Hockey Association was still affiliated with the Australian Ice Hockey Council (AIHC).

The presence of the breakaway association addressed the need to recognise the Sydney Ice Palais as it was not recognised by the Australian Ice Hockey Council nor were undefeated Canadian Bears ice hockey club that were scheduled to play against a team representing Australia. It also created conflict. The games were for 15, 19, 21 October 1938 against the undefeated Canadian Bears team that played there. In a meeting on the evening of 30 September 1938 the New South Wales Ice Hockey Association, still affiliated with the Australian Ice Hockey Council threatened to ban any players that partook in the game against the Bears. Four Victorian players (Ellis Kelly, C. Mitchell, H. Lloyd and Johnny White) were selected to join the Australian team to play against the Canadian Bears and were determined to play in the games but for that to happen The Victorian Ice Hockey Association needed to break away from the Australian Ice Hockey Council and join the Australian Amateur Ice Athletics Association for them to be eligible. If the Victorian Ice Hockey Association remained with the Australian Ice Hockey Council and the 4 players participated in the games against the Canadian Bears the 4 players would be banned from playing under the Australian Ice Hockey Council.

=== Middle years ===
When ice hockey was ready to be resumed after World War II, the position regarding players was the best it had ever been. A ready made pool of youngsters was waiting to join the returning servicemen in what were to become the boom years of the game. In 1947, Victoria won the Goodall Cup after 25 years of being in the wilderness. The next year 1951, the association became the strongest it has ever been. The association took steps to have only four teams in each rink brought about ability to concentrate the quality of the teams, and have a better quality of game.

In 1980 it was decided by the Australian Ice Hockey Federation that, for the first time, it would be mandatory for players under the age of 18 to wear full face masks beginning in the 1981 season. This was in the interest of greater player safety and would bring Australia in line with international regulations. The decision was based on evidence of a marked decline in facial and dental injuries to players aged under 16 years old who had this mandatory face mask regulation introduced the year before.

The first Australian Junior team was scheduled to represent Australia in the 1983 world junior championships. In 1981 the Australian Ice Hockey Federation established a national junior training camp, with the first training sessions to be held between 29 May 1981 to 31 May 1981 at Narrabeen Fitness Camp. It was planned that 65 junior ice hockey players from around Australia would attend the camp, hoping to be selected to represent Australia in junior hockey for the first time.

== National teams ==
Each year Ice Hockey Australia participates in a number of international championships that are held by the International Ice Hockey Federation.

- Men's senior team competes at the Ice Hockey World Championships.
- Women's senior team competes at the IIHF World Women's Championships.
- Men's under-20 team competes at the IIHF World U20 Championship.
- Men's under-18 team competes at the IIHF World U18 Championship.
- Men's para team
- Women's para team competes at the World Para Ice Hockey Women's World Championships.
- Men's senior inline hockey team competes at the IIHF InLine Hockey World Championship.

== Affiliated organizations ==
Ice Hockey Australia has many state branches across the country:

- Australian Capital Territory Ice Hockey Association
- New South Wales Ice Hockey Association
- Ice Hockey Queensland
- South Australia Ice Hockey Association
- Ice Hockey Tasmania
- Victorian Ice Hockey Association
- Western Australian Ice Hockey Association

In addition to the above, there are three organisations affiliated to IHA, with responsibility for the control of ice hockey within their own organisations but remaining under the rules and regulations of IHA. The affiliated bodies are:

- Australian Ice Hockey League
- Australian Women's Ice Hockey League
- Australian Junior Ice Hockey League
- Old-timers Ice Hockey Australia Network

== National Championship Awards and Trophies ==
=== Goodall Cup ===
The Goodall Cup is a perpetual trophy that is annually awarded to the playoff champions of the Australian Ice Hockey League (AIHL). The trophy is named after Australian born player John Edwin Goodall who donated a cup to the Interstate competition originally held annually between state representative teams for Victoria and New South Wales. The Interstate competition began in 1909 and John Edwin Goodall gifted a cup to the interstate series in 1911.

=== Joan McKowen Memorial Trophy ===
The Joan McKowen Memorial Trophy is awarded to the winners of the playoffs for the national senior women's competition, the Australian Women's Ice Hockey League. The trophy is named in memory of Joan Moreen McKowen and was established in 1994.

=== Nathan Walker Trophy ===
Formerly referred to as The AJIHL Champions Trophy due to not having a name, the award was renamed the Nathan Walker Trophy for the 2018-19 Australian Junior Ice Hockey League season, in honor of Australia's first player to make it to the National Hockey League - Nathan Walker. The Nathan Walker Trophy is awarded to the winners of the playoffs for the national junior men's ice hockey competition, the Australian Junior Ice Hockey League. The cup was donated by the Old-timers Ice Hockey Australia Network in 2012 for the inaugural season for the AJIHL.

=== Jim Brown Shield ===
The Jim Brown Shield is awarded to the winner of the interstate tournament for men aged 17 years and older (AIHL players 24 years old and older must have played less than 6 AIHL games) . The trophy is a shield named after James Archibald Brown, a Scottish born migrant who was an ice hockey champion and speed skating champion record holder. In 1964 the president of the New South Wales Ice Hockey Association, Harry Curtis, donated the Jim Brown Shield for the interstate junior ice hockey tournament aged 18 years and under in the name of James Archibald "Jimmy" Brown who had died five years before.

=== National Championships ===
Since 2024, 4 tournaments are held over the course of 2 weeks at a single venue as part of the National Championships.

==== Stephanie Boxall Trophy ====
The Stephanie Boxall Trophy is awarded to the winning state team of the women's national tournament. The trophy is named after founding member and former captain of the Australian women's national team, Stephanie Boxall, a two-time winner of the McKowen Trophy

==== Syd Tange Trophy ====
The Syd Tange Trophy is awarded to the winning state team of the 18-under national tournament. The trophy is named after Sydney Edward Tange (1917–2005).

==== Kurt DeFris Trophy ====
The Kurt DeFris Trophy is awarded to the winning state team of the 15-under national tournament.

==== Phillip Ginsberg Memorial Trophy ====
The Phillip Ginsberg Memorial Trophy is awarded to the winning state team of the 13-under national tournament.

=== John McCrae – Williamson Memorial Trophy ===
The John McCrae – Williamson Memorial Trophy was awarded to the winning state team of the 13-under national tournament from 2002 until the tournament was replaced by a "Jamboree".

== Presidents ==
- 1980 – John Purcell
- 1981 – Phillip Ginsberg
- 1984 – Phillip Ginsberg
- 1985 – Phillip Ginsberg
- 1987 – Phillip Ginsberg
- 1988 – Phillip Ginsberg
- 1998 – Don Rurak
- 1999 – Don Rurak
- 2000 – Don Rurak
- 2001 – Don Rurak
- 2002 – Don Rurak
- 2003 – Don Rurak
- 2004 – Don Rurak
- 2005 – Don Rurak
- 2006 – Don Rurak
- 2008 – Don Rurak
- 2010 – Don Rurak
- 2012 – Don Rurak / Kevin Brown
- 2014 – Clive Connelly
- 2015 – Clive Connelly
- 2016 – Clive Connelly
- 2017 – Clive Connelly
- 2018 – Clive Connelly
- 2019 – Miranda Ransome
- 2022 - Grove Bennett Jr / Ryan O'Handley
- 2023 - Ryan O'Handley
- 2024 - Ryan O'Handley
- 2025 - Ryan O'Handley
- 2026 - Tim Kitching

== See also ==
- Australian Women's Ice Hockey League
- Australian Junior Ice Hockey League
- Australia men's national para ice hockey team
- Goodall Cup
- Joan McKowen Memorial Trophy
- Jim Brown Trophy
