= 2017–18 AWIHL season =

- League: Australian Women's Ice Hockey League
- Sport: Ice hockey
- Duration: 28 October 2017 – 18 March 2018

Regular season
- Premiers: Sydney Sirens
- Season MVP: Stephanie Cochrane (Sydney Sirens)
- Top scorer: Jessica Pinkerton (26 points) (Melbourne Ice)

Joan McKowen Memorial Trophy
- Champions: Melbourne Ice (6th title)
- Runners-up: Sydney Sirens

AWIHL seasons
- 2016–17 2018–19

The 2017–18 AWIHL season is the 11th season of the Australian Women's Ice Hockey League (AWIHL). It ran from 28 October 2017 until 18 March 2018. Four teams competed in 24 regular season games followed by 4 playoff games, making up the AWIHL Finals weekend. The Sydney Sirens claimed the premiership title for finishing top of the regular season standings, while the Melbourne Ice claimed the Joan McKowen Memorial Trophy championship title by winning the grand final. Melbourne finished runner-up in the season standings while Sydney lost the grand final. Adelaide Rush came last in the regular season and claimed the wooden spoon.

== Teams ==
In 2017–18 the AWIHL had four teams from four Australian state capital cities competing, stretching across the east coast and southern Australian mainland. Perth Inferno was added as an exhibition team only for the 2017–18 season, as they looked to meet criteria set down by the AWIHL Commission to be granted a full licence for 2018–19.

2017–18 AWIHL teams
Team	City	Arena	Head Coach	Captain
Adelaide Rush	(South Australia) Adelaide	IceArenA	(Australia) Josef Rezek	(United States) Ashley Pelkey
Brisbane Goannas	(Queensland) Brisbane	Boondall Iceworld	(Australia) Terry Kiliwnik	(Australia) Veronica Watson
Melbourne Ice	(Victoria (state)) Melbourne	O'Brien Icehouse	(Australia) Marcus Wong	(Australia) Shona Powell
Sydney Sirens	(New South Wales) Sydney	Macquarie Ice Rink	(Australia) Troy Morgan	(Australia) Amelia Matheson
Exhibition teams
Perth Inferno	(Western Australia) Perth	Cockburn Ice Arena	(Australia) Paul Graham

== League Business ==
The official AWIHL gameday schedule was released at the start of September 2017. The season structure remained unchanged from 2016 to 2017, each team competing in a four-game series against each other team, playing two games at home and two games away. Looking to become the first AWIHL expansion team, Perth Inferno, was admitted to the league on a provisional licence to play two exhibition games against the Sydney Sirens. The first of these two exhibition games, at Canterbury Olympic Ice Rink, was to be live streamed by Thought Fox Media Group with commentary by Eric Brookes. Ahead of the season, the AWIHL announced the continuation of their sponsorship agreement with Skaters Network in November 2017. The agreement would continue the company's status as preferred equipment supplier to the AWIHL and the naming rights holder for the player of the month award. Ice Hockey Australia also announced the establishment and go-live of the league's new website, hosted on the Ice Hockey Australia's website, it contains separate pages for each team, news, history and is linked to the eSportsdesk website that contains all information on games, players, scores and stats. Every AWIHL game of the 2017–18 season would be live streamed on the new website. In December 2017, AWIHL commissioner, Melissa Rulli, announced the league had secured an event assistance grant under the Victorian Government's Significant Sporting Events Program, to host the AWIHL Finals weekend in Melbourne at O'Brien Group Arena.

== Regular season ==
=== Fixtures and results ===
Running between 28 October 2017 and 4 March 2018, the AWIHL regular season consisted of 24 games in total, with teams playing 12 games each, 4 games (2 home and 2 away) against each opponent. There additionally was two exhibition games scheduled for Sydney in February 2018 between the Sydney Sirens and prospective expansion side Perth Inferno. The Sirens won both games comfortably against the exhibition Perth team, scoring sixteen goals and conceding five.

==== October ====
October
Game #	Date	Time	Away	Score	Home	Location	Recap
1	28 October 2017	17:00	Adelaide Rush	2–6	Sydney Sirens	Canterbury Olympic Ice Rink
2	28 October 2017	17:00	Brisbane Goannas	0–2	Melbourne Ice	O'Brien Group Arena
3	29 October 2017	10:00	Adelaide Rush	4–9	Sydney Sirens	Liverpool Catholic Club Ice Rink
4	29 October 2017	13:15	Brisbane Goannas	1–6	Melbourne Ice	O'Brien Group Arena

==== November ====
November
Game #	Date	Time	Away	Score	Home	Location	Recap
5	11 November 2017	16:30	Brisbane Goannas	3–2 (SO)	Adelaide Rush	IceArenA
6	12 November 2017	10:00	Brisbane Goannas	2–4	Adelaide Rush	IceArenA
7	18 November 2017	17:00	Sydney Sirens	3–0	Melbourne Ice	O'Brien Group Arena
8	19 November 2017	11:15	Sydney Sirens	4–2	Melbourne Ice	O'Brien Group Arena

==== December ====
December
Game #	Date	Time	Away	Score	Home	Location	Recap
9	2 December 2017	16:30	Melbourne Ice	3–2	Adelaide Rush	IceArenA
10	3 December 2017	10:00	Melbourne Ice	7–4	Adelaide Rush	IceArenA
11	9 December 2017	17:00	Brisbane Goannas	1–2	Sydney Sirens	Canterbury Olympic Ice Rink
12	10 December 2017	10:00	Brisbane Goannas	0–4	Sydney Sirens	Liverpool Catholic Club Ice Rink

==== January ====
January
Game #	Date	Time	Away	Score	Home	Location	Recap
13	13 January 2018	16:00	Sydney Sirens	10–4	Brisbane Goannas	Boondall Iceworld
14	13 January 2018	17:00	Adelaide Rush	1–9	Melbourne Ice	O'Brien Group Arena
15	14 January 2018	07:30	Sydney Sirens	4–0	Brisbane Goannas	Boondall Iceworld
16	14 January 2018	15:15	Adelaide Rush	1–8	Melbourne Ice	O'Brien Group Arena

==== February ====
February
Game #	Date	Time	Away	Score	Home	Location	Recap
17	3 February 2018	16:00	Adelaide Rush	2–1 (SO)	Brisbane Goannas	Boondall Iceworld
18	4 February 2018	07:30	Adelaide Rush	3–7	Brisbane Goannas	Boondall Iceworld
19	10 February 2018	17:00	Melbourne Ice	4–0	Sydney Sirens	Canterbury Olympic Ice Rink
20	11 February 2018	10:00	Melbourne Ice	0–6	Sydney Sirens	Liverpool Catholic Club Ice Rink
EX	17 February 2018	17:00	Perth Inferno	4–8	Sydney Sirens	Canterbury Olympic Ice Rink
EX	18 February 2018	10:00	Perth Inferno	1–8	Sydney Sirens	Liverpool Catholic Club Ice Rink
21	24 February 2018	16:30	Sydney Sirens	2–4	Adelaide Rush	IceArenA
22	25 February 2018	10:00	Sydney Sirens	7–0	Adelaide Rush	IceArenA

==== March ====
March
Game #	Date	Time	Away	Score	Home	Location	Recap
23	3 March 2018	16:00	Melbourne Ice	0–1	Brisbane Goannas	Boondall Iceworld
24	4 March 2018	07:30	Melbourne Ice	6–2	Brisbane Goannas	Boondall Iceworld

Key:

Winner	Exhibition game

=== Standings ===
Pos	Team	Pld	W	OTW	OTL	L	GF	GA	GD	Pts	Qualification or relegation
1	Sydney Sirens	12	10	0	0	2	57	21	+36	30	2018 Joan McKowen Finals
2	Melbourne Ice (C)	12	8	0	0	4	47	25	+22	24	2018 Joan McKowen Finals
3	Brisbane Goannas	12	2	1	1	8	22	45	−23	9	2018 Joan McKowen Finals
4	Adelaide Rush	12	2	1	1	8	29	64	−35	9	2018 Joan McKowen Finals

Source: AWIHL Elite Prospects
Rules for classification:
Tie-break: 1) points; 2) goal difference; 3) number of goals scored
Points: 3 points for regulation win; 2 points for OT or SO win; 1 point for OT or SO loss or tie/draw; 0 points for regulation loss
(C) Champion

=== Player stats ===
The season's league leader statistics for skaters and goaltenders.

Goals
No.	Name	Pos	G
1	(Australia) Stephenie Cochrane	Forward	15
2	(Canada) Jessica Pinkerton	Forward	14
3	(Australia) Sharna Godfrey	Forward	11
4	(Canada) Christina Julien	Forward	11
5	(Australia) Natalie Ayris	Forward	11

Assists
No.	Name	Pos	A
1	(Australia) Kristelle van der Wolf	Forward	14
2	(Canada) Jessica Pinkerton	Forward	12
3	(Australia) Amelia Matheson	Defender	11
4	(Australia) Sharna Godfrey	Forward	10
5	(Canada) Erin Beaver	Defender	10

Points
No.	Name	Pos	P
1	(Canada) Jessica Pinkerton	Forward	26
2	(Australia) Sharna Godfrey	Forward	21
3	(Australia) Stephenie Cochrane	Forward	19
4	(Australia) Kristelle van der Wolf	Forward	19
5	(Australia) Natalie Ayris	Forward	18

Penalty minutes
No.	Name	Pos	PIM
1	(Australia) Rylie Ellis	Defender	33
2	(Australia) Nicole Jones	Forward	24
3	(Australia) Tracy Hocutt	Forward	24
4	(United Kingdom) Kirsty Venus	Defender	22
5	(Australia) Sharnita Crompton	Forward	18

Save percentage
No.	Name	Pos	SV%
1	(Australia) Imogen Perry	Goaltender	0.943
2	(Australia) Ella Licari	Goaltender	0.936
3	(Australia) Jenelle Carson	Goaltender	0.936
4	(Australia) Ruth Brophy	Goaltender	0.895
5	(Australia) Ashleigh Brown	Goaltender	0.886

Goals against average
No.	Name	Pos	GAA
1	(Australia) Ella Licari	Goaltender	1.13
2	(Australia) Imogen Perry	Goaltender	1.46
3	(Australia) Jenelle Carson	Goaltender	1.53
4	(Australia) Ruth Brophy	Goaltender	1.67
5	(Australia) Paula Morris	Goaltender	2.75

=== Season awards ===
Below lists the 2017–18 AWIHL regular season award winners.

Award	Name	Team
Skaters Network Most Valuable Player	(Australia) Stephanie Cochrane	Sydney Sirens
Best Forward	(United States) Ashley Pelkey	Adelaide Rush
Best Defence	(Canada) Erin Beaver	Sydney Sirens
Best Goaltender	(Australia) Keesha Aitkins	Adelaide Rush
Nellie Gee Rookie of the Year	(Australia) Marnie Pullin	Melbourne Ice

== Joan McKowen playoffs ==
The top four teams in the AWIHL regular season qualify for the Joan McKowen Memorial Trophy playoffs. The playoffs is held on a single weekend and uses Australian conventions of being called Finals. The playoff system used by the AWIHL is a four team single game semi-finals and grand final system where the semi-final winners progress to the grand final and the losers playoff for third place. Semi-finals are played on the Saturday and the third place playoff and grand final is played on the Sunday. The prize for being crowned AWIHL Champions for winning the grand final is the Joan McKowen Memorial Trophy.

In 2017–18, the Adelaide Rush, Sydney Sirens, Brisbane Goannas and Melbourne Ice qualified for the finals weekend. The event was held on 17 and 18 March 2018 in host city Melbourne at O’Brien Group Arena. On Saturday, Sydney won the first semi final in a high scoring affair against Adelaide. In the second semi-final, the Melbourne Ice made light work of Brisbane to advance to the grand final. On Sunday, first up, the Goannas won a close contest against the Rush to secure bronze medals for the Queenslanders. In the grand final, Melbourne Ice secured their record equaling sixth championship title and lifted the Joan McKowen Memorial Trophy, after defeating the Sydney Sirens 4–2, with Jessica Pinkerton scoring all four goals for the winners.

Semi-finals
17 March - Melbourne
Adelaide Rush	4
Sydney Sirens	7
17 March - Melbourne
Brisbane Goannas	1
Melbourne Ice	5

Joan McKowen Final
18 March - Melbourne
Melbourne Ice	4
Sydney Sirens	2
Third place
18 March - Melbourne
Brisbane Goannas	2
Adelaide Rush	1

=== Semi-finals ===
17 March 2018; 15:00	Adelaide Rush	4–7 (0–0, 3–4, 1–3)	Sydney Sirens	O’Brien Group Arena

Game reference

Keesha Atkins
Goalies
Ella Licari
Referee:
Gabby Aston
Linesmen:
Beth Bowshall
Kj Kim

(Unassisted) Wright	1–0
(Pelkey) Ayris	2–0
	2–1	Edmonds (Embrey)
	2–2	Murphy (Unassisted)
	2–3	Cochrane (Godfrey, Harvey)
(Unassisted) Reynolds	3–3
	3–4	Harvey (Unassisted)
(Unassisted) Reynolds	4–4
	4–5	Edmonds (Crompton)
	4–6	Matheson (Cochrane, McOnie)
	4–7	McOnie (Harvey)

4 min
Penalties
8 min
22
Shots
37

17 March 2018; 17:30	Brisbane Goannas	1–5 (0–0, 1–5, 0–0)	Melbourne Ice	O’Brien Group Arena

Game reference

Ashleigh Brown
Goalies
Jenelle Carson
Referee:
Ainslie Gardner
Linesmen:
Peta Goulden
Cien Pereira

	0–1	Julien (Green, Pinkerton)
	0–2	Pinkerton (Julien, van der Wolf)
(Robitaille) Kiliwnik	1–2
	1–3	Ellis (Julien)
	1–4	Julien (van der Wolf)
	1–5	Pinkerton (G.Carson)

16 min
Penalties
16 min
11
Shots
26

=== Third place playoff ===
18 March 2018; 14:30	Adelaide Rush	1–2 (0–1, 0–1, 1–0)	Brisbane Goannas	O’Brien Group Arena

Game reference

Keesha Atkins
Goalies
Imogen Perry
Referee:
Gabby Aston
Linesmen:
Kj Kim
Peta Goulden

	0–1	Watson (Kiliwnik)
	0–2	Costa (Kiliwnik)
(Venus) Ayris	1–2

6 min
Penalties
8 min
20
Shots
25

=== Final ===
18 March 2018; 17:00	Melbourne Ice	4–2 (1–0, 2–2, 1–0)	Sydney Sirens	O’Brien Group Arena

Game reference

Jenelle Carson
Goalies
Ella Licari
Referee:
Ainslie Gardner
Linesmen:
Beth Bowshall
Cien Pereira

(Ellis) Pinkerton	1–0
	1–1	Matheson
(Julien, Green) Pinkerton	2–1
	2–2	Godfrey
(Julien) Pinkerton	3–2
(van der Wolf) Pinkerton	4–2

12 min
Penalties
0 min
30
Shots
25

Gold	Silver	Bronze
(Victoria (state)) Melbourne Ice	(New South Wales) Sydney Sirens	(Queensland) Brisbane Goannas
