= 2018–19 AWIHL season =

- League: Australian Women's Ice Hockey League
- Sport: Ice hockey
- Duration: 27 October 2018 – 10 March 2019

Regular season
- Premiers: Melbourne Ice
- Season MVP: Sharna Godfrey (Sydney Sirens)
- Top scorer: Christina Julien (37 points) (Melbourne Ice)

Joan McKowen Memorial Trophy
- Champions: Melbourne Ice (7th title)
- Runners-up: Sydney Sirens

AWIHL seasons
- 2017–18 2019–20

The 2018–19 AWIHL season is the 12th season of the Australian Women's Ice Hockey League (AWIHL). It ran from 27 October 2018 until 10 March 2019. Five teams competed in 30 regular season games followed by 4 playoff games, making up the AWIHL Finals weekend. The Melbourne Ice claimed the double by winning both the premiership title for finishing top of the regular season standings and the Joan McKowen Memorial Trophy championship title by winning the grand final. Sydney Sirens finished runner-up to both titles and the Adelaide Rush claimed the wooden spoon.

== Teams ==
In 2018–19 the AWIHL had five teams from five Australian state capital cities competing, stretching east to west of the continent.

2018–19 AWIHL teams
Team	City	Arena	Head Coach	Captain
Adelaide Rush	(South Australia) Adelaide	IceArenA	(United Kingdom) Jamie Holland	(Australia) Candice Mitchell
Brisbane Goannas	(Queensland) Brisbane	Boondall Iceworld	(Australia) Matthew Gilpin	(Australia) Tracy Hocutt
Melbourne Ice	(Victoria (state)) Melbourne	O'Brien Group Arena	(Australia) Marcus Wong
Perth Inferno	(Western Australia) Perth	Cockburn Ice Arena	(Australia) Paul Graham
Sydney Sirens	(New South Wales) Sydney	Liverpool Catholic Club Ice Rink	(Australia) Jeff Helbren

== League Business ==
The AWIHL officially expanded for the first time on 9 August 2018, with the admission of expansion team Perth Inferno from Perth, Western Australia. The official AWIHL gameday schedule was released at the end of August 2018. The season structure had changed from 2017–18 thanks to the addition of a fifth team, with each team now playing two of the four opponents in a four-game series with the other two teams being played twice during the season.

== Regular season ==
=== Fixtures & results ===
Running between 27 October 2018 and 24 February 2019, the AWIHL regular season consisted of 30 games in total, with teams playing 12 games each.

==== October ====
October
Game #	Date	Time	Away	Score	Home	Location	Recap
1	27 October 2018	17:00	Brisbane Goannas	1–12	Melbourne Ice	O'Brien Group Arena
2	28 October 2018	13:15	Brisbane Goannas	0–7	Melbourne Ice	O'Brien Group Arena

==== November ====
November
Game #	Date	Time	Away	Score	Home	Location	Recap
3	3 November 2018	17:00	Melbourne Ice	4–3	Sydney Sirens	Liverpool Catholic Club Ice Rink
4	4 November 2018	09:15	Melbourne Ice	3–1	Sydney Sirens	Liverpool Catholic Club Ice Rink
5	10 November 2018	16:00	Perth Inferno	11–4	Adelaide Rush	IceArenA
6	11 November 2018	09:30	Perth Inferno	6–0	Adelaide Rush	IceArenA
7	24 November 2018	16:00	Brisbane Goannas	3–5	Adelaide Rush	IceArenA
8	24 November 2018	18:00	Sydney Sirens	9–2	Perth Inferno	Cockburn Ice Arena
9	25 November 2018	07:00	Sydney Sirens	8–1	Perth Inferno	Cockburn Ice Arena
10	25 November 2018	09:30	Brisbane Goannas	1–2	Adelaide Rush	IceArenA

==== December ====
December
Game #	Date	Time	Away	Score	Home	Location	Recap
11	1 December 2018	16:00	Sydney Sirens	4–3 (SO)	Brisbane Goannas	Boondall Iceworld
12	2 December 2018	07:00	Sydney Sirens	6–1	Brisbane Goannas	Boondall Iceworld
13	8 December 2018	17:00	Perth Inferno	3–9	Melbourne Ice	O'Brien Group Arena
14	9 December 2018	13:15	Perth Inferno	1–5	Melbourne Ice	O'Brien Group Arena
15	15 December 2018	17:00	Adelaide Rush	1–6	Sydney Sirens	Liverpool Catholic Club Ice Rink
16	16 December 2018	09:15	Adelaide Rush	0–8	Sydney Sirens	Liverpool Catholic Club Ice Rink

==== January ====
January
Game #	Date	Time	Away	Score	Home	Location	Recap
17	12 January 2019	16:00	Adelaide Rush	0–3	Brisbane Goannas	Boondall Iceworld
18	13 January 2019	07:00	Adelaide Rush	5–6	Brisbane Goannas	Boondall Iceworld
19	19 January 2019	18:00	Melbourne Ice	4–8	Perth Inferno	Cockburn Ice Arena
20	20 January 2019	09:30	Melbourne Ice	7–2	Perth Inferno	Cockburn Ice Arena

==== February ====
February
Game #	Date	Time	Away	Score	Home	Location	Recap
21	2 February 2019	17:00	Sydney Sirens	6–7	Melbourne Ice	O'Brien Group Arena
22	2 February 2019	18:00	Adelaide Rush	2–10	Perth Inferno	Cockburn Ice Arena
23	3 February 2019	09:30	Adelaide Rush	3–10	Perth Inferno	Cockburn Ice Arena
24	3 February 2019	13:15	Sydney Sirens	4–3 (SO)	Melbourne Ice	O'Brien Group Arena
25	16 February 2019	17:00	Brisbane Goannas	1–10	Sydney Sirens	Liverpool Catholic Club Ice Rink
26	17 February 2019	09:15	Brisbane Goannas	0–8	Sydney Sirens	Liverpool Catholic Club Ice Rink
27	23 February 2019	16:00	Perth Inferno	4–3	Brisbane Goannas	Boondall Iceworld
28	23 February 2019	16:00	Melbourne Ice	10–3	Adelaide Rush	IceArenA
29	24 February 2019	07:00	Perth Inferno	4–2	Brisbane Goannas	Boondall Iceworld
30	24 February 2019	09:30	Melbourne Ice	6–3	Adelaide Rush	IceArenA

Key:

Winner	Draw

=== Standings ===
Pos	Team	Pld	W	OTW	OTL	L	GF	GA	GD	Pts	Qualification or relegation
1	Melbourne Ice (C)	12	10	0	1	1	77	35	+42	31	2019 Joan McKowen Finals
2	Sydney Sirens	12	7	2	0	3	73	26	+47	25	2019 Joan McKowen Finals
3	Perth Inferno	12	7	0	0	5	62	56	+6	21	2019 Joan McKowen Finals
4	Brisbane Goannas	12	2	0	1	9	24	67	−43	7	2019 Joan McKowen Finals
5	Adelaide Rush	12	2	0	0	10	28	80	−52	6	

Source: AWIHL Elite Prospects
Rules for classification:
Tie-break: 1) points; 2) goal difference; 3) number of goals scored
Points: 3 points for regulation win; 2 points for OT or SO win; 1 point for OT or SO loss or tie/draw; 0 points for regulation loss
(C) Champion

=== Player stats ===
The season's league leader statistics for skaters and goaltenders.

Goals
No.	Name	Pos	G
1	(Canada) Christina Julien	Forward	24
2	(Australia) Sharna Godfrey	Forward	16
3	(Australia) Bettina Meyers	Forward	11
4	(United States) Ashlie Aparicio	Forward	10
5	(United States) Courtney Moulton	Forward	8

Assists
No.	Name	Pos	A
1	(United States) Elizabeth Scala	Forward	20
2	(Australia) Sharna Godfrey	Forward	18
3	(Australia) Bettina Meyers	Forward	15
4	(Canada) Christina Julien	Forward	13
5	(Australia) Michelle Clark-Crumpton	Forward	13

Points
No.	Name	Pos	P
1	(Canada) Christina Julien	Forward	37
2	(Australia) Sharna Godfrey	Forward	34
3	(United States) Elizabeth Scala	Forward	32
4	(Australia) Michelle Clark-Crumpton	Forward	29
5	(Australia) Bettina Meyers	Forward	26

Penalty minutes
No.	Name	Pos	PIM
1	(United Kingdom) Kirsty Venus	Defender	30
2	(Australia) Isla Malcolm	Defender	22
3	(Canada) Christina Julien	Forward	18
4	(Australia) Bettina Meyers	Forward	18
5	(United States) Courtney Moulton	Forward	18

Save percentage
No.	Name	Pos	SV%
1	(Turkey) Sera Dogramaci	Goaltender	0.913
2	(Australia) Ruth Brophy	Goaltender	0.904
3	(Australia) Paula Morris	Goaltender	0.900
4	(Australia) Olivia Last	Goaltender	0.900
5	(Australia) Ella Licari	Goaltender	0.892

Goals against average
No.	Name	Pos	GAA
1	(Australia) Paula Morris	Goaltender	1.33
2	(Turkey) Sera Dogramaci	Goaltender	2.20
3	(Australia) Jenelle Carson	Goaltender	2.71
4	(Australia) Olivia Last	Goaltender	2.84
5	(Australia) Ruth Brophy	Goaltender	3.00

=== Season awards ===
Below lists the 2018–19 AWIHL regular season award winners.

Award	Name	Team
Skaters Network Most Valuable Player	(Australia) Sharna Godfrey	Sydney Sirens
Best Forward	(Canada) Christina Julien	Melbourne Ice
Best Defence	(Australia) Amelia Matheson	Sydney Sirens
Best Goaltender	(Turkey) Sera Dogramaci	Sydney Sirens
Nellie Gee Rookie of the Year	(Australia) Olivia Last	Sydney Sirens

== Joan McKowen playoffs ==
The top four teams in the AWIHL regular season qualify for the Joan McKowen Memorial Trophy playoffs. The playoffs is held on a single weekend and uses Australian conventions of being called Finals. The playoff system used by the AWIHL is a four team single game semi-finals and grand final system where the semi-final winners progress to the grand final and the losers playoff for third place. Semi-finals are played on the Saturday and the third place playoff and grand final is played on the Sunday. The prize for being crowned AWIHL Champions for winning the grand final is the Joan McKowen Memorial Trophy.

In 2018–19, the Inferno, Sirens, Goannas and Ice qualified for the finals weekend. The event was held on 9 March to 10 March 2019 in host city Adelaide at the IceArenA. Sydney and Melbourne won the semi-finals on Saturday by comfortable margins to advance to the Joan McKowen grand final. On Sunday Perth defeated Brisbane in the third place playoff to finish their maiden season third with bronze medals. Melbourne beat Sydney to claim the championship title and lift the Joan McKowen Memorial Trophy for a record seventh time.

Semi-finals
9 March - Adelaide
Perth Inferno	3
Sydney Sirens	6
9 March - Adelaide
Brisbane Goannas	2
Melbourne Ice	9

Joan McKowen Final
10 March - Adelaide
Sydney Sirens	3
Melbourne Ice	4
Third place
10 March - Adelaide
Brisbane Goannas	3
Perth Inferno	6

=== Semi-finals ===
9 March 2019; 10:00	Perth Inferno	3–6 (1–2, 1–1, 1–3)	Sydney Sirens	IceArenA

Game reference

Keesha Atkins
Goalies
Sera Dogramaci
Referee:
Gabby Aston
Linesmen:
Mitch Brown
Sam Ellis

	0 – 1	McOnie (Unassisted)
	0 – 2	McOnie (Cochrane)
(Sharp) Scala	1 – 2
	1 – 3	Beaver (Chia, Embrey)
(C.Poole) M.Poole	2 – 3
	2 – 4	McOnie (Unassisted)
	2 – 5	Walker (Unassisted)
(Unassisted) Scala	3 – 5
	3 – 6	Godfrey (Matheson)

12 min
Penalties
8 min
40
Shots
43

9 March 2019; 16:00	Brisbane Goannas	2–9 (0–2, 2–5, 0–2)	Melbourne Ice	IceArenA; Attendance: 150

Game reference

Tina Girdler
Goalies
Ruth Brophy
Referee:
Dave Gal
Linesmen:
Ian Hunter
Josef Rezek

	0 – 1	Aparicio (Meyers)
	0 – 2	Aparicio (Meyers)
	0 – 3	Lo (Pullin)
	0 – 4	Julien (Unassisted)
	0 – 5	Pullin (Moore)
	0 – 6	van der Wolf (Diduszko)
(Hocutt) Roberts	1 – 6
(MacDonald) Roberts	2 – 6
	2 – 7	Julien (van der Wolf)
	2 – 8	Julien (Ellis)
	2 – 9	Carson (Ellis, Jones)

6 min
Penalties
12 min
15
Shots
40

=== Third place playoff ===
10 March 2019; 13:30	Brisbane Goannas	3–6 (0–2, 1–2, 2–2)	Perth Inferno	IceArenA

Game reference

Taylah Pearson
Goalies
Ella Licari
Referee:
Dave Gal
Linesmen:
Ian Hunter
Sam Ellis

	0 – 1	Cookson (Malcolm)
	0 – 2	Nottle (Minney-Smith)
	0 – 3	Clark-Crumpton (Moulton)
(Carbone) Roberts	1 – 3
	1 – 4	Clark-Crumpton (Moulton, Sharp)
	1 – 5	Clark-Crumpton (Moulton)
(Wytrykusz, Roberts) Carbone	2 – 5
(Haley) Brown	3 – 5
	3 – 6	McMahon (Clark-Crumpton)

6 min
Penalties
24 min
32
Shots
37

=== Final ===
10 March 2019; 18:00	Sydney Sirens	3–4 (1–2, 2–0, 0–2)	Melbourne Ice	IceArenA

Game reference

Sera Dogramaci
Goalies
Jenelle Carson
Referee:
Gabby Aston
Linesmen:
Josef Rezek
Mitch Brown

	0 – 1	Ellis (Meyers, Julien)
	0 – 2	Julien (Unassisted)
(Unassisted) Godfrey	1 – 2
(Unassisted) McOnie	2 – 2
(Matheson) Beaver	3 – 2
	3 – 3	Scheuerlein (Aparicio)
	3 – 4	Meyers (Unassisted)

16 min
Penalties
24 min
41
Shots
34

Gold	Silver	Bronze
(Victoria (state)) Melbourne Ice	(New South Wales) Sydney Sirens	(Western Australia) Perth Inferno
