= 2019–20 AWIHL season =

- League: Australian Women's Ice Hockey League
- Sport: Ice hockey
- Duration: 26 October 2019 – 2 February 2020

Regular season
- Premiers: Sydney Sirens
- Season MVP: Tash Farrier (Adelaide Rush)
- Top scorer: Kayla Nielsen (31 points) (Sydney Sirens)

Joan McKowen Memorial Trophy
- Champions: Sydney Sirens (2nd title)
- Runners-up: Adelaide Rush

AWIHL seasons
- 2018–19 2022–23

The 2019–20 AWIHL season is the thirteenth season of the Australian Women's Ice Hockey League (AWIHL). It ran from 26 October 2019 until 2 February 2020. Five teams competed in 30 regular season games followed by 4 playoff games, making up the AWIHL Finals weekend. The Sydney Sirens claimed the double by winning both the premiership title for finishing top of the regular season standings and the Joan McKowen Memorial Trophy championship title by winning the grand final. Adelaide Rush finished runner-up to both titles and the Brisbane Goannas claimed the wooden spoon.

== Teams ==
In 2019–20 the AWIHL had five teams from five Australian state capital cities competing, stretching east to west of the continent.

2019–20 AWIHL teams
| Team | City | Arena | Head Coach | Captain |
|---|---|---|---|---|
| Adelaide Rush | (South Australia) Adelaide | IceArenA | (Australia) Hayden Crafter | (Australia) Kirsty Venus |
| Brisbane Goannas | (Queensland) Brisbane | Boondall Iceworld | (Australia) Darryl Dunsford | (Australia) Jess Wytrykusz |
| Melbourne Ice | (Victoria (state)) Melbourne | O'Brien Icehouse | (Australia) Marcus Wong | (Canada) Christina Julien |
| Perth Inferno | (Western Australia) Perth | Cockburn Ice Arena | (Australia) Paul Graham | (United States) Courtney Moulton |
| Sydney Sirens | (New South Wales) Sydney | Liverpool Catholic Club Ice Rink | (Australia) Jayden Ryan | (Australia) Stephenie Cochrane |

== League Business ==
The official AWIHL gameday schedule was released at the end of September 2019. The season structure remained unchanged from 2018 to 2019, with each team playing two of the four opponents in a four-game series with the other two teams being played twice during the season. The AWIHL announced on 4 October a new travel partnership with SportsLink Travel, that would provide the five teams in the league a cost equalisation program for airfares and bus transfers. In November 2019, the league struck an agreement with Kayo Sports to stream a 'game of the week' and 20 minutes of highlights and player interviews for the 2019–20 season on Kayo's nationally available streaming service.

== Regular season ==
=== Fixtures & results ===
Running between 26 October 2019 and 19 January 2020, the AWIHL regular season consisted of 30 games in total. On 17 January 2020, the AWIHL commission decided to treat the 12 January 2020 game between Melbourne Ice and Perth Inferno as a draw and award both teams 1 point each. Initially the Inferno were awarded 2 points for winning in overtime, however the game did not progress to a shootout and a 3v3 overtime period was played instead, against league regulations.

==== October ====
October
| Game # | Date | Time | Away | Score | Home | Location | Recap |
|---|---|---|---|---|---|---|---|
| 1 | 26 October 2019 | 16:00 | Perth Inferno | 4–7 | Adelaide Rush | IceArenA |
| 2 | 27 October 2019 | 09:30 | Perth Inferno | 5–6 | Adelaide Rush | IceArenA |

==== November ====
November
| Game # | Date | Time | Away | Score | Home | Location | Recap |
|---|---|---|---|---|---|---|---|
| 3 | 2 November 2019 | 16:00 | Melbourne Ice | 3–1 | Brisbane Goannas | Boondall Iceworld |
| 4 | 2 November 2019 | 17:00 | Perth Inferno | 9–10 | Sydney Sirens | Liverpool Catholic Club Ice Rink |
| 5 | 3 November 2019 | 09:30 | Perth Inferno | 3–7 | Sydney Sirens | Liverpool Catholic Club Ice Rink |
| 6 | 3 November 2019 | 15:15 | Melbourne Ice | 1–3 | Brisbane Goannas | Boondall Iceworld |
| 7 | 9 November 2019 | 17:30 | Adelaide Rush | 7–5 | Perth Inferno | Cockburn Ice Arena |
| 8 | 10 November 2019 | 08:15 | Adelaide Rush | 4–3 | Perth Inferno | Cockburn Ice Arena |
| 9 | 16 November 2019 | 17:00 | Brisbane Goannas | 1–12 | Sydney Sirens | Liverpool Catholic Club Ice Rink |
| 10 | 17 November 2019 | 09:30 | Brisbane Goannas | 1–10 | Sydney Sirens | Liverpool Catholic Club Ice Rink |
| 11 | 23 November 2019 | 16:00 | Brisbane Goannas | 1–7 | Adelaide Rush | IceArenA |
| 12 | 23 November 2019 | 16:00 | Sydney Sirens | 3–2 | Melbourne Ice | O'Brien Icehouse |
| 13 | 24 November 2019 | 09:30 | Brisbane Goannas | 0–7 | Adelaide Rush | IceArenA |
| 14 | 24 November 2019 | 13:15 | Sydney Sirens | 3–1 | Melbourne Ice | O'Brien Icehouse |
| 15 | 30 November 2019 | 16:00 | Adelaide Rush | 2–0 | Brisbane Goannas | Boondall Iceworld |

==== December ====
December
| Game # | Date | Time | Away | Score | Home | Location | Recap |
|---|---|---|---|---|---|---|---|
| 16 | 1 December 2019 | 15:15 | Adelaide Rush | 6–2 | Brisbane Goannas | Boondall Iceworld |
| 17 | 7 December 2019 | 16:00 | Perth Inferno | 4–6 | Melbourne Ice | O'Brien Icehouse |
| 18 | 7 December 2019 | 16:00 | Sydney Sirens | 3–4 (SO) | Adelaide Rush | IceArenA |
| 19 | 8 December 2019 | 09:30 | Sydney Sirens | 6–5 (SO) | Adelaide Rush | IceArenA |
| 20 | 8 December 2019 | 13:15 | Perth Inferno | 4–7 | Melbourne Ice | O'Brien Icehouse |
| 21 | 14 December 2019 | 20:30 | Melbourne Ice | 3–4 (SO) | Sydney Sirens | Penrith Ice Palace |
| 22 | 15 December 2019 | 09:30 | Melbourne Ice | 7–5 | Sydney Sirens | Liverpool Catholic Club Ice Rink |

==== January ====
January
| Game # | Date | Time | Away | Score | Home | Location | Recap |
|---|---|---|---|---|---|---|---|
| 23 | 11 January 2020 | 16:00 | Sydney Sirens | 5–1 | Brisbane Goannas | Boondall Iceworld |
| 24 | 11 January 2020 | 18:00 | Melbourne Ice | 7–2 | Perth Inferno | Cockburn Ice Arena |
| 25 | 12 January 2020 | 12:30 | Melbourne Ice | 6–7 (OT) | Perth Inferno | Cockburn Ice Arena |
| 26 | 12 January 2020 | 15:15 | Sydney Sirens | 7–4 | Brisbane Goannas | Boondall Iceworld |
| 27 | 18 January 2020 | 16:00 | Adelaide Rush | 2–4 | Melbourne Ice | O'Brien Icehouse |
| 28 | 18 January 2020 | 18:00 | Brisbane Goannas | 1–4 | Perth Inferno | Cockburn Ice Arena |
| 29 | 19 January 2020 | 12:30 | Brisbane Goannas | 1–9 | Perth Inferno | Cockburn Ice Arena |
| 30 | 19 January 2020 | 13:15 | Adelaide Rush | 2–3 | Melbourne Ice | O'Brien Icehouse |

Key:

| Winner | Draw |

=== Standings ===
| Pos | Team | Pld | W | OTW | D | OTL | L | GF | GA | GD | Pts | Qualification or relegation |
|---|---|---|---|---|---|---|---|---|---|---|---|---|
| 1 | Sydney Sirens (C) | 12 | 8 | 2 | 0 | 1 | 1 | 75 | 41 | +34 | 29 | 2020 Joan McKowen Finals |
| 2 | Adelaide Rush | 12 | 8 | 1 | 0 | 1 | 2 | 59 | 36 | +23 | 27 | 2020 Joan McKowen Finals |
| 3 | Melbourne Ice | 12 | 7 | 0 | 1 | 1 | 3 | 50 | 39 | +11 | 23 | 2020 Joan McKowen Finals |
| 4 | Perth Inferno | 12 | 2 | 0 | 1 | 0 | 9 | 58 | 69 | −11 | 7 | 2020 Joan McKowen Finals |
| 5 | Brisbane Goannas | 12 | 1 | 0 | 0 | 0 | 11 | 16 | 73 | −57 | 3 | |

Source: AWIHL Elite Prospects
Rules for classification:
Tie-break: 1) points; 2) goal difference; 3) number of goals scored
Points: 3 points for regulation win; 2 points for OT or SO win; 1 point for OT or SO loss or tie/draw; 0 points for regulation loss
(C) Champion

=== Player stats ===
The season's league leader statistics for skaters and goaltenders.

Goals
| No. | Name | Pos | G |
|---|---|---|---|
| 1 | (United States) Kayla Nielsen | Forward | 17 |
| 2 | (Canada) Nadine Edney | Forward | 17 |
| 3 | (Australia) Natasha Farrier | Forward | 16 |
| 4 | (United States) Nora Maclaine | Forward | 13 |
| 5 | (Canada) Christina Julien | Forward | 12 |

Assists
| No. | Name | Pos | A |
|---|---|---|---|
| 1 | (United States) Kayla Nielsen | Forward | 14 |
| 2 | (Canada) Nadine Edney | Forward | 13 |
| 3 | (Australia) Natasha Farrier | Forward | 12 |
| 4 | (Australia) Sharna Godfrey | Forward | 12 |
| 5 | (Australia) Michelle Clark-Crumpton | Forward | 11 |

Points
| No. | Name | Pos | P |
|---|---|---|---|
| 1 | (United States) Kayla Nielsen | Forward | 31 |
| 2 | (Canada) Nadine Edney | Forward | 30 |
| 3 | (Australia) Natasha Farrier | Forward | 28 |
| 4 | (United States) Nora Maclaine | Forward | 23 |
| 5 | (Australia) Sharna Godfrey | Forward | 22 |

Penalty minutes
| No. | Name | Pos | PIM |
|---|---|---|---|
| 1 | (Australia) Tracy Hocutt | Forward | 40 |
| 2 | (Canada) Sarah Dash | Defender | 37 |
| 3 | (Australia) Nicole Jones | Forward | 36 |
| 4 | (Australia) Rylie Ellis | Defender | 34 |
| 5 | (United States) Courtney Moulton | Forward | 30 |

Save percentage
| No. | Name | Pos | SV% |
|---|---|---|---|
| 1 | (Australia) Tina Girdler | Goaltender | 0.915 |
| 2 | (Australia) Makayla Peers | Goaltender | 0.911 |
| 3 | (Australia) Jenelle Carson | Goaltender | 0.893 |
| 4 | (Australia) Sasha King | Goaltender | 0.882 |
| 5 | (Australia) Michelle Coonan | Goaltender | 0.881 |

Goals against average
| No. | Name | Pos | GAA |
|---|---|---|---|
| 1 | (Australia) Tina Girdler | Goaltender | 2.20 |
| 2 | (Australia) Makayla Peers | Goaltender | 2.33 |
| 3 | (Australia) Joanne Phillis | Goaltender | 2.57 |
| 4 | (Australia) Michelle Coonan | Goaltender | 3.05 |
| 5 | (Australia) Jenelle Carson | Goaltender | 3.13 |

=== Season awards ===
Below lists the 2019–20 AWIHL regular season award winners.

| Award | Name | Team |
|---|---|---|
| Skaters Network Most Valuable Player | (Australia) Natasha Farrier | Adelaide Rush |
| Best Forward | (United States) Kayla Nielsen | Sydney Sirens |
| Best Defence | (Canada) Sarah Edney | Sydney Sirens |
| Best Goaltender | (Australia) Michelle Coonan | Adelaide Rush |
| Nellie Gee Rookie of the Year | (Australia) Courtney Mahoney | Brisbane Goannas |

== Joan McKowen playoffs ==
The top four teams in the AWIHL regular season qualify for the Joan McKowen Memorial Trophy playoffs. The playoffs is held on a single weekend and uses Australian conventions of being called Finals. The playoff system used by the AWIHL is a four team single game semi-finals and grand final system where the semi-final winners progress to the grand final and the losers playoff for third place. Semi-finals are played on the Saturday and the third place and grand final is played on the Sunday. The prize for being crowned AWIHL Champions for winning the grand final is the Joan McKowen Memorial Trophy.

In 2019–20, the Sirens, Rush, Ice and Inferno qualified for the finals weekend. In late January 2020, the AWIHL released an annual finals promo video to promote the event as well as naming the officials for the weekend. The event was held on 1 and 2 February 2020 in host city Melbourne at O’Brien Icehouse. Sydney and Adelaide won on Saturday to advance to the Joan McKowen Final, with Perth and Melbourne heading to the third place playoff. Melbourne Ice won playoff on Sunday to secure third place for the season, Perth finishing fourth. In the grand final, Sydney Sirens produced a strong display to shutout the Rush and secure the Championship title and the Joan McKowen Memorial Trophy. It is the second championship title in Sirens history.

Semi-finals
1 February - Melbourne
Perth Inferno | 8
Sydney Sirens | 14
1 February - Melbourne
Melbourne Ice | 2
Adelaide Rush | 4

Joan McKowen Final
2 February - Melbourne
Adelaide Rush | 0
Sydney Sirens | 3
Third place
2 February - Melbourne
Perth Inferno | 3
Melbourne Ice | 4

=== Semi-finals ===
| 1 February 2020; 15:00 | Perth Inferno | 8–14 (3–6, 3–6, 2–2) | Sydney Sirens | O’Brien Icehouse |

Game reference

Sydney Fricker
Goalies
Tina Girdler
Referees:
Grainge Phillips
Casper Russelhuber
Linesmen:
Cien Pereira
Rob Lowery

| | 0 – 1 | S.Edney (N.Edney) |
| (Moulton) Maclaine | 1 – 1 |
| | 1 – 2 | Nielsen (N.Edney) |
| | 1 – 3 | Nielsen (Matheson, N.Edney) |
| (Clark-Crumpton, Sharp) Scala | 2 – 3 |
| | 2 – 4 | Brunt (Matheson, Godfrey) |
| | 2 – 5 | Godfrey (Unassisted) |
| (Unassisted) Moulton | 3 – 5 |
| | 3 – 6 | S.Edney (N.Edney) |
| (Moulton, Malcolm) Maclaine | 4 – 6 |
| | 4 – 7 | Godfrey (Matheson) |
| | 4 – 8 | N.Edney (S.Edney, Chia) |
| | 4 – 9 | Godfrey (S.Edney) |
| | 4 – 10 | Badaoui (Calabria) |
| (Maclaine) Moulton | 5 – 10 |
| | 5 – 11 | Nielsen (Chia) |
| | 5 – 12 | S.Edney (Godfrey) |
| (Maclaine, Moulton) Malcolm | 6 – 12 |
| (Maclaine) Clark-Crumpton | 7 – 12 |
| (Maclaine) Scala | 8 – 12 |
| | 8 – 13 | N.Edney (Godfrey, Matheson) |
| | 8 – 14 | Badaoui (Unassisted) |

14 min
Penalties
12 min
39
Shots
55

| 1 February 2020; 17:30 | Melbourne Ice | 2–4 (1–0, 1–1, 0–3) | Adelaide Rush | O’Brien Icehouse |

Game reference

Jenelle Carson
Goalies
Michelle Coonan
Referees:
Gabby Aston
Nick Air
Linesmen:
Beth Bowshall
Hamish Young

| (Unassisted) Ellis | 1 – 0 |
| (Aparicio, Moore) Julien | 2 – 0 |
| | 2 – 1 | Lutz (Farrier) |
| | 2 – 2 | Farrier (Lutz) |
| | 2 – 3 | Lutz (Farrier, Ayris) |
| | 2 – 4 | Farrier (Lutz) |

16 min
Penalties
18 min
28
Shots
28

=== Third place playoff ===
| 2 February 2020; 15:00 | Perth Inferno | 3–4 (1–0, 1–3, 1–1) | Melbourne Ice | O’Brien Icehouse |

Game reference

Sasha King
Goalies
Makayla Peers
Referees:
Grainge Phillips
Nick Air
Linesmen:
Rob Lowery
Hamish Young

| (Unassisted) Maclaine | 1 – 0 |
| | 1 – 1 | Julien (Aparicio) |
| | 1 – 2 | Gallacher (Green, Pullin) |
| (Unassisted) Sharp | 2 – 2 |
| | 2 – 3 | Pullin (Unassisted) |
| | 2 – 4 | Aparicio (Julien) |
| (Scala, Moulton) Maclaine | 3 – 4 |

8 min
Penalties
20 min
28
Shots
43

=== Final ===
| 2 February 2020; 17:30 | Adelaide Rush | 0–3 (0–2, 0–0, 0–1) | Sydney Sirens | O’Brien Icehouse |

Game reference

Michelle Coonan
Goalies
Tina Girdler
Referees:
Gabby Aston
Casper Russelhuber
Linesmen:
Beth Bowshall
Cien Pereira

| 0 – 1 | Cochrane (Godfrey, S.Edney) |
| 0 – 2 | Matheson (Calabria, Walker) |
| 0 – 3 | S.Edney (Godfrey) |

16 min
Penalties
12 min
23
Shots
32

| Gold | Silver | Bronze |
|---|---|---|
| (New South Wales) Sydney Sirens | (South Australia) Adelaide Rush | (Victoria (state)) Melbourne Ice |
