= 2023–24 AWIHL season =

- League: AWIHL
- Sport: Ice hockey
- Duration: 28 October 2023 – 10 March 2024

Regular season
- Premiers: Perth Inferno (1st title)
- Top scorer: Michelle Clark-Crumpton (38 points) (Inferno)

Joan McKowen Memorial Trophy
- Champions: Melbourne Ice (8th title)
- Runners-up: Perth Inferno
- Finals MVP: Danielle Butler (Ice)

AWIHL seasons
- 2022–23 2024–25

The 2023–24 AWIHL season is the 15th season of the Australian Women's Ice Hockey League (AWIHL). It ran from 28 October 2023 until 10 March 2024. Five teams competed in 40 regular season games followed by 4 playoff games, making up the AWIHL Finals weekend. The Perth Inferno claimed the Gower Memorial Shield premiership title, their maiden title, for finishing top of the regular season standings. The Melbourne Ice claimed their eighth Joan McKowen Memorial Trophy championship title by winning the grand final. Perth Inferno collected silver with Adelaide Rush claimed bronze. Defending champions, the Sydney Sirens, claimed the wooden spoon.

== Teams ==
In 2023–24 the AWIHL had five teams from five Australian state capital cities competing, stretching east to west of the continent.

2023–24 AWIHL teams
| Team | City | Arena | Head Coach | Captain |
|---|---|---|---|---|
| Adelaide Rush | (South Australia) Adelaide | IceArenA | (Canada) Joey MacDougall | (Australia) Natasha Farrier |
| Brisbane Lightning | (Queensland) Brisbane | Boondall Iceworld | (Australia) Matthew Meyer | (Canada) Christina Badgley |
| Melbourne Ice | (Victoria (state)) Melbourne | O'Brien Icehouse | (Australia) Curtis Klooster | (Australia) Georgia Moore |
| Perth Inferno | (Western Australia) Perth | Cockburn Ice Arena | (Australia) Graham Hyde | (United States) Chrystina Acker |
| Sydney Sirens | (New South Wales) Sydney | Macquarie Ice Rink | (Australia) Gabriel Robledo | (Canada) Sarah Edney |
Exhibition teams
| Melbourne Ducks | (Victoria (state)) Melbourne | IceHQ | (Australia) Jeremy Muir | (Australia) Lucy Parrington |

== League Business ==
Ahead of the 2023–24 season, IceHQ's Melbourne Ducks announced their bid to join the AWIHL. The official AWIHL gameday schedule was released in early September 2023. The season structure was amended from 2022 to 2023, with each team now playing eight home and eight away games for a total of sixteen games over the regular season. An increase from the previous six home and away games. The trophy for the Premiership, winners of the regular season, was also amended in 2023. The Gower Memorial Shield replaced the previous Premiers trophy, the Stephanie Boxall Trophy. In late September, the AWIHL broadcast partner, Clutch.TV, went into administration and ceased all operations. The league was left little time to look for a new broadcaster for season 2023–24. On 24 October, the AWIHL announced a deal with Sportscast Australia to become the league's new broadcast partner for season 2023–24. A few days later the AWIHL and Sportscast Australia launched AWIHL.TV to deliver region-unlocked live and on-demand streaming of all regular season and finals games on a custom built website and YouTube. In January 2024, the AWIHL announced player equipment rule changes and a new equipment supplier agreement with Skaters Network. Neck laceration protective equipment was made mandatory, bringing the league into policy alignment with Ice Hockey Australia (IHA) and the International Ice Hockey Federation (IIHF). The deal with Skaters network, also covers sponsorship of player of the month and end of season player awards.

=== Exhibition games ===
To support the Melbourne Ducks application to join the league, the AWIHL approved the team to setup an exhibition series against existing AWIHL teams, including the Sydney Sirens, Melbourne Ice and Adelaide Rush, during season 2023–24. The Sydney Sirens also arranged a pre-season exhibition against a select team from their sponsor Wayward Brewing Company

2023-24 AWIHL exhibition games
| Date | Time | Away | Score | Home | Location | Recap |
|---|---|---|---|---|---|---|
| 14 October 2023 | 16:30 | Wayward Sons | 1–3 | Sydney Sirens | Macquarie Ice Rink | Ref |
| 20 October 2023 | 19:00 | Melbourne Ice | 15–0 | Melbourne Ducks | iceHQ | Ref |
| 21 October 2023 | 18:30 | Melbourne Ice | 14–0 | Melbourne Ducks | iceHQ | Ref |
| 9 December 2023 | 19:30 | Sydney Sirens | 14–4 | Melbourne Ducks | iceHQ | Ref |
| 10 December 2023 | 16:00 | Sydney Sirens | 1–2 | Melbourne Ducks | iceHQ | Ref |
| 3 February 2024 | 19:30 | Adelaide Rush | 12–1 | Melbourne Ducks | iceHQ | Ref |
| 4 February 2024 | 15:00 | Adelaide Rush | 9–1 | Melbourne Ducks | iceHQ | Ref |

== Regular season ==
=== Fixtures & results ===
Running between 28 October 2023 and 25 February 2024, the AWIHL regular season consisted of 40 games in total, with teams playing 16 games each. Game 34 of the regular season was first postponed and then cancelled by the AWIHL following a carbon monoxide poisoning incident at Adelaide's IceArenA. At least 42 people, including players from both AWIHL teams, were treated for poisoning with dozens hospitalised by the incident. The LPG gas-powered Zamboni was identified as the source of the leak that led to the poisoning. The game was declared a tie with each team awarded one point each.

==== October ====
October
| Game # | Date | Time | Away | Score | Home | Location | Recap |
|---|---|---|---|---|---|---|---|
| 1 | 28 October 2023 | 16:30 | Melbourne Ice | 6–5 | Sydney Sirens | Macquarie Ice Rink |
| 2 | 28 October 2023 | 17:00 | Adelaide Rush | 6–5 (OT) | Brisbane Lightning | Boondall Iceworld |
| 3 | 29 October 2023 | 08:15 | Melbourne Ice | 6–3 | Sydney Sirens | Macquarie Ice Rink |
| 4 | 29 October 2023 | 15:30 | Adelaide Rush | 2–6 | Brisbane Lightning | Boondall Iceworld |

==== November ====
November
| Game # | Date | Time | Away | Score | Home | Location | Recap |
|---|---|---|---|---|---|---|---|
| 5 | 4 November 2023 | 16:00 | Perth Inferno | 5–4 | Melbourne Ice | iceHQ |
| 6 | 5 November 2023 | 14:30 | Perth Inferno | 1–6 | Melbourne Ice | iceHQ |
| 7 | 11 November 2023 | 13:45 | Sydney Sirens | 4–5 | Adelaide Rush | IceArenA |
| 8 | 11 November 2023 | 20:00 | Melbourne Ice | 9–5 | Brisbane Lightning | Boondall Iceworld |
| 9 | 12 November 2023 | 10:00 | Sydney Sirens | 4–6 | Adelaide Rush | IceArenA |
| 10 | 12 November 2023 | 15:30 | Melbourne Ice | 5–7 | Brisbane Lightning | Boondall Iceworld |

==== December ====
December
| Game # | Date | Time | Away | Score | Home | Location | Recap |
|---|---|---|---|---|---|---|---|
| 11 | 2 December 2023 | 16:30 | Adelaide Rush | 3–2 | Sydney Sirens | Macquarie Ice Rink |
| 12 | 2 December 2023 | 17:00 | Perth Inferno | 9–0 | Brisbane Lightning | Boondall Iceworld |
| 13 | 3 December 2023 | 08:15 | Adelaide Rush | 7–1 | Sydney Sirens | Macquarie Ice Rink |
| 14 | 3 December 2023 | 15:30 | Perth Inferno | 4–3 (OT) | Brisbane Lightning | Boondall Iceworld |
| 15 | 9 December 2023 | 16:30 | Brisbane Lightning | 0–1 | Perth Inferno | Cockburn Ice Arena |
| 16 | 10 December 2023 | 10:30 | Brisbane Lightning | 7–4 | Perth Inferno | Cockburn Ice Arena |
| 17 | 16 December 2023 | 16:00 | Perth Inferno | 7–4 | Adelaide Rush | IceArenA |
| 18 | 16 December 2023 | 16:45 | Sydney Sirens | 6–8 | Melbourne Ice | Macquarie Ice Rink |
| 19 | 17 December 2023 | 10:00 | Perth Inferno | 9–8 | Adelaide Rush | IceArenA |
| 20 | 17 December 2023 | 13:45 | Sydney Sirens | 2–7 | Melbourne Ice | Macquarie Ice Rink |

==== January ====
January
| Game # | Date | Time | Away | Score | Home | Location | Recap |
|---|---|---|---|---|---|---|---|
| 21 | 13 January 2024 | 16:30 | Melbourne Ice | 4–5 (SO) | Perth Inferno | Cockburn Ice Arena |
| 22 | 14 January 2024 | 10:30 | Melbourne Ice | 6–3 | Perth Inferno | Cockburn Ice Arena |
| 23 | 20 January 2024 | 16:00 | Brisbane Lightning | 5–8 | Adelaide Rush | IceArenA |
| 24 | 21 January 2024 | 10:00 | Brisbane Lightning | 2–6 | Adelaide Rush | IceArenA |
| 25 | 27 January 2024 | 16:30 | Sydney Sirens | 5–7 | Perth Inferno | Cockburn Ice Arena |
| 26 | 27 January 2024 | 16:45 | Adelaide Rush | 2–3 | Melbourne Ice | O’Brien Icehouse |
| 27 | 28 January 2024 | 10:30 | Sydney Sirens | 5–4 | Perth Inferno | Cockburn Ice Arena |
| 28 | 28 January 2024 | 13:45 | Adelaide Rush | 5–2 | Melbourne Ice | O’Brien Icehouse |

==== February ====
February
| Game # | Date | Time | Away | Score | Home | Location | Recap |
|---|---|---|---|---|---|---|---|
| 29 | 3 February 2024 | 17:00 | Sydney Sirens | 1–5 | Brisbane Lightning | Boondall Iceworld |
| 30 | 4 February 2024 | 15:30 | Sydney Sirens | 2–7 | Brisbane Lightning | Boondall Iceworld |
| 31 | 10 February 2024 | 16:00 | Melbourne Ice | 2–6 | Adelaide Rush | IceArenA |
| 32 | 10 February 2024 | 16:30 | Brisbane Lightning | 3–4 | Sydney Sirens | Macquarie Ice Rink |
| 33 | 11 February 2024 | 08:15 | Brisbane Lightning | 2–3 (SO) | Sydney Sirens | Macquarie Ice Rink |
| 34 | 11 February 2024 | 10:00 | Melbourne Ice | Cancelled | Adelaide Rush | IceArenA |
| 35 | 17 February 2024 | 16:30 | Perth Inferno | 3–0 | Sydney Sirens | Macquarie Ice Rink |
| 36 | 18 February 2024 | 08:15 | Perth Inferno | 2–4 | Sydney Sirens | Macquarie Ice Rink |
| 37 | 24 February 2024 | 16:30 | Adelaide Rush | 3–5 | Perth Inferno | Cockburn Ice Arena |
| 38 | 24 February 2024 | 16:45 | Brisbane Lightning | 8–4 | Melbourne Ice | O’Brien Icehouse |
| 39 | 25 February 2024 | 10:30 | Adelaide Rush | 2–3 | Perth Inferno | Cockburn Ice Arena |
| 40 | 25 February 2024 | 13:45 | Brisbane Lightning | 5–3 | Melbourne Ice | O’Brien Icehouse |

Key:

| Winner | Draw |

=== Standings ===
| Pos | Team | Pld | W | OTW | D | OTL | L | GF | GA | GD | Pts | Qualification or relegation |
|---|---|---|---|---|---|---|---|---|---|---|---|---|
| 1 | Perth Inferno | 16 | 9 | 2 | 0 | 0 | 5 | 72 | 61 | +11 | 31 | 2024 Joan McKowen Finals |
| 2 | Adelaide Rush | 16 | 8 | 1 | 1 | 0 | 6 | 74 | 61 | +13 | 27 | 2024 Joan McKowen Finals |
| 3 | Melbourne Ice | 16 | 8 | 0 | 1 | 1 | 6 | 76 | 69 | +7 | 26 | 2024 Joan McKowen Finals |
| 4 | Brisbane Lightning | 16 | 7 | 0 | 0 | 3 | 6 | 70 | 71 | −1 | 24 | 2024 Joan McKowen Finals |
| 5 | Sydney Sirens | 16 | 3 | 1 | 0 | 0 | 12 | 51 | 81 | −30 | 11 | |

Source: AWIHL Elite Prospects
Rules for classification:
Tie-break: 1) points; 2) goal difference; 3) number of goals scored
Points: 3 points for regulation win; 2 points for OT or SO win; 1 point for OT or SO loss or tie/draw; 0 points for regulation loss

=== Player stats ===
The season's league leader statistics for skaters and goaltenders.

Goals
| No. | Name | Pos | G |
|---|---|---|---|
| 1 | (United States) Elizabeth Scala | Forward | 22 |
| 2 | (Canada) Sarah Edney | Forward | 22 |
| 3 | (United States) Emma Wuthrich | Forward | 15 |
| 4 | (Australia) Sharna Godfrey | Forward | 14 |
| 5 | (Canada) Danielle Butler | Forward | 14 |

Assists
| No. | Name | Pos | A |
|---|---|---|---|
| 1 | (Australia) Michelle Clark-Crumpton | Forward | 27 |
| 2 | (Australia) Sara Sammons | Forward | 24 |
| 3 | (Australia) Ashlie Aparicio | Forward | 23 |
| 4 | (Australia) Sharna Godfrey | Forward | 17 |
| 5 | (Australia) Kaitlyn Malthaner | Forward | 15 |

Points
| No. | Name | Pos | P |
|---|---|---|---|
| 1 | (Australia) Michelle Clark-Crumpton | Forward | 38 |
| 2 | (Australia) Sara Sammons | Forward | 33 |
| 3 | (Australia) Sharna Godfrey | Forward | 31 |
| 4 | (Australia) Ashlie Aparicio | Forward | 31 |
| 5 | (United States) Elizabeth Scala | Forward | 29 |

Penalty minutes
| No. | Name | Pos | PIM |
|---|---|---|---|
| 1 | (Canada) Maya Tupper | Defender | 41 |
| 2 | (United States) Emma Wuthrich | Forward | 39 |
| 3 | (Australia) Samantha Brophy | Defender | 37 |
| 4 | (Australia) Molly Lukowiak | Forward | 26 |
| 5 | (Australia) Gabrielle Arps | Defender | 26 |

Save percentage
| No. | Name | Pos | SV% |
|---|---|---|---|
| 1 | (Australia) Sasha King | Goaltender | .923 |
| 2 | (Australia) Madison Smith | Goaltender | .888 |
| 3 | (Australia) Emma Moonen | Goaltender | .875 |
| 4 | (Australia) Katie Meyer | Goaltender | .868 |
| 5 | (Australia) Makayla Peers | Goaltender | .859 |

Goals against average
| No. | Name | Pos | GAA |
|---|---|---|---|
| 1 | (Australia) Sasha King | Goaltender | 2.86 |
| 2 | (Australia) Katie Meyer | Goaltender | 3.23 |
| 3 | (Australia) Madison Smith | Goaltender | 3.40 |
| 4 | (Australia) Emma Moonen | Goaltender | 3.85 |
| 5 | (Australia) Amelia Knott | Goaltender | 4.60 |

=== Season awards ===
Below lists the 2023–24 AWIHL regular season league award winners.

| Award | Name | Team |
|---|---|---|
| Best Forward | (Canada) Sarah Edney | Sydney Sirens |
| Best Defence | (Canada) Maya Tupper | Adelaide Rush |
| Best Goaltender | (Australia) Sasha King | Perth Inferno |
| Nellie Gee Rookie of the Year | (Australia) Katie Meyer | Brisbane Lightning |

Below lists the 2023–24 AWIHL regular season Hockey Hype Australia award winners.

| Award | Name | Team |
|---|---|---|
| Assist of the season | (Australia) Natalie Ayris | Adelaide Rush |
| Goal of the season | (Australia) Sara Sammons | Perth Inferno |
| Save of the season | (Australia) Archie Smith | Adelaide Rush |

== Joan McKowen playoffs ==
The top four teams in the AWIHL regular season qualify for the Joan McKowen Memorial Trophy playoffs. The playoffs is held on a single weekend and uses Australian conventions of being called Finals. The playoff system used by the AWIHL is a four team single game semi-finals and grand final system where the semi-final winners progress to the grand final and the losers playoff for third place. Semi-finals are played on the Saturday and the third place playoff and grand final is played on the Sunday. The prize for being crowned AWIHL Champions for winning the grand final is the Joan McKowen Memorial Trophy.

In 2023–24, the Inferno, Rush, Ice and Lightning qualified for the finals weekend. The event was held on the weekend of 9–10 March 2024 in host city Melbourne at O’Brien Icehouse. Perth and Melbourne won the semi-final games on Saturday to progress to the grand final on Sunday. The defeated teams, Adelaide and Brisbane, progressed to the bronze medal game on Sunday. In the third-place play-off, the Adelaide Rush defeated the Brisbane Lightning to clinch the bronze medal. In the grand final, the regular season Premiers were defeated in an upset to the Melbourne Ice. The surprise victory for the Ice saw them hoist the Joan McKowen Memorial Trophy for a record setting eighth time. After the grand final, Danielle Butler, of the Melbourne Ice, was named AWIHL Finals MVP.

Semi-finals
9 March - Melbourne
Brisbane Lightning | 1
Perth Inferno | 3
9 March - Melbourne
Melbourne Ice | 5
Adelaide Rush | 2

Joan McKowen Final
10 March - Melbourne
Melbourne Ice | 4
Perth Inferno | 1
Third place
10 March - Melbourne
Adelaide Rush | 4
Brisbane Lightning | 2

=== Semi-finals ===
| 9 March 2024; 14:30 | Brisbane Lightning | 1–3 (1–0, 0–1, 0–2) | Perth Inferno | O’Brien Icehouse |

Game reference

(Australia) Katie Meyer
Goalies
(Australia) Sasha King
Referee:
Gabby Aston
Linesmen:
Beth Bowshall
Davida Paul

| (Unassisted) S.Crompton | 1–0 |
| | 1–1 | G.Mclellan (Unassisted) |
| | 1–2 | M.Lukowiak (M.Clark-Crumpton, G.Mclellan) |
| | 1–3 | S.Sammons (M.Clark-Crumpton, S.Irvine) |

8 min
Penalties
14 min
48
Shots
27

| 9 March 2024; 17:15 | Melbourne Ice | 5–2 (3–0, 1–2, 1–0) | Adelaide Rush | O’Brien Icehouse |

Game reference

(Australia) Jenelle Carson
Goalies
(Australia) Madison Smith
Referee:
Ainslie Gardner
Linesmen:
Sarah Kinninment
Cien Pereira

| (M.Pullin) B.Arsenault-Dufour | 1–0 |
| (A.Aparicio) S.Conlon | 2–0 |
| (S.Godfrey) S.Conlon | 3–0 |
| (S.Godfrey) D.Butler | 4–0 |
| | 4–1 | K.Malthaner (N.Ayris) |
| | 4–2 | N.Farrier (K.Venus, R.Pietrowski) |
| (Unassisted) D.Butler | 5–2 |

8 min
Penalties
10 min
31
Shots
40

=== Third place playoff ===
| 10 March 2024; 14:00 | Adelaide Rush | 4–2 (1–0, 2–2, 1–0) | Brisbane Lightning | O’Brien Icehouse |

Game reference

(Australia) Madison Smith
Goalies
(Australia) Tracey McIntosh
Referee:
Gabby Aston
Linesmen:
Cien Pereira
Davida Paul

| (K.Venus) R.Pietrowski | 1–0 |
| (Unassisted) K.Malthaner | 2–0 |
| | 2–1 | L.Kiliwnik (Unassisted) |
| | 2–2 | C.Mahoney (K.Rapchuk) |
| (Unassisted) S.Meroniuk | 3–2 |
| (R.Pietrowski) K.Venus | 4–2 |

18 min
Penalties
18 min
34
Shots
36

=== Final ===
| 10 March 2024; 17:00 | Melbourne Ice | 4–1 (1–0, 2–0, 1–1) | Perth Inferno | O’Brien Icehouse |

Game reference

(Australia) Jenelle Carson
Goalies
(Australia) Sasha King
Referee:
Ainslie Gardner
Linesmen:
Beth Bowshall
Sarah Kinninment

| (D.Butler) S.Conlon | 1–0 |
| (B.Arsenault-Dufour) D.Butler | 2–0 |
| (S.Conlon) D.Butler | 3–0 |
| (T.Baker) M.Pullin | 4–0 |
| | 4–1 | E.Scala (S.Sammons) |

8 min
Penalties
6 min
39
Shots
30

| Gold | Silver | Bronze |
|---|---|---|
| (Victoria (state)) Melbourne Ice | (Western Australia) Perth Inferno | (South Australia) Adelaide Rush |
