= 2022–23 AWIHL season =

- League: Australian Women's Ice Hockey League
- Sport: Ice hockey
- Duration: 5 November 2022 – 19 March 2023

Regular season
- Premiers: Melbourne Ice
- Top scorer: Elizabeth Scala (28 points) (Perth Inferno)

Joan McKowen Memorial Trophy
- Champions: Sydney Sirens (3rd title)
- Runners-up: Melbourne Ice

AWIHL seasons
- 2019–20 2023–24

The 2022–23 AWIHL season is the 14th season of the Australian Women's Ice Hockey League (AWIHL). It runs from 5 November 2022 until 19 March 2023. Five teams compete in 30 regular season games followed by 4 playoff games, making up the AWIHL Finals weekend. The Sydney Sirens claimed the Joan McKowen Memorial Trophy championship title by winning the grand final. The Melbourne Ice claimed the Stephanie Boxall Trophy premiership title for finishing top of the regular season standings. The Sirens finished runner-up in the regular season and the Adelaide Rush claimed the wooden spoon.

== Teams ==
In 2022–23 the AWIHL had five teams from five Australian state capital cities competing, stretching east to west of the continent.

2022–23 AWIHL teams
Team	City	Arena	Head coach	Captain
Adelaide Rush	(South Australia) Adelaide	IceArenA	(Canada) Joey MacDougall	(Australia) Natalie Ayris
Brisbane Lightning	(Queensland) Brisbane	Boondall Iceworld	(Australia) Tom Harkness	(Australia) Kelly Costa
Melbourne Ice	(Victoria (state)) Melbourne	O'Brien Icehouse	(Australia) Rod Johns & Andrew Marshall	(Canada) Sarah Dash
Perth Inferno	(Western Australia) Perth	Cockburn Ice Arena	(Australia) Graham Hyde	(Australia) Marina Nottle
Sydney Sirens	(New South Wales) Sydney	Macquarie Ice Rink	(Australia) Jayden Ryan	(Canada) Sarah Edney

== League Business ==
The official AWIHL gameday schedule was released at the beginning of October 2022. The season structure remained unchanged from 2019 to 2020, with each team playing two of the four opponents in a four-game series with the other two teams being played twice during the season. Ahead of the new season, after a two-year absence due to COVID-19 outbreaks and subsequent lockdown and travel restrictions, AWIHL Commissioner, Melissa Rulli, stepped down from her role. She held the position for almost five years, having secured the position in December 2017. The Brisbane Goannas announced they had signed and agreement with the Brisbane Lightning organisation to merge their organisations. The Goannas would re-brand themselves as the Lightning for the season ahead. At the end of October, the league and Cluch signed a broadcasting deal for every game of the season to be broadcast live and free on Cluch's streaming platform. The streams would be available worldwide, with no region locking. In January, Perth Inferno released a special one-off Cancer Awareness jersey that will be worn in a game on 4 February 2023 and then auctioned off post-game to support Cancer Council Western Australia.

Staffing changes for 2022-23 included Brisbane naming Tom Harkness as their new head coach, with Matt Meyer and Ben Stadtmiller to assist him. Adelaide appointed Joey MacDougall as their new head coach and the vastly experienced Jim Fuyarchuk as assistant coach. Melbourne Ice changed their coaching lineup for 2022–23. Rod Johns, Bryan Mackenzie and Andrew Marshall were appointed team coaches, replacing Marcus Wong, Mark Smith and Laurie Piggot.

== Regular season ==
=== Fixtures & results ===
Running between 5 November 2022 and 5 March 2023, the AWIHL regular season consisted of 30 games in total, with teams playing 12 games each.

==== November ====
November
Game #	Date	Time	Away	Score	Home	Location	Recap
1	5 November 2022	16:30	Brisbane Lightning	3–8	Sydney Sirens	Macquarie Ice Rink
2	6 November 2022	08:15	Brisbane Lightning	4–5	Sydney Sirens	Macquarie Ice Rink
3	12 November 2022	16:00	Melbourne Ice	7–2	Adelaide Rush	IceArenA
4	12 November 2022	17:00	Perth Inferno	2–3	Brisbane Lightning	Boondall Iceworld
5	13 November 2022	10:00	Melbourne Ice	7–0	Adelaide Rush	IceArenA
6	13 November 2022	16:30	Perth Inferno	4–2	Brisbane Lightning	Boondall Iceworld
7	19 November 2022	16:30	Sydney Sirens	9–6	Perth Inferno	Cockburn Ice Arena
8	20 November 2022	10:00	Sydney Sirens	6–5 (OT)	Perth Inferno	Cockburn Ice Arena
9	26 November 2022	16:30	Adelaide Rush	0–9	Sydney Sirens	Macquarie Ice Rink
10	27 November 2022	08:15	Adelaide Rush	1–3	Sydney Sirens	Macquarie Ice Rink

==== December ====
December
Game #	Date	Time	Away	Score	Home	Location	Recap
11	3 December 2022	17:00	Adelaide Rush	1–4	Melbourne Ice	O'Brien Icehouse
12	4 December 2022	13:30	Adelaide Rush	3–4	Melbourne Ice	O'Brien Icehouse
13	17 December 2022	17:00	Brisbane Lightning	0–2	Melbourne Ice	O'Brien Icehouse
14	18 December 2022	13:30	Brisbane Lightning	1–7	Melbourne Ice	O'Brien Icehouse

==== January ====
January
Game #	Date	Time	Away	Score	Home	Location	Recap
15	7 January 2002	16:00	Perth Inferno	3–5	Adelaide Rush	IceArenA
16	7 January 2002	17:00	Sydney Sirens	3–7	Brisbane Lightning	Boondall Iceworld
17	8 January 2002	07:00	Sydney Sirens	4–3 (OT)	Brisbane Lightning	Boondall Iceworld
18	8 January 2002	10:00	Perth Inferno	10–7	Adelaide Rush	IceArenA
19	14 January 2002	17:00	Sydney Sirens	2–3	Melbourne Ice	O'Brien Icehouse
20	15 January 2002	13:30	Sydney Sirens	4–3 (OT)	Melbourne Ice	O'Brien Icehouse

==== February ====
February
Game #	Date	Time	Away	Score	Home	Location	Recap
21	4 February 2022	16:30	Adelaide Rush	1–4	Perth Inferno	Cockburn Ice Arena
22	5 February 2022	10:00	Adelaide Rush	5–3	Perth Inferno	Cockburn Ice Arena
23	11 February 2022	16:30	Perth Inferno	0–6	Sydney Sirens	Macquarie Ice Rink
24	11 February 2022	17:00	Melbourne Ice	1–2	Brisbane Lightning	Boondall Iceworld
25	12 February 2022	07:00	Melbourne Ice	4–3 (SO)	Brisbane Lightning	Boondall Iceworld
26	12 February 2022	08:15	Perth Inferno	5–7	Sydney Sirens	Macquarie Ice Rink

==== March ====
March
Game #	Date	Time	Away	Score	Home	Location	Recap
27	4 March 2022	16:00	Brisbane Lightning	5–4	Adelaide Rush	IceArenA
28	4 March 2022	16:30	Melbourne Ice	1–3	Perth Inferno	Cockburn Ice Arena
29	5 March 2022	10:00	Brisbane Lightning	6–2	Adelaide Rush	IceArenA
30	5 March 2022	10:00	Melbourne Ice	4–3	Perth Inferno	Cockburn Ice Arena

Key:

Winner	Draw

=== Standings ===
Pos	Team	Pld	W	OTW	D	OTL	L	GF	GA	GD	Pts	Qualification or relegation
1	Melbourne Ice	12	8	1	0	1	2	47	24	+23	27	2023 Joan McKowen Finals
2	Sydney Sirens	12	6	3	0	0	3	63	43	+20	24	2023 Joan McKowen Finals
3	Brisbane Lightning	12	5	0	0	2	5	39	46	−7	17	2023 Joan McKowen Finals
4	Perth Inferno	12	5	0	0	1	6	51	53	−2	16	2023 Joan McKowen Finals
5	Adelaide Rush	12	2	0	0	0	10	31	65	−34	6	

Source: AWIHL Elite Prospects
Rules for classification:
Tie-break: 1) points; 2) goal difference; 3) number of goals scored
Points: 3 points for regulation win; 2 points for OT or SO win; 1 point for OT or SO loss or tie/draw; 0 points for regulation loss

=== Player stats ===
The season's league leader statistics for skaters and goaltenders.

Goals
No.	Name	Pos	G
1	(United States) Elizabeth Scala	Forward	15
2	(Canada) Danielle Butler	Forward	15
3	(Canada) Sarah Edney	Forward	13
4	(Australia) Michelle Clark-Crumpton	Forward	12
5	(Sweden) Linda Bjorling	Forward	10

Assists
No.	Name	Pos	A
1	(United States) Elizabeth Scala	Forward	13
2	(Australia) Michelle Clark-Crumpton	Forward	13
3	(Australia) Sharna Godfrey	Forward	12
4	(Sweden) Linda Bjorling	Forward	11
5	(Australia) Chrystina Acker	Forward	9

Points
No.	Name	Pos	P
1	(United States) Elizabeth Scala	Forward	28
2	(Australia) Michelle Clark-Crumpton	Forward	25
3	(Canada) Danielle Butler	Forward	23
4	(Australia) Sharna Godfrey	Forward	21
5	(Sweden) Linda Bjorling	Forward	21

Penalty minutes
No.	Name	Pos	PIM
1	(Australia) Sharna Godfrey	Forward	39
2	(Australia) Chrystina Acker	Forward	34
3	(Australia) Kristelle Van Der Wolf	Forward	33
4	(Australia) Katrina Rapchuk	Forward	31
5	(Australia) Sharnita Crompton	Forward	26

Save percentage
No.	Name	Pos	SV%
1	(Australia) Makayla Peers	Goaltender	.936
2	(Australia) Jenelle Carson	Goaltender	.930
3	(Turkey) Sera Dogramaci	Goaltender	.915
4	(Australia) Imogen Perry	Goaltender	.907
5	(Australia) Sasha King	Goaltender	.882

Goals against average
No.	Name	Pos	GAA
1	(Australia) Makayla Peers	Goaltender	1.56
2	(Australia) Jenelle Carson	Goaltender	2.13
3	(Australia) Imogen Perry	Goaltender	2.81
4	(Turkey) Sera Dogramaci	Goaltender	2.87
5	(Australia) Tina Girdler	Goaltender	3.50

=== Season awards ===
Below lists the 2022–23 AWIHL regular season award winners.

Award	Name	Team
Best Forward	(Canada) Danielle Butler	Melbourne Ice
Best Defence	(Canada) Sarah Edney	Sydney Sirens
Best Goaltender	(Australia) Makayla Peers	Melbourne Ice
Nellie Gee Rookie of the Year	(Australia) Katrina Rapchuk	Brisbane Lightning

== Joan McKowen playoffs ==
The top four teams in the AWIHL regular season qualify for the Joan McKowen Memorial Trophy playoffs. The playoffs is held on a single weekend and uses Australian conventions of being called Finals. The playoff system used by the AWIHL is a four team single game semi-finals and grand final system where the semi-final winners progress to the grand final and the losers playoff for third place. Semi-finals are played on the Saturday and the third place playoff and grand final is played on the Sunday. The prize for being crowned AWIHL Champions for winning the grand final is the Joan McKowen Memorial Trophy.

In 2022–23, the Ice, Sirens, Lightning and Inferno qualified for the finals weekend. The event was held on 18–19 in host city Melbourne at O’Brien Icehouse.

Semi-finals
18 March - Melbourne
Perth Inferno	2
Melbourne Ice	5
18 March - Melbourne
Brisbane Lightning	1
Sydney Sirens	4

Joan McKowen Final
19 March - Melbourne
Melbourne Ice	2
Sydney Sirens	5
Third place
19 March - Melbourne
Perth Inferno	3
Brisbane Lightning	2

=== Semi-finals ===
18 March 2023; 14:30	Perth Inferno	2–5 (1–1, 1–2, 0–2)	Melbourne Ice	O’Brien Icehouse

Game reference

(Australia) Sasha King
Goalies
(Australia) Makayla Peers
Referee:
Davida Paul
Linesmen:
Ainsley Gardner
Sarah Kinninment

	0–1	Butler (P.Cameron)
(Clark-Crumpton) Scala	1–1
	1–2	van der Wolf (Unassisted)
	1–3	Butler (Newman, G.Carson)
(Unassisted) Malcolm	2–3
	2–4	Butler (van der Wolf)
	2–5	Butler (van der Wolf)

22 min
Penalties
6 min
24
Shots
46

18 March 2023; 17:00	Brisbane Lightning	1–4 (0–0, 0–1, 1–3)	Sydney Sirens	O’Brien Icehouse

Game reference

(Australia) Imogen Perry
Goalies
(Turkey) Sera Dogramaci
Referee:
Cien Pereira
Linesmen:
Gabby Aston
Beth Bowshall

	0–1	Clarke (Brunt)
	0–2	Edney (McOnie, Tarasenko)
(Unassisted) Brown	1–2
	1–3	Godfrey (Bjorling, Edney)
	1–4	Edney (McOnie)

10 min
Penalties
2 min
25
Shots
24

=== Third place playoff ===
19 March 2023; 14:00	Perth Inferno	3–2 (2–0, 0–0, 1–2)	Brisbane Lightning	O’Brien Icehouse

Game reference

(Australia) Sasha King
Goalies
(Australia) Imogen Perry
Referee:
Davida Paul
Linesmen:
Gabby Aston
Sarah Kinninment

(Clark-Crumpton) Scala	1–0
(Kilgallon, Scala) Acker	2–0
	2–1	Crompton (Roberts)
	2–2	Crompton (Roberts)
(Unassisted) Scala	3–2

12 min
Penalties
8 min
24
Shots
30

=== Final ===
19 March 2023; 17:00	Melbourne Ice	2–5 (1–4, 0–1, 1–0)	Sydney Sirens	O’Brien Icehouse

Game reference

(Australia) Jenelle CARSON
Goalies
(Turkey) Sera Dogramaci
Referee:
Cien Pereira
Linesmen:
Ainsley Gardner
Beth Bowshall

	0–1	Godfrey (Bjorling, Payne)
	0–2	Edney (Roberts)
	0–3	Bjorling (Newmark, Payne)
(Butler, P.Cameron) Ellis	1–3
	1–4	Wilder (Unassisted)
	1–5	Bjorling (Brunt)
(Cochrane, Conlon) Aparicio	2–5

10 min
Penalties
8 min
37
Shots
17

Gold	Silver	Bronze
(New South Wales) Sydney Sirens	(Victoria (state)) Melbourne Ice	(Western Australia) Perth Inferno
