= Melbourne Ice (women) =

- City: Melbourne, Victoria
- League: Australian Women's Ice Hockey League
- Founded: 2005 (21 years ago)
- Operated: 2005–present
- Home arena: O'Brien Icehouse
- Colours: (2005-2010) (2010–present)
- Head coach: Drew Carfrae
- Captain: Stephenie Cochrane
- Affiliates: Melbourne Ice (AIHL)
- Website: https://www.miw.org.au/

Franchise history
- 2005–2010: Melbourne Dragons
- 2010–present: Melbourne Ice Women

Championships
- Regular season titles: 6 (2013, 2014, 2015, 2016, 2019, 2023)
- Joan McKowen trophy: 9 (2011, 2013, 2014, 2015, 2016, 2018, 2019, 2024,2025)

The Melbourne Ice Women is an Australian amateur ice hockey team from Melbourne, Victoria. Founded in 2005, the Ice have been a member of the Australian Women's Ice Hockey League (AWIHL) since inception in 2007. The Ice are based at the O'Brien Icehouse, located in the Docklands precinct of Melbourne. The team has won nine Joan McKowen trophies and are five-time league premiers, making them the most successful national ice hockey team in Australia.

== History ==
The Melbourne Dragons logo used between 2005 and 2010

Founded in 2005 as the Melbourne Fire, the Melbourne Dragons were one of four founding teams of the Australian Women's Ice Hockey League (AWIHL). The Dragons participated in the National Women's Program Showcase Series in 2006 and 2006/07 before the formal national league, the AWIHL, started in 2007/08. The Dragons joined the new league along with the Adelaide Assassins, Brisbane Goannas and Sydney Sirens.

In 2010, the Dragons entered into a memorandum of understanding (MoU) with the Melbourne Ice Hockey Club, who operate the Australian Ice Hockey League men's team. The agreement saw the Ice buy into the club as a minority partner, with the Dragons retaining majority share. The Dragons re-branded to the Melbourne Ice Women and started trading under the name Melbourne Ice. The team also moved into the Olympic sized Henke Rink at the Melbourne Icehouse within the Docklands precinct of Melbourne.

In 2011, the team won its first national championship and trophy. The Ice defeated the Sydney Sirens in the final to clinch the title and their maiden Joan McKowen Trophy. The Melbourne Ice placed second in the league standings at the end of the regular season with eight wins from twelve matches. In the finals, the Ice came up against the Sydney Sirens in a two match series for the Joan McKowen Trophy. In game one, the Ice shutout the Sirens and secured a 1–0 victory. In game two, the Ice maintained the goal difference to win 2–1 in a shootout and claim the national championship and the Joan McKowen Trophy.

The Ice became an AWIHL powerhouse in the 2010s. After their first title in 2011 the team went on to win another six championships and five premierships in the following eight years, including four straight premiership-championship doubles between 2013 and 2016. The last four Joan McKowen Trophy finals the Ice have contested, they have versed rivals Sydney Sirens. They have defeated the Sirens in every final match the two teams have faced each other. In 2019, the two teams met for the grand prize at the Adelaide IceArenA. The match was a tight affair with both teams locked at three-all with one minute left in regulation time. The Ice won the match and the trophy through a Bettina Meyers goal with 36.7 seconds left on the clock.

In 2019, the Melbourne Ice women were ranked 23rd in the Australasia Best Sporting Team (ABST) top twenty-five list. Produced by Platinum Asset Management and GAIN LINE Analytics, the list represents an analytical approach to measuring success in team sports in Australia and New Zealand within a rolling five-year period.

== Season-by-season results ==
Champions	Runners-up	Third place

Melbourne Dragons all-time record
Season	Regular season								Finals weekend							
Season	P	W	T	L	OW	OL	Pts	Finish	P	W	L	Result	Semi-final	Preliminary final	3rd place match	WL Trophy final
2007-08	Information not available															
2008-09	12	–	3	9	–	–	3	4th	2	–	2	Fourth	Lost 1-5 (Sirens)	–	Lost 0-3 (Goannas)	–
2009-10	14	5	2	7	–	–	12	3rd	1	–	1	Semi-finalist	Lost 4-3 (Sirens)	–		
Melbourne Ice all-time record
Season	Regular season								Finals weekend							
Season	P	W	T	L	OW	OL	Pts	Finish	P	W	L	Result	Semi-final	Preliminary final	3rd place match	JMK Trophy final
2010-11	12	8	–	4	–	–	24	2nd	2	2	–	Champion	Won 1-0 (Sirens)	–		Won 2-1 (Sirens)
2011-12	12	7	–	5	–	–	20	2nd	2	1	1	Runner-up	Won 7-3 (Adrenaline)	–		Lost 5-7 (Adrenaline)
2012-13	14	12	–	2	–	–	36	1st	2	2	–	Champion	Won 3-2 (Adrenaline)	–		Won 3-2 (Adrenaline)
2013-14	12	10	–	1	1	–	32	1st	2	2	–	Champion	Won 2-0 (Adrenaline)	–		Won 2-0 (Adrenaline)
2014-15	12	10	–	–	1	1	33	1st	2	2	–	Champion	Won 2-8 (Adrenaline)	–		Won 6-0 (Sirens)
2015-16	12	8	–	2	1	1	27	1st	3	2	1	Champion	Lost 2-8 (Sirens)	Won 7-4 (Goannas)	–	Won 7-6 (SO) (Sirens)
2016-17	12	5	–	5	1	1	18	3rd	2	1	1	Third	Lost 0-3 (Goannas)	–	Won 14-1 (Rush)	–
2017-18	12	8	–	4	–	–	24	2nd	2	2	–	Champion	Won 5-1 (Goannas)	–		Won 4-2 (Sirens)
2018-19	12	10	–	1	–	1	31	1st	2	2	–	Champion	Won 9-2 (Goannas)	–		Won 4-3 (Sirens)
2019-20	12	7	1	3	–	1	23	3rd	2	1	1	Third	Lost 2-4 (Rush)	–	Won 4-3 (Inferno)	–
2020-21	Season canceled due to the COVID-19 pandemic															
2021-22	Season canceled due to the COVID-19 pandemic															
2022-23	12	8	0	2	1	1	27	1st	2	1	1	Runner-up	Won 5-2 (Inferno)	–		Lost 2-5 (Sirens)
2023-24	16	8	1	6	0	1	26	4th	2	2	0	Champion	Won 5-2 (Rush)	–		Won 4-1 (Inferno)
2024-25	16	8	0	6	1	1	27	3rd	2	2	0	Champion	Won 5-2 (Inferno)	–		Won 5-2 (Rush)
2025-26	20	12	0	8	0	0	36	3rd	2	1	1	Third	Lost 4-5 (Lightning)	-	Won 5-1 (Sirens)	-
2026-27	-	-	-	-	-	-	-	-	-	-	-	-	-	-	-	-

== Championships ==
- Joan McKowen Trophy

Champions (9): 2011, 2013, 2014, 2015, 2016, 2018, 2019, 2024, 2025
Runners-up (2): 2012, 2023

- West Lakes Trophy (repurposed as league premiership trophy in 2010)

Premiers (5): 2013, 2014, 2015, 2016, 2019
Runners-up (3): 2011, 2012, 2018

== Roster ==
Team roster for the 2023-24 AWIHL season.

Melbourne Ice roster - 2023-24 AWIHL season
Active roster		Inactive roster	Coaching staff
Goaltenders: 30 (Australia) Kayla Best; 1 (Australia) Jenelle Carson; 50 (Australia) Makayla Peers; Defencemen: 8 (Australia) Paige Cameron; 21 (Canada) Mary Claire Geneau (I); 2 (Canada) Beatrice Dufour (I); 15 (Australia) Christine Dutton; 11 (Australia) Nicole Le Cren; 12 (Australia) Georgia Moore (C); 18 (Australia) Marnie Pullin; 71 (Australia) Isabela Raymundo	Forwards: 13 (Australia) Ashlie Aparicio; 3 (Australia) Tara Baker; 24 (Australia) Neila Brenning; 86 (Canada) Danielle Butler (I); 14 (Australia) Stephenie Cochrane (A); 19 (Australia) Stephanie Conlon; 17 (Australia) Sharna Godfrey; 10 (Australia) Amelia Grigaliunas; 91 (Canada) Christina Julien (I); 6 (Australia) Hope Newman	-- (Australia) Meika Gunning (NF); -- (United States) Kirsti Hakala Assendelft (NF); -- (Australia) Danielle Howe (DP); -- (Australia) Bryher Johnson (DP); -- (Australia) Poppy Kelly (DP); -- (Australia) Aurelia Marion (DP); -- (Australia) Jasmin Mayor (DP); -- (Australia) Taylie Nelson (DP)	Head Coach: (Canada) Curtis Klooster; (Australia) Spenser Robbins; Coaches: (Australia) Bryan Mackenzie; (Australia) Valerie Webster; Legend (C) Captain (A) Alternate Captain (I) Import player Statistics; Locals: 17; Imports: 4
Last updated on: 2 December 2023
IHA IHNA

== Leaders ==
=== Captains ===
Season	Captains		
Season	Captain	Alternative	Alternative
2005–07	Information not available		
2008–09	(Australia) Shona Green	(Australia) Lucy Parrington	
2009–10	(Australia) Shona Green	(Australia) Lucy Parrington	
2010–11	(Australia) Shona Green	(Australia) Lucy Parrington	
2011-12	(Australia) Shona Green	(Australia) Lucy Parrington	(Canada) Nicole Tritter
2012-13	(Australia) Shona Green	(Australia) Lucy Parrington	(Canada) Nicole Tritter
2013-14	(Australia) Shona Green	(Australia) Lucy Parrington	(Australia) Christine Cockerell
2014-15	(Australia) Shona Green	(Australia) Lucy Parrington	(Australia) Christine Cockerell
2015-16	(Australia) Shona Green	(Australia) Lucy Parrington	(Australia) Georgia Carson
2016-17	(Australia) Shona Green	(Australia) Georgia Carson	(Australia) Rylie Padjen
2017-18	(Australia) Rylie Padjen	(Australia) Shona Green	(Australia) Georgia Moore
2018-19	(Australia) Rylie Padjen	(Australia) Shona Green	(Australia) Georgia Moore
2019-20	(Canada) Christina Julien	(Australia) Rylie Padjen	(Australia) Georgia Moore
2020–21	Two seasons cancelled due to the COVID-19 pandemic		
2022-23	(Canada) Sarah Dash	(Australia) Rylie Ellis	(Australia) Georgia Moore
2023-24	(Australia) Georgia Moore	(Australia) Stephenie Cochrane	(Canada) Danielle Butler

=== Coaching staff ===
Season	Head coach		
Season	One	Two	Three
2005-08	Information not available		
2009-10	(Australia) Simon Holmes	(Australia) Travis Alabaster	
2010-11	(Canada) Lee Brown	(Australia) Tommy Powell	(Australia) Nicholas Trusewicz
2011-12	(Canada) Lee Brown	(Australia) Tommy Powell	(Canada) Bruce Poling
2012-13	(Australia) Tommy Powell	(Canada) Matt Armstrong	(Canada) Bruce Poling
2013-14	(Australia) Tommy Powell	(Canada) Matt Armstrong	(Australia) Gina Carroll
2015-16	(Australia) Jeremy Muir	(Australia) Marcus Wong	(Australia) Chris Wong
2016-17	(Australia) Jeremy Muir	(Australia) Marcus Wong	(Australia) Chris Wong
2017-18	(Australia) Marcus Wong	(Australia) Mark Smith	(Australia) Brent Laver
2018-19	(Australia) Marcus Wong	(Australia) Mark Smith	(Australia) Laurie Piggot
2019-20	(Australia) Marcus Wong	(Australia) Mark Smith	(Australia) Laurie Piggot
2020–21	Two seasons cancelled due to the COVID-19 pandemic		
2022-23	(Australia) Rod Johns	(Australia) Andrew Masters	
2023-24	(Canada) Curtis Klooster	(Australia) Spenser Robbins	(Canada) Bryan Mackenzie

=== Management ===
Season	Team Manager	Assistant	Trainer
2005-07	Information not available		
2007-08	(Australia) Shirley Geraghty	(Australia) Travis Alabaster	
2008-09	(Australia) Kylie Taylor	(Australia) Travis Alabaster	
2009-10	(Australia) Kylie Taylor	(Australia) Travis Alabaster	
2010-11	(Australia) Kylie Taylor	(Australia) Travis Alabaster	
2011-12	(Australia) Kylie Taylor	(Australia) Michelle Zintschenko	(Australia) Tanya Chalmers
2012-13	(Australia) Kylie Taylor	(Australia) Michelle Zintschenko	(Australia) Tanya Chalmers
2013-14	(Australia) Michelle Zintschenko	(Australia) Jack Hammet	
2014-15	(Australia) Michelle Zintschenko	(Australia) James Meredith	
2015-16	(Australia) Kylie Taylor	(Australia) Michelle Zintschenko	(Australia) James McConnell
2016-17	(Australia) Michelle Zintschenko	(Australia) Valerie Webster	(Australia) James McConnell
2017-18	(Australia) Valerie Webster	(Australia) James McConnell	(Australia) Cam Charter
2018-19	(Australia) Valerie Webster	(Australia) Cam Charter	
2019-20	(Australia) Valerie Webster	(Australia) Cam Charter	
2020–21	Two seasons cancelled due to the COVID-19 pandemic		
2022-23	(Australia) Valerie Webster		(Australia) Keira Dunwood
2023-24	(Australia) Valerie Webster		

== Identity ==
=== Name and colours ===
Since 2010, the team have identified with the Melbourne Ice branding including the colours navy blue, crimson red and white. The colours are used in all aspects of the club including: uniforms, supporter merchandise, official media and digital design. Prior to 2010, when the team operated in the AWIHL as the Melbourne Dragons, the team identified with the colours indigo blue and white. The team has changed names once, in 2010 after the signing of the MoU between the Dragons and Ice. Since 2010 the team has identified as the Melbourne Ice.

Team name changes
#	Colours	Name	Period
1		Melbourne Dragons	2005–09
2		Melbourne Ice	2010–present

=== Facilities ===
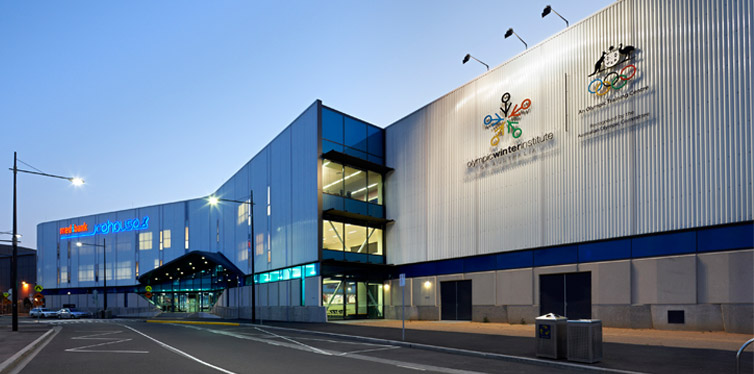
Entrance to O'Brien Icehouse

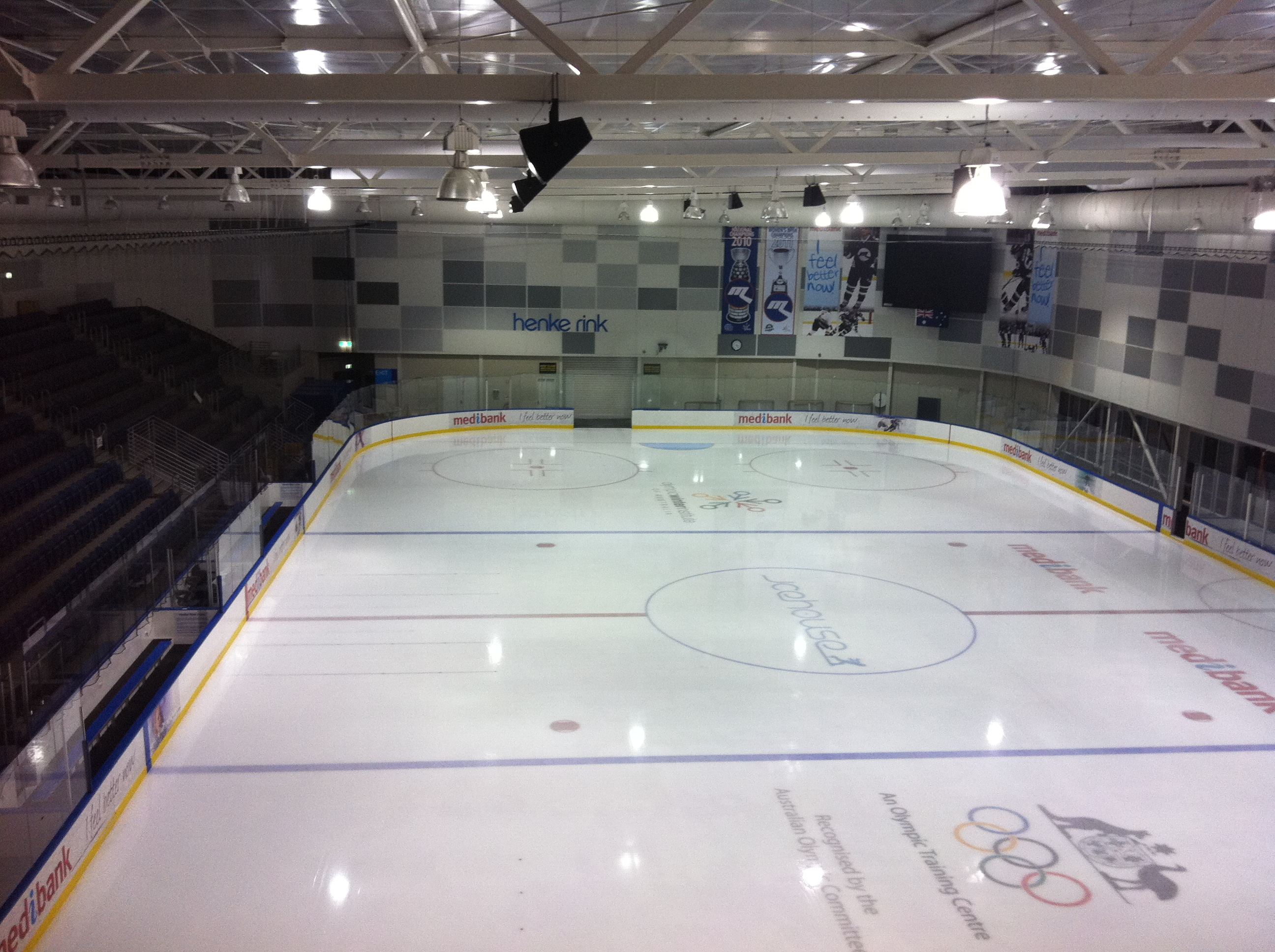
The Henke Rink inside the Icehouse, home of the Melbourne Ice

In 2010, after the Dragons re-branded to the Melbourne Ice, they moved into the newly completed $58m Melbourne Icehouse (Known as the O’Brien Icehouse for sponsorship reasons), located in the Docklands precinct of Melbourne. The Ice have played all their home matches from the 2010/11 AWIHL season onwards at the Icehouse. The Icehouse is the only twin ice-sheet facility in Australia. The hockey rink within the facility is named the Henke Rink, in honour of Geoffrey Henke AO. The Icehouse has an Olympic sized ice surface, café, bar, specialist winter sports gym, pro shop, corporate boxes and seating for 1,000 spectators as well as room for additional 500 standing attendance on match days.

Prior to 2010, for five years, the Ice, when they were the Dragons, were based in Oakleigh South, Monash in the wider Melbourne metropolitan area. Their home venue was the 300 capacity Olympic Ice Skating Centre (OISC), noted at the time for being a small rink, with its width two-thirds that of a regulation Olympic-sized rink.

Stadium history
Rink	Location	Period
Olympic Ice Skating Centre	Oakleigh South	2005–09
Melbourne Icehouse	Docklands	2010–present

== Broadcasting ==
Current:

- Sportscast Australia (2023–present) - On 24 October 2023, the AWIHL signed an agreement with Sportscast Australia to stream the 2023-24 AWIHL season. Launched as AWIHL.TV, every game of the regular and post-season would be available live and on-demand for free, with no region-locks, through the AWIHl.TV website and YouTube.

Former:

- Clutch.TV (2022–23) - On 22 October 2022, the AWIHL announced a streaming partnership with Australian streaming provider Clutch.TV for worldwide streaming rights for the 2022-23 AWIHL season. Every game of the regular and post-season would be available live and on-demand for free on the Clutch streaming platform. This partnership came to an abrupt end in September 2023, ahead of the new AWIHL season, when Clutch Pty Ltd, who operates Clutch.TV, entered administration and ceased all operations.
- Kayo Sports (2018–22) – The AWIHL signed a broadcasting deal with Fox Sports in 2018 to stream on their Kayo Sports platform, a weekly 'game of the week' and 20-minutes highlight package with commentary and player interviews each round of the 2018-19 AWIHL season. This agreement was extended in the 2019–20 season, but was put on hold during the COVID-19 pandemic, when the AWIHL had to cancel two consecutive seasons.

== See also ==
- Ice Hockey Australia
- Joan McKowen Memorial Trophy
- Australian Ice Hockey League
- Australian Junior Ice Hockey League
- Jim Brown Trophy
- Goodall Cup
