= 2016–17 AWIHL season =

- League: Australian Women's Ice Hockey League
- Sport: Ice hockey
- Duration: 29 October 2016 – 26 February 2017
- Games: 12
- Teams: 4

Regular season
- Premiers: Sydney Sirens
- Top scorer: Christina Julien

Joan McKowen Memorial Trophy
- Champions: Sydney Sirens
- Runners-up: Brisbane Goannas

AWIHL seasons
- ← 2015–16 2017–18 →

The 2016–17 AWIHL season is the tenth season of the Australian Women's Ice Hockey League. It ran from 29 October 2016 until 26 February 2017.

== Regular season ==
The regular season began on 29 October 2016 and finished on 26 February 2017

=== October ===
Game	Date	Time	Away	Score	Home	Location	Recap
1	29 October 2016	17:00	Adelaide Rush	0 - 6	Sydney Sirens	Canterbury Olympic Ice Rink	
2	29 October 2016	17:00	Brisbane Goannas	7 - 4	Melbourne Ice	O'Brien Group Arena	
3	30 October 2016	10:15	Adelaide Rush	1 - 8	Sydney Sirens	Canterbury Olympic Ice Rink	
4	30 October 2016	13:15	Brisbane Goannas	1 - 3	Melbourne Ice	O'Brien Group Arena	

=== November ===
Game	Date	Time	Away	Score	Home	Location	Recap
5	12 November 2016	16:30	Melbourne Ice	7 - 1	Adelaide Rush	Adelaide Ice Arena	
6	13 November 2016	10:00	Melbourne Ice	13 - 0	Adelaide Rush	Adelaide Ice Arena	
7	26 November 2016	16:00	Sydney Sirens	2 - 1 (SO)	Brisbane Goannas	Ice World Boondall	
8	27 November 2016	7:30	Sydney Sirens	3 - 2 (SO)	Brisbane Goannas	Ice World Boondall	

=== December ===
Game	Date	Time	Away	Score	Home	Location	Recap
9	3 December 2016	17:00	Melbourne Ice	1 - 7	Sydney Sirens	Canterbury Olympic Ice Rink	
10	4 December 2016	10:15	Melbourne Ice	3 - 8	Sydney Sirens	Canterbury Olympic Ice Rink	
11	11 December 2016	16:00	Adelaide Rush	0 - 2	Brisbane Goannas	Ice World Boondall	
12	12 December 2016	7:30	Adelaide Rush	1 - 8	Brisbane Goannas	Ice World Boondall	

=== January ===
Game	Date	Time	Away	Score	Home	Location	Recap
13	14 January 2017	16:30	Brisbane Goannas	8 – 1	Adelaide Rush	Adelaide Ice Arena	
14	14 January 2017	17:00	Sydney Sirens	5 – 2	Melbourne Ice	O'Brien Group Arena	
15	15 January 2017	10:00	Brisbane Goannas	7 – 2	Adelaide Rush	Adelaide Ice Arena	
16	15 January 2017	14:15	Sydney Sirens	4 – 3 (SO)	Melbourne Ice	O'Brien Group Arena	

=== February ===
Game	Date	Time	Away	Score	Home	Location	Recap
17	4 February 2017	17:00	Brisbane Goannas	2 - 6	Sydney Sirens	Canterbury Olympic Ice Rink	
18	4 February 2017	17:00	Adelaide Rush	3 - 17	Melbourne Ice	O'Brien Group Arena	
19	5 February 2017	10:15	Brisbane Goannas	2 - 4	Sydney Sirens	Canterbury Olympic Ice Rink	
20	5 February 2017	13:15	Adelaide Rush	1 - 10	Melbourne Ice	O'Brien Group Arena	
21	18 February 2017	16:00	Melbourne Ice	5 – 4 (SO)	Brisbane Goannas	Ice World Boondall	
22	19 February 2017	7:30	Melbourne Ice	2 - 3	Brisbane Goannas	Ice World Boondall	
23	25 February 2017	16:30	Sydney Sirens	12 - 0	Adelaide Rush	Adelaide Ice Arena	
24	26 February 2017	10:00	Sydney Sirens	11 - 1	Adelaide Rush	Adelaide Ice Arena	

== Standings ==
Note: GP = Games played; W = Wins; SW = Shootout Wins; SL = Shootout losses; L = Losses; GF = Goals for; GA = Goals against; GDF = Goal Differential; PTS = Points

The regular season league standings are as follows:

Team	GP	W	SW	SL	L	GF	GA	GDF	PTS
Sydney Sirens	10	7	3	0	0	53	17	+36	27
Brisbane Goannas	10	5	0	2	3	46	22	+22	17
Melbourne Ice	10	5	0	1	4	63	37	+26	16
Adelaide Rush	10	0	0	0	10	10	86	-76	0

== Playoffs ==
=== Semi Final 1 ===
11 March 2017; 5:00pm	Sydney Sirens 10	v	0 Adelaide Rush	Canterbury Olympic Ice Rink

=== Semi Final 2 ===
11 March 2017; 7:30pm	Melbourne Ice 0	v	3 Brisbane Goannas	Canterbury Olympic Ice Rink

=== Bronze-medal game ===
12 March 2017; 4:00pm	Melbourne Ice 14	v	1 Adelaide Rush	Canterbury Olympic Ice Rink

=== Gold-medal game ===
12 March 2017; 7:30pm	Sydney Sirens 4 (S/O)	v	3 Brisbane Goannas	Canterbury Olympic Ice Rink

== See also ==
- Ice Hockey Australia
- Joan McKowen Memorial Trophy
