= Adelaide Rush =

Australian women's ice hockey team

- City: (Australia) Adelaide, SA
- League: Australian Women's Ice Hockey League
- Founded: 2005 (21 years ago)
- Home arena: Adelaide Ice Arena
- Colours: (2005–2011) (2011–2016) (2016–present)
- Head coach: (Australia) Jeff Fode
- Captain: (Australia) Natasha Farrier
- Website: adelaiderush.com.au

Franchise history
- 2005–2011: Adelaide Assassins
- 2011–2016: Adelaide Adrenaline
- 2016–present: Adelaide Rush

Championships
- Regular season titles: 3 (2010, 2012, 2025)
- Joan McKowen trophy: 6 (2006, 2007, 2008, 2009, 2010, 2012)

The Adelaide Rush is an Australian amateur ice hockey team from Adelaide, South Australia. Founded in 2005 as the Adelaide Assassins, the Rush, who were also known as the Adrenaline for four years, have been a member of the Australian Women's Ice Hockey League (AWIHL) since inception in 2007. The Rush are based at the Adelaide Ice Arena in the central suburb of Thebarton in Adelaide. The team has won six Joan McKowen trophies and are three time league premiers.

== History ==
=== Pre-AWIHL ===
The Adelaide Rush were founded in 2005 as the Adelaide Assassins. The team joined the National Women's Program Showcase Series announced by Ice Hockey Australia in 2005. The Showcase series would be an opportunity to build up to establishing a fully-fledged national women's league. Adelaide competed in the two Showcase Series in 2006 and 2007.

In early 2006, the Assassins appointed the Australian U18 national team assistant coach, Pier Martin, as their inaugural head coach for the 2006 Showcase Series. Adelaide selected thirteen players in their first roster, including at least seven Australian internationals in Lucy Parrington, Jodie Walker, Serena Yu, Mel McLaren, Tash Farrier, Candice Mitchell and Tamra Jones. The first Showcase began in February 2006 with five teams, Adelaide Assassins, Sydney Sirens, Brisbane Goannas, Canberra Ice Caps and Melbourne Flames. Adelaide won the first Showcase Series, finishing top of the standings with 18 points from 12 games, defeating the Sirens by four points to the title. In the second Showcase Series in 2006-07, the Assassins went undefeated to win the Showcase back-to-back. Adelaide was the first team to lift the West Lakes Trophy in 2007, which had been donated by Westlakes Trophies and Framing to the National Women's Program. The Assassins closest game in the second Showcase was a 6-4 victory over the Sydney Sirens on 11 February 2007.

=== AWIHL ===
The newly formed Australian Women's Ice Hockey League had its inaugural season in the 2007–08 season, where the Adelaide Assassins would again win the championship. At this time the championship trophy awarded to the winners of the finals was the West Lakes Trophy, made by Westlakes Trophies and Framing.

On August 8, 2011, the Adelaide Assassins merged with the Adelaide Adrenaline ice hockey club. The move was made to increase the exposure of women's hockey in Australia with the help of associating with an already well known brand with which they could share resources with.

Before the 2016 season began, the Adrenaline were re branded as Adelaide Rush.

== Club identity ==
=== Adelaide Assassins (2005-11) ===
The Assassins were founded with a red, black and white colour scheme. The team's uniforms were prodomantly red with black and white horizontal stripes. The team's logo followed the same colour scheme with Adelaide Assassins spelt out in full with a customised typeface. The logo featured a black bullet swooshing from the top left to the bottom right.

=== Adelaide Adrenaline (2011-16) ===
On 8 August 2011, the Adelaide Assassins merged with the Adelaide Adrenaline ice hockey organisation as part of the wider AWIHL and Australian Ice Hockey League (AIHL) policy for teams to merge or sign memorandum of understanding (MoU) agreements to better align the two leagues and share resources. This resulted in the Assassins adopting the Adrenaline logo, colour scheme and uniforms. Shifting from predominantly red to dark blue with red, yellow and white secondary colours. The new logo consisted of a hockey puck with AA on the face and a hand breaking through clutching a hockey stick.

=== Adelaide Rush (2016-present) ===
On 12 July 2016, the Adelaide Adrenaline's men's and women's programs de-coupled, with the women's program becoming independent once more. The team updated its branding and name, adopting the name Adelaide Rush and new colour scheme of red and navy blue. The team uniforms would revert to predominantly red with a large blue horizontal blue stripe on the front. The new round 'badge' logo features a large red 'R' in its centre on a navy-blue background. This is surrounded by a red ring with navy blue trim with the team's name 'Adelaide Rush' and the year date '2016'. In 2024, the Rush debuted a sky blue alternative jersey for the first time.

== Championships ==
- Joan McKowen Trophy

(gold) Champions (6): 2006, 2007, 2008, 2009, 2010, 2012
(silver) Runners-up (3): 2013, 2014, 2020

- Premierships (Gower Memorial Shield / West Lakes Trophy)

(gold) Premiers (3): 2010, 2012, 2025
(silver) Runners-up (6): 2009, 2013, 2014, 2015, 2020, 2024

== Players ==
=== Current roster ===
Team roster for the 2024-25 AWIHL season.

Adelaide Rush roster - 2024-25 AWIHL season
Active roster		Inactive roster	Coaching staff
Goaltenders: 1 (Australia) Rebecca Kempe; 25 (Belgium) Emma Moonen; 30 (Australia) Joanne Phillis; 31 (Australia) Claudia Tom; Defencemen: 11 (Canada) Aspen Cooper (I); -- (Australia) Lalia Giveen; 24 (Australia) Elana Holub; 7 (Australia) Cherie Reid; 27 (Canada) Maya Tupper (I); 6 (Australia) Tiffany Venning; 59 (Australia) Kirsty Venus (A); 97 (Australia) Anika Wegund	Forwards: 12 (Australia) Natalie Ayris; 20 (Australia) Amber Bedell; 23 (Australia) Taylor Botterill; 4 (Australia) Torie Cybulski; 22 (Australia) Natasha Farrier (C); 8 (Australia) Kelly Harris; 94 (Canada) Jordan Kulbida (I); 14 (Australia) Madeline Langevin; 2 (Australia) Jamie Lunn; 9 (Australia) Kaitlyn Malthaner (A); 34 (Canada) Sierra Meroniuk (I); 13 (Australia) Anika Mojzisek; 15 (Australia) Ricki Sinclair; 21 (Australia) Kate Tihema (A)	-- (Australia) Maggie Prior (NF); -- (Australia) Sophie Wandel (NF); -- (Australia) ayley Whitington (NF)	Head Coach: (Australia) Jeffrey Fode; Coaches: (Australia) Jeremy Friederich (AC); (Australia) Jason Nordin (AC); (Australia) Tyler Boyle (DC); (Australia) Michael MacLean (GC); Legend (C) Captain (A) Alternate Captain (I) Import player Statistics; Locals: 22; Imports: 4
Last updated on: 2 December 2023
IHA IHNA

== Leaders ==
=== Captains ===
The Rush have had six captains in the team's known history, including ten seasons with Candice Mitchell over two stints.

Season	Captain	Alt Captain One	Alt Captain Two
2006	Information not available
2006–07	Information not available
2007–08	(Australia) Candice Mitchell
2008–09	(Australia) Candice Mitchell
2009–10	(Australia) Candice Mitchell
2010–11	(Australia) Candice Mitchell
2011–12	(Australia) Candice Mitchell
2012–13	(Australia) Candice Mitchell
2013–14	(Australia) Candice Mitchell	(United Kingdom) Bethanie Kavanagh	(Australia) Sari Lehmann
2014–15	(Australia) Candice Mitchell	(United Kingdom) Bethanie Kavanagh	(Australia) Sari Lehmann
2015–16	(Australia) Candice Mitchell	(United Kingdom) Bethanie Kavanagh	(Australia) Kate Tihema
2016–17	(Australia) Sari Lehmann	(Australia) Kelly Harris	(United Kingdom) Kirsty Venus^{1}
2017–18	(United States) Ashley Pelkey	(United States) Hannah Wright	(Australia) Candice Mitchell
2018–19	(Australia) Candice Mitchell
2019–20	(Australia) Kirsty Venus
2022–23	(Australia) Natalie Ayris
2023–24	(Australia) Natasha Farrier	(Australia) Kaitlyn Malthaner	(Australia) Kate Tihema
2024–25	(Australia) Natasha Farrier	(Australia) Kaitlyn Malthaner	(Australia) Kate Tihema^{2}

^{1} In 2016–17, the Rush had three alternative captains, rather than the normal two, Tess Reynolds was the third alternative captain.
^{2} In 2024–25, the Rush had three alternative captains, rather than the normal two, Kirsty Venus was the third alternative captain.

=== Head coaches ===
The Rush have had seven head coaches in the team's known history, including Josef Rezek who had two stints as head coach.

No.	Name	Term
1	(Australia) Pier Martin	2006
2	(Australia) John Botterill	2008–13
3	(Australia) Josef Rezek	2013–16
4	(Australia) Mitch Kelleher	2016–17
5	(Australia) Josef Rezek	2017–18
6	(United Kingdom) Jamie Holland	2018–19
7	(Australia) Hayden Crafter	2019–20
8	(Canada) Joey McDougall	2022–23
9	(Australia) Jeffrey Fode	2024–Present

== Broadcasting ==
Current:

- Sportscast Australia (2023 - present) - On 24 October 2023, the AWIHL signed an agreement with Sportscast Australia to stream the 2023-24 AWIHL season. Launched as AWIHL.TV, every game of the regular and post-season would be available live and on-demand for free, with no region-locks, through the AWIHl.TV website and YouTube.

Former:

- Clutch.TV (2022-23) - On 22 October 2022, the AWIHL announced a streaming partnership with Australian streaming provider Clutch.TV for worldwide streaming rights for the 2022-23 AWIHL season. Every game of the regular and post-season would be available live and on-demand for free on the Clutch streaming platform. This partnership came to an abrupt end in September 2023, ahead of the new AWIHL season, when Clutch Pty Ltd, who operates Clutch.TV, entered administration and ceased all operations.
- Kayo Sports (2018-22) – The AWIHL signed a broadcasting deal with Fox Sports in 2018 to stream on their Kayo Sports platform, a weekly 'game of the week' and 20-minutes highlight package with commentary and player interviews each round of the 2018-19 AWIHL season. This agreement was extended in the 2019-20 season, but was put on hold during the COVID-19 pandemic, when the AWIHL had to cancel two consecutive seasons.

== See also ==
- Ice Hockey Australia
- Joan McKowen Memorial Trophy
- Australian Ice Hockey League
- Australian Junior Ice Hockey League
- Jim Brown Trophy
- Goodall Cup
