= 2014–15 AWIHL season =

- League: Australian Women's Ice Hockey League
- Sport: Ice hockey
- Duration: 25 October 2014 – 15 February 2015
- Games: 12
- Teams: 4

Regular season
- Premiers: Melbourne Ice
- Top scorer: Christine Bestland

Joan McKowen Memorial Trophy
- Champions: Melbourne Ice
- Runners-up: Sydney Sirens

AWIHL seasons
- ← 2013–14 2015–16 →

The 2014–15 AWIHL season is the eighth season of the Australian Women's Ice Hockey League. It ran from 25 October 2015 until 15 February 2015.

== Regular season ==
The regular season ran from 25 October 2014 to 15 February 2015.

=== October ===
Game	Date	Time	Away	Score	Home	Location	Recap
1	25 October 2014	17:00	Sydney Sirens	0–3	Melbourne Ice	Medibank Icehouse	
2	25 October 2014	16:00	Brisbane Goannas	1–3	Adelaide Adrenaline	Ice Arena (Adelaide)	
3	25 October 2014	17:00	Sydney Sirens	3–4 (SO)	Melbourne Ice	Medibank Icehouse	
4	26 October 2014	10:00	Brisbane Goannas	1–5	Adelaide Adrenaline	Ice Arena (Adelaide)	

=== November ===
Game	Date	Time	Away	Score	Home	Location	Recap
5	8 November 2014	17:45	Brisbane Goannas	3–4 (SO)	Sydney Sirens	Sydney Ice Arena	
6	9 November 2014	08:15	Brisbane Goannas	4–3	Sydney Sirens	Sydney Ice Arena	
7	22 November 2014	17:00	Adelaide Adrenaline	1–2	Melbourne Ice	Medibank Icehouse	
8	23 November 2014	13:15	Adelaide Adrenaline	4–3 (SO)	Melbourne Ice	Medibank Icehouse	
9	29 November 2014	16:45	Sydney Sirens	5–1	Brisbane Goannas	Ice World Acacia	
10	30 November 2014	08:30	Sydney Sirens	6–0	Brisbane Goannas	Ice World Acacia	

=== December ===
Game	Date	Time	Away	Score	Home	Location	Recap
11	6 December 2014	17:45	Adelaide Adrenaline	4–3	Sydney Sirens	Boondall	
12	7 December 2014	08:15	Adelaide Adrenaline	6–2	Sydney Sirens	Boondall	
13	13 December 2014	17:00	Melbourne Ice	6–1	Brisbane Goannas	Ice World Boondall	
14	14 December 2014	08:30	Melbourne Ice	5–3	Brisbane Goannas	Ice World Acacia	

=== January ===
Game	Date	Time	Away	Score	Home	Location	Recap
15	17 January 2015	17:00	Brisbane Goannas	1–11	Melbourne Ice	Medibank Icehouse	
16	17 January 2015	16:00	Sydney Sirens	2–1	Adelaide Adrenaline	Ice Arena (Adelaide)	
17	18 January 2015	13:15	Brisbane Goannas	3–4	Melbourne Ice	Medibank Icehouse	
18	18 January 2015	10:00	Sydney Sirens	6–3	Adelaide Adrenaline	Ice Arena (Adelaide)	
19	31 January 2015	16:00	Melbourne Ice	7–0	Adelaide Adrenaline	Ice Arena (Adelaide)	

=== February ===
Game	Date	Time	Away	Score	Home	Location	Recap
20	1 February 2015	10:00	Melbourne Ice	2–1	Adelaide Adrenaline	Ice Arena (Adelaide)	
21	7 February 2015	17:45	Melbourne Ice	4–2	Sydney Sirens	Sydney Ice Arena	
22	8 February 2015	08:15	Melbourne Ice	3–2	Sydney Sirens	Sydney Ice Arena	
23	14 February 2015	17:00	Adelaide Adrenaline	4–3	Brisbane Goannas	Ice World Boondall	
24	15 February 2015	8:30	Adelaide Adrenaline	5–0	Brisbane Goannas	Ice World Boondall	

== Standings ==
Note: GP = Games played; W = Wins; SW = Shootout Wins; SL = Shootout losses; L = Losses; GF = Goals for; GA = Goals against; GDF = Goal differential; PTS = Points

The regular season league standings are as follows:

Team	GP	W	SW	SL	L	GF	GA	GDF	PTS
Melbourne Ice	12	10	1	1	0	54	21	+33	33
Adelaide Adrenaline	12	6	1	0	5	37	32	+5	20
Sydney Sirens	12	4	1	1	6	38	36	+2	15
Brisbane Goannas	12	1	0	1	10	21	61	-40	4

== Scoring leaders ==
Note: GP = Games played; G = Goals; A = Assists; Pts = Points; PIM = Penalty minutes

Player	Team	GP	G	A	Pts	PIM
Alivia Del Basso	Melbourne Ice	12	13	12	25	18
Christine Bestland	Melbourne Ice	8	14	9	23	10
Bethanie Kavanagh	Adelaide Adrenaline	11	8	13	21	8
Natasha Farrier	Adelaide Adrenaline	11	12	6	18	6
Shona Green	Melbourne Ice	12	3	15	18	15
Anjali Thakker	Melbourne Ice	12	8	8	16	4
Sharna Godfrey	Sydney Sirens	12	12	3	15	14
Kelly Costa	Brisbane Goannas	12	4	7	11	16
Kayla Kaluzny	Melbourne Ice	4	6	4	10	0
Lindsay Audia	Melbourne Ice	10	2	7	9	8

== Leading goaltenders ==
Note: GP = Games played; Mins = Minutes played; W = Wins; L = Losses: OTL = Overtime losses; SL = Shootout losses; GA = Goals Allowed; SO = Shutouts; GAA = Goals against average

Player	Team	GP	Mins	W	L	GA	SO	Sv%	GAA
Shanley Peters	Melbourne Ice	9	439:41	7	1	12	2	0.946	1.39
Shannon Giebelhaus	Adelaide Adrenaline	2	273:34	2	3	12	0	0.911	2.24
Sera Doğramacı	Sydney Sirens	8	391:01	4	4	21	0	0.915	2.74
Michala Jefferies	Sydney Sirens	4	204:00	1	3	14	0	0.904	3.50
Keesha Atkins	Brisbane Goannas	12	566	1	11	59	0	0.841	5.32

== Playoffs ==
The finals series was hosted in Adelaide, South Australia, at Ice Arena (Adelaide) over the weekend of 21–22 February 2015.

=== Quarter Final Game 1 ===
21 February 2015; 16:00	Melbourne Ice	5–1 (2–1), (3–1), (5–1)	Adelaide Adrenaline	Ice Arena (Adelaide)

Game reference
Shanley Peters	Goalies	Shannon Giebelhaus	Referee: Bill Newbound; Linesmen: Chris Parks; Damian Smith
6 min	Penalties	6 min	Referee: Bill Newbound; Linesmen: Chris Parks; Damian Smith
29	Shots	17	Referee: Bill Newbound; Linesmen: Chris Parks; Damian Smith

=== Quarter Final Game 2 ===
21 February 2015; 17:45	Sydney Sirens	2–1 (0–1), (1–1), (2–1)	Brisbane Goannas	Ice Arena (Adelaide)

Game reference
Michala Jefferies	Goalies	Keesha Atkins	Referee: Erica Marshall; Linesmen: Travis Alabaster; Peta Gouden
8 min	Penalties	10 min	Referee: Erica Marshall; Linesmen: Travis Alabaster; Peta Gouden
18	Shots	25	Referee: Erica Marshall; Linesmen: Travis Alabaster; Peta Gouden

=== Semi-final ===
22 February 2015; 10:00	Adelaide Adrenaline	1–2 (1–0), (1–0), (1–2)	Sydney Sirens	Ice Arena (Adelaide)

Game reference
Claudia Tom	Goalies	Michala Jefferies	Referee: Erica Marshall; Linesmen: Travis Alabaster; Peta Gouden
58 min	Penalties	12 min	Referee: Erica Marshall; Linesmen: Travis Alabaster; Peta Gouden
26	Shots	32	Referee: Erica Marshall; Linesmen: Travis Alabaster; Peta Gouden

=== Bronze-medal game ===
22 February 2015; 15:45	Adelaide Adrenaline	5–1 (1–0), (3–1), (5–1)	Brisbane Goannas	Ice Arena (Adelaide)

Game reference
Shannon Giebelhaus	Goalies	Keesha Atkins	Referee: Erica Marcshall; Linesmen: Travis Alabaster; Peta Gouden
22 min	Penalties	14 min	Referee: Erica Marcshall; Linesmen: Travis Alabaster; Peta Gouden
31	Shots	28	Referee: Erica Marcshall; Linesmen: Travis Alabaster; Peta Gouden

=== Gold-medal game ===
22 February 2015; 17:15	Melbourne Ice	6–0 (1–0), (3–0), (6–0)	Sydney Sirens	Ice Arena (Adelaide)

Game reference
Shanley Peters	Goalies	Michala Jefferies	Referee: Bill Newbound; Linesmen: Chris Parks; Damian Smith
6 min	Penalties	10 min	Referee: Bill Newbound; Linesmen: Chris Parks; Damian Smith
36	Shots	20	Referee: Bill Newbound; Linesmen: Chris Parks; Damian Smith

== See also ==
- Ice Hockey Australia
- Joan McKowen Memorial Trophy
