= 2015–16 AWIHL season =

- League: Australian Women's Ice Hockey League
- Sport: Ice hockey
- Duration: 24 October 2015 – 24 January 2016
- Games: 12
- Teams: 4

Regular season
- Premiers: Melbourne Ice
- Top scorer: Sharna Godfrey

Joan McKowen Memorial Trophy
- Champions: Melbourne Ice
- Runners-up: Sydney Sirens

AWIHL seasons
- ← 2014–15 2016–17 →

The 2015–16 AWIHL season is the ninth season of the Australian Women's Ice Hockey League. It will run from 24 October 2015 until 24 January 2016.

== League business ==
On Monday, 13 July 2015 it was announced that this season will see changes to the import rules, which were as follows:

1. Anyone that doesn't have Permanent Residency is an import, including New Zealanders.
2. Only 4 imports per roster, and only 2 can play per game.
3. No import goalies.

== Regular season ==
The regular season begins on 24 October 2015 and will run through to 24 January 2016

=== October ===
| Game | Date | Time | Away | Score | Home | Location | Recap |
|---|---|---|---|---|---|---|---|
| 1 | 24 October 2015 | 15:45 | Adelaide Adrenaline | 6 - 5 (SO) | Brisbane Goannas | Boondall | |
| 2 | 24 October 2015 | 17:00 | Sydney Sirens | 4 - 6 | Melbourne Ice | Melbourne | |
| 3 | 25 October 2015 | 08:30 | Adelaide Adrenaline | 4 - 3 (SO) | Brisbane Goannas | Acacia Ridge | |
| 4 | 25 October 2015 | 13:15 | Sydney Sirens | 5 - 7 | Melbourne Ice | Melbourne | |

=== November ===
| Game | Date | Time | Away | Score | Home | Location | Recap |
|---|---|---|---|---|---|---|---|
| 5 | 7 November 2015 | 17:00 | Brisbane Goannas | 3 - 7 | Melbourne Ice | Melbourne | |
| 6 | 7 November 2015 | 17:00 | Adelaide Adrenaline | 4 - 5 (SO) | Sydney Sirens | Canterbury, New South Wales | |
| 7 | 8 November 2015 | 10:30 | Adelaide Adrenaline | 1 - 4 | Sydney Sirens | Canterbury, New South Wales | |
| 8 | 8 November 2015 | 13:15 | Brisbane Goannas | 3 - 6 | Melbourne Ice | Melbourne | |
| 9 | 21 November 2015 | 16:00 | Sydney Sirens | 8 - 2 | Adelaide Adrenaline | Thebarton, South Australia | |
| 10 | 22 November 2015 | 10:00 | Sydney Sirens | 4 - 2 | Adelaide Adrenaline | Thebarton, South Australia | |
| 11 | 28 November 2015 | 15:45 | Melbourne Ice | 4 - 5 (SO) | Brisbane Goannas | Boondall | |
| 12 | 29 November 2015 | 08:30 | Melbourne Ice | 4 - 2 | Brisbane Goannas | Boondall | |

=== December ===
| Game | Date | Time | Away | Score | Home | Location | Recap |
|---|---|---|---|---|---|---|---|
| 13 | 5 December 2015 | 16:00 | Melbourne Ice | 1 - 5 | Adelaide Adrenaline | Thebarton, South Australia | |
| 14 | 5 December 2015 | 17:00 | Brisbane Goannas | 4 - 5 | Sydney Sirens | Canterbury, New South Wales | |
| 15 | 6 December 2015 | 10:00 | Melbourne Ice | 5 - 3 | Adelaide Adrenaline | Thebarton, South Australia | |
| 16 | 6 December 2015 | 10:30 | Brisbane Goannas | 2 - 5 | Sydney Sirens | Canterbury, New South Wales | |

=== January ===
| Game | Date | Time | Away | Score | Home | Location | Recap |
|---|---|---|---|---|---|---|---|
| 17 | 9 January 2016 | 15:45 | Sydney Sirens | 4 - 2 | Brisbane Goannas | Boondall | |
| 18 | 9 January 2016 | 17:00 | Adelaide Adrenaline | 2 - 1 | Melbourne Ice | Melbourne | |
| 19 | 10 January 2016 | 08:30 | Sydney Sirens | 3 - 4 | Brisbane Goannas | Boondall | |
| 20 | 10 January 2016 | 13:15 | Adelaide Adrenaline | 5 - 6 (SO) | Melbourne Ice | Melbourne | |
| 21 | 23 January 2016 | 16:00 | Brisbane Goannas | 2 - 6 | Adelaide Adrenaline | Thebarton, South Australia | |
| 22 | 23 January 2016 | 17:00 | Melbourne Ice | 1 - 7 | Sydney Sirens | Canterbury, New South Wales | |
| 23 | 24 January 2016 | 10:30 | Melbourne Ice | 7 - 6 | Sydney Sirens | Canterbury, New South Wales | |
| 24 | 24 January 2016 | 10:00 | Brisbane Goannas | 0 - 3 | Adelaide Adrenaline | Thebarton, South Australia | |

== Standings ==
Note: GP = Games played; W = Wins; SW = Shootout Wins; SL = Shootout losses; L = Losses; GF = Goals for; GA = Goals against; GDF = Goal differential; PTS = Points

The regular season league standings are as follows:

| Team | GP | W | SW | SL | L | GF | GA | GDF | PTS |
|---|---|---|---|---|---|---|---|---|---|
| Melbourne Ice | 12 | 8 | 1 | 1 | 2 | 56 | 49 | +7 | 27 |
| Sydney Sirens | 12 | 7 | 1 | 0 | 4 | 60 | 42 | +18 | 23 |
| Adelaide Adrenaline | 12 | 3 | 2 | 2 | 5 | 42 | 45 | -3 | 15 |
| Brisbane Goannas | 12 | 1 | 1 | 2 | 8 | 35 | 57 | -22 | 7 |

== Scoring leaders ==
Note: GP = Games played; G = Goals; A = Assists; Pts = Points; PIM = Penalty minutes

| Player | Team | GP | G | A | Pts | PIM |
|---|---|---|---|---|---|---|
| Sharna Godfrey | Sydney Sirens | 12 | 20 | 16 | 36 | 12 |
| Bethanie Kavanagh | Adelaide Adrenaline | 12 | 10 | 19 | 29 | 10 |
| Kath McOnie | Sydney Sirens | 12 | 8 | 15 | 23 | 2 |
| Alivia Del Basso | Melbourne Ice | 10 | 10 | 12 | 22 | 6 |
| Shona Powell | Melbourne Ice | 12 | 10 | 12 | 22 | 12 |
| Carly Rolph | Melbourne Ice | 12 | 10 | 8 | 18 | 26 |
| Diana Glass | Adelaide Adrenaline | 11 | 10 | 6 | 16 | 30 |
| Rosanna Routledge | Brisbane Goannas | 10 | 10 | 5 | 15 | 6 |
| Stephanie Cochrane | Sydney Sirens | 10 | 6 | 8 | 14 | 6 |
| Lucy Parrington | Melbourne Ice | 10 | 4 | 10 | 14 | 6 |

== Leading goaltenders ==
Note: GP = Games played; Mins = Minutes played; W = Wins; L = Losses: OTL = Overtime losses; SL = Shootout losses; GA = Goals Allowed; SO = Shutouts; GAA = Goals against average

| Player | Team | GP | Mins | W | L | GA | SO | Sv% | GAA |
|---|---|---|---|---|---|---|---|---|---|
| Tianna Elaya | Sydney Sirens | 2 | 31 | 2 | 0 | 1 | 0 | 0.938 | 1.45 |
| Claudia Tom | Adelaide Adrenaline | 3 | 123 | 1 | 2 | 7 | 0 | 0.903 | 2.56 |
| Michelle Coonan | Sydney Sirens | 12 | 612 | 8 | 4 | 41 | 0 | 0.868 | 3.01 |
| Jenelle Carson | Melbourne Ice | 6 | 324 | 4 | 2 | 22 | 0 | 0.891 | 3.06 |
| Joanne Phillis | Brisbane Goannas | 10 | 523 | 3 | 6 | 38 | 1 | 0.879 | 3.27 |

== Playoffs ==
=== Bronze Medal Game ===
| 6 February 2016 | v | O'Brien Group Arena |

=== Gold Medal Game ===
| 7 February 2016 | v | O'Brien Group Arena |

== See also ==
- Ice Hockey Australia
- Joan McKowen Memorial Trophy
