= Perth Inferno =

Australian ice hockey club

- City: Perth, Western Australia
- League: Australian Women's Ice Hockey League
- Founded: 2016 (10 years ago)
- Operated: 2016–present
- Home arena: Cockburn Ice Arena
- Colours: Purple, orange
- Owner: Ice Hockey WA
- General manager: Deon Shearer
- Head coach: John Kennedy Jr
- Captain: Georgia McLellan
- Website: Official website

Franchise history
- 2016–2018: WA State Women’s Team
- 2018–present: Perth Inferno

Championships
- Gower Memorial Shield: 1 (2023–24)

The Perth Inferno is an amateur ice hockey team based in Perth, Western Australia. The team is a member of the Australian Women's Ice Hockey League (AWIHL), the highest level of women's ice hockey in Australia. The team was founded by Ice Hockey WA in 2016 as the Western Australian state women's team before adopting the Inferno identity and joining the AWIHL as an expansion team in 2018–19. Their home venue is Cockburn Ice Arena, located in south-west Perth. The Inferno have claimed one Gower Memorial Shield premiership.

== Championships ==
- Joan McKowen Trophy

Champions (0):
Runners-up (1): 2024

- Gower Memorial Shield

Premiers (1): 2024
Runners-up (0):

== Players ==
=== 2019–20 roster ===
In August 2019, the Perth Inferno released the following roster for the 2019–20 AWIHL season. New players to the team included Sydney Fricker (WA Blaze), Heather Hayduk (WA Blaze), Rachel Kogiopoulos, Celeste Milner, Mariam Hall (WA Blaze), Molly Lukowiak and Sara Sammons. Dropped from the roster were Celestine Adams, Keesha Atkins, Taylor Cookson, Katrina Dobo, Melissa Jetten, Ella Licari, Cara Minney-Smith, Shelley Pippo-Giuffre, Courtney Poole, Madison Poole and Tansy Thomas-Bland.

#	Nat	Name	Pos	Acquired	GP	PTS
–	(Australia)	Lesleigh Bower	D	2018	10	5
–	(Canada)	Michelle Clarke-Crumpton	F	2018	12	21
–	(Australia)	Sydney Fricker	G	2019	0	0
–	(Australia)	Miriam Hall	D	2019	9	0
–	(Canada)	Heather Hayduk	F	2019	7	0
–	(Canada)	Sasha Irvine	D	2018	12	2
–	(Australia)	Sasha King	G	2019	12	2
–	(Australia)	Rachel Kogiopoulos	F	2018	3	0
–	(Australia)	Tonii Larpent	D	2018	12	4
–	(Australia)	Bianca Löwenadler	F	2018	5	0
–	(Australia)	Molly Lukowiak	D	2019	8	1
–	(Australia)	Isla Malcolm	F	2018	12	11
–	(Australia)	Liana Njirich	D	2018	12	0
–	(Scotland)	Louise McNab	F	2018	9	3
–	(Australia)	Marina Nottle	F	2018	6	4
–	(Australia)	Sara Sammons	F	2019	8	17
–	(United States)	Elizabeth Scala	F	2018	12	20
–	(Australia)	Nikki Sharp	F	2018	7	3
–	(New Zealand)	Rebecca McMahon	F	2018	7	5
–	(Australia)	Alivia Del Basso	F	2018	4	5
–	(United States)	Nora MacLaine	F	2019	12	23
–	(United States)	Courtney Moulton	F	2018	12	13

== Leadership and coaching ==
Season	Club president	Head coach	Assistant coach
2018–19	Alicia Kelly	Paul Graham	Thomas Boschman
2019–20	Alicia Kelly	Paul Graham	Jason McMahon
2020–21	Season canceled due to COVID-19 pandemic		

== Broadcasting ==
Current:

- Sportscast Australia (2023 - present) - On 24 October 2023, the AWIHL signed an agreement with Sportscast Australia to stream the 2023-24 AWIHL season. Launched as AWIHL.TV, every game of the regular and post-season would be available live and on-demand for free, with no region-locks, through the AWIHl.TV website and YouTube.

Former:

- Clutch.TV (2022-23) - On 22 October 2022, the AWIHL announced a streaming partnership with Australian streaming provider Clutch.TV for worldwide streaming rights for the 2022-23 AWIHL season. Every game of the regular and post-season would be available live and on-demand for free on the Clutch streaming platform. This partnership came to an abrupt end in September 2023, ahead of the new AWIHL season, when Clutch Pty Ltd, who operates Clutch.TV, entered administration and ceased all operations.
- Kayo Sports (2018-22) – The AWIHL signed a broadcasting deal with Fox Sports in 2018 to stream on their Kayo Sports platform, a weekly 'game of the week' and 20-minutes highlight package with commentary and player interviews each round of the 2018-19 AWIHL season. This agreement was extended in the 2019-20 season, but was put on hold during the COVID-19 pandemic, when the AWIHL had to cancel two consecutive seasons.

== See also ==
- Australian Women's Ice Hockey League
- Ice Hockey Australia
- Joan McKowen Memorial Trophy
- Australian Ice Hockey League
- Australian Junior Ice Hockey League
- Jim Brown Trophy
- Goodall Cup
- Ice hockey in Australia
