= Liverpool Catholic Club Ice Rink =

Ice sports complex in Sydney, Australia

- Interactive map of Liverpool Catholic Club Ice Rink
- Location: Liverpool Catholic Club; Corner Joadja and Hoxton Park Roads, Liverpool West; NSW 2170
- Coordinates: 33.928877°S 150.874883°E
- Capacity: 500 (seating)
- Surface: 55 m × 25 m (180 ft × 82 ft)

Construction
- Opened: 1979 (47 years ago)

Tenants
- LCC Saints Ice Hockey Club (1979-present); Sydney Ice Dogs (2009-2016)

Website
- Liverpool Catholic Club Ice Rink

The Liverpool Catholic Club Ice Rink (also known as LCC Sports Complex Liverpool) is an ice sports and public skate centre, built in 1979 and located at the Hoxton Park precinct of Sydney, New South Wales, Australia. It is the home of the LCC Saints Ice Hockey Club, with Junior and Senior Teams and home to LCC Ice Skating Club (LCCISC), producing Olympic and international figure skating athletes. It has previously served as the home ice rink of the Sydney Ice Dogs in the Australian Ice Hockey League until 2017.

== Facilities ==
Facilities at LCC Ice Rink are detailed below:

- 55 m × 25 m (180 ft × 82 ft) ice rink (With nets around the rink)
- Capacity of 500 spectators (both seating and standing)
- Skate hire
- Cafe
- Onsite parking

== Events ==
The rink opened in 2004 and has been the continuous home of the Saints Ice Hockey Club since that time. The club is community based and offers hockey to players of all ages and abilities. Sled hockey is also offered. Between 2009 and 2016, the ice rink annually hosted regular season Australian Ice Hockey League matches involving the Sydney Ice Dogs (originally known as Western Sydney Ice Dogs until 2009) between the months of April and August. In 2016 the Ice Dogs appointed a new general manager, Jason Juba, who bought a change in direction for the organisation. Jason Juba held negotiations with Macquarie Ice Rink in the off-season and the Sydney Ice Dogs agreed to move to Macquarie for the 2017 AIHL season.

== See also ==
- List of ice rinks in Australia
- Sport in New South Wales
