= Cockburn Ice Arena =

Ice sports arena in Perth

- Interactive map of Cockburn Ice Arena
- Address: 401 Progress Drive
- Location: Bibra Lake, City of Cockburn
- Coordinates: 32°06′01″S 115°49′16″E
- Owner: Cockburn Ice Arena Pty Ltd (The Barrett family - Mr Tom and Mrs Joy Barrett)
- Operator: Cockburn Ice Arena Pty Ltd (Calandra Barrett)
- Type: Ice rink
- Surface: 60m x 28m
- Field size: 10,000m2
- Public transit: 520 bus route

Construction
- Built: 2015 (11 years ago)
- Opened: 24 October 2015
- Main contractor: PROJECT Constructions

Tenant
- Perth Inferno (2016–present)

Website
- www.cockburnicearena.com.au

Cockburn Ice Arena is an ice sports and ice skating centre, located in the Bibra Lake suburb of the City of Cockburn, Perth. It hosts a number of ice hockey and curling games, including Perth Inferno and IHWA Premiere League games. The venue offers a wide variety of activities including ice skating lessons, birthday parties, and public skating sessions.

== See also ==
- List of ice rinks in Australia
- Australian Women's Ice Hockey League
- Perth Inferno
