= Brisbane Goannas =

Australian women's ice hockey league

- City: (Australia) Brisbane, Queensland
- League: Australian Women's Ice Hockey League
- Founded: 2006
- Home arena: Ice World Boondall
- Colours: (2006-2009) (2009-present)
- Owner: Ice Hockey Queensland
- Head coach: (Canada) Terry Kiliwnik
- Captain: (Australia) Veronica Watson

Franchise history
- 2005–present: Brisbane Goannas

Championships
- Regular season titles: 0
- AWIHL Championships: 0

The Brisbane Goannas are in the Australian Women's Ice Hockey League. The team is based in Brisbane, Queensland, Australia. The Goannas Women’s Ice Hockey Club (GWIHC) is a non-profit incorporated association, governed by a volunteer management committee, focusing on the development of female players of all abilities and ages. Jad Daley is the President of the committee. Ice World Boondall is their home arena. The team's charity is Australian Prostate Cancer Research Centre – Queensland.

== History ==
The Brisbane Goannas were one of the four founding teams in the Australian Women's Ice Hockey League, which began in 2007.

== Roster ==
2016-2017 Season

#	Nat	Name	Pos	Date of birth	Acquired	Birthplace
4	(Australia)	Veronica Watson	D	30 April 1989	2014	U.S.A
12	(New Zealand)	Emma Gray	F	17 September 1982	2014	New Zealand
16	(Australia)	Rosie Routledge	F	11 July 1989	2014	Canada
20	(Australia)	Tracy Hocutt	D	11 October 1974	2009	U.S.A
7	(Australia)	Georgia Giblin	F	23 May 1985	2014	Australia
14	(Australia)	Kelly Costa	D	23 April 1983	2009	Canada
21	(Australia)	Alexandra MacDonald	F	18 April 1997	2011	Australia
23	(Australia)	Abi Brown	F	23 October 2001	2015	Australia
96	(Australia)	Anna Santilli	F	1 March 1996	2011	Australia
6	(Australia)	Tiffany Venning	D	3 October 1996	2011	Australia
9	(Australia)	Brittany Gibbs	F	9 August 1988	2013	U.S.A
18	(Australia)	Christina Badgely	F	21 August 1986	2013	Canada
55	(Australia)	Lindsey Kiliwnik	F	10 November 2002	2016	Canada
5	(Australia)	Charlotte Kelly	F	20 May 1998	2015	Australia
30	(Australia)	Ashleigh Brown	G	15 April 1992	2016	Australia
73	(Australia)	Imogen Perry	G	17 July 2000	2016	Australia

=== Captains ===
- 2011-12 Jemma Wallace (C), Melinda White (A), Laura Morris (A)
- 2012-13 Jemma Wallace (C), Melinda White (A), Tracy Hocutt (A)
- 2013-14 Jemma Wallace (C), Megan Gilchrist (A),
- 2014-15 Megan Herlihey (C), Megan Gilchrist (A), Brittany Gibbs (A)
- 2015-16 Veronica Watson (C), Kelly Costa (A)
- 2016-17 Veronica Waston (C), Kelly Costa (A), Rosie Routledge (A)
- 2017-18 Veronica Waston (C), Kelly Costa (A), Brittany Gibbs (A)
