= Ice World Boondall =

Public ice rink in Queensland, Australia

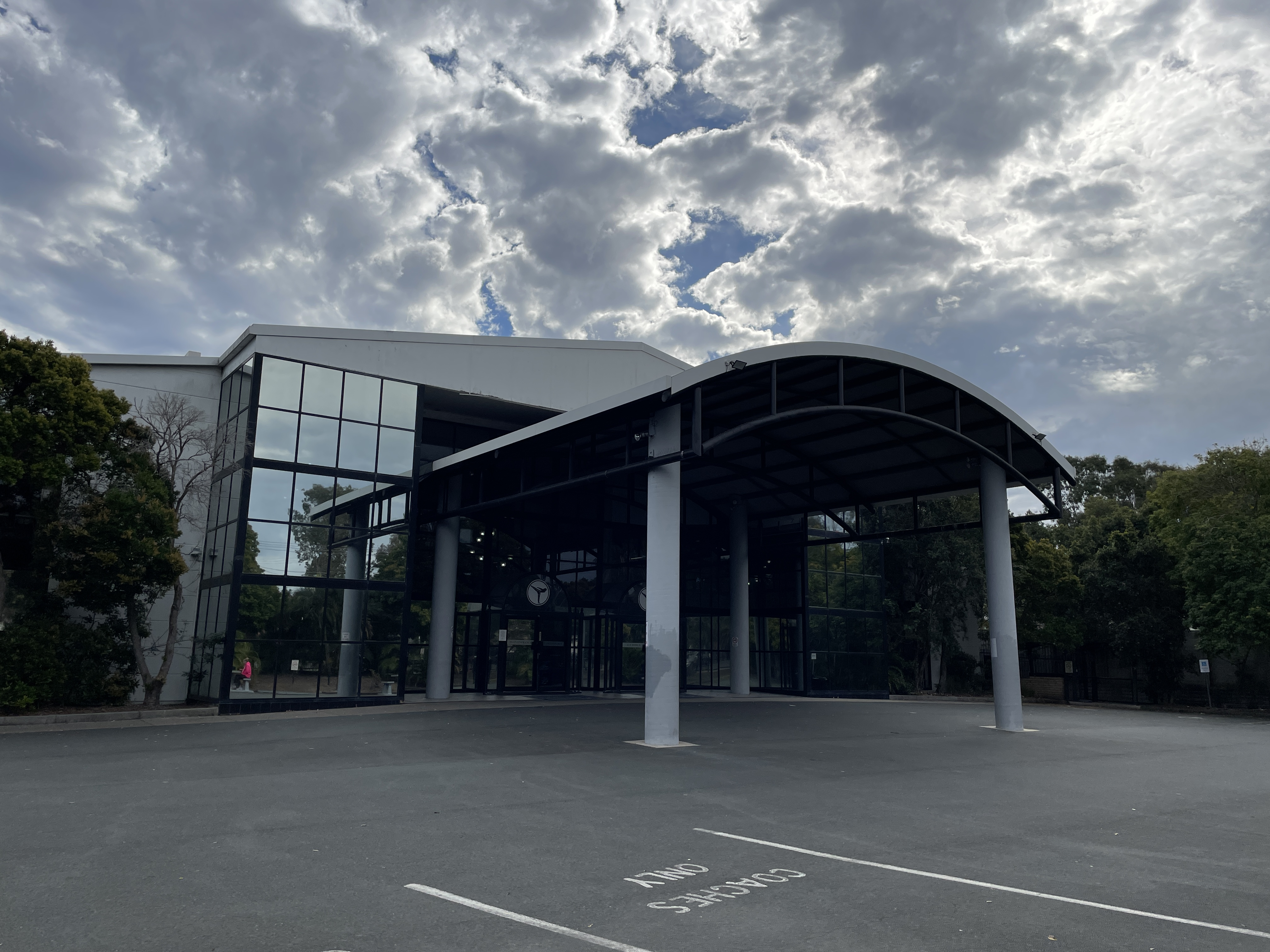
- Interactive map of Ice World Boondall
- Address: 2304 Sandgate Road, Boondall QLD 4034
- Coordinates: 27.3403°S 153.05833°E

Tenants
- Brisbane Blitz (AJIHL) (2015–present); Brisbane Goannas (AWIHL) (2006–present); Brisbane Lightning (AIHL) (2022-present); Duke Trophy

Website
- www.iceworld.com.au

Iceworld Boondall is an ice sports and public ice skating centre, in Boondall located approximately 20 kilometres (12 mi) north of the Brisbane CBD in Queensland, Australia. It hosts a number of major ice hockey games, including Australian Women's Ice Hockey League games. The venue offers a wide variety of activities including ice skating lessons, birthday parties, figure skating, speed skating, curling, synchronised skating, public skating sessions, and it is also the home venue of the Brisbane Goannas. The venue has been operating in Brisbane for over 30 years. Iceworld Boondall is also a host venue for the Duke Trophy, an annual inter-state short track speed skating competition in Australia.

== See also ==
- List of ice rinks in Australia
- Australian Women's Ice Hockey League
- Duke Trophy
