= 2015 AIHL season =

- League: Australian Ice Hockey League
- Sport: Ice hockey
- Duration: 25 April 2015 – 30 August 2015

Regular season
- H Newman Reid Trophy: Newcastle North Stars (4th title)
- Season MVP: Geordie Wudrick (North Stars)
- Top scorer: Geordie Wudrick (91 points) (North Stars)

Goodall Cup
- Champions: Newcastle North Stars
- Runners-up: Melbourne Ice
- Finals MVP: Geordie Wudrick (North Stars)

AIHL seasons
- ← 2014 2016 →

The 2015 AIHL season was the 16th season of the Australian Ice Hockey League (AIHL). It ran from 25 April 2015, until 23 August 2015, with the Goodall Cup finals following on 29 and 30 August. The Newcastle North Stars won both the H Newman Reid Trophy for finishing first in the regular season, and the Goodall Cup after defeating the Melbourne Ice in the final.

== Teams ==
In 2015 the AIHL had 8 teams competing in the league.

2015 AIHL teams
| Team | City | Arena | Head Coach | Captain |
|---|---|---|---|---|
| Adelaide Adrenaline | (South Australia) Adelaide | IceArenA | (Australia) Trevor Walsh | (Australia) Greg Oddy |
| CBR Brave | (Australian Capital Territory) Canberra | Phillip Ice Skating Centre | (Australia) Brad Hunt | (Australia) Mark Rummukainen |
| Melbourne Ice | (Victoria (state)) Melbourne | Medibank Icehouse | (Australia) Brent Laver | (Australia) Lliam Webster |
| Melbourne Mustangs | (Victoria (state)) Melbourne | Medibank Icehouse | (Australia) Brad Vigon | (Australia) Sean Jones |
| Newcastle North Stars | (New South Wales) Newcastle | Hunter Ice Skating Stadium | (Australia) Andrew Petrie | (Australia) Robert Malloy |
| Perth Thunder | (Western Australia) Perth | Perth Ice Arena | (Australia) Dave Kenway | (Australia) Samuel Wilson |
| Sydney Bears | (New South Wales) Penrith | Penrith Ice Palace | (Australia) Vladimir Rubes | (Australia) Michael Schlamp |
| Sydney Ice Dogs | (New South Wales) Sydney | Liverpool Catholic Club Ice Rink | (Denmark) Anders Jespersen | (Australia) Brian Funes |

== League business ==
The Gold Coast Blue Tongues licence expired two years after they were suspended from the AIHL due to their inability to organise a new ice rink. In response, the league has started making enquiries in Brisbane to gauge interest in placing a team back in the city. The Central Coast Rhinos who played in the AIHL between 2005 and 2008 applied to re-enter the league at the 2014 Annual General Meeting. Their application however was rejected for undisclosed reasons. The Sydney Bears announced that they were moving from the Sydney Ice Arena to the Penrith Ice Palace. The Bears previously played at the Ice Palace from 2007 to 2011 before relocating to the Ice Arena. The team's move comes after the Ice Arena's land was approved for redevelopment. In January 2015, the Sydney Ice Dogs announced a deal with DGB Media Group to produce a highlights program for their home games which will be aired on the Television Sydney station. On 4 February, the Canberra Institute of Technology announced that they had signed on with the CBR Brave as a major sponsor with a deal that would include the Institutes logo on the team jerseys and their students working with the players as part of their training. The Brave also signed Anytime Fitness as a sleeve sponsor, Benchmarc Financial Group as a pants sponsor and Smoque restaurant as the club's official post match partner. In April 2015, the Sydney Ice Dogs signed Southern Cross Group Services as a new sponsor for the club. In March the league revealed new branding which included a new logo and slogan “Fast, Fierce, Full-on”. The new logo which is designed to represent the Australian Commonwealth star and a blade of an ice hockey stick was developed by Coordinate. The CBR Brave announced that they had established a junior affiliate club, known as the Junior Brave, in conjunction with Ice Hockey ACT to compete in the NSW Midget Ice Hockey League. On 17 March Hards Transport signed a deal with the Adelaide Adrenaline to become the club's naming rights sponsor. In April the Sydney Bears signed a deal with TGI Fridays Macquarie Centre restaurant to sponsor the bar located at the Penrith Ice Palace. They also announced a partnership with apparel company Ryzer for 2015 with the company supplying the home and away uniforms. The league changed one rule for the 2015 season, adopting the hybrid icing rule to allow players to better prepare for International Ice Hockey Federation competitions and mitigate risks associated with end wall collisions.

In May, watchmakers Haigh & Hastings signed a deal with the AIHL to become a sponsor for the 2015 season, expanding their activity in the league with the company already a major sponsor of the Perth Thunder. Also in May the Perth Thunder announced Ryan Laurel Resourcing, Sandalford Wines and Smartclub as a new sponsors of the club and the CBR Brave changed their official post match partner from Smoque restaurant to the Hellenic Club's Trattoria restaurant in order to accommodate the number of fans. In July, the league signed a deal with TGI Fridays Australia which saw them named as the official restaurant of the AIHL. The deal includes TGI Fridays showing the Fox AIHL Games of the Week and the Melbourne Central restaurant hosting the official after part of the 2015 playoffs. Also in July the Perth Thunder announced that Zarraffa's Coffee and Nova 93.7 had signed on with the club as sponsors.

=== Exhibition games ===
The first exhibition game was held on 21 March between the Adelaide Adrenaline and an Ice Hockey South Australia A-Grade All Stars team at the Adelaide Ice Arena. The Adrenaline defeated the All Stars 5–1. In April 2015 the Perth Thunder competed in a three-game exhibition series against the New Zealand national team at the Perth Ice Arena. The three games were held as part of the New Zealand team's preparation for the 2015 IIHF World Championship Division II Group B tournament. The Thunder won the series two games to one, winning the opening two games before being beaten in the third. The Wilson Cup tournament was held for the second year in a row and again featured all three New South Wales based clubs. The number of games was increased from four to seven with a double round-robin being held before a final between the two top ranked teams. The Sydney Bears finished first in the round robin, winning three of their four games, and were drawn against the Newcastle North Stars in the final. The North Stars won the final 4–3, claiming their first Wilson Cup title. On 18 April the Melbourne Ice and Melbourne Mustangs competed in a preseason game at the Medibank Icehouse with the Mustangs winning the game 9–1.

=== Personnel changes ===
In September 2014, the Sydney Ice Dogs announced that Andrew Petrie had resigned as head coach. A week later the Newcastle North Stars announced that they had signed Petrie as head coach for the 2015 season. Petrie replaced Garry Doré who stepped down from the position to focus on his role as general manager. In December 2014, the Melbourne Ice announced their new committee for 2015. Bernie O'Brien was elected president, replacing Emma Poynton, former Ice goaltender Stuart Denman was elected vice president, Erin Tempest elected secretary and Virginia Fitzwater was elected treasurer. Chris Caveny, Nigel Sherwin, Shan Humphries and Alexandra McKnight were also added to the committee, while Candace Smith and Jo Luciania stepped down from their positions. The Melbourne Mustangs announced that assistant coach Mark Connolly had stepped down from his position. He was replaced by current head coach of the Melbourne Whalers and Saints-Monarchs Premier A team, Michael Flaherty. In January 2015, the Adelaide Adrenaline announced that general manager Ross Noga had resigned from his position due to time constraints following a change in career. Also in January the CBR Brave announced that they had signed former player Brad Hunt as head coach, replacing Matti Luoma who relocated to Perth, Western Australia. In March 2015, both the Sydney Ice Dogs and the Perth Thunder announced the appointment of new head coaches. The Sydney Ice Dogs signed Oman national team head coach Anders Jespersen to replace Andrew Petrie who resigned in September 2014 to join the North Stars. The Thunder promoted assistant coach Dave Kenway to the head coach position, replacing Stan Scott who returns to his general manager position. Also in March, it was revealed that the Sydney Bears had hired former Sydney Ice Dogs head coach Ron Kuprowsky as an assistant to head coach Vladimir Rubes. In June, Sydney Ice Dogs head coach Anders Jespersen left the club for unknown reasons and was replaced by Sydney Bears player Mario Passarelli. The head coach position was then handed to Tim Flynn after Passarelli opted to play for the Ice Dogs as a skater. In July, the CBR Brave announced that Brad Hunt had been replaced as head coach by goaltender Josh Unice on an interim basis. The club also announced that defenceman Aaron Clayworth would join the coaching panel as an assistant.

=== Player transfers ===
Interclub transfers

| Nat | Player | Previous team | New team | Ref |
|---|---|---|---|---|
| (Australia) | Paul Baranzelli | Sydney Ice Dogs | Melbourne Ice | |
| (Australia) | Mitch Bye | Sydney Ice Dogs | Newcastle North Stars | |
| (Australia) | David Dunwoodie | Sydney Ice Dogs | CBR Brave | |
| (Australia) | Sean Hamilton | Melbourne Ice | Sydney Ice Dogs | |
| (Australia) | Adam Kimbley | Sydney Bears | Sydney Ice Dogs | |
| (Australia) | Tyler Kubara | Sydney Ice Dogs | CBR Brave | |
| (Australia) | Robert Malloy | Sydney Ice Dogs | Newcastle North Stars | |
| (Australia) | Lukas Manco | Sydney Bears | Sydney Ice Dogs | |
| (Australia) | Brendan Oakes | Melbourne Mustangs | Melbourne Ice | |
| (Australia) | Mario Passarelli | Sydney Bears | Sydney Ice Dogs | |
| (Australia) | Jarrod Smith | Sydney Bears | Sydney Ice Dogs | |
| (Australia) | Shane Southwood | Sydney Ice Dogs | Newcastle North Stars | |
| (Australia) | Alec Stephenson | Sydney Bears | Sydney Ice Dogs | |
| (Australia) | Richard Tesarik | Sydney Ice Dogs | Sydney Bears | |
| (United Kingdom) | Patrick Ward | Sydney Ice Dogs | Sydney Bears | |

Retirements

| Nat | Player | Team | New role | Ref |
|---|---|---|---|---|
| (United Kingdom) | Richard Ashton | Melbourne Ice | — | |
| (Australia) | Brad Hunt | CBR Brave | Head coach of CBR Brave | |
| (Australia) | Ray Sheffield | Newcastle North Stars | Assistant coach at Newcastle North Stars | |

New signings

| Nat | Player | Previous team | New team | Ref |
|---|---|---|---|---|
| (United States) | Drew Akins | Huntsville Havoc | Melbourne Mustangs | |
| (Canada) | Strat Allen | No team | Sydney Ice Dogs | |
| (Canada) | Cory Banfield | Pensacola Ice Flyers | Melbourne Mustangs | |
| (Australia) | Alan Becken | Sydney Heat | Sydney Bears | |
| (Australia) | Steve Best | Adelaide Redwings | Adelaide Adrenaline | |
| (United Kingdom) | Jonathan Boxill | Nottingham Panthers | Adelaide Adrenaline | |
| (Australia) | Tyson Boyd | Adelaide Blackhawks | Adelaide Adrenaline | |
| (Australia) | Jordan Brunt | No team | CBR Brave | |
| (Australia) | Dale Burgess | Penrith Raptors | Sydney Bears | |
| (Australia) | Jake Burgess | Sydney Wolf Pack | Sydney Ice Dogs | |
| (Australia) | Jamie Campbell | West Coast Lightning | Perth Thunder | |
| (Australia) | Ellesse Carini | Reach Rebels | Sydney Bears | |
| (Australia) | Taras Cheprakov | Melbourne Whalers | Melbourne Ice | |
| (Australia) | Tyerell Clare | No team | Sydney Bears | |
| (Australia) | Scott Clemie | West Auckland Admirals | Sydney Ice Dogs | |
| (United States) | Tommy Cooney | Arizona State University | Sydney Bears | |
| (Canada) | Luc Daigneault | No team | Perth Thunder | |
| (Canada) | Dayne Davis | No team | Newcastle North Stars | |
| (Australia) | Cassian Delsar | Adelaide Tigers | Melbourne Ice | |
| (Canada) | Peter Di Salvo | Mississippi Riverkings | Perth Thunder | |
| (Australia) | James Downie | CIHA Voyageurs Bantam AAA | Sydney Bears | |
| (Australia) | Andrew Erzen | No team | Melbourne Ice | |
| (Australia) | Ryan Foll | Melbourne Whalers | Adelaide Adrenaline | |
| (Australia) | David Foster | Melbourne Glaciers | Melbourne Ice | |
| (Australia) | Charles Frazer | Newcastle North Stars ECSL | Sydney Bears | |
| (Australia) | Nikolaos French | Melbourne Whalers | Melbourne Ice | |
| (Canada) | Kelly Geoffrey | No team | CBR Brave | |
| (United States) | Matt Grogan | No team | Sydney Ice Dogs | |
| (Canada) | Tyler Grove | No team | Adelaide Adrenaline | |
| (United States) | Mark Guggenberger | Fort Wayne Komets | Perth Thunder | |
| (United States) | Joseph Harcharik | Orlik Opole | Sydney Bears | |
| (Hungary) | Dávid Harmati | No team | Sydney Ice Dogs | |
| (Australia) | Luke Harding | Adelaide Blackhawks | Adelaide Adrenaline | |
| (Canada) | Kevin Harvey | Rapid City Rush | Sydney Ice Dogs | |
| (Australia) | Jack Hayes | Melbourne Glaciers | Melbourne Mustangs | |
| (Canada) | Kory Helowka | Osby IK | Adelaide Adrenaline | |
| (Australia) | Mackenzie Hill | Melbourne Whalers | Melbourne Ice | |
| (United States) | Alex Hudson | Peoria Rivermen | Perth Thunder | |
| (Czech Republic) | Kamil Jarina | No team | Sydney Bears | |
| (Canada) | Luke Judson | Bakersfield Condors | Perth Thunder | |
| (Finland) | Toni Kluuskeri | Corsaires de Dunkerque | Perth Thunder | |
| (Australia) | Jackson Knott | Blueline Bombers | Sydney Ice Dogs | |
| (Australia) | Jake Knott | Blueline Bombers | Sydney Ice Dogs | |
| (Canada) | Paul Kurceba | Okotoks Drillers | Melbourne Ice | |
| (Czech Republic) | Tomas Landa | HC Risuty | Sydney Bears | |
| (Canada) | Alex Leclerc | Sherbrooke Cougars | Melbourne Ice | |
| (Australia) | Ilman Lee | Blueline Bombers | Sydney Ice Dogs | |
| (Australia) | Lenny Lee | Melbourne Glaciers | Melbourne Ice | |
| (Australia) | Mitchell Levitt | No team | Perth Thunder | |
| (Australia) | Jayden Lewis | Meaford Knights | CBR Brave | |
| (Australia) | Lyndon Lodge | West Coast Lightning | Perth Thunder | |
| (Australia) | James Marino | ECSL Sting | Sydney Ice Dogs | |
| (Australia) | Tomas Manco | No team | CBR Brave | |
| (Canada) | Kyle Mariani | Laval Prédateurs | CBR Brave | |
| (Australia) | Brayden Martin | Melbourne Glaciers | Melbourne Ice | |
| (Australia) | Mark McCann | Cockburn Blackhawks | Perth Thunder | |
| (Australia) | Jackson McCoy | No team | Melbourne Mustangs | |
| (Australia) | Lachlan McKenzie | Penrith Raptors | Sydney Bears | |
| (United States) | Luke Moffatt | Storhamar Dragons | Newcastle North Stars | |
| (Australia) | Nicholas Novysedlak | No team | Melbourne Ice | |
| (Czech Republic) | Aleš Padělek | HC Rebel Havlíčkův Brod | Sydney Bears | |
| (Australia) | Ben Pagett | No team | CBR Brave | |
| (United States) | Mario Passarelli | No team | Sydney Bears | |
| (Australia) | Daniel Pataky | Reach Rebels | Sydney Ice Dogs | |
| (Italy) | Nicola Pau | Adelaide Redwings | Adelaide Adrenaline | |
| (Canada) | Jordan Peddle | No team | CBR Brave | |
| (Canada) | Scott Pitt | Braehead Clan | CBR Brave | |
| (Australia) | Alastair Punler | West Coast Lightning | Perth Thunder | |
| (Australia) | Robbie Rama | Melbourne Whalers | Melbourne Mustangs | |
| (Australia) | Ryan Remillard | Adelaide Falcons | Adelaide Adrenaline | |
| (Australia) | Joel Rhodes | Penrith Raptors | Sydney Ice Dogs | |
| (Czech Republic) | Jan Safar | Fayetteville FireAntz | Newcastle North Stars | |
| (Australia) | Tomas Sak | Cockburn Blackhawks | Perth Thunder | |
| (Australia) | Charlie Smart | West Coast Lightning | Adelaide Adrenaline | |
| (Australia) | Cameron Smith | Sydney Heat | Sydney Ice Dogs | |
| (Australia) | Kane Spence | ECSL Sting | Sydney Ice Dogs | |
| (United States) | Ryan Strayer | Southern Stampede | Sydney Ice Dogs | |
| (Australia) | Corey Stringer | Melbourne Glaciers | Melbourne Mustangs | |
| (Canada) | Scott Swiston | University of Alberta Augustana | Newcastle North Stars | |
| (Australia) | Alexandre Tetreault | No team | CBR Brave | |
| (Australia) | Aleksi Toivonen | HCIK | CBR Brave | |
| (United States) | Josh Unice | Sheffield Steelers | CBR Brave | |
| (Estonia) | Vadim Virjassov | No team | Melbourne Mustangs | |
| (Australia) | Andrew White | No team | Adelaide Adrenaline | |
| (Australia) | Daniel Wilkinson | West Coast Lightning | Perth Thunder | |
| (Canada) | Geordie Wudrick | Louisiana IceGators | Newcastle North Stars | |
| (Australia) | Luke Zvonicek | Blueline Bombers | Sydney Bears | |

Players lost

| Nat | Player | Previous team | New team | Ref |
|---|---|---|---|---|
| (Australia) | Matthew Anderson | Melbourne Mustangs | No team | |
| (Australia) | Brendan Ayton | Sydney Bears | No team | |
| (Australia) | Matthew Ayton | Sydney Bears | No team | |
| (Australia) | Sonny Bal | Melbourne Ice | No team | |
| (Canada) | Simon Barg | Sydney Ice Dogs | No team | |
| (Australia) | David Bell | CBR Brave | No team | |
| (Australia) | Slavomir Boris | Sydney Bears | No team | |
| (Australia) | Dylan Burgess | Sydney Ice Dogs | No team | |
| (Australia) | Blake Cameron | CBR Brave | No team | |
| (Canada) | David Chubb | Adelaide Adrenaline | No team | |
| (Australia) | Nick Clark | Adelaide Adrenaline | No team | |
| (Canada) | John Clewlow | Sydney Ice Dogs | Fayetteville FireAntz | |
| (Australia) | Billy Cliff | Sydney Ice Dogs | No team | |
| (Australia) | Darren Cope | CBR Brave | No team | |
| (Canada) | Scott Corbett | Melbourne Ice | No team | |
| (Canada) | Cody Danberg | Newcastle North Stars | No team | |
| (United States) | Ben DiMarco | Sydney Bears | Skautafélag Akureyrar | |
| (Canada) | Mathieu Dugas | Perth Thunder | Sorel-Tracy Éperviers | |
| (Australia) | Ted Fabijan | Adelaide Adrenaline | Melbourne Whalers | |
| (Canada) | Justin Fox | Perth Thunder | Quad City Mallards | |
| (Australia) | Adam Geric | Newcastle North Stars | No team | |
| (Australia) | Jordan Grover | Perth Thunder | No team | |
| (Australia) | Joshua Hansen | Newcastle North Stars | Newcastle North Stars ECSL | |
| (Canada) | Jeff Harvey | CBR Brave | No team | |
| (Australia) | Alexander Hall | Melbourne Mustangs | No team | |
| (Australia) | Colby Hauser | Perth Thunder | No team | |
| (Australia) | Ross Howell | Melbourne Ice | No team | |
| (New Zealand) | Charlie Huber | Adelaide Adrenaline | No team | |
| (Sweden) | Gustaf Huth | Melbourne Ice | Hammarby Hockey | |
| (Australia) | James Keane | Adelaide Adrenaline | No team | |
| (Finland) | Anton Kokkonen | CBR Brave | TuTo | |
| (Australia) | Simon Kudla | Perth Thunder | No team | |
| (Czech Republic) | Martin Kutek | Melbourne Mustangs | No team | |
| (Australia) | Samuel Lammert | Newcastle North Stars | Newcastle North Stars ECSL | |
| (Australia) | Paul Lazzarotto | Melbourne Ice | Melbourne Whalers | |
| (Australia) | Matthew Lehoczky | CBR Brave | No team | |
| (Sweden) | Måns Lindgren | Adelaide Adrenaline | Piteå HC J20 | |
| (Canada) | Brett Liscomb | Adelaide Adrenaline | Danbury Whalers | |
| (United States) | Dane Ludolph | Sydney Bears | No team | |
| (Australia) | David Manning | Adelaide Adrenaline | IFK Ore | |
| (Canada) | Harrison May | Newcastle North Stars | No team | |
| (Australia) | Joel McFadden | Sydney Bears | Sydney Heat | |
| (Canada) | Eric McKenna | Sydney Ice Dogs | Kowloon Warriors | |
| (Australia) | Christopher McPhail | CBR Brave | No team | |
| (United States) | Matt Monaghan | Sydney Ice Dogs | No team | |
| (Canada) | Carter Moore | Sydney Ice Dogs | No team | |
| (Australia) | Adrian Nash | Melbourne Mustangs | No team | |
| (Australia) | Brett Nelson-Bond | Sydney Bears | No team | |
| (Finland) | Aku Nevalainen | Perth Thunder | HC Giants | |
| (Australia) | Tim Newmark | Sydney Bears | Framingham State University | |
| (Sweden) | Timothy Noting | Sydney Ice Dogs | IFK Österåker | |
| (Canada) | Mathieu Ouellette | CBR Brave | No team | |
| (Sweden) | Daniel Palmkvist | Sydney Bears | Berkshire Battalion | |
| (Australia) | Dean Peterson | Adelaide Adrenaline | No team | |
| (Finland) | Petri Pitkänen | CBR Brave | KeuPa HT | |
| (Australia) | Nicholas Quirk-Orford | Newcastle North Stars | Newcastle North Stars ECSL | |
| (Australia) | Shai Rabinowitz | CBR Brave | No team | |
| (Finland) | Kim Ranta-Aho | Perth Thunder | HC Giants | |
| (Australia) | Troy Robertson | Melbourne Mustangs | No team | |
| (Australia) | Cameron Rose | Sydney Ice Dogs | No team | |
| (Canada) | Jeff Smith | Melbourne Ice | Braehead Clan | |
| (Australia) | Mark Smith | Melbourne Ice | No team | |
| (Australia) | Daniel Spina | Sydney Ice Dogs | Blueline Bombers | |
| (Canada) | Sean Hamilton Steen | Sydney Bears | Swan Lake Cougars | |
| (Canada) | Stuart Stefan | Perth Thunder | Huntsville Havoc | |
| (Australia) | Brenden Stobbs | Sydney Bears | Sydney Heat | |
| (Finland) | Niko Suoraniemi | Adelaide Adrenaline | Orlik Opole | |
| (Australia) | Daniel Szalinski | Melbourne Ice | No team | |
| (Australia) | Darren Taylor | CBR Brave | No team | |
| (Australia) | Matt Taylor | Newcastle North Stars | No team | |
| (Australia) | Shaun Tobin | Perth Thunder | College of St. Scholastica | |
| (United States) | Corey Toy | Perth Thunder | Fayetteville FireAntz | |
| (Canada) | Derek Walker | CBR Brave | No team | |
| (Canada) | Corey Wilkie | CBR Brave | Ste. Anne Aces | |
| (United Kingdom) | Michael Will | Adelaide Adrenaline | Cardiff Devils | |
| (Canada) | Rob Willis | Sydney Bears | No team | |
| (Canada) | Chris Wilson | Newcastle North Stars | Louisiana IceGators | |
| (United States) | Jack Wolgemuth | Melbourne Mustangs | No team | |

== Regular season ==
The regular season started on 25 April 2015 and ran through to 23 August 2015 before the top four teams compete in the Goodall Cup playoff series. In February 2015 it was announced that the Sydney Bears and Sydney Ice Dogs had moved some of their home games to Canberra. The Sydney Bears home game against the CBR Brave on 20 June had to be moved due to the Penrith Ice Palace being unavailable for the game. The Sydney Ice Dogs moved both their 1 and 22 August home games against the Brave to Canberra for undisclosed reasons. The Ice Dogs also moved their 23 May home game in Liverpool against the Newcastle North Stars to 14 June at the Hunter Ice Skating Stadium in Newcastle. On 23 May the Brave hosted the Adelaide Adrenaline in the inaugural beyondblue cup at the Phillip Ice Skating Centre. The regular season game was held to rais awareness for the beyondblue charity and was won by the Brave 8–2. On 20 June the Perth Thunder's regular season match against the Melbourne Mustangs was held at the Perth Arena as a pre-game event to the Canada v USA Ice Hockey Classic match. The Thunder defeated the Mustangs 4–3 in front of a crowd of 2,000. On 28 July 2015 the league fined the Sydney Ice Dogs $500 and three competition points for multiple breaches of the AIHL by-law 4. The by-law requires a team to travel with at least 15 players unless an exemption has been granted. The Ice Dogs first breached the by-law on 4 July and received a written warning and then again breached it on 25 and 26 July, attracting the monetary fine and loss of competition points. The Ice Dogs, who at the time of the fine only had two competition points, revert to zero points and can not gain any further points until they have accumulated the points they have forfeited.

The Newcastle North Stars won the H Newman Reid Trophy after finishing first in the regular season with 63 points. Following the playoffs the AIHL announced the winners of the 2015 awards. Newcastle North Stars Geordie Wudrick and Jan Safar won the Most Valuable Player and Defenceman of the Year respectively, Kamil Jarina of the Sydney Bears won the Goaltender of the Year, Perth Thunder's Kieran Webster was named Rookie of the Year and Dave Kenway Coach of the Year, and the Skater's Network Local Player of the Year was won by Wehebe Darge of the Adelaide Adrenaline.

=== April ===
| Game | Date | Time | Away | Score | Home | Location | Attendance | Recap |
|---|---|---|---|---|---|---|---|---|
| 1 | 25 April | 17:00 | Sydney Ice Dogs | 1–7 | Melbourne Ice | Melbourne | | |
| 2 | 25 April | 17:00 | Adelaide Adrenaline | 4–6 | Newcastle North Stars | Newcastle | | |
| 3 | 25 April | 17:30 | Sydney Bears | 2–4 | CBR Brave | Canberra | | |
| 4 | 26 April | 16:00 | Sydney Ice Dogs | 0–13 | Melbourne Mustangs | Melbourne | | |
| 5 | 26 April | 17:00 | Adelaide Adrenaline | 5–3 | Sydney Bears | Penrith | 300 | |
| 6 | 26 April | 17:00 | CBR Brave | 4–7 | Newcastle North Stars | Newcastle | | |
| 7 | 30 April | 20:00 | Melbourne Ice | 2–1 | Melbourne Mustangs | Melbourne | 1400 | |

=== May ===
| Game | Date | Time | Away | Score | Home | Location | Attendance | Recap |
|---|---|---|---|---|---|---|---|---|
| 8 | 2 May | 17:00 | Newcastle North Stars | 4–3 | Melbourne Mustangs | Melbourne | 500 | |
| 9 | 2 May | 17:00 | Perth Thunder | 4–2 | Sydney Bears | Penrith | | |
| 10 | 2 May | 17:30 | Adelaide Adrenaline | 3–5 | CBR Brave | Canberra | | |
| 11 | 3 May | 16:00 | Newcastle North Stars | 4–2 | Melbourne Ice | Melbourne | | |
| 12 | 3 May | 17:00 | Adelaide Adrenaline | 3–1 | Sydney Bears | Penrith | | |
| 13 | 3 May | 17:00 | Perth Thunder | 4–0 | Sydney Ice Dogs | Liverpool | | |
| 14 | 9 May | 16:30 | CBR Brave | 3–4 | Perth Thunder | Perth | | |
| 15 | 9 May | 16:30 | Sydney Bears | 0–2 | Adelaide Adrenaline | Adelaide | | |
| 16 | 9 May | 17:00 | Melbourne Ice | 4 – 3 (SO) | Newcastle North Stars | Newcastle | | |
| 17 | 10 May | 15:30 | Sydney Bears | 3–1 | Adelaide Adrenaline | Adelaide | | |
| 18 | 10 May | 16:30 | CBR Brave | 1–4 | Perth Thunder | Perth | | |
| 19 | 10 May | 17:00 | Melbourne Ice | 5–1 | Sydney Ice Dogs | Liverpool | | |
| 20 | 16 May | 17:00 | Adelaide Adrenaline | 4–2 | Melbourne Ice | Melbourne | | |
| 21 | 16 May | 17:00 | Perth Thunder | 3–2 | Newcastle North Stars | Newcastle | | |
| 22 | 16 May | 17:00 | Sydney Ice Dogs | 2–7 | Sydney Bears | Penrith | | |
| 23 | 16 May | 17:30 | Melbourne Mustangs | 4–5 | CBR Brave | Canberra | | |
| 24 | 17 May | 16:00 | Adelaide Adrenaline | 4 – 5 (SO) | Melbourne Ice | Melbourne | | |
| 25 | 17 May | 17:00 | Melbourne Mustangs | 4 – 3 (SO) | CBR Brave | Canberra | | |
| 26 | 17 May | 17:00 | Sydney Bears | 3–8 | Newcastle North Stars | Newcastle | | |
| 27 | 17 May | 17:00 | Perth Thunder | 5–0 | Sydney Ice Dogs | Liverpool | | |
| 28 | 23 May | 16:30 | Sydney Bears | 5–0 | Perth Thunder | Perth | | |
| 29 | 23 May | 17:00 | Melbourne Ice | 5–4 | Melbourne Mustangs | Melbourne | | |
| 31 | 23 May | 17:30 | Adelaide Adrenaline | 2–8 | CBR Brave | Canberra | | |
| 32 | 24 May | 16:30 | Sydney Bears | 5 – 4 (SO) | Perth Thunder | Perth | | |
| 33 | 24 May | 17:00 | CBR Brave | 5 – 4 (SO) | Newcastle North Stars | Newcastle | | |
| 34 | 24 May | 17:00 | Adelaide Adrenaline | 6–2 | Sydney Ice Dogs | Liverpool | | |
| 35 | 30 May | 16:30 | Sydney Ice Dogs | 2–3 | Adelaide Adrenaline | Adelaide | | |
| 36 | 30 May | 17:00 | Perth Thunder | 2–6 | Melbourne Mustangs | Melbourne | | |
| 37 | 30 May | 17:00 | Newcastle North Stars | 2–6 | Sydney Bears | Penrith | | |
| 38 | 30 May | 17:30 | Melbourne Ice | 1–3 | CBR Brave | Canberra | | |
| 39 | 31 May | 15:30 | Sydney Ice Dogs | 2–4 | Adelaide Adrenaline | Adelaide | | |
| 40 | 31 May | 16:00 | Perth Thunder | 6–2 | Melbourne Mustangs | Melbourne | | |
| 41 | 31 May | 17:00 | Melbourne Ice | 4–2 | CBR Brave | Canberra | | |

=== June ===
| Game | Date | Time | Away | Score | Home | Location | Attendance | Recap |
|---|---|---|---|---|---|---|---|---|
| 42 | 6 June | 16:30 | Adelaide Adrenaline | 1–4 | Perth Thunder | Perth | | |
| 43 | 6 June | 17:00 | Melbourne Mustangs | 2–4 | Newcastle North Stars | Newcastle | | |
| 44 | 6 June | 17:30 | Sydney Ice Dogs | 1–4 | CBR Brave | Canberra | | |
| 45 | 7 June | 16:30 | Adelaide Adrenaline | 4–1 | Perth Thunder | Perth | | |
| 46 | 7 June | 17:00 | Melbourne Mustangs | 6–7 | Sydney Bears | Penrith | | |
| 47 | 13 June | 17:00 | Perth Thunder | 6 – 5 (SO) | Newcastle North Stars | Newcastle | | |
| 48 | 13 June | 17:00 | CBR Brave | 1–3 | Melbourne Ice | Melbourne | | |
| 49 | 13 June | 17:00 | Sydney Bears | 3 – 4 (SO) | Sydney Ice Dogs | Liverpool | 300 | |
| 50 | 14 June | 16:00 | CBR Brave | 2–3 | Melbourne Ice | Melbourne | | |
| 51 | 14 June | 17:00 | Perth Thunder | 4–2 | Sydney Bears | Penrith | | |
| 30 | 14 June | 17:00 | Newcastle North Stars | 9–2 | Sydney Ice Dogs | Newcastle | | |
| 52 | 20 June | 16:30 | Melbourne Mustangs | 3–4 | Perth Thunder | Perth | | |
| 53 | 20 June | 17:00 | Melbourne Ice | 4–8 | Newcastle North Stars | Newcastle | | |
| 54 | 20 June | 17:00 | CBR Brave | 3–4 | Sydney Bears | Canberra | | |
| 55 | 21 June | 15:30 | Melbourne Mustangs | 6–2 | Adelaide Adrenaline | Adelaide | | |
| 56 | 21 June | 17:00 | Melbourne Ice | 4–6 | Sydney Bears | Penrith | | |
| 57 | 21 June | 17:00 | Newcastle North Stars | 5–2 | Sydney Ice Dogs | Liverpool | | |
| 58 | 25 June | 20:00 | Melbourne Mustangs | 2–5 | Melbourne Ice | Melbourne | | |
| 59 | 27 June | 17:00 | Sydney Bears | 6–4 | Melbourne Ice | Melbourne | | |
| 60 | 27 June | 17:00 | Adelaide Adrenaline | 3–6 | Newcastle North Stars | Newcastle | | |
| 61 | 27 June | 17:30 | Sydney Ice Dogs | 4–6 | CBR Brave | Canberra | | |
| 62 | 28 June | 16:00 | Sydney Bears | 2–4 | Melbourne Mustangs | Melbourne | | |
| 63 | 28 June | 16:00 | Adelaide Adrenaline | 6–0 | Sydney Ice Dogs | Liverpool | | |
| 64 | 28 June | 17:30 | Newcastle North Stars | 5–1 | CBR Brave | Canberra | | |

=== July ===
| Game | Date | Time | Away | Score | Home | Location | Attendance | Recap |
|---|---|---|---|---|---|---|---|---|
| 65 | 4 July | 16:30 | Newcastle North Stars | 4–2 | Perth Thunder | Perth | | |
| 66 | 4 July | 16:30 | Melbourne Ice | 4–3 | Adelaide Adrenaline | Adelaide | | |
| 67 | 4 July | 17:00 | CBR Brave | 2 – 3 (SO) | Melbourne Mustangs | Melbourne | | |
| 68 | 4 July | 17:00 | Sydney Ice Dogs | 3–10 | Sydney Bears | Penrith | | |
| 69 | 5 July | 15:30 | Melbourne Ice | 3–1 | Adelaide Adrenaline | Adelaide | | |
| 70 | 5 July | 16:00 | CBR Brave | 5–4 | Melbourne Mustangs | Melbourne | | |
| 71 | 5 July | 16:30 | Newcastle North Stars | 3–4 | Perth Thunder | Perth | | |
| 72 | 11 July | 16:30 | CBR Brave | 7–11 | Adelaide Adrenaline | Adelaide | | |
| 76 | 11 July | 17:00 | Perth Thunder | 3–5 | Melbourne Ice | Melbourne | | |
| 77 | 11 July | 17:00 | Melbourne Mustangs | 3–11 | Newcastle North Stars | Newcastle | | |
| 74 | 12 July | 15:30 | CBR Brave | 6 – 5 (SO) | Adelaide Adrenaline | Adelaide | | |
| 79 | 12 July | 16:00 | Perth Thunder | 2 – 3 (SO) | Melbourne Ice | Melbourne | | |
| 80 | 12 July | 17:00 | Melbourne Mustangs | 10–1 | Sydney Ice Dogs | Liverpool | | |
| 73 | 18 July | 17:00 | Sydney Ice Dogs | 2–8 | Melbourne Mustangs | Melbourne | | |
| 78 | 18 July | 17:00 | Sydney Bears | 3–6 | CBR Brave | Canberra | | |
| 75 | 19 July | 16:00 | Sydney Ice Dogs | 0–9 | Melbourne Ice | Melbourne | | |
| 81 | 23 July | 20:00 | Melbourne Mustangs | 6 – 5 (SO) | Melbourne Ice | Melbourne | | |
| 82 | 25 July | 16:30 | Sydney Ice Dogs | 0–8 | Perth Thunder | Perth | | |
| 83 | 25 July | 17:00 | Newcastle North Stars | 1–2 | Melbourne Mustangs | Melbourne | | |
| 84 | 25 July | 17:30 | CBR Brave | 7–3 | Sydney Bears | Penrith | | |
| 85 | 26 July | 16:00 | Newcastle North Stars | 4–2 | Melbourne Ice | Melbourne | | |
| 86 | 26 July | 16:30 | Sydney Ice Dogs | 2–8 | Perth Thunder | Perth | | |

=== August ===
| Game | Date | Time | Away | Score | Home | Location | Attendance | Recap |
|---|---|---|---|---|---|---|---|---|
| 87 | 1 August | 16:30 | Melbourne Mustangs | 5–0 | Perth Thunder | Perth | | |
| 88 | 1 August | 17:00 | Newcastle North Stars | 3–2 | Sydney Bears | Penrith | | |
| 89 | 1 August | 17:00 | CBR Brave | 10–2 | Sydney Ice Dogs | Canberra | | |
| 90 | 2 August | 15:30 | Melbourne Mustangs | 7 – 8 (SO) | Adelaide Adrenaline | Adelaide | | |
| 91 | 2 August | 17:00 | Sydney Ice Dogs | 1–9 | Newcastle North Stars | Newcastle | | |
| 92 | 8 August | 16:30 | Newcastle North Stars | 5–3 | Adelaide Adrenaline | Adelaide | | |
| 93 | 8 August | 17:00 | Melbourne Ice | 11–1 | Sydney Ice Dogs | Liverpool | | |
| 94 | 8 August | 17:00 | Melbourne Mustangs | 6–8 | Sydney Bears | Penrith | | |
| 95 | 8 August | 17:30 | Perth Thunder | 4–3 | CBR Brave | Canberra | | |
| 96 | 9 August | 15:30 | Newcastle North Stars | 3 – 2 (SO) | Adelaide Adrenaline | Adelaide | | |
| 97 | 9 August | 17:00 | Melbourne Ice | 3 – 2 (SO) | Sydney Bears | Penrith | | |
| 98 | 9 August | 17:00 | Melbourne Mustangs | 9–1 | Sydney Ice Dogs | Liverpool | | |
| 99 | 9 August | 17:00 | Perth Thunder | 3–6 | CBR Brave | Canberra | | |
| 100 | 15 August | 16:30 | Melbourne Ice | 5 – 4 (SO) | Perth Thunder | Perth | | |
| 101 | 15 August | 17:00 | Adelaide Adrenaline | 5–9 | Melbourne Mustangs | Melbourne | | |
| 102 | 15 August | 17:00 | Sydney Bears | 9–1 | Sydney Ice Dogs | Liverpool | | |
| 103 | 15 August | 17:30 | Newcastle North Stars | 5 – 6 (SO) | CBR Brave | Canberra | | |
| 104 | 16 August | 16:00 | Adelaide Adrenaline | 4 – 3 (SO) | Melbourne Mustangs | Melbourne | | |
| 105 | 16 August | 16:30 | Melbourne Ice | 6–2 | Perth Thunder | Perth | | |
| 106 | 16 August | 17:00 | Sydney Bears | 2–8 | Newcastle North Stars | Newcastle | | |
| 107 | 22 August | 16:30 | Perth Thunder | 4–5 | Adelaide Adrenaline | Adelaide | | |
| 108 | 22 August | 17:00 | Sydney Bears | 1–4 | Melbourne Mustangs | Melbourne | | |
| 109 | 22 August | 17:00 | CBR Brave | 7–2 | Sydney Ice Dogs | Canberra | | |
| 110 | 23 August | 15:30 | Perth Thunder | 4 – 5 (SO) | Adelaide Adrenaline | Adelaide | | |
| 111 | 23 August | 16:00 | Sydney Bears | 3–5 | Melbourne Ice | Melbourne | | |
| 112 | 23 August | 17:00 | Sydney Ice Dogs | 0–14 | Newcastle North Stars | Newcastle | | |

=== Standings ===
| Team | GP | W | SOW | SOL | L | GF | GA | GDF | PTS |
|---|---|---|---|---|---|---|---|---|---|
| Newcastle North Stars | 28 | 19 | 1 | 4 | 4 | 152 | 83 | +69 | 63 |
| Melbourne Ice | 28 | 15 | 5 | 1 | 7 | 121 | 83 | +38 | 56 |
| Perth Thunder | 28 | 14 | 1 | 4 | 9 | 103 | 93 | +10 | 48 |
| CBR Brave | 28 | 13 | 3 | 2 | 10 | 125 | 104 | +21 | 47 |
| Adelaide Adrenaline | 28 | 11 | 3 | 3 | 11 | 109 | 111 | −2 | 42 |
| Melbourne Mustangs | 28 | 11 | 3 | 2 | 12 | 139 | 105 | +34 | 41 |
| Sydney Bears | 28 | 11 | 1 | 2 | 14 | 110 | 110 | 0 | 37 |
| Sydney Ice Dogs | 28 | 0 | 1 | 0 | 27 | 39 | 209 | −170 | 0^{1} |

| Qualified for the Goodall Cup playoffs | H Newman Reid Trophy winners |

^{1}The Ice Dogs were fined three competition points for multiple breaches by-law 4 which requires teams to travel with at least 15 players unless an exemption has been granted.

=== Statistics ===
==== Scoring leaders ====
List shows the ten top skaters sorted by points, then goals.

| Player | Team | GP | G | A | Pts | PIM | POS |
|---|---|---|---|---|---|---|---|
| Geordie Wudrick | Newcastle North Stars | 28 | 44 | 47 | 91 | 40 | F |
| Stephen Blunden | CBR Brave | 24 | 28 | 51 | 79 | 46 | F |
| Luke Moffatt | Newcastle North Stars | 21 | 33 | 32 | 65 | 32 | F |
| Kelly Geoffrey | CBR Brave | 21 | 28 | 33 | 61 | 40 | F |
| Jan Safar | Newcastle North Stars | 28 | 11 | 45 | 56 | 44 | F |
| Joseph Harcharik | Sydney Bears | 28 | 27 | 25 | 52 | 26 | F |
| Thomas Powell | Melbourne Ice | 28 | 21 | 31 | 52 | 12 | F |
| Matt Armstrong | Melbourne Ice | 26 | 19 | 32 | 51 | 28 | F |
| Patrick O'Kane | Melbourne Mustangs | 28 | 22 | 26 | 48 | 8 | F |
| Wehebe Darge | Adelaide Adrenaline | 26 | 23 | 21 | 44 | 65 | F |

==== Leading goaltenders ====
Only the top five goaltenders, based on save percentage with a minimum 40% of the team's ice time.

| Player | Team | MIP | SOG | GA | GAA | SVS% | SO |
|---|---|---|---|---|---|---|---|
| Josh Unice | CBR Brave | 679 | 533 | 42 | 3.09 | 0.921 | 0 |
| Dayne Davis | Newcastle North Stars | 1074 | 684 | 60 | 2.79 | 0.912 | 0 |
| Mark Guggenberger | Perth Thunder | 747 | 494 | 46 | 3.08 | 0.907 | 0 |
| Charlie Smart | Adelaide Adrenaline | 1031 | 687 | 73 | 3.54 | 0.894 | 2 |
| Jaden Pine-Murphy | Melbourne Ice | 857 | 534 | 57 | 3.33 | 0.893 | 1 |

=== Season awards ===
Below lists the 2015 AIHL regular season award winners.

| Award | Name | Team |
|---|---|---|
| MVP | (Canada) Geordie Wudrick | Newcastle North Stars |
| Goaltender | (Czech Republic) Kamil Jarina | Sydney Bears |
| Defenceman | (Czech Republic) Jan Safar | Newcastle North Stars |
| Rookie | (Australia) Kieran Webster | Perth Thunder |
| Local player | (Australia) Wehebe Darge | Adelaide Adrenaline |
| Coach | (Australia) Dave Kenway | Perth Thunder |

== Goodall Cup playoffs ==
The 2015 playoffs started on 29 August 2015, with the Goodall Cup final being held on 30 August. Following the end of the regular season the top four teams advanced to the playoff series. All three games were held at the Medibank Icehouse in Docklands, Victoria, the home of the Melbourne Ice and Melbourne Mustangs. The series was a single game elimination with the two winning semi-finalists advancing to the Goodall Cup final. The finals were again sponsored by Air Canada, their third year in a row. The Goodall Cup was won by the Newcastle Northstars who defeated the Melbourne Ice 3–2, from a penalty shot in first overtime. Geordie Wudrick of the Newcastle North Stars was named the finals Most Valuable Player. Following a fundraising campaign the three playoff games were streamed live for free by ATC Productions with the grand final being watched in 771 cities across 89 countries. In addition Fox Sports broadcast a 90-minute special of each game on successive days from 8 to 10 September.

Semifinals
1 | Newcastle North Stars | 4
4 | CBR Brave | 3
3 | Perth Thunder | 0
2 | Melbourne Ice | 1

Final
Newcastle North Stars | 3
Melbourne Ice | 2

=== Semi-finals ===
All times are UTC+10:00

| 29 August 2015; 15:00 | CBR Brave | 3–4 (2–0, 1–1, 0–3) | Newcastle North Stars | Medibank Icehouse; Attendance: 1200 |

Game reference

Aleksi Toivonen
Goalies
Dayne Davis
Referee:
Cory Ross
Linesmen:
Casper Russell-Huber
Fraser Ohlson

| Geoffrey (SH) (Mariani, Blunden) – 1:08 | 1 – 0 |
| Blunden (SH) (Geoffrey, Rummukainen) – 7:14 | 2 – 0 |
| Blunden (Peddle, Geoffrey) – 18:59 | 3 – 0 |
| | 3 – 1 | 22:47 – Malloy (PP) (Wudrick) |
| | 3 – 2 | 38:45 – Wudrick (Starke) |
| | 3 – 3 | 44:09 – Wudrick |
| | 3 – 4 | 48:49 – Wudrick |

47 min
Penalties
18 min
20
Shots
38

| 29 August 2015; 18:30 | Perth Thunder | 0–1 (0–0, 0–0, 0–1) | Melbourne Ice | Medibank Icehouse; Attendance: 1400 |

Game reference
| Mark Guggenberger | Goalies | Alex Leclerc | Referee: Jeff Scott; Linesmen: Joe Mayer; Tim Bell |
| 0–1 / 33:03 – Humphries (PP) (Baclig, Graham) | | | Referee: Jeff Scott; Linesmen: Joe Mayer; Tim Bell |
| 4 min | Penalties | 6 min | Referee: Jeff Scott; Linesmen: Joe Mayer; Tim Bell |
| 28 | Shots | 33 | Referee: Jeff Scott; Linesmen: Joe Mayer; Tim Bell |

=== Final ===
| 30 August 2015; 15:00 | Melbourne Ice | 2 – 3 OT (1–1, 0–0, 1–1, 0–1) | Newcastle North Stars | Medibank Icehouse; Attendance: 2000 |

Game reference

Alex Leclerc
Goalies
Dayne Davis
Referee:
Jeff Scott
Linesmen:
Tim Bell
Joe Mayer

| | 0 – 1 | 8:40 – Wudrick (Bales, Malloy) |
| Powell – 13:30 | 1 – 1 |
| | 1 – 2 | 48:17 – Safar (Swiston, Taylor) |
| Humphries (SH) (Baclig, Armstrong) – 49:29 | 2 – 2 |
| | 2 – 3 | 52:44 – Bales (PS) |

6 min
Penalties
8 min
30
Shots
31

== All-Star weekend ==
On 19 August the league announced that they will hold the inaugural All-Star Weekend at the Hunter Ice Skating Stadium in Newcastle on 12 and 13 September. The event featured a skills competition on 12 September and an All-Star game on 13 September. APA Group was announced as the sponsor of the weekend while Fox Sports broadcast a 90-minute special on 17 September. The skills competition involved all 34 players competing in at least one of the six skill-based contests. The six events to be featured included a breakaway challenge, fastest skater, elimination shootout, hardest shot, shooting accuracy and puck control. The All-Star game consisted of two teams named Team Bales and Team Schlamp, named after their respective captains Brian Bales and Michael Schlamp and features players from different teams.

The Skills competition saw players from the Melbourne Ice and Newcastle North Stars take out two of the six events each, while the Adelaide Adrenaline and Perth Thunder picked up one each. On 13 September Team Schlamp defeated Team Bales 7–3 at the Hunter Ice Skating Stadium to win the 2015 All-Star Game. Patrick O’Kane of the Melbourne Mustangs was named the most valuable player of the match.

=== Skills competition ===
- Breakaway Challenge: Brian Bales (Newcastle North Stars)
- Fastest Skater: Robert Haselhurst (Perth Thunder)
- Elimination Shootout: Matt Wetini (Newcastle North Stars)
- Hardest Shot: Matt Armstrong – 96 mph (Melbourne Ice)
- Shooting Accuracy: Josef Rezek (Adelaide Adrenaline)
- Stick Handling: Thomas Powell (Melbourne Ice)

=== All-star game ===
| 13 September 2015; 13:00 | Team Schlamp | 7–3 (4–1, 2–1, 1–1) | Team Bales | Hunter Ice Skating Stadium |

Game reference
| 0 min | Penalties | 0 min |
| 34 | Shots | 35 |
