= 2015 CBR Brave season =

2015 CBR Brave
- League: 4th AIHL
- 2015 record: 13–3–2–10
- Home record: 9–1–1–3
- Road record: 4–2–1–7
- Goals for: 125
- Goals against: 104

Team information
- Coach: (Australia) Brad Hunt (United States) Josh Unice (Interim head coach)
- Assistant coach: (United States) David Rogina (Australia) Aaron Clayworth
- Captain: (Australia) Mark Rummukainen
- Alternate captains: (Australia) Peter Taylor (Australia) Aaron Clayworth (Australia) Jimmy Byers
- Arena: Phillip Ice Skating Centre

Team leaders
- Goals: (Canada) Stephen Blunden (28) (Canada) Kelly Geoffrey
- Assists: (Canada) Stephen Blunden (51)
- Points: (Canada) Stephen Blunden (79)
- Penalty minutes: (Australia) David Dunwoodie (120)
- Goals against average: (United States) Josh Unice (3.71)

The 2015 CBR Brave season was the Brave's 2nd season in the Australian Ice Hockey League since being founded and entering the league in 2014. The season ran from 25 April 2015 to 29 August 2015 for the Brave. CBR finished fourth in the regular season behind the Newcastle North Stars, Melbourne Ice and Perth Thunder. The Brave qualified for the AIHL Finals in Melbourne and played in semi-final one. Canberra were defeated by league premiers, the Newcastle North Stars, 3–4 in their semi-final match and were knocked out of the finals weekend, ending their season.

== News ==
In January 2015, the Brave announced the appointment of Brad Hunt as the new head coach of the team for the 2015 AIHL season. Brad was originally going to take on the assistant coach role for 2015 after hanging up the skates at the end of the 2014 season but with former head coach Matti Louma leaving the club to take on a development coaching position in Perth, Hunt was promoted to head coach instead.

In February 2015, the league commission announced scheduling changes for the 2015 season that saw the Sydney Ice Dogs and Sydney Bears move three home matches from Sydney to Canberra.

In March 2015, the CBR Brave in conjunction with Ice Hockey ACT announced the formation of the Junior Brave team to compete in the 2015 NSW Midget League. The junior program was coached by former AIHL player and Australian representative Andrew Brunt and finished their first season by finishing second in the league and losing the grand final to defending champions, the Liverpool Saints, 3–1. Three of the Junior Brave players made their debut with the senior CBR Brave team in the AIHL during 2015, including: goalie Alexandre Tetrault and forwards Jayden Lewis and Jordan Brunt. Alexandre Tetrault was also selected to represent Australia in the Under 20 World Championships in Serbia in 2016.

In July 2015, the CBR Brave and head coach Brad Hunt parted ways by mutual consent. On ice performances during the first half of the regular season and future planning were cited as the main reasons for the decision. Import goaltender, Josh Unice, was appointed interim head coach for the remainder of the season. Alternative captain, Aaron Clayworth, retired from playing and stepped in to take over as assistant coach for the remainder of the season.

== Roster ==
Team roster for the 2015 AIHL season

2015 AIHL CBR Brave Roster
#	Nat	Name	Pos	S/G	Age	Acquired	Birthplace
73	(Canada)	Stephen Blunden	W	L	26	2014	Gloucester, Ontario, Canada
92	(Australia)	Jordan Brunt	F	L	15	2015	Canberra, Australian Capital Territory, Australia
22	(Australia)	Harrison Byers	C	R	22	2014	Regina, Saskatchewan, Canada
17	(Australia)	James Byers	D	R	21	2014	Canberra, Australian Capital Territory, Australia
6	(Australia)	Aaron Clayworth	D	R	30	2014	Perth, Western Australia, Australia
14	(Australia)	David Dunwoodie	D	R	29	2015	Hamilton, New Zealand
38	(Australia)	Nickolas Eckhardt	G	L	25	2014	Canberra, Australian Capital Territory, Australia
19	(Australia)	Jordan Gavin	F	R	32–33	2014	Canberra, Australian Capital Territory, Australia
39	(Canada)	Kelly Geoffrey	W	L	25	2015	Newmarket, Ontario, Canada
27	(Canada)	Mike Giorgi	D	L	27	2014	Toronto, Ontario, Canada
65	(New Zealand)	Matthew Harvey	D	R	29	2014	Calgary, Alberta, Canada
3	(United States)	Ryan Johnson	F	R	40–41	2014	Amesbury, Massachusetts, United States
16	(Australia)	Tyler Kubara	F	R	20	2015	Wombarra, New South Wales, Australia
77	(Australia)	Tom Letki	F	R	26	2014	Canberra, Australian Capital Territory, Australia
11	(Australia)	David Lewis	F	L	37	2014	Canberra, Australian Capital Territory, Australia
93	(Australia)	Jayden Lewis	F	L	16–17	2015	Canberra, Australian Capital Territory, Australia
8	(Australia)	Tomas Manco	D	L	27	2015	Brezno, Slovakia
4	(Canada)	Kyle Mariani	D	R	26	2015	Toronto, Ontario, Canada
64	(Australia)	Kai Miettinen	F	L	19	2014	Canberra, Australian Capital Territory, Australia
24	(Australia)	Ben Pagett	D	0	30	2015	Brisbane, Queensland, Australia
77	(Canada)	Jordan Peddle	C	L	24	2015	Elbow, Saskatchewan, Canada
61	(Canada)	Scott Pitt	C	L	27	2015	Ottawa, Ontario, Canada
32	(Australia)	Alain Riesen	F	L	24–25	2014	Canberra, Australian Capital Territory, Australia
12	(Australia)	Mark Rummukainen	D	R	33	2014	Canberra, Australian Capital Territory, Australia
91	(Australia)	Peter Taylor	F	R	27	2014	Canberra, Australian Capital Territory, Australia
92	(Australia)	Alex Tetreault	G	L	17	2015	Montreal, Quebec, Canada
69	(Australia)	Aleksi Toivonen	G	L	19	2015	Canberra, Australian Capital Territory, Australia
30	(United States)	Josh Unice	G	L	26	2015	Holland, Ohio, United States
29	(Australia)	Stuart Woodall	G	L	32	2014	Canberra, Australian Capital Territory, Australia

== Transfers ==
All the player transfers in and out by the CBR Brave for the 2015 AIHL season.

=== In ===
Pos	Player	Transferred From	Local / Import
F	(Australia) Jordan Brunt	No Team	Local
D	(Australia) David Dunwoodie	(Australia) Sydney Ice Dogs	Local
W	(Canada) Kelly Geoffrey	No Team	Import
F	(Australia) Tyler Kubara	(Australia) Sydney Ice Dogs	Local
F	(Australia) Jayden Lewis	(Australia) Meaford Knights	Local
D	(Australia) Tomas Manco	No Team	Local
D	(Canada) Kyle Mariani	(Canada) Laval Prédateurs	Import
D	(Australia) Ben Pagett	No Team	Local
C	(Canada) Jordan Peddle	(United States) Mississippi Surge	Import
C	(Canada) Scott Pitt	Braehead Clan	Import
G	(Australia) Alexandre Tetreault	No Team	Local
G	(Australia) Aleksi Toivonen	(Finland) HCIK	Local
G	(United States) Josh Unice	Sheffield Steelers	Import

=== Out ===
Pos	Player	Transferred To	Local / Import
D	(Australia) David Bell	No Team	Local
F	(Australia) Darren Cope	No Team	Local
F	(Canada) Jeff Harvey	No Team	Import
G	(Australia) Brad Hunt	(Australia) CBR Brave head coach	Local
C	(Finland) Anton Kokkonen	(Finland) TuTo	Import
F	(Australia) Matthew Lehoczky	No Team	Local
F	(Australia) Christopher McPhail	No Team	Local
W	(Canada) Mathieu Ouellette	No Team	Import
G	(Finland) Petri Pitkänen	(Finland) KeuPa HT	Import
F	(Australia) Shai Rabinowitz	No Team	Local
D	(Australia) Darren Taylor	No Team	Local
F	(Canada) Derek Walker	No Team	Import
F	(Canada) Corey Wilkie	(Canada) Ste. Anne Aces	Import

== Staff ==
Staff Roster for 2015 AIHL season

2015 AIHL CBR Brave Staff
Role	Staff
Head coach	(United States) Josh Unice (Australia) Brad Hunt
Assistant coach	(United States) David Rogina
Assistant coach	(Australia) Aaron Clayworth
Physiotherapist	(Australia) Carolyn Smith
Equipment manager	(Australia) Adrian Miller
Bench official	(Australia) Darren Sault
Bench official	(Australia) Kelly Sault

== Standings ==
=== Regular season ===
Summary

Season	Overall										Home								Away							
Season	P	W	L	OW	OL	GF	GA	GD	Pts	Finish	P	W	L	OW	OL	GF	GA	GD	P	W	L	OW	OL	GF	GA	GD
2015	28	13	10	3	2	125	104	+21	47	4th	14	9	3	1	1	62	45	+17	14	4	7	2	1	63	59	+4

Position by round

Round	1	2	3	4	5	6	7	8	9	10	11	12	13	14	15	16	17	18
Position	5	4	5	5	5	4	3	5	6	6	6	6	4	4	4	4	4	4

Updated to match(es) played on Completed. Source: www.icehockeynewsaustralia.com

League table

Team	GP	W	SOW	SOL	L	GF	GA	GDF	PTS
Newcastle North Stars	28	19	1	4	4	152	83	+69	63
Melbourne Ice	28	15	5	1	7	121	83	+38	56
Perth Thunder	28	14	1	4	9	103	93	+10	48
CBR Brave	28	13	3	2	10	125	104	+21	47
Adelaide Adrenaline	28	11	3	3	11	109	111	−2	42
Melbourne Mustangs	28	11	3	2	12	139	105	+34	41
Sydney Bears	28	11	1	2	14	110	110	0	37
Sydney Ice Dogs	28	0	1	0	27	39	209	−170	0^{1}

Qualified for the Goodall Cup playoffs	H Newman Reid Trophy winners

^{1}The Ice Dogs were fined three competition points for multiple breaches by-law 4 which requires teams to travel with at least 15 players unless an exemption has been granted.

=== Finals ===
Summary

Season	Finals weekend							
Season	P	W	L	GF	GA	Result	Semi-final	Goodall Cup final
2015	1	0	1	3	4	Semi-finalists	Lost 3-4 (North Stars)	

Bracket

Semifinals
1	Newcastle North Stars	4
4	CBR Brave	3
3	Perth Thunder	0
2	Melbourne Ice	1

Final
Newcastle North Stars	3
Melbourne Ice	2

== Schedule & results ==
=== Regular season ===
Matchday	1	2	3	4	5	6	7	8	9	10	11	12	13	14	15	16	17	18	19	20	21	22	23	24	25	26	27	28
Arena	H	A	H	A	A	H	H	H	A	H	H	H	A	A	A	H	H	A	A	A	A	H	A	A	H	H	H	A
Result	W	L	W	L	L	W	L	W	W	W	L	W	L	L	L	W	L	L	W	L	W	W	W	W	L	W	W	W

Updated to match(es) played on Completed. Source: AIHL
A = Away; H = Home; W = Win; L = Loss

2015 fixtures and results
Date	Time	Away	Score	Home	Location	Recap
25 April	17:30	Sydney Bears	2–4	CBR Brave	Canberra	
26 April	17:00	CBR Brave	4–7	Newcastle North Stars	Newcastle	
2 May	17:30	Adelaide Adrenaline	3–5	CBR Brave	Canberra	
9 May	16:30	CBR Brave	3–4	Perth Thunder	Perth	
10 May	16:30	CBR Brave	1–4	Perth Thunder	Perth	
16 May	17:30	Melbourne Mustangs	4–5	CBR Brave	Canberra	
17 May	17:00	Melbourne Mustangs	4 – 3 (SO)	CBR Brave	Canberra	
23 May	17:30	Adelaide Adrenaline	2–8	CBR Brave	Canberra	
24 May	17:00	CBR Brave	5 – 4 (SO)	Newcastle North Stars	Newcastle	
30 May	17:30	Melbourne Ice	1–3	CBR Brave	Canberra	
31 May	17:00	Melbourne Ice	4–2	CBR Brave	Canberra	
6 June	17:30	Sydney Ice Dogs	1–4	CBR Brave	Canberra	
13 June	17:00	CBR Brave	1–3	Melbourne Ice	Melbourne	
14 June	16:00	CBR Brave	2–3	Melbourne Ice	Melbourne	
20 June	17:00	CBR Brave	3–4	Sydney Bears	Canberra	
27 June	17:30	Sydney Ice Dogs	4–6	CBR Brave	Canberra	
28 June	17:30	Newcastle North Stars	5–1	CBR Brave	Canberra	
4 July	17:00	CBR Brave	2 – 3 (SO)	Melbourne Mustangs	Melbourne	
5 July	16:00	CBR Brave	5–4	Melbourne Mustangs	Melbourne	
11 July	16:30	CBR Brave	7–11	Adelaide Adrenaline	Adelaide	
12 July	15:30	CBR Brave	6 – 5 (SO)	Adelaide Adrenaline	Adelaide	
18 July	17:00	Sydney Bears	3–6	CBR Brave	Canberra	
25 July	17:30	CBR Brave	7–3	Sydney Bears	Penrith	
1 August	17:00	CBR Brave	10–2	Sydney Ice Dogs	Canberra	
8 August	17:30	Perth Thunder	4–3	CBR Brave	Canberra	
9 August	17:00	Perth Thunder	3–6	CBR Brave	Canberra	
15 August	17:30	Newcastle North Stars	5 – 6 (SO)	CBR Brave	Canberra	
22 August	17:00	CBR Brave	7–2	Sydney Ice Dogs	Canberra	

=== Finals ===
Goodall Cup semi-final All times are UTC+10:00

29 August 2015; 15:00	CBR Brave	3–4 (2–0, 1–1, 0–3)	Newcastle North Stars	Melbourne Icehouse; Attendance: 1200

Game reference

Aleksi Toivonen
Goalies
Dayne Davis
Referee:
Cory Ross
Linesmen:
Casper Russell-Huber
Fraser Ohlson

Geoffrey (SH) (Mariani, Blunden) – 1:08	1 – 0
Blunden (SH) (Geoffrey, Rummukainen) – 7:14	2 – 0
Blunden (Peddle, Geoffrey) – 18:59	3 – 0
	3 – 1	22:47 – Malloy (PP) (Wudrick)
	3 – 2	38:45 – Wudrick (Starke)
	3 – 3	44:09 – Wudrick
	3 – 4	48:49 – Wudrick

47 min
Penalties
18 min
20
Shots
38

== Player statistics ==
=== Skaters ===
Regular season
Nat	Player	Pos	M	G	A	P	PIM
(Canada)	Stephen Blunden	D	24	28	51	79	46
(Australia)	Jordan Brunt	F	1	0	0	0	0
(Australia)	Harrison Byers	D	25	4	2	6	102
(Australia)	James Byers	F	26	1	9	10	10
(Australia)	Aaron Clayworth	F	17	0	1	1	10
(Australia)	David Dunwoodie	F	20	4	18	22	120
(Australia)	Jordan Gavin	D	21	5	2	7	18
(Canada)	Kelly Geoffrey	D	21	28	33	61	40
(Canada)	Mike Giorgi	F	2	0	1	1	2
(New Zealand)	Matthew Harvey	F	11	7	5	12	2
(United States)	Ryan Johnson	F	24	3	4	7	55
(Australia)	Tyler Kubara	D	27	5	10	15	4
(Australia)	Tom Letki	F	2	0	0	0	0
(Australia)	David Lewis	F	23	1	1	2	2
(Australia)	Jayden Lewis	F	1	0	1	1	0
(Australia)	Tomas Manco	F	23	0	6	6	20
(Canada)	Kyle Mariani	F	24	10	18	28	46
(Australia)	Kai Miettinen	F	28	2	4	6	38
(Australia)	Ben Pagett	F	5	0	0	0	2
(Canada)	Jordan Peddle	D	7	2	8	10	24
(Canada)	Scott Pitt	F	19	18	24	42	18
(Australia)	Alain Riesen	F	17	0	2	2	8
(Australia)	Mark Rummukainen	D	26	3	10	13	49
(Australia)	Peter Taylor	D	24	1	2	3	18

Finals
Nat	Player	Pos	M	G	A	P	PIM
(Canada)	Stephen Blunden	D	1	2	1	3	25
(Australia)	Jordan Brunt	F	0	0	0	0	0
(Australia)	Harrison Byers	D	0	0	0	0	0
(Australia)	James Byers	F	1	0	0	0	0
(Australia)	Aaron Clayworth	F	0	0	0	0	0
(Australia)	David Dunwoodie	F	1	0	0	0	4
(Australia)	Jordan Gavin	D	1	0	0	0	0
(Canada)	Kelly Geoffrey	D	1	1	2	3	0
(Canada)	Mike Giorgi	F	0	0	0	0	0
(New Zealand)	Matthew Harvey	F	1	0	0	0	0
(United States)	Ryan Johnson	F	0	0	0	0	0
(Australia)	Tyler Kubara	D	0	0	0	0	0
(Australia)	Tom Letki	F	0	0	0	0	0
(Australia)	David Lewis	F	1	0	0	0	0
(Australia)	Jayden Lewis	F	0	0	0	0	0
(Australia)	Tomas Manco	F	1	0	0	0	0
(Canada)	Kyle Mariani	F	1	0	1	1	16
(Australia)	Kai Miettinen	F	1	0	0	0	0
(Australia)	Ben Pagett	F	0	0	0	0	0
(Canada)	Jordan Peddle	D	1	0	1	1	2
(Canada)	Scott Pitt	F	0	0	0	0	0
(Australia)	Alain Riesen	F	1	0	0	0	0
(Australia)	Mark Rummukainen	D	1	0	1	1	0
(Australia)	Peter Taylor	D	0	0	0	0	0

=== Goaltenders ===
Regular season
Nat	Player	Pos	M	SO	MP	GA	GAA	SA	SV	SV%	G	A	PIM
(Australia)	Nickolas Eckhardt	G	0	-	-	-	-	-	-	-	-	-	-
(Australia)	Alex Tetreault	G	1	0	50	2	2.40	20	18	0.900	0	0	0
(Australia)	Aleksi Toivonen	G	10	0	463	36	4.66	311	275	0.884	0	1	0
(United States)	Josh Unice	G	14	0	679	42	3.71	533	491	0.921	0	1	2
(Australia)	Stuart Woodall	G	6	0	198	19	5.76	120	101	0.842	0	0	0

Finals
Nat	Player	Pos	M	SO	MP	GA	GAA	SA	SV	SV%	G	A	PIM
(Australia)	Nickolas Eckhardt	G	-	-	-	-	-	-	-	-	-	-	-
(Australia)	Alex Tetreault	G	-	-	-	-	-	-	-	-	-	-	-
(Australia)	Aleksi Toivonen	G	1	0	49	4	4.88	38	34	0.895	0	0	0
(United States)	Josh Unice	G	-	-	-	-	-	-	-	-	-	-	-
(Australia)	Stuart Woodall	G	-	-	-	-	-	-	-	-	-	-	-

== Awards ==
Team awards for 2015 season

2015 Brave awards
Award	Recipient
Bravest of the Brave	(Canada) Stephen Blunden
Best Forward	(Canada) Stephen Blunden
Best Defenceman	(Canada) Kyle Mariani
Fans Choice	(Australia) Jimmy Byers
Player's Choice	(Australia) Mark Rummukainen
Coach's Award	(Australia) Kai Miettinen (Australia) Peter Taylor
Emerging Brave	(Australia) Jimmy Byers
John Lewis Memorial Award	(United States) Ryan Johnson

AIHL awards for 2015 season

2015 AIHL awards
Award	Recipient
* No Brave players won any AIHL Awards in 2015
