= List of ECSL seasons =

The East Coast Super League is a senior ice hockey league in New South Wales, Australia. The league played its first season in 2002 with four teams and has recently finished its fifteenth season with five teams. The most recent champion is the Reach Rebels who won the 2016 regular season and playoffs.

== Seasons ==
Season	Number of teams	Notes
2002	4	Raptors win the 2002 playoffs
2003	4	Sydney Heat win the 2003 playoffs
2004	4	Raptors win the 2004 playoffs, claiming their second title
2005	6	Newcastle North Stars enters a farm team and another team joins as the league expands to six Newcastle North Stars win the 2005 playoffs
2006	6	Ice Breakers win the 2006 playoffs
2007	4	Raptors and the 2005 expansion team cease operations Newcastle North Stars win the 2007 playoffs, claiming their second title The Sting's Scott Townsend is the league's top scorer with 39 points, which includes 23 goals
2008	4	Ice Breakers win the 2008 playoffs, claiming their second title The North Stars Nicholas Quirk-Orford is the league's top scorer with 48 points, which includes 24 goals
2009	5	The Penrith Raptors join as an expansion team The Sting win the 2009 playoffs The Sting's Scott Townsend is the league's top scorer for the second time in three years with 41 points, which includes 24 goals
2010	6	The Central Coast Rhinos join as an expansion team Penrith Raptors win the 2010 playoffs The Rhinos' Shane Southwood is the league's top scorer with 40 points, which includes 20 goals
2011	6	The Central Coast Rhinos leave the league and are replaced by the Vipers; The Ice Breakers cease operations The Reach Rebels join the league as an expansion team and win the 2011 playoffs in their debut season The Raptors' Jason Gibson is the league's top scorer with 40 points, which includes 21 goals
2012	6	The Reach Rebels win the regular season and the Newcastle North Stars win the 2012 playoffs, claiming their third title The Vipers Jayson Chalker is the league's top scorer with 32 points and Tim Kane of the Sting is the leading goaltender with a save percentage of 0.926
2013	6	The Sting win the regular season and the 2013 playoffs, claiming their second title The Sting's Martin Snajdr is the league's top scorer with 58 points and Francisco Sevilla is the leading goaltender with a save percentage of 0.874
2014	6	The Vipers cease operations The Blueline Bombers join as an expansion team The Reach Rebels win the regular season and the 2014 playoffs, claiming their second title The Sting's Jaroslav Murgaš is the league's top scorer with 46 points Francisco Sevilla of the Sting and the Sydney Heats Alan Becken are the leading goaltenders with a save percentage of 0.872
2015	6	The Reach Rebels win the regular season, their second in a row The Sting defeat the Rebels in the grand final series, claiming their third title Lukas Vaic of the Sting and the Rebels Alex Witts finish the regular season as the league's top scorers with 43 points each Tyrone Mendoza-Kehlet of the Rebels is the leading goaltender of the regular season with a save percentage of 0.913
2016	5	The Sydney Heat cease operations after Ice Hockey NSW instructs the league to drop one team from the competition The Reach Rebels win the regular season and the 2016 playoffs, claiming their third playoff title Hayden Sheard of the Newcastle North Stars finishes the regular season as the leading scorer with 37 points Rhett Kelly of the Rebels is the leading goaltender of the regular season with a save percentage of 0.903

== See also ==
- Australian Ice Hockey League
