= Sydney Heat =

- City: Sydney, Australia
- League: East Coast Super League
- Founded: 2002
- Operated: 2002–present
- Home arena: Penrith Ice Palace
- Owner(s): New South Wales Ice Hockey Association
- General manager: (Australia) Paul Kelly (Australia) John Lavery
- Head coach: Steven Adams (Australia) Scott Stephenson

Championships
- Regular season titles: 0
- ECSL Championships: 1 (2012–13)

The Sydney Heat are in the East Coast Super League. The team is based in Sydney, Australia.

== History ==
The Sydney Heat were founded in September 2002 following the announcement by Ice Hockey Australia of the formation of the Australian Junior Ice Hockey League. The team is controlled by the New South Wales Ice Hockey Association. On 14 October 2012 it was announced that Sydney Bears player Steven Adams and Paul Kelly had signed on as coaches for the 2012–13 AJIHL season.

== Season-by-season results ==
Season	GP	W	OTW	OTL	L	GF	GA	PTS	Finish	Playoff
2012–13	14	4	0	2	8	34	52	−18	4th	Won semi-final vs. Sydney Lightning, 7–2; Won finals series vs. Melbourne Red Wings, 2–1

== Roster ==
For the 2012–13 AJIHL season

#	Nat	Name	Pos	Date of birth	Acquired	Birthplace
19	(Australia)	Saxon Air	F	25 March 1995	2012	Central Coast, New South Wales, Australia
17	(Australia)	Spencer Austin	D	5 March 1992	2012	Hamilton, Ontario, Canada
18	(Australia)	Nolan Barlow	F	16 September 1994	2012	
6	(Australia)	Adrian Braun	F	3 June 1994	2012	
20	(Australia)	Dylan Burgess	G	8 March 1994	2012	
1	(Australia)	Jake Burgess	G	26 June 1994	2012	
13	(Australia)	Scott Clemie	F	16 December 1994	2012	Scunthorpe, England, United Kingdom
9	(Australia)	Sam Cook	D	26 July 1993	2012	Sydney, Australia
12	(Australia)	Dexter Crowe	F	3 June 1996	2012	Sydney, Australia
25	(Australia)	Jonathan Hughes	G	7 June 1995	2012	
5	(Australia)	Chris Johnson	F		2012	
11	(Australia)	James Keating	F	2 March 1992	2012	
16	(Australia)	Tyler Kubara	F	28 November 1994	2012	Wombarra, New South Wales, Australia
15	(Australia)	Samuel Lammert	F	26 July 1994	2012	Gosford, New South Wales, Australia
3	(Australia)	Ilman Lee	D	3 March 1994	2012	
7	(Australia)	Riley Major	D	9 January 1996	2012	
2	(Australia)	Kieran Poole	F	20 February 1996	2012	
8	(Australia)	Cameron Rose	D	28 January 1994	2012	
10	(Australia)	Jayden Ryan	F	21 October 1992	2012	
