= Adrian Foster (ice hockey) =

Canadian ice hockey player (born 1982)

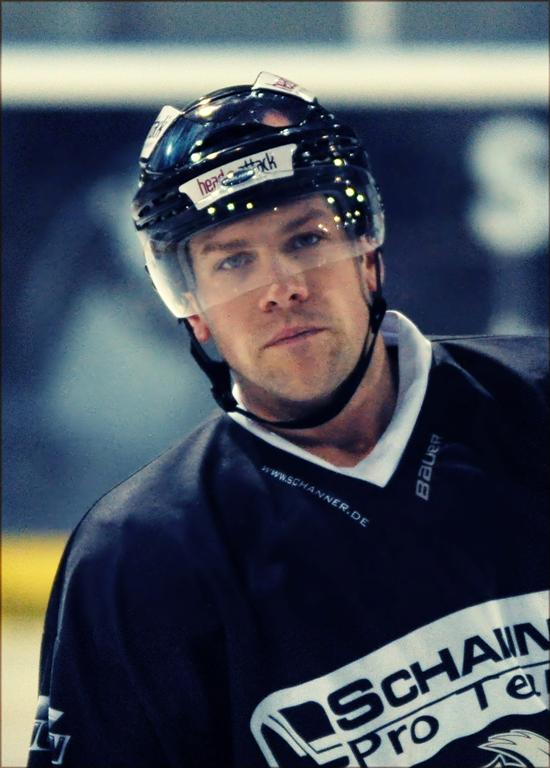
- Born: January 15, 1982 (age 44) Lethbridge, Alberta, Canada
- Height: 6 ft 0 in (183 cm)
- Weight: 205 lb (93 kg; 14 st 9 lb)
- Position: Centre
- Shot: Left
- Played for: EC Red Bull Salzburg; Dinamo Riga; Frankfurt Lions; Straubing Tigers; Grizzly Adams Wolfsburg
- NHL draft: 28th overall, 2001; New Jersey Devils
- Playing career: 2002–2016

Adrian Foster (born January 15, 1982) is a Canadian former professional ice hockey centre. He was drafted in the first round, 28th overall, in the 2001 NHL entry draft by the New Jersey Devils.

== Playing career ==
Foster was drafted in the first round, 28th overall, by the New Jersey Devils in the 2001 NHL entry draft.

Even though Foster was drafted, he never played in the National Hockey League. He spent his professional career with the Albany River Rats, Lowell Devils, and Houston Aeros of the American Hockey League, EC Red Bull Salzburg of the Austrian Hockey League, Dinamo Riga of the Kontinental Hockey League, and the Frankfurt Lions, Straubing Tigers of the DEL.

During the beginning of the 2011–12 season, Foster returned to North America, signing a contract with the Lake Erie Monsters of the AHL on October 18, 2011. Due to injury, Foster was limited to only 8 games with the Monsters, before returning to Germany at the deadline to play a stint with the Grizzly Adams Wolfsburg for the remainder of the season on February 1, 2012.

Foster remained un-signed into the 2012–13 season, before agreeing to a one-year contract with the Idaho Steelheads on October 17, 2012. He immediately marked his debut in the ECHL, producing 4 assists in a 7-6 shoot-out victory over the Colorado Eagles on the same night.

== Career statistics ==
| | | | Regular season | | | | | Playoffs |
| Season | Team | League | GP | G | A | Pts | PIM | GP | G | A | Pts | PIM |
|---|---|---|---|---|---|---|---|---|---|---|---|---|
| 1997–98 | Calgary Buffaloes AAA | AMHL | 36 | 26 | 54 | 80 | 50 | 9 | 3 | 14 | 17 | 8 |
| 1998–99 | Calgary Canucks | AJHL | 18 | 15 | 17 | 32 | 18 | — | — | — | — | — |
| 1999–2000 | Saskatoon Blades | WHL | 7 | 1 | 2 | 3 | 6 | — | — | — | — | — |
| 2000–01 | Saskatoon Blades | WHL | 5 | 0 | 5 | 5 | 4 | — | — | — | — | — |
| 2001–02 | Saskatoon Blades | WHL | 13 | 9 | 3 | 12 | 18 | — | — | — | — | — |
| 2001–02 | Brandon Wheat Kings | WHL | 15 | 4 | 11 | 15 | 14 | — | — | — | — | — |
| 2002–03 | Albany River Rats | AHL | 9 | 3 | 0 | 3 | 4 | — | — | — | — | — |
| 2003–04 | Albany River Rats | AHL | 44 | 8 | 13 | 21 | 25 | — | — | — | — | — |
| 2004–05 | Albany River Rats | AHL | 51 | 6 | 11 | 17 | 27 | — | — | — | — | — |
| 2005–06 | Albany River Rats | AHL | 8 | 2 | 1 | 3 | 18 | — | — | — | — | — |
| 2006–07 | Lowell Devils | AHL | 10 | 1 | 1 | 2 | 12 | — | — | — | — | — |
| 2007–08 | Houston Aeros | AHL | 70 | 15 | 23 | 38 | 50 | 4 | 0 | 2 | 2 | 2 |
| 2008–09 | EC Red Bull Salzburg | EBEL | 52 | 19 | 24 | 43 | 107 | 17 | 5 | 7 | 12 | 34 |
| 2009–10 | Dinamo Riga | KHL | 10 | 2 | 2 | 4 | 8 | — | — | — | — | — |
| 2009–10 | Frankfurt Lions | DEL | 9 | 0 | 1 | 1 | 6 | — | — | — | — | — |
| 2010–11 | Örebro HK | SWE.2 | 7 | 0 | 0 | 0 | 10 | — | — | — | — | — |
| 2010–11 | Straubing Tigers | DEL | 10 | 2 | 6 | 8 | 20 | — | — | — | — | — |
| 2011–12 | Lake Erie Monsters | AHL | 8 | 3 | 1 | 4 | 8 | — | — | — | — | — |
| 2011–12 | Grizzly Adams Wolfsburg | DEL | 10 | 1 | 4 | 5 | 10 | 4 | 0 | 1 | 1 | 6 |
| 2012–13 | Idaho Steelheads | ECHL | 26 | 11 | 16 | 27 | 26 | 16 | 5 | 9 | 14 | 10 |
| 2013–14 | San Francisco Bulls | ECHL | 15 | 5 | 12 | 17 | 36 | — | — | — | — | — |
| 2013–14 | Abbotsford Heat | AHL | 5 | 0 | 1 | 1 | 2 | — | — | — | — | — |
| 2014–15 | Okotoks Drillers | ChHL | 22 | 10 | 29 | 39 | 8 | 3 | 3 | 1 | 4 | 6 |
| 2015–16 | Stony Plain Eagles | ChHL | 2 | 0 | 0 | 0 | 0 | 8 | 1 | 1 | 2 | 8 |
| AHL totals | | | 205 | 38 | 51 | 89 | 146 | 4 | 0 | 2 | 2 | 2 |

Awards and achievements
| Preceded by David Hale | New Jersey Devils first-round draft pick 2001 | Succeeded by Zach Parise |
