= Luke Moffatt =

American ice hockey player (born 1992)

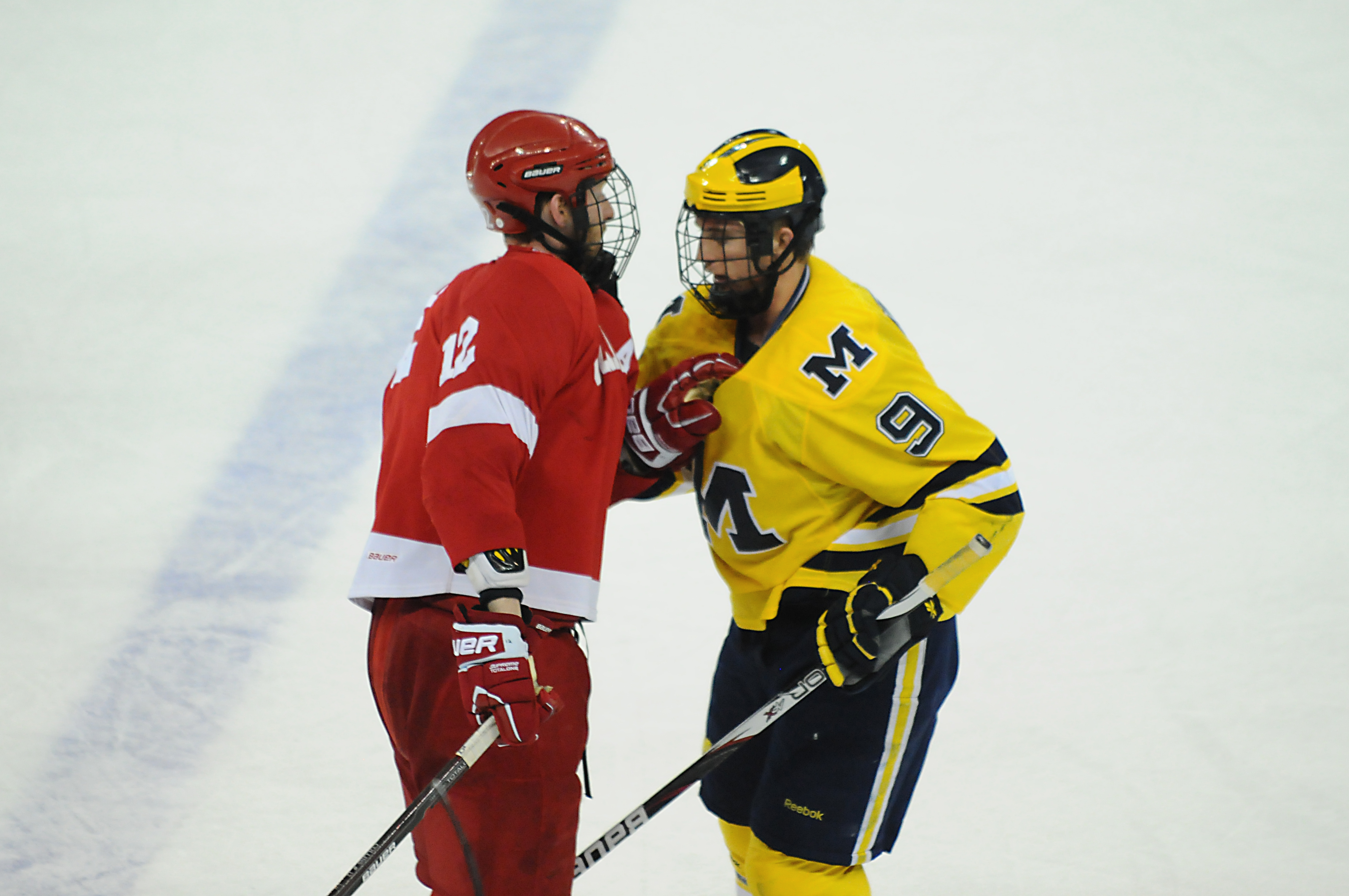
- Mofatt playing with the Michigan Wolverines in the Midwest Regional Semifinals of the 2012 NCAA Division I men's ice hockey tournament
- Born: June 11, 1992 (age 34) Paradise Valley, Arizona
- Height: 6 ft 0 in (183 cm)
- Weight: 198 lb (90 kg; 14 st 2 lb)
- Position: Right winger
- Shot: Right
- Played for: Frölunda HC; Storhamar Dragons; Newcastle North Stars; HC Gherdëina; Chamonix-Morzine; Manchester Storm
- NHL draft: 197th overall, 2010; Colorado Avalanche
- Playing career: 2014–2019

Luke Moffatt (born June 11, 1992) is an American former professional ice hockey forward who last played for the Manchester Storm in the EIHL. Moffatt was drafted 197th overall by the Colorado Avalanche in the 2010 NHL entry draft.

== Playing career ==
Moffatt was born in Paradise Valley, Arizona. He completed School at Pioneer High while remaining in Ann Arbor, Michigan to play junior hockey in the U.S. National Development Team Program. In his two years within the USA Hockey program, Moffatt competed in several tournaments and scored 15 points in 28 games during the 2009–10 season while in the United States Hockey League. After committing to play collegiate hockey with the University of Michigan, Moffatt was the Colorado Avalanche's last pick selected in the 2010 NHL entry draft, 197th overall.

In his sophomore season with the Michigan Wolverines in 2011–12, Moffatt was named to the CCHA All-Tournament Team in compiling 16 points in 40 contests. While on scholarship throughout his collegiate career he improved upon his goal scoring totals each year and in his senior season was honored by the Wolverines with the Carl Isaacson Award as the team's best student-athlete. After completing his tenure with the University of Michigan in the 2013–14 season, Moffatt was not offered a contract by the Colorado Avalanche.

As a free agent, Moffatt opted to pursue his professional abroad, signing an initial try-out contract with top-level club, Frölunda HC of the Swedish Hockey League on September 3, 2015. He made the Indians opening night roster realising his professional debut to begin the 2014–15 season. After 10 games with Frölunda, registering 2 assists, his trial period ended and he was not offered an extension. On October 17, 2014, Moffatt moved to Norway, agreeing to terms for the remainder of the year with the Storhamar Dragons of the GET-ligaen. In 33 games, Moffatt established himself on the top scoring line with the Dragons and scored at better than a point-per-game with 44. Moffatt scored 14 points in 16 post-season games as the Dragons lost a Championship game 7 final to the Stavanger Oilers. Moffatt opted to continue playing in the off-season, enjoying an extended playing-holiday in Australia after agreeing to terms with the Newcastle North Stars of the Australian Ice Hockey League. He dominated in scoring with the North Stars, compiling 65 points in just 21 games.

On July 14, 2015, Moffatt continued his European venture by agreeing to terms on a one-year deal with HC Gherdëina of the Italian Serie A. Alongside fellow former Avalanche draft pick, Justin Mercier, Moffatt played on the top-line with Gherdëina, leading the Italian club with 53 points in 42 games in the 2015–16 season.

Upon leaving Italy, Moffatt continued his European career, signing as a free agent with the newly formed Chamonix-Morzine Pioneers of the Ligue Magnus on August 4, 2016.

On June 2, 2017, Moffatt's signing for Manchester Storm on a one-year basis was announced by the club. Moffatt enjoyed two seasons with the Storm, leading the club with 128 points through 113 games before opting to conclude his professional career by announcing his retirement following the 2018–19 season.

== Career statistics ==
=== Regular season and playoffs ===
			Regular season					Playoffs
Season	Team	League	GP	G	A	Pts	PIM	GP	G	A	Pts	PIM
2008–09	U.S. National Development Team	NAHL	42	17	10	27	30	9	0	3	3	4
2009–10	U.S. National Development Team	USHL	28	5	10	15	22	—	—	—	—	—
2010–11	Univ. of Michigan	CCHA	36	5	8	13	12	—	—	—	—	—
2011–12	Univ. of Michigan	CCHA	40	6	10	16	29	—	—	—	—	—
2012–13	Univ. of Michigan	CCHA	38	8	13	21	14	—	—	—	—	—
2013–14	Univ. of Michigan	B1G	34	13	12	25	8	—	—	—	—	—
2014–15	Frölunda HC	SHL	10	0	2	2	0	—	—	—	—	—
2014–15	Storhamar Dragons	GET	33	20	24	44	26	16	6	8	14	4
2015	Newcastle North Stars	AIHL	21	33	32	65	32	—	—	—	—	—
2015–16	HC Gherdëina	ITL	42	19	34	53	22	5	2	3	5	4
2016–17	Chamonix-Morzine	FRA	42	15	16	31	38	—	—	—	—	—
2017–18	Manchester Storm	EIHL	56	34	32	66	73	2	0	0	0	2
2018–19	Manchester Storm	EIHL	57	20	42	62	76	—	—	—	—	—
SHL totals			10	0	2	2	0	—	—	—	—	—

=== International ===
Year	Team	Event	Result	GP	G	A	Pts	PIM
2010	United States	WJC18	1st place, gold medalist(s)	7	2	1	3	2
Junior totals				7	2	1	3	2
