= Ivan Padělek =

Czech ice hockey forward

- Born: December 10, 1974 (age 50) Jihlava, Czechoslovakia
- Height: 6 ft 2 in (188 cm)
- Weight: 192 lb (87 kg; 13 st 10 lb)
- Position: Right wing
- Shot: Left
- Played for: HC Dukla Jihlava; HC Vsetín; HC Vítkovice; HC Oceláři Třinec; Amur Khabarovsk; HC Kometa Brno; HC Plzeň
- Playing career: 1992–2011

Ivan Padělek (born December 10, 1974) is a Czech former professional ice hockey right winger.

Padělek played in the Czech Extraliga for HC Dukla Jihlava, HC Vsetín, HC Vítkovice, HC Oceláři Třinec, HC Kometa Brno and HC Plzeň. He also played seventeen games for Amur Khabarovsk of the Russian Superleague during the 2006–07 season.

His younger brother Aleš Padělek is also a professional ice hockey player and the two were teammates whilst at Dukla Jihlava and Vítkovice.
