= AIHL All-Star Weekend =

2015 AIHL All-Star Game
	1	2	3	Total
Team Schlamp	4	2	1	7
Team Bales	1	1	1	3
- Date: 13 September 2015
- Arena: Hunter Ice Skating Stadium
- City: Newcastle, NSW, Australia
- MVP: Pat O'Kane
- Attendance: x

The Australian Ice Hockey League All-Star Weekend is an annual event showcasing the best talent from the AIHL in skills tests and an exhibition 'All-Stars' match.

== History ==
4 August 2015, the Australian Ice Hockey League (AIHL) announced the formation of a new event in the Australian ice hockey calendar, the AIHL All-Stars Weekend. The event occurs two weeks following the conclusion of the AIHL Finals Weekend.

The maiden Australian Ice Hockey League All-Star Weekend, took place between 12 and 13 September 2015 at Hunter Ice Skating Stadium in Newcastle, NSW.

Cash prizes are on offer for players for the breakaway challenge during the skills tests, the winner of the Most Valuable Player (MVP) in the All-Stars match and the team the MVP comes from. In 2015 the winner of the Breakaway Challenge received $1000, the winner of the MVP received $5000 and the MVP club received $4000.

== 2015 Rosters ==
Andrew Petrie and Joey Theriault of the Newcastle North Stars and Vlad Rubes and Ron Kuprowsky of the Sydney Bears were named as the coaching teams for the game.

Team Bales
#	Pos.	Player	Team	Nat.
1	G	Kamil Jarina	Sydney Bears	(Czech Republic)
20	G	Josh Broekman	Newcastle North Stars	(Australia)
2	D	John Kennedy	Newcastle North Stars	(United States)
3	D	Robert Haselhurst	Perth Thunder	(Australia)
4	D	Paddy Ward	Sydney Bears	(Scotland)
5	D	Shannon McGregor	Sydney Ice Dogs	(Australia)
6	D	Tomas Manco	CBR Brave	(Australia)
7	F	Matthew Lindsay	Newcastle North Stars	(Australia)
8	F	Wehebe Darge	Adelaide Adrenaline	(Australia)
9	F	Josef Rezek	Adelaide Adrenaline	(Australia)
10	F	Mitchell Humphries	Melbourne Ice	(Australia)
11	F	Brian Bales	Newcastle North Stars	(Australia)
12	F	Jordan Kyros	Perth Thunder	(Australia)
13	F	Andrew Cox	Perth Thunder	(New Zealand)
14	F	Kai Miettinen	CBR Brave	(Australia)
15	F	Luc Daigneault	Perth Thunder	(Canada)
16	F	Stephen Blunden	CBR Brave	(Canada)
21	F	Patrick Nadin*	Newcastle North Stars	(Australia)

Team Schlamp
#	Pos.	Player	Team	Nat.
1	G	Dayne Davis	Newcastle North Stars	(Canada)
20	G	Fraser Carson	Melbourne Mustangs	(Australia)
2	D	Bert Malloy	Newcastle North Stars	(Australia)
3	D	Jamie Woodman	Perth Thunder	(Australia)
4	D	Ric Del Basso	Perth Thunder	(Australia)
5	D	Daniel Pataki	Sydney Ice Dogs	(Australia)
6	D	Brian Funes	Sydney Ice Dogs	(Australia)
7	D	James Byers	CBR Brave	(Australia)
8	F	David Dunwoodie	CBR Brave	(New Zealand)
9	F	Matt Armstrong	Melbourne Ice	(Canada)
10	F	Tommy Powell	Melbourne Ice	(Australia)
11	F	Michael Schlamp	Sydney Bears	(Australia)
12	F	Pat O'Kane	Melbourne Mustangs	(United States)
13	F	Tomas Landa	Sydney Bears	(Czech Republic)
14	F	Joey Hughes	Melbourne Mustangs	(Australia)
15	F	Adrian Esposito	Sydney Bears	(Australia)
21	F	Matt Wetini	Newcastle North Stars	(Australia)
22	F	Vadim Virjassov*	Melbourne Mustangs	(Estonia)

* Denotes a player not originally selected in either All-Star team but played in the All-Stars match.

== Skills competition ==
The skills competitions selected for presentation by the respective coaches include a number of skills events the National Hockey League showcases at their All-Stars Weekend event. Each event is sponsored by one of the league's major sponsors and are performed on the Saturday afternoon.

=== Air Canada Fastest Skater competition ===
In this event, pairs of skaters raced each other simultaneously on parallel courses on the rink. The fastest two skaters then had a final race.

Heat	Team Bales	Verses	Team Schlamp
1	**Kieren Webster**	vs	Daniel Pataky
2	Mitch Humphries	vs	**Tommy Powell**
3	**Rob Haselhurst**	vs	Matt Wetini
4	Brian Bales	vs	**Matt Armstrong**
5	John Kennedy	vs	**Tomas Landa**
Final	**Rob Haselhurst**	vs	Matt Wetini
Event score: 3–3 Tied; Overall score: 3–3 Tied

- **bold** = Heat winner
- **Red & bold** = Event winner

=== APA Group Breakaway Challenge ===
The breakaway challenge saw three shooters and one goalie from each team take to the ice. Each skater was given 3 shots, with full access to the offensive zone, to play out their routine and take a shot. The winner was judged on their presentation as well as scoring by a fan shout off. In goals for Team Bales was Kamil Jarina (SB) and for Team Schlamp Dayne Davis (NNS).

Team Bales	Team Schlamp
**Brian Bales**	Brian Funes
Stephen Blunden	Michael Schlamp
Andrew Cox	James Byers
Event score: 1–0 Team Bales; Overall score: 4–3 Team Bales

- **Red & bold** = Event winner

=== Haigh and Hastings Shooting Accuracy competition ===
In this event, competitors were positioned in front of the net, and were passed the puck from two teammates situated behind the goal line. The players had to hit targets at the four corners of the net in the fastest time.

Heat	Team Bales	Time (sec)	Time (sec)	Team Schlamp
1	Mitch Humphries	43.6	21.5	**Matt Armstrong**
2	**Josef Rezek**	17.1	34.8	Robert Malloy
3	Luc Daigneault	51.4	34.8	**Adrian Esposito**
4	**Stephen Blunden**	19.5	30.2	Michael Schlamp
Final	**Josef Rezek**	20.37	29.97	Matt Armstrong
Event score: 3–2 Team Bales; Overall score: 7–5 Team Bales

- **bold** = Heat winner
- **Red & bold** = Event winner

=== Rifle Media Stickhandling competition ===
The stickhanding competition saw two skaters positioned in a head on head contest on identical obstacle courses that would test different styles of stick handling, first one to the finish line wins. There are four skaters in total selected by each team to compete.

Heat	Team Bales	Verses	Team Schlamp
1	Brian Bales	vs	**Jamie Woodman**
2	Shannon McGregor	vs	**Tommy Powell**
3	**Kai Miettinen**	vs	Daniel Pataky
4	Mitch Humphries	vs	**Adrian Esposito**
Final	Kai Miettinen	vs	**Tommy Powell**
Event score: 1–4 Team Schlamp; Overall score: 8–9 Team Schlamp

- **bold** = Heat winner
- **Red & bold** = Event winner

=== Skaters Network Hardest Shot competition ===
In this competition, four players from each team skate in from the blue line one at a time, and slap a puck as hard as possible into the net with a speed camera positioned behind the net to register the impact speed. Each player gets two attempts in the heats and the top two players face off in the final and get one attempt to win the event.

Heat	Team Bales	Speed (mph)	Speed (mph)	Team Schlamp
1	**Stephen Blunden**	83 & 83	79 & 83	Brian Funes
2	John Kennedy	85 & 85	96 & 85	**Matt Armstrong**
3	**Shannon McGregor**	85 & 74	84 & 81	Robert Malloy
4	**Rob Haselhurst**	83 & 79	83 & 76	Michael Schlamp
Final	John Kennedy	81	88	**Matt Armstrong**
Event score: 3–2 Team Bales; Overall score: 11–11 Tied

- **bold** = Heat winner
- **Red & bold** = Event winner

=== Ryzer Elimination Shootout ===
In this competition, players attempt to score on the opposing team's goalie. Players who score earn a point for their team for each goal they score. Players are eliminated from the competition if they fail to score.

Team Bales	Result	Result	Team Schlamp
Round 1
Brian Bales	Save	Goal	**Adrian Esposito**
Andrew Cox	Save	Save	Jamie Woodman
Kai Miettinen	Save	Save	Brian Funes
Stephen Blunden	Save	Goal	**Daniel Pataky**
John Kennedy	Save	Goal	**James Byers**
**Josef Rezek**	Goal	Save	Matt Armstrong
**Luc Daigneault**	Goal	Save	Tommy Powell
Robert Haselhurst	Save	Save	Michael Schlamp
Mitch Humphries	Save	Goal	**Matt Wetini**
Kieren Webster	Save	Save	Robert Malloy
Round 2
Josef Rezek	Save	Save	Adrian Esposito
Luc Daigneault	Save	Save	Daniel Pataky
		Save	James Byers
		Goal	**Matt Wetini**
Event score: 2–5 Team Schlamp; **Final overall score: 13–16 Team Schlamp**

- **bold** = Goal scorer
- **Red & bold** = Event winner

**Final Individual Winners Overview**
Event	Winner	Team
Air Canada Fastest Skater Competition	Rob Haselhurst (Perth Thunder)	Team Bales
APA Group Breakaway Challenge	Brian Bales (Newcastle North Stars)	Team Bales
Haigh & Hastings Shooting Accuracy Competition	Josef Rezek (Adelaide Adrenaline)	Team Bales
Rifle Media Stickhandling Competition	Tommy Powell (Melbourne Ice)	Team Schlamp
Skaters Network Fastest Shot Competition	Matt Armstrong (Melbourne Ice)	Team Schlamp
Ryzer Elimination Shootout	Matt Wetini (Newcastle North Stars)	Team Schlamp

== Game summary ==
The All-Star game sees a selection of the best players from the AIHL pitted against each other under than banner of two captains. The match is played on the Sunday afternoon.

Team Schlamp	7 – 3 (4–1, 2–1, 1–1)	Team Bales	Hunter Ice Skating Stadium (att); Newcastle
First period
Virjassov (Schlamp, Pataky) 11:21	Referees:
4:49 Blunden (Bales, Humphries)	Jeff Scott
Funes (Schlamp) 3:24	Linesmen:
O'Kane (Powell, Armstrong) 1:55	Grainge Phillips
O'Kane (2) (unassisted) 1:25	Official scorer:
Second period	Michelle Rutherford
10:14 Bales (Humphries, Nadin)	MVP: O'Kane (MM)
O'Kane (3) (Armstrong, Powell) 2:13
O'Kane (4) (Pataky) 1:49
Third period
Powell (O'Kane) 10:57
10:09 Nadin (Rezek, Webster)

- Shots on Goal:
  - Team Schlamp: 13 – 11 – 10 – Total: 34
  - Team Bales: 7 – 11 – 17 – Total: 35

Source: AIHL

== Broadcasting ==
Television: Fox Sports (part of the entire AIHL TV deal with Fox Sports). The AIHL released information that Fox Sports would broadcast the All-Stars Weekend event on their pay-television platform the following Thursday (17 September 2015).
