= 2012–13 AJIHL season =

- League: Australian Junior Ice Hockey League
- Sport: Ice hockey
- Duration: 20 October 2012 – 10 March 2013
- Number of games: 14
- Number of teams: 4
- Total attendance: 1,326

Regular season
- Premiers: Melbourne Red Wings
- Top scorer: Brendan McDowell (Red Wings)

AJIHL Champions Trophy
- Champions: Sydney Maple Leafs
- Runners-up: Melbourne Red Wings

AJIHL seasons
- ← Beginning 2013–14 →

The 2012–13 AJIHL season is the first season of the Australian Junior Ice Hockey League. It ran from 20 October 2012 until 17 February 2013, with the finals running from 3 March 2013 until 10 March 2013. The AJIHL is the highest Australian national junior ice hockey competition.

== League business ==
On 18 September 2012 Ice Hockey Australia announced the formation of the Australian Junior Ice Hockey League with the league starting its inaugural season on 20 October 2012. On 22 September 2012 they announced that the league would consist of four teams for the first season – Melbourne Blackhawks, Melbourne Red Wings, Sydney Lightning and the Sydney Maple Leafs, with teams being operated by their respective state governing body, the Victorian Ice Hockey Association and the New South Wales Ice Hockey Association respectively. Games are set to be held in the Melbourne, Penrith and Sydney.

Following the games on 9 December 2012 there is an eight-week stoppage to allow for the festive period and for the 2013 IIHF World U20 Championships program which runs from December until the end of January.

== Regular season ==
The regular season began on 20 October 2012 and ran through to 17 February 2013 before the teams compete in the playoff series.

=== October ===
Game	Date	Time	Away	Score	Home	Location	Attendance	Recap
1	20 October 2012	18:45	Sydney Lightning	3–5	Melbourne Blackhawks	Melbourne	150	
2	20 October 2012	20:30	Sydney Maple Leafs	2–7	Melbourne Red Wings	Melbourne	150	
3	21 October 2012	15:23	Sydney Maple Leafs	0–4	Melbourne Blackhawks	Melbourne	60	
4	21 October 2012	17:00	Sydney Lightning	5–3	Melbourne Red Wings	Melbourne	60	

=== November ===
Game	Date	Time	Away	Score	Home	Location	Attendance	Recap
6	9 November 2012	20:00	Melbourne Red Wings	1–2	Melbourne Blackhawks	Melbourne	75	
5	10 November 2012	19:00	Sydney Maple Leafs	0–4	Sydney Lightning	Penrith		
7	11 November 2012	17:00	Sydney Lightning	5–4	Sydney Maple Leafs	Penrith		
8	11 November 2012	14:30	Melbourne Blackhawks	3–4	Melbourne Red Wings	Melbourne	94	
10	23 November 2012	20:00	Melbourne Blackhawks	2–4	Melbourne Red Wings	Melbourne	52	
9	24 November 2012	19:00	Sydney Lightning	4–3 (SO)	Sydney Maple Leafs	Penrith		
11	25 November 2012	19:30	Sydney Maple Leafs	1–4	Sydney Lightning	Penrith		
12	25 November 2012	13:15	Melbourne Red Wings	3–1	Melbourne Blackhawks	Melbourne	75	

=== December ===
Game	Date	Time	Away	Score	Home	Location	Attendance	Recap
13	1 December 2012	17:00	Melbourne Blackhawks	4–3	Sydney Lightning	Penrith		
14	1 December 2012	18:45	Melbourne Red Wings	2–1	Sydney Maple Leafs	Penrith		
15	2 December 2012	08:30	Melbourne Blackhawks	6–3	Sydney Maple Leafs	Penrith		
16	2 December 2012	17:00	Melbourne Red Wings	2–3 (SO)	Sydney Lightning	Penrith		
18	7 December 2012	20:00	Melbourne Red Wings	2–4	Melbourne Blackhawks	Melbourne		
17	8 December 2012	17:00	Sydney Maple Leafs	2–1	Sydney Lightning	Penrith		
19	9 December 2012	17:00	Sydney Lightning	4–5	Sydney Maple Leafs	Penrith		
20	9 December 2012	13:15	Melbourne Blackhawks	5–2	Melbourne Red Wings	Melbourne		

=== February ===
Game	Date	Time	Away	Score	Home	Location	Attendance	Recap
21	2 February 2013	17:00	Sydney Lightning	2–1	Sydney Maple Leafs	Penrith		
22	2 February 2013	20:02	Melbourne Blackhawks	3–5	Melbourne Red Wings	Melbourne	84	
23	3 February 2013	17:00	Sydney Maple Leafs	3–4 (SO)	Sydney Lightning	Penrith		
24	3 February 2013	13:15	Melbourne Red Wings	3–1	Melbourne Blackhawks	Melbourne	59	
25	16 February 2013	17:00	Melbourne Blackhawks	4–0	Sydney Lightning	Penrith		
26	16 February 2013	18:45	Melbourne Red Wings	5–6	Sydney Maple Leafs	Penrith		
27	17 February 2013	08:30	Melbourne Red Wings	4–3	Sydney Lightning	Penrith		
28	17 February 2013	17:00	Melbourne Blackhawks	0–3	Sydney Maple Leafs	Penrith		

== Standings ==
Team	GP	W	OTW	OTL	L	GF	GA	GDF	PTS
Melbourne Red Wings	14	8	0	1	5	47	41	+6	25
Melbourne Blackhawks	14	8	0	0	6	44	36	+8	24
Sydney Lightning	14	5	3	0	6	45	41	+4	21
Sydney Maple Leafs	14	4	0	2	8	34	52	−18	14

== Player statistics ==
=== Scoring leaders ===
The following players led the league in regular season points.

Player	Team	GP	G	A	Pts	+/–	PIM
(Australia) Brendan McDowell	Melbourne Red Wings	14	26	7	33	+24	14
(Australia) Austin McKenzie	Melbourne Blackhawks	14	20	11	31	+26	48
(Australia) Matt Stringer	Melbourne Red Wings	12	10	12	22	+19	8
(Australia) Scott Clemie	Sydney Maple Leafs	14	10	7	17	+14	18
(Australia) Tyler Kubara	Sydney Maple Leafs	9	7	12	19	+16	2
(Australia) Paul Lazzarotto	Melbourne Blackhawks	14	11	7	18	+15	0
(Australia) Jack Carpenter	Melbourne Blackhawks	14	5	11	16	+14	46
(Australia) Todd Cameron	Sydney Lightning	11	7	8	15	+11	38
(Australia) Steven Naidovski	Sydney Maple Leafs	12	6	4	10	+8	24
(Australia) Chris Fahy	Melbourne Red Wings	8	0	10	10	+6	39

=== Leading goaltenders ===
The following goaltenders led the league in regular season goals against average.

Player	Team	GP	TOI	W	L	OTL	GA	SO	SV%	GAA
(Australia) McKenzie Hill	Melbourne Blackhawks	12	538:52	7	5	0	29	2	.836	2.77
(Australia) James McKendrick	Melbourne Red Wings	13	525:51	6	6	0	35	0	.844	3.00
(Australia) Rhett Kelly	Sydney Lightning	9	316:06	4	3	0	24	1	.847	3.08
(Australia) Jake Burgess	Sydney Maple Leafs	8	361:22	4	2	1	26	1	.845	3.24
(Australia) Marco Tomasello	Sydney Lightning	9	313:13	4	4	0	24	0	.793	3.33

== Playoffs ==
The 2013 playoffs started on 3 March 2013 with the final being held on 9 and 10 March 2013. Following the end of the regular season the teams will play their opposing state team in the semi-finals. The winners move on to play each other in a best-of-two final being held at the Medibank Icehouse in Melbourne. Melbourne Red Wings and Sydney Maple Leafs both progressed to the finals after winning their semi-final game. The Maple Leafs won the first game of the finals while the Red Wings won the second game tying the two game series. As a result, the two teams entered a sudden death overtime period. Scott Clemie scored the game-winning goal in the 13th minute of the period, with the Maple Leafs winning the first AJIHL season. Clemie was named the AJIHL Finals MVP.

=== Semi-finals ===
3 March 2013; 17:00	Sydney Maple Leafs	7–2 (2–0, 3–2, 2–0)	Sydney Lightning	Penrith Ice Palace

Game reference

3 March 2013; 15:00	Melbourne Red Wings	7–3 (1–1, 2–1, 4–1)	Melbourne Blackhawks	Medibank Icehouse; Attendance: 150

Game reference

=== Final ===
9 March 2013; 17:02	Melbourne Red Wings	2–7 (0–2, 1–2, 1–3)	Sydney Maple Leafs	Medibank Icehouse

Game reference

10 March 2013; 13:27	Sydney Maple Leafs	4–5 (OT) (2–1, 1–3, 1–0, 0–1)	Melbourne Red Wings	Medibank Icehouse; Attendance: 120

Game reference

10 March 2013; 15:20	Sydney Maple Leafs	1–0	Melbourne Red Wings	Medibank Icehouse; Attendance: 120

Game reference
