= Okotoks Drillers =

- City: Okotoks, Alberta, Canada
- League: Chinook Hockey League
- Founded: 2013
- Operated: 2013–2015
- Home arena: Scott Seaman Sports Rink
- Colours: Blue, orange, white

The Okotoks Drillers were a AAA senior men's ice hockey team based in Okotoks, Alberta, Canada, that competed in the Chinook Hockey League. The club was founded in 2013 as an AA affiliate of the Chinook Hockey League and gained AAA affiliate status in 2014 after winning the 2014 Investors Group Hockey Alberta Provincial Senior AA Championship. The Drillers played their home games at the Scott Seaman Sports Rink.

== History ==
The Drillers were formed in 2013 and joined the Chinook Hockey League (ChHL) as an expansion team for the 2013–14 season as an AA affiliate. The team competed in two games of the Chinook Hockey League's pre-season showcase tournament winning their opening game against the Innisfail Eagles and losing the second game to the Bentley Generals. The Drillers finished the regular season in fourth place, advancing to the 2014 Investors Group Hockey Alberta Provincials Senior AA/A tournament. The Drillers defeated the Morinville Kings in the quarterfinals of the tournament and advanced to the AA bracket semifinal against the Bonnyville Pontiacs. After defeating the Pontiacs 10-2 the Drillers advanced to the AA bracket final where they defeated the Daysland Northstars to win the AA tournament and gained AAA affiliate status for the 2014–15 season. The AAA status allowed the team to compete in the Chinook Hockey League's AAA playoffs and attempt to qualify for the Allan Cup tournament.

The Drillers started the 2014–15 season with two games in the Chinook Hockey League's pre-season classic tournament with games against the Innisfail Eagles and Stony Plain Eagles. The team improved on the previous year's ranking in the regular season finishing second in the standings behind the Bentley Generals. The Drillers were drawn against the Innisfail Eagles in their opening round of the playoffs where they lost the series, winning only one of the five games. In July 2015 the team announced that they were taking a one-year leave of absence from the ChHL due to financial issues however they are not expected to play in 2016–17 season either.

== Season-by-season results ==
Season	GP	W	L	OTL	PTS	GF	GA	Finish	Playoffs
2013–14	24	7	16	1	15	76	128	4th	Won 2014 Alberta Provincial Senior AA Championship defeated Daysland Northstars 4–1
2014–15	24	13	10	1	27	117	122	2nd	Lost in Chinook Hockey League AAA Playoff semifinal series, 1–4 (Innisfail Eagles)

== Roster ==
Updated 19 April 2015

#	Nat	Name	Pos	Age	Acquired	Birthplace
26	(Canada)	Curtis Beech	D	38	2014–15	Calgary, Alberta, Canada
61	(Canada)	Curtis Billsten (C)	F	39	2013–14	Calgary, Alberta, Canada
57	(Canada)	Aaron Boyer	F	42	2014–15	Calgary, Alberta, Canada
8	(Canada)	Travis Bradshaw	F	38	2013–14	Calgary, Alberta, Canada
82	(Canada)	Jeremy Chadsey	F	43	2014–15	Chilliwack, British Columbia, Canada
31	(Canada)	Dan Dunn	G	38	2014–15	Oshawa, Ontario, Canada
31	(Canada)	Adam Melon	G	41	2013–14	Calgary, Alberta, Canada
17	(Canada)	Campbell Elynuik	F	33	2014–15	Calgary, Alberta, Canada
18	(Canada)	Derek Endicott	F	42	2013–14	Saskatoon, Saskatchewan, Canada
29	(Canada)	Gerry Festa	G	42	2014–15	Calgary, Alberta, Canada
34	(Canada)	Todd Ford	G	42	2013–14	Calgary, Alberta, Canada
9	(Canada)	Adrian Foster	F	44	2014–15	Lethbridge, Alberta, Canada
48	(Canada)	Branden Gay	F	40	2013–14	Calgary, Alberta, Canada
14	(Canada)	Tanner House	F	40	2014–15	Cochrane, Alberta, Canada
4	(Canada)	Clay Howe	D	34	2014–15	Lethbridge, Alberta, Canada
12	(Canada)	Mike Kneeland	F	42	2014–15	Calgary, Alberta, Canada
55	(Canada)	Paul Kurceba	D	39	2014–15	Calgary, Alberta, Canada
15	(Canada)	Keaton Lackten	D	34	2013–14	High River, Alberta, Canada
1	(Canada)	Todd-Daniel Lafontaine	G	49	2014–15	
11	(Canada)	Justis Lowry	F	30	2014–15	Rocky Mountain House, Alberta, Canada
25	(Canada)	Curtis Martin	D		2014–15	Okotoks, Alberta, Canada
2	(Canada)	Mitch McColm	D	37	2013–14	Calgary, Alberta, Canada
7	(Canada)	Clinton Pettapiece	F	39	2014–15	Christina Lake, British Columbia, Canada
96	(Canada)	Alexander Pronchuk	F	34	2013–14	Calgary, Alberta, Canada
10	(Canada)	Kyle Reed	F	39	2013–14	Calgary, Alberta, Canada
5	(Canada)	Justin Schmit	D	41	2014–15	Strathmore, Alberta, Canada
79	(Canada)	Jesse Todd	F	39	2014–15	Calgary, Alberta, Canada
20	(Canada)	Jessie Tresierra	D	38	2014–15	Quesnel, British Columbia, Canada
6	(Canada)	Joe Vetere	D	39	2014–15	Calgary, Alberta, Canada

== Notable alumni ==
- Adrian Foster
