= Aleš Padělek =

Czech ice hockey player

Ales Padelek
- Born: 1 January 1980 (age 46) Jihlava, Czechoslovakia
- Height: 1.8 m (5 ft 11 in)
- Weight: 88 kg (194 lb; 13 st 12 lb)
- Position: Forward
- Shoots: Left
- Czech 2.liga team Former teams: BK Havlíčkův Brod; HC Vítkovice Ridera; HC Slezan Opava; HC Ytong Brno; HC Sumperk; HC Dukla Jihlava; HC Lasselsberger Plzen; HC Znojemsti Orli; HC Energie Karlovy Vary; BK Mlada Boleslav; SK Horacka Slavia Trebic; HC Tábor; Orli Znojmo; HC Banska Bystrica; HC Berounští Medvědi; Slough Jets; HC Zdar nad Sazavou; LHK Jestřábi Prostějov; BK Havlíčkův Brod; Sydney Bears; Peterborough Phantoms
- NHL draft: Undrafted
- Playing career: 1997–present

Aleš Padělek (born 1 January 1980) is a Czech ice hockey left wing for BK Havlíčkův Brod of the 2nd Czech Republic Hockey League. He previously spent five seasons playing for the Peterborough Phantoms.

He has represented Czech Republic internationally.

== Personal life ==
Padělek's older brother Ivan is a retired right wing who played in the Czech Extraliga.

== Career statistics ==
=== Regular season and playoffs ===
			Regular season					Playoffs
Season	Team	League	GP	G	A	Pts	PIM	GP	G	A	Pts	PIM
1997–98	HC Dukla Jihlava	Czech Extraliga	34	3	3	6	8	—	—	—	—	—
1997–98	BK Havlíčkův Brod	Czech2	3	1	0	1	0	—	—	—	—	—
1998–99	HC Dukla Jihlava U20	Czech U20	?	?	?	?	?	—	—	—	—	—
1998–99	HC Dukla Jihlava	Czech Q	—	—	—	—	—	1	0	0	0	0
1998–99	HC Dukla Jihlava	Czech Extraliga	19	0	4	4	2	—	—	—	—	—
1999–00	HC Dukla Jihlava U20	Czech U20	17	11	12	23	24	—	—	—	—	—
1999–00	HC Dukla Jihlava	Czech2	15	0	1	1	2	—	—	—	—	—
2000–01	HC Vitkovice	Czech Extraliga	7	0	0	0	0	—	—	—	—	—
2000–01	HC Vitkovice U20	Czech U20	14	11	11	22	0	—	—	—	—	—
2000–01	HC Slezan Opava	Czech2	6	2	0	2	2	—	—	—	—	—
2000–01	HC Ytong Brno	Czech2	20	3	2	5	2	—	—	—	—	—
2000–01	HC Ytong Brno	Czech2 Q	—	—	—	—	—	8	2	4	6	8
2001–02	HC Vitkovice	Czech Extraliga	39	6	8	14	10	13	1	2	3	6
2001–02	HC Sumperk	Czech2	9	5	5	10	6	—	—	—	—	—
2002–03	HC Vitkovice	Czech Extraliga	46	5	8	13	6	6	0	0	0	0
2003–04	HC Vitkovice	Czech Extraliga	30	1	6	7	4	—	—	—	—	—
2003–04	HC Dukla Jihlava	Czech2	?	?	?	?	?	12	8	2	10	0
2003–04	HC Dukla Jihlava	Czech Q	—	—	—	—	—	4	3	2	5	0
2004–05	HC Dukla Jihlava	Czech Extraliga	51	10	13	23	20	—	—	—	—	—
2004–05	HC Dukla Jihlava	Czech Q	—	—	—	—	—	5	1	1	2	4
2005–06	HC Lasselsberger Plzen	Czech Extraliga	52	21	13	34	36	—	—	—	—	—
2006–07	HC Lasselsberger Plzen	Czech Extraliga	20	2	2	4	10	—	—	—	—	—
2006–07	HC Znojemsti Orli	Czech Extraliga	24	9	7	16	10	7	1	2	3	2
2006–07	HC Dukla Jihlava	Czech2	1	0	0	0	0	—	—	—	—	—
2007–08	HC Znojemsti Orli	Czech Extraliga	32	5	5	10	12	—	—	—	—	—
2007–08	HC Energie Karlovy Vary	Czech Extraliga	10	2	2	4	0	1	0	0	0	0
2008–09	BK Mlada Boleslav	Czech Extraliga	29	4	9	13	24	12	0	2	2	8
2008–09	BK Mlada Boleslav	Czech Q	—	—	—	—	—	4	0	0	0	4
2008–09	SK Horácká Slavia Třebíč	Czech2	1	1	1	2	0	1	1	0	1	0
2009–10	HC Tabor	Czech2	22	4	6	10	12	—	—	—	—	—
2009–10	Orli Znojmo	Czech2	39	5	7	12	18	—	—	—	—	—
2009–10	HC Banska Bystrica	Tipsport Liga	14	6	0	6	4	6	0	2	2	1
2010–11	BK Mlada Boleslav	Czech Extraliga	1	1	0	1	0	2	1	0	1	0
2010–11	HC Dukla Jihlava	Czech2	44	18	7	25	14	7	2	2	4	10
2011–12	HC Dukla Jihlava	Czech2	31	8	15	23	4	10	2	3	5	4
2012–13	BK Mlada Boleslav	Czech2	20	1	4	5	6	—	—	—	—	—
2012–13	HC Berounští Medvědi	Czech2	28	7	10	17	20	4	0	1	1	2
2012–13	HC Berounští Medvědi	Czech2 Q	—	—	—	—	—	6	4	4	8	4
2013–14	Slough Jets	EPIHL	51	32	16	36	20	—	—	—	—	—
2014–15	HC Zdar nad Sazavou	Czech3	26	20	16	36	20	6	5	1	6	6
2014–15	LHK Jestrabi Prostejov	Czech2	1	0	0	0	0	—	—	—	—	—
2014–15	BK Havlíčkův Brod	Czech2	8	5	0	5	8	4	1	0	1	2
2014–15	Sydney Bears	AIHL	17	12	14	26	6	—	—	—	—	—
2015–16	Peterborough Phantoms	EPIHL	53	35	28	63	10	3	1	3	4	2
2016–17	Peterborough Phantoms	EPIHL	54	35	30	65	18	6	1	5	6	0
2017–18	Peterborough Phantoms	NIHL 1	28	18	19	37	10	6	6	2	8	4
2018–19	Peterborough Phantoms	NIHL 1	39	34	29	63	54	6	6	7	13	12
2019–20	Peterborough Phantoms	NIHL	4	1	3	4	0	—	—	—	—	—

=== International ===
Year	Team	Event	Result	GP	G	A	Pts	PIM
1997-98	Czech Republic U18	EJC-18	?	6	0	3	3	0
2005–06	Czech Republic	International	?	2	0	0	0	0

== Awards and honours ==
Awards	Year
Czech Extraliga
Czech Silver Medal	2001–02
Czech2
Czech2 Champion	2003–04
Czech2 Playoffs Most Goals	2003–04
Czech2 to Czech Promotion	2003–04
NIHL
NIHL South Cup Champion	2018–19
NIHL South Most Goals	2018–19
NIHL South Playoff Champion	2018–19
