= Josh Unice =

American ice hockey player and coach

- Born: June 24, 1989 (age 37) Holland, Ohio, U.S.
- Height: 6 ft 1 in (185 cm)
- Weight: 179 lb (81 kg; 12 st 11 lb)
- Position: Goaltender
- Caught: Left
- AIHL team: CBR Brave
- Played for: Sheffield Steelers; HC Banska Bystrica; Gwinnett Gladiators; Western Ontario Mustangs; Windsor Spitfires; Kitchener Rangers
- NHL draft: 86th overall, 2007; Chicago Blackhawks
- Playing career: 2014–2015

Medal record

Ice hockey

Representing United States

IIHF World U18 Championship
| Silver medal – second place | 2006 Saskatchewan | Team |

IIHF World U18 Championship
| Silver medal – second place | 2007 Finland | Team |

Josh Unice (born June 24, 1989) is an American former professional ice hockey goaltender.

Unice was selected by the Chicago Blackhawks in the 3rd round (86th overall) of the 2007 NHL entry draft.

== Playing career ==
=== Youth career ===
Unice began his career playing two seasons with the USA Hockey National Team Development Program (2005–07), before playing three seasons in the Ontario Hockey League playing with both the Kitchener Rangers and Windsor Spitfires (2007–09). While with the Spitfires, the team won the Ontario Hockey League Championship after the 2008-09 season.

=== University career ===
After his junior career ended, Unice spent his college ice hockey career playing for the University of Western Ontario Mustangs of Canadian Interuniversity Sport for five seasons (2009–2014). While at the University of Western Ontario, Unice studied Criminology.

=== Senior career ===
On March 6, 2014, Unice began his professional career by signing with the Gwinnett Gladiators of the ECHL. On August 7, 2014, Unice signed with the Missouri Mavericks of the Central Hockey League.

On October 7, 2014, it was announced that the Central Hockey League had folded and had joined the ECHL, nullifying Unice's Central Hockey League contract with the team. On October 9, 2014, Unice re-signed with the Mavericks under an ECHL contract. That same day, he was traded by the Mavericks to the Rapid City Rush of the ECHL for undisclosed considerations.

On October 15, 2014, Unice was released by the Rush.

24 January 2015, Unice signed with Elite Ice Hockey League side Sheffield Steelers on a short-term contract to cover the injured first-choice netminder Frank Doyle. Josh slotted into the first team well at the Steelers and finished the season by winning the league with the best save percentage out of any goaltender in the EIHL. Following his success with the Steelers in April 2015 retiring goaltender Frank Doyle made a public statement endorsing Unice by saying he felt Josh would be the ideal replacement for him at the Steelers for the next EIHL season.

1 May 2015, Josh Unice signed with the CBR Brave and became the club's starting goaltender. Unice is the first NHL drafted player to play for the Brave. Josh made his CBR Brave debut between the pipes in round one of the 2015 AIHL season as the Brave beat the Sydney Bears 4–2 in front of a sold-out crowd at Phillip Ice Centre.

14 July 2015, Josh Unice was named CBR Brave interim head coach for the last seven games of the 2015 AIHL regular season and any finals matches. Josh was installed head coach after being approached by Brave chairman Peter Chamberlain following the mutual separation between the club and former head coach Brad Hunt. Joining Josh in the coaching department as Josh's right-hand man is veteran Brave defenceman and alternative captain Aaron Clayworth who has taken the assistant coaching position.

On 9 March 2016, Josh Unice was named as the permanent 2016 CBR Brave head coach for the 2016 AIHL season. Josh was once again joined by experienced assistant coach Dave Rogina and strength and conditioning trainer Stuart Philps.

== Awards and honors ==
- 2006 World U-17 Hockey Challenge Silver Medal
- 2007 IIHF World U18 Championships All-Star
- 2007 IIHF World U18 Championships Best Goaltender
- 2007 IIHF World U18 Championships Silver Medal
- 2007–08 CHL Goaltender of the Week (October 28, 2007)
- 2007–08 F.W. "Dinty" Moore Trophy Winner (best rookie Goals against average)
- 2007–08 Ontario Hockey League First All-Rookie Team
- 2008–09 J. Ross Robertson Cup Champion (OHL champions) - Windsor Spitfires
- 2009 Memorial Cup Champions - Windsor Spitfires
- 2011–12 CIS (OUA West) First All-Star Team
- 2011–12 CIS University Cup All-Tournament Team
- 2012–13 CIS (OUA West) Second All-Star Team
- 2013–14 CIS (OUA West) First All-Star Team
- EIHL League Champion 14/15

== Career statistics ==
=== Regular season ===
| Season | Team | League | GP | W | L | T | MIN | GA | SO | GAA |
|---|---|---|---|---|---|---|---|---|---|---|
| 2004–05 | Victory Honda | MWEHL | 17 | 4 | 11 | 0 | 802 | 62 | 0 | 4.17 |
| 2005-06 | United States NTDP U17 | Ind | 6 | 2 | 3 | 1 | - | 23 | - | 3.79 |
| 2005–06 | United States NTDP | NAHL | 21 | 11 | 7 | 0 | 1245:49 | 62 | 0 | 2.99 |
| 2006-07 | United States NTDP U18 | Ind | 27 | 15 | 9 | 2 | 1582 | 83 | 3 | 3.15 |
| 2006–07 | United States NTDP | NAHL | 6 | 5 | 0 | 0 | 368:31 | 13 | 1 | 2.12 |
| 2007–08 | Kitchener Rangers | OHL | 42 | 30 | 6 | 0 | 2376 | 97 | 4 | 2.45 |
| 2008–09 | Kitchener Rangers | OHL | 16 | 4 | 10 | 0 | 876 | 56 | 0 | 3.84 |
| 2008–09 | Windsor Spitfires | OHL | 12 | 7 | 5 | 0 | 674 | 30 | 0 | 2.67 |
| 2009–10 | Windsor Spitfires | OHL | 3 | 0 | 1 | 0 | 53 | 9 | 0 | 10.27 |
| 2009–10 | Western Mustangs | OUA | 5 | 1 | 3 | 0 | 236:39 | 19 | 0 | 4.82 |
| 2010–11 | Western Mustangs | OUA | 14 | 8 | 5 | 0 | 810 | 30 | 1 | 2.22 |
| 2011–12 | Western Mustangs | OUA | 20 | 15 | 4 | 0 | 1140 | 40 | 4 | 2.10 |
| 2012–13 | Western Mustangs | OUA | 24 | 19 | 5 | 0 | 1451 | 59 | 1 | 2.44 |
| 2013–14 | Western Mustangs | OUA | 21 | 16 | 4 | 0 | 1221 | 52 | 1 | 2.56 |
| 2013–14 | Gwinnett Gladiators | ECHL | 4 | 0 | 3 | 1 | 204 | 14 | 0 | 4.11 |
| 2014–15 | HC Banska Bystrica | SEL | 2 | - | - | - | 72 | - | 0 | 3.33 |
| 2014–15 | Sheffield Steelers | EIHL | 19 | 14 | 5 | 0 | 1126 | 39 | 5 | 2.80 |
| 2015 | CBR Brave | AIHL | 14 | 6 | 8 | 0 | 679 | 42 | 0 | 3.09 |
| OHL totals | | | 73 | 41 | 22 | 0 | 3979 | 192 | 4 | 2.90 |

=== Playoffs ===
| Season | Team | League | GP | W | L | T | MIN | GA | SO | GAA |
|---|---|---|---|---|---|---|---|---|---|---|
| 2005–06 | United States NTDP | NAHL | 8 | 5 | 3 | 0 | 489.32 | 14 | 2 | 1.72 |
| 2006–07 | United States NTDP | NAHL | 0 | 0 | 0 | 0 | 0:00 | 0 | 0 | 0 |
| 2007–08 | Kitchener Rangers | OHL | 16 | 11 | 3 | 0 | 948 | 38 | 1 | 2.41 |
| 2008–09 | Windsor Spitfires | OHL | 3 | 2 | 1 | 0 | 114 | 6 | 0 | 3.15 |
| 2009–10 | Western Mustangs | CIS | 0 | 0 | 0 | 0 | 0 | 0 | 0 | 0 |
| 2010–11 | Western Mustangs | CIS | 0 | 0 | 0 | 0 | 0 | 0 | 0 | 0 |
| 2011–12 | Western Mustangs | CIS | 11 | 8 | 3 | 0 | 669 | 26 | 1 | 2.33 |
| 2012–13 | Western Mustangs | CIS | 4 | 3 | 1 | 0 | 240 | 8 | 1 | 2.00 |
| 2013–14 | Western Mustangs | CIS | 6 | 3 | 3 | 0 | 381 | 14 | 0 | 2.20 |
| OHL totals | | | 19 | 13 | 5 | 0 | 504 | 44 | 1 | 2.49 |

=== Memorial Cup ===
| Season | Team | League | GP | W | L | T | MIN | GA | SO | GAA |
|---|---|---|---|---|---|---|---|---|---|---|
| 2008 | Windsor Spitfires | MEM | 5 | 2 | 2 | 0 | 316 | 14 | 1 | 2.66 |
