= East Coast Super League =

Australian ice hockey league

- Sport: Ice hockey
- Founded: 2002
- First season: 2002
- No. of teams: 6
- Country: Australia
- Most recent champion: Polyflor Raptors
- Most titles: Newcastle North Stars (3); Reach Rebels (3); Sydney Sting (3)
- Related competitions: Australian Ice Hockey League
- Website: ECSLhockey.com

The East Coast Super League (ECSL) is an ice hockey league in New South Wales, Australia. The league was formed in 2002 by New South Wales Ice Hockey's amalgamation of the former Junior and Senior A leagues. It is Australia's second highest level of ice hockey, and acts as a bridge between junior leagues and the AIHL. Five of the teams are based in Sydney and one is based in Newcastle.

== History ==
The East Coast Super League (ECSL) was formed in 2002 by New South Wales Ice Hockey following the amalgamation of the former Junior and Senior A leagues. The league started with four clubs, with the Raptors winning the inaugural title. The 2003 ECSL finals were won by the Sydney Heat and in 2004 the Raptors won their second title. In 2005 the ECSL expanded to six clubs and also marked the first expansion outside of Sydney, with the Australian Ice Hockey League's (AIHL) Newcastle North Stars entering a farm team into the competition. The North Stars went on to win in their debut season and won again in 2007, with the Ice Breakers winning the 2006 ECSL final in between the North Stars two years of titles. After expanding in 2006 the league dropped back down to four teams with two teams leaving the league including the previous ECSL champions the Raptors. The Ice Breakers won their second title in 2008 and in 2009 the Sting won the first ECSL final. The 2009 season also saw the Penrith Raptors enter the league, taking on the name of the previous Raptors club. In 2010 the Central Coast Rhinos entered the league after leaving the AIHL before the start of the 2009 season. They finished the regular season in first place however were knocked out of the playoffs in the semifinal round, with the Penrith Raptors going on to win the 2010 playoffs. The Rhinos and Ice Breakers both left the league at the end of the season and were replaced by the Vipers and Reach Rebels respectively for the 2011 season. The Rebels won the finals in their debut season and in 2012 the North Stars won their third title. In 2013 the Sting won the playoffs, their first since 2009. The Vipers folded at the end of the 2013 season and were replaced by the Blueline Bombers for the start of the 2014 season. The 2014 regular season was won by the Reach Rebels who also went on to win the playoffs, defeating the Sting two games to one. The Rebels claimed back to back regular season titles, finishing the 2015 season in first place with 31 points. The Rebels advanced to the grand final series after defeating the Penrith Raptors in the semifinals and faced off against the Sting who had beat the Newcastle North Stars in their semifinal. The Sting went on to defeat the Rebels in two games, claiming their third Championship title.

In February 2016 it was announced that the Sydney Heat had folded following an instruction from Ice Hockey NSW to the ECSL to reduce the league to five teams for the 2016 season. Some of the Heat's former players were signed by the other clubs in the league including the Blueline Bombers who picked up eight players. The Heat also announced their intention to return to the league in the future. The Sting changed their name to the Sydney Sting for the start of the 2016 season and introduced a new logo and jersey. The 2016 regular season was won by the Rebels who claimed their third title overall. The Rebels advanced to the grand final series after defeating the Blueline Bombers in the semifinals. They faced off against the Sydney Sting who had defeated the North Stars to advance. The Rebels were awarded the cup following the forfeit of the Sting for playing an ineligible player in Game 2 of the series.

== Rules & season structure ==
The ECSL is played under International Ice Hockey Federation rules and incorporates some modifications from Ice Hockey Australia as well as some of its own special rules. Games are played with three twenty minute running time periods with only the last five minutes using a stop clock. Team rosters must have at least 40% of their players aged 25-and-under. Players aged 23 or older are limited to playing five Australian Ice Hockey League (AIHL) games. Once they have exceeded this limit they are not permitted to return to the ECSL until the following season. There is no cap on the number of AIHL games a player under the age of 23 can play. The minimum age for players to compete in the ECSL is 17. Midget-aged players playing in both the ECSL and in Midget competition must prioritise Midget competition if there is a schedule clash. Full-time rostered players must have competed in a minimum of seven ECSL regular season games to be eligible for the playoffs. Players competing in either the AIHL or a Midget competition must have played a minimum of five games in the ECSL and seven games in their other league to be eligible for the playoffs.

The league runs a 20-game season followed by a playoff series. The semifinals are a two-game series which uses a cumulative aggregate format to determine the winner. The grand final series uses a best of three game format. If after Game 2 in the semifinals or after Game 3 in the grand finals the series is a draw the games will go into continuous overtime.

== Teams ==
Team	City	Joined	Notes
Sydney Bombers	Liverpool, New South Wales	2014	
Sydney Heat	Mascot, New South Wales	2002	Returned in 2021 after hiatus from 2015-2020
Newcastle North Stars	Newcastle, New South Wales	2005	
Polyflor Raptors	Penrith, New South Wales	2009	
Reach Rebels	Sydney, New South Wales	2011	
Sydney Sting ^{a}	Sydney, New South Wales	2002	Formally known as the Sting from 2002–2015

^{a}: Currently dormant

=== Former teams ===
- Central Coast Rhinos, 2010
- Ice Breakers, 2002–2011
- Raptors, 2002–2006
- Vipers, 2011–2013

== Season results ==
The ECSL championship has been won 20 times by seven different clubs.

- 2002 – Raptors
- 2003 – Sydney Heat
- 2004 – Raptors
- 2005 – Newcastle North Stars
- 2006 – Ice Breakers
- 2007 – Newcastle North Stars
- 2008 – Ice Breakers
- 2009 – Sting
- 2010 – Penrith Raptors
- 2011 – Reach Rebels
- 2012 – Newcastle North Stars
- 2013 – Sting
- 2014 – Reach Rebels
- 2015 – Sting
- 2016 – Reach Rebels
- 2017 – Sting
- 2018 – Newcastle North Stars
- 2019 – Raptors
- 2020 – Polyflor Raptors
- 2021 – Season not completed due to COVID-19 pandemic
- 2022 – Polyflor Raptors
- 2023 – Newcastle North Stars
- 2024 – Sydney Bombers

== See also ==
- Australian Ice Hockey League
