= Women's ice hockey in Australia =

- Country: Australia
- National team: Australia
- Nickname: Mighty Jills

In 1940, a study of 314 women in New Zealand and Australia was done. Most of the women in the study were middle class, conservative, Protestant and white. The study found that 183 participated in sport. The twenty-fourth most popular sport that these women participated in was ice hockey, with one woman having played the sport. The sport was tied with baseball and bowls.

In 1983, the Australian Ice Hockey League dealt with the issue of Karen Sommerville trying to compete in a men's ice hockey league by amending the organisation's constitution to prohibit mixed gendered competitions. The organisation cited a need to protect women from harm, and stated that their decision "has nothing to do with sexism or discrimination".

In 1984, 98% of registered Australian ice hockey players were men: Only 2%, 60 total, were female. During the 1970s, 1980s and 1990s, women's ice hockey saw a large expansion in the number of competitors.

The Australian women's national ice hockey team represents Australia at the International Ice Hockey Federation's IIHF World Women's Championships. The women's national team is controlled by Ice Hockey Australia. As of 2011, Australia has 313 female players. Australia is ranked 29th out of 37 countries in the IIHF World Ranking, as of October 2015.

== History ==
The Adelaide Glaciarium (also known as Ice Palace Skating Rink) was the first indoor ice skating facility built in Australia. Opened in 1904, this is the birthplace for ice skating in Australia and is the location of the first hockey on the ice match in the country, which was an adaptation of roller polo for the ice using ice skates. Contemporary ice hockey was never played at this venue but this ice skating rink, the country's first, provided the "test bed" facility for its successor the Melbourne Glaciarium, the birthplace of ice hockey in Australia.

In 2000 Australia first competed in the qualification tournament held for the right to participate in the 2001 Division I championships. Australia lost all three of their group matches and finished seventh out of eight after beating South Africa in the seventh place game. The following year Australia again played in the qualification tournament in order to be promoted to Division I for the 2003 championships. Australia finished third in the group of five which saw Slovakia promoted to Division I for 2003.

In 2003 the International Ice Hockey Federation (IIHF) introduced a new format for the World Championships with the inclusion of second and third division. Australia was placed in the third division and gained promotion to the 2004 Division II tournament after winning four of their five games and finishing on top of the standings. The 2004 World Championships saw Australia relegated along with Great Britain from Division II to Division III for the 2005 tournament.

At the 2005 World Championships Australia competed in Division III and narrowly avoided relegation to Division IV after finishing fifth out of six teams, beating only South Africa. The next World Championship in 2007, Australia improved, again gaining promotion to Division II for the next years tournament. Promotion to Division II however was again short as Australia finished last in the 2007 tournament and were relegated back to Division III. Australia ice hockey team has never qualified for an Olympic tournament.

== Women's ice hockey today ==
The Australian Ice Hockey Federation, currently trading as Ice Hockey Australia (IHA), is the official national governing body of ice hockey in Australia and is a member of the International Ice Hockey Federation. It was first established in 1908, making it one of the oldest national ice hockey associations in the world.

The Australian Women's Ice Hockey League (AWIHL) is an amateur women's ice hockey league in Australia. This league represents the highest level national competition for women's hockey and is currently represented in four states: South Australia, Queensland, New South Wales and Victoria. The Joan McKowen Memorial Trophy is awarded annually to the league playoff champion at the end of each season.

== Teams ==
There are Currently 4 teams in the AWIHL, representing the Australian cities Brisbane, Melbourne, Adelaide and Sydney.

Teams currently in the AWIHL.

| Team | City/Area | Arena | Coordinates | Founded | Joined | Former Name |
Australian Women's Ice Hockey League
| Melbourne Ice | Melbourne, VIC | O'Brien Group Arena | 37.8124°S 144.9356°E | 2006 | | Melbourne Dragons (2006-2010) |
| Adelaide Adrenaline | Adelaide, SA | Ice Arena (Adelaide) | 34.919653°S 138.578596°E | 2006 | | Adelaide Assassins (2006-2010) |
| Brisbane Goannas | Brisbane, QLD | Ice World Boondall | 27.340352°S 153.05831°E | 2006 | | |
| Sydney Sirens | Sydney, NSW | Sydney Ice Arena | 33.732162°S 150.961799°E | 2006 | | North Star Sirens (2011-2013) |

It is anticipated that the league will grow to five or six teams in the future. It has been speculated that New Zealand may join the league in the upcoming years.

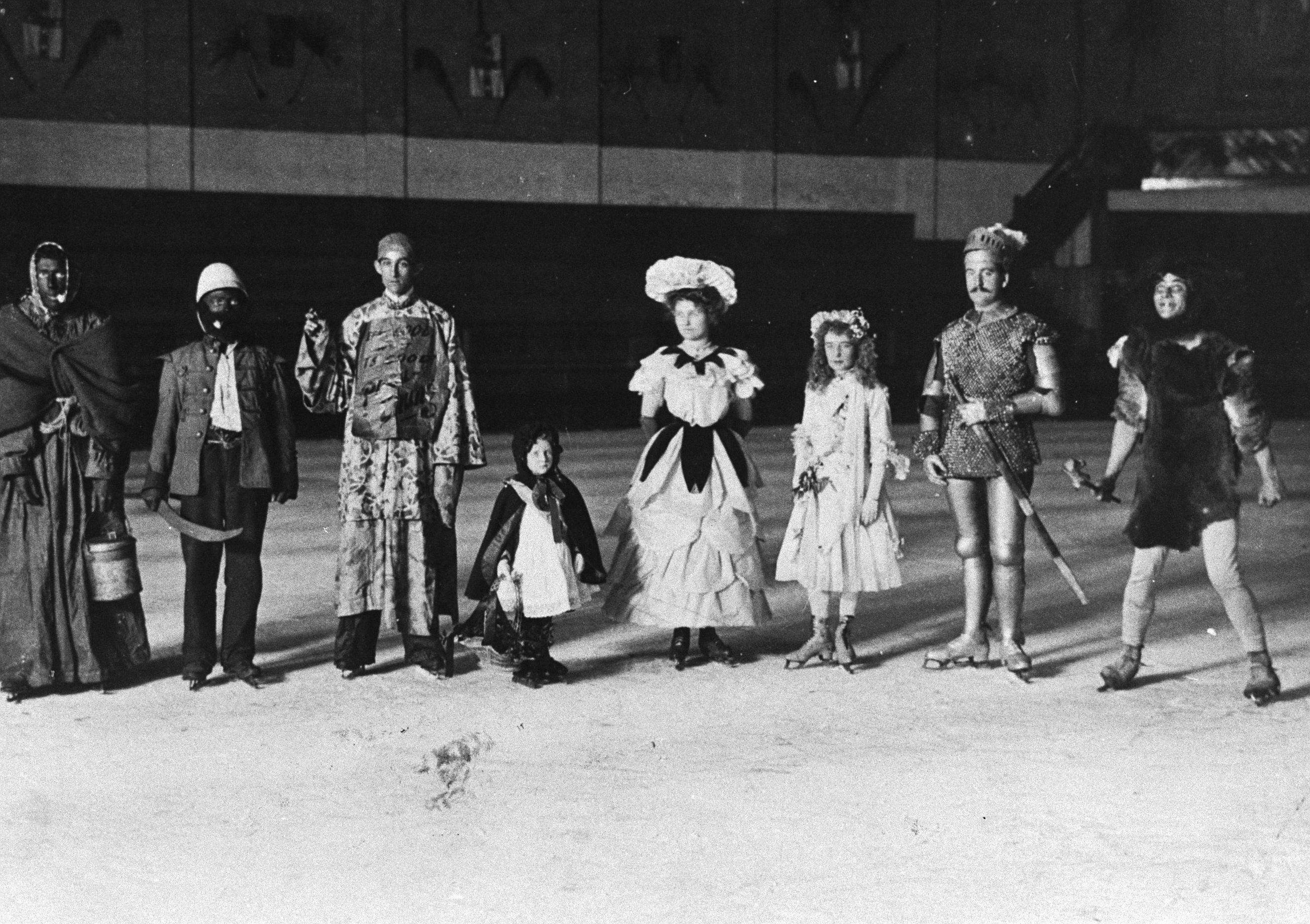
1905 – Skaters in fancy dress at the Glaciarium. State Library of South Australia B 62204

=== Team history ===
==== Adelaide Adrenaline ====
Starting their time in the Australian Women's Ice Hockey League as the Adelaide Assassins, the team began by winning the finals championship for the first 5 years in a row. The Assassins were renamed the Adelaide Adrenaline when they became part of the existing club that had a men's team in the national competition, the Australian Ice Hockey League in the 2011–2012 season.

==== Brisbane Goannas ====
Queensland is represented by the Brisbane Goannas in the Australian Women's Ice Hockey League.

==== Melbourne Ice ====
Victoria was originally represented by the Melbourne Dragons in the Australian Women's Ice Hockey League up until 2010 when they were renamed the Melbourne Ice, sharing their name with one of Melbourne's national men's teams in the Australian Ice Hockey League. From 2010, the Melbourne Ice home stadium was the Medibank Icehouse, which was renamed as of September 1, 2015 the O'Brien Group Arena.

==== Sydney Sirens ====
The Sydney Sirens were one of the four founding teams in the Australian Women's Ice Hockey League and represent New South Wales. From 2011 to 2013 the Sydney Sirens were known as the North Star Sirens but reverted to their original name which they presently use.

Perth Inferno

Perth Inferno entered the league as an expansion team in the 2018-2019 season. The team was originally founded around the state team for WA in 2016. Perth has made every Finals weekend since their entrance to the league

== Formation of Under 18's team ==
The Australia women's national under-18 ice hockey team was formed in 2012 in order to qualify and compete in the IIHF World Women's U18 Championships. The team held its first training camp in September 2012 in Adelaide, South Australia and in January 2013 held another training camp in Brisbane, Queensland. Tamra Jones was named as the team's first head coach with Jo Frankenberger as her assistant. Following the two camps, 14 players and one goalie were included on the team roster. The team played their first game on 6 December 2013 against the New Zealand women's national under-18 ice hockey team in Dunedin, New Zealand, tying 2-2. It was part of a four-game series being held in Dunedin between the two teams. Australia went on to lose the remaining three games of the series. In December 2014 Australia hosted the New Zealand women's national under-18 ice hockey team for a five-game series at the Medibank Icehouse in Melbourne. The team won the series three games to two and were awarded the 2014 Trans-Tasman Cup. They also recorded their largest international win in game four, defeating New Zealand 8-1. In August 2015 Australia competed in two games against the Denmark women's national under-18 ice hockey team as part of their 2015 Denmark Tour which also included a training camp that had begun on 25 July. Australia lost the opening game 2-12 with Natalie Ayris and Madison Poole scoring the team's two goals. In the second game of the tour Australia lost 1-9 with Emily Davis-Tope scoring the only goal on the third period buzzer.

In January 2016 the team will debut at the IIHF World Women's U18 Championships, playing in the Division I Qualification tournament in Austria. The tournament will be held Austria in Steindorf and Velden, 7–11 January 2016. Group A includes Austria, Kazakhstan, China and Romania; Group B includes Italy, Poland, Australia and Great Britain.

== Bibliography ==
- Stell, Marion K. (1991). Half the Race, A history of Australian women in sport. North Ryde, Australia: HarperCollins. ISBN 0-207-16971-3.

== See also ==
- Australia women's national ice hockey team
