= 2008–09 AWIHL season =

- League: Australian Women's Ice Hockey League
- Sport: Ice hockey
- Duration: 11 October 2008 – 1 February 2009
- Games: 12
- Teams: 4

Regular season
- Premiers: Sydney Sirens
- Top scorer: Rachel White (Sydney Sirens)

Joan McKowen Memorial Trophy
- Champions: Adelaide Assassins
- Runners-up: Sydney Sirens

AWIHL seasons
- 2007–08 2009–10

The 2008–09 AWIHL season was the second season of the Australian Women's Ice Hockey League. It ran from 11 October 2008 until 1 February 2009.

== Regular season ==
The regular season begins on 11 October 2008 and will run through to 1 February 2009

=== October ===
| Game | Date | Time | Away | Score | Home | Location | Recap |
|---|---|---|---|---|---|---|---|
| 1 | 11 October 2008 | 12:00 | Brisbane Goannas | 5 - 5 | Melbourne Dragons | Olympic Ice Skating Centre | |
| 2 | 12 October 2008 | 12:00 | Brisbane Goannas | 4 - 4 | Melbourne Dragons | Olympic Ice Skating Centre | |
| 3 | 18 October 2008 | 17:00 | Adelaide Assassins | 1 - 4 | Sydney Sirens | Penrith Ice Palace | |
| 4 | 19 October 2008 | 08:30 | Adelaide Assassins | 3 - 3 | Sydney Sirens | Canterbury Olympic Ice Rink | |

=== November ===
| Game | Date | Time | Away | Score | Home | Location | Recap |
|---|---|---|---|---|---|---|---|
| 5 | 8 November 2008 | 16:00 | Sydney Sirens | 5 - 0 | Brisbane Goannas | Brisbane | |
| 6 | 8 November 2008 | 16:30 | Melbourne Dragons | 0 - 6 | Adelaide Assassins | Ice Arena (Adelaide) | |
| 7 | 9 November 2008 | 08:30 | Sydney Sirens | 3 - 2 | Brisbane Goannas | Brisbane | |
| 8 | 9 November 2008 | 09:30 | Melbourne Dragons | 2 - 9 | Adelaide Assassins | Ice Arena (Adelaide) | |
| 9 | 22 November 2008 | 16:00 | Melbourne Dragons | 0 - 5 | Sydney Sirens | Penrith Ice Palace | |
| 10 | 22 November 2008 | 16:30 | Brisbane Goannas | 7 - 4 | Adelaide Assassins | Ice Arena (Adelaide) | |
| 11 | 23 November 2008 | 08:00 | Melbourne Dragons | 0 - 4 | Sydney Sirens | Penrith Ice Palace | |
| 12 | 23 November 2008 | 09:30 | Brisbane Goannas | 2 - 9 | Adelaide Assassins | Ice Arena (Adelaide) | |

=== December ===
| Game | Date | Time | Away | Score | Home | Location | Recap |
|---|---|---|---|---|---|---|---|
| 13 | 6 December 2008 | 16:15 | Sydney Sirens | 13 - 3 | Melbourne Dragons | Olympic Ice Skating Centre | |
| 14 | 6 December 2008 | 16:00 | Adelaide Assassins | 5 - 3 | Brisbane Goannas | Brisbane | |
| 15 | 7 December 2008 | 12:00 | Sydney Sirens | 6 - 0 | Melbourne Dragons | Olympic Ice Skating Centre | |
| 16 | 7 December 2008 | 08:30 | Adelaide Assassins | 5 - 3 | Brisbane Goannas | Brisbane | |

=== January ===
| Game | Date | Time | Away | Score | Home | Location | Recap |
|---|---|---|---|---|---|---|---|
| 17 | 17 January 2009 | 16:30 | Sydney Sirens | 1 - 2 | Adelaide Assassins | Ice Arena (Adelaide) | |
| 18 | 17 January 2009 | 16:00 | Melbourne Dragons | 0 - 4 | Brisbane Goannas | Brisbane | |
| 19 | 18 January 2009 | 09:30 | Sydney Sirens | 2 - 2 | Adelaide Assassins | Ice Arena (Adelaide) | |
| 20 | 18 January 2009 | 08:30 | Melbourne Dragons | 4 - 4 | Brisbane Goannas | Brisbane | |
| 21 | 31 January 2009 | 16:00 | Brisbane Goannas | 2 - 5 | Sydney Sirens | Penrith Ice Palace | |
| 22 | 31 January 2009 | 16:15 | Adelaide Assassins | 9 - 3 | Melbourne Dragons | Olympic Ice Skating Centre | |

=== February ===
| Game | Date | Time | Away | Score | Home | Location | Recap |
|---|---|---|---|---|---|---|---|
| 23 | 1 February 2009 | 08:00 | Brisbane Goannas | 0 - 3 | Sydney Sirens | Penrith Ice Palace | |
| 24 | 1 February 2009 | 12:00 | Adelaide Assassins | 6 - 1 | Melbourne Dragons | Olympic Ice Skating Centre | |

== Standings ==
Note: GP = Games played; W = Wins; L = Losses; T = Ties; GF = Goals for; GA = Goals against; GDF = Goal differential; PTS = Points

Win = 2 pts
Tie = 1 pt
Loss = 0 pts

The regular season league standings are as follows:

| Team | GP | W | L | T | GF | GA | GDF | PTS |
|---|---|---|---|---|---|---|---|---|
| Sydney Sirens | 12 | 9 | 1 | 2 | 35 | 12 | +23 | 20 |
| Adelaide Assassins | 12 | 8 | 2 | 2 | 51 | 25 | +26 | 18 |
| Brisbane Goannas | 12 | 2 | 7 | 3 | 30 | 42 | -12 | 7 |
| Melbourne Dragons | 12 | 0 | 9 | 3 | 19 | 56 | -37 | 3 |

== Scoring leaders ==
Note: GP = Games played; G = Goals; A = Assists; Pts = Points; PIM = Penalty minutes

| Player | Team | GP | G | A | Pts | PIM |
|---|---|---|---|---|---|---|
| Rachel White | Sydney Sirens | 12 | 14 | 7 | 21 | 12 |
| Natasha Farrier | Adelaide Assassins | 7 | 13 | 5 | 18 | 16 |
| K Miyachi | Adelaide Assassins | 7 | 7 | 11 | 18 | 6 |
| Kath McOnie | Sydney Sirens | 12 | 8 | 10 | 18 | 2 |
| Andrea Steranko | Brisbane Goannas | 6 | 8 | 7 | 15 | 16 |
| Lisa McMahon | Brisbane Goannas | 11 | 8 | 7 | 15 | 0 |
| Kaylee White | Sydney Sirens | 12 | 6 | 5 | 11 | 12 |
| Amelia Matheson | Sydney Sirens | 12 | 5 | 6 | 11 | 4 |
| Heidi Coe | Sydney Sirens | 8 | 7 | 3 | 10 | 4 |
| Sharna Godfrey | Brisbane Goannas | 9 | 7 | 2 | 9 | 16 |

== Leading goaltenders ==
Note: GP = Games played; Mins = Minutes played; W = Wins; L = Losses: T = Ties; GA = Goals Allowed; SO = Shutouts; GAA = Goals against average

| Player | Team | GP | Mins | W | L | T | GA | SO | Sv% | GAA |
|---|---|---|---|---|---|---|---|---|---|---|
| Alex Stefan | Sydney Sirens | 7 | 330 | 5 | 0 | 2 | 7 | 3 | 0.950 | 1.08 |
| Ashleigh Brown | Sydney Sirens | 7 | 330 | 4 | 1 | 0 | 8 | 2 | 0.927 | 1.24 |
| Belinda James | Adelaide Assassins | 6 | 330 | 3 | 1 | 2 | 15 | 0 | 0.915 | 2.32 |
| Jodie Walker | Melbourne Dragons | 4 | 165 | 0 | 1 | 3 | 11 | 0 | 0.889 | 3.40 |
| Sheryn Gillin | Brisbane Goannas | 11 | 542 | 1 | 6 | 3 | 37 | 0 | 0.842 | 3.48 |

== Playoffs ==
The finals series was hosted in Newcastle, New South Wales at Hunter Ice Skating Stadium over the weekend of 14–15 February 2015.

=== Semi Final Game 1 ===
| 14 February 2009 | Sydney Sirens | 5 - 1; 3 | Melbourne Dragons | Hunter Ice Skating Stadium |

5 / Goals / 1

=== Semi Final Game 2 ===
| 14 February 2009 | Adelaide Assassins | 4 - 3; 3 | Brisbane Goannas | Hunter Ice Skating Stadium |

| Claudia Tom | Goalies | Kristy Bruske, Sheryn Gillin |
4 / Goals / 3
| 23 | Shots | 28 |

=== Consolation final ===
| 15 February 2009; 14:15 | Brisbane Goannas | 3 - 0; 3 | Melbourne Dragons | Hunter Ice Skating Stadium |

Game reference
| Goalies | Jodie Walker |
3 / Goals / 0

=== Grand Final ===
| 15 February 2009 | Sydney Sirens | 2 - 3; 3 | Adelaide Assassins | Hunter Ice Skating Stadium |

| Ashleigh Brown | Goalies | Belinda James |
2 / Goals / 3

== See also ==
- Brisbane Goannas vs Melbourne Dragons Consolation final - Game Images Pics by Wulos
- Sydney Sirens vs Adelaide Assassins Grand Final - Game Images Pics by Wulos
- Ice Hockey Australia
- Joan McKowen Memorial Trophy
