= 2009–10 AWIHL season =

- League: Australian Women's Ice Hockey League
- Sport: Ice hockey
- Duration: 17 October 2009 – 14 February 2010
- Games: 12
- Teams: 4

Regular season
- Premiers: Adelaide Assassins

Joan McKowen Memorial Trophy
- Champions: Adelaide Assassins
- Runners-up: Sydney Sirens

AWIHL seasons
- 2008–09 2010–11

The 2009–10 AWIHL season is the third season of the Australian Women's Ice Hockey League. It ran from 17 October 2009 until 14 February 2010.

== Regular season ==
The regular season begins on 17 October 2009 and will run through to 14 February 2010

=== October ===
Game	Date	Time	Away	Score	Home	Location	Recap
1	17 October 2009	16:50	Brisbane Goannas	5 - 3	Sydney Sirens	Canterbury Olympic Ice Rink	
2	17 October 2009	16:45	Melbourne Dragons	3 - 8	Adelaide Assassins	Ice Arena (Adelaide)	
3	18 October 2009	10:00	Melbourne Dragons	2 - 10	Adelaide Assassins	Ice Arena (Adelaide)	
4	18 October 2009	10:00	Brisbane Goannas	4 - 5	Sydney Sirens	Penrith Ice Palace	

=== November ===
Game	Date	Time	Away	Score	Home	Location	Recap
5	7 November 2009	15:00	Sydney Sirens	3 - 4	Melbourne Dragons	Olympic Ice Skating Centre	
6	7 November 2009	08:15	Adelaide Assassins	5 - 0	Brisbane Goannas	Brisbane	
7	8 November 2009	12:00	Sydney Sirens	1 - 5	Melbourne Dragons	Olympic Ice Skating Centre	
8	8 November 2009	09:00	Adelaide Assassins	4 - 3	Brisbane Goannas	Acacia Ridge	
9	28 November 2009	17:00	Adelaide Assassins	4 - 4	Sydney Sirens	Penrith Ice Palace	
10	28 November 2009	15:00	Brisbane Goannas	3 - 1	Melbourne Dragons	Olympic Ice Skating Centre	
11	29 November 2009	08:45	Adelaide Assassins	1 - 2	Sydney Sirens	Canterbury Olympic Ice Rink	
12	29 November 2009	11:30	Brisbane Goannas	1 - 4	Melbourne Dragons	Olympic Ice Skating Centre	

=== December ===
Game	Date	Time	Away	Score	Home	Location	Recap
13	12 December 2009	16:30	Sydney Sirens	2 - 4	Adelaide Assassins	Ice Arena (Adelaide)	
14	12 December 2009	17:45	Brisbane Goannas	4 - 0	Melbourne Dragons	Brisbane	
15	13 December 2009	08:30	Sydney Sirens	2 - 10	Adelaide Assassins	Ice Arena (Adelaide)	
16	13 December 2009	09:00	Brisbane Goannas	3 - 3	Melbourne Dragons	Acacia Ridge	

== Standings ==
Note: GP = Games played; W = Wins; L = Losses; T = Ties; GF = Goals for; GA = Goals against; GDF = Goal differential; PTS = Points

Win = 2 pts
Tie = 1 pt
Loss = 0 pts

The regular season league standings are as follows:

Team	GP	W	L	T	GF	GA	GDF	PTS
Adelaide Assassins	12	9	2	1	83	31	+52	19
Sydney Sirens	12	5	5	2	39	46	-7	12
Melbourne Dragons	12	4	6	2	34	53	-19	10
Brisbane Goannas	12	3	8	1	33	59	-26	7

== See also ==
- Ice Hockey Australia
- Joan McKowen Memorial Trophy
