= Sydney Sirens =

Ice hockey team in Sydney, New South Wales

- City: Sydney
- League: Australian Women's Ice Hockey League
- Founded: 2005
- Home arena: Macquarie Ice Rink
- Colours: (2005–2010) (2010–2011) (2011–present)
- General manager: Neil McFadden
- Head coach: Gabe Robledo
- Captain: Sarah Edney

Franchise history
- 2005–2010: Sydney Sirens
- 2010–2011: North Star Sirens
- 2011–present: Sydney Sirens

Championships
- Regular season titles: 3 (2009), (2017), (2020)
- AWIHL championships: 3 (2017), (2020) (2023)

The Sydney Sirens are an ice hockey team based in Sydney, New South Wales, Australia. The Sirens compete in the Australian Women's Ice Hockey League (AWIHL). The AWIHL is the top tier national league in the country for women and they were one of the founding members. The Sirens have been affiliated with several different hockey rinks in the state throughout their existence and have won 3 titles since the league's inception.

== History ==
Formed in 2007, they were one of the four founding teams in the AWIHL. The Sirens would change their name from 2011 to 2013 to the North Star Sirens but reverted to their original name Sydney Sirens, which they presently use. In 2015 the team announced that they would be moving from their former home rink Sydney Ice Arena to the Canterbury Olympic Ice Rink and were hoping to expand their fan base in the inner western suburbs of Sydney.

Sydney Sirens have expanded their reach in NSW with players from Newcastle, Central Coast travelling for approximately 2 hours to get to the rink. This team is also unique because they are one of the only teams which are allowed to take in players from neighbouring territory, ACT. These players drive over 3 hours to get to practice and games.

Early years (2005–2016)

In 2005, discussion began around establishing a national league for women. 2006 would see Sydney enter a team in to a mini-series competing against 3 other teams from different states. Sydney would formally enter the AWIHL as the Sydney Sirens and become one of the four founding members in 2007.

Results
Year	Semifinal	Final	Champions	Premier
2008			Adelaide Adrenaline	
2009	Win	Loss	Adelaide Adrenaline	Premiers
2010	Win	Loss	Adelaide Adrenaline	Runner-Up
2011	Win	Loss	Melbourne Ice	Premiers
2012		–	Adelaide Adrenaline	–
2013		–	Melbourne Ice	–
2014		–	Melbourne Ice	–
2015	Win	Loss	Melbourne Ice	Runner-Up
2016	Win	Loss	Melbourne Ice	Premier

2016–2017 Championship

The Sirens finished short and felt like they had a score to settle losing in the previous year's Grand Final in 2016.

In the 2017 AWIHL season, the League would announce that import goalies were no longer allowed. 4 imports were also now allowed on the team but only 2 were able to be played per game.

Sharna Godfrey was coming off a great season prior as Scoring Leader, closely followed by Kath McOnie. The Sirens would end up minor premiers and dominate their first semi-final 10–0 to face the Brisbane Goannas in a tightly contested Grand Final. Notable imports were CIS Raven graduate Erin Beaver and Ontario native Steph Cochrane who would later go on to represent the National Women's team (NWT) the following year.

Netminder Sera Dogramaci was clutch in the 4–3 OT Shootout win at Sydney's home rink for the Sirens to win their first National Championship.

2019–2020 Championship

The 2020 Australian Women’s Ice Hockey League (AWIHL) Finals featured a match between the Sydney Sirens and the Adelaide Rush, with the Sirens winning the national championship. The Sirens, coached by Jayden Ryan, included several national team players as well as international players, including sisters Sarah Edney and Dini Edney, along with Kayla Nielsen. The final featured goaltenders Tina Girdler for the Sirens and Michelle Coonan for the Rush. The Sirens won the match without conceding a goal and scored three goals to secure the championship title.

2020–2022 Championship

Unfortunately, the following two years saw the cancellation of the AWIHL forced due to the COVID-19 pandemic. However, the league made a triumphant return at the end of 2022, along with the Brisbane Goannas undergoing a rebranding to become the Brisbane Lightning and aligning themselves with their local AIHL team.

2022–2023 Season

For the 2022–2023 season, the Sirens relocated to the Macquarie Ice Rink, and the management team remaining mostly intact, Jayden Ryan would return to serve as Head Coach with Gabe Robledo joining team staff as Assistant Coach.

Heading into the 2023 season, the Sirens welcomed 15 rookies to their team/squad list, including 8 current and former alumni of the National Women's U18 Team, 2 NCAA collegiate athletes, 1 Canadian collegiate athlete, and 1 Swedish Women's Professional athlete who also competed for Team Sweden in Ringette.

2022–2023 Championship

Georgia Clarke would score the first goal to swing momentum for the Sirens'. Her first goal in her rookie season. Sarah Edney would make Brisbane pay breaking through and scoring some goals from tight angles. Sharna Godfrey finishing a tick tack toe pass on the powerplay.

The Sirens would face off against the Melbourne Ice for a grudge match. The Siren's speed and chemistry would prove too much for a usually well disciplined and dangerous Melbourne squad. Former NWU18T Captain Ebony Brunt would score top shelf to force a change of goalie. The match ended 5–2, with the Sirens becoming back to back National Champions

== Logo and Uniform ==
The uniform is coloured black, with red stars and a logo that adds yellow. The logo depicts a Siren, characters of Greek mythology.

The Away uniform is coloured white, with red stars, yellow and red stripes. 2023 included a minor update to the Away set to include pink fill in to the siren logo to make it more prominent on the jersey.

== Players ==
=== Current roster ===
For the 2016–17 AWIHL season

#	Nat	Name	Pos	Date of birth	Acquired	Birthplace
16		Amelia Matheson	F	30 July 1986	2010	Newcastle, New South Wales
6		Chloe Walker	D	8 January 2002	2015	Glenfield, New South Wales
17		Sharna Godfrey	F	17 February 1988	2010	Tweed Heads, New South Wales
27		Ava Calabria	F	10 April 2002	2015	Sydney
25		Erin Beaver	D	22 October 1991	2016	Oakville, Ontario
53		Hollie McFadden	F	13 October 1997	2009	Sydney
19		Katherine McOnie	F	30 August 1984	2012	Feilding, New Zealand
91		Shiarna Tarasenko	F	9 March 2001	2015	Sydney
8		Remi Harvey	F	14 November 1994	2010	Sydney
12		Sharnita Crompton	F	19 May 1994	2012	Erina, New South Wales
15		Stephenie Cochrane	F	3 November 1990	2013	Morrisburg, Ontario
36		Krista Murphy (Korhonen)	F	29 March 1988	2014	London, Ontario
38		Ella Licari	G	15 September 1977	2016	Perth, Australia

=== Captains ===
- 2011–12 Kaylee White (C), Amelia Matheson (A), Anna Ruut (A)
- 2012–13 Kaylee White (C), Amelia Matheson (A), Sharna Godfrey (A)
- 2013–14 Kaylee White (C), Amelia Matheson (A), Sharna Godfrey (A)
- 2014–15 Kaylee White (C), Stephenie Cochrane (A), Amelia Matheson (A)
- 2015–16 Amelia Matheson (C), Stephenie Cochrane (A), Krista Murphy (A)
- 2016–17 Amelia Matheson (C), Stephenie Cochrane (A), Krista Murphy (A)
- 2019–20 Stephenie Cochrane (C), Sarah Edney (A), Kath McOnie (A)
- 2022–23 Sarah Edney (C), Kath McOnie (A), Remi Harvey (A)
- 2023 – 24 Sarah Edney (C), Fiona Moon (A), Ebony Brunt (A)
- 2024 – 25 Sarah Edney (C), Julia Pochini (A), Kath McOnie (A)

== Coaches ==
- 2010–11 Pier Martin (Head), Andrew Reynolds (Asst.), John Harvey (Asst.)
- 2015–16 Troy Morgan Coach, Jeff Helbren Coach
- 2016–17 Troy Morgan Coach, Jeff Helbren Coach
- 2017–18 Jeff Helbren Coach, Troy Morgan Coach
- 2018–19 Jeff Helbren Coach, James Hammond Coach
- 2019–20 Jayden Ryan (Head), Kaylee Reitsma (Asst.), Don MacDonald (Asst.)
- 2022–23 Jayden Ryan (Head), Gabe Robledo (Asst.)

== See also ==
- Ice Hockey Australia
- Joan McKowen Memorial Trophy
- Australian Ice Hockey League
- Australian Junior Ice Hockey League
- Jim Brown Trophy
- Goodall Cup
- Women's ice hockey in Australia
