= 2015 Brown Tournament =

2015 Jim Brown Tournament
- League: Ice Hockey Australia
- Sport: Ice hockey
- Duration: 8 October 2015 – 11 October 2015
- Games: 15
- Teams: 6

Tournament
- First place finish: Victoria

Jim Brown Shield
- Champions: Victoria
- Runners-up: Western Australia

Australian Men's National Ice Hockey Championship seasons
- 2014 2016

The Jim Brown Shield Tournament is an annually awarded interstate ice hockey championship trophy in Australia for senior men aged 17 years and older with the condition that players of the Australian Ice Hockey League that are 24 years and older must have played less than 6 games to remain eligible. The current trophy is in the form of a shield and is the third trophy to bear the Brown family name. The trophy is named after Scottish born James Archibald Brown. The Jim Brown Shield is competed for in a series of games between state representative teams in what is called The Brown Tournament.

== Jim Brown Memorial Trophy Tournament ==
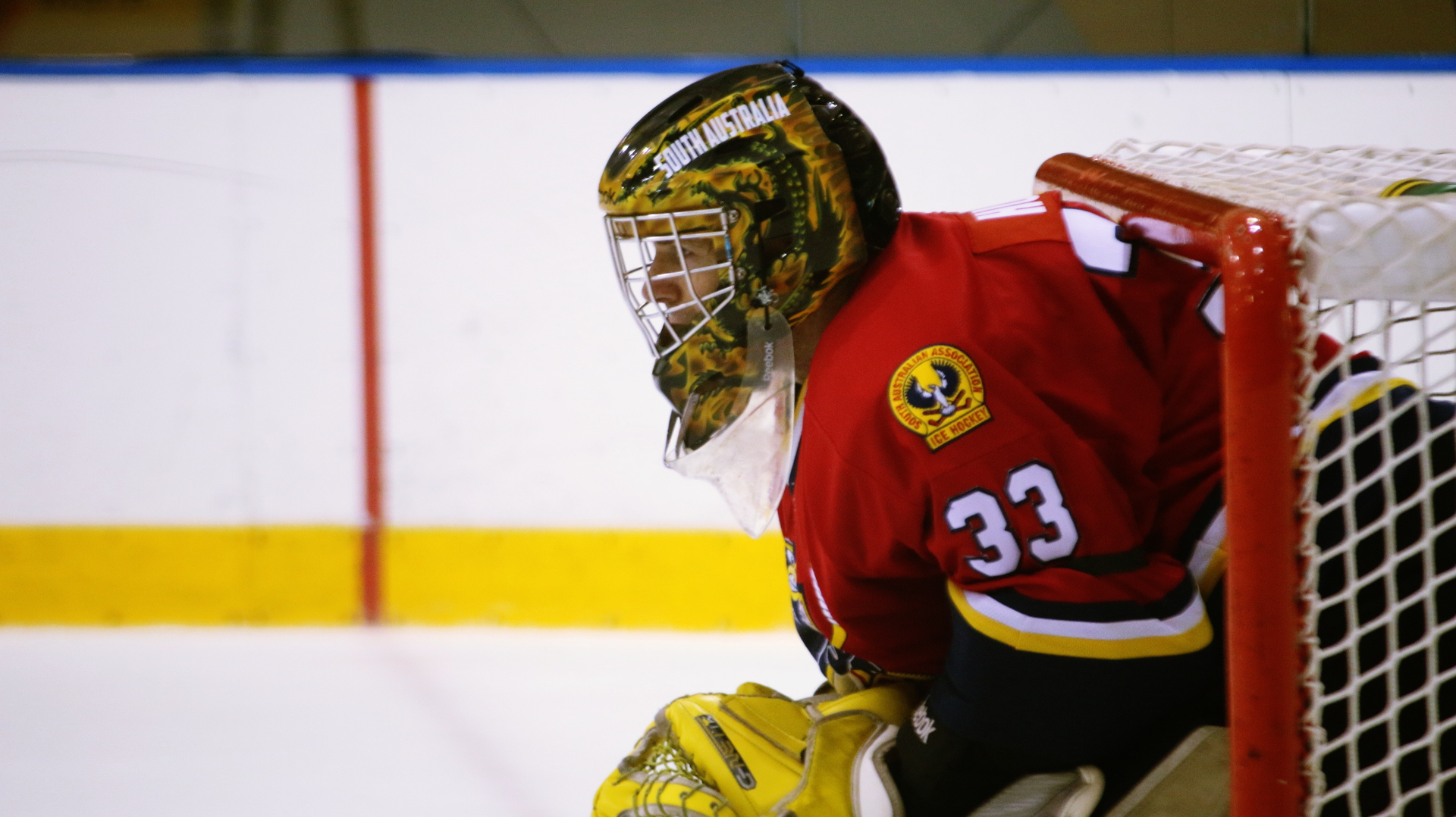
2015 Brown Tournament - South Australian goaltender Ian Hunter

The 2015 national tournament will be held from 8 October - 11 October and will consist of 6 teams, 5 representing a state each and 1 representing a territory. The Australian territory that is competing in the tournament is Australian Capital Territory. The states competing are Victoria, New South Wales, Queensland, South Australia and the 2014 champions Western Australia.

The tournament will be held at the O'Brien Group Arena, in Docklands, Victoria.

The schedule is as follows:

2015 Jim Brown Tournament Schedule
Game	Date	Time	Away	Score	Home	Location	Recap
1	8 October 2015	16:00	South Australia	1 - 10	Victoria	O'Brien Group Arena	
2	8 October 2015	18:45	New South Wales	2 - 4	Queensland	O'Brien Group Arena	
3	8 October 2015	20:45	Australian Capital Territory	0 - 6	Western Australia	O'Brien Group Arena	
4	9 October 2015	7:00	New South Wales	2 - 6	Victoria	O'Brien Group Arena	
5	9 October 2015	9:00	South Australia	5 - 1	Australian Capital Territory	O'Brien Group Arena	
6	9 October 2015	11:00	Western Australia	4 - 2	Queensland	O'Brien Group Arena	
7	9 October 2015	14:00	New South Wales	1 - 4	South Australia	O'Brien Group Arena	
8	9 October 2015	16:30	Western Australia	2 - 4	Victoria	O'Brien Group Arena	
9	9 October 2015	18:15	Australian Capital Territory	1 - 5	Queensland	O'Brien Group Arena	
10	10 October 2015	7:00	New South Wales	6 - 1	Australian Capital Territory	O'Brien Group Arena	
11	10 October 2015	9:00	South Australia	2 - 6	Western Australia	O'Brien Group Arena	
12	10 October 2015	11:00	Queensland	1 - 2	Victoria	O'Brien Group Arena	
13	10 October 2015	14:00	Western Australia	7 - 0	New South Wales	O'Brien Group Arena	
14	10 October 2015	16:00	South Australia	1 - 2	Queensland	O'Brien Group Arena	
15	10 October 2015	18:00	Victoria	12 - 0	Australian Capital Territory	O'Brien Group Arena	

== Standings ==
The standings for the 2015 Jim Brown Memorial Tournament:

Team	GP	W	OTW	OTL	L	GF	GA	GDF	PTS
Victoria	5	5	0	0	0	34	6	+28	15
Western Australia	5	4	0	0	1	25	8	+17	12
Queensland	5	3	0	0	2	14	12	+2	9
South Australia	5	2	0	0	3	13	20	-7	6
New South Wales	5	1	0	0	4	11	21	-10	3
Australian Capital Territory	5	0	0	0	5	3	32	–29	0

== Jim Brown Shield Championship ==
=== Semi Final 1 ===
11 October 2015; 08:00	Victoria	8 – 0 (2-0, 6-0, 8-0)	South Australia	O'Brien Group Arena

8 / Goals / 0

=== Semi Final 2 ===
11 October 2015; 10:00	Western Australia	4 – 3 (1-0, 1-3, 4-3)	Queensland	O'Brien Group Arena

4 / Goals / 3

=== Bronze-medal game ===
11 October 2015; 15:00	South Australia	1 – 3 (0-1, 1-2, 1-3)	Queensland	O'Brien Group Arena

1 / Goals / 3

=== Gold-medal game ===
11 October 2015; 17:00	Victoria	6 – 0 (1-0, 4-0, 6-0)	Western Australia	O'Brien Group Arena; Attendance: 200

Michael James	Goalies
6 / Goals / 0

== See also ==
- Jim Brown Memorial Trophy
- Ice Hockey Australia
- Australian Capital Territory Ice Hockey Association
- New South Wales Ice Hockey Association
- Ice Hockey Queensland
- South Australia Ice Hockey Association
- Victorian Ice Hockey Association
- Western Australian Ice Hockey Association
- Australian Ice Hockey League
- Goodall Cup
- Joan McKowen Memorial Trophy
