= 2014 Brown Tournament =

2014 Jim Brown Tournament
- League: Ice Hockey Australia
- Sport: Ice hockey
- Duration: 2 October 2015 – 5 October 2015
- Games: 12
- Teams: 4

Tournament

Jim Brown Memorial Trophy
- Champions: Western Australia
- Runners-up: Barbarians

IHA seasons
- ← 2013 2015 →

The Jim Brown Memorial Trophy Tournament is an annually awarded interstate ice hockey championship trophy in Australia. In 2014 it was for senior men aged 17 years and older with the condition that players of the Australian Ice Hockey League that are 20 years and younger must have played less than 6 games to remain eligible. The current trophy is in the form of a shield and is the third trophy to bear the Brown family name. The trophy is named after Scottish born James Archibald Brown. The Brown Trophy is competed for in a series of games between state representative teams in what is called The Brown Tournament.

== Jim Brown Memorial Trophy Tournament ==
The 2014 national tournament was held from 2 October - 5 October and consisted of 4 teams, 3 teams represented a state while a 4th team were a combination of Western Australian and Queensland players called Barbarians. The Barbarians team was formed after Victoria pulled out of the tournament.

The tournament was held at Xtreme Ice Arena in Mirrabooka, Western Australia.

The schedule is as follows:

2014 Jim Brown Tournament Schedule
Game	Date	Time	Away	Score	Home	Location	Recap
1	2 October 2015	18:15	South Australia	0 - 6	Western Australia	Xtreme Ice Arena	
2	2 October 2015	20:00	New South Wales	2 - 4	Barbarians	Xtreme Ice Arena	
3	3 October 2015	08:30	Western Australia	8 - 0	New South Wales	Xtreme Ice Arena	
4	3 October 2015	10:15	Barbarians	4 - 2	South Australia	Xtreme Ice Arena	
5	3 October 2015	16:00	South Australia	2 - 5	New South Wales	Xtreme Ice Arena	
6	3 October 2015	17:45	Western Australia	2 - 4	Barbarians	Xtreme Ice Arena	
7	4 October 2015	6:45	Barbarians	3 - 4	New South Wales	Xtreme Ice Arena	
8	4 October 2015	8:30	Western Australia	4 - 0	South Australia	Xtreme Ice Arena	
9	4 October 2015	16:45	New South Wales	2 - 3	Western Australia	Xtreme Ice Arena	
10	4 October 2015	18:30	South Australia	1 - 4	Barbarians	Xtreme Ice Arena	
11	5 October 2015	06:45	New South Wales	3 - 1	South Australia	Xtreme Ice Arena	
12	5 October 2015	08:30	Barbarians	0 - 6	Western Australia	Xtreme Ice Arena	

== Standings ==
The standings for the 2014 Jim Brown Memorial Tournament:

Team	GP	W	OTW	OTL	L	GF	GA	GDF	PTS
Western Australia	6	5	0	0	1	29	6	+23	15
Barbarians	6	4	0	0	2	19	17	+2	12
New South Wales	6	2	0	0	4	16	21	-5	6
South Australia	6	1	0	0	5	6	26	-20	3

== Jim Brown Memorial Trophy Championship ==
=== Bronze Medal Game ===
5 October 2015; 17:00	New South Wales	2 – 1 (SO) (0–0, 1–1, 1–1)	South Australia	Xtreme Ice Arena; Attendance: 150

Game reference
Alan Becken	Goalies	Sam O'Neill	Referee: Cory Ross; Linesmen: Joe Mayer; Tony Paolo
2 / Goals / 1			Referee: Cory Ross; Linesmen: Joe Mayer; Tony Paolo
23	Shots	32	Referee: Cory Ross; Linesmen: Joe Mayer; Tony Paolo

=== Gold Medal Game ===
5 October 2015; 18:45	Western Australia	4 – 3 (1–1, 3–2, 4–3)	Barbarians	Xtreme Ice Arena; Attendance: 230

Game reference
Mark McCann	Goalies	Daniel Wilkinson	Referee: Matt Taylor; Linesmen: Daryl Hamilton; Mathew Gregory
4 / Goals / 3			Referee: Matt Taylor; Linesmen: Daryl Hamilton; Mathew Gregory
23	Shots	17	Referee: Matt Taylor; Linesmen: Daryl Hamilton; Mathew Gregory

== See also ==
- Jim Brown Memorial Trophy
- Ice Hockey Australia
- New South Wales Ice Hockey Association
- South Australia Ice Hockey Association
- Western Australian Ice Hockey Association
- Australian Ice Hockey League
- Goodall Cup
- Joan McKowen Memorial Trophy
