= IceHQ =

- Interactive map of IceHQ
- Former names: Puckhandlers (1998-2018)
- Address: 1 Blake St, Reservoir VIC 3073; Melbourne; Australia
- Coordinates: 37.732377°S 145.037801°E
- Capacity: 500
- Surface: 61 by 26 metres

Construction
- Opened: 1 July 2018

Tenant
- Melbourne Ducks (AWIHL) 2025-present Ice Hockey Victoria

Website
- www.icehq.com.au

IceHQ is an Australian ice hockey rink & entertainment centre, located in Reservoir, a suburb of Melbourne, in Victoria, Australia.

== History ==
The first iteration of the rink opened in 1998 as Puckhandlers, an inline roller hockey rink originally operating out of a leased basketball stadium from the City of Darebin.

The process to convert the rink into a purpose built ice hockey rink, was completed in 2018, and IceHQ officially re-opened on 1 July 2018.

== Events ==
Since opening in July 2018, IceHQ has played host to many professional and semi-professional events, alongside recreational ice hockey leagues. Melbourne Ducks, IceHQ's main tenant, has played host to various games with their senior teams in various competitions. The Ducks' former mens senior team once played in the Pacific Hockey League, a short-lived semi-professional hockey league in Australia, playing for a solitary season in 2022.

In 2025, the Melbourne Ducks were accepted as the Australian Women's Ice Hockey League's sixth team after playing exhibition matches in 2023 and 2024, with IceHQ being their home rink for regular season matches.

Ice Hockey Victoria state-level competitions also take place in IceHQ alongside the Olympic Ice Skating Rink in Oakleigh, as well as the Icehouse located in Docklands.

== Location ==
IceHQ is located on 1 Blake St, Reservoir. It is located near Northland Shopping Centre, a major regional shopping precinct in Melbourne's northern suburbs.

The closest public transport to the Icehouse is the Melbourne bus network, operated by Transport Victoria. The bus route 567 runs closest to the venue, with a stop located on Seston St, with Northland Shopping Centre serving as a major bus interchange within walking distance.

== See also ==
- List of ice rinks in Australia
- Sport in Victoria
