= Australia Women's Championships (baseball) =

The Australian Women's Championships is an annual event run by the Australian Baseball Federation. The Championship includes the women's Queensland Rams, Western Australia Heat, Victoria Aces, New South Wales Patriots as well as Victorian Provincial, a New South Wales Country team, South Australia and Australian Capital Territory.

The tournament for the first 10 years was dominated by Victoria, winning nine and only rivalled by New South Wales, who have won two tournaments. This is mainly due to the strong women's baseball competition in Victoria, which includes 33 teams over three divisions, perhaps the largest local women's baseball competition in the world.

In 2010, the Western Australia Heat went through the tournament undefeated, defeating New South Wales in the final 7–6. This was the first final without Victoria competing in it and the first time Western Australia won the tournament.

== Championships and Winning Teams ==
- 2026 Melbourne, Victoria - Victoria
- 2025 Melbourne Victoria - New South Wales
- 2024 Melbourne Victoria - Victoria
- 2023 Melbourne, Victoria – Western Australia
- 2022 Adelaide, South Australia – New South Wales
- 2021 Adelaide, South Australia – Cancelled due to COVID-19
- 2020 Canberra, Australian Capital Territory – Cancelled due to COVID-19
- 2019 Canberra, Australian Capital Territory – Victoria
- 2018 Geelong, Victoria – New South Wales
- 2017 Canberra, Australian Capital Territory – Victoria
- 2016 Canberra, Australian Capital Territory – New South Wales
- 2015 Canberra, Australian Capital Territory – New South Wales
- 2014 Sydney, New South Wales – New South Wales
- 2013 Ballarat, Victoria – Victoria
- 2012 Canberra, Australian Capital Territory – Western Australia
- 2011 Canberra, Australian Capital Territory – Victoria
- 2010 Gold Coast, Queensland – Western Australia
- 2009 Geelong, Victoria – Victoria
- 2008 Wollongong, New South Wales – Victoria
- 2007 Perth, Western Australia – Victoria
- 2006 Ipswich, Queensland – New South Wales
- 2005 Melbourne, Victoria – Victoria
- 2004 Tamworth, New South Wales – Victoria
- 2003 Perth, Western Australia – New South Wales
- 2002 Gold Coast, Queensland – Victoria
- 2001 Sydney, New South Wales – Victoria
- 2000 Melbourne, Victoria – Victoria
- 1999 Melbourne, Victoria – Victoria

== See also ==
- Women's baseball in Australia
- Baseball awards § Australia
