= Joan McKowen =

Personal information
- Full name: Joan Moreen McKowen
- Nationality: Australian
- Died: 15 September 1992 Australian Capital Territory
- Spouse: Maxwell John McKowen

Sport
- Country: Australia
- Sport: Ice hockey

Joan Moreen McKowen (born Joan Moreen Scott, died 15 September 1992) was an Australian ice hockey figure, particularly known for her specialisation in post-game rehabilitation. She is commemorated by the Joan McKowen Memorial Trophy, currently awarded in the Australian Women's Ice Hockey League. She was a qualified remedial masseuse, complementing her husband Max who specialised in sports medicine, and toured the world with Australian National ice hockey teams.

== Personal life ==
Joan McKowen was born Joan Moreen Scott.

She was married to Maxwell John McKowen. On 5 July 1948 their engagement was announced.

== Ice hockey ==
Joan McKowen began her involvement in Australian ice hockey by tending to her son's own injuries and eventually volunteering to tend to the entire team's injuries. In 1982 she became a qualified remedial masseuse and then took part in post-game rehabilitation, complementing her husband Max who specialised in sports medicine, and toured the world with Australian National ice hockey teams. McKowen was the assistant for the 1986 Australian Youth Ice Hockey team that competed in the Oceania championships held in Adelaide, South Australia.

=== Joan McKowen Memorial Trophy ===
After McKowen died on 15 September 1992, the Joan McKowen Memorial Trophy was created in her memory and used as the award for the national senior women's ice hockey tournament until 2009. In 2010 the trophy presented to the winners of the champions of the finals of the Australian Women's Ice Hockey League, a national league for the most elite level of senior women's ice hockey players in Australia.

=== Joan McKowen IHA National Teams Honour Board ===
McKowen's family have maintained an Honour Board in her honour which contains every Ice Hockey Australia national team player and official who represented Australia at a world championship, dating back to the 1960 Squaw Valley Olympics. The sole intention of the board is to remind the athletes of all disciplines of the proud history of the sport of ice hockey in Australia.
