= National Hockey Super League =

Australian Ice-hockey league

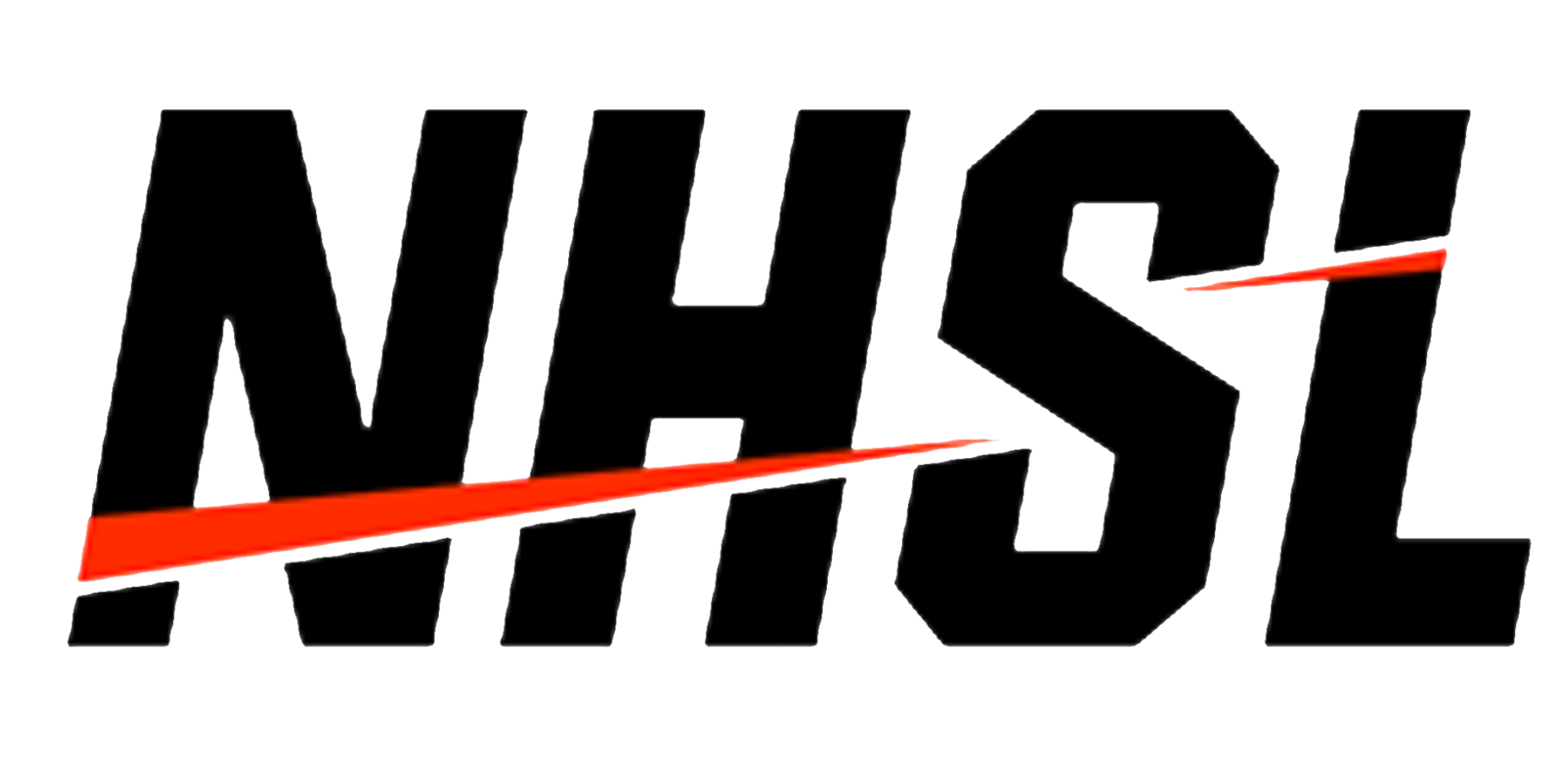
- Sport: Ice Hockey
- Founded: 2021 (5 years ago)
- First season: 2021
- No. of teams: 3
- Country: Australia
- Headquarters: Adelaide, South Australia, Australia
- Broadcasters: SBS (match of the round & highlights)
- Website: nhsl.com.au

The National Hockey Super League (NHSL) is a defunct professional ice hockey league based in Australia. Started in November 2021, it was the first professional ice hockey league in Australia.

The league was formally announced on the 16th of September, with three founding teams to start the league. All three teams were based in Adelaide, and all games were played in the IceArenA. The 2022-2023 season did not go ahead nor has there been any official announcements about the league since 2022.

== Teams ==
Teams formerly in the NHSL.

Team	City	State	Arena	Capacity	Founded	Joined	Former names
National Hockey Super League
Adelaide Xtream	Adelaide	(South Australia)	IceArenA	1,500	2021		
Noarlunga Stars	Adelaide	(South Australia)	IceArenA	1,500	2021		
Port Adelaide Brewers	Adelaide	(South Australia)	IceArenA	1,500	2021		

== Expansion ==
In its first year, NHSL features three teams made up of predominantly South Australian-based players. The league had plans to expand to a national format in 2022, with the goal to have 15 teams nationwide by 2023. The planned 2022-2023 season did not go ahead, nor has there been any posts on the official Instagram page since August 19, 2022. The official website is defunct, leading to speculation that the league has folded.

Team	City	State	Arena	Capacity	Founded	Joined	Former names
Possible Expansion
Cockburn Chiefs	Cockburn	(Western Australia)	Cockburn IceArena	1,500	2022		
Fremantle Fury	Fremantle	(Western Australia)	Cockburn IceArena	1,500	2022		
Perth Patriots	Perth	(Western Australia)	Perth Ice Arena	1,500	2022		
