= Women's baseball in Australia =

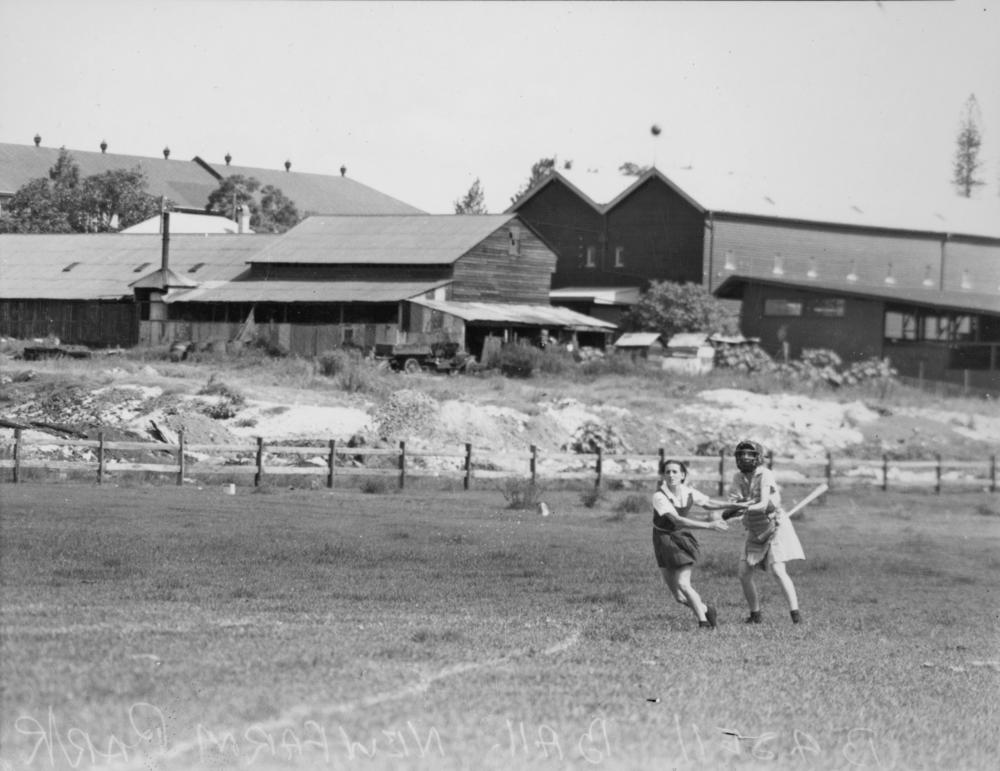
- Two girls participating in a game of baseball, Brisbane, 1938
- Country: Australia
- National team: Australia

In the 1880s in Victoria, there were school competitions for girls involving interschool competitions for rounders, an early form of baseball. The competitions were abandoned in the 1890s. Girls who played rounders/baseball during the 1880s and 1890s were required to wear long sleeved shirts and long skirts. These restricted a player's ability to move.

At Merton Hall in 1908, school girls who did not want to play other sports were required to play baseball. Merton Hall's girls baseball team competed against Lauriston and PLC. During the 1900s, baseball was a year-round sport. Because of clothing restrictions, during the 1900s, "two masters, captaining opposing teams of boarders and day girls, did all the running."

During the 1910s, vigoro was played in some schools in Australia. The game was a combination of baseball and cricket. It was popular in New South Wales, Tasmania and Queensland.

During the 1910s, girls' sports in schools were hard to organise because of a lack of available equipment and space set aside for them. There were also issues of the lack of available players at schools. This made it hard to play baseball at school.

In 1911, there was a state organisation for women's baseball in Western Australia.

In the late 1920s, the YWCA started several baseball teams in Canberra.

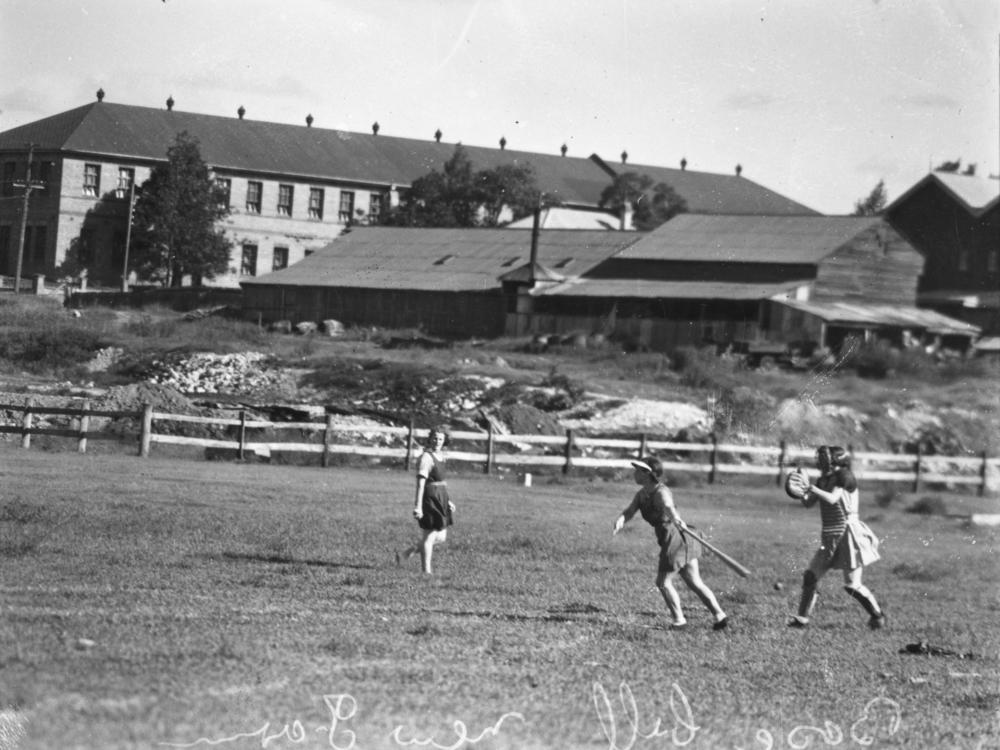
Female baseball players in the field, Brisbane, 1938

During the 1930s, companies sponsored women's sport teams, and occasionally women's baseball teams, because physical activity for women improved their productivity at work. Arnotts in New South Wales purpose built several facilities for its female employees, including a baseball diamond.

During the 1930s, country competitions were frequently held for female sports players. One of the sports that country competition regularly took place for was baseball.

In the 1930s, changes were made to women's baseball player uniforms. These uniforms were known was "plus fours," "apple catchers," or "knickerboxers." Baseball players liked them because the uniforms were modest, while allowing for a wide range of movement.

During the 1930s, The Sportswoman was published. It was a Melbourne based newspaper exclusively dedicated to women's sports. Maise McDiarmed was the newspaper's baseball reporter. This was during an era where the trend was women covered women's sports and men's covered men's sports.

In 1933, the New South Wales Amateur Women's Sport Council was created by Gwendolen Game. The organisation brought together all the women's sporting bodies on the state level. Sports represented included New South Wales's women's field hockey, cricket, women's basketball, baseball, rowing and vigoro. A similar organisation covering similar sports was created in Victoria in 1931.

The 1933 women's baseball season in Queensland started in October.

In 1934, the Victorian Women's Centennial Sports Carnival was held. The event was organised by the Victorian Women's Amateur Sports Council and held at the Melbourne Cricket Grounds. The purpose was to increase women's interest in sport by providing them opportunities to play. Sports that were included on the programme included cricket, field hockey, women's basketball, bowls, rowing, swimming, athletics, rifle shooting, baseball, golf, tennis and badminton. There were over 1,000 bowlers involved over the course a week. Cricket featured a match versus a visiting English side. Women's basketball featured a Victorian side playing against a representative all Australian side. There was a day for watersports such as swimming and rowing. A tennis tournament was held. A field hockey tournament featuring Australian, Kiwi and Fijian teams was played.

The rules for women's baseball in Australia were not formally codified on a national level until 1933. At this time, all the women's state organisations for baseball go together to formally codify them in order to allow interstate competitions to take place. The first formal interstate competition happened in 1934. Prior to 1933, New South Wales and Queensland baseball players pitched overhand. Victorian baseball players pitched underhand. The codifiers of the rules decided that they would use the overhand pitch because the ball was thrown faster and more accurately, making it more difficult to hit. The size of the field was also made smaller than the men's diamond of the time and a smaller ball was to be used. In 1933, the Australian Women's Baseball Association was created as a result of the meeting and rule codification. Western Australia finally joined the organisation in 1936.

In April 1934, the University of Sydney hosted the first women's baseball national championships. When the championships were completed, an All Australian team was selected. All Australian selection was the highest honour a player could get at a time when a national team did not exist. In 1936, the Australians reached out to see about creating a tournament with national teams from Canada, the United States and Japan.

In 1936, the Kelvin Grove baseball club in Brisbane banned women from using their field and equipment to play baseball because the "baseball is nor a woman's game."

In 1938, a Queensland women's baseball team played the Victorian women's baseball team in interstate games at University of Sydney

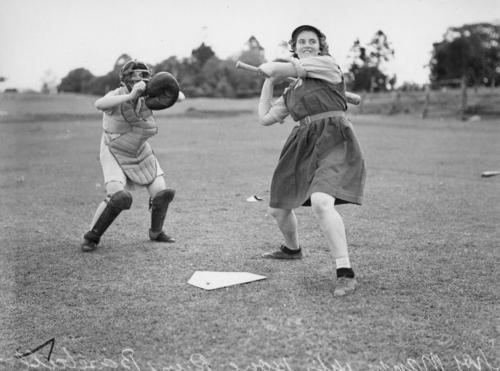
Two girls playing baseball, Brisbane, 1940

In 1940, a study of 314 women in New Zealand and Australia was done. Most of the women in the study were middle class, conservative, Protestant and white. The study found that 183 participated in sport. The twenty-fourth most popular sport that these women participated in was baseball, with 1 women having played the sport. The sport was tied with baseball, bowls, and ice hockey.ç

In 1942, softball was introduced to Australia by American nurses who were in the country because of World War II. Softball was a cross between rounders and baseball. In 1944, the Victorian Women's Softball Association was created. At its inception and the start of a competition organised by the association, it had 29 teams and 250 players. By 1944, softball was integrated into the University of Melbourne teacher physical education coursework. The first president of this organisation was Irene Burrows.

Australian women's sports had an advantage over many other women's sport organisations around the world in the period after World War II. Women's sport organisations had largely remained intact and were holding competitions during the war period. This structure survived in the post war period. Women's sport were not hurt because of food rationing, petrol rationing, population disbursement, and other issues facing post-war Europe.

== Australia Women's Championships ==
- 2026 Melbourne, Victoria - Victoria
- 2025 Melbourne, Victoria - New South Wales
- 2024 melbourne, Victoria - Victoria
- 2023 Melbourne, Victoria - Western Australia
- 2022 Adelaide, South Australia - New South Wales
- 2021 Cancelled due to COVID safety concerns
- 2020 Cancelled due to COVID safety concerns
- 2019 Narrabundah, Australian Capital Territory - Victoria
- 2018 Geelong, Victoria - New South Wales
- 2017 Narrabundah, Australian Capital Territory - Victoria
- 2016 Narrabundah, Australian Capital Territory - New South Wales
- 2015 Narrabundah, Australian Capital Territory - New South Wales
- 2014 Wollongong, New South Wales - New South Wales
- 2013 Ballarat, Victoria – Victoria
- 2012 Canberra – Western Australia
- 2011 Canberra – Victoria
- 2010 Gold Coast, Queensland – Western Australia
- 2009 Geelong, Victoria – Victoria
- 2008 Wollongong, New South Wales – Victoria
- 2007 Perth – Victoria
- 2006 Ipswich, Queensland – New South Wales
- 2005 Melbourne – Victoria
- 2004 Tamworth, New South Wales – Victoria
- 2003 Perth – New South Wales
- 2002 Gold Coast, Queensland – Victoria
- 2001 Sydney – Victoria
- 2000 Melbourne – Victoria
- 1999 Melbourne – Victoria

== See also ==
- Australia Women's Championships (baseball)
- Baseball awards#Australia
- Australia women's national baseball team
- List of baseball teams in Australia

== Bibliography ==
- "WOMEN'S BASEBALL". The Courier-Mail. Brisbane: National Library of Australia. 18 October 1933. p. 8.
- "BASEBALL". The West Australian. Perth: National Library of Australia. 11 August 1938. p. 9.
- Stell, Marion K. (1991). Half the Race, A history of Australian women in sport. North Ryde, Australia: HarperCollins. ISBN 0-207-16971-3.
