= Australian Men's National Ice Hockey Championship =

Annual tournament, Ice Hockey Australia

- Sport: Ice Hockey
- Founded: 1964
- No. of teams: 6
- Most recent champion: Western Australia (6)
- Most titles: Victoria (20)

The Australian Men's National Ice Hockey Championship is an annual elimination tournament for Ice Hockey Australia between each Australian state and territory. It consists of a round robin format tournament, where each state plays another 1 time to determine placement for the sudden death playoff format. The sudden death playoff format consists of 2 semi-final rounds followed by a gold medal game and a bronze medal game.

To be eligible for the Australian National Men's Ice Hockey Championship players must be senior men aged 17 years and older with the condition that players of the Australian Ice Hockey League that are 24 years and older must have played less than 6 games to remain eligible.

== History ==
The origin of this National championship shares a similar origin of a previous tournament with an award bearing the Brown surname but in this case was the father of Jim Brown, the namesake of the Jim Brown Shield that is awarded to the current winners of the Australian Men's National Ice Hockey Championship. The Jim Brown Shield is the third trophy to bear the Brown surname.

=== Previous Awards With the Brown Surname ===
==== F.C. Brown Trophy ====
The F.C. Brown Trophy was first presented in 1928 as an inter-state championship trophy for relay speed skating and presented by Francis Cowan "Buster" Brown for a competition between the Goodall Cup teams from New South Wales and Victoria. The competition consisted of each competitor skating 2 laps of the rink.

In July 1935, the Victorian Ice Hockey Association held a meeting to discuss a suggestion by the New South Wales Ice Hockey Association to hold the competition during the national carnival in Sydney Australia, Sydney in a format that consisted of a series of match races instead of the usual relay style format. The VIHA declined the suggestion due to it being thought to be too much for the state representatives to participate in the National half mile, and quarter mile races as well as now competing in match races on the same evening.

The F.C. Brown Trophy was contested on 20 July 1937 as part of the interstate ice hockey tournament between New South Wales and Victoria for the Goodall Cup at the Sydney Glaciarium.

F.C. Brown Trophy Champions

- 1928 New South Wales
- 1929 New South Wales
- 1930 New South Wales
- 1931 New South Wales
- 1932 New South Wales
- 1933 New South Wales
- 1934 New South Wales
- 1936 Victoria

==== F.C. Brown Memorial Shield ====
Until 1938, the only annual interstate ice hockey championship in Australia was for the most elite ice hockey players in the country consisting of a state team for New South Wales and Victoria competing for the Goodall Cup. In 1938, by request from both New South Wales and Victoria, a second annual interstate tournament was created for the fringe players that did not make selection for the Goodall Cup interstate tournament. This tournament was referred to as the F.C. Brown series or Return Interstate Ice Hockey Series and would be played in the state where the Goodall Cup tournament was not played.

The trophy awarded to the winner of this tournament was named the F.C. Brown Memorial Shield which was in memory of Francis Cowan Brown who had died two years before in 1936. The trophy itself was originally donated by James 'Jimmy' Brown, the son of Francis Cowan Brown.

In 1951 the decision was made to discontinue the F.C. Brown series due to lack of ice time availability and financial issues. The current whereabouts of the F.C. Memorial Shield remains unknown.

F.C. Brown Memorial Shield Champions

- 1951 New South Wales

=== Origin ===
In 1964 the president of the New South Wales Ice Hockey Association, Harry Curtis, donated the Jim Brown Shield for the interstate junior ice hockey tournament aged 18 years and under in the name of James Archibald "Jimmy" Brown who had died five years before.

Currently the trophy is referred to as the Jim Brown Shield and as of the 2015 season it is competed for by men aged 17 years and older with the exception that AIHL players aged 24 years and older must have played less than 6 AIHL games.

== See also ==
- Ice Hockey Australia
- Australian Junior Ice Hockey League
- Australian Ice Hockey League
