= Jim Brown Shield =

Australian ice hockey championship trophy

- Sport: Ice hockey
- Competition: Australian Men's National Ice Hockey Championship
- Awarded for: Interstate tournament champions for men aged 17 years and older *(AIHL players 24 years and older must have played less than 6 AIHL games)

History
- First award: 1963
- Most recent: Western Australia

The Jim Brown Shield is currently an annually awarded interstate ice hockey championship trophy in Australia for senior men aged 17 years and older with the condition that players of the Australian Ice Hockey League that are 24 years and older must have played less than 6 games to remain eligible. The current trophy is in the form of a shield and is the third trophy to bear the Brown family name. The trophy is named after Scottish born James Archibald Brown. The Jim Brown Shield is competed for in a series of games between state representative teams in what is called the Australian Men's National Ice Hockey Championship.

== History ==
Currently, the trophy is referred to as the Jim Brown Shield and as of the 2015 season it is competed for by men aged 17 years and older with the exception that AIHL players aged 24 years and older must have played less than 6 AIHL games.

The Jim Brown Shield has been the award for what is currently known as the Australian Men's National Ice Hockey Championship since its inaugural year in 1963. This tournament was looked at like a reincarnation of the Return Inter-State Series, which ceased to exist around the time of the closing of the Sydney Glaciarium. The Return Inter-state Series would use the F.C. Brown Memorial Shield as its award but this shield was later lost and for the new tournament in 1963, the Jim Brown Shield was donated to the tournament by Harry Curtis and has remained as the perpetual award for the tournament since. The tournament itself remained as a showcase for the players who did not get selected to represent their state to compete for the Goodall Cup in the Inter-state series and was viewed as a stepping stone toward the senior inter-state series.

=== Origin ===
Until 1938, the only annual interstate ice hockey championship in Australia was for the most elite ice hockey players in the country consisting of a state team for New South Wales and Victoria competing for the Goodall Cup. In 1938, by request from both New South Wales and Victoria, a second annual interstate tournament was created for the fringe players that did not make selection for the Goodall Cup interstate tournament. This tournament was referred to as the F.C. Brown series or Return Interstate Ice Hockey Series and would be played in the state where the Goodall Cup tournament was not played.

The trophy awarded to the winner of this tournament was named the F.C. Brown Memorial Shield which was in memory of Francis Cowan Brown who had died two years before in 1936. The trophy itself was originally donated by James 'Jimmy' Brown, the son of Francis Cowan Brown.

In 1951 the decision was made to discontinue the F.C. Brown series due to lack of ice time availability and financial issues. The current whereabouts of the F.C. Memorial Shield remains unknown.

F.C. Brown Memorial Shield Champions

- 1951 New South Wales

== Traditions and Shield History ==
=== Original and Current version ===
There are 2 known versions of the Jim Brown Shield and the current version was altered in 2017.

==== Original Version ====
The original Jim Brown Shield

The original Jim Brown Shield donated by Harry Curtis in 1963 was a timber construction shield that had brass plaques bearing the names of the winning State. It was often presented sitting diagonally inside of a timber frame with glass cover, probably due to it not fitting inside the internal dimensions of the frame when placed upright. It has been identified in team images up until the late 1990s but cannot be seen afterwards, the location of this original shield is currently unknown.

==== Current version ====
The version of the Jim Brown Shield currently being presented is still of timber construction but is a different shape and size to the original 1964 version of the shield. Very little information about its creation has been given and only a keeper trophy had been awarded to the winners of the tournament until the 2018 Australian Men's Ice Hockey Championship. The shield had a long brass plaque on top that read "Jim Brown Trophy" but as of the newest update to the shield, a new plaque has replaced it reading "Inaugural Winner - NSW 1963".

=== The Shield Namesake ===
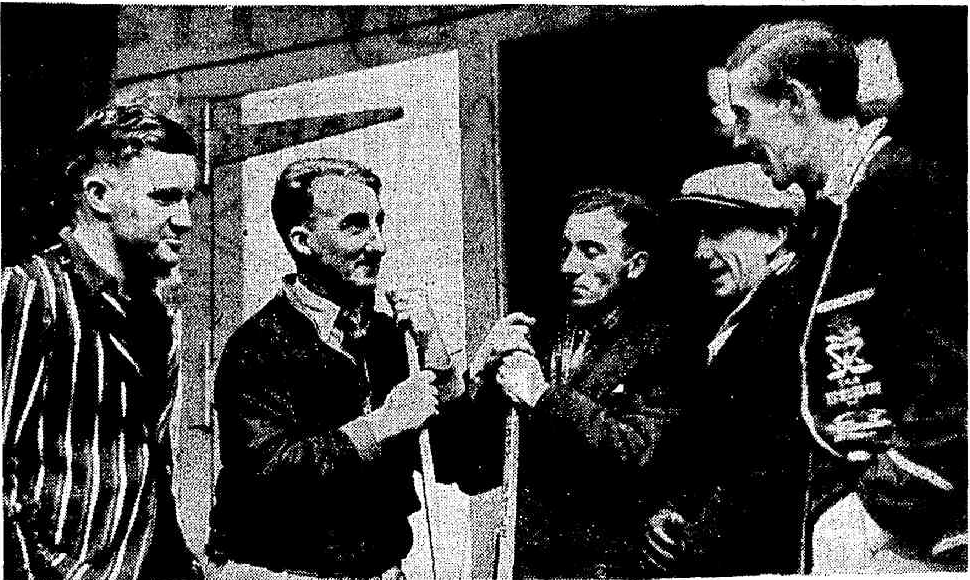
1938 – Jim Brown (second from the left) in Sydney. National Library of Australia

James 'Jim' Archibald Brown was born on 31 March 1908 in Falkirk Scotland. He arrived in Australia with his family when he was 8 years old.

Jim Brown was a one-mile amateur ice-skating champion of Great Britain. He held the Australian half mile record and, on 1 June 1931, beat that record at the Melbourne Glaciarium to set it at 1 minute 45 seconds.

On the evening of Wednesday 13 July 1938, Jim Brown was the captain of the Sydney Glaciarium ice hockey team that defeated the Sydney Ice Palais team by a score of 2-0 in the first series of inter-rink ice hockey games held in Sydney.

=== F.C. Brown Trophy ===
The F.C. Brown Trophy was first presented in 1928 as an inter-state championship trophy for relay speed skating and presented by Francis Cowan "Buster" Brown for a competition between the Goodall Cup teams from New South Wales and Victoria. The competition consisted of each competitor skating 2 laps of the rink. The cup was often referred to by the name Gloria and is the first national award in Australian ice sports to bear the Brown surname, though it was not for ice hockey.

In July 1935, the Victorian Ice Hockey Association held a meeting to discuss a suggestion by the New South Wales Ice Hockey Association to hold the competition during the national carnival in Sydney Australia, Sydney in a format that consisted of a series of match races instead of the usual relay-style format. The VIHA declined the suggestion due to it being thought to be too much for the state representatives to participate in the National half-mile, and quarter-mile races as well as now competing in match races on the same evening.

The F.C. Brown Trophy was contested on 20 July 1937 as part of the interstate ice hockey tournament between New South Wales and Victoria for the Goodall Cup at the Sydney Glaciarium.

F.C. Brown Trophy Champions

- 1928 New South Wales
- 1929 New South Wales
- 1930 New South Wales
- 1931 New South Wales
- 1932 New South Wales
- 1933 New South Wales
- 1934 New South Wales
- 1936 Victoria

== Winners of the Jim Brown Shield ==
- 1963 New South Wales
- 1964 Victoria
- 1965 Victoria
- 1966 Victoria
- 1967 Victoria
- 1968 Victoria
- 1969 Victoria
- 1970 New South Wales
- 1971 Victoria
- 1972 Victoria
- 1973 Victoria
- 1974 New South Wales
- 1975 Queensland
- 1976 Queensland
- 1977 Victoria
- 1978 Victoria
- 1979 New South Wales
- 1980 Western Australia
- 1981 Victoria
- 1982 Victoria
- 1983 Western Australia
- 1984 New South Wales
- 1985 New South Wales
- 1986 Victoria
- 1987 Western Australia
- 1988 Victoria
- 1989 Australian Capital Territory
- 1990 Australian Capital Territory
- 1991 New South Wales
- 1992 Australian Capital Territory
- 1993 South Australia
- 1994 South Australia
- 1995 South Australia
- 1996 South Australia
- 1997 South Australia
- 1998 Victoria
- 1999 South Australia
- 2000 South Australia
- 2001 New South Wales
- 2002 New South Wales
- 2003 New South Wales
- 2004 New South Wales
- 2005 South Australia
- 2006 South Australia
- 2007 New South Wales
- 2008 New South Wales
- 2009 South Australia
- 2010 Victoria
- 2011 Western Australia
- 2012 Victoria
- 2013 South Australia
- 2014 Western Australia
- 2015 Victoria
- 2016 Victoria

Year	Host	Gold	Silver	Result	Bronze	4th Place	Result
2017	Newcastle, NSW(Hunter Ice Skating Stadium)	Queensland	Victoria	2-0	Western Australia	New South Wales	5-1
2018	Perth, WA (Cockburn Ice Arena)	Western Australia	New South Wales	1-0	South Australia	Queensland	5-4
2019	Brisbane, QLD (Ice World Boondall	Queensland	Victoria	2-0	New South Wales	Western Australia	5-3
2020	Not played due to COVID-19 pandemic						
2021	Not played due to COVID-19 pandemic						
2022	Melbourne, VIC (O’Brien Icehouse)	Western Australia	New South Wales	5-1	Victoria	Queensland	7-1
2023	Newcastle, NSW(Hunter Ice Skating Stadium)	Victoria	New South Wales	2-1	Australian Capital Territory	Queensland	6-2

== See also ==
- Ice Hockey Australia
- Australian Junior Ice Hockey League
- Australian Women's Ice Hockey League
- Australian Ice Hockey League
- Goodall Cup
- Joan McKowen Memorial Trophy
