= Australian Women's Ice Hockey League =

Premier women's ice hockey league in Australia

- Current season, competition or edition: 2025–26 AWIHL season
- Sport: Ice hockey
- Founded: 2005 (21 years ago)
- First season: 2007–08
- President: Tim Kitching (IHA)
- Commissioner: Michaela Fellowes
- No. of teams: 6
- Country: Australia
- Headquarters: Melbourne, Victoria, Australia
- Confederation: IHA
- Most recent champions: Perth Inferno (1st title)
- Most titles: Melbourne Ice (9 titles)
- Broadcasters: Thought Fox Media; YouTube
- Level on pyramid: 1
- Website: iha.org.au/competitions/awihl-1

The Australian Women's Ice Hockey League (AWIHL) is Australia's top-tier women's ice hockey league. Established in 2005 as Australia's first women's national league, the AWIHL has amateur status and is sanctioned by Ice Hockey Australia (a member of the International Ice Hockey Federation). The AWIHL is currently contested by six teams from five Australian states, including South Australia, Queensland, New South Wales, Western Australia and Victoria. The league champion is awarded the Joan McKowen Memorial Trophy and the premier is awarded The Gower Memorial Shield (which replaced the Stephanie Boxall Trophy in 2023). The most successful team in AWIHL history is Melbourne Ice (women), who have claimed nine championship titles. The current champion, from 2025–26, is the Perth Inferno (first title).

== History ==
The original AWIHL logo used from 2006 to 2010

=== Beginning ===
==== Showcase Series ====
In 2005, the probability of establishing a national women's ice hockey league was discussed by the National Women's Council. Due to large costs to players to participate in such a league, an alternative proposal for a much shorter Showcase Series was passed around for consideration to begin in the 2006 season. The Series would see four teams competing in mini-tournaments during February to June. Each round robin style tournament would occur over a weekend and throughout the Showcase Series period between February and June, each team would travel twice and host the tournament once. The first Showcase series was planned in February 2006 for Newcastle, New South Wales. The second series would be in March 2006 in Bendigo, Victoria, the third would occur in April 2006 in Canberra, Australian Capital Territory. In May, the series would be held in Adelaide, South Australia, and in June the fifth series would take place in Brisbane, Queensland. At this time, a full season would follow in November 2006 and stretch over into summer 2007.

The first Showcase Series proved to be successful where, in each mini-series, three teams would play each other twice in a round robin style tournament. Five clubs ended up being involved in the Showcase Series which consisted of five mini-tournaments held on a weekend each month in a different city.

The Showcase Series returned for a second season in October 2006, and ran until February 2007. A national women's league did not start in November 2006, as previously hoped. In this second season four mini-series were held, one weekend mini tournament was played each month between only four teams representing Canberra, Australian Capital Territory, Brisbane, Queensland, Adelaide, South Australia and Sydney. The purpose of the Showcase Series continued to be as a precursor to a national women's league that was being actively planned.

==== Forming the AWIHL ====
The official formation of the Australian Women's Ice Hockey League (AWIHL) was in 2007, following the two seasons of "Showcase Series" that were held in 2006 and 2007.

The Australian Women's Ice Hockey League is recognised by Ice Hockey Australia (IHA) as the premier senior women's national ice hockey competition.

The league conducted its inaugural season with four teams: Adelaide Assassins, Brisbane Goannas, Melbourne Dragons, and Sydney Sirens. The team that won the finals series at the end of each season became the AWIHL champions and were presented a perpetual trophy that was donated by Westlakes Trophies and Framing and was called the West Lakes Trophy.

=== 2010s ===
In October 2010, the Australian Women's Ice Hockey League conducted a competition to replace the original league logo with a new one. The competition closed 1 December 2010, and the original logo was replaced by the current one.

In the early 2010s there was a move to align AWIHL teams with Australian Ice Hockey League (AIHL) counterparts. This strategy led to three of the four AWIHL teams to either sign a memorandum of understanding or merge with AIHL teams to create dual program organisations. The Melbourne Dragons became the Melbourne Ice by signing a MOU, that allowed the Dragons management to remain in control of the team. Adelaide Assassins became the Adelaide Adrenaline and Sydney Sirens became the North Star Sirens. Both Adelaide and Sydney would later return to being independently run organisations, but the Ice remain in the league since 2010.

In 2016, IHA announced the formation of the annual Australian Women's Tier 2 Show Case Series (AW2SCS) to act as a feeder league to the AWIHL and provide a development pathway from state leagues to the AWIHL. Initially the league had four teams based in Canberra, Sydney and Melbourne (x2). By 2019 the AW2SCS had five teams and had expanded to Adelaide and Perth.

The AWIHL officially expanded in August 2018 for the first time, with the introduction of the Perth Inferno to the league. Perth had played two exhibition games against the Sydney Sirens the season before and had competed in and won the Australian Women's Tier 2 Show Case Series two years in a row on their road to AWIHL entry.

Two AWIHL teams featured in Australasia's Best Sporting Team list 2019. The list, conducted by Platinum Asset Management and GAIN LINE Analytics, ranked and named the top 25 sporting teams in Australasia. In 2019, AWIHL teams, Sydney Sirens and Melbourne Ice were ranked inside the top 25 sporting teams. The Sirens were ranked twenty-first and Melbourne Ice were ranked twenty-third.

=== COVID-19 period ===
The AWIHL, like many other Australian sporting leagues, was forced to cancel two consecutive league seasons due to multiple COVID-19 outbreaks and border and health response restrictions between 2020 and 2022. In August 2022, AWIHL Commissioner, Melissa Rulli, officially stepped down from her position after nearly five years in the role. Rulli held the position of Commissioner from December 2017 to August 2022 and oversaw steady viewership and accessibility growth of the AWIHL in that time until the COVID-19 hiatus. Ice Hockey Australia opened an expression of interest process on 26 August 2022 to find Rulli's replacement, with applications closing on 16 September 2022. This provides IHA enough time to appoint a new Commissioner ahead of the 2022–23 season start in November 2022.

=== 2020s ===
After a two-year hiatus, the AWIHL announced it would return to action for the 2022–23 season, scheduled to kick off in November 2022 and run through til March 2023. The Sydney Sirens secured their first back-to-back championship title by lifting the JMK Memorial Trophy in 2023. In early 2023, the Melbourne Ducks applied to enter the AWIHL as an expansion team. The Ducks entered into playing exhibition games ahead of a decision on an AWIHL license. In 2024, the Perth Inferno secured their first AWIHL title, claiming the 2024 Premiership. The Melbourne Ice defeated Perth in the grand-final in 2024 to claim their eighth championship title.

== Teams ==
As of 2026, the AWIHL has six active teams, including four founding members and two expansion teams. The six teams are from five different Australian states and capital cities, including, Queensland, New South Wales, Victoria, South Australia and Western Australia.

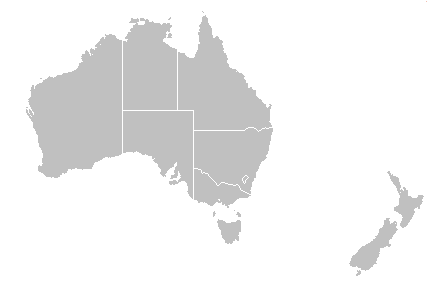

Australian Women's Ice Hockey League
Team	Colours	City	State	Arena	Founded	Joined	Former names	Notes
Adelaide Rush		Adelaide	(South Australia)	IceArenA	2006		Adelaide Assassins (2006–10); Adelaide Adrenaline (2011–15)	Was a part of Adelaide Adrenaline organisation for 4 seasons
Brisbane Lightning		Brisbane	(Queensland)	Boondall Iceworld	2006		Brisbane Goannas (2006–21)	Became part of the Brisbane Lightning organisation in 2022
Melbourne Ice		Melbourne	(Victoria (state))	O'Brien Icehouse	2006		Melbourne Dragons (2006–10)	Signed a MOU with the Melbourne Ice organisation in 2010
Perth Inferno		Perth	(Western Australia)	Cockburn Ice Arena	2018			2018 AWIHL expansion team
Sydney Sirens		Sydney	(New South Wales)	Macquarie Ice Rink	2006		North Star Sirens (2011–13)	Was a part of Newcastle Northstars organisation for 2 seasons
Melbourne Ducks		Melbourne	(Victoria (state))	IceHQ	2023	2026		Played AWIHL exhibition games in 2023 and 2024 before joining fully.

=== Future expansion ===
Future expansion has been mooted, including into New Zealand, which, since 2014, runs a four team national league of its own, NZWIHL, but there are no active bids to join the league. Melbourne Chargers Ice Hockey Club, who compete in the Women's Tier 2 Show Case Series, have publicly said their goal is to move up divisions to the AWIHL. The club is working towards that goal and have signed a partnership with AIHL team Melbourne Mustangs, to help them on their way to achieving this goal. In the 2019–20 Annual Report, IHA, stated its intentions to seek an increase in the number of teams participating in AWIHL to six teams.

=== Team history ===
==== Adelaide Rush ====
Adelaide was one of the four founding teams of the AWIHL in 2007 and also competed in the showcase series in 2006. Originally established as the Adelaide Assassins, the South Australian outfit began life as the dominant force in women's hockey in Australia, winning the first five straight AWIHL championship titles. In 2011–12, the team merged and became part of the Adelaide Adrenaline organisation. Between 2011–12 and 2015–16 the Adrenaline ran both the women's and men's programs in the AWIHL and AIHL. Ahead of the 2016–17 season, the AWIHL team parted ways with the Adrenaline and the new organisation was established to run the AWIHL licence in Adelaide, the Adelaide Rush.

==== Brisbane Lightning ====
Brisbane was the first team to join the AWIHL in 2006. They participated in the showcase series in 2006 and was one of the four founding teams in the AWIHL in 2007. Setup as a not-for-profit incorporated sporting organisation, the Brisbane, Queensland-based club was known as the Brisbane Goannas from establishment until 2022. The team has run a successful junior to senior development program known as the Gecko's to Goannas Program. On 3 October 2022, the Goannas announced they had partnered with the Brisbane Lightning organisation, who had their men's program accepted into the AIHL for 2023, and officially changed their name to match, becoming the Brisbane Lightning.

==== Melbourne Ducks ====
The Melbourne Ducks women's program was established in early 2023 and formally submitted an application to join the AWIHL on 7 March 2023. Six exhibition games against AWIHL opposition was organised over the 2023-24 AWIHL season. The Ducks played another six exhibition games during the 2024-25 AWIHL season with the intention of securing a license to join the league proper in 2025–26. The Ducks finally joined the AWIHL regular season in 2025-26 playing home games at iceHQ in Reservoir, Melbourne. The addition of the Ducks established the first AWIHL crosstown derby with the Melbourne Ice.

==== Melbourne Ice ====
Melbourne was one of the four founding teams of the AWIHL in 2007. Established in 2005 as Melbourne Dragons, in 2010, the team entered into a memorandum of understanding with the Melbourne Ice organisation that runs a men's program in the Australian Ice Hockey League. The agreement saw the Dragons change their name and branding to match the Melbourne Ice and a sharing of off-ice resources and guidance. However, the Dragons organisation retained a lot of self-control and is run as a separate club with their own committee. The team is nine-time AWIHL champions and five-time AWIHL premiers. They are the most successful top-tier ice hockey team in Australia.

==== Sydney Sirens ====
Sydney was one of the four founding teams of the AWIHL in 2007. The Sirens began in Sydney, New South Wales at the Sydney Ice Arena but over the years the team has moved around, playing at Canterbury Olympic Ice Rink, Penrith Ice Palace, Liverpool Catholic Club Ice Rink and Macquarie Ice Rink. Between 2011 and 2013 the team became a part of the Newcastle Northstars organisation and relocated to Hunter Ice Skating Stadium and was renamed North Star Sirens. When the team returned to Sydney, they reverted to their old name, Sydney Sirens. The Sirens are three-time AWIHL champions and three-time AWIHL premiers.

==== Perth Inferno ====
Perth are the first ever expansion team in the AWIHL history. The Perth Inferno officially joined the league in July 2018, becoming the fifth AWIHL team. Donning purple and orange, the Inferno began as the Western Australian representative team, they went on to play two exhibition games during the 2017–18 season against the Sydney Sirens before joining the AWIHL regular season in 2018–19.

== Season structure and rules ==
=== Regular season ===
The AWIHL regular season is played between October and March each year. The regular season consists of 30 games in total, with each team playing twelve games. Each team will play two games every scheduled weekend during the regular season. There is no overtime period played in the AWIHL regular season. In the event of a tied score at the end of regulation time, a penalty shootout will determine the winner of a game. If there is no time for a shootout to occur, a draw will be declared.

=== Game length ===
The AWIHL has adopted the international standard three 20-minute stop-time periods length for all regular season and finals regulation time periods. The AWIHL was the first national competition under Ice Hockey Australia to implement these international standards in 2018–19. Prior to 2018–19, the AWIHL played 54 minute games, with 17 minutes played in each of the first two periods, followed by a full 20 minute third period. Teams are allowed a minimum of 5 minutes warm-up before each game and are allowed one 30 second timeout during regulation game time.

=== Game rules and points system ===
The AWIHL has adopted the current International Ice Hockey Federation Official Rule Book for playing rules. The AWIHL points system, follows similar systems widely used in Europe. 3 points is awarded for a regulation time win, 2 points for a shootout win, 1 point for a shootout loss and 0 points for a regulation time loss. In the unlikely event of a draw, both teams will be awarded 1 point each.

=== Import rules ===
AWIHL teams are allowed to sign a maximum of four imports for their team's roster for any given season. Teams are allowed to dress a maximum of three imports for any given AWIHL game with one exception, the team who finished last in the league standings the season before is allowed to dress all four imports for any given AWIHL game. Import goaltenders is prohibited in the AWIHL. This regulation was implemented to support the Australian national women's teams.

An import is defined as someone without Australian citizenship or permanent residency. New Zealand residents who move to Australia under the Trans-Tasman Travel Arrangement are counted as imports for the first two consecutive seasons, after that they are exempted from the import rules and count as a ‘local’ player. If they cease to live permanently in Australia, they lose their exemption status and must start the process over.

=== Playoffs ===
Playoffs are known in the AWIHL as the Finals. They are played over a single weekend in a chosen location. The AWIHL Commission chooses the finals location. The Finals Weekend involves four games in total, two semi-finals played on the Saturday followed by a third-place playoff and grand final on the Sunday. The top four tams from the regular season qualify for the finals weekend. The top seed plays the fourth seed in the first semi final followed by two verses three in the second semi. Unlike in the regular season, overtime can be played in finals games. The AWIHL implements a 4v4 stop time overtime period of 10 minutes in accordance with the IIHF Rule Book. The winner of the grand final is named AWIHL champion and lifts the Joan McKowen Memorial Trophy and has their name inscribed on the original trophy, retained in the IHA Office. Gold, silver and bronze medals are given to rostered players and team officials on the teams who finish first, second and third in finals.

== League champions ==
=== AWIHL champions by seasons (2006–present) ===
Season-by-season Championships and Premierships
Season	(gold) Champion	(silver) Silver	(bronze) Bronze	Premier	Runner-up
2006	Adelaide Assassins
2006–07	Adelaide Assassins
2007–08	Adelaide Assassins
2008–09	Adelaide Assassins	Sydney Sirens	Brisbane Goannas	Sydney Sirens	Adelaide Assassins
2009–10	Adelaide Assassins	Sydney Sirens	Melbourne Dragons	Adelaide Assassins	Sydney Sirens
2010–11	Melbourne Ice	Sydney Sirens	Adelaide Assassins	Sydney Sirens	Melbourne Ice
2011–12	Adelaide Adrenaline	Melbourne Ice	North Star Sirens	Adelaide Adrenaline	Melbourne Ice
2012–13	Melbourne Ice	Adelaide Adrenaline	Brisbane Goannas	Melbourne Ice	Adelaide Adrenaline
2013–14	Melbourne Ice	Adelaide Adrenaline	Brisbane Goannas	Melbourne Ice	Adelaide Adrenaline
2014–15	Melbourne Ice	Sydney Sirens	Adelaide Adrenaline	Melbourne Ice	Adelaide Adrenaline
2015–16	Melbourne Ice	Sydney Sirens	Adelaide Adrenaline	Melbourne Ice	Sydney Sirens
2016–17	Sydney Sirens	Brisbane Goannas	Melbourne Ice	Sydney Sirens	Brisbane Goannas
2017–18	Melbourne Ice	Sydney Sirens	Brisbane Goannas	Sydney Sirens	Melbourne Ice
2018–19	Melbourne Ice	Sydney Sirens	Perth Inferno	Melbourne Ice	Sydney Sirens
2019–20	Sydney Sirens	Adelaide Rush	Melbourne Ice	Sydney Sirens	Adelaide Rush
2022–23	Sydney Sirens	Melbourne Ice	Perth Inferno	Melbourne Ice	Sydney Sirens
2023–24	Melbourne Ice	Perth Inferno	Adelaide Rush	Perth Inferno	Adelaide Rush
2024–25	Melbourne Ice	Brisbane Lightning	Perth Inferno	Adelaide Rush	Perth Inferno
2025–26	Perth Inferno	Brisbane Lightning	Melbourne Ice	Perth Inferno	Brisbane Lightning

=== AWIHL champions' all-time records ===
All-time Championships
Team	# Titles	Years
Adelaide Rush	6	2006, 2007, 2008, 2009, 2010, 2012
Melbourne Ice	9	2011, 2013, 2014, 2015, 2016, 2018, 2019, 2024, 2025
Perth Inferno	1	2026
Sydney Sirens	3	2017, 2020, 2023

== Trophies ==
=== Joan McKowen Memorial Trophy ===
Since 2010–11, the Joan McKowen Memorial Trophy has been the highest title honour in the AWIHL. The trophy is awarded to the AWIHL champions, the team that wins the grand final of the finals weekend (playoffs) at the end of each season. The trophy is named after Joan McKowen, who was a prominent figure in Australian Ice Hockey before her death in 1992. Her husband, Maxwell McKowen donated the trophy for its first use as the prize for the annual national women's ice hockey tournament in 1995.

=== Gower Memorial Shield ===
Taking over from the Stephanie Boxall Trophy in 2023, is the Gower Memorial Shield. The trophy is awarded to the winner of the premiership title each season in the AWIHL. The title is decided by the team who finished top of the league standings at the conclusion of the regular season. The shield is named after Keira Gower, one of the pioneers of women's ice hockey in Australia. Keira was likely born in England and migrated to Australia with her family in 1910. She was the first captain of the Victorian Ladies Ice Hockey Club, who competed in the inaugural women's interstate ice hockey tournament in 1922. The first Australian trophy for women's interstate ice hockey, the Gower Cup, was named after her father Henry Gower.

=== Former trophies ===
==== West Lakes Trophy ====
For the first three seasons of the AWIHL, between 2007–08 and 2009–10, the West Lakes Trophy was the championship trophy for the league. However, in 2010–11, the AWIHL secured and introduced the Joan McKowen Memorial Trophy for the championship. The West Lakes Trophy was subsequently re-purposed to become the premiership trophy for AWIHL teams who finish top of the regular season standings at the end of each season. But this was later replaced by the Stephanie Boxall Trophy.

==== Stephanie Boxall Trophy ====
Taking over from the West Lakes Trophy in 2020 and last awarded in 2022, was the Stephanie Boxall Trophy. The trophy was awarded to the winner of the premiership in the AWIHL, the team that finishes top of the league standings at the conclusion of the regular season. The trophy is named after Stephanie Boxall, who was a pioneer of the women's game in Australia. Originally playing boys before the women's game was established, Steph took on the sport's ruling body in the 1980s and won the right for women to continue to participate in men's ice hockey after the national body tried to ban women due to fears of being sued if a woman got hurt. This helped paved the way for the establishment of the women's game in Australia. Steph was an inaugural member of the Australian national team and National Women's Championship when it started in 1995. She went on to captain Australia and has been called the “best female ice hockey player Australia has ever had”. Steph is the first Australian, and is one of only six women, to be named in the Hockey Hall of Fame in Toronto, Canada.

== Individual awards ==
Each season, ahead of, or at, the beginning of the AWIHL Finals, the league announces the winners of the individual player awards that recognises excellence across a number of different categories.

AWIHL individual awards
Season	MVP	Rookie	Goalie	Defence	Forward	Points
2012–13		(Australia) Kate Tihema	(Australia) Courtney Rea	(Australia) Sari Lehmann	(Australia) Andrea Steranko	(Australia) Andrea Steranko	52
2014–15		(Australia) Courtney Poole
2015–16		(Australia) Emily Davis-Tope	(Australia) Michelle Coonan	(Australia) Amelia Matheson	(Australia) Sharna Godfrey	(Australia) Sharna Godfrey	36
2017–18	(Australia) Stephanie Cochrane	(Australia) Marnie Pullin	(Australia) Keesha Aitkins	(Canada) Erin Beaver	(United States) Ashley Pelkey	(Canada) Jessica Pinkerton	26
2018–19	(Australia) Sharna Godfrey	(Australia) Olivia Last	(Turkey) Sera Dogramaci	(Australia) Amelia Matheson	(Canada) Christina Julien	(Canada) Christina Julien	37
2019–20	(Australia) Natasha Farrier	(Australia) Courtney Mahoney	(Australia) Michelle Coonan	(Canada) Sarah Edney	(United States) Kayla Nielsen	(United States) Kayla Nielsen	31
2022–23	*Not awarded	(Australia) Katrina Rapchuk	(Australia) Makayla Peers	(Canada) Sarah Edney	(Canada) Danielle Butler	(United States) Elizabeth Scala	32
2023–24	*Not awarded	(Australia) Katie Meyer	(Australia) Sasha King	(Canada) Maya Tupper	(Canada) Sarah Edney	(Australia) Michelle Clark-Crumpton	38
2024–25	*Not awarded	(Australia) Anika Wegund	(Australia) Imogen Perry	(Australia) Georgia McLellan	(Canada) Jordan Kulbida	(United States) Elizabeth Scala	37
2025–26	(United States) Ani FitzGerald	(Australia) Olivia Gargano	(Australia) Sasha King	(Australia) Kirsty Venus	(Australia) Sara Sammons	(Australia) Sara Sammons	50

== See also ==
- Ice Hockey Australia
- Joan McKowen Memorial Trophy
- Australian Ice Hockey League
- Australian Junior Ice Hockey League
- Jim Brown Trophy
- Goodall Cup
