= Western Australian Ice Hockey Association =

Governing body of ice hockey in Western Australia

Ice Hockey Western Australia
- Sport: Ice hockey
- Jurisdiction: Western Australia
- Abbreviation: IHWA
- Founded: February 1950
- Affiliation: Ice Hockey Australia
- Headquarters: Palmyra, WA
- President: Sydney Fricker
- Vice president: Alicia Kelly
- Secretary: Deon Shearer

Official website
- ihwa.org.au
- (Australia)
- (Western Australia)

The Western Australian Ice Hockey Association, currently trading as Ice Hockey Western Australia is the governing body of ice hockey in Western Australia. Ice Hockey WA is a branch of Ice Hockey Australia.

Ice Hockey Western Australia (IHWA) was formed as the Western Australian state branch for Ice Hockey Australia. It is responsible for organising the four state leagues. It is also responsible for selecting the state teams to compete in the national tournaments.

IHWA operates its leagues across two venues – Cockburn Ice Arena and Perth Ice Arena. Teams are fielded in the leagues by four clubs. Two clubs are based at Cockburn Ice Arena - Hawks Ice Hockey Club and Bravehearts Ice Hockey Club. The other two clubs are based at Perth Ice Arena - West Coast Ice Hockey Association and Northern Ice Hockey Association. The IHWA current president is Sydney Fricker.

== History ==
=== 1949: The First Ice Rink in Western Australia ===
On 22 September 1949, a prospectus was written to introduce the first ice rink to Western Australia. The first ice skating rink built in Western Australia was the Perth Ice Palais. It was located on Beaufort Street, Northbridge inside the remodeled Tivoli Theatre. The rink was being built by Ice Palais Ltd. and Bruce Carrol was the chairman of directors, who stated that even with the completion date of the rink being weeks away there were already plans by Perth sporting clubs to make ice hockey teams. The rink surface was much smaller than other rinks in Australia at only 29m (95 feet) long and 26m (85 feet)wide. Though private skating lessons first began at 9:00am 12 December 1949, the rink was officially opened at 8:00pm 14 December 1949 by, then, Perth mayor Mr. J. Totterdell. The first manager of the rink was Edson R. Banks.

The first competitive ice sport conducted by the Ice Palais Pty LTD was ice basketball and approximately 60 members of the Collegians High Sports Club began training for ice sports, assisted by Mr. H. W. White. The Collegians were the first Perth based ice sports team formed 30 January 1950, and were quickly followed by the formation of a second team called the Western Dodgers the following month. The intention was to train to play ice basketball as the rink surface was too small to play ice hockey on, being less than half of the required length of a standard ice rink. The teams would train every Sunday at the Perth Ice Palais and the Western Dodgers had the help of two premiership winning Victorian players, Ray Abbot and Bob Cody, for coaching the first team.

The first game of ice basketball in Perth was between two women's teams, the Wildcats and the Bulldogs on 22 May 1950. The men played ice basketball for the first time in the Perth Ice Palais on 13 June 1950 in a game between the Western Dodgers and the Collegians. There was the intention to play ice hockey as well a month later with the Collegians and Western Dogers having already invested a total of £500 in ice hockey equipment combined.

=== Formation of The West Australian Ice Hockey Association ===
The formation of the first ice hockey association in Western Australia began at the time when a second club joined the Collegians in forming an ice hockey team in February 1950. The original two teams that formed the West Australian Ice Hockey Association were the following:

- Collegians
- Western Dodgers

The first game of ice hockey in Western Australia was between the Western Dodgers and the Colligians on the evening of 3 July 1950 at 8:30pm. The Western Dodgers won the game by a score of 4 -2.

These were some of members of the first two teams:

Collegians: W. Rossiter, Peter Logan, Brian Strack, D. Whitehead

Western Dodgers: Laurie Anderson, R. Cody

Shortly after the first game of ice hockey played in Perth a 22 year old recent migrant, Bob Pals, began planning to form a team composed entirely of Dutch migrants. Bob Pals had represented the Netherlands in the 1948 World Amateur Championships held in Montreux, Switzerland. Bob's younger brother was the goaltender for the Netherlands in 11 internationals. Other members of the proposed Dutch team were a seven time medalist for long distance skating in the Netherlands, Lue Markies; a leading figure and dance skater Louis Kramer; and another member of the national ice hockey team for the Netherlands, Rudi Williams, who also played ice hockey for the Amsterdam Icebergs. There were three potential names that were going to be used for this new ice hockey club; the Lions, the Penguins and the Icebergs.

The name for the new Dutch migrant ice hockey team was the Penguins, who formed on 28 September 1950 to expand the Association to three teams.

When the 1951 ice hockey season began, the West Australian Ice Hockey Association expanded to four teams with the addition of a new team called the Magpies.

== State leagues ==
- Premier League – The top senior league in Western Australia. This is a male-only checking league.
- Senior League – Non-Checking mixed league currently with four divisions.
- Junior League – Under 18, divided into age groups 9/U, 11/U, 13/U, 15/U and 18/U.
- Sled Hockey - run in conjunction with Inclusive Skating.
- Perth Women's Ice Hockey League - Women's league currently comprising six teams, run over the summer months

== Australian leagues ==
IHWA fields teams in the following national Australian leagues run by Ice Hockey Australia:

- Australian Ice Hockey League - Perth Thunder
- Australian Women’s Ice Hockey League - Perth Inferno
- Australian Junior Ice Hockey League - Perth Sharks

== 2012 teams ==
Teams playing in the 2012 season:

SuperLeague

- Cockburn Hawks
- Northern Vikings
- West Coast Flyers
- West Coast Lightning

WA Conference

- Cockburn Badhawks
- Cockburn Blackhawks
- Cockburn Redhawks
- Northern Vikings
- West Coast Avalanche
- West Coast Flyers
- West Coast Lightning

Seniors Division 1 & 2

- Cockburn Blackhawks
- Cockburn Redhawks
- Knights IHC
- Northern Vikings
- Panthers IHC
- Pirates IHC
- West Coast Patriots
- West Coast Flyers

Midgets

- Cockburn Blackhawks
- Cockburn Icehawks
- Cockburn Redhawks
- Spartans IHC
- West Coast Avalanche
- West Coast Flyers

Peewee

- Cockburn Blackhawks
- Cockburn Redhawks
- Dragons IHC
- West Coast Flyers

== 2013 teams ==
Teams playing in the 2013 season:

SuperLeague

- Flyers (West Coast)
- Hawks (Cockburn)
- Vikings (Northern)
- Lightning (West Coast)

WA Conference (Checking League)

- Flyers (West Coast)
- Vikings (Northern)
- RedHawks (Cockburn)
- Lightning (West Coast)
- Avalanche (West Coast)

Seniors Division 1 & 2

- Vikings (Northern)
- TomaHawks (Cockburn)
- BadHawks (Cockburn)
- Patriots (West Coast)
- Pirates (Northern)
- Panthers (Northern)
- Flyers (West Coast)
- Lightning (West Coast)
- RedHawks (Cockburn)
- Avalanche (West Coast)
- BlackHawks (Cockburn)
- Knights (Northern)

Midgets

- Flyers (West Coast)
- Lightning (West Coast)
- BlackHawks (Cockburn)
- Spartans (Northern)
- IceHawks (Cockburn)

Peewee

- Flyers (West Coast)
- BlackHawks (Cockburn)
- Dragons
- RedHawks (Cockburn)

== 2014 teams ==
Teams playing in the 2014 season:

SuperLeague

- Flyers
- Blackhawks
- Vikings
- Lightning

Seniors Division 1

- Mohawks
- Warhawks
- Patriots
- Artic
- Tomahawks
- Badhawks
- Flyers

Seniors Division 2

- Avalanche
- Nighthawks
- Pirates
- Lightning
- Apaches
- Vikings
- Redhawks
- Blackhawks
- Panthers
- Knights

Midgets

- Flyers
- BlackHawks
- Spartans
- IceHawks

Peewee

- Flyers
- BlackHawks
- Dragons
- RedHawks

== Presidents ==
- 1986 - Ian Curedale
- Paul McCann
- Sydney Fricker 2022–present

== See also ==
- Ice Hockey Australia
