= Joan McKowen Memorial Trophy =

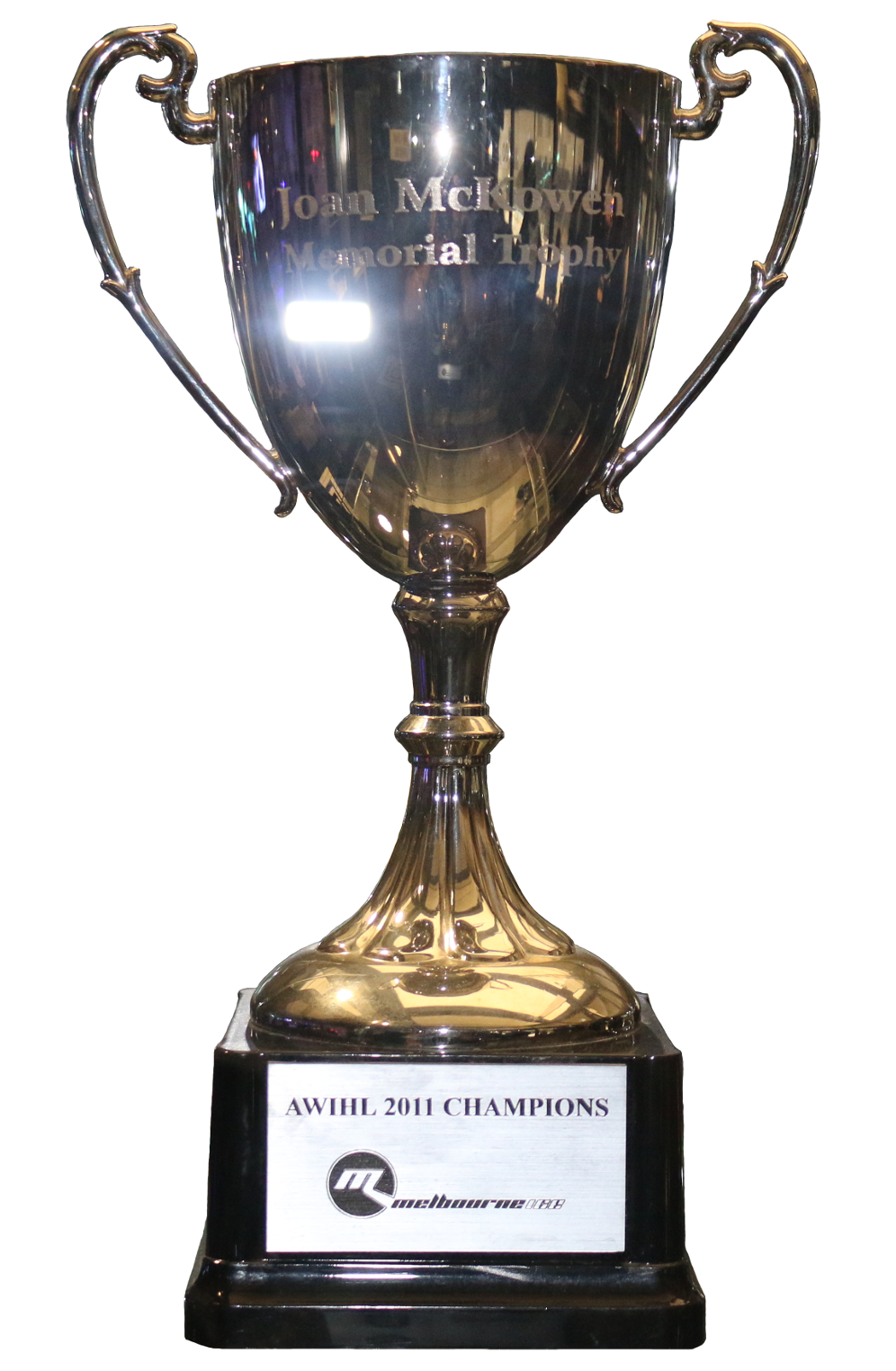
- Sport: Ice hockey
- Awarded for: Playoff champion of the Australian Women's Ice Hockey League

History
- First award: 1995
- Most recent: Sydney Sirens

The Joan McKowen Memorial Trophy is the annually awarded championship trophy, of the Australian Women's Ice Hockey League (AWIHL), to the winner of the AWIHL finals. Originally donated in 1995, the trophy is named after Joan McKowen who died September 15, 1992 and her husband Maxwell McKowen died in 2010.

This trophy originated from a women's ice hockey championship tournament that started in 1994, which was a competition that was hosted in Queensland between a New South Wales team and a Queensland team competing. This invitational Women's tournament was just the beginning and saw the New South Wales team winning the championship. From this competition, the Joan McKowen Memorial Trophy began, first being awarded in February 1995. This event was held annually and served as the Australian senior women's national ice hockey championship.

The Joan McKowen Memorial Trophy began being annually awarded after the Queensland women's invitational tournament in 1994 and was awarded to the winner of the Australian women's national ice hockey tournament until 2010.

== History ==
=== Beginnings ===
A development league started in 1994-1995 which consisted of: Under 14, Under 16, Under 18, and Under 21 women's ice hockey teams. After Queensland hosted the Women's Invitational Tournament, where they played the New South Wales team in 1994, the introduction of 4 state teams for the senior women's national tournament followed in 1995 and the Joan McKowen Memorial Trophy was awarded as an annual trophy to the winner of the senior women's national ice hockey tournament. The original 4 teams represented: New South Wales, Australian Capital Territory, Western Australia and Queensland.

The first senior women's national ice hockey final was held in Sydney, New South Wales in February 1995.

The first team to win the Joan McKowen Memorial Trophy in the inaugural tournament was the senior women's New South Wales team in February 1995, with the following individual rewards from the tournament:

Most Valuable Player Stephanle Wheaten - ACT

Goaltender Award Jade Rose - ACT

Highest Points Scorer Stephanie Wheaten - ACT

The All Star line up consisted of the following players:

1st All Star Line

- Wendy Ovenden NSW
- Susan Davies QLD
- Lyn Leal WA
- Stephanle Wheaten ACT
- Kim Herbert NSW
- Cindy Morgan NSW

2nd All Star Line

- Miri Hamilton-Yates NSW
- Katie Kelly Qld
- Kelly Skinner Qld
- Tina Morgan NSW
- Linda Clift Qld
- Renee Armstrong WA

=== 1996 & USA Selects ===
In only its third season, there was concern for the survival of the women's tournament in 1996, when Queensland needed to withdraw from hosting the tournament. The New South Wales Ice Hockey Association were able to rescue the tournament and also host the national woman's championships in the newly renovated Canterbury Olympic Ice Rink. This year, 4 teams competed in the tournament: New South Wales, Australian Capital Territory, Western Australia and South Australia. This was South Australia's debut into the national competition.

Queensland were unable to compete and withdrew their team from the competition this year.

As well as the tournament, this year included a series of exhibition games between Australia and a United States visiting team from Assabet Valley, Massachusetts.

The schedule for the tournament was as follows:

Wed Aug 21, 1996 8.00 pm Opening ceremony; Australia vs USA.

Thursday August 22, 1996 7.35 am New South Wales vs Australian Capital Territory. 9.10 am South Australia vs Western Australia. 10.45 am USA (Assabet) vs Australia 3.35 pm Australian Capital Territory vs South Australia. 5.45 pm New South Wales vs Western Australia.

Friday August 23, 1996 6.00 am New South Wales vs South Australia. 7.35 am Australian Capital Territory vs Western Australia. 9.10 am Australia vs USA (Assabet)

Saturday August 24, 1996 12.40 pm Australia vs USA (Assabet)

Sunday August 25, 1996 7.00 am First semifinal (1 vs 4 on ladder) 9.05 am Second semifinal (2 vs 3 on ladder) 3.30 pm Grand Final (NSW 5 vs Canberra 3)

An additional exhibition match between New South Wales vs United States (Assabet Valley), at 8pm on Monday 26 August, which was played at the Blacktown Ice Rink.

The results of the tournament were: (1st)New South Wales, (2nd)Australian Capital Territory, (3rd)South Australia, (4th)Western Australia. New South Wales won the Joan McKowen Memorial Trophy after defeating the Australian Capital Territory with a score of 5-3 in the final game.

Individual Awards

- MVP: Stephanie Wheaton - ACT
- Highest Pointscore: Stephanie Wheaton - ACT
- Best Forward: Ellen Jones - NSW
- Best Defence: Wendy Ovenden - NSW
- Rookie Award: Melinda White - QLD (10 years old)
- Goaltender: Emily Connaughton - ACT (on loan to ACT from NSW)

This tournament also marked the very first National Australian women's ice hockey team.

Australia vs USA exhibition games, Australian players:

1st All Star Line

- Stephanie Wheaten ACT
- Ellen Jones NSW
- Mellssa Rulli NSW
- Wendy Overton NSW
- Tina Morgan NSW
- Delphine de Mulder NSW

2nd All Star Line

- Candice Mitchell SA
- Melanie Singh ACT
- Esra Dogramau NSW
- Amanda Fenton SA
- Kylie Pedler WA
- Rebecca Jalleh SA

Visiting along with the American team was Heather Linstad, coach from Northeastern University. Linstad acted as Head Coach for the Elite Development Camp.

=== 1997 expansion ===
The competition quickly grew following a successful 1996 tournament, with the inclusion of a Victorian team and the reintroduction of the Queensland team that withdrew from the competition in the year before. The four-day tournament was held in the Australian Capital Territory and marked the third annual competition for the Joan McKowen Memorial Trophy.

Teams from New South Wales (NSW), Australian Capital Territory (ACT), South Australia (SA), Western Australia (WA), Queensland (QLD) and Victoria (VIC), where Victoria was making its debut in the national competition. The tournament was officially opened by Australian Ice Hockey Federation President Phillip Ginsberg.

The tournament began on July 3, 1997, with a curtain-raiser exhibition match between the 1996 Joan McKowen Memorial Trophy Champions, New South Wales, and the previous year's runners-up, Australian Capital Territory. The game was won by New South Wales, 3–2.

The finals were held on Sunday July 6, 1997 and saw the New South Wales team defeat the Australian Capital Territory team by a score of 4–1 to win their third Joan McKowen Memorial Trophy.

Individual awards:

Most Valuable Player (MVP) – Rebecca Jalleh - SA

Best Forward – Stephanie Wheaton - ACT

Best Defenceman Amanda Fenton - SA

Goaltender Award Rebecca Jalleh - SA

Rookie Award Shelley Orr - WA

=== 2009 ===
The year 2009 marked the last year that the Joan McKowen Memorial Trophy was held as an interstate round robin tournament, named Nationals Joan McKowen Tournament JMK 2009. The 4 teams that were involved in the 3 game tournament represented New South Wales, Victoria, Australian Capital Territory and Queensland. New South Wales won all 3 games in the national tournament.

=== 2010 AWIHL ===
After the death of Max McKowen in 2010, the decision was made to continue awarding the trophy to honor their memory by giving the trophy to the Australian Women's Ice Hockey League (AWIHL) to be awarded to the champions of the finals competition. The first AWIHL team to win the Joan McKowen Memorial Trophy was the Melbourne Ice. The trophy continues to be the trophy awarded to the AWIHL finals champions.

== Traditions ==
The Joan McKowen Memorial Trophy is awarded annually and the champion team from each season has a replica cup made as a "keeper" trophy. The original Joan McKowen Memorial Trophy had never been presented in an AWIHL championship game until 2018.

== Tournament Structure ==
The finals tournament for the trophy is referred to as a "gold medal" tournament, where the winner is awarded the Joan McKowen Memorial Trophy.

== Winners of the Joan McKowen Memorial Trophy ==
- 1994 New South Wales
- 1995 New South Wales
- 1996 New South Wales
- 1997 New South Wales
- 1998 New South Wales
- 1999 Victoria
- 2000 New South Wales
- 2001 Victoria
- 2002 New South Wales
- 2003 South Australia
- 2004 Australian Capital Territory
- 2005 South Australia
- 2006 South Australia
- 2007 New South Wales
- 2008 New South Wales
- 2009 New South Wales
- 2010 New South Wales
- 2011 Melbourne Ice
- 2012 Adelaide Adrenaline
- 2013 Melbourne Ice
- 2014 Melbourne Ice
- 2015 Melbourne Ice
- 2016 Melbourne Ice
- 2017 Sydney Sirens
- 2018 Melbourne Ice
- 2019 Melbourne Ice
- 2020 Sydney Sirens
- 2026 Perth Inferno

== See also ==
- Joan McKowen Memorial Trophy - Images - de Groot Photography
- Ice Hockey Australia
- Australian Women's Ice Hockey League
- Australian Ice Hockey League
- Australian Junior Ice Hockey League
- Jim Brown Trophy
- Goodall Cup
