= Ice Arena (Adelaide) =

Public ice rink in Adelaide, South Australia

IceArenA

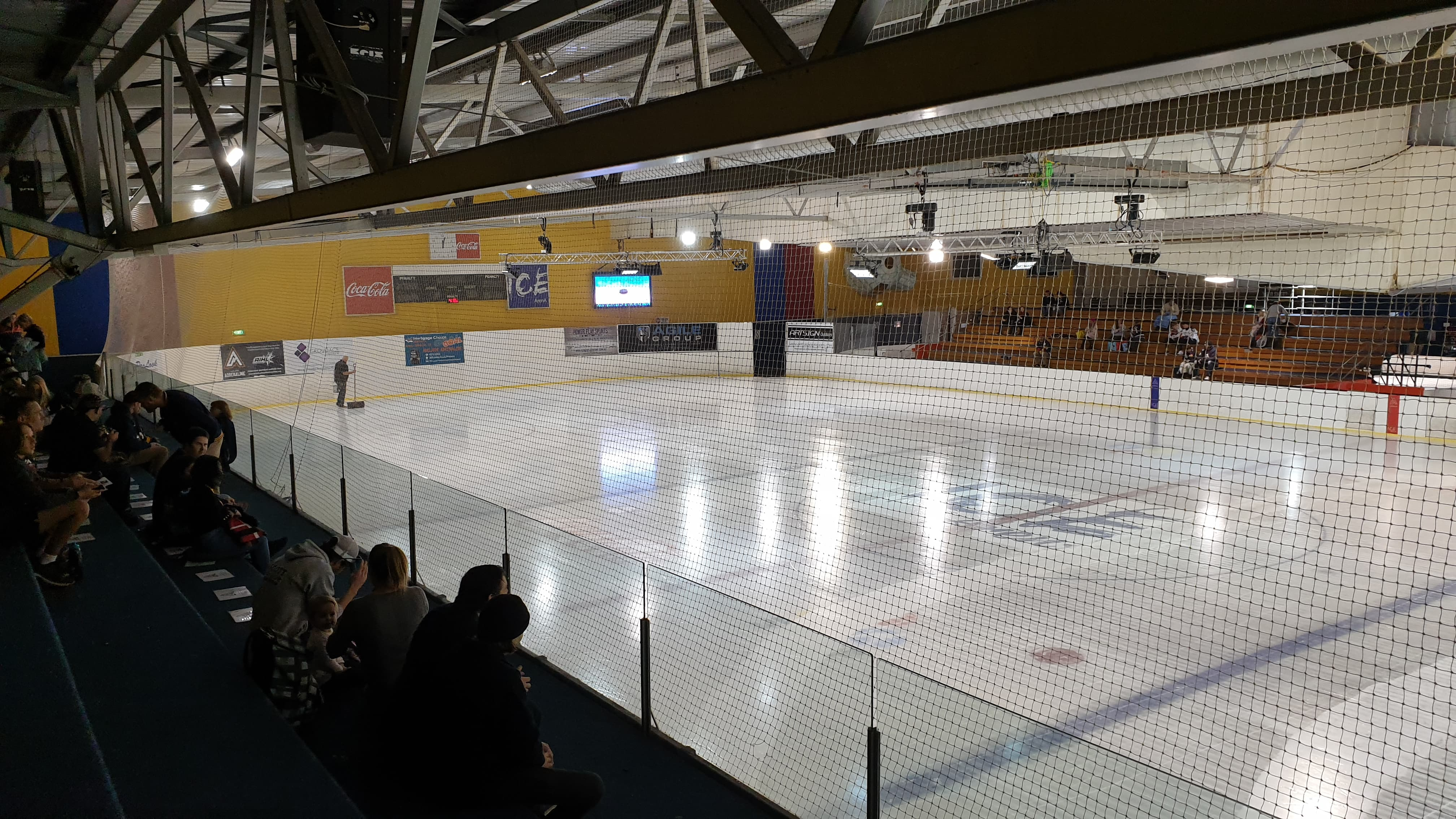
- Interactive map of IceArenA
- Former names: Ice Arena; Mt Thebarton Snow and Ice; Snowdome Adelaide
- Location: Thebarton, South Australia
- Coordinates: 34°55′11″S 138°34′41″E
- Operator: SAISF
- Capacity: 2,000
- Surface: 56 metres × 26 metres (Second rink 30m x 15m)
- Scoreboard: LED

Construction
- Groundbreaking: 1980
- Built: 1980-1981
- Opened: 17 September 1981 (44 years ago)
- Renovated: 1987 (Mt Thebarton)

Tenants
- Ice Factor Foundation Inc (lessee from April 2020). Adelaide Adrenaline (AIHL) (2008–present); Adelaide Rush (AWIHL) (2006–present); Adelaide Avalanche (AIHL) (2000-2008)

Website
- theicearena.com.au

The Ice Arena (stylised as IceArenA), formerly Snowdome and Mt Thebarton Snow and Ice, is an ice sports and public skate centre, located in Thebarton, Adelaide, South Australia. The centre is the home of the Ice Factor Foundation Inc and the ice sports associations (SAISA, IHSA, and BASA), and their respective clubs, including Adelaide Adrenaline (AIHL), Adelaide Rush (AWIHL), and Adelaide Generals (AJIHL).

== History ==
The centre first opened in 1981 as the Ice Arena with a full size skating rink surrounded by a speed skating track.

In late 1987, the centre closed for the construction of the world's first indoor ski slope and reopened in 1988 as Mt Thebarton Snow and Ice, featuring what was reported to be the world's first indoor ski slope on artificial snow. To accommodate the new structure supporting the ski slope and to make room for the bottom of the slope, the concentric skating rink concept was abandoned and replaced by two ice skating rinks, one large 56×26m rink and one smaller 30×15m surface. The centre underwent a name change to Snowdome Adelaide.

The facility temporarily closed in June 2005 due to the running costs of the centre, but it re-opened minus the indoor ski slope with the new name of IceArenA.

In March 2016, the large ice was closed due to issues with the pipe works under the large ice. Media release stated that Ice Arena were in discussions with the government. In May 2016, the large ice reopened, with various dignitaries in attendance, after a government grant was provided to purchase a new, modern refrigeration plant.

In September 2021, the Ice Arena helped launch the National Hockey Super League (NHSL), Australia's first professional ice hockey league.

The arena reopened in November 2023 after a change of management.

== Events ==
The venue offers a wide variety of activities including ice hockey lessons, ice skating lessons, snow play sessions, school holiday skating, birthday parties, public skating sessions.

== See also ==
- List of ice rinks in Australia
- Sport in South Australia
