= Canterbury Olympic Ice Rink =

Public ice rink in New South Wales, Australia

Coordinates: 33°54′35″S 151°6′48″E

- Interactive map of Canterbury Olympic Ice Rink
- Location: Canterbury, New South Wales

Canterbury Olympic Ice Rink is an ice sports and public ice skating centre, located in the Sydney suburb of Canterbury, New South Wales.

== Facilities ==
The venue first opened to patrons on 5 March 1917. Throughout its history it has hosted numerous ice related activities including ice skating lessons, birthday parties, figure skating, speed skating, synchronised skating, public skating sessions and ice hockey games. It was also the home venue of the Sydney Figure Skating Club, Sydney Arrows speed skating club, Canterbury Ice Hockey Club and the East Coast Super League, Sydney's elite ice hockey tournament.

In August 2022, Canterbury Olympic Ice Rink was shut down after structural engineers found the roof at risk of collapse.

== Rebuild ==
As part of its WestInvest program, the NSW Government has granted $17.7 million for an upgrade to the ice rink that began planning in late 2024 with the facility expected to re-open in 2026. The existing facility was demolished and rebuilt starting in 2025 and includes a new roof with solar panels, significant upgrades to change room facilities, a new Olympic-sized ice rink, spectator seating and skating equipment storage.

== See also ==
- List of ice rinks in Australia
- Australian Women's Ice Hockey League
