= 2022 AIHL season =

- League: Australian Ice Hockey League
- Sport: Ice hockey
- Duration: 30 April 2022 – 4 September 2022

Regular season
- H Newman Reid Trophy: CBR Brave (3rd title)
- Season MVP: Casey Kubara (CBR Brave)
- Top scorer: Casey Kubara (52 points) (CBR Brave)

Goodall Cup
- Champions: CBR Brave (2nd title)
- Runners-up: Newcastle Northstars
- Finals MVP: Joey Hughes (CBR Brave)

AIHL seasons
- 2021 2023

The 2022 AIHL season is the delayed 21st season of the Australian Ice Hockey League (AIHL), following the cancellation of the 2020 and 2021 seasons. The season will consist of 60 regular season games and is scheduled to run from 30 April to 28 August 2022, with the Goodall Cup finals, consisting of 2 semi-finals, a preliminary final and a grand final, following the regular season on 2–4 September 2022. The CBR Brave won the double and claimed the H Newman Reid Trophy for a third time and Goodall Cup for a second time in 2022 by finishing top of the regular season standings and winning the AIHL grand final. The Newcastle Northstars were runner's up to both titles and the Sydney Ice Dogs claimed the wooden spoon.

== Teams ==
In 2022 the AIHL had planned for 8 teams to be competing in the league when the season was announced. However, the Perth Thunder had to withdraw due to ongoing Western Australia border restriction challenges. Adelaide Adrenaline followed the Thunder in withdrawing from the 2022 season following failed protracted negotiations with the ice rink in Adelaide, leaving the team homeless in 2022. This left the league with six teams competing in the regular season in 2022. Two expansion teams, plus the Thunder, announced they would play exhibition games in 2022.

2022 AIHL teams
Team	City	Arena	Head Coach	Captain
CBR Brave	(Australian Capital Territory) Canberra	Phillip Ice Skating Centre	(Australia) Stuart Philps	(Australia) Kai Miettinen
Melbourne Ice	(Victoria (state)) Melbourne	O'Brien Icehouse	(Australia) Sandy Gardner	(Australia) Austin McKenzie
Melbourne Mustangs	(Victoria (state)) Melbourne	O'Brien Icehouse	(Canada) Chris Lawrence	(Australia) Brendan McDowell
Newcastle Northstars	(New South Wales) Newcastle	Hunter Ice Skating Stadium	(Canada) Kevin Noble	(Australia) Liam Manwarring
Sydney Bears	(New South Wales) Sydney	Macquarie Ice Rink	(Australia) Ron Kuprowsky	(Australia) Brian Funes
Sydney Ice Dogs	(New South Wales) Sydney	Macquarie Ice Rink	(Czech Republic) Ondrej Cervenka	(Australia) Daniel Pataky
Withdrawn teams
Adelaide Adrenaline	(South Australia) Adelaide	No home venue	N/A	N/A
Perth Thunder	(Western Australia) Perth	Perth Ice Arena	N/A	N/A
Exhibition teams
Brisbane Lightning	(Queensland) Brisbane	Boondall Iceworld	(Australia) Terry Kiliwnik	(Australia) Damian Bright
Central Coast Rhinos	(New South Wales) Erina	Erina Ice Arena	(Australia) Ashley March	(Australia) Robert Malloy
Perth Thunder	(Western Australia) Perth	Perth Ice Arena	(Canada) Ben Breault	(Canada) Ben Breault

== League business ==
The AIHL made the announcement that the league would return for a regular season and finals for 2022 on 6 December 2021, ending two years of cancelled competition and exhibition series'. The 2022 fixture list and finals schedule was released publicly by the AIHL on 8 February 2022. Melbourne would return as the host city of the AIHL Finals in 2022, after Newcastle hosted the 2019 edition. The League champion will be awarded the Goodall Cup, while the League Premiers will be awarded the H Newman Reid Trophy title. On 8 April 2022, the AIHL released a revised season schedule that did not change any dates but replaced Adrenaline and Thunder regular season fixtures with exhibition games involving the Rhinos, Lightning and Thunder.

The league made a number of key announcements in February in the lead up to the 2022 season start. Firstly, the AIHL would implement a game day format change it first flagged in 2020, which would bring the AIHL into line with international hockey standards. Game lengths would be increased from 50 minutes to 60 minutes with all three period lengths standardised to 20 minutes each. Previously the first two periods in the AIHL would be 15 minutes long with only the third period lasting 20 minutes. Secondly, the AIHL announced the expansion of domestic and international broadcasting of the league. Within Australia, more matches would be made available through partner broadcaster Kayo Sports, expanding on previous deals that included one game a round on delay. AIHL.TV would also provide an alternative platform for streaming content from the league. Internationally, the AIHL secured a deal with US-based Synergy Sports to deliver live streaming of AIHL games to the US, Canadian, United Kingdom and European markets. Thirdly, the AIHL will be setting up a new national community partnership to help showcase elite hockey in Australia. Lastly, the AIHL concluded the expression of interest process to find a new Licensee for the Adelaide Adrenaline license, following former holders, the South Australian Ice Sports Federation, relinquishing the license at the conclusion of the 2019 season. The League began the search in October 2021 and concluded five months later in February 2022 by announcing Benny Gebert and Glen Foll as the successful bidders for the license.

In March, the AIHL announced it had signed a three-year deal with Swiss-based Sportradar to become the league's global distributor of game streams and media rights. This superseded the previous announcement with Synergy Sports as Synergy was acquired by Sportradar in March 2022. As part of the deal, Sportradar would also supply AIHL teams with video and data analytical services. In addition, the league released details of a new finals format for 2022. The finals format would be expanded from two to three days with the semi-finals now formatted into major (1v2) and minor (3v4) games and an additional game, the preliminary final, would be added to the schedule on the middle day. The winner of the major semi-final automatically advances to the grand final, while the losing team plays-off against the winner of the minor semi-final in the preliminary final. It means the teams finishing third and fourth in the regular season will be required to play at least two games to reach the grand final and compete for the Goodall Cup.

Expanding on the league's earlier announcement from February, in late April 2022, the AIHL revealed further details around the Kayo Sports domestic broadcasting deal for the 2022 season. Every game of the AIHL regular season, all 60, would be streamed live, free and exclusive on Kayo Sports. This would be the first time the league would broadcast every game of the season. In July 2022, the AIHL and Ice Hockey Australia jointly founded a new Best and Fairest Award for all Australian national championships starting in 2022 including, Sydney Tange, Kurt Defris, Phillip Ginsberg, Jim Brown and Women's championships.

In June, the AIHL entered into a new partnership with Workplace Law. The agreement with the specialised law firm, would deliver the AIHL a partner for legal advice and support across governance and constitutional matters, employment issues, tribunal/disciplinary matters, sponsorship and broadcast arrangements and competition matters.

=== Interruptions ===
When the 2022 season was announced by the AIHL, it was indicated that all eight current AIHL teams would participate. The AIHL in February 2022 released the regular season schedule and it contained fixtures for all eight teams, home and away. In response to the schedule, the Perth Thunder released a public statement on 12 February 2022, confirming the current Western Australian border restrictions presented challenges for the team to participate in the 2022 season, but the team would continue to dialog with stakeholders and hope for a resolution from the state government. On 18 February 2022, the Thunder in conjunction with the AIHL announced the team would not participate in the 2022 AIHL season due to uncertainty of when the WA border would open again and the limited time left to organise the team and travel prior to the 2022 season kicking off. The Thunder did offer the possibility of exhibition matches being played in Perth in 2022 to compensate for the unfortunate situation for its players, staff, fans and sponsors.

Adelaide Adrenaline's participation in the 2022 AIHL season has been caste in doubt with negotiations with Adelaide IceArenA, the only ice rink facility in Adelaide, breaking down. On 15 February 2022, IceArenA management released a signed letter with a list of accusations and grievances against the AIHL and ended the letter stating it would be difficult for the arena to support the AIHL. The Adrenaline deemed the subsequent draft agreement proposed by the IceArenA management for use of the facility for the 2022 AIHL season as non-equitable and unviable. On 27 March 2022, the Adrenaline officially withdrew from the 2022 AIHL season.

On 26 February 2022, the CBR Brave responded to an unconfirmed claim that they were looking to leave the AIHL, by confirming their status as an AIHL team and committing to the league and the 2022 season. Brave CEO, Sunny Singh, said the league had taken profound action in addressing key issues the Brave had heading into the 2022 season.

Two regular season games set to be played in Melbourne between the CBR Brave and Melbourne Mustangs were first postponed and later cancelled in July 2022. The games, scheduled for 2 and 3 July 2022, were postponed after flight cancellations at Canberra Airport left the CBR Brave stranded in Canberra and unable to fly to Melbourne for the double header against the Mustangs. Despite efforts to rebook both the Saturday and Sunday games were postponed on the Saturday. Both teams tried to reschedule the two games but ultimately were unsuccessful. On 30 July 2022 it was revealed the game were cancelled and both teams would share the six points on offer, three points each. The League confirmed the games were officially cancelled on 3 August 2022.

=== Expansion ===
Two teams decided against pursuing AIHL licenses in 2022. The Melbourne Ducks played exhibition matches against AIHL teams in 2021 but decided to join the new Pacific Hockey League in 2022. Joining the Ducks in the Pacific Hockey League is the Brisbane Rampage, who abandoned their strategic goal of obtaining an AIHL license in favour of joining the rival league. Ice Hockey Queensland (IHQ) subsequently decided to withdraw their endorsement of the Rampage and seek an AIHL license themselves in partnership with Brisbane Buccaneers and the Southern Stars. On 28 February 2022, IHQ was granted an AIHL license by the league commission. IHQ revealed their new AIHL team would play out of Boondall Iceworld and be called Brisbane Lightning. On 7 March 2022, it was reveled former AIHL team, Central Coast Rhinos, had made contact with the AIHL to obtain a new license and present their case for re-admission to the league. The Rhinos last played in the AIHL in 2008 before a licensing disagreement saw the team leave the league. They applied for re-entry in 2015, but were unsuccessful in their application on that occasion. On 10 March 2022, the AIHL made the decision to grant the Rhinos a new AIHL license, ending the team's 14-year hiatus out of the league. Central Coast will play out of their spiritual home, Erina Ice Arena, which went through major renovations and upgrades between 2019 and 2022. Both the Lightning and Rhinos will play exhibition matches in 2022 with a view for both to join the AIHL regular league schedule in 2023.

=== Exhibition games ===
The Brisbane Lightning, Central Coast Rhinos and Perth Thunder all announced in pre-season that they wanted to play exhibition games during the AIHL 2022 regular season. In total 29 exhibition games were scheduled in 2022, consisting of pre-season warm-ups, games with new teams and games with the Thunder during the regular season. Most games were announced with the release of the revised AIHL 2022 season schedule on 8 April 2022, however, the first exhibition series between the Sydney Bears and Newcastle Northstars was made public on 17 March 2022 and consisted of two pre-season match ups at Hunter Ice Skating Stadium in Newcastle and Macquarie Ice Rink in North Sydney. The team breakup of exhibition games for 2022 see the Lightning scheduled for 16 games, Bears 9 games, Rhinos 8 games, Northstars 6 games, Thunder, Mustangs and Ice Dogs 4 games, Ice 3 games and Brave 2 games. On 24 July 2022, the exhibition game between the Brisbane Lightning and Sydney Bears held as Iceworld Boondall in Brisbane was abandoned near the end of the second period follow an ugly high sticking incident. Subsequently, the AIHL Player Safety Committee concluded its investigation into the incident that led to the abandoned game and made the following ruling. The Brisbane Lightning player involved was suspended for 2+5 AIHL games (7 in total) and suspended from all Ice Hockey Australia national events until the suspension is completed in 2023. The Sydney Bears organisation was fined $3,500 for intentionally forfeiting the game.

Exhibition fixtures and results
Date	Time	Away	Score	Home	Location	Recap
9 APR	17:30	Sydney Bears	6–7	Newcastle Northstars	Hunter Ice Skating Stadium	Ref
23 APR	16:30	Newcastle Northstars	4–1	Sydney Bears	Macquarie Ice Rink	Ref
23 APR	17:00	Melbourne Mustangs	1–6	Brisbane Lightning	Iceworld Boondall	Ref
24 APR	19:30	Sydney Bears	5–3	Central Coast Rhinos	Erina Ice Arena	Ref
1 MAY	15:30	Sydney Ice Dogs	5–4 (SO)	Central Coast Rhinos	Erina Ice Arena	Ref
14 MAY	17:00	Sydney Ice Dogs	1–4	Brisbane Lightning	Iceworld Boondall	Ref
15 MAY	17:00	Central Coast Rhinos	11–14	Sydney Bears	Macquarie Ice Rink	Ref
28 MAY	17:00	Brisbane Lightning	4–5 (OT)	Melbourne Mustangs	O’Brien Icehouse	Ref
29 MAY	14:00	Brisbane Lightning	5–7	Melbourne Mustangs	O’Brien Icehouse	Ref
4 JUN	15:30	Brisbane Lightning	8–4	Central Coast Rhinos	Erina Ice Arena	Ref
5 JUN	16:00	Brisbane Lightning	5–7	Newcastle Northstars	Hunter Ice Skating Stadium	Ref
25 JUN	17:00	Newcastle Northstars	5–4	Brisbane Lightning	Iceworld Boondall	Ref
26 JUN	16:30	Newcastle Northstars	7–5	Brisbane Lightning	Iceworld Boondall	Ref
9 JUL	–	Melbourne Mustangs	Cancelled	Perth Thunder	Perth Ice Arena	–
10 JUL	–	Melbourne Mustangs	Cancelled	Perth Thunder	Perth Ice Arena	–
16 JUL	16:30	Brisbane Lightning	7–0	Sydney Ice Dogs	Macquarie Ice Rink	Ref
17 JUL	16:30	Brisbane Lightning	2–7	Sydney Bears	Macquarie Ice Rink	Ref
23 JUL	17:00	Sydney Bears	3–7	Brisbane Lightning	Iceworld Boondall	Ref
24 JUL	15:30	Sydney Bears	1–6	Brisbane Lightning	Iceworld Boondall	Ref
30 JUL	16:30	Brisbane Lightning	3–4 (OT)	Sydney Bears	Macquarie Ice Rink	Ref
30 JUL	17:00	Perth Thunder	1–6	Melbourne Mustangs	O’Brien Icehouse	Ref
31 JUL	14:00	Perth Thunder	5–3	Melbourne Ice	O’Brien Icehouse	Ref
31 JUL	17:00	Central Coast Rhinos	8–4	Sydney Ice Dogs	Macquarie Ice Rink	Ref
7 AUG	15:30	Central Coast Rhinos	2–12	CBR Brave	Phillip Ice Skating Centre	Ref
13 AUG	15:30	Brisbane Lightning	12–9	Central Coast Rhinos	Erina Ice Arena	Ref
13 AUG	18:30	Melbourne Ice	1–8	Perth Thunder	Perth Ice Arena	Ref
14 AUG	18:30	Melbourne Ice	1–3	Perth Thunder	Perth Ice Arena	Ref
14 AUG	16:00	Brisbane Lightning	3–4	Newcastle Northstars	Hunter Ice Skating Stadium	Ref
27 AUG	–	CBR Brave	Cancelled	Brisbane Lightning	Iceworld Boondall	–
28 AUG	–	Central Coast Rhinos	Cancelled	Sydney Bears	Macquarie Ice Rink	–

=== Personnel changes ===
On 12 February 2022, the AIHL announced its new board of directors and key executives for 2022. The board comprises Garry Doré, Peter Jon Hartshorne, Wayne Hellyer and Joyce Price, with Hartshorne acting as chairman. Christine Bertolotti was appointed head of finance, Dawn Watt head of operations and Rob Duchemin head of referees & discipline.

There has been a number of franchise personal changes in addition to the league itself for 2022. These include a new executive team being appointed in February 2022 at the Sydney Bears. Nathan Graham became president and will be assisted by Andrew Bourne, Ruby Bray and Hamish Davey as vice presidents. Vanessa Saros takes over duties as Bears secretary. In March 2022, Adelaide Adrenaline appointed Glen Foll as new director of hockey operations and Benny Gebert as director of club operations, after the duo secured the operating license for the Adrenaline franchise from the AIHL.

There have also been a number of coaching changes for AIHL teams in 2022. The Sydney Ice Dogs lost Andrew Petrie, after he resigned in November 2021. He was replaced as head coach by former Czech player Ondrej Cervenka in March 2022. Adelaide Adrenaline and head coach Sami Mantere parted ways following the cancellation of the 2020 season. Mantere chose to sign for Adelaide Avalanche in March 2022 for the inaugural season of the Pacific Hockey League. Also in March, the newly formed Brisbane Lightning announced Terry Kiliwnik as their maiden head coach and Ivan Rapchuk as his assistant. In April, the Melbourne Mustangs appointed Canadian Chris Lawrence as head coach for 2022. This will be Lawrence's first head coach position as he comes off a long playing career in the AHL, ECHL and EIHL. The Melbourne Ice turned to a familiar long term servant of the club with their appointment of Sandy Gardner as head coach for 2022. This will be Gardner's third stint as head coach of the Melbournian club. He would be joined by fellow long term clubman Brent Laver as his assistant coach alongside newcomer Michael Flaherty, who joined the club with a CV including head coaching the Mustangs, Glaciers and Victoria. Canberra announced Stuart Philps would be retained as head coach for 2022, following his signing in the lead up to the cancelled 2020 season. Philps would be assisted by the returning Andrew Brunt, who had last coached the ACT team in the Brown Trophy in 2017 and had been the Brave assistant in 2015. Early in the season, Newcastle Northstars changed coaching staff responsibilities with Canadian Kevin Noble shifted to head coach and John Kennedy moved to assistant coach alongside Amelia Matheson.

=== Player transfers ===
==== Interclub transfers ====
Nat	Player	Previous team	New team	Ref
(Australia)	Matt Armstrong	Melbourne Ice	Melbourne Mustangs	
(Australia)	Zachary Boyle	Adelaide Adrenaline	Melbourne Ice	
(Australia)	Damian Bright	Melbourne Mustangs	Brisbane Lightning	
(Australia)	Ellesse Carini	Sydney Ice Dogs	Sydney Bears	
(Australia)	Jakob Doornbos	CBR Brave	Sydney Ice Dogs	
(Australia)	James Downie	Melbourne Ice	Newcastle Northstars	
(Australia)	Andrew Erzen	Melbourne Mustangs	Melbourne Ice	
(Australia)	Ryan Foll	Adelaide Adrenaline	Melbourne Ice	
(Australia)	Glen Forbes-White	Adelaide Adrenaline	Sydney Bears	
(Canada)	Alexandre Gauthier	Adelaide Adrenaline	Sydney Bears	
(Australia)	Robert Haselhurst	Perth Thunder	Sydney Bears	
(Australia)	Thomas Kiliwnik	Newcastle Northstars	Brisbane Lightning	
(Australia)	Tomas Landa*	Newcastle Northstars	Sydney Bears	
(Australia)	Lyndon Lodge	Perth Thunder	CBR Brave	
(Australia)	Alastair Punler	Perth Thunder	CBR Brave	
(Australia)	Aleksi Toivonen	Melbourne Mustangs	CBR Brave	
(Slovakia)	Frantisek Vlasek*	Newcastle Northstars	Sydney Ice Dogs	
(Australia)	Tom Voller	Melbourne Mustangs	Sydney Ice Dogs	
(Australia)	Sebastian Woodlands	Adelaide Adrenaline	Melbourne Mustangs	
(Australia)	Jamie Woodman	Perth Thunder	CBR Brave	

* Mid-season transfer.

==== Retirements ====
Nat	Player	Team	New role	Ref
(Australia)	Tomas Manco	Sydney Ice Dogs	—	
(Australia)	Michael Schlamp	Sydney Bears	—	
(Australia)	Lachlan Seary	CBR Brave	—	

==== New signings ====
Nat	Player	Previous team	New team	Ref
(Russia)	Maxim Astafyev	Metallurg Novokuznetsk U18	Melbourne Mustangs	
(Australia)	Ignacy Benjamin	No team	Sydney Bears	
(Canada)	Daniel Berno	Brampton Admirals	Newcastle Northstars	
(Australia)	Declan Bronte	Connecticut Chiefs	CBR Brave	
(Australia)	Lachlan Cincotta	Melbourne Glaciers	Melbourne Ice	
(United States)	Garret Cockerill	Reading Royals	CBR Brave	
(Canada)	Brendan Connors	Blackhawks Ice Hockey Club	Melbourne Mustangs	
(New Zealand)	Greg Davis	West Auckland Admirals	Melbourne Ice	
(Australia)	Charlie Davis-Tope	No team	Melbourne Ice	
(Australia)	Luka Dimopoulos	Stealth Bombers	Sydney Ice Dogs	
(Australia)	Connor Dowell	No team	Sydney Ice Dogs	
(Australia)	Ryan Duchemin	No team	Newcastle Northstars	
(Russia)	Alexander Dvinyaninov	Yunost Yekaterinburg U16	Sydney Ice Dogs	
(Australia)	Hunter Ellen	Newcastle North Stars (ECSL)	Newcastle Northstars	
(Australia)	Mackenzie Gallagher	Newcastle North Stars (ECSL)	Newcastle Northstars	
(Australia)	Jacob Haley	Melbourne Glaciers	Melbourne Mustangs	
(Australia)	Robert Haselhurst	Flyers Ice Hockey Club	Sydney Bears	
(Australia)	Ethan Hawes	Willmar WarHawks	Newcastle Northstars	
(Australia)	Wylie Hodder	No team	CBR Brave	
(Australia)	Bobby Huang	Melbourne Glaciers	Melbourne Ice	
(Australia)	Cameron Hughes	No team	Newcastle Northstars	
(Australia)	Michael James	Melbourne Jets	Melbourne Ice	
(Australia)	David Jeremy	Newcastle North Stars (ECSL)	Newcastle Northstars	
(Australia)	Liam Jones	No team	Sydney Ice Dogs	
(Australia)	Eugene Ju	Sydney Sting	Sydney Ice Dogs	
(Australia)	Evan Khroustalev	No team	Melbourne Mustangs	
(Australia)	Joshua Kleipas	Stealth Bombers	Sydney Ice Dogs	
(Australia)	Matthew Knox	Melbourne Glaciers	Melbourne Mustangs	
(Australia)	Toby Kubara	No team	CBR Brave	
(Australia)	Jason Kvisle	Reach Rebels	Sydney Ice Dogs	
(Australia)	Sai Lake	No team	Melbourne Ice	
(Australia)	Travis Lang	No team	Newcastle Northstars	
(Australia)	Jacob Laver	Red Deer Elks U18	Melbourne Ice	
(Australia)	Daniel Machin	No team	Melbourne Ice	
(Australia)	Bryan Mackenzie	No team	Melbourne Ice	
(United States)	Matt Marasco	No team	CBR Brave	
(Australia)	Blake Martucci	No team	Melbourne Mustangs	
(Australia)	Alex May	Melbourne Glaciers	Melbourne Mustangs	
(Australia)	Timothy McGrath	No team	Sydney Ice Dogs	
(Italy)	Brandon McNally	Cardiff Devils	CBR Brave	
(Australia)	Max Miller	Sydney Sabres	Sydney Ice Dogs	
(Australia)	Dylan Morris	Saints Monarchs Ice Hockey Club	Melbourne Mustangs	
(Australia)	Nicholas Munro	No team	Melbourne Ice	
(Australia)	Spencer Nave	No team	Melbourne Mustangs	
(Australia)	Matt Nikitin	No team	Melbourne Ice	
(Australia)	Tim Nikitin	Melbourne Glaciers	Melbourne Ice	
(Australia)	Sean Oultram	No team	Newcastle Northstars	
(Australia)	Kevin Peng	No team	Melbourne Ice	
(Canada)	Michael Poirier	Dundee Stars	Sydney Bears	
(Australia)	Cooper Porter	No team	Melbourne Ice	
(Australia)	Alexander Rose	No team	Melbourne Mustangs	
(Australia)	Fredrik Rozenberg	Sydney Wolf Pack	Sydney Ice Dogs	
(Australia)	Marcus Rozenberg	Brisbane Blitz	Sydney Ice Dogs	
(Australia)	David Shumborski	No team	Melbourne Mustangs	
(Australia)	Connor Sidari-Alley	No team	Melbourne Mustangs	
(Australia)	Beau Taylor	Daysland Northstars	Newcastle Northstars	
(Australia)	Jesse Thompson	No team	Melbourne Mustangs	
(Canada)	Scott Timmins	Eispiraten Crimmitschau	Melbourne Mustangs	
(Australia)	Riley Tonks	Hässelby Kälvesta	Newcastle Northstars	
(Czech Republic)	Lukas Vaic	Sydney Sting	Sydney Ice Dogs	
(Canada)	Mario Valery-Trabucco	Hannover Scorpions	CBR Brave	
(Australia)	Joshua Van Douwen	Melbourne Glaciers	Melbourne Ice	
(Slovakia)	Franki Vlasek	No team	Newcastle Northstars	
(Australia)	Josh Walt	No team	Melbourne Ice	
(Australia)	Jordan Warren	No team	Melbourne Mustangs	
(Canada)	Ty Wishart	Eispiraten Crimmitschau	Melbourne Mustangs	
(Australia)	Charlie York	No team	CBR Brave	
(Australia)	Henry York	No team	CBR Brave	

==== Players lost ====
Nat	Player	Previous team	New team	Ref
(Sweden)	Henrik Ahlin	Sydney Ice Dogs	No team	
(Australia)	Harley Anderson	Adelaide Adrenaline	Brisbane Rampage	
(Australia)	Matthew Anderson	Melbourne Mustangs	Melbourne Ducks	
(Sweden)	Sebastian Andersson	Melbourne Ice	Hammarby Hockey	
(New Zealand)	Bradley Apps	Melbourne Mustangs	Canterbury Red Devils	
(Australia)	Spencer Austin	CBR Brave	No team	
(Australia)	Jason Baclig	Melbourne Ice	No team	
(Canada)	Sammy Banga	Newcastle Northstars	No team	
(United States)	Garrett Bartus	Sydney Ice Dogs	No team	
(Australia)	Nathaniel Benson	Adelaide Adrenaline	Adelaide Avalanche	
(Australia)	Steve Best	Adelaide Adrenaline	Adelaide Avalanche	
(Australia)	Connor Bolger	Sydney Ice Dogs	Sydney Sabres	
(Australia)	Jamie Bourke	Melbourne Mustangs	Melbourne Ducks	
(Australia)	Jonathon Bremner	Melbourne Ice	No team	
(Australia)	Jake Burgess	Sydney Ice Dogs	No team	
(Australia)	Jack Carpenter	Melbourne Ice	Melbourne Ducks	
(New Zealand)	Jeremy Chai	Melbourne Ice	West Auckland Admirals	
(Australia)	Jayson Chalker	Newcastle Northstars	No team	
(Australia)	Andrew Chen	Adelaide Adrenaline	Adelaide Avalanche	
(Canada)	Matt Climie	CBR Brave	Bratislava Capitals	
(Australia)	Kale Costa	Sydney Ice Dogs	HC Dynamo Pardubice	
(United Kingdom)	Paul Crowder	Sydney Ice Dogs	Fife Flyers	
(United Kingdom)	Tim Crowder	Sydney Ice Dogs	Fife Flyers	
(New Zealand)	Tristan Darling	Melbourne Mustangs	Dunedin Thunder	
(Slovakia)	Adam Dauda	Sydney Bears	Kalamazoo Wings	
(Australia)	Dayne Davis	Newcastle Northstars	Melbourne Ducks	
(Australia)	Hayden Dawes	CBR Brave	Lindenwood Lions	
(Canada)	Jordan Draper	CBR Brave	Hamburg Crocodiles	
(Canada)	Francis Drolet	Newcastle Northstars	Gothiques d'Amiens	
(Australia)	Nickolas Eckhardt	CBR Brave	No team	
(Australia)	Lachlan Fahmy	Sydney Ice Dogs	Northern Cyclones	
(Australia)	David Ferrari	Newcastle Northstars	No team	
(Canada)	Thomas Flack	Melbourne Mustangs	Saint Michael's Purple Knights	
(Australia)	Darcy Flanagan	Melbourne Ice	Oklahoma City Jr. Blazers	
(Australia)	Jeremy Friederich	Adelaide Adrenaline	Adelaide Avalanche	
(Slovakia)	Dominik Gabaj	Newcastle Northstars	Brest Albatros	
(Canada)	Jesse Gabrielle	CBR Brave	HK Nitra	
(Australia)	Todd Graham	Melbourne Ice	No team	
(Switzerland)	Kyllian Guyenet	Sydney Bears	Skautafélag Reykjavíkur	
(New Zealand)	Matt Harvey	CBR Brave	No team	
(United States)	Christian Isackson	Melbourne Mustangs	No team	
(Canada)	Adam Kambeitz	CBR Brave	No team	
(Australia)	Jake Knott	Sydney Ice Dogs	Sydney Bombers	
(Czech Republic)	Ales Kratoska	Adelaide Adrenaline	Luja HT	
(Canada)	Kasey Kulczycki	Melbourne Ice	Birmingham Bulls	
(Australia)	Lee Lambert	Melbourne Mustangs	No team	
(Canada)	Maxime Langelier-Parent	Melbourne Mustangs	No team	
(Australia)	Dylan Lavery	Sydney Ice Dogs	Sydney Wolf Pack	
(Australia)	Jayden Lewis	CBR Brave	No team	
(Australia)	Mathew Lindsay	Newcastle Northstars	No team	
(Canada)	Brayden Low	CBR Brave	Reading Royals	
(Australia)	Taylor Luck	Melbourne Ice	Melbourne Glaciers	
(Sweden)	Jacob Lundgren	Melbourne Ice	IF Mölndal Hockey	
(Canada)	Joey MacDougall	Adelaide Adrenaline	Adelaide Avalanche	
(Australia)	James Marino	Sydney Ice Dogs	No team	
(Canada)	Tyler Mayea	CBR Brave	Birmingham Bulls	
(Australia)	Jackson McCoy	Melbourne Mustangs	No team	
(Australia)	Michael McMahon	Melbourne Mustangs	Melbourne Ducks	
(Australia)	Cooper Metcalf	Melbourne Mustangs	Melbourne Ducks	
(Australia)	Matt Monaghan	Sydney Ice Dogs	No team	
(United States)	Chris Moquin	Sydney Bears	Åmåls SK	
(Australia)	Thomas Munro	Melbourne Ice	The Coast	
(Canada)	Kevin Nastiuk	Melbourne Mustangs	Stony Plain Eagles	
(Canada)	Kyle Neuber	Adelaide Adrenaline	Florida Everblades	
(Australia)	Nicholas Novysedlak	Sydney Ice Dogs	Brisbane Rampage	
(Australia)	Patrick O'Kane	Melbourne Mustangs	No team	
(Canada)	Jordan Owens	Melbourne Mustangs	Brantford Blast	
(Australia)	Christian Pansino	Melbourne Ice	Melbourne Glaciers	
(Australia)	Nathan Pedretti	Melbourne Ice	No team	
(Canada)	Trey Phillips	Newcastle Northstars	Rapid City Rush	
(Australia)	Jaden Pine-Murphy	Melbourne Mustangs	Brisbane Rampage	
(United States)	J.M. Piotrowski	Melbourne Ice	Birmingham Bulls	
(Australia)	Hamish Powell	Newcastle Northstars	No team	
(Australia)	Thomas Powell	Melbourne Ice	No team	
(Canada)	Dylan Quaile	Sydney Ice Dogs	Fife Flyers	
(Australia)	Jack Ransome	Sydney Ice Dogs	Sydney Wolf Pack	
(United States)	Conor Riley	CBR Brave	Adirondack Thunder	
(Australia)	Jake Riley	Adelaide Adrenaline	Adelaide Avalanche	
(Australia)	Troy Robertson	Melbourne Mustangs	Melbourne Ducks	
(Australia)	Mark Rummukainen	CBR Brave	No team	
(Australia)	Jayden Ryan	Newcastle Northstars	No team	
(Australia)	Alistair Rye	Newcastle Northstars	The Coast	
(Canada)	Jesse Schwartz	Melbourne Ice	No team	
(Canada)	Luke Simpson	Newcastle Northstars	Nanton Palominos	
(Czech Republic)	Ondrej Smach	Newcastle Northstars	HC Nove Zamky	
(Australia)	Charlie Smart	Newcastle Northstars	No team	
(United States)	Thomas Stahlhuth	Melbourne Ice	No team	
(Australia)	Corey Stringer	Adelaide Adrenaline	Melbourne Ducks	
(Australia)	Matt Stringer	Melbourne Mustangs	No team	
(Canada)	Parker Thomas	Melbourne Mustangs	Kenaston Blizzards	
(Australia)	Lee Turner	Sydney Ice Dogs	No team	
(Australia)	Gabriel Veyt	Melbourne Ice	Ottawa West Golden Knights	
(Finland)	Nico Vikstén	Perth Thunder	KeuPa HT	
(Australia)	Lliam Webster	Melbourne Ice	Melbourne Ducks	
(Australia)	Matt Wetini	Newcastle Northstars	No team	
(Switzerland)	Chris Williamson	CBR Brave	Nanton Palominos	
(Australia)	Chris Wong	Melbourne Ice	No team	

== Regular season ==
=== Results ===
Home \ Away	CB	MI	MM	NN	SB	SI	CB	MI	MM	NN	SB	SI
CBR Brave		9–1	9–4	9–3	7–8	9–5		7–3	6–4	8–2	11–4	8–1
Melbourne Ice	3–10		2–7	2–9	5–2	3–5	4–6		4–6	3–2	3–6	4–2
Melbourne Mustangs	–	4–0		1–3	4–7	6–4	–	3–4		4–7	3–4	12–2
Newcastle Northstars	1–6	8–2	7–4		7–1	5–4	3–2	9–3	6–3		7–4	8–4
Sydney Bears	5–4	4–0	4–9	5–8		12–2	1–9	7–2	2–3	4–3		10–3
Sydney Ice Dogs	1–14	6–1	6–3	2–8	2–3		3–7	4–5	6–9	3–6	1–12	

Updated to match(es) played on 1 April 2022. Source: AIHL
Legend: Blue = home team win; Yellow = draw; Red = away team win.

=== Fixtures ===
The 2022 regular season of 60 games, is scheduled to run from 30 April 2022 through to 28 August 2022, with each team playing 20 games. The top four teams qualify and advance to compete in the Goodall Cup finals weekend. The original schedule for 2022, consisting of 112 games had to be amended following the withdrawal of the Adrenaline and Thunder from the 2022 season, resulting in a reduction in the total number regular season games.

==== April ====
April fixtures
Date	Time	Away	Score	Home	Location	Recap
30 APR	17:00	CBR Brave	10–3	Melbourne Ice	O’Brien Icehouse	
30 APR	17:30	Melbourne Mustangs	4–7	Newcastle Northstars	Hunter Ice Skating Stadium	

==== May ====
May fixtures
Date	Time	Away	Score	Home	Location	Recap
1 MAY	14:00	CBR Brave	6–4	Melbourne Ice	O’Brien Icehouse	
1 MAY	16:30	Melbourne Mustangs	9–4	Sydney Bears	Macquarie Ice Rink	
7 MAY	17:00	Newcastle Northstars	3–1	Melbourne Mustangs	O’Brien Icehouse	
7 MAY	17:30	Sydney Ice Dogs	5–9	CBR Brave	Phillip Ice Skating Centre	
8 MAY	14:00	Newcastle Northstars	9–2	Melbourne Ice	O’Brien Icehouse	
8 MAY	16:30	CBR Brave	14–1	Sydney Ice Dogs	Macquarie Ice Rink	
14 MAY	17:30	Sydney Bears	1–7	Newcastle Northstars	Hunter Ice Skating Stadium	
14 MAY	17:30	Melbourne Ice	1–9	CBR Brave	Phillip Ice Skating Centre	
15 MAY	17:00	Melbourne Ice	3–7	CBR Brave	Phillip Ice Skating Centre	
20 MAY	19:30	Melbourne Mustangs	7–2	Melbourne Ice	O’Brien Icehouse	
21 MAY	16:30	Newcastle Northstars	8–2	Sydney Ice Dogs	Macquarie Ice Rink	
21 MAY	17:00	Sydney Bears	7–4	Melbourne Mustangs	O’Brien Icehouse	
22 MAY	14:00	Sydney Bears	2–5	Melbourne Ice	O’Brien Icehouse	
22 MAY	16:00	Sydney Ice Dogs	4–5	Newcastle Northstars	Hunter Ice Skating Stadium	
28 MAY	16:30	Melbourne Ice	0–4	Sydney Bears	Macquarie Ice Rink	
29 MAY	16:30	Melbourne Ice	1–6	Sydney Ice Dogs	Macquarie Ice Rink	
29 MAY	17:00	Sydney Bears	8–7 (SO)	CBR Brave	Phillip Ice Skating Centre	

==== June ====
June fixtures
Date	Time	Away	Score	Home	Location	Recap
3 JUN	19:30	Sydney Ice Dogs	2–12	Sydney Bears	Macquarie Ice Rink	
4 JUN	16:30	CBR Brave	7–3	Sydney Ice Dogs	Macquarie Ice Rink	
4 JUN	17:00	Melbourne Mustangs	6–4	Melbourne Ice	O’Brien Icehouse	
5 JUN	16:30	CBR Brave	4–5	Sydney Bears	Macquarie Ice Rink	
11 JUN	16:30	Melbourne Ice	5–4	Sydney Ice Dogs	Macquarie Ice Rink	
11 JUN	17:30	Melbourne Mustangs	3–6	Newcastle Northstars	Hunter Ice Skating Stadium	
11 JUN	17:30	Sydney Bears	4–11	CBR Brave	Phillip Ice Skating Centre	
12 JUN	15:30	Melbourne Ice	2–8	Newcastle Northstars	Hunter Ice Skating Stadium	
12 JUN	16:30	Melbourne Mustangs	3–6	Sydney Ice Dogs	Macquarie Ice Rink	
17 JUN	19:30	Melbourne Ice	0–4	Melbourne Mustangs	O’Brien Icehouse	
18 JUN	16:30	Sydney Bears	3–2	Sydney Ice Dogs	Macquarie Ice Rink	
18 JUN	16:30	CBR Brave	6–1	Newcastle Northstars	Hunter Ice Skating Stadium	
19 JUN	16:00	CBR Brave	2–3	Newcastle Northstars	Hunter Ice Skating Stadium	
25 JUN	17:00	Sydney Bears	6–3	Melbourne Ice	O’Brien Icehouse	
26 JUN	14:00	Sydney Bears	4–3	Melbourne Mustangs	O’Brien Icehouse	

==== July ====
July fixtures
Date	Time	Away	Score	Home	Location	Recap
2 JUL	16:30	Sydney Ice Dogs	3–10	Sydney Bears	Macquarie Ice Rink	
2 JUL	17:00	CBR Brave	Cancelled	Melbourne Mustangs	O’Brien Icehouse	
2 JUL	17:30	Melbourne Ice	3–9	Newcastle Northstars	Hunter Ice Skating Stadium	
3 JUL	14:00	CBR Brave	Cancelled	Melbourne Mustangs	O’Brien Icehouse	
3 JUL	16:30	Melbourne Ice	2–7	Sydney Bears	Macquarie Ice Rink	
9 JUL	16:30	Newcastle Northstars	6–3	Sydney Ice Dogs	Macquarie Ice Rink	
10 JUL	16:30	CBR Brave	9–1	Sydney Bears	Macquarie Ice Rink	
16 JUL	17:30	Sydney Bears	4–7	Newcastle Northstars	Hunter Ice Skating Stadium	
16 JUL	17:30	Melbourne Mustangs	4–9	CBR Brave	Phillip Ice Skating Centre	
17 JUL	17:00	Melbourne Mustangs	4–6	CBR Brave	Phillip Ice Skating Centre	
23 JUL	17:00	Melbourne Ice	4–3 (OT)	Melbourne Mustangs	O’Brien Icehouse	
23 JUL	17:30	Newcastle Northstars	3–9	CBR Brave	Phillip Ice Skating Centre	
24 JUL	17:00	Newcastle Northstars	2–8	CBR Brave	Phillip Ice Skating Centre	
30 JUL	17:30	Sydney Ice Dogs	4–8	Newcastle Northstars	Hunter Ice Skating Stadium	

==== August ====
August fixtures
Date	Time	Away	Score	Home	Location	Recap
6 AUG	16:30	Newcastle Northstars	8–5	Sydney Bears	Macquarie Ice Rink	
6 AUG	17:00	Sydney Ice Dogs	5–3	Melbourne Ice	O’Brien Icehouse	
7 AUG	14:00	Sydney Ice Dogs	4–6	Melbourne Mustangs	O’Brien Icehouse	
13 AUG	16:30	Melbourne Mustangs	3–2	Sydney Bears	Macquarie Ice Rink	
13 AUG	17:30	Sydney Ice Dogs	1–8	CBR Brave	Phillip Ice Skating Centre	
14 AUG	16:30	Melbourne Mustangs	9–6	Sydney Ice Dogs	Macquarie Ice Rink	
19 AUG	19:30	Sydney Bears	12–1	Sydney Ice Dogs	Macquarie Ice Rink	
20 AUG	17:00	Newcastle Northstars	2–3 (OT)	Melbourne Ice	O’Brien Icehouse	
21 AUG	14:00	Newcastle Northstars	7–4	Melbourne Mustangs	O’Brien Icehouse	
27 AUG	16:30	Newcastle Northstars	3–4 (OT)	Sydney Bears	Macquarie Ice Rink	
27 AUG	17:00	Sydney Ice Dogs	2–12	Melbourne Mustangs	O’Brien Icehouse	
28 AUG	14:00	Sydney Ice Dogs	2–4	Melbourne Ice	O’Brien Icehouse	

=== Standings ===
Pos	Team	Pld	W	OTW	OTL	L	GF	GA	GD	Pts	Qualification or relegation
1	CBR Brave (C)	18	15	0	1	2	141	56	+85	49	2022 Goodall Cup Finals
2	Newcastle Northstars	20	15	0	2	3	112	74	+38	47	2022 Goodall Cup Finals
3	Sydney Bears	20	10	2	0	8	105	93	+12	34	2022 Goodall Cup Finals
4	Melbourne Mustangs	18	8	0	1	9	89	83	+6	28	2022 Goodall Cup Finals
5	Melbourne Ice	20	3	2	0	15	54	116	−62	13	
6	Sydney Ice Dogs	20	3	0	0	17	66	145	−79	9	

Source: AIHL Elite Prospects
Rules for classification:
Tie-break: 1) points; 2) goal difference; 3) number of goals scored
Points: 3 points for regulation win; 2 points for OT or SO win; 1 point for OT or SO loss; 0 points for regulation loss
Note: CBR Brave and Melbourne Mustangs were awarded 3 points each for 2 cancelled games. Their points tallies reflect this adjustment.
(C) Champion

=== Skater statistics ===
2022 AIHL season top-ten skater statistics for points, goals, assists and penalty minutes.

Points
#	Name	Team	Pos	Pts
1	(Australia) Casey Kubara	CB	F	52
2	(Australia) Wehebe Darge	CB	F	50
3	(Canada) Mario Valery-Trabucco	CB	F	46
4	(Canada) Francis Drolet	NN	F	45
5	(Canada) Scott Timmins	MM	F	41
6	(Canada) Daniel Berno	NN	F	40
7	(Australia) Tomas Landa	SB	F	38
8	(Switzerland) Andreas Camenzind	CB	F	38
9	(Canada) Ty Wishart	MM	D	36
10	(Canada) Alexandre Gauthier	SB	D	34

Goals
#	Name	Team	Pos	G
1	(Australia) Casey Kubara	CB	F	25
2	(Canada) Scott Timmins	MM	F	23
3	(Canada) Daniel Berno	NN	F	23
4	(Canada) Mario Valery-Trabucco	CB	F	20
5	(Canada) Francis Drolet	NN	F	18
6	(Australia) Wehebe Darge	CB	F	17
7	(Australia) Tomas Landa	SB	F	16
8	(Australia) Strat Allen	SD	D	15
9	(Switzerland) Andreas Camenzind	CB	F	14
10	(Australia) Robert Malloy	NN	D	14

Assists
#	Name	Team	Pos	A
1	(Australia) Wehebe Darge	CB	F	33
2	(Canada) Ty Wishart	MM	D	29
3	(Australia) Casey Kubara	CB	F	27
4	(Canada) Francis Drolet	NN	F	27
5	(Canada) Mario Valery-Trabucco	CB	F	26
6	(Switzerland) Andreas Camenzind	CB	F	24
7	(Canada) Alexandre Gauthier	SB	D	23
8	(Australia) Tomas Landa	SB	F	22
9	(Canada) Michael Poirier	SB	D	22
10	(Australia) Tyler Kubara	CB	F	22

Penalty minutes
#	Name	Team	Pos	PIM
1	(Australia) Sam Hodic	MI	F	64
2	(Canada) Alexandre Gauthier	SB	D	59
3	(Australia) Alec Stephenson	SD	F	57
4	(Australia) Liam Manwarring	NN	F	53
5	(Australia) Joey Hughes	CB	F	51
6	(Australia) Shannon McGregor	SD	D	49
7	(Australia) Sean Oultram	NN	D	47
8	(Australia) Jermaine Joyce	MI	D	44
9	(Australia) Patrick Nadin	NN	F	39
10	(Australia) Christian Pansino	MI	F	38

=== Goaltender statistics ===
2022 AIHL season top-ten^{1} goaltender statistics for goals against average and save percentage.

^{1} Due to reduced regular season and competing teams in 2022, there were only 6 goaltenders who played 10+ games to qualify for these lists.

Goals against average
#	Name	Team	Pos	GAA
1	(Australia) Alexandre Tetreault	CB	G	2.74
2	(Australia) James Downie	NN	G	3.77
3	(Australia) Glen Forbes White	SB	G	4.19
4	(Australia) Sebastian Woodlands	MM	G	4.39
5	(Australia) Michael James	MI	G	5.71
6	(Australia) Jakob Doornbos	SD	G	6.80

Save percentage
#	Name	Team	Pos	SV%
1	(Australia) Alexandre Tetreault	CB	G	.893
2	(Australia) James Downie	NN	G	.883
3	(Australia) Sebastian Woodlands	MM	G	.873
4	(Australia) Michael James	MI	G	.862
5	(Australia) Jakob Doornbos	SD	G	.853
6	(Australia) Glen Forbes White	SB	G	.851

=== Awards ===
==== Skaters Network local player of the week ====
Every Tuesday the League, through sponsorship, names a local player of the week.
The award is based on the following criteria:

- individual performance, including significant game statistics;
- contribution to the team's success through individual leadership abilities; and
- performance off the ice, including community engagement.

Round	Awarded to	Pos	Ref
1	(Australia) Wehebe Darge	F	Ref
2	(Australia) James Downie	G	Ref
3	(Australia) Jordon Brunt	F	Ref
4	(Australia) Christian Pansino	F	Ref
5	(Australia) Kenshin Hayashi	F	Ref
6	(Australia) Casey Kubara	F	Ref
7	(Australia) Strat Allen	F	Ref
8	(Australia) Sebastian Woodlands	G	Ref
9	(Australia) Glen Forbes-White	G	Ref
10	(New Zealand) Jake Ratcliffe	F	Ref
11	(Australia) Richard Tesarik	F	Ref
12	(Australia) Mitchell Humphries	F	Ref
13	(Australia) Michael James	G	Ref
14	(Australia) Liam Manwarring	F	Ref
15	(Australia) Daniel Pataky	D	Ref
16	(Australia) Matt Armstrong	F	Ref
17	(Australia) Ellesse Carini	F	Ref
18	(Australia) Tim Nikitin	F	Ref

==== Season awards ====
Below lists the 2022 AIHL regular season award winners.

Award	Name	Team
MVP	(Australia) Casey Kubara	CBR Brave
Goaltender	(Australia) Michael James	Melbourne Ice
Defenceman	(Canada) Ty Wishart	Melbourne Mustangs
Local	(Australia) Casey Kubara	CBR Brave
Rookie	(Australia) Ethan Hawes	Newcastle Northstars
Coach	(Canada) Kevin Noble	Newcastle Northstars

== Goodall Cup playoffs ==
The 2022 finals weekend will see the implementation of the new finals format, announced by AIHL in March 2022, for the first time. It is scheduled to begin on Friday 2 September with the major and minor semi-finals. On Saturday 3 September, the first ever AIHL preliminary final will take place, while the Goodall Cup final will be held on Sunday 4 September. Following the end of the regular season the top four teams advance to the finals weekend, which is to be held at O’Brien Icehouse in Docklands, Melbourne. This will be the ninth time the Icehouse has hosted the AIHL Finals. The series involves single game match-ups at all stages. The top two teams from the AIHL regular season play-off in the major semi-final for an automatic spot in the Goodall Cup final. The teams who finished third and fourth in the regular season play-off in an elimination game in the minor semi-final. The winner of the minor semi-final advances to the preliminary final to play the loser of the major semi-final. The winner of the preliminary final progresses to the Goodall Cup final and the loser is eliminated. The winner of the grand final is named AIHL Champion and lifts the historic Goodall Cup.

The Brave, Northstars, Bears and Mustangs qualified for the 2022 finals weekend. The Mustangs were the first team eliminated with the Brave progressing straight from the semi-finals to the Goodall Cup Final. The Northstars defeated the Bears with a golden goal in overtime in the first ever preliminary final to reach the Goodall Cup Final. The Brave won the grand final, defeating the Northstars, to lift the Goodall Cup for the second time in the team's history. Joey Hughes was named Finals MVP after the grand final. Hughes continued to extend his record as the most decorated player in AIHL history, winning his seventh Goodall Cup.

Semifinals
2 September – Melbourne
CBR Brave	6
Newcastle Northstars	1
2 September – Melbourne
Sydney Bears	7
Melbourne Mustangs	3

Preliminary final
3 September – Melbourne
Newcastle Northstars	4
Sydney Bears	3

Grand final
4 September – Melbourne
CBR Brave	3
Newcastle Northstars	2

All times are UTC+10:00

=== Semi-finals ===
2 September 2022; 17:00	Sydney Bears	7–3 (2–3, 2–0, 3–0)	Melbourne Mustangs	O’Brien Icehouse

Game reference

Anthony Kimlin
Goalies
Sebastian Woodlands
Referees:
Rob Love
Joey Theriault
Linesmen:
Russel Dow
Haydan Rogers

Jake Ratcliffe (Gauthier, Newmark) – 2:03	1 – 0
	1 – 1	10:18 – Lee Turner (S.Belic, A.Belic)
	1 – 2	13:47 – Sean Jones (Wishart)
Alexander Gauthier (Landa, Haselhurst) – 15:52	2 – 2
	2 – 3	18:41 – Matt Armstrong (Timmins, Wishart)
Michael Poirier (Landa, Gauthier) – 31:11	3 – 3
Tomas Landa (Gauthier, Poirier) – 34:08	4 – 3
Kenshin Hayashi (Haselhurst, Kimlin) – 53:27	5 – 3
Kenshin Hayashi (Poirier, Clare) – 55:15	6 – 3
Brian Kim (Unassisted) – 57:39	7 – 3

8 min
Penalties
10 min
38
Shots
36

2 September 2022; 20:30	CBR Brave	6–1 (1–1, 2–0, 3–0)	Newcastle Northstars	O’Brien Icehouse

Game reference

Alex Tetreault
Goalies
Charles Smart
Referees:
Jeff Klinck
Kent Unwin
Linesmen:
David Rehak
Mark Peruzzo

	0 – 1	5:44 – Robert Malloy (Tesarik, Manwarring)
Mitchell Henning (Valery-Trabucco, Cockerill) – 12:19	1 – 1
Joseph Hughes (Camenzind) – 21:29	2 – 1
Joseph Hughes (Unassisted) – 31:02	3 – 1
Wehebe Darge (Bronte, Lodge) – 45:24	4 – 1
Tyler Kubara (Darge, Hughes) – 52:52	5 – 1
Kai Miettinen (Lodge, Henning) – 54:56	6 – 1

12 min
Penalties
6 min
54
Shots
28

=== Preliminary final ===
3 September 2022; 17:00	Newcastle Northstars	4–3 (OT) (2–2, 0–0, 1–1, 1–0)	Sydney Bears	O’Brien Icehouse

Game reference

Charles Smart
Goalies
Anthony Kimlin
Referees:
Kent Unwin
Rob Love
Linesmen:
Haydan Rogers
Mark Peruzzo

	0 – 1	01:38 – Tomas Landa (Hayashi)
	0 – 2	05:51 – Tomas Landa (Gauthier)
Ethan Hawes (Taylor, Ward) – 10:34	1 – 2
Richard Tesarik (Hawes) – 17:44	2 – 2
	2 – 3	53:00 – Tomas Landa (Unassisted)
Daniel Berno (Hawes, Malloy) – 57:49	3 – 3
Patrick Nadin (Berno) – 62:50	4 – 3

10 min
Penalties
6 min
27
Shots
29

=== Final ===
4 September 2022; 14:00	CBR Brave	3–2 (2–0, 0–1, 1–1)	Newcastle Northstars	O’Brien Icehouse

Game reference

Alex Tetreault
Goalies
Charles Smart
Referees:
Joey Theriault
Jeff Klinck
Linesmen:
David Rehak
Russel Dow

Joseph Hughes (Cockerill, Brunt) – 09:07	1 – 0
Wehebe Darge (Giorgi) – 10:29	2 – 0
	2 – 1	24:44 – Francis Drolet (Malloy, Tesarik)
Casey Kubara (Darge, Valery-Trabucco) – 53:32	3 – 1
	3 – 2	59:52 – Robert Malloy (Hawes)

10 min
Penalties
12 min
53
Shots
22

== Trans-Tasman All-Star game ==
2022 was the inaugural season for the Trans-Tasman All-Star game between the champions of the AIHL and champions of the New Zealand Ice Hockey League (NZIHL). The game forms part of the Strategic Partnership Agreement signed between Ice Hockey Australia (IHA) and New Zealand Ice Hockey Federation (NZIHF) on 15 February 2022. Game was cancelled and replaced with a Trans-Tasman Challenge thee-game series between the Australian and New Zealand national teams, held at O'Brien IceHouse in Melbourne between 4 and 6 November 2022. Australia won the series 3–0.

=== All-star game ===
2022	AIHL champion	Cancelled	NZIHL champion
