= 2014 NZIHL season =

The 2014 NZIHL Season was the ninth season of the New Zealand Ice Hockey League, the top level of ice hockey in New Zealand. Five teams participated in the league, and the Canterbury Red Devils won their fourth championship by defeating the Dunedin Thunder in the final.

== Standings ==
Team	Pld	W	OTW	OTL	L	GF	GA	GD	Pts	Qualification
Canterbury Red Devils	16	12	0	1	3	79	58	+21	37	Qualify for finals
Dunedin Thunder	16	10	0	1	5	72	67	+5	31	Qualify for finals
Southern Stampede	16	6	1	2	7	71	74	−3	22	
Botany Swarm	16	5	2	2	7	71	70	+1	21	
West Auckland Admirals	16	1	3	0	12	62	86	−24	9	

== Results ==
All times are local (New Zealand Standard Time - UTC+12).

7 June 2014; 16:45	Canterbury Red Devils	4–2 (1–0, 1–1, 2–1)	Southern Stampede	Alpine Ice Sports Centre

Game reference

Justin Findlay
Goalies
Aston Brookes
Referee:
(New Zealand) Ryan Cairns
Linesmen:
(New Zealand) William Scott
(New Zealand) Chris Watson

B. Spiers (D. Tonks, J. Lawrence) – 12:11	1–0
	1–1	22:28 – M. McRae (M. Schneider, B. Lee)
V. Kutny (D. Tonks, J. Lawrence) – 26:08	2–1
	2–2	50:45 – M. McRae (M. Schneider, A. Blanchette)
E. Zych (V. Hvorostinins, C. Eaden) – 54:24	3–2
V. Hvorostinins (E. Zych) (ENG) – 59:34	4–2

34 min
Penalties
26 min
29
Shots
27

8 June 2014; 16:45	Canterbury Red Devils	4–2 (1–2, 2–0, 1–0)	Southern Stampede	Alpine Ice Sports Centre

Game reference

Michael Coleman
Goalies
Aston Brookes
Referee:
(New Zealand) Chris Watson
Linesmen:
(New Zealand) Ryan Cairns
(New Zealand) William Scott

	0–1	1:36 – M. McRae (C. Frear) (PP)
	0–2	16:24 – M. McRae (H. Macharg)
H. Argyle (V. Hvorostinins, E. Zych) (PP) – 19:10	1–2
V. Hvorostinins (C. Eaden, H. Argyle) (PP) – 27:05	2–2
C. Eaden (D. Harrop) (PP) – 28:28	3–2
J. Lawrence (D. Harrop, C. Eaden) (PP) – 57:10	4–2

69 min
Penalties
85 min
37
Shots
32

14 June 2014; 16:45	Canterbury Red Devils	8–4 (3–1, 4–1, 1–2)	West Auckland Admirals	Alpine Ice Sports Centre

Game reference

Justin Findlay
Goalies
Rick Parry
Referee:
(New Zealand) Scott William
Linesmen:
(New Zealand) Kyle Matthews
(New Zealand) Chris Watson

	0–1	4:55 – N. Henderson (C. Allington)
V. Hvorostinins (V. Kutny, T. Lencses) – 7:15	1–1
V. Kutny (V. Hvorostinins) – 11:24	2–1
V. Kutny (V. Hvorostinins, T. Lencses) (PP) – 19:15	3–1
A. Purver (J. Kim, J. Greenwood) – 22:52	4–1
V. Hvorostinins (V. Kutny, D. Harrop) (PP) – 32:51	5–1
	5–2	34:49 – Y. Chauviere (S. Clemie)
V. Hvorostinins (V. Kutny, M. Macharg) – 35:06	6–2
B. Speirs (C. Eaden, E. Zych) – 38:36	7–2
	7–3	41:13 – G. Patterson (J. Chai)
	7–4	49:40 – (J. Daigle) (PP)
T. Lencses (D. Harrop, M. Macharg) (PP) – 56:18	8–4

10 min
Penalties
30 min
40
Shots
27

14 June 2014; 17:00	Botany Swarm	2–4 (0–0, 2–3, 0–1)	Dunedin Thunder	Paradice Botany Downs

Game reference

Niklas Marschall
Goalies
Matt Canaday
Referee:
(New Zealand) Braden O'Loughlin
Linesmen:
(United Kingdom) Oliver Finch
(Canada) Brian Forster

	0–1	25:48 – P. Heyd (J. Orr)
	0–2	34:55 – B. Gavoille (T. Darling)
J. Challis (A. Polosov, R. Vortanov) – 36:06	1–2
J. Sanders (B. Contratto) – 36:58	2–2
	2–3	39:57 – A. Robichaud (M. Pokorny) (PP)
	2–4	45:44 – A. Robichaud (G. Leclancher)

12 min
Penalties
10 min
44
Shots
38

15 June 2014; 16:30	Botany Swarm	5–11 (3–3, 1–4, 1–4)	Dunedin Thunder	Paradice Botany Downs

Game reference

Michael Hopkinson
Goalies
Matt Canaday
Referee:
(Canada) Michael Naylor
Linesmen:
(Canada) Brian Forester
(New Zealand) Braden O'Loughlin

J. Sanders (B. Contratto) – 3:10	1–0
	1–1	3:40 – M. Enright (K. Fyfe, A. Robichaud)
	1–2	11:33 – M. Enright (A. Robichaud)
M. Attwell (K. Ball, G. Ferguson) – 13:25	2–2
	2–3	18:57 – C. Harrison (P. Heyd) (SH)
B. Contratto (O. Hay) (PP) – 19:24	3–3
	3–4	22:06 – J. Orr (K. Fyfe, J. Hurring)
	3–5	23:20 – M. Frear (P. Heyd, B. Gavoille)
B. Contratto (A. Henderson, J. Sanders) – 24:10	4–5
	4–6	25:19 – P. Heyd (C. Harrison)
	4–7	31:09 – A. Robichaud (G. Leclancher, K. Fyfe) (PP)
	4–8	42:32 – P. Heyd (J. Orr)
	4–9	45:21 – K. Fyfe (M. Frear, A. Robichaud) (PP)
	4–10	49:19 – M. Enright (K. Fyfe) (PP)
J. Sanders (O. Hay, B. Contratto) (SH) – 54:27	5–10
	5–11	58:07 – M. Frear (P. Heyd)

24 min
Penalties
28 min
44
Shots
43

15 June 2014; 16:45	Canterbury Red Devils	8–6 (4–1, 1–4, 3–1)	West Auckland Admirals	Alpine Ice Sports Centre

Game reference

Michael Coleman
Goalies
Rick Parry
Referee:
(New Zealand) Kyle Matthews
Linesmen:
(New Zealand) Ryan Cairns
(New Zealand) Scott Young

	0–1	00:40 – G. Patterson (G. McLeish, J. Daigle)
D. Harrop (B. Apps, J. Ratcliffe) – 5:04	1–1
B. Speirs (C. Eaden, D. Tonks) – 16:34	2–1
D. Tonks (E. Zych, C. Eaden) – 16:54	3–1
V. Hvorostinins (V. Kutny) – 17:58	4–1
	4–2	20:28 – G. Patterson (N. Henderson, C. Allington) (PP)
	4–3	25:12 – D. Dickson (J. Chai, A. Hart)
V. Hvorostinins (T. Lencses) (PP) – 30:12	5–3
	5–4	34:41 – Y. Chauviere (J. Daigle, C. Allington) (PP)
	5–5	38:57 – C. Allington (J. Daigle, Y. Chauviere) (PP)
	5–6	48:07 – J. Daigle (Y. Chauviere)
T. Lencses (M. Macharg, V. Kutny) – 48:31	6–6
V. Kutny (V. Hvorostinins) – 52:00	7–6
M. Macharg (PP) (ENG) – 59:52	8–6

33 min
Penalties
10 min
42
Shots
35

21 June 2014; 16:45	West Auckland Admirals	4–7 (1–2, 3–2, 0–3)	Botany Swarm	Paradice Avondale

Game reference

Rick Parry
Goalies
Niklas Marschall
Referee:
(Canada) Brian Forster
Linesmen:
(New Zealand) Aaron Clough
(New Zealand) Braden O'Loughlin

	0–1	2:20 – B. Contratto (O. Hay)
	0–2	4:31 – A. Henderson (A. Hay, B. Contratto)
Y. Chauviere (J. Daigle) – 10:34	1–2
	1–3	23:40 – J. Challis (M. Attwell, K. Ball)
	1–4	28:58 – K. Ball (J. Challis, A. Polosov) (PP)
C. Allington (J. Daigle, Y. Chauviere) – 30:51	2–4
D. Dickson (J. Chai) (PP) – 33:54	3–4
D. Dickson (A. Hart) – 36:11	4–4
	4–5	43:00 – O. Hay (G. Ferguson, J. Sanders) (PP)
	4–6	45:14 – O. Hay (J. Sanders, B. Contratto)
	4–7	47:40 – B. Contratto (J. Sanders, G. Ferguson)

14 min
Penalties
41 min
45
Shots
45

21 June 2014; 19:00	Southern Stampede	4–3 OT (2–1, 1–0, 0–2) (OT 1–0)	Dunedin Thunder	Ice Arena; Attendance: 500

Game reference

Aston Brookes
Goalies
Matt Canaday
Referee:
(New Zealand) Ryan Cairns
Linesmen:
(New Zealand) Aaron Chrisholm
(New Zealand) Mark Symons

	0–1	10:26 – M. Pokorny (S. Harrison)
R. Strayer (B. Lee, C. Burns) – 15:37	1–1
M. Schneider – 16:04	2–1
W. Compton (M. Schneider) (PP) – 37:50	3–1
	3–2	45:43 – P. Heyd (M. Frear)
	3–3	58:37 – J. Kantanen (B. Gavoille)
B. Haines (SH) – 61:08	4–3

14 min
Penalties
10 min
33
Shots
23

22 June 2014; 16:45	West Auckland Admirals	4–3 OT (2–1, 1–1, 0–1) (OT 1–0)	Botany Swarm	Paradice Avondale

Game reference

Rick Parry
Goalies
Niklas Marschall
Referee:
(Canada) Michael Naylor
Linesmen:
(New Zealand) Aaron Clough
(Canada) Brian Forster

T. McMaster (J. Daigle, C. Allington) (PP) – 2:42	1–0
J. Chai – 8:43	2–0
	2–1	17:14 – L. Birgel (A. Henderson, K. Ball) (PP)
D. Dickson (N. Craig, Y. Chauviere) – 31:20	3–1
	3–2	34:15 – J. Challis (J. Sanders, O. Hay) (PP)
	3–3	51:41 – M. Attwell
J. Daigle (J. Chai, Y. Chauviere) (PP) – 63:56	4–3

32 min
Penalties
8 min
55
Shots
34

22 June 2014; 19:00	Southern Stampede	3–5 (1–1, 1–1, 1–3)	Dunedin Thunder	Ice Arena; Attendance: 500

Game reference

Aston Brookes
Goalies
Matt Canaday
Referee:
(New Zealand) Ryan Cairns
Linesmen:
(New Zealand) Aaron Chisholm
(New Zealand) Mark Symons

	0–1	6:36 – M. Enright (J. Kantanen)
R. Strayer (M. Schneider, M. McRae) (PP2) – 17:44	1–1
	1–2	25:53 – M. Frear (J. Kantanen) (PP2)
M. McRae (M. Schneider) – 35:59	2–2
	2–3	46:56 – S. Harrison (T. Darling)
	2–4	49:21 – M. Frear (J. Kantanen, M. Pokorny) (PP)
R. Strayer (W. Compton) – 52:36	3–4
	3–5	59:41 – P. Heyd (J. Kantanen) (ENG)

16 min
Penalties
44 min
38
Shots
35

27 June 2014; 19:00	Southern Stampede	9–7 (1–1, 2–3, 6–3)	Botany Swarm	Ice Arena

Game reference

Aston Brookes
Goalies
Niklas Marschall
Referee:
(Canada) Michael Naylor
Linesmen:
(New Zealand) Aaron Chisholm
(New Zealand) Andy Mills

	0–1	9:04 – M. Attwell (A. Hay)
C. Burns – 17:15	1–1
	1–2	23:25 – J. Challis (K. Ball, M. Attwell)
M. McRae (M. Schneider) – 26:18	2–2
	2–3	31:33 – K. Ball (B. Contratto)
M. Schneider (M. McRae, B. Dunford) (PP) – 38:38	3–3
	3–4	39:54 – B. Contratto (J. Sanders, G. Ferguson)
M. McRae (B. Haines, M. Schneider) – 40:13	4–4
M. Schneider (H. Macharg, B. Haines) (SH) – 42:02	5–4
C. Burns (W. Compton) – 48:15	6–4
	6–5	50:25 – K. Ball (J. Challis, A. Henderson) (PP)
B. Dunford (B. Lee) (SH) – 52:43	7–5
R. Strayer (M. McRae, B. Dunford) (PP) – 53:57	8–5
	8–6	54:18 – S. Randell (A. Polosov)
M. Schneider (ENG) – 59:17	9–6
	9–7	59:52 – J. Sanders (B. Contratto, O. Hay) (PP)

20 min
Penalties
8 min
34
Shots
61

v

v

v

v

v

v

v

v

v

v

v

v

v

v

v

v

v

v

v

v

v

v

v

v

v

v

v

v

== Final ==
v

v

v
