= 2012 NZIHL season =

The 2012 NZIHL season was the eighth season of the New Zealand Ice Hockey League, the top level of ice hockey in New Zealand. Five teams participated in the league, and the Canterbury Red Devils won their second championship by defeating the Southern Stampede in the final.

== Regular season ==
	Club	GP	W	OTW	OTL	L	Goals	Pts
1.	Southern Stampede	16	10	1	0	5	82:61	32
2.	Canterbury Red Devils	16	7	3	2	4	80:68	29
3.	Dunedin Thunder	16	8	1	2	5	76:66	28
4.	West Auckland Admirals	16	5	2	1	8	74:81	20
5.	Botany Swarm	16	3	0	2	11	45:81	11

== Final ==
- Southern Stampede - Canterbury Red Devils 5:6 SO
