= 2009 NZIHL season =

The 2009 NZIHL season was the fifth season of the New Zealand Ice Hockey League, the top level of ice hockey in New Zealand. Five teams participated in the league, and the Canterbury Red Devils won the championship by defeating the Southern Stampede in the final.

== Regular season ==
	Club	GP	W	T	L	GF–GA	Pts
1.	Canterbury Red Devils	16	14	0	2	133:35	28
2.	Southern Stampede	16	12	2	2	97:37	26
3.	Botany Swarm	16	7	2	7	71:70	16
4.	West Auckland Admirals	16	3	2	11	40:99	8
5.	Dunedin Thunder	16	1	0	15	42:142	2

== Final ==
- Canterbury Red Devils – Southern Stampede 5:4
