= 2010 NZIHL season =

The 2010 NZIHL season was the sixth season of the New Zealand Ice Hockey League, the top level of ice hockey in New Zealand. Five teams participated in the league, and the Botany Swarm won the championship by defeating the West Auckland Admirals in the final.

== Regular season ==
	Club	GP	W	OTW	T	OTL	L	GF–GA	Pts
1.	Botany Swarm	16	9	1	3	2	1	76:50	34
2.	West Auckland Admirals	16	5	2	3	1	5	74:77	26
3.	Canterbury Red Devils	16	8	0	2	2	4	92:75	26
4.	Dunedin Thunder	16	3	0	5	1	7	71:84	18
5.	Southern Stampede	16	3	1	3	1	8	51:78	16

== Final ==
- Botany Swarm – West Auckland Admirals 3:1
