= Botany Swarm =

- City: Auckland, New Zealand
- League: New Zealand Ice Hockey League
- Founded: 2005; 21 years ago
- Home arena: Paradice Ice Skating Botany
- Colours: White, maroon, black, yellow
- General manager: (South Africa) Quinlen Steytler
- Head coach: (New Zealand) Kevin Simon
- Captain: (New Zealand) Michael Attwell
- Website: botanyswarm.co.nz

Franchise history
- 2005-2007: South Auckland Swarm
- 2007-present;: Botany Swarm

Championships
- Birgel Cup: 4 (2007, 2008, 2010, 2011)

The Botany Swarm is a semi-professional ice hockey team based in East Auckland, New Zealand. The team is a member of the New Zealand Ice Hockey League (NZIHL). The team was founded in 2005 as the South Auckland Swarm. Their name was changed prior to the 2007 season due to it being similar to one of the other teams and to better reflect the area in Auckland where their home rink is located (in the suburb of Botany Downs). They play their home games out of the Paradice Ice Skating Botany Rink known as The Hive.

== History ==
=== 2017 Season ===
7 May 2017, the Swarm announced that after 11 seasons, head coach Andreas Kaißer has stepped down, and will be replaced by former Swarm alumnus Brandon Contratto. However for personal reasons Brandon was unable to commit to the role. Former assistant coach Jeff Boehme took the role of head coach for the 2017 season.

The Botany Swarm welcomed four new imports for the 2017 season: Petr Zítka from the Czech Republic, Ryan Widmar from Illinois, Maximilian Hadraschek from Germany and Alex Mitsionis from Ohio.

=== 2018 Season ===
10 December 2017, the Swarm announced that Ian Wannamaker was appointed as the new head coach. Ian Wannamaker played for the Botany Swarm from 2007-2015 and represented New Zealand from 2010-2013, 2015.

23 December 2017, the Swarm announced that assistant coach of the Kelowna Rockets Travis Crickard was appointed as the new assistant coach.

The Botany Swarm welcomed four new imports for the 2018 season: Declan Weir an Irish Canadian, Harry Ferguson from Scotland, Colin Langham from Georgia and Lucas Bombardier from Vermont.

26 May 2018, Alexandr Polozov played his 100th game for the Botany Swarm against the Canterbury Red Devils.

9 June 2018, Jordan Challis played his 150th game for the Botany Swarm against the Dunedin Thunder.

21 July 2018, Logan Fraser played his 50th game for the Botany Swarm against the Dunedin Thunder.

5 August 2018, The Botany Swarm had their 200th NZIHL game.

=== 2019 Season ===
22 February 2019, Travis Crickard appointed Botany Swarm General Manager/CEO.

24 February 2019, Joel Rindelaub appointed Botany Swarm Interim Assistant General Manager.

The Botany Swarm welcomed four new imports for the 2019 season: Andrea Ricca from Italy, Corey McEwen born in Cardiff and now living in Toronto, Corey Morgan from New Jersey and Daniel Iasenza from Montreal.

11 May 2019, Michelle Cox appointed Botany Swarm Head Coach.

9 June 2019, Andrew Hay played his 200th game for the Botany Swarm against the West Auckland Admirals.

=== 2021 Season ===
The roster included goaltender Grace Harrison, one of only two women competing in the league.

== Season-by-season results ==
Season	GP	W	OTW	T	OTL	L	GF	GA	PTS	Finish	Playoff	Ref
2005	6	2	–	2	–	2	21	20	11	3rd	Did not qualify	
2006	6	5	–	0	–	1	25	17	15	1st	Lost final (Southern Stampede)	
2007	10	8	–	1	–	1	44	28	26	2nd	Won final (Canterbury Red Devils)	
2008	12	8	–	3	–	1	65	35	31	2nd	Won final (Canterbury Red Devils)	
2009	16	7	–	2	–	7	71	70	16	3rd	Did not qualify	
2010	16	10	1	–	2	3	76	50	34	1st	Won final (West Auckland Admirals)	
2011	16	12	0	–	1	3	94	44	37	1st	Won final (Southern Stampede)	
2012	16	3	0	–	2	11	45	82	11	5th	Did not qualify	
2013	16	7	2	–	4	3	110	77	30	3rd	Did not qualify	
2014	16	5	2	–	2	7	71	70	21	4th	Did not qualify	
2015	16	4	1	–	2	9	67	87	16	3rd	Did not qualify	
2016	16	6	1	–	0	9	63	73	20	4th	Did not qualify	
2017	16	4	1	–	2	9	53	95	16	4th	Did not qualify	
2018	16	5	0	–	1	10	59	86	16	4th	Did not qualify	
2019	16	10	0	–	1	5	81	49	31	2nd	Lost semifinal (West Auckland Admirals)	
2020	4	0	0	–	1	4	7	26	1	2nd	Playoffs not held	
2021	14	6	2	–	0	6	54	51	22	–	Playoffs cancelled	

== Players ==
=== Current roster ===
Team roster for the 2026 NZIHL Season

Botany Swarm roster - 2026 NZIHL season
Active roster		Coaching staff
Goaltenders: 1 (New Zealand) Connor Parr; 2 (New Zealand) Caleb Price; 29 (New Zealand) Grace Harrison; 30 (Canada) Alexa Gibson; 90 (New Zealand) Bartek Ewertowski; - Kaleb Rock (AF); Defencemen: 4 (New Zealand) Luke Simon; 7 (Canada) Nathan Hufnagel (AF); 11 (Kazakhstan) Alan Kazhenov; 23 (New Zealand) Lennart Wimmer; 24 (New Zealand) Remy Sandoy; 82 (New Zealand) Adam Stitely; 85 (Switzerland) Stefan Thüler (AF); 86 (New Zealand) Oliver Hay	Forwards: 5 (New Zealand) Kyle March; 6 (New Zealand) Michael Attwell (C); 9 (New Zealand) Jackson Fontaine; 15 (New Zealand) Markus MacDonald; 16 (New Zealand) Josh Steen; 17 (New Zealand) Ivan Dalmatau; 18 (New Zealand) Kyle Jonsson; 20 (Canada) Wilson Kushnuriuk (AF); 21 (New Zealand) Dima Koptev; 25 (New Zealand) Joshua Rawiri; 26 (Hong Kong) Nicholas Winchester (I); 27 (New Zealand) Leon Quigley; 28 (New Zealand) Ondrej Kozak; 33 (New Zealand) Sam Webb; 36 (New Zealand) Shakayden Pang; 62 (Latvia) Rudolfs Oto Lapsa (I); 82 (New Zealand) Ritchie Hopkinson; 89 (New Zealand) Lucas Fontaine; 94 (United States) Nico Hemming (I)	Head Coach: (New Zealand) Kevin Simon; Coaches: (Canada) Cameron Stephen (AC); (South Africa) Quinlen Steytler (AC); (South Africa) Nicole Steytler (TM); Legend (C) Captain (A) Alternate Captain (I) Import player (AF) Affiliate player
Last updated on: 19 July 2026
Elite Prospects NZIHL

=== Franchise scoring leaders ===
There are the top ten point scorers in franchise history. Figures are updated after each completed NZIHL regular season.

#	Player	Seasons	Pos	GP	G	A	Pts	PIM
1	(New Zealand) KC Ball	2005-18	F	184	73	118	191	82
2	(New Zealand) Jordan Challis	2007-18	F	157	64	81	145	383
3	(New Zealand) Alex Polosov	2010-14, 2016-18	F	113	62	75	137	327
4	(United States) Brandon Contratto	2013-15	F	47	59	66	125	105
5	(New Zealand) Joshua Hay	2005-13, 2017-18	F	119	54	55	109	343
6	(New Zealand) Michael Attwell	2009-17	F	131	35	57	92	182
7	(New Zealand) Andrew Hay	2005-18	D	190	18	64	82	243
8	(New Zealand) Ian Wannamaker	2007-15	D	104	43	38	81	149
9	(New Zealand) Charlie Huber	2005-11, 2015	F	73	40	41	81	52
10	(New Zealand) Lyle Idoine	2005-12	F	90	28	45	73	302

=== Franchise all-time most appearances ===
There are the top ten player who have made the most appearances in franchise history. Figures are updated after each completed NZIHL regular season.

#	Player	Seasons	Pos	RS Games	PS Games
1	(New Zealand) Andrew Hay	2005-18	D	190	6
2	(New Zealand) KC Ball	2005-18	F	184	3
3	(New Zealand) Jordan Challis	2007-18	F	157	2
4	(New Zealand) Leith Thompson	2005-18	D	142	2
5	(New Zealand) Michael Attwell	2009-17	F	131	0
6	(New Zealand) Joshua Hay	2005-13, 2017-18	F	119	3
7	(New Zealand) Alex Polosov	2010-14, 2016-18	F	113	0
8	(New Zealand) Ian Wannamaker	2007-15	D	104	4
9	(New Zealand) Samuel Boniface	2007-10, 2012–13, 2015	F	98	2
10	(New Zealand) Lyle Idione	2005-12	F	90	3

== Technical staff ==
Current as of 24 June 2019

2018 NZIHL Botany Swarm Staff
Position	Name
Head coach	(New Zealand) Michelle Cox
Assistant coach	(Canada) Corey McEwen
General Manager	(United Kingdom) Philippa Kaisser
Physiotherapist	(Singapore) Sankaran Duntellu
Team Staff	(New Zealand) Michael Attwell

== Leaders ==
=== Team captains ===
#	Name	From	To
1	(New Zealand) Rene Aish	4 June 2005	7 August 2005
2	(Canada) George Pilgrim	9 June 2006	10 September 2006
3	(New Zealand) Andrew Hay	26 May 2007	Current

=== Head coaches ===
#	Manager	From	To	Played	Won	Overtime Won	Tied	Overtime Lost	Lost	GF	GA	Win %
1	(Germany) Andreas Kaisser	4 June 2005	4 September 2011	88	55	2	9	3	19	421	278	70.27%
2	(New Zealand) Philip Lyle	9 June 2012	27 August 2012	18	3	0	0	2	13	53	96	20.37%
3	(Germany) Andreas Kaisser	25 May 2013	7 August 2016	64	22	6	0	8	28	311	307	44.79%
4	(France) Jeff Boehme	26 May 2017	6 August 2017	16	4	1	0	2	9	53	95	33.33%
5	(New Zealand) Ian Wannamaker	26 May 2018	10 October 2018	16	5	0	0	1	10	59	86	33.33%
