= New Zealand Ice Hockey League =

Ice hockey league

- Current season, competition or edition: 2026 NZIHL season
- Sport: Ice hockey
- Founded: 2005 (21 years ago)
- CEO: Andreas Kaisser
- President: Andy Mills
- No. of teams: 6
- Country: New Zealand
- Confederation: NZIHF
- Continent: Oceania
- Most recent champions: SkyCity Stampede (11th title)
- Most titles: SkyCity Stampede (11 titles)
- Broadcaster: YouTube
- Website: www.nzihl.com

The New Zealand Ice Hockey League (NZIHL) is New Zealand's top-level ice hockey league. Established in 2005 by Guenther Birgel, the NZIHL is sanctioned by New Zealand Ice Hockey Federation (a member of the International Ice Hockey Federation).

The NZIHL is a semi-professional league where often local players don’t receive compensation, however, import players can sometimes receive small amounts to cover travel or housing. The NZIHL champion is awarded the Birgel Cup. The NZIHL is currently contested by six teams from three affiliated regions, including three teams from the North Island and three teams from the South Island. The most successful team in NZIHL history is the SkyCity Stampede, who have claimed eleven NZIHL championships. The current champion, from 2026, is the SkyCity Stampede. Their sixth championship in a row, and ninth in ten seasons.

== History ==
The New Zealand Ice Hockey League (NZIHL) was formed in 2005 to develop the sport of ice hockey in New Zealand by Guenther Birgel, and to give the top players in the country regular competitive hockey to improve the skill level of the game domestically and make New Zealand more competitive on the international stage. The league was set up with restrictions on import players (players born outside of New Zealand and Australia) to assist in the promotion of local players to help achieve its founding goals. Scheduling for NZIHL would fit into the Northern Hemisphere's ice hockey offseason, to enable a small amount of quality import players to help grow the sport and teach local players. The league was founded with four teams that included the Canterbury Red Devils, West Auckland Admirals, Southern Stampede and South Auckland Swarm.

The first ever game of the NZIHL in the inaugural 2005 season, was played on 3 June 2005 at Paradice Botany Downs, Auckland. The game saw hosts, West Auckland Admirals, defeat the visiting Canterbury Red Devils 5–2, with all goals coming in the third period after blank first and second periods.

The maiden season ran for four rounds and twelve games followed by a best of three finals series in Dunedin. Southern Stampede finished top of the regular season standings, claiming the league premiership. The Stampede were joined by the Admirals in the finals series. Southern Stampede were crowned NZIHL champions and lifted the maiden NZIHL Trophy with a 2–0 clean sweep of the finals series. Simon Glass, from the Stampede, finished as the league's first top points scorer with 14 points and took out the league MVP award. Steven Reid, also of the Stampede, was named Finals MVP.

Prior to 2007 season, the South Auckland Swarm changed its name to the Botany Swarm in order to differentiate themselves with a more unique name from the West Auckland Admirals. Previously there had been confusion around the similar names. Botany was chosen as the Swarm's home rink is located in the Auckland suburb of Botany Downs.

In 2008, the league expanded for the first time and added a fifth team. The Dunedin Thunder joined the league as a second team from Otago, creating the first South Island derby in the league along with the Southern Stampede. The Stampede relocated to Queenstown leaving the Thunder to build its supporter base in Dunedin.

For the 2010 season, the league announced a change to the NZIHL championship trophy. The NZIHL trophy was retired and the league introduced the Birgel Cup to be handed to the league champion who wins the NZIHL Finals.

== Teams ==
Current teams in the New Zealand Ice Hockey League.

New Zealand Ice Hockey League
Team	Colours	City	Arena	Capacity	Founded	Joined	Former names	Notes	Championships	Runners-up	Premierships
Auckland Mako		Auckland	Paradice Avondale & Paradice Botany Downs	500 & 400	2021			2021 expansion			
Botany Swarm		Auckland	Paradice Botany Downs	400	2005		South Auckland Swarm	Founding team	4	2	3
Canterbury Red Devils		Christchurch	Alpine Ice Centre	700	2005			Founding team	4	4	4
Dunedin Thunder		Dunedin	Dunedin Ice Stadium	1,850	2008		Dunedin Thunder	2008 expansion		2	1
Skycity Stampede		(Otago) Queenstown	Queenstown Ice Arena	642	2005		Southern Stampede	Founding team	8	3	8
West Auckland Admirals		Auckland	Paradice Avondale	500	2005			Founding team	1	5	1

=== Foundation clubs ===
The NZIHL had four foundation clubs, Canterbury Red Devils, West Auckland Admirals, Southern Stampede and South Auckland Swarm. These four teams covered three of four affiliated regions that make up the New Zealand Ice Hockey Federation, this being Auckland, Canterbury and Southern.

=== Expansion ===
In 2008, the first expansion of the NZIHL took place. Dunedin Thunder was founded and admitted into the league. With the Thunder entering the league and basing itself in Dunedin, the Southern Stampede, who has been based in Dunedin, moved to Queenstown. In 2021, the NZIHL expanded for a second time by admitted a third Auckland based team into the league. Auckland Mako joined the league after being established in the same year as a youth development team following IIHF competition cancellations in response to the COVID-19 pandemic. Mako split home games between Paradice Avondale and Paradice Botany.

=== Future expansion ===
Future expansion of the NZIHL is limited due to small number of ice rink facilities across the country. There is ongoing discussions regarding construction of new ice facilities in different parts of New Zealand. If any new facility is built, expansion of the NZIHL is likely. Despite having a regional association with the Federation, Wellington, the capital of New Zealand, does not have any ice sports facilities. This has meant the third largest city in the country is not represented in the NZIHL. In 2011, it was reported that the local Wellington City Council was considering options for building a permanent ice rink facility, while they agreed to a privately paid for temporary rink to be constructed on Wellington's waterfront at Queens Wharf to attract Rugby World Cup fans and holidaying school children for the Wintergarden event. In 2015, the Wellington Regional Multi-Purpose Sports and Recreational Ice Arena Trust was incorporated with a view of planning, constructing and operating a 2,500 seat ice sports facility in the Wellington region. The project was estimated to cost $11 million, with the Trust looking to sign an agreement with the Wellington City Council for the land and then raise funding for the project through donations, fundraising and loans. However, as of 2023, no proposed ice rink project has been completed in Wellington despite the popularity of the temporary ice rinks in the city over the years.

=== New Zealand-Australia interaction ===
With the NZIHL quality improving over the years, there has been talk of creating a combined Oceania competition that would see the New Zealand league merge with the Australian league, Australian Ice Hockey League (AIHL). In 2011 the AIHL Chairman Tyler Lovering confirmed talks had taken place with NZIHL General Manager Gunther Birgel regarding the prospect of New Zealand based teams joining the AIHL within the next three years.

While no combined league has been subsequently established yet, in 2011 the Australian and New Zealand leagues did agree to set-up the Trans-Tasman Champions League. The Champions League would see the top two teams from each league qualify and compete in a tournament to be crowned Trans-Tasman champions. The first and only edition of the Champions League was played in Melbourne in 2012 with Botany Swarm, Southern Stampede, Newcastle North Stars and Melbourne Ice competing. The NZIHL teams failed to win a game in the tournament, and while the second edition was scheduled to be played in Queenstown in 2013, the tournament was cancelled and never contested again.

Instead, the federations for Australia and New Zealand ice hockey favoured setting up more regular international series between the two countries, with the New Zealand Winter Games identified as a platform for the two national teams to come together and face-off regularly. The two nations have played together in series at the 2009, 2011, 2017, 2018 and 2019 New Zealand Winter Games.

In 2022, a new Australian based league was announced named the Pacific Hockey League (PHL). This new league identified expansion into New Zealand from its outset to create an Oceanian league connecting Australia and New Zealand. Rather than try and come to an agreement with the NZIHL and its member clubs, the PHL decided to establish a new team in Queenstown named the Queenstown Rush in 2022. It was intended that this new team would join the league in 2023, allowing sufficient lead time for the Rush to establish itself properly and get ready for competition. However, the Rush never got the opportunity to take part in the PHL, when in early 2023, the league announced it was ceasing operations.

Also in 2022, the Australian and New Zealand federations jointly announced a new concept of an All-Star match between the winners of the AIHL and NZIHL. It was the first time since the Champions League in 2012 that there was the prospect of the two leagues interacting with each other. The game would be scheduled after the completion of both league seasons in 2022. However, the all-star game concept was shelved and instead a new international series between Australia and New Zealand was announced in its place. The first series was played in Melbourne in October 2022 and the second series was played in Queenstown in March 2023.

== Season structure and rules ==
As per 2022.

=== Regular season ===
The NZIHL regular season is typically played between May and September each year. The regular season consists of 40 games in total, with each of the main five teams playing 16 games in a home and away round-robin season structure. Each team plays each other team four times, two at home and two away. The sixth team, Auckland Mako, are a U23 development team who play less games than the other five teams due to the varied nature of the team’s roster. Mako plays between four and ten games a season and are ineligible for the NZIHL finals. Because of this, Mako’s games do not count towards the NZIHL standings and player statistics are recorded separately from the rest of the league. The NZIHL regular season points system, follows similar systems widely used in Europe and Australian ice hockey leagues. 3 points is awarded for a regulation time win, 2 points for a shootout win, 1 point for a shootout loss and 0 points for a regulation time loss. In the unlikely event of a draw, both teams will be awarded 1 point each.

=== Game rules and governance ===
All games and NZIHL events are to be played in accordance to the rules set out in the NZIHL events manual, followed by the International Ice Hockey Federation Rule Book. The NZIHL has adopted the international standard three 20-minute stop-time regulation period length for all regular season and finals games. All regular season and finals overtime periods are five minutes long with golden goal rules (first to score wins). Where possible with ice rink facilities, and upon prior decision by the NZIHL General Manager, the three grand final games will implement a 3 on 3 single 20 minute overtime period followed by a shootout. Governance for the events manual falls to the NZIHL executive, headed by the General Manager (GM), and oversighted by the New Zealand Ice Hockey Federation (NZIHF) Management Committee. The NZIHL executive meet regularly with the NZIHF Management Committee, participate in NZIHF AGMs, prepare yearly budgets and write annual reports. All three NZIHF affiliated regions with NZIHL teams are evenly represented.

=== Roster & import rules ===
There are no maximum roster limits in the NZIHL. Players must be 16 years or older and registered with their regional association to play in the NZIHL. Female players are eligible to play as goaltenders. Mid-season player transfers between NZIHL teams are prohibited unless given special dispensation by the NZIHL General Manager. NZIHL players are broken up into two categories, regional players (New Zealand or Australian citizens) and import players (a citizen of any other country). This categorisation was updated in 2022 and replaced the old three category system of NZ player, naturalised player and import player, used prior to 2022. Import players and Australian citizens must have a cleared international transfer card (ITC) in order to be eligible to play an NZIHL game. There are no limits on the number of import players allowed on a team's roster, however there is a limit on the number of import players teams are allowed to dress for a game. As of 2022, four import players from each team (eight in total) are allowed to dress for any one game, with import goaltenders counting as two import players. The NZIHL covers the traveling costs of traveling teams up to 15 skaters, two goaltenders and five staff (22 in total). Any additional traveling players or staff need to be financial covered by the teams themselves.

Category	Eligibility and requirements
Regional player	All New Zealand or Australian citizens. Australian citizens require an approved international transfer card (ITC).
Import player	Anyone who does not qualify as a regional player. Must obtain an approved ITC with all IIHF fees paid.

=== Player status ===
Players in the NZIHL are amateur and are not paid to play. NZIHL teams are however allowed to assist with associated costs for players to play in the NZIHL, including: airfares, accommodation, transportation, food, international transfer card fees, registration fees, ice time fees, playing fees and equipment support. In addition, players may be paid reasonable rates for coaching ice hockey, with the rate no more than would be reasonable within the market for the services provided.

=== Playoffs ===
Playoffs in the NZIHL are called the Finals. The finals are played over two weekends with a best of 2 game semi-final series followed by a best of 3 game grand finals series. The top three teams from the regular season qualify for the finals. The top placed team qualifies automatically for the grand final series. The second and third placed teams qualify for the semi-final series. The winner of the semi-final series advances to the grand final series. The top placed team hosts the grand final series at their home venue. The second placed team hosts the semi-finals series at their home venue.

=== Previous season structures ===
Previously, the NZIHL has had a number of different season structures since foundation in 2005.

Former season structures
Years active	Structure changes
2005–06	In the first two seasons, there was no preliminary round and the regular season consisted of four rounds and a total of 12 games. Each of the four teams played six games, two against each opponent. Each round was hosted by one of the teams, with two teams traveling and one team getting a bye. The top two teams in the league standings at the end of the regular season would qualify for the two game finals series. If both teams won a game each, the winner would be decided on which team had the superior goal difference in those two games, followed by which team scored the most goals, followed by regular season results between the two teams.
2007	In the third season of the NZIHL, the regular season and finals format was changed. Two preliminary rounds were introduced to promote local rivalries. The four teams would play their local rival six times in the season and the other two teams twice. The rivalry groupings were split into North and South Island. The Swarm and Admirals, both based in Auckland, was one rivalry group and the Red Devils and Stampede was the other. In the two preliminary rounds, the local rivals would face off twice per round on Saturday and Sundays. Wins in this round were worth two points and draws were worth one point. In the regular rounds, each team hosted one round for a total of four rounds, like in the first two seasons, with two traveling teams and one team getting a bye. The three competing teams each round would play two games between Friday-Sunday. Wins in these four rounds were worth four points and draws worth two points. The top two teams at the conclusion of the regular season qualified for the finals. Rather than a two game series, the NZIHL changed the finals to become a one game winner takes all grand final. The team who finished top of the league season standings was awarded home ice advantage for the grand final.
2008–13	With the NZIHL expanding to five teams, with the inclusion of the Dunedin Thunder, the format of the regular season changed in 2008 and was maintained through to the 2013 season. The regular season format ditched the round hosting schedule and the rivals groupings and moved to a round-robin each team playing each other team four times a season. The Finals remained a single game winner takes all game hosted by the league premiers, first introduced in 2007.
2014–17	During this four season period, the regular season format established in 2008 was maintained, however, the finals format was altered with the re-introduction of a series format. Unlike in the first two seasons, the new series format would be a best of three game series between the league premiers and second place team from the regular season. The team who finished second in the regular season would host the first game of the finals series. The league premier would then host the following game and if needed the third game. If a third game was needed a compensation scheme was established by the NZIHL so the profits could be shared between the two teams.
2018–19	The league expanded the finals format with the introduction of a second weekend and a single-game semi-final game. Qualification for finals increased from two teams to three, with the third placed team in the league standings qualifying for finals for the first time. The second and third placed teams would contest the semi-final game, with the league premier qualifying for the grand final series automatically. The winner of the semi-final game would advance to the grand final series.

== League champions and premiers ==
=== NZIHL champions and premiers by seasons (2005–present) ===
Season-by-season Championships and Premierships
Year	NZIHL Championships				NZIHL Premierships	
Year	(gold) Champions	Score(s)	(silver) Finalists	Venue(s)	Premiers	Runners-up
2005	Southern Stampede	2–1, 6–3	West Auckland Admirals	Dunedin	Southern Stampede	West Auckland Admirals
2006	Southern Stampede	3–3, 5–4	South Auckland Swarm	Botany Downs	South Auckland Swarm	Southern Stampede
2007	Botany Swarm	7–0	Canterbury Red Devils	Christchurch	Canterbury Red Devils	Botany Swarm
2008	Botany Swarm	3–2	Canterbury Red Devils	Christchurch	Canterbury Red Devils	Botany Swarm
2009	Canterbury Red Devils	5–4	Southern Stampede	Christchurch	Canterbury Red Devils	Southern Stampede
2010	Botany Swarm	3–1	West Auckland Admirals	Botany Downs	Botany Swarm	West Auckland Admirals
2011	Botany Swarm	5–3	Southern Stampede	Botany Downs	Botany Swarm	Southern Stampede
2012	Canterbury Red Devils	6–5 (SO)	Southern Stampede	Queenstown	Southern Stampede	Canterbury Red Devils
2013	Canterbury Red Devils	7–3	Dunedin Thunder	Dunedin	Dunedin Thunder	Canterbury Red Devils
2014	Canterbury Red Devils	4–3, 14–6	Dunedin Thunder	Dunedin, Christchurch	Canterbury Red Devils	Dunedin Thunder
2015	Southern Stampede	3–5, 4–3, 4–3	Canterbury Red Devils	Christchurch, Queenstown	Southern Stampede	Canterbury Red Devils
2016	Skycity Stampede	6–2, 7–1	Canterbury Red Devils	Christchurch, Queenstown	Skycity Stampede	Canterbury Red Devils
2017	Skycity Stampede	5–2, 5–2	West Auckland Admirals	Avondale, Queenstown	Skycity Stampede	West Auckland Admirals
2018	West Auckland Admirals	5–4 (OT), 2–1	Skycity Stampede	Avondale, Queenstown	Skycity Stampede	West Auckland Admirals
2019	Skycity Stampede	8–4, 6–2	West Auckland Admirals	Avondale, Queenstown	Skycity Stampede	Botany Swarm
2020–21 seasons cancelled due to COVID-19 pandemic. The Birgel Cup was not awarded. Skycity Stampede and West Auckland Admirals won Northern and Southern Showdown tournaments in 2020.
2022	Skycity Stampede	4–3, 2–1	West Auckland Admirals	Avondale	West Auckland Admirals	Skycity Stampede
2023	Skycity Stampede	6–5, 5–2	Botany Swarm	Queenstown	Skycity Stampede	Botany Swarm
2024	Skycity Stampede	2-1, 4-0	West Auckland Admirals	Queenstown	Skycity Stampede	Botany Swarm
2025	Skycity Stampede	8-2, 6-3	Botany Swarm	Botany Downs	Botany Swarm	Skycity Stampede
2026	Skycity Stampede	4-6, 6-2, 6-2	Dunedin Thunder	Queenstown	Skycity Stampede	Dunedin Thunder

=== NZIHL champions all-time record ===
All-time Championships
Team	# Titles	Years
Botany Swarm	4	2007, 2008, 2010, 2011
Canterbury Red Devils	4	2009, 2012, 2013, 2014
Skycity Stampede	11	2005, 2006, 2015, 2016, 2017, 2019, 2022, 2023, 2024, 2025, 2026
West Auckland Admirals	1	2018

== League trophies ==
=== Birgel Cup ===
The Birgel cup is the principle trophy in New Zealand ice hockey named after Gunther Birgel, founder of NZ ice hockey league . It is the NZIHL championship trophy and was first awarded in 2010, when it replaced the original NZIHL Trophy. The Birgel Cup is given to the winner of the NZIHL Finals series at the conclusion of the NZIHL season.

=== Toa Kauhanga Riri Tio ===
The Toa Kauhanga Riri Tio challenge trophy (TKRT) was introduced in the 2012 season. The Māori trophy name translates to "champions of the ice battlefield" and was designed and built by Wellington craftsman Mark Newnham. The premise of the trophy is loosely based on the Ranfurly Shield challenge system. The TKRT is contested during each NZIHL regular season. The current holders of the Riri Tio must defend the trophy on home ice in the second game of each round. The Auckland Mako are not entitled to challenge for the trophy and the TKRT was not challenged in 2020 due to the COVID-19 pandemic.

Year	Holder	Challenger	Winner	Score	Venue
2012	Dunedin Thunder	West Auckland Admirals	West Auckland Admirals	4–7	Dunedin
2012	West Auckland Admirals	Canterbury Red Devils	Canterbury Red Devils	6–7	Avondale, Auckland
2012	Canterbury Red Devils	West Auckland Admirals	Canterbury Red Devils	7–5	Christchurch
2012	Canterbury Red Devils	Dunedin Thunder	Canterbury Red Devils	9–4	Christchurch
2012	Canterbury Red Devils	Southern Stampede	Southern Stampede	2–6	Christchurch
2013	Southern Stampede	West Auckland Admirals	Southern Stampede	6–5	Queenstown
2013	Southern Stampede	Canterbury Red Devils	Canterbury Red Devils	5–6 (OT)	Queenstown
2013	Canterbury Red Devils	West Auckland Admirals	Canterbury Red Devils	12–2	Christchurch
2013	Canterbury Red Devils	Southern Stampede	Canterbury Red Devils	3–1	Christchurch
2014	Canterbury Red Devils	Southern Stampede	Canterbury Red Devils	4–2	Christchurch
2014	Canterbury Red Devils	West Auckland Admirals	Canterbury Red Devils	8–6	Christchurch
2014	Canterbury Red Devils	Botany Swarm	Botany Swarm	3–4 (SO)	Christchurch
2014	Botany Swarm	Canterbury Red Devils	Canterbury Red Devils	1–5	Botany Downs, Auckland
2014	Canterbury Red Devils	Dunedin Thunder	Canterbury Red Devils	6–0	Christchurch
2015	Canterbury Red Devils	West Auckland Admirals	Canterbury Red Devils	7–6	Christchurch
2015	Canterbury Red Devils	Southern Stampede	Canterbury Red Devils	4–3 (OT)	Christchurch
2015	Canterbury Red Devils	Botany Swarm	Botany Swarm	4–5 (OT)	Christchurch
2015	Botany Swarm	West Auckland Admirals	West Auckland Admirals	2–3 (OT)	Botany Downs, Auckland
2016	West Auckland Admirals	Botany Swarm	Botany Swarm	4–5 (OT)	Avondale, Auckland
2016	Botany Swarm	Canterbury Red Devils	Canterbury Red Devils	3–4	Botany Downs, Auckland
2016	Canterbury Red Devils	West Auckland Admirals	West Auckland Admirals	3–7	Christchurch
2016	West Auckland Admirals	Dunedin Thunder	West Auckland Admirals	8–2	Avondale, Auckland
2016	West Auckland Admirals	Skycity Stampede	West Auckland Admirals	5–3	Avondale, Auckland
2017	West Auckland Admirals	Botany Swarm	West Auckland Admirals	14–0	Avondale, Auckland
2017	West Auckland Admirals	Canterbury Red Devils	West Auckland Admirals	8–2	Avondale, Auckland
2017	West Auckland Admirals	Skycity Stampede	Skycity Stampede	3–5	Avondale, Auckland
2017	Skycity Stampede	Dunedin Thunder	Skycity Stampede	6–2	Queenstown
2017	Skycity Stampede	West Auckland Admirals	Skycity Stampede	5–3	Queenstown
2018	Skycity Stampede	Dunedin Thunder	Dunedin Thunder	3–4	Queenstown
2018	Dunedin Thunder	Canterbury Red Devils	Dunedin Thunder	6–1	Dunedin
2018	Dunedin Thunder	Skycity Stampede	Skycity Stampede	4–5	Dunedin
2019	Skycity Stampede	Dunedin Thunder	Skycity Stampede	6–2	Queenstown
2019	Skycity Stampede	Botany Swarm	Skycity Stampede	4–2	Queenstown
2019	Skycity Stampede	West Auckland Admirals	Skycity Stampede	3–2	Queenstown
2019	Skycity Stampede	Canterbury Red Devils	Skycity Stampede	7–2	Queenstown
Not contested in 2020 due to the COVID-19 pandemic.
2021	Skycity Stampede	Canterbury Red Devils	Skycity Stampede	10–2	Queenstown
2021	Skycity Stampede	West Auckland Admirals	Skycity Stampede	4–3	Queenstown
2021	Skycity Stampede	Phoenix Thunder	Skycity Stampede	6–0	Queenstown
2022	Skycity Stampede	Phoenix Thunder	Skycity Stampede	6–2	Queenstown
2022	Skycity Stampede	Botany Swarm	Skycity Stampede	4–0	Queenstown
2022	Skycity Stampede	Canterbury Red Devils	Canterbury Red Devils	3–4	Queenstown
2022	Canterbury Red Devils	Botany Swarm	Canterbury Red Devils	7–3	Christchurch
2023	Canterbury Red Devils	Botany Swarm	Botany Swarm	3–4	Christchurch
2023	Botany Swarm	Canterbury Red Devils	Botany Swarm	4–0	Botany Downs, Auckland
2023	Botany Swarm	Skycity Stampede	Botany Swarm	6–3	Botany Downs, Auckland
2023	Botany Swarm	West Auckland Admirals	Botany Swarm	6–4	Botany Downs, Auckland
2024	Botany Swarm	Phoenix Thunder	Botany Swarm	6–4	Botany Downs, Auckland
2024	Botany Swarm	Skycity Stampede	TBD	TBD	Botany Downs, Auckland

End of season holder

==== Former trophies ====
===== NZIHL Trophy =====
The NZIHL Trophy was the original championship trophy for the NZIHL. It was awarded five times between 2005 and 2009 before being replaced by the Birgel Cup. The Southern Stampede and Botany Swarm lifted the NZIHL trophy an equal record times, winning the trophy twice each. Canterbury Red Devils was the only other team to lift the trophy, winning the final trophy in 2009.

===== Glass Family Shield =====
The Glass Family Shield was awarded annually to the winner of the Skate Of Origin series between its inception in 2009 and conclusion in 2016. The shield was named after the South Island Glass family who were leaders and builder of the sport of ice hockey within New Zealand over the course of three generations. Ben Glass is a founding member of the NZIHF and patron of the Southern Ice Hockey League (SIHL). Graeme Glass is the past president of the NZIHF and inducted life member. While Simon Glass, Ben Lewis & Hamish Lewis have all previously represented New Zealand at international level with the Ice Blacks, with Simon also captaining the national team. In addition, Annabelle Lewis also represented the New Zealand women's national team, the Ice Fernz.

Skate Of Origin was introduced in 2009 and ran from 2009 to 2016. The series was used as an All-star game and often a national team selection process. The format saw the best players eligible to represent New Zealand at an international level play for the respective island on which they played their junior hockey. Players represented one of the two major islands of the New Zealand archipelago, namely the North Island or the South Island. The host of the Origin alternated each season with the North Island hosting the inaugural Skate of Origin at Paradice Botany Downs. Throughout the history of the Origin, the North Island won the series and lifted the Glass Family Shield five times compared to the South Island's three times.

Year	Holder	Challenger	Winner	Score	Host
2009	N/A	N/A	North Island	6–5 (SO)	Botany Downs, North Island
2010	North Island	South Island	North Island	3–2	Queenstown, South Island
2011	North Island	South Island	North Island	8–6	Botany Downs, North Island
2012	North Island	South Island	South Island	5–3	Christchurch, South Island
2013	South Island	North Island	South Island	6–5	Botany Downs, North Island
2014	South Island	North Island	South Island	6–4	Dunedin, South Island
2015	South Island	North Island	North Island	9–7	Queenstown, South Island
2016	North Island	South Island	North Island	2–1 (SO)	Avondale, North Island

===== Trans-Tasman Trophy =====
The Trans-Tasman Trophy was the championship trophy for the winner of the Trans-Tasman Champions League (TTCL). Established in 2012 as a joint venture between the New Zealand Ice Hockey League and the Australian Ice Hockey League, the TTCL was created to expand relations, cooperation and competition between the top ice hockey leagues of Australia and New Zealand. The TTCL was designed to be an annual event played over a single weekend with the host alternating between New Zealand and Australia. The champions and premiers of both the NZIHL and AIHL would qualify for the Champions League and would play each team from the other league twice over the weekend. The first, and so far only edition, of the Trans-Tasman Champions League, saw the NZIHL send the Botany Swarm and Southern Stampede to travel to Melbourne to contest the Champions League for the right to lift the Trans-Tasman Trophy. AIHL team, Melbourne Ice won the 2012 TTCL, with the NZIHL teams failing to win a game.

In 2013, the second edition of the tournament was intended to be played in New Zealand but costs prevented the AIHL sending any teams and the Champions League was cancelled. In 2016, there was discussions to revive the TTCL with the champions of the NZIHL and AIHL playing in a 3 game series in New Zealand, but the NZIHF and IHA decided an international series between the Ice Blacks and Mighty Roos would be better, with a view to return to the Trans-Tasman Champions League and Trans-Tasman Trophy sometime in the future.

Year	Winner	Runner-up	Other competitors	Host
2012	Melbourne Ice	Newcastle North Stars	Botany Swarm, Southern Stampede	Melbourne, Australia

== See also ==
- New Zealand Ice Hockey Federation
- New Zealand national ice hockey team
- Australian Ice Hockey League
