= 2007 NZIHL season =

== 2007 NZIHL Standings ==
Position	Team	GP	PRW	PRL	W	L	T	PTS	GF	GA
1	Canterbury Red Devils	10	2	2	5	0	1	26	63	37
2	Botany Swarm	10	4	0	4	1	1	26	44	28
3	Southern Stampede	10	2	2	2	4	0	12	42	53
4	West Auckland Admirals	10	0	4	0	6	0	0	29	60

PRW = Preliminary Round Win = 2 points
PRL = Preliminary Round Loss
W = Main Round Win = 4 points
L = Main Round Loss
T = Main Round Tie = 2 points

- NB - Canterbury Red Devils qualify top over the Botany Swarm after recording a win and tie in the 2 regular season games played between the 2 teams.

== 2007 Season Results ==
Preliminary Rounds

Round 1

Dunedin

May 25, 2007 - Southern Stampede 2 v Canterbury Red Devils 9

May 26, 2007 - Southern Stampede 4 v Canterbury Red Devils 3

Avondale

May 26, 2007 - West Auckland Admirals 4 v Botany Swarm 6

May 27, 2007 - West Auckland Admirals 3 v Botany Swarm 7

Round 2

Christchurch

June 9, 2007 - Canterbury Red Devils 10 v Southern Stampede 5

June 10, 2007 - Canterbury Red Devils 2 v Southern Stampede 6

Botany Downs

June 9, 2007 - Botany Swarm 3 v West Auckland Admirals 2

June 10, 2007 - Botany Swarm 2 v West Auckland Admirals 1

Main Rounds

Round 3 - Queenstown

June 29, 2007 - Southern Stampede 2 v Botany Swarm 3

June 30, 2007 - Southern Stampede 2 v Canterbury Red Devils 8

July 1, 2007 - Canterbury Red Devils 3 v Botany Swarm 3

Round 4 - Botany Downs

July 13, 2007 - West Auckland Admirals 4 v Canterbury Red Devils 8

July 14, 2007 - Botany Swarm 4 v Canterbury Red Devils 6

July 15, 2007 - Botany Swarm 5 v West Auckland Admirals 4

Round 5 - Christchurch

July 27, 2007 - Southern Stampde 10 v West Auckland Admirals 2

July 28, 2007 - Canterbury Red Devils 7 v Southern Stampede 4

July 29, 2007 - Canterbury Red Devils 7 v West Auckland Admirals 3

Round 6 - Avondale

August 10, 2007 - Botany Swarm 5 v Southern Stampede 1

August 11, 2007 - West Auckland Admirals 4 v Southern Stampede 6

August 12, 2007 - West Auckland Admirals 2 v Botany Swarm 6

Final - Christchurch

September 8, 2007 - Canterbury Red Devils 0 v Botany Swarm 7

== 2007 Leading Scorers ==
Player	Team	GP	G	A	P
Janos Kaszala	Canterbury Red Devils	10	11	12	23
Jesper Danielsson	Canterbury Red Devils	10	9	13	22
Lukas Kavka	Canterbury Red Devils	10	10	6	16
Amadeus Schifferle	Southern Stampede	10	8	7	15
Daniel Smith	West Auckland Admirals	10	9	5	14

== 2007 NZIHL Awards ==
MVP of Canterbury Red Devils - Janos Kaszala

MVP of Botany Swarm - Ian Wannamaker

MVP of Southern Stampede - Brett Speirs

MVP of West Auckland Admirals - Rick Parry

Best Defenceman - Hayden Argyle - Canterbury Red Devils

Top Goaltender - Zak Nothling - Botany Swarm

Top Points Scorer - Janos Kaszala - Canterbury Red Devils

League MVP - Janos Kaszala - Canterbury Red Devils

Top Rookie - Dale Harrop - Canterbury Red Devils

Finals MVP - Charlie Huber - Botany Swarm
