= 2006 NZIHL season =

Sports season

== 2006 NZIHL Standings ==
Position	Team	GP	W	L	T	BP	PTS	GF	GA
1	South Auckland Swarm	6	5	1	0	0	15	25	17
2	Southern Stampede	6	4	2	0	1	13	25	19
3	Canterbury Red Devils	6	1	4	1	4	9	22	26
4	West Auckland Admirals	6	1	4	1	2	7	17	27

W = Main Round Win = 3 points
L = Main Round Loss
T = Main Round Tie = 2 points
BP = Bonus Point = 1 point

== 2006 Season Results ==
Round 1- Avondale

June 9, 2006 - South Auckland Swarm 5 v Canterbury Red Devils 4

June 10, 2006 - West Auckland Admirals 5 v Canterbury Red Devils 3

June 11, 2006 - South Auckland Swarm 3 v West Auckland Admirals 2

Round 2 - Queenstown

June 30, 2006 - Southern Stampede 6 v Canterbury Red Devils 4

July 1, 2006 - Southern Stampede 6 v West Auckland Admirals 3

July 2, 2006 - Canterbury Red Devils 4 v West Auckland Admirals 4

Round 3 - Christchurch

July 21, 2006 - Southern Stampede 7 v South Auckland Swarm 2

July 22, 2006 - Canterbury Red Devils 3 v Southern Stampede 1

July 23, 2006 - Canterbury Red Devils 4 v South Auckland Swarm 5

Round 4 - Botany Downs

August 11, 2006 - West Auckland Admirals 3 v Southern Stampede 5

August 12, 2006 - South Auckland Swarm 4 v Southern Stampede 0

August 13, 2006 - South Auckland Swarm 6 v West Auckland Admirals 0

Finals - Botany Downs

September 9, 2006 - South Auckland Swarm 3 v Southern Stampede 3

September 10, 2006 - South Auckland Swarm 4 v Southern Stampede 5

2006 NZIHL Champion - Southern Stampede

== 2006 Leading Scorers ==
Player	Team	GP	G	A	P
Jeff Bonazzo	West Auckland Admirals	6	5	6	11
Lukas Kavka	Canterbury Red Devils	6	6	4	10
Charlie Huber	South Auckland Swarm	5	5	4	9
Daniel Smith	West Auckland Admirals	6	5	4	9
Brett Speirs	Southern Stampede	6	5	3	8

== 2006 NZIHL Awards ==
MVP of Canterbury Red Devils - Andreas Ericsson

MVP of South Auckland Swarm - Mike Lawrie

MVP of Southern Stampede - Brett Speirs

MVP of West Auckland Admirals - Jeff Bonazzo

Best Defenceman - BJ Lang - Southern Stampede

Top Goaltender - Greg Davies - West Auckland Admirals

Top Points Scorer - Jeff Bonazzo - West Auckland Admirals

League MVP - Jeff Bonazzo - West Auckland Admirals

Top Rookie - Martin Lee - South Auckland Swarm

Finals MVP - Loren Nowland - Southern Stampede & Joshua Hay - South Auckland Swarm
