= Canterbury Red Devils =

Ice hockey team in Christchurch, New Zealand

- City: Christchurch
- League: New Zealand Ice Hockey League
- Founded: 2005
- Operated: 2005–present
- Home arena: Alpine Ice Sports Centre
- Colours: Red, white, black
- General manager: (New Zealand) Graham Tappin
- Head coach: (New Zealand) Anton Purver
- Captain: (New Zealand) Shaun Brown
- Website: reddevils.co.nz

Championships
- Regular season titles: 4 (2007, 2008, 2009, 2014)
- NZIHL Champion: 4 (2009, 2012, 2013, 2014)

The Canterbury Red Devils is an ice hockey team based in Christchurch, New Zealand, and are members of the New Zealand Ice Hockey League. The club plays their home games at the Alpine Ice Centre. Since their foundation in 2005 the team have won both the regular season title and the playoffs on four occasions with their most recent coming in the 2014 NZIHL season.

== History ==
The Canterbury Red Devils were founded in 2005 and joined the New Zealand Ice Hockey League (NZIHL) for its inaugural season. In their debut season the Red Devils finished the regular season in last place and failed to qualify for the playoffs. They again missed the playoffs in 2006 after finishing third in the standings. In 2007 the Red Devils won their first regular season title, edging out the Botany Swarm on goal difference. The team advanced to their first finals appearance however lost to the Swarm. The Red Devils won their second regular season title in 2008 however, went on to lose to the Swarm in the final. In 2009 the team won their third straight regular season title and advanced to the final against the Southern Stampede. The Red Devils defeated the Stampede to claim their first playoffs title. The 2010 and 2011 seasons saw the Red Devils finish the regular season in third place, losing out to the second placed team only on head-to-head win ratio. The team returned to the playoffs in 2012, winning their second playoffs title after defeating the Stampede in the final. The Red Devils went on to win the 2013 and 2014 playoffs, defeating the Dunedin Thunder in both finals and also claiming their fourth regular season title in 2014. Following their 2014 playoffs win the Red Devils became the first NZIHL club to claim three titles in a row. The 2015 season saw the Red Devils finish the regular season in second place and lose to the Stampede in the finals.

== Season-by-season results ==
Season	GP	W	OTW	T	OTL	L	GF	GA	PTS	Regular Season Finish	Playoff Result	Ref
2005	6	0	–	0	–	6	17	38	2	4th	Did not qualify	
2006	6	1	–	1	–	4	22	26	9	3rd	Did not qualify	
2007	10	7	–	1	–	2	63	37	26	1st	Lost final (Botany Swarm)	
2008	12	9	–	2	–	1	93	48	32	1st	Lost final (Botany Swarm)	
2009	16	14	–	0	–	2	133	35	28	1st	Won final (Southern Stampede)	
2010	16	8	0	–	2	6	92	75	26	3rd	Did not qualify	
2011	16	10	1	–	1	4	77	62	33	3rd	Did not qualify	
2012	16	7	3	–	2	4	80	68	29	2nd	Won final (Southern Stampede)	
2013	16	9	2	–	1	4	93	63	32	2nd	Won final (Dunedin Thunder)	
2014	16	12	0	–	1	3	79	58	37	1st	Won final (Dunedin Thunder)	
2015	16	9	1	–	2	4	96	64	31	2nd	Lost final (Southern Stampede)	
2016	16	9	1	–	1	5	85	79	30	2nd	Lost final (Southern Stampede)	
2017	16	2	1	–	1	12	51	127	9	5th	Did not qualify	
2018	16	1	1	–	0	14	58	125	5	5th	Did not qualify	
2019	16	2	0	–	1	13	33	96	7	5th	Did not qualify	
2020	8	1	0	–	0	7	26	68	3	3rd	Playoffs not held	
2021	16	2	1	–	1	12	56	109	9	5th	Playoffs cancelled	
2022	16	7	2	–	0	7	62	60	25	3rd	Lost semifinal (West Auckland Admirals)	
2023	16	3	1	–	3	9	60	82	14	4th	Did not qualify	
2024	16	2	1	–	2	11	53	115	10	4th	Did not qualify	
2025	16	0	0	–	0	16	46	104	0	5th	Did not qualify	

== NZIHL Awards ==
- NZIHL champions 2009, 2012, 2013, 2014
- NZIHL Minor Premiership: 2007, 2008, 2009, 2014
- Toa Kauhunga Riri Tio: New Zealand Ice Hockey League#Toa Kauhanga Riri Tio
- NZIHL Finals MVP: Justin Findlay (2009), Valeri Konev (2012), Takumi Ledbetter (2013), Dale Harrop (2014)
- NZIHL League MVP: Janos Kaszala (2007), Chris Eaden (2009, 2012, 2022)
- NZIHL Rookie of the year: Dale Harrop (2007), Dan Nicholls (2008), Ryan Ruddle (2009), Jerreau Hohaia (2011), Jake Ratcliffe (2013), Jacob Carey (2021), Lachlan Hodge (2023)
- NZIHL Top Scorer: Janos Kaszala (2007, 2008), Chris Eaden (2009, 2010, 2011, 2012, 2022)
- NZIHL Best Goaltender: Justin Findlay (2009), Michael Coleman (2014)
- NZIHL Best Defenceman: Hayden Argyle (2007), Mitchell Oak (2010), Dan Nicholls (2011), Terry Watt (2013)
- Team MVP - Canterbury Red Devils: Troy Crittenden (2005), Andreas Ericcson (2006), Janos Kaszala (2007, 2008), Paris Heyd (2009), Justin Findlay (2010), Kyle Papai (2011), James Kirkwood (2012), Brett Spiers (2013), Chris Eaden (2014, 2017), Dean Tonks (2015), James Archer (2016), Jaxson Lane (2018), Adam Goss (2019), Petr Pospisil (2021), Joe Orr (2022), Dan Nicholls (2023)

== Players and personnel ==
=== Current roster ===
Team roster for the 2026 NZIHL season

Canterbury Red Devils roster - 2026 NZIHL season
Active roster		Coaching staff
Goaltenders: 23 (England) Daniel Reason; 52 (New Zealand) Niall Fanning; 91 (New Zealand) Lucas Duggan; 91 (New Zealand) Timothy Carey; Defencemen: 3 (New Zealand) Aaron Byfield; 8 (New Zealand) Shaun Brown (C); 11 (New Zealand) George Hopkins; 22 (New Zealand) Luke Tappin (A); 24 (New Zealand) Joshua Louw; 29 (United States) Micah Clark (I); 42 (Russia) Shamil Daudov; 55 (New Zealand) Logan Willis; - (Republic of Ireland) Craig Hayes	Forwards: 4 (New Zealand) Jack Barton; 7 (New Zealand) Garth Henare; 10 (New Zealand) Harry Campbell; 12 (Canada) Mikael Guerin; 13 (New Zealand) Jaan Turia; 15 (England) Nicky Dodwell; 16 (New Zealand) Timothy Thomas; 21 (United States) Michael Morrissey (I); 27 (New Zealand) Mason Rees (A); 28 (New Zealand) Joel Keogh-Cope; 44 (New Zealand) Peter Zhang; 48 (Estonia) Fabian Hast (I); 71 (New Zealand) Seamus Gallagher; 75 (New Zealand) Kieran Higgins; 77 (New Zealand) Eli Seo Jun Paek; 81 (New Zealand) Harry Louw; 88 (Canada) Alex Gagnon (I); 93 (New Zealand) Haydn Boul; 95 (United States) Caleb Hance (AF); 96 (New Zealand) Oliver Carian; - (New Zealand) Jacob Wallace	Head Coach: (New Zealand) Anton Purver; Coaches: (New Zealand) Ivar Hoglund (AC); (New Zealand) Micheal Atkinson (TM); Legend (C) Captain (A) Alternate Captain (I) Import player (AF) Affiliate player
Last updated on: 19 July 2026
Elite Prospects NZIHL

=== Team captains ===
- Hayden Argyle, 2012–2015
- James Archer, 2016
- Chris Eaden, 2017

=== Head coaches ===
- Jonathon Whitehead, 2010
- János Kaszala, 2011
- Anatoli Khorozov, 2012–2013
- Stacey Rout, 2014
- Anatoli Khorozov, 2015
- Matthew Sandford, 2016–2017
- Anatoli Khorozov, 2018

=== General managers ===
- Jake Lane, 2012–2015
- Martin Jeffreys, 2016
- Sherry Peck, 2017
- Jake Lane, 2018
