= Alpine Ice Centre =

Public ice sports venue in Christchurch, New Zealand

Alpine Ice
- Interactive map of Alpine Ice
- Location: 495 Brougham Street, Opawa, Christchurch, New Zealand, 8023
- Coordinates: 43.548359°S 172.657662°E
- Capacity: 700
- Surface: Ice – 56 m × 26 m (184 ft × 85 ft)

Construction
- Opened: 30 April 1985 (41 years ago)
- Renovated: May 1993 (33 years ago); New roof installed

Tenants
- Canterbury Red Devils (2005–present); Canterbury Inferno (2014–present)

Website
- www.alpineice.co.nz

Alpine Ice (also known as Alpine Ice Sports Centre) is an indoor ice sports and public skate centre, that opened in April 1985. It is located in the New Zealand city of Christchurch, in the inner-city suburb of Opawa. It is the current home venue of the Canterbury Red Devils in the New Zealand Ice Hockey League (NZIHL) and Canterbury Inferno in the New Zealand Women's Ice Hockey League (NZWIHL). The arena is the only operational indoor ice sports centre in Christchurch.

== History ==
=== Christchurch ice rink history ===
The first indoor ice rink in Christchurch was opened in 1952. Known as Centaurus Road Ice Rink, the venue was located in the southern-Christchurch suburb of Cashmere. The ice rink was owned by Mr. A F W Jones and the brothers Mr. Frank and Mr. George Kirkpatrick (Ice Rinks Chch Ltd). In 1953, the Centaurus Ice Skating Club was formed to utilise the facility along with the general public. On 5 July 1953, the ice rink was badly damaged by a fire but was repaired and remained operational. In 1978, the ownership and operation of the ice rink changed hands, with Mr. Jaap de Haan purchasing the venue. The early to mid-1980s saw the ageing Centaurus Road Ice Rink hit tough times, first closing in 1983, before ceasing all operations in September 1984 and being demolished in March 1985.

=== Foundation of Alpine Ice ===
In 1983 work commenced on the construction of a new and modern international-sized ice rink facility located at Opawa. The new rink, was bought by a company that included the current owner of the facility and was officially opened in April 1985 under the name of The Big Apple Ice Rink. In August 1992, Christchurch suffered a major snow storm. This storm was the largest snowstorm to hit Christchurch in 30 years. The Alpine Ice Centre suffered major damage during the storm, with the roof of the facility collapsing. Reconstruction of the roof took nine months, with the ice rink closed for this time and re-opened in May 1993. As of 2024, the arena employs 30 people, including full-time and part-time employees.

== Facilities ==
The arena's facilities were built between 1983 and 1985 and have been gradually updated with the last major upgrade coming in 2009. They include:

- 56 m × 26 m ice rink (international sized)
- 700 spectator capacity
- Skate and equipment hire
- Café
- Snack bar
- Pro-shop
- Private lounge
- Public toilets
- Outdoor parking

== Events ==
The arena hosts public skating and holiday events on a regular and seasonal basis. Alpine Ice hosts regular community-level ice sporting events for ice hockey, speed skating, and figure skating with a number of associated clubs, such as Canterbury Ice Hockey Association, Canterbury Alpine Ice Speed Skating Club, Canterbury Masters Figure Skating Club and Centaurus Ice Skating Club, using the venue. The arena also hosts national level ice hockey games during the NZIHL and NZWIHL seasons.

== See also ==
- List of ice rinks in New Zealand
- Sport in New Zealand
