= Dunedin Thunder =

Ice hockey team in Dunedin, New Zealand

- City: Dunedin
- League: New Zealand Ice Hockey League
- Founded: 2008
- Operated: 2008–present
- Home arena: Dunedin Ice Stadium
- Colours: Green, yellow, white, black
- Head coach: (France) Guillaume Leclancher
- Captain: (New Zealand) Regan Wilson
- Website: www.dunedinthunder.co.nz

Championships
- Regular season titles: 1 (2013)
- NZIHL Champion: 0

The Dunedin Thunder, also known as the Phoenix Thunder for sponsoship reasons is a men's ice hockey team based in Dunedin, New Zealand, and are members of the New Zealand Ice Hockey League. The club plays their home games at the Dunedin Ice Stadium. The Thunder were founded in 2008 and joined the league as an expansion team. The club won their first regular season title in 2013 and have finished as runner-up in the playoffs in 2013, 2014, and 2026.

== History ==
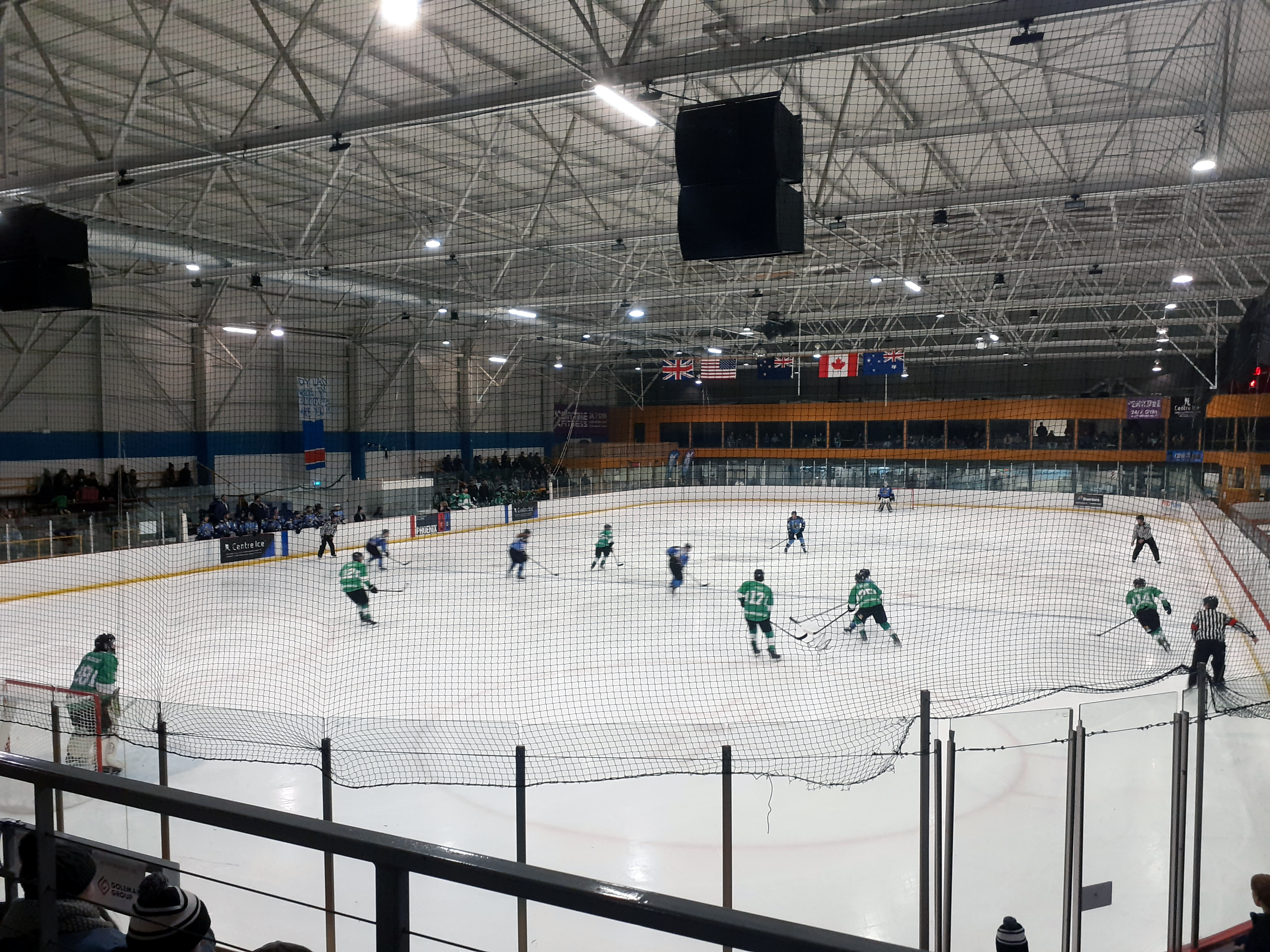
The Dunedin Thunder playing against the West Auckland Admirals, July 2021

The Dunedin Thunder were founded in 2008 and joined the New Zealand Ice Hockey League, expanding the league to five teams. In their debut season the Thunder finished the regular season in last place, managing only one win from their 12 games. The team repeated their last place finish in the 2009 season, again finishing the season with only a single win. The Thunder improved from 2010 to 2012, finishing the regular season in fourth on two occasions and third in the 2012 season. In 2013 the Thunder claimed their first regular season title after finishing on 32 points and edging out the Canterbury Red Devils only on win percentage. The team advanced to the final against the Red Devils however lost the game 3–7. The following season the Thunder returned to the finals after finishing the regular season in second place. The team however went on to lose for the second year in a row to the Red Devils. In the 2015 season the Thunder finished the regular season in fourth place and failed to qualify for the playoffs.

== Season-by-season results ==
Season	GP	W	OTW	T	OTL	L	GF	GA	PTS	Finish	Playoff	Ref
2008	12	1	–	0	–	11	30	91	4	5th	Did not qualify	
2009	16	1	–	0	–	15	42	142	2	5th	Did not qualify	
2010	16	3	4	–	1	8	71	84	18	4th	Did not qualify	
2011	16	3	2	–	0	11	78	108	13	4th	Did not qualify	
2012	16	8	1	–	2	5	77	65	28	3rd	Did not qualify	
2013	16	8	4	–	0	4	87	66	32	1st	Lost final (Canterbury Red Devils)	
2014	16	10	0	–	1	5	72	67	31	2nd	Lost final (Canterbury Red Devils)	
2015	16	5	0	–	0	11	66	108	15	4th	Did not qualify	
2016	16	2	0	–	0	14	44	94	6	5th	Did not qualify	
2017	16	6	3	–	0	7	73	60	24	3rd	Did not qualify	
2018	16	6	1	–	1	8	72	73	21	3rd	Did not qualify	
2019	16	4	2	–	0	10	45	75	16	4th	Did not qualify	
2020*	8	3	0	–	0	5	35	50	9	2nd	Playoffs not held	
2021*	14	3	1	–	2	8	50	71	13	4th	Playoffs not held	
2022	16	2	0	-	1	13	43	78	7	5th	Did not qualify	
2023	16	2	2	-	1	11	49	94	11	5th	Did not qualify	
2024	16	1	1		3	11	58	100	8	5th	Did not qualify	

*The 2020 and 2021 seasons were truncated due to the Covid-19 pandemic.

== Players and personnel ==
=== Current roster ===
Team roster for the 2026 NZIHL season

Dunedin Thunder roster - 2026 NZIHL season
Active roster		Coaching staff
Goaltenders: 30 (New Zealand) Isaac Koh; 30 (New Zealand) Daniel Lee; 41 (New Zealand) James Moore; 58 (New Zealand) Toby Schuck; Defencemen: 6 (Malaysia) Austin Goh (AF); 18 (New Zealand) Shaun Thomson; 19 (New Zealand) Regan Wilson (C); 20 (New Zealand) Edward Lawrence; 22 (New Zealand) Max Hurring; 72 (Canada) Samuel Loiselle (I); 90 (New Zealand) Lachlan Boniface; 91 (New Zealand) Morgan Blair; 93 (Canada) Luke Stegmann (I)	Forwards: 3 (New Zealand) Ollie Rout; 7 (New Zealand) William Bary; 9 (New Zealand) Joe Orr (A); 11 (New Zealand) Thomas Clark; 17 (Japan) Katsuto Ikai; 24 (New Zealand) Jack Lewis; 25 (New Zealand) Sef Johnston; 26 (New Zealand) Tristan Darling; 27 (New Zealand) Ian Audas (A); 31 (New Zealand) Pax Kollar; 34 (New Zealand) Jackson Sam; 37 (New Zealand) Luc Taillon; 43 (New Zealand) Chris Eaden; 45 (New Zealand) Cody Byck; 55 (United States) Rayne Walsh (AF); 88 (Canada) Cole Beckstead (AF)	Head Coach: (France) Guillaume Leclancher; Coaches: (New Zealand) Graeme Darling (TM); Legend (C) Captain (A) Alternate Captain (I) Import player (AF) Affiliate player
Last updated on: 19 July 2026
Elite Prospects NZIHL

=== Team captains ===
- Andre Robichaud, 2013–2014
- Gino Heyd, 2015
- Gints Leitis, 2016

=== Head coaches ===
- James van Leeuwen, 2010–2011
- János Kaszala, 2012–2016
- Matt Hladun, 2017–present

=== General managers ===
- Drew McMillian, 2014
- Pete Hurring, 2015
- Guillaume Leclancher, 2016
- Alexis Robin, 2017
- Dave Richards, 2023–present
