= West Auckland Admirals =

- City: Auckland
- League: New Zealand Ice Hockey League
- Founded: 2005
- Operated: 2005–present
- Home arena: Paradice Avondale
- Colours: Blue, navy blue, yellow, black
- General manager: (New Zealand) Kelly Schultz
- Head coach: (New Zealand) Blake Jackson
- Captain: (New Zealand) Justin Daigle
- Website: www.westaucklandadmirals.co.nz

Championships
- Regular season titles: 1
- NZIHL Champion: 1

The West Auckland Admirals (Also known as the Pure NZ Admirals due to Sponsorship reasons) is an ice hockey team based in Auckland, New Zealand, and are members of the New Zealand Ice Hockey League. The Team has always been based out of the Paradice Ice in Avondale, Auckland which in itself has a proud 41-year operating history. In 2011 the rink completed a massive renovation which brought it to international standards and allowed the Admirals team to install their very own changing room (something not that common among NZ ice hockey clubs).

== History ==
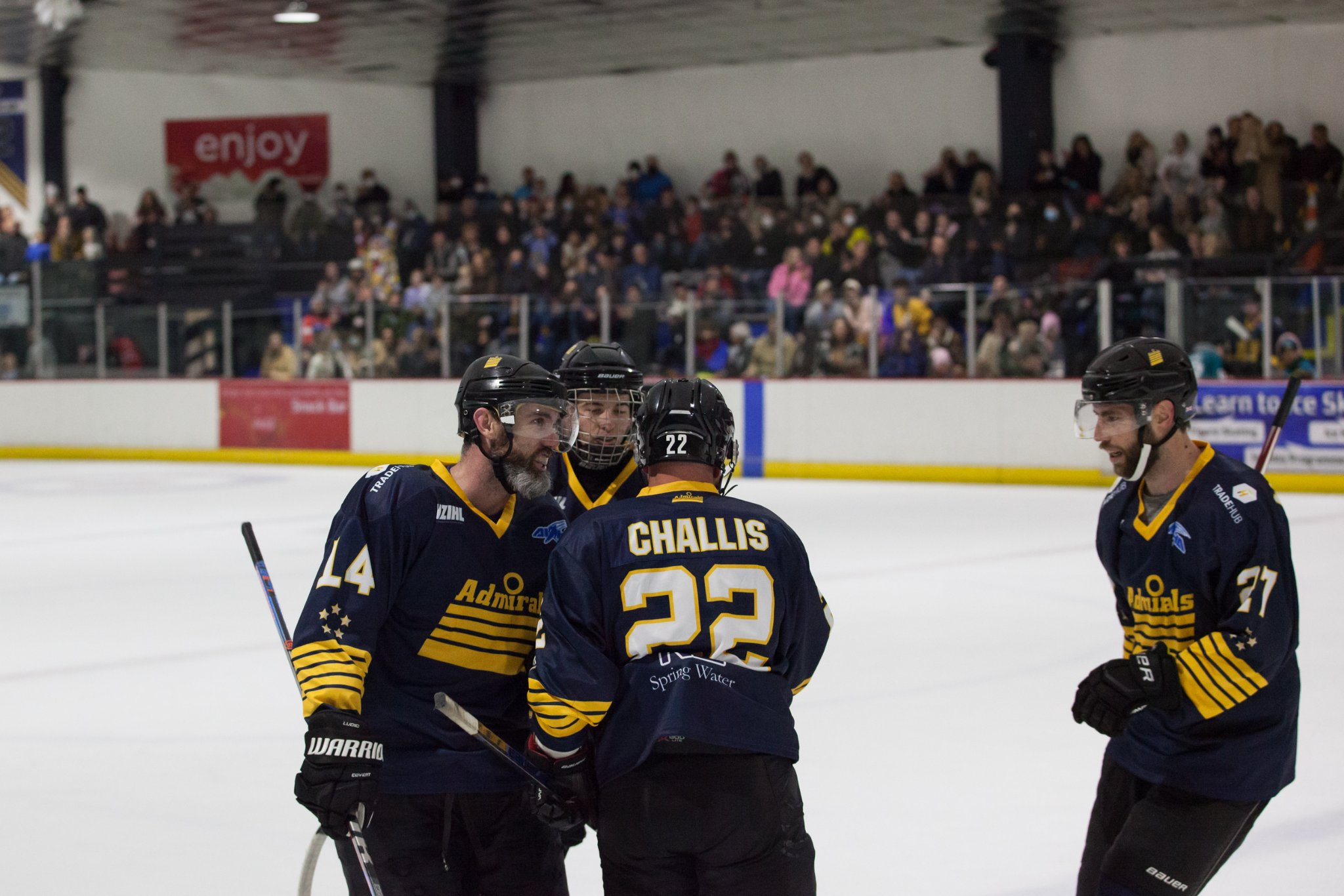
2022 West Auckland Admirals

The West Auckland Admirals were founded in 2005 and joined the New Zealand Ice Hockey League (NZIHL) for its inaugural season. In their debut season the Admirals finished the regular season in second place and advanced to the finals where they went on to lose to the Southern Stampede. From 2006 to 2009 the Admirals failed to qualify for the finals, finishing in last place in 2006 and 2007 and in fourth in 2008 and 2009 ahead of the newest club in the league, the Dunedin Thunder. In 2010 the Admirals returned to the finals after finishing the regular season in second place. The team however went on to lose to the Botany Swarm in the finals. The following season the Admirals finished the regular season in last place, recording only two wins in their sixteen game season. The team slightly improved in the 2012 season with a fourth place finish, nine points ahead of the last placed Botany Swarm. From 2013 to 2015 the Admirals finished the regular season in last place. In 2016 the Admirals narrowly missed out on making the finals finishing in 3rd place and in 2017 the team made the finals again eventually losing to defending champions SkyCity Stampede. In 2018 the Admirals won the championships against the SkyCity Stampede.

After two disrupted seasons due to the Covid-19 Pandemic, the Admirals returned to the Ice in 2022 where they went onto finish first place in the regular season. This would be the first time the Admirals would host a home finals series in Avondale, where they eventually lost to defending champions the SkyCity Stampede.

== Players and personnel ==
=== Current roster ===
2026 Team Roster

West Auckland Admirals roster - 2026 NZIHL season
Active roster		Coaching staff
Goaltenders: 1 (New Zealand) Eythan Prendergast; 34 (New Zealand) Csaba Kercso-Magos; 54 (Canada) Noah Finlay; 55 (New Zealand) Lochlyn Henry; Defencemen: 7 (New Zealand) Sebastian Chamberlin; 8 (New Zealand) Mason Kennedy; 9 (New Zealand) Flynn Hayward-Jones (A); 11 (New Zealand) Lennox King; 20 (Republic of Ireland) Cian Murray; 36 (New Zealand) Stephen Mawson; 37 (New Zealand) Nash Hayward-Jones; 38 (New Zealand) Roscoe Eade (AF); 40 (Canada) Zachery Stephen (AF); 47 (New Zealand) Justin Daigle (C)	Forwards: 3 (Canada) Owen Gouin (I); 4 (New Zealand) Zac Vince; 15 (New Zealand) Vinny Cistrone; 18 (New Zealand) Aidan Chaney; 22 (New Zealand) Max Vesper (A); 23 (Canada) Benjamin Stephen (AF); 26 (Canada) Benjamin De Jonge (I); 28 (New Zealand) Scott Henry; 31 (New Zealand) Rico Clamor; 39 (France) Vadim Sevenier (I); 41 (Canada) Declan Quinn (AF); 42 (New Zealand) Alexander Regan; 43 (New Zealand) Jack Brown; 44 (New Zealand) Owen Brown; 46 (Canada) Sebastian Stephen (AF)	Head Coach: (New Zealand) Blake Jackson; Coaches: (New Zealand) Rodney McMillin (AC); (New Zealand) Natalie de Vere (TM); Legend (C) Captain (A) Alternate Captain (I) Import player (AF) Affiliate player
Last updated on: 19 July 2026
Elite Prospects NZIHL

== Season-by-season results ==
Season	GP	W	OTW	T	OTL	L	GF	GA	PTS	Regular Season Finish	Playoff - Birgel Cup	Ref
2005	6	2	–	4	–	0	31	22	14	2nd	Lost final (Southern Stampede)	
2006	6	1	–	1	–	4	17	27	7	4th	Did not qualify	
2007	10	0	–	0	–	10	29	60	0	4th	Did not qualify	
2008	12	3	–	2	–	7	48	64	15	4th	Did not qualify	
2009	16	3	–	2	–	11	40	99	8	4th	Did not qualify	
2010	16	7	2	–	1	6	74	22	26	2nd	Lost final (Botany Swarm)	
2011	16	1	0	–	1	14	51	110	4	5th	Did not qualify	
2012	16	5	2	–	1	8	74	81	20	4th	Did not qualify	
2013	16	1	0	–	0	15	48	131	3	5th	Did not qualify	
2014	16	1	3	–	0	12	62	86	9	5th	Did not qualify	
2015	16	4	1	–	0	11	65	94	14	5th	Did not qualify	
2016	16	8	1	–	1	6	79	66	27	3rd	Did not qualify	
2017	16	10	0	–	2	4	107	48	32	2nd	Lost final (Skycity Stampede)	
2018	17	13	1	–	1	4	83	51	39	2nd	Won final (Skycity Stampede)	
2019	16	5	2	–	3	6	59	52	22	3rd	Lost final (Skycity Stampede)	
2020	0	0	0	–	0	0	0	0	0	–	Playoffs not held	
2021	16	9	0	–	0	7	57	56	25	3rd	Playoffs cancelled	
2022	18	12	1	–	2	3	66	38	34	1st	Lost final (Skycity Stampede)	

=== Franchise Scoring Leaders ===
Top 10 - Including Playoffs

Stats are updated after each completed NZIHL regular season

#	PLAYER	GP	G	A	TP	PPG	PIM	PERIOD	YEARS
1.	Nicholas Henderson (D/RW)	189	86	97	183	0.97	164	2009-2023	14
2.	Justin Daigle (D)	126	54	113	167	1.33	120	2013-2023	10
3.	Frazer Ellis (F)	165	68	71	139	0.84	212	2010-2023	13
4.	Gareth McLeish (D/F)	242	26	64	90	0.37	256	2004-2023	19
5.	Robert Chamberlain (F)	142	40	36	76	0.54	262	2004-2017	13
6.	Travis McMaster (C)	71	28	48	76	1.07	60	2008-2015	6
7.	Andrew Spiller (D)	69	22	52	74	1.07	54	2015-2019	4
8.	Andrew Hart (F)	170	39	34	73	0.43	373	2004-2023	17
9.	Dale Harrop (C)	84	22	43	65	0.77	78	2016-2022	6
10.	Blake Jackson (D/F)	147	19	40	59	0.40	172	2007-2021	12

=== Franchise all-time most appearances ===
Top 10 - Including Playoffs

Stats are updated after each completed NZIHL regular season

#	PLAYER	GP	G	A	TP	PPG	PIM	PERIOD	YEARS
1.	Gareth McLeish (D/F)	242	26	64	90	0.37	256	2004-2023	19
2.	Nicholas Henderson (D/RW)	189	86	97	183	0.97	164	2009-2023	14
3.	Andrew Hart (F)	170	39	34	73	0.43	373	2004-2023	17
4.	Frazer Ellis (F)	165	68	71	139	0.84	212	2010-2023	13
5.	Nick Craig (D)	158	14	27	41	0.26	87	2009-2021	12
6.	Blake Jackson (D/F)	147	19	40	59	0.40	172	2007-2021	12
7.	Steven Huish (F)	145	22	35	57	0.39	62	2004-2017	11
8.	Dylan Dickson (RW)	145	25	25	50	0.34	58	2008-2023	14
9.	Robert Chamberlain (F)	142	40	36	76	0.54	262	2004-2017	13
10.	Justin Daigle (D)	126	54	113	167	1.33	120	2013-2023	10

=== Team Staff History ===
SEASON	LEAGUE	HEAD COACH	ASST COACH	GM/SM
2022-2023	NZIHL	Cameron Stephen	Matthew Roxborough	Kelly Schultz
2021-2022	NZIHL	Cameron Stephen	Matthew Roxborough	Kelly Schultz
2020-2021	NZIHL	Cameron Stephen	Matthew Roxborough	Tim Ellis
2019-2020	NZIHL			
2018-2019	NZIHL	Csaba Kercso-Magos	Rodney McMillin	Tim Ellis
2017-2018	NZIHL	Csaba Kercso-Magos	Rodney McMillin	Tim Ellis
2016-2017	NZIHL			
2015-2016	NZIHL	Csaba Kercso-Magos	Justin Daigle Rodney McMillin	Shawn Henry
2014-2015	NZIHL	Csaba Kercso-Magos	Justin Daigle Chris Jefferies	Shawn Henry
2013-2014	NZIHL	Chris Belanger	Darren Woodacre	Shawn Henry
2012-2013	NZIHL	Karl Peni	Alex Luggen	Shawn Henry
2011-2012	NZIHL	Rodney McMillin	Jonathan Albright Karl Peni	
2010-2011	NZIHL	Jonathan Albright	Rodney McMillin	
2009-2010	NZIHL	Rodney McMillin	Jonathan Albright	
2008-2009	NZIHL		Mike Parsons	
2007-2008	NZIHL			
2006-2007	NZIHL			
2005-2006	NZIHL			
2004-2005	NZIHL	Anatoli Khorozov		

=== Team Captaincy History ===
SEASON	“C” CAPTAIN(S)	“A1” ALTERNATE CAPTAIN	“A2” ALTERNATE CAPTAIN	“A3” ALTERNATE CAPTAIN
2022-2023	Justin Daigle	Frazer Ellis	Garthe McLeish	Flynn Hayward- Jones
2021-2022	Justin Daigle	Frazer Ellis	Dale Harrop	
2020-2021	Justin Daigle	Nick Craig	Frazer Ellis	
2019-2020	Justin Daigle			
2018-2019	Justin Daigle	Andrew Spiller	Blake Jackson	
2017-2018	Justin Daigle			
2016-2017	Nick Craig	Blake Jackson	Andrew Spiller	
2015-2016	NZIHL			
2014-2015	Justin Daigle	Garthe McLeish	Nicholas Henderson	
2013-2014	Robert Chamberlain	Travis McMaster	Nick Craig	
2012-2013	Gareth McLeish	James Herbert	Robert Chamberlain	
