= Skycity Stampede =

SKYCITY Stampede
- City: Queenstown, New Zealand
- League: New Zealand Ice Hockey League
- Founded: 2005
- Operated: 2005–present
- Home arena: Queenstown Ice Arena
- Colours: Yellow, blue, white
- Mascot: The Beast
- Head coach: (New Zealand) Cameron Frear
- Captain: (New Zealand) Connor Harrison
- Parent club: Queenstown Ice Hockey Club
- Website: www.skycitystampede.com

Franchise history
- 2005-2016: Southern Stampede
- 2016-present: SKYCITY Stampede

Championships
- League champions: 2005, 2006, 2015, 2016, 2017, 2019, 2022, 2023, 2024, 2025, 2026

The SKYCITY Stampede (formerly Southern Stampede) is one of the original teams competing in the New Zealand Ice Hockey League. It is based in Queenstown, New Zealand and was founded in 2005. The team was known as the Southern Stampede until 2016, when Skycity became the sides title sponsor. The team's home ice is the Queenstown Ice Arena.

The team has won 11 NZIHL Championships, the latest being the 2026 season. Their sixth in a row and ninth in ten seasons.

== Current roster ==
Team roster for the 2026 NZIHL season

Skycity Stampede roster - 2026 NZIHL season
Active roster		Coaching staff
Goaltenders: 1 (United States) Matt Swirtz; 31 (New Zealand) Jake Thompson; 35 (New Zealand) Joel Gerard; 39 (New Zealand) Aston Brookes; 59 (New Zealand) Noah Reid; Defencemen: 3 (New Zealand) Stefan Amston (A); 6 (Australia) Cameron Trew; 15 (New Zealand) Jesse Hutchins; 16 (New Zealand) Mitchell Frear (A); 42 (New Zealand) Maxim Kaluzhny; 55 (United States) Maxwell Roth (I); 78 (New Zealand) Ollie Ruski-Jones; 86 (New Zealand) Blake Campbell	Forwards: 8 (New Zealand) Connor Harrison (C); 9 (New Zealand) Axel Ruski-Jones; 11 (United States) Conner Jean (I); 17 (New Zealand) Harrison Macharg; 19 (New Zealand) Jack Robbie; 21 (New Zealand) Dylan Devlin; 22 (New Zealand) Jordan Challis; 24 (New Zealand) Lachlan Frear; 25 (New Zealand) Maxwell Macharg; 28 (New Zealand) Jake Hutchins; 36 (New Zealand) Logan Campbell; 52 (New Zealand) Tyler Challoner; 57 (New Zealand) Tristan Walker; 58 (New Zealand) Benjamin Dixon; 88 (New Zealand) Jackson Flight; 89 (New Zealand) Jaden Skipper; 97 (New Zealand) Josh Hurley	Head Coach: (New Zealand) Cameron Frear; Coaches: (New Zealand) Jayden Skipper (AC); (New Zealand) Stephen Reid (AC); (United States) Matt Swirtz (GC); Legend (C) Captain (A) Alternate Captain (I) Import player (AF) Affiliate player
Last updated on: 19 July 2026
Elite Prospects NZIHL

== Season-by-season results ==
Season	GP	W	OTW	T	OTL	L	GF	GA	PTS	Finish	Playoff	Ref
2005	6	4	–	2	–	0	32	21	16	1st	Won final (West Auckland Admirals)	
2006	6	4	–	0	–	2	25	19	13	2nd	Won final (South Auckland Swarm)	
2007	10	4	–	0	–	6	42	53	12	3rd	Did not qualify	
2008	12	5	–	1	–	6	58	56	18	3rd	Did not qualify	
2009	16	12	–	2	–	2	97	37	26	2nd	Lost final (Canterbury Red Devils)	
2010	16	4	1	–	1	9	51	78	16	5th	Did not qualify	
2011	16	11	0	–	0	5	87	63	33	2nd	Lost final (Botany Swarm)	
2012	16	10	1	–	0	5	81	61	32	1st	Lost final (Canterbury Red Devils)	
2013	16	5	2	–	4	5	85	86	23	4th	Did not qualify	
2014	16	6	1	–	2	7	71	74	22	3rd	Did not qualify	
2015	16	13	2	–	1	0	112	55	44	1st	Won final (Canterbury Red Devils)	
2016	16	12	0	–	1	3	78	37	37	1st	Won final (Canterbury Red Devils)	
2017	16	13	0	–	0	3	88	42	39	1st	Won final (West Auckland Admirals)	
2018	16	13	0	–	0	3	110	44	39	1st	Lost final (West Auckland Admirals)	
2019	16	14	1	–	0	1	77	23	44	1st	Won final (West Auckland Admirals)	
2020	8	8	0	–	0	0	72	15	24	1st	Playoffs not held	
2021	14	14	0	–	0	0	113	33	42	–	Playoffs cancelled	
2022	16	9	2	–	2	3	56	36	34	1st	Won final (West Auckland Admirals)	
2023	18	14	1	–		3	108	49	38	1st	Won final (Botany Swarm)	
2024	18	14	1	–	1	2	122	44	39	1st	Won final (West Auckland Admirals)	
