= 2022 NZWIHL season =

- League: New Zealand Women's Ice Hockey League
- Sport: Ice hockey
- Duration: 12 August 2022 – 25 September 2022

Regular season
- Premiers: Wakatipu Wild
- Season MVP: Lova Holmqvist (Wakatipu Wild)
- Top scorer: Kellye Nelson (19 points) (Wakatipu Wild)

NZWIHL Finals
- Champions: Wakatipu Wild (1st title)
- Runners-up: Canterbury Inferno

NZWIHL seasons
- ← 2021 2023 →

The 2023 NZWIHL season is the ninth season of the New Zealand Women's Ice Hockey League (NZWIHL). It ran from 12 August 2022 until 25 September 2022. Four teams competed in 12 regular season games followed by 4 playoff games, making up the NZWIHL Finals weekend. The Wakatipu Wild claimed the double by winning both the premiership title for finishing top of the regular season standings and the championship title by winning the grand final. Canterbury Inferno finished runner-up to both titles and the Dunedin Thunder claimed the wooden spoon.

== Teams ==
In 2022 the NZWIHL had four teams, consisting of one from the North Island and three from the South Island.

2022 NZWIHL teams
Team	City	Arena	Head coach	Captain
Auckland Steel	Auckland	Paradice Avondale	(France) Jeff Boehme	(New Zealand) Helen Murray
Canterbury Inferno	Christchurch	Alpine Ice Centre	(New Zealand) Matthew Sandford	(New Zealand) Bridie Gibbings
Dunedin Thunder	Dunedin	Dunedin Ice Stadium	(United States) Barrett Wilson	(New Zealand) Abbey Heale
Wakatipu Wild	(Otago) Queenstown	Queenstown Ice Arena	(Canada) Colin McIntosh	(United States) Kellye Nelson

== League Business ==
The league was on the agenda at the New Zealand Ice Hockey Federation (NZIHF) annual general meeting (AGM) in February and November 2022. The NZIHF confirmed they had underwritten team travel expenses in 2022 in order to ensure the 2022 season could be played, given the disruption and early end to the 2021 season. The league had been focusing on improving social media delivery for 2022. The updated league events manual was released in July 2022, ahead of the season commencing.

== Regular season ==
Running between 12 August 2022 until 18 September 2022, the NZWIHL regular season consisted of 12 games in total, with each team playing six games.

=== Fixtures & results ===
2022 regular season
Game #	Date	Time	Home	Score	Away	Location	Recap
1	12 August 2022	18:45	Wakatipu Wild	5–0	Canterbury Inferno	Queenstown Ice Arena
2	13 August 2022	15:30	Dunedin Thunder	5–7	Auckland Steel	Dunedin Ice Stadium
3	13 August 2022	18:45	Wakatipu Wild	1–2 (OT)	Canterbury Inferno	Queenstown Ice Arena
4	14 August 2022	10:00	Dunedin Thunder	4–7	Auckland Steel	Dunedin Ice Stadium
5	3 September 2022	16:30	Canterbury Inferno	4–0	Dunedin Thunder	Alpine Ice Centre
6	3 September 2022	16:30	Auckland Steel	0–3	Wakatipu Wild	Paradice Avondale
7	4 September 2022	16:30	Canterbury Inferno	2–0	Dunedin Thunder	Alpine Ice Centre
8	4 September 2022	16:30	Auckland Steel	3–6	Wakatipu Wild	Paradice Avondale
9	16 September 2022	18:45	Wakatipu Wild	15–1	Dunedin Thunder	Queenstown Ice Arena
10	17 September 2022	16:30	Canterbury Inferno	7–5	Auckland Steel	Alpine Ice Centre
11	17 September 2022	18:45	Wakatipu Wild	3–1	Dunedin Thunder	Queenstown Ice Arena
12	18 September 2022	16:30	Canterbury Inferno	1–5	Auckland Steel	Alpine Ice Centre

Key:

Winner	Draw

=== Standings ===
Pos	Team	Pld	W	OTW	D	OTL	L	GF	GA	GD	Pts	Qualification or relegation
1	Wakatipu Wild (P, C)	6	5	0	0	1	0	33	7	+26	16	2023 NZWIHL Finals
2	Canterbury Inferno	6	3	1	0	0	2	16	16	0	11	2023 NZWIHL Finals
3	Auckland Steel	6	3	0	0	0	3	27	26	+1	9	2023 NZWIHL Finals
4	Dunedin Thunder	6	0	0	0	0	6	11	38	−27	0	2023 NZWIHL Finals

Source: NZWIHL Elite Prospects
Rules for classification:
Tie-break: 1) points; 2) goal difference; 3) number of goals scored
Points: 3 points for regulation win; 2 points for OT or SO win; 1 point for OT or SO loss or tie/draw; 0 points for regulation loss
(C) Champion; (P) Premiers

=== Player stats ===
The season's league leader statistics for skaters and goaltenders.

Points
No.	Name	Pos	PTS
1	(United States) Kellye Nelson	Fwd	19
2	(New Zealand) Jasmine Horner-Pascoe	Fwd	18
3	(Sweden) Lova Holmqvist	Fwd	16
4	(New Zealand) Anjali Mulari	Fwd	11
5	(New Zealand) Gina Davis	Fwd	9

Penalty minutes
No.	Name	Pos	PIM
1	(New Zealand) Jamieson Taute	Def	16
2	(Canada) Emma Ahvennie	Fwd	14
3	(New Zealand) Rosie Harris	Fwd	12
4	(New Zealand) Bridie Gibbings	Fwd	12
5	(New Zealand) Gabrielle Mills	Fwd	12

Save percentage
No.	Name	Pos	SV%
1	(Canada) Sierra Morgulis	Gk	.938
2	(New Zealand) Jordan Wichman	Gk	.916
3	(New Zealand) Lochlyn Hyde	Gk	.888
4	(New Zealand) Justine Berry	Gk	.887
5	(New Zealand) Maddy Fox	Gk	.864

=== Season awards ===
Below lists the 2022 NZWIHL season award winners.

Award	Name	Team
Most Valuable Player	(Sweden) Lova Holmqvist	Wakatipu Wild
U18 Most Valuable Player	(New Zealand) Caitlin Hollyer	Wakatipu Wild
Best Forward	(New Zealand) Jasmine Horner-Pascoe	Auckland Steel
Best Defence	(New Zealand) Jaime Jones	Auckland Steel
Best Goaltender	(Canada) Sierra Morgulis	Canterbury Inferno
Sports Person of the Year	(New Zealand) Abbey Heale	Dunedin Thunder

== NZWIHL playoffs ==
The top four teams in the NZWIHL regular season qualify for the NZWIHL playoffs. The playoffs is held on a single weekend and uses New Zealand conventions of being called Finals. The playoff system used by the NZWIHL is a four team single game semi-finals and grand final system where the semi-final winners progress to the grand final and the losers playoff for third place. Semi-finals are played on the Saturday and the third place playoff and grand final is played on the Sunday. Th winner of the grand final is awarded a trophy and the top three teams are awarded gold, silver and bronze medals at the conclusion of the grand final. The NZWIHL also uses this time to announce team and league season awards.

In 2022, all four teams in the league qualified for the finals weekend. The event was held on the weekend of 24 and 25 September 2022 in host city Dunedin at Dunedin Ice Stadium. On day one, first placed Wakatipu Wild played fourth placed Dunedin Thunder in the first semi-final game and won comfortably. Second placed Canterbury Inferno ensured the top two seeds progressed to the grand final with a five goals to two victory over the Auckland Steel in semi-final two. On Day two of the Finals weekend, Auckland played hosts Dunedin for the bronze medal. Both teams made a number of changes including goaltenders and it was the Steel who defeated the Thunder and claimed bronze. In the grand final, the Wild successfully shutout the Inferno to claim their first ever NZWIHL championship title in their second full season since their formation in 2020.

Semi-finals
24 September - Dunedin
Wakatipu Wild	7
Dunedin Thunder	2
24 September - Dunedin
Canterbury Inferno	5
Auckland Steel	2

Grand Final
25 September - Dunedin
Wakatipu Wild	2
Canterbury Inferno	0
Third place
25 September - Dunedin
Auckland Steel	5
Dunedin Thunder	4

=== Semi-finals ===
24 September 2022; 15:30	Wakatipu Wild	7–2 (3–1, 4–0, 0–1)	Dunedin Thunder	Dunedin Ice Stadium

Game reference
(New Zealand) Lilly Forbes	Goalies	(New Zealand) Maddy Fox	Referee: Ashleigh Davidson; Linesmen: Aaron Chisholm; Sonya Texley
2 min	Penalties	4 min	Referee: Ashleigh Davidson; Linesmen: Aaron Chisholm; Sonya Texley
32	Shots	19	Referee: Ashleigh Davidson; Linesmen: Aaron Chisholm; Sonya Texley

24 September 2022; 18:15	Canterbury Inferno	5–2 (2–0, 0–2, 3–0)	Auckland Steel	Dunedin Ice Stadium

Game reference
(Canada) Sierra Morgulis	Goalies	(New Zealand) Lochlyn Hyde	Referee: Tania Bermudez; Linesmen: Ashleigh Davidson; Gigi Hollyer
8 min	Penalties	8 min	Referee: Tania Bermudez; Linesmen: Ashleigh Davidson; Gigi Hollyer
36	Shots	18	Referee: Tania Bermudez; Linesmen: Ashleigh Davidson; Gigi Hollyer

=== Third place playoff ===
25 September 2022; 07:15	Auckland Steel	5–4 (0–1, 3–1, 2–2)	Dunedin Thunder	Dunedin Ice Stadium

Game reference

(New Zealand) Zadia Paulse
Goalies
(New Zealand) Ashley Dickinson
Referee:
Tania Bermudez
Linesmen:
Gigi Hollyer
Kyle Matthews

	0–1	Heale.C – (Linton)
	0–2	Cross – (Keenan)
(unassisted) – Neville-Lamb	1–2
(Hansen) – Murray	2–2
(Taute) – Mulari	3–2
(Neville-Lamb) – Murray	4–2
	4–3	Heale.C – (Cross)
(unassisted) – Mulari	5–3
	5–4	Heale.A – (Heale.C)

6 min
Penalties
6 min
39
Shots
21

=== Final ===
25 September 2022; 10:00	Wakatipu Wild	2–0 (1–0, 0–0, 1–0)	Canterbury Inferno	Dunedin Ice Stadium

Game reference
(New Zealand) Lilly Forbes	Goalies	(Canada) Sierra Morgulis	Referee: Ashleigh Davidson; Linesmen: Aaron Chisholm; Sonya Texley
(unassisted) – Davis / 1–0; (Nelson, Davis) – Holmqvist / 2–0			Referee: Ashleigh Davidson; Linesmen: Aaron Chisholm; Sonya Texley
6 min	Penalties	6 min	Referee: Ashleigh Davidson; Linesmen: Aaron Chisholm; Sonya Texley
27	Shots	22	Referee: Ashleigh Davidson; Linesmen: Aaron Chisholm; Sonya Texley

Gold	Silver	Bronze
(Otago) Wakatipu Wild	(Christchurch) Canterbury Inferno	Auckland Steel
