= Queenstown Ice Arena =

Public sports venue in Queenstown, Otago, New Zealand

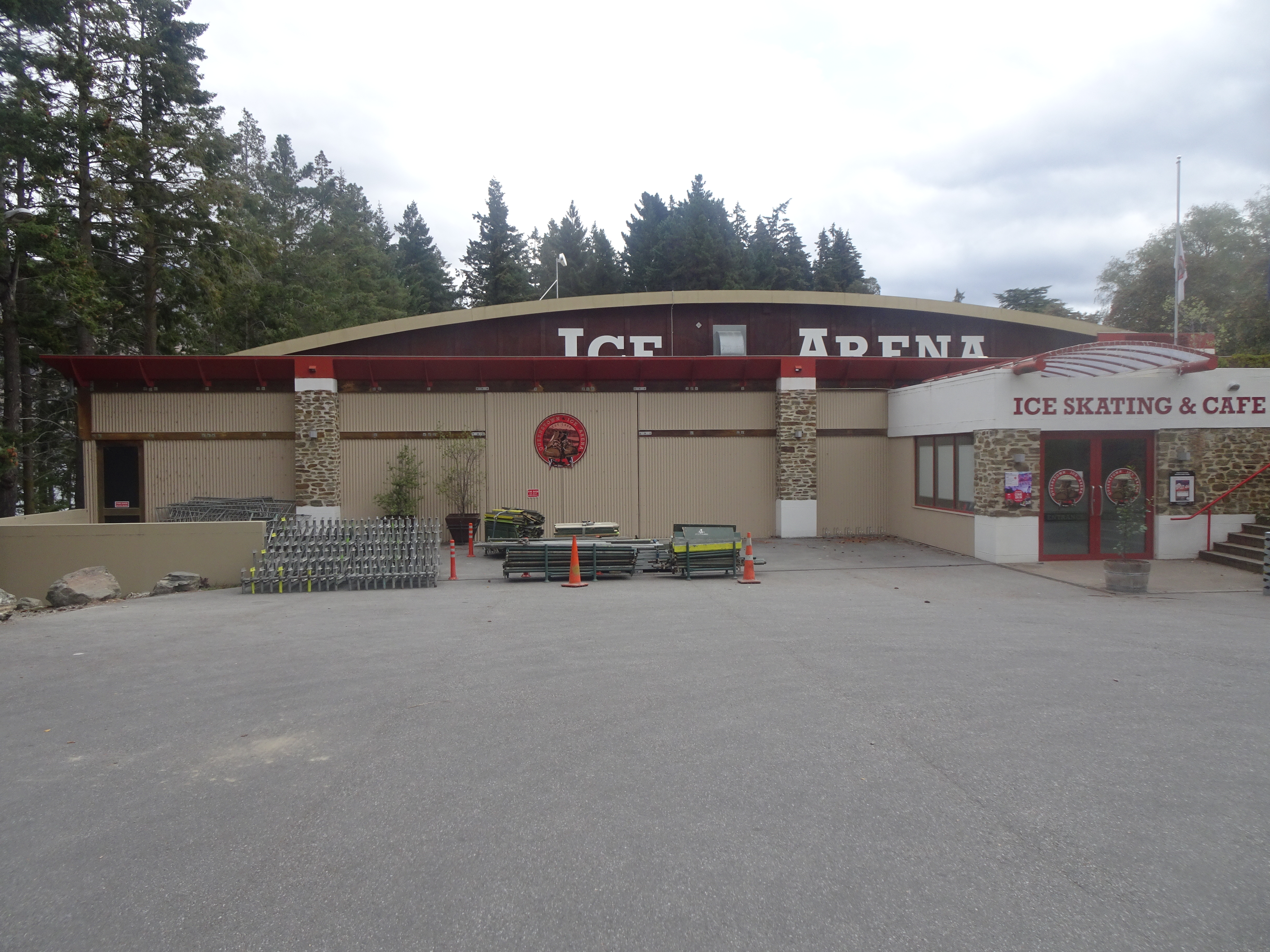
- Interactive map of Queenstown Ice Arena
- Location: 29 Park Street, Queenstown, New Zealand, 9300
- Coordinates: 45.03748°S 168.66169°E
- Capacity: 642 (seated); 1,000 (standing in concert setup); 1,200 (indoor/outdoor events)
- Surface: Ice

Construction
- Opened: 1966 (59 years ago); Opened as an outdoor rink
- Renovated: 1996 (29 years ago); Opened as an indoor arena

Tenants
- Skycity Stampede (2008–present); Wakatipu Wild (2020–present); Olympic Ice Sports Club (2017–present); Queenstown Ice Hockey Club (1995–present); Queenstown Ice Skating Club (1968–present)

Website
- www.queenstownicearena.co.nz

The Queenstown Ice Arena is an ice sports and public skate centre, opened originally in 1966 as an outdoor ice rink it was later rebuilt as an indoor arena in 1996 and is located at Queenstown Gardens, next to the town of Queenstown, Otago, New Zealand. It is the current home venue of the Skycity Stampede in the New Zealand Ice Hockey League (NZIHL) and Wakatipu Wild in the New Zealand Women's Ice Hockey League (NZWIHL). Queenstown Ice Arena is the only ice rink in Queenstown and is one of only two in Otago, along with Dunedin Ice Stadium.

== History ==
=== Outdoor rink ===
The first artificial ice surface was laid down in 1966 in Queenstown Gardens. The rink was named the Gardens Outdoor Ice Rink and at its opening in 1966 it drew a crowd of over 2,000 people. The manager of the Gardens Outdoor Ice Rink was Eoin Buckley. The rink was popular with locals and visitors to the area. The Queenstown Ice Hockey Club (QIHC) and Queenstown Ice Skating Club (QISC) were formed and used the rink for local competition. Early ice hockey games between local rivals Queenstown Rangers and Arrowtown's Arrowtown Arrows drew large crowds that would sell out the venue. The outdoor rink's freezing plant was sourced from an old freezing works and did not have automatic start up, making it difficult for the manager to maintain the ice sheet. The Gardens Outdoor Ice Rink closed in 1995 due to financial difficulties.

=== Indoor arena ===
In 1996, an investor group led by Christophe Huck and Firdaus Siddick planned, built and opened the indoor arena on the same site as the old outdoor rink for $4 million. The new arena was named the Queenstown Ice Arena. In 2010, the Graham family, hailing from Canada, purchased the arena and began an extensive programme of renovations as per an agreement with the Queenstown Lakes District Council to spend $500,000 on renovations in the first five years in exchange for a lease till the year 2050. Since then, Dan and Ted Graham have been completing renovations in stages and as of 2019 had spent $2.6 million on the facility (figure including purchase price and upgrades). They first started with sealing the building. Then they purchased a dehumidifier to keep moisture levels down and consistent. In 2016, to ready the arena for the 50th anniversary of the opening of the original Gardens outdoor ice rink, the old wooden dasher boards and netting were replaced with new protective barriers and 15 millimetre-thick glass. The new ice surface enclosure provides the biggest visual upgrade to the rink since the new owners took over in 2010. Since 2016, new stadium seating has been installed to improve patron comfort.

== Facilities ==
The arena's facilities were built in 1996 and have been gradually updated since 2010. They include:

- Ice rink (with plexi-glass and LED lighting)
- Ice Bumper Cars
- Stadium seating for 642 people (up to 1,000 standing for concerts)
- Skate hire
- Cafe and lounge
- Licensed Bar
- Locker rooms
- Customer parking

== Events ==
During the first ten years the rink was open, it would host local and national ice hockey events. The Queenstown Rangers and Arrowtown Arrows would regularly play each other at the venue. Queenstown, who were coached by Bernie Graf and captained by Keith Ponder, won the Erewhon Cup and was placed second in the national club championships during this time.

Since the indoor arena was built in 1996, the venue has had flexibility to host different kinds of events, including: ice sports, sporting tournaments, fundraising events, concerts, cocktail, dinner and work parties, trade shows, product launches, wedding receptions, clinics, workshops and film and commercial shoots. Since inception in 2009, the rink has become one of the ice sports venues for the New Zealand Winter Games (NZWG). NZWG is an international multi-sport event, organised by the Winter Games New Zealand Trust, held every two years in New Zealand. The rink has hosted a number of international ice hockey games, most notably multiple Trans-Tasman Challenges between the Australian Mighty Roos and New Zealand Ice Blacks, both during the NZWG and outside of it. In 2018, the arena hosted a top-level professional Canada versus United States ice hockey game, to a sell-out crowd.

== See also ==
- List of ice rinks in New Zealand
- Sport in New Zealand
