= Dunedin Stadium =

Dunedin Stadium may refer to:

- Dunedin Stadium (Florida), formerly known as Knology Park and Florida Auto Exchange Stadium, a baseball stadium in Dunedin, Florida, US
- Dunedin Ice Stadium, formerly Dunedin Stadium, an ice rink in St Kilda, New Zealand
- Forsyth Barr Stadium at University Plaza, known in its planning stages as Dunedin Stadium, a rugby stadium in Dunedin, New Zealand
