= List of ice rinks in New Zealand =

The following is a list of ice rinks in New Zealand:

== Indoor ==
- Alexandra Curling Club, Alexandra, Otago
- Alpine Ice Centre, Christchurch, Canterbury
- Dunedin Ice Stadium, Dunedin, Otago
- Frosty Spot Ice Rink, Upper Hutt, Wellington
- Gore Multisports Complex, Gore, Southland
- Maniototo International Curling Rink, Naseby, Otago
- Paradice Avondale Ice Arena, Avondale, Auckland
- Paradice Botany Downs Ice Arena, Botany Downs, Auckland
- Queenstown Ice Arena, Queenstown, Otago

== Outdoor (seasonal) ==
- Idaburn Dam, Oturehua, Otago
- Manorburn Dam, Alexandra, Otago
- Queenstown Gardens Ice Rink, Queenstown, Otago
- Staveley Ice Skating & Curling Rinks, Staveley, Canterbury
