= New Zealand Women's Ice Hockey League =

Women's ice hockey league in New Zealand

- Current season, competition or edition: 2026 NZWIHL season
- Sport: Ice hockey
- Founded: 2014 (12 years ago)
- First season: 2014
- CEO: Michelle Cox
- Director: Jan Goulding; Carl McIntyre; Paul de Vere
- President: Andy Mills
- No. of teams: 4
- Country: New Zealand
- Confederation: NZIHF
- Most recent champions: Auckland Steel (7th title)
- Most titles: Auckland Steel (7 titles)
- Broadcaster: YouTube
- Level on pyramid: 1
- Website: www.nzwihl.com

The New Zealand Women's Ice Hockey League (NZWIHL) is New Zealand's top-tier women's ice hockey league. Established in 2014 as New Zealand's first women's national league, the NZWIHL has amateur status and is sanctioned by the New Zealand Ice Hockey Federation (a member of the International Ice Hockey Federation). The NZWIHL is currently contested by four teams from both the North and South Islands. The league champion is awarded the Championship Trophy and gold medals and the league premier is awarded the Premiership Trophy. The most successful team in NZWIHL history is Auckland Steel, who have claimed seven championship titles. They are the current reigning champion.

== History ==
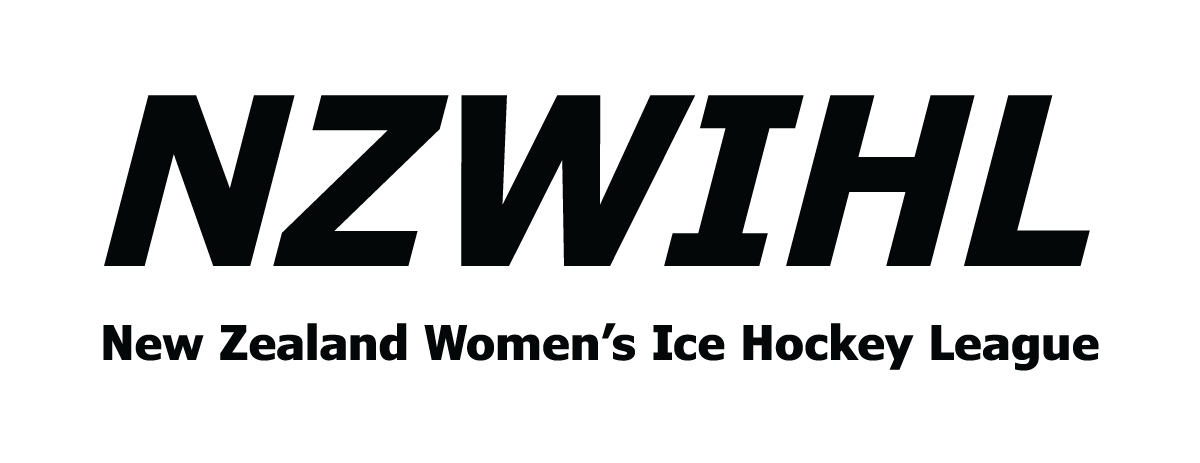
Original league logo used from foundation in 2014 until 2020

The New Zealand Women's Ice Hockey League (NZWIHL) was established in 2014 as New Zealand's top level women's national league. The newly formed league was set up to support the National Women's team, the Ice Fernz, for their IIHF World Championship seasons. The league would provide opportunity for female players of all ages to develop their skills and play together in a competitive environment. The league was founded with three teams, including: Auckland Steel, Canterbury Devilettes and Southern Storm.

The Auckland Steel topped the league standings in the first season to claim the first league premiership before they won the inaugural 2014 NZWIHL season grand final, to become the league's first championship team. The NZWIHL remained a three team league between 2014 and 2019, with Auckland establishing itself as a dominant force in the league, with four championship titles during this time. Canterbury were crowned champions in the second NZWIHL season and Southern Storm won the 2018 season. In 2020, a league decision saw the disbanding of the combined Southern Storm team and the establishment of two separate teams for the NZWIHL. The Dunedin Thunder and Wakatipu Wild were formed and based in Dunedin and Queenstown in the Otago region respectively. They joined the league and first competed in the 2020 NZWIHL season. Before the 2021 season, in July 2021, the Canterbury Devilettes changed their name to the Canterbury Inferno to create a separate identity from the Red Devils men's team. In August 2021, the league had to be cancelled midway through the season due to the New Zealand Government lock-downs to help minimise the COVID-19 pandemic. Originally the league still hoped to play finals at a later date, but that too got cancelled in November 2021. In 2022, Wakatipu Wild was the first of the two new teams to claim a league premiership and championship, when it went almost undefeated for the regular season and then won both games in finals.

== Teams ==
New Zealand Women's Ice Hockey League
Team	Colours	City	Arena	Capacity	Founded	Joined	Former names	Notes
Auckland Steel		Auckland	Paradice Avondale	500	2014			Founding team
Canterbury Inferno		Christchurch	Alpine Ice Centre	700	2014		Canterbury Devilettes (2014–19)	Founding team
Dunedin Thunder		Dunedin	Dunedin Ice Stadium	1,850	2020			2020 Southern Storm team split
Wakatipu Wild		(Otago) Queenstown	Queenstown Ice Arena	642	2020			2020 Southern Storm team split

Former teams
Team	Colours	City	Arena	Capacity	Joined	Left	Former names	Notes
Southern Storm		Dunedin	Dunedin Ice Stadium	1,850	2014	2019		Founding team, was split up into the Thunder and Wild.

=== Auckland Steel ===
Current teams

The Auckland Steel ice hockey organisation was established in 2014. They are one of three founding teams of the NZWIHL, along with the Canterbury Devilettes (now known as the Inferno) and Southern Storm. The Steel are based at Paradice Avondale, located at in the western Auckland suburb of Avondale. Auckland are four times NZWIHL champions and one time NZWIHL premiers.

German coach, Andreas Kaisser, known as Andy, was appointed inaugural head coach of the Auckland Steel ahead of the foundation season of the NZWIHL in 2014. He was joined by Canadian pair Garret Ferguson and Jonathan Albright as his assistants. Philippa Kaisser was appointed the Steel's first general manager (GM). On 29 November 2014, Auckland contested the very first NZWIHL game against the Southern Storm in Auckland. Forward, Hannah Shields, scored the Steel's and the League's inaugural goal after five minutes in the first period to give the home team the lead. Southern tied the game five minutes later but Auckland Steel controlled the game after that and went on to score their maiden win, defeating the Storm 11–4. The Steel turned that good first result into solid form for the remainder of 2014, winning ten of twelve games. This form propelled them to the top of the league standings and the maiden NZWIHL Championship title.

Auckland established itself as a powerhouse in the NZWIHL, finishing top the table and winning four Championships in the first six years of the competition, including titles in 2014, 2016, 2017 and 2019. In 2020, the league brought in a playoff format (Finals). The Steel finished the season on top of the league standings once more, to claim the first ever NZWIHL Premiership title. Auckland went on to lose the first NZWIHL Grand Final to Canterbury Inferno 4–2, claiming silver medals at the post-game medal and trophy ceremony. The 2021 season was incomplete and abandoned following travel restrictions imposed by the New Zealand Government during the COVID-19 pandemic. In 2022, the NZWIHL returned to a full season. The Steel finished third in the regular season standings before claiming bronze medals in the NZWIHL Finals. They won their bronze-medal play-off against Dunedin Thunder 5–4, in a tightly contested game.

=== Canterbury Inferno ===
The Canterbury Inferno was established in 2014 as the Canterbury Devilettes. They are one of three original teams of the NZWIHL, along with the Auckland Steel and Southern Storm. The Inferno are based at Alpine Ice Centre, located at in the Christchurch inner-city suburb of Opawa. Canterbury are two time NZWIHL champions.

The team's original name, the Devilettes, was a derivative of the already well-established men's team Canterbury Red Devils. who have competed in the New Zealand Ice Hockey League since 2005.

Former New Zealand international player with the Ice Fernz, Angelique Mawson, was appointed inaugural head coach of Canterbury prior to the 2014 NZWIHL season. On 6 December 20214, Canterbury contested their opening NZWIHL game against the Southern Storm in Dunedin. Shannen Kennedy scored the Devilettes first ever NZWIHL goal in the second period against the Storm. After a close game for the first two periods, Canterbury out performed the Storm in the third period to defeats the hosts 8–2 and secure the team's maiden win. The Devilettes finished their first season last in the regular season standings, two points behind the Storm above them. Canterbury performed better in the second NZWIHL season, finishing the season with the same points as Auckland at the top of the league table. The Devilettes claimed their first championship title on goal difference, with their free-scoring forwards proving the difference to the Auckland Steel. Canterbury had five of the top six scoring leaders for the season, including Marisa Blanco, who topped the leaders chart with 38 points from ten games. In 2020, Canterbury claimed their second NZWIHL championship title with a 4–2 come-from-behind grand final victory over Auckland. It was the first ever NZWIHL grand final, since the league introduced a Finals series ahead of the 2020 season. In July 2021, following the team's second league title, the Canterbury Devilettes changed their name to the Canterbury Inferno to create a separate identity from the Red Devils men's team. In 2022, the Inferno made it to their second NZWIHL grand final. However, unlike in 2020, they were defeated by Queenstown based Wakatipu Wild 2–0 in the grand final, held at Dunedin Ice Stadium.

== Season structure and rules ==
As per 2022.

=== Regular season ===
The NZWIHL regular season is typically played over three months, with dates varying from season to season. The regular season consists of twelve games in total, with each team playing six games. The regular season is broken up into two rounds with a round-robin format used. An overtime period (OT) and shootout (SO) are used to ensure there is always a winner when time permits during the regular season. In the unlikely event of there being no time for OT or SO, then a draw will be declared.

=== Game length ===
The NZWIHL has adopted the international standard three 20-minute stop-time periods length for all regular season and finals games. All games progress to overtime and then a shootout in case teams are tied at the end of regulation time. In order to allow appropriate time for overtime to occur, rinks are booked to 2 1/2 hours as a minimum requirement in the NZWIHL.

=== Game rules and points system ===
All games and NZWIHL events are to be played in accordance to the rules set out in the NZWIHL events manual, followed by the International Ice Hockey Federation Rule Book. Governance for the events manual falls to the NZWIHL executive, headed by the General Manager (GM), and oversighted by the New Zealand Ice Hockey Federation (NZIHF) Management Committee. The NZWIHL points system, follows similar systems widely used in Europe and Australian ice hockey leagues. 3 points is awarded for a regulation time win, 2 points for a shootout win, 1 point for a shootout loss and 0 points for a regulation time loss. In the unlikely event of a draw, both teams will be awarded 1 point each.

=== Roster & import rules ===
There are no maximum roster limits in the NZWIHL. Players must be 13 years or older to play in the NZWIHL. NZWIHL players are broken up into two categories, regional players (New Zealand or Australian citizens) and import players (a citizen of any other country). Import players must have a cleared international transfer card (ITC) in order to be eligible to play an NZWIHL game. There are no limits on the number of import players allowed on a team's roster, however there is a limit on the number of import players teams are allowed to dress for a game. As of 2022, five import players from each team (10 total) are allowed to dress for any one game. Players from the Wellington region are provided additional travel supports by the league to play in the NZWIHL, given they do not have a representative team of their own in the league. The NZWIHL covers the travelling costs of travelling teams up to 15 skaters, two goaltenders and three staff (20 in total). Any additional travelling players or staff need to be financial covered by the teams themselves.

=== Playoffs ===
Playoffs are known in the NZWIHL as the Finals. They are played over a single weekend in a chosen location. The NZWIHL executive chooses the finals location. As of 2022, the Finals weekend involves four games in total, two semi-finals played on the Saturday followed by a third-place playoff and grand final on the Sunday. The top four teams from the regular season qualify for the finals weekend. The top seed plays the fourth seed in the first semi final followed by two verses three in the second semi. The two teams who win the semi-finals games progress to the grand final and the two teams who lose progress to the bronze medal game. The winner of the grand final is named NZWIHL champion and lifts the championship trophy. Gold, silver and bronze medals are given to rostered players and team officials on the teams who finish first, second and third in finals.

== League champions ==
=== NZWIHL champions by seasons (2014-present) ===
Season-by-season Championships and Premierships
Season	(gold) Champion	(silver) Silver	(bronze) Bronze	Premier
2014	Auckland Steel	-	-	-
2015	Canterbury Devilettes	-	-	-
2016	Auckland Steel	-	-	-
2017	Auckland Steel	-	-	-
2018	Southern Storm	-	-	-
2019	Auckland Steel	-	-	-
2020	Canterbury Inferno	Auckland Steel	Wakatipu Wild	Auckland Steel
2021	NZWIHL season cancelled, no championship awarded
2022	Wakatipu Wild	Canterbury Inferno	Auckland Steel	Wakatipu Wild
2023	-	-	-	-

=== NZWIHL champions all-time record ===
All-time Championships
Team	# Titles	Years
Auckland Steel	4	2014, 2016, 2017, 2019
Canterbury Inferno	2	2015, 2020
Southern Storm	1	2018
Wakatipu Wild	1	2022

== Broadcasting ==
Current:

- YouTube (2020 – present) – The NZWIHL self broadcast league games live on YouTube on their official channel. Due to limited resources, not all games are broadcast.

== Current rosters ==
Auckland Steel roster - 2022 NZWIHL season
Active roster		Coaching staff
Goaltenders: 1 (New Zealand) Tabitha Crump; 29 (New Zealand) Lochlyn Hyde; 30 (New Zealand) Zadia Paulse; Defencemen: 8 (New Zealand) Laurianne Buckthought; 13 (New Zealand) Sophie Harold; 3 (Hungary) RLili Hidvégi (I); 51 (New Zealand) Rikki-Lee McLean; 11 (New Zealand) Rachael Neville-Lamb (A); 14 (New Zealand) Charlotte Pye; 9 (New Zealand) Jamieson Taute; 19 (New Zealand) Bella Vogel	Forwards: 24 (New Zealand) Katya Blong; 4 (New Zealand) Suzanne Broadbent; 20 (New Zealand) Terryn Bruce; 15 (New Zealand) Emma Child; 2 (New Zealand) Hope Gregory; 7 (New Zealand) Lily Hansen; 12 (New Zealand) Alexandra Hefford; 17 (New Zealand) Jessica Hofert; 21 (New Zealand) Jasmine Horner-Pascoe (A); 15 (New Zealand) Jamie Kaisser; 23 (Canada) Andree Lalonde (I); 7 (Malaysia) Nur Illina Mohd Rothi; 2 (New Zealand) Anjali Mulari; 6 (New Zealand) Helen Murray (C); 5 (New Zealand) Jemma Read; 10 (New Zealand) Ashley Richmond; 28 (New Zealand) Jazz Squier; 22 (New Zealand) Emma Thorne; 18 (New Zealand) Alice Tindall; 86 (New Zealand) Sabina Tunnicliffe; 16 (France) Ava Wardecki (I)	Head Coach: (France) Geoffroy Boehme; Coaches: (New Zealand) Michelle Cox; (Canada) Brittany Carroll; (Finland) Krista Laine; Legend (C) Captain (A) Alternate Captain (I) Import player Statistics; Average age: 25.6 years Average height: 163.8 cm Average weight: 64.9 kg
Last updated on: 6 March 2023
Elite Prospects

Canterbury Inferno roster - 2022 NZWIHL season
Active roster		Coaching staff
Goaltenders: 20 (New Zealand) Justine Berry; 28 (New Zealand) Coco Cruishank; 1 (Canada) Sierra Morgulis; Defencemen: 64 (New Zealand) Natasha Blakie; 15 (Canada) Anneke Cameron (I); 81 (United States) Rachel Clarkson (I); 7 (New Zealand) Ellie Dugdale; 22 (New Zealand) Eden Greaves; 19 (New Zealand) Indie Lewis; 8 (New Zealand) Millicent Smith; 11 (New Zealand) Caitlyn Stefanissin; 5 (New Zealand) Brooke Whitman; 17 (New Zealand) Krystie Woodyear-Smith	Forwards: 44 (New Zealand) Bridie Gibbings (C); 31 (New Zealand) Katrina Gordon; 27 (New Zealand) Nerhys Gordon; 10 (Canada) Gabriel Guerin (I); 21 (New Zealand) Lucy-Jane Hart; 12 (New Zealand) Jacinta Hoglund; 14 (New Zealand) Sophie Jefferies; 9 (New Zealand) Jemma Jonker; 9 (Poland) Jasmine Kamminga (I); 6 (New Zealand) Emma Kloss; 4 (Canada) Stephanie Koviessen (I) (A); 16 (New Zealand) Tessa Randell; 3 (New Zealand) Reagyn Shattock; 24 (New Zealand) Hannah Shields (A); 21 (Czech Republic) Veronika Zajícová (I)	Head Coach: (New Zealand) Matthew Sandford; Coaches: (Canada) Sierra Morgulis; (New Zealand) Simon Cruickshank; Legend (C) Captain (A) Alternate Captain (I) Import player Statistics; Average age: 18.4 years Average height: 162 cm Average weight: 60.8 kg
Last updated on: 3 March 2023
Elite Prospects
