= 2025 IIHF World Championship Division II =

Ice hockey world championships

Tournament details
- Host countries: Serbia; New Zealand
- Venues: 2 (in 2 host cities)
- Dates: 29 April – 5 May; 27 April – 3 May
- Teams: 12

The 2025 IIHF World Championship Division II consisted of two international ice hockey tournaments organized by the International Ice Hockey Federation. Divisions II A and II B represented the fourth and the fifth tier of the IIHF Ice Hockey World Championships.

Group A was scheduled to be held in Melbourne, Australia, but it was later moved to Serbia.

Netherlands won Group A and got promoted to Division I, while Israel was relegated. Georgia won Group B and got promoted, while Thailand was relegated to Division III.

== Group A tournament ==
2025 IIHF World Championship Division II A

Tournament details
- Host country: Serbia
- City: Belgrade
- Venue: 1 (in 1 host city)
- Dates: 29 April – 5 May
- Teams: 6

Tournament statistics
- Games played: 15
- Goals scored: 72 (4.8 per game)
- Attendance: 3,230 (215 per game)
- Scoring leader: (Netherlands) Guus van Nes (12 points)

Official website
- Website

The Division II Group A tournament was played in Belgrade, Serbia from 29 April to 5 May 2025.

=== Participating teams ===
Team	Qualification
Netherlands	Placed 6th in Division I B in 2024 and was relegated.
Serbia	Hosts; placed 2nd in Division II A in 2024.
United Arab Emirates	Placed 3rd in Division II A in 2024.
Israel	Placed 4th in Division II A in 2024.
Australia	Placed 5th in Division II A in 2024.
Belgium	Placed 1st in Division II B in 2024 and was promoted.

=== Match officials ===
Six referees and seven linesmen were selected for the tournament.

Referees	Linesmen
(Czech Republic) Jakub Šindel; (Germany) Bastian Steingroß; (Italy) Federico Giacomozzi; (Latvia) Uldis Bušs; (Slovakia) Tomáš Hronský; (Spain) Alexey Roshchyn	(Belgium) Frederic Monnaie; (China) Fu Dahe; (Denmark) Andreas Krøyer; (France) Johan Fauvel; (Italy) Lukas Fleischmann; (Serbia) Uroš Mladenović; (Serbia) Matija Nikolić

=== Standings ===
Pos	Team	Pld	W	OTW	OTL	L	GF	GA	GD	Pts	Promotion or relegation
1	Netherlands	5	5	0	0	0	25	4	+21	15	Promoted to the 2026 Division I B
2	Serbia (H)	5	4	0	0	1	12	5	+7	12	
3	United Arab Emirates	5	2	0	0	3	14	13	+1	6 (Note: United Arab Emirates 8–0 Belgium)	
4	Belgium	5	2	0	0	3	5	17	−12	6	
5	Australia	5	1	0	0	4	7	17	−10	3 (Note: Israel 3–4 Australia)	
6	Israel	5	1	0	0	4	9	16	−7	3	Relegated to the 2026 Division II B

Source: IIHF
Rules for classification: 1) points; 2) head-to-head points; 3) head-to-head goal difference; 4) head-to-head number of goals scored; 5) result against closest best-ranked team outside tied teams; 6) result against second-best ranked team outside tied teams; 7) seeding before tournament.
(H) Host

=== Results ===
All times are local (UTC+2).

29 April 2025; 12:30	Belgium	2–0 (1–0, 0–0, 1–0)	Israel	Pionir Ice Hall, Belgrade; Attendance: 27

Game reference
Jelle Lievens	Goalies	Maksim Kaliaev	Referees: (Italy) Federico Giacomozzi (Germany) Bastian Steingroß; Linesmen: (France) Johan Fauvel (Serbia) Matija Nikolić
Auger (Verelst, Gyesbreghs) (SH) – 15:28 / 1–0; Delport (Schoovaerts) – 54:45 / 2–0			Referees: (Italy) Federico Giacomozzi (Germany) Bastian Steingroß; Linesmen: (France) Johan Fauvel (Serbia) Matija Nikolić
12 min	Penalties	10 min	Referees: (Italy) Federico Giacomozzi (Germany) Bastian Steingroß; Linesmen: (France) Johan Fauvel (Serbia) Matija Nikolić
38	Shots	30	Referees: (Italy) Federico Giacomozzi (Germany) Bastian Steingroß; Linesmen: (France) Johan Fauvel (Serbia) Matija Nikolić

29 April 2025; 16:00	United Arab Emirates	0–5 (0–1, 0–2, 0–2)	Netherlands	Pionir Ice Hall, Belgrade; Attendance: 46

Game reference

Konstantin Belomoev
Goalies
Cedrick Andree
Referees:
(Slovakia) Tomáš Hronský
(Czech Republic) Jakub Šindel
Linesmen:
(Denmark) Andreas Krøyer
(Serbia) Uroš Mladenović

0–1	03:51 – Borgman (Van Nes, Verkiel)
0–2	30:32 – Hessels (Bison, Van der Schuit)
0–3	35:08 – Van Nes (Joly, Andree)
0–4	49:01 – Hessels (Van der Schuit, De Bruijn) (PP)
0–5	59:08 – Bison (Muller, Hessels)

6 min
Penalties
4 min
13
Shots
52

29 April 2025; 19:30	Serbia	3–0 (1–0, 1–0, 1–0)	Australia	Pionir Ice Hall, Belgrade; Attendance: 527

Game reference

Akim Padalitsa
Goalies
Aleksi Toivonen
Referees:
(Latvia) Uldis Bušs
(Spain) Alexey Roshchyn
Linesmen:
(Italy) Lukas Fleischmann
(Belgium) Frederic Monnaie

Gvozdenović (Subotić, Vučurević) (PP) – 13:19	1–0
Leštarić (Dragović) – 24:01	2–0
Gvozdenović (SH, EN) – 58:16	3–0

16 min
Penalties
8 min
34
Shots
16

30 April 2025; 12:30	Netherlands	6–2 (2–1, 3–1, 1–0)	Israel	Pionir Ice Hall, Belgrade; Attendance: 37

Game reference

Ruud Leeuwesteijn
Goalies
Maksim Kaliaev
Referees:
(Latvia) Uldis Bušs
(Spain) Alexey Roshchyn
Linesmen:
(China) Fu Dahe
(Serbia) Matija Nikolić

Hessels (Van der Schuit, Bison) – 01:32	1–0
	1–1	02:13 – I. Ben Tov (Khubashvili, A. Ben Tov)
Verkiel (PS) – 15:18	2–1
Van Nes (Joly, Borgman) (PP2) – 24:52	3–1
Joly (Van Nes, De Bruijn) (PP) – 27:16	4–1
	4–2	36:57 – Goldshtein (Kozev, Khvoles) (PP)
Hessels (SH) – 39:40	5–2
Stempher (Van Nes, Joly) (PP) – 56:55	6–2

24 min
Penalties
61 min
52
Shots
26

30 April 2025; 16:00	Australia	1–3 (0–0, 1–1, 0–2)	Belgium	Pionir Ice Hall, Belgrade; Attendance: 29

Game reference

Alex Tetreault
Goalies
Jelle Lievens
Referees:
(Slovakia) Tomáš Hronský
(Czech Republic) Jakub Šindel
Linesmen:
(Italy) Lukas Fleischmann
(Serbia) Uroš Mladenović

Hawes (Todd) – 20:37	1–0
	1–1	26:06 – Auger (Boni)
	1–2	52:22 – Gyesbreghs (James, Steyaert) (PP)
	1–3	54:48 – Auger (Steyaert, Gyesbreghs)

10 min
Penalties
8 min
20
Shots
30

30 April 2025; 19:30	Serbia	4–1 (0–1, 1–0, 3–0)	United Arab Emirates	Pionir Ice Hall, Belgrade; Attendance: 326

Game reference

Akim Padalitsa
Goalies
Konstantin Belomoev
Referees:
(Italy) Federico Giacomozzi
(Germany) Bastian Steingroß
Linesmen:
(Denmark) Andreas Krøyer
(Belgium) Frederic Monnaie

	0–1	11:13 – Klavdiev (Glukhikh, Chuikov)
Tomašević (Popović) (SH) – 24:32	1–1
Đumić (Tomašević, Pećerić) – 51:31	2–1
Đumić (Popović, Anić) – 54:27	3–1
Tomašević (EN) – 58:16	4–1

13 min
Penalties
4 min
56
Shots
27

2 May 2025; 12:30	Netherlands	5–1 (2–1, 1–0, 2–0)	Australia	Pionir Ice Hall, Belgrade; Attendance: 42

Game reference

Cedrick Andree
Goalies
Aleksi Toivonen
Referees:
(Italy) Federico Giacomozzi
(Spain) Alexey Roshchyn
Linesmen:
(Denmark) Andreas Krøyer
(Serbia) Matija Nikolić

	0–1	10:30 – Kubara (Todd, Hawes) (PP)
Borgman (Hessels) – 10:58	1–1
Van Nes (Stempher, Joly) – 14:48	2–1
Joly (Borgman, Stempher) – 23:39	3–1
Van Nes (Joly, Stempher) – 55:29	4–1
Van Nes (SH) – 59:40	5–1

12 min
Penalties
14 min
30
Shots
11

2 May 2025; 16:00	United Arab Emirates	2–3 (1–2, 0–0, 1–1)	Israel	Pionir Ice Hall, Belgrade; Attendance: 29

Game reference

Konstantin Belomoev
Goalies
Maksim Kaliaev
Referees:
(Czech Republic) Jakub Šindel
(Germany) Bastian Steingroß
Linesmen:
(Serbia) Uroš Mladenović
(Belgium) Frederic Monnaie

Badegyev (R. Korchokha, E. Korchokha) – 08:30	1–0
	1–1	15:35 – Khvoles (Levin, Kaliaev) (PP)
	1–2	19:35 – Mazour (Lukin, Polozov)
Shapavalau (Klavdiev, Glukhikh) (PP2) – 44:32	2–2
	2–3	41:33 – Levin (Mazour, Goldshtein)

6 min
Penalties
10 min
37
Shots
34

2 May 2025; 19:30	Serbia	2–0 (0–0, 1–0, 1–0)	Belgium	Pionir Ice Hall, Belgrade; Attendance: 416

Game reference
Akim Padalitsa	Goalies	Jelle Lievens	Referees: (Latvia) Uldis Bušs (Slovakia) Tomáš Hronský; Linesmen: (France) Johan Fauvel (China) Fu Dahe
Popović (Đumić) – 21:06 / 1–0; Kravljanac (EN) – 58:26 / 2–0			Referees: (Latvia) Uldis Bušs (Slovakia) Tomáš Hronský; Linesmen: (France) Johan Fauvel (China) Fu Dahe
10 min	Penalties	10 min	Referees: (Latvia) Uldis Bušs (Slovakia) Tomáš Hronský; Linesmen: (France) Johan Fauvel (China) Fu Dahe
37	Shots	17	Referees: (Latvia) Uldis Bušs (Slovakia) Tomáš Hronský; Linesmen: (France) Johan Fauvel (China) Fu Dahe

3 May 2025; 12:30	Australia	1–3 (1–1, 0–1, 0–1)	United Arab Emirates	Pionir Ice Hall, Belgrade; Attendance: 19

Game reference

Alex Tetreault
Goalies
Konstantin Belomoev
Referees:
(Italy) Federico Giacomozzi
(Slovakia) Tomáš Hronský
Linesmen:
(France) Johan Fauvel
(Serbia) Matija Nikolić

	0–1	12:35 – Kuznetsov (Chuikov, McLlwain)
Webster (Todd, Steven) (EA) - 19:01	1–1
	1–2	25:42 – Nikitin
	1–3	42:41 – Kuznetsov (Chuikov, Nikitin)

0 min
Penalties
10 min
44
Shots
28

3 May 2025; 16:00	Belgium	0–6 (0–2, 0–3, 0–1)	Netherlands	Pionir Ice Hall, Belgrade; Attendance: 47

Game reference

Jelle Lievens
Stijn Raeymaekers
Goalies
Martijn Oosterwijk
Referees:
(Latvia) Uldis Bušs
(Germany) Bastian Steingroß
Linesmen:
(Italy) Lukas Fleischmann
(Serbia) Uroš Mladenović

0–1	09:02 – Van Nes (Joly, Stempher)
0–2	10:55 – Hessels (Van Gorp, Bison)
0–3	23:28 – Schoningh (Verkiel)
0–4	32:40 – Van der Schuit (Bison, Hessels)
0–5	38:33 – Van Nes (Joly, Verkiel) (PP)
0–6	48:43 – Sars (Loginov) (SH)

14 min
Penalties
16 min
21
Shots
42

3 May 2025; 19:30	Israel	1–2 (0–0, 1–1, 0–1)	Serbia	Pionir Ice Hall, Belgrade; Attendance: 388

Game reference

Maksim Kaliaev
Goalies
Akim Padalitsa
Referees:
(Spain) Alexey Roshchyn
(Czech Republic) Jakub Šindel
Linesmen:
(China) Fu Dahe
(Denmark) Andreas Krøyer

Goldshtein (Zitserman, Kozhevnikov) (PP) – 25:25	1–0
	1–1	28:22 – Leštarić (Đumić, Tomašević)
	1–2	46:18 – Leštarić (Đumić, Tomašević)

10 min
Penalties
8 min
26
Shots
43

5 May 2025; 12:30	United Arab Emirates	8–0 (4–0, 1–0, 3–0)	Belgium	Pionir Ice Hall, Belgrade; Attendance: 23

Game reference

Konstantion Belomoev
Goalies
Stijn Raeymaekers
Jelle Lievens
Referees:
(Latvia) Uldis Bušs
(Spain) Alexey Roshchyn
Linesmen:
(China) Fu Dahe
(Serbia) Matija Nikolić

McLlwain (Kuznetsov, Chuikov) – 08:10	1–0
McLlwain (Chuikov, Kuznetsov) – 09:46	2–0
R. Korchokha (Chuikov) – 10:36	3–0
Klavdiev (Chuikov) – 14:18	4–0
Chuikov – 23:33	5–0
Chuikov (Nikitin, McLlwain) – 45:35	6–0
Binsammoud (Glukhikh) – 48:20	7–0
Klavdiev (Binsammoud, Badegyev) – 58:33	8–0

6 min
Penalties
10 min
35
Shots
43

5 May 2025; 16:00	Israel	3–4 (0–2, 0–1, 3–1)	Australia	Pionir Ice Hall, Belgrade

Game reference

Maksim Kaliaev
Yehonatan Reisinger
Goalies
Aleksi Toivonen
Referees:
(Slovakia) Tomáš Hronský
(Germany) Bastian Steingroß
Linesmen:
(France) Johan Fauvel
(Denmark) Andreas Krøyer

	0–1	14:54 – Lyashenko (Webster)
	0–2	19:11 – Webster (C. Kubara) (PP)
	0–3	23:57 – Webster (Taylor, Boyle) (PP)
	0–4	40:18 – Chen (Funes, Todd)
Segal – 41:43	1–4
Mazour (Kozhevnikov, Levin) (PP) – 45:39	2–4
Polozov (Kozhevinkov, Levin) – 54:49	3–4

14 min
Penalties
10 min
38
Shots
25

5 May 2025; 19:30	Netherlands	3–1 (1–1, 0–0, 2–0)	Serbia	Pionir Ice Hall, Belgrade; Attendance: 877

Game reference

Cedrick Andree
Goalies
Akim Padalitsa
Referees:
(Italy) Federico Giacomozzi
(Czech Republic) Jakub Šindel
Linesmen:
(Italy) Lukas Fleischmann
(Belgium) Frederic Monnaie

Joly (Van Nes, Stempher) – 02:40	1–0
	1–1	09:21 – Đumić (Dragović)
Joly (Verkiel, Van Nes) – 45:15	2–1
Hessels (Joly) – 59:21	3–1

6 min
Penalties
4 min
31
Shots
32

=== Statistics ===
==== Scoring leaders ====
List shows the top skaters sorted by points, then goals.

Player	GP	G	A	Pts	+/−	PIM	POS
(Netherlands) Guus van Nes	5	7	5	12	+8	4	F
(Netherlands) D'Artagnan Joly	5	4	8	12	+6	2	F
(Netherlands) Delaney Hessels	5	6	3	9	+8	2	F
(United Arab Emirates) Ilia Chuikov	5	2	7	9	+6	0	F
(Serbia) Mirko Đumić	5	3	3	6	+4	2	F
(Netherlands) Danny Stempher	5	1	5	6	+6	4	F
(Serbia) Danilo Tomašević	5	2	3	5	+7	0	F
(Netherlands) Bartek Bison	5	1	4	5	+7	8	F
(Netherlands) Jordy Verkiel	5	1	4	5	+6	2	D
(United Arab Emirates) Artem Klavdiev	5	3	1	4	+6	0	F
(Australia) Kieren Webster	5	3	1	4	0	2	F

GP = Games played; G = Goals; A = Assists; Pts = Points; +/− = Plus/Minus; PIM = Penalties in Minutes; POS = Position
Source: IIHF.com

==== Goaltending leaders ====
Only the top five goaltenders, based on save percentage, who have played at least 40% of their team's minutes, are included in this list.

Player	TOI	GA	GAA	SA	Sv%	SO
(Netherlands) Cedrick Andree	180:00	2	0.67	56	96.43	1
(Serbia) Akim Padalitsa	298:45	5	1.00	117	95.73	2
(United Arab Emirates) Konstantin Belomoev	296:51	12	2.43	227	94.71	1
(Israel) Maksim Kaliaev	277:24	16	3.46	191	91.62	0
(Belgium) Jelle Lievens	233:32	11	2.83	125	91.20	1

TOI = time on ice (minutes:seconds); SA = shots against; GA = goals against; GAA = goals against average; Sv% = save percentage; SO = shutouts
Source: IIHF.com

=== Awards ===
Position	Player
Goaltender	(Serbia) Akim Padalitsa
Defenceman	(Netherlands) Björn Borgman
Forward	(Netherlands) Guus van Nes

== Group B tournament ==
2025 IIHF World Championship Division II B

Tournament details
- Host country: New Zealand
- City: Dunedin
- Venue: 1 (in 1 host city)
- Dates: 27 April – 3 May
- Teams: 6

Tournament statistics
- Games played: 15
- Goals scored: 118 (7.87 per game)
- Attendance: 5,745 (383 per game)
- Scoring leader: (Bulgaria) Daniel Dilkov (14 points)

Official website
- Website

The Division II Group B tournament was played in Dunedin, New Zealand from 27 April to 3 May 2025.

=== Participating teams ===
Team	Qualification
Iceland	Placed 6th in Division II A in 2024 and was relegated.
New Zealand	Hosts; placed 2nd in Division II B in 2024.
Georgia	Placed 3rd in Division II B in 2024.
Bulgaria	Placed 4th in Division II B in 2024.
Chinese Taipei	Placed 5th in Division II B in 2024.
Thailand	Placed 1st in Division III A in 2024 and was promoted.

=== Match officials ===
Four referees and seven linesmen were selected for the tournament.

Referees	Linesmen
(Belgium) Niki De Herdt; (Denmark) Rasmus Ankersen; (Netherlands) Jeroen Klijberg; (Norway) Christian Persson	(Australia) Hamish Young; (Belgium) Thibo Christiaens; (Czech Republic) Miroslav Lhotský; (Netherlands) Lowewijk Beelen; (New Zealand) Richard Button; (New Zealand) Tyler Haslemore; (United Arab Emirates) Ahmed Al-Farsi

=== Standings ===
Pos	Team	Pld	W	OTW	OTL	L	GF	GA	GD	Pts	Promotion or relegation
1	Georgia	5	4	1	0	0	35	9	+26	14	Promoted to the 2026 Division II A
2	Iceland	5	4	0	0	1	21	13	+8	12	
3	New Zealand (H)	5	3	0	0	2	14	14	0	9	
4	Bulgaria	5	1	1	1	2	23	26	−3	6	
5	Chinese Taipei	5	1	0	1	3	14	16	−2	4	
6	Thailand	5	0	0	0	5	11	40	−29	0	Relegated to the 2026 Division III A

Source: IIHF
Rules for classification: 1) points; 2) head-to-head points; 3) head-to-head goal difference; 4) head-to-head number of goals scored; 5) result against closest best-ranked team outside tied teams; 6) result against second-best ranked team outside tied teams; 7) seeding before tournament.
(H) Host

=== Results ===
All times are local (UTC+12).

27 April 2025; 13:00	Thailand	3–5 (2–1, 0–3, 1–1)	Bulgaria	Dunedin Ice Stadium, Dunedin; Attendance: 170

Game reference

Benjamin Kleineschay
Goalies
Dimitar Dimitrov
Referee:
(Denmark) Rasmus Ankersen
Linesmen:
(New Zealand) Richard Button
(New Zealand) Tyler Haslemore

	0–1	12:53 – Dilkov (K. Dikov) (PP)
Kindborn (Isaksson, Lampson) – 17:21	1–1
Limpanyakul (Forstner) – 18:26	2–1
	2–2	37:37 – Stanimirov (Atanasov)
	2–3	38:10 – Zaleev (Vasilev, Dilkov)
	2–4	38:30 – Tchalyiov
Lampson (Isaksson, Yannakornthanapunt) – 56:53	3–4
	3–5	58:48 – Georgiev (Dilkov, Zaleev)

41 min
Penalties
6 min
43
Shots
40

27 April 2025; 16:30	Georgia	4–0 (1–0, 3–0, 0–0)	Iceland	Dunedin Ice Stadium, Dunedin; Attendance: 350

Game reference

Ivan Starostin
Goalies
Helgi Ívarsson
Referee:
(Norway) Christian Persson
Linesmen:
(Netherlands) Lowewijk Beelen
(Czech Republic) Miroslav Lhotský

Bukiya (Besharov) – 04:37	1–0
Bukiya (Ermoshenko, Besharov) – 27:58	2–0
Besharov (Ermoshenko) (PP) – 30:16	3–0
Bukiya (Gavrilenko, Davydov) (PP) – 32:44	4–0

10 min
Penalties
16 min
35
Shots
11

27 April 2025; 20:00	New Zealand	3–1 (1–0, 1–1, 1–0)	Chinese Taipei	Dunedin Ice Stadium, Dunedin; Attendance: 700

Game reference

Aston Brookes
Goalies
Hsiao Po-yu
Referee:
(Belgium) Niki De Herdt
Linesmen:
(Belgium) Thibo Christiaens
(Australia) Hamish Young

Dalmatau (Simon, Audas) – 18:14	1–0
Carey – 24:44	2–0
	2–1	25:35 – Wu (Shen)
McIntosh (SH, EN) – 59:25	3–1

8 min
Penalties
18 min
43
Shots
36

28 April 2025; 13:00	Iceland	8–4 (5–1, 1–3, 2–0)	Bulgaria	Dunedin Ice Stadium, Dunedin; Attendance: 50

Game reference

Róbert Steingrimsson
Goalies
Andrea Karabadjakov
Referee:
(Netherlands) Jeroen Klijberg
Linesmen:
(Netherlands) Lowewijk Beelen
(New Zealand) Tyler Haslemore

Leifsson (Pálsson, Rúnarsson) (PP) – 08:18	1–0
Rúnarsson (Hlynsson, H. Jóhannsson) (PP) – 18:05	2–0
Sigrúnarson (Mikaelsson, H. Jóhannsson) – 18:25	3–0
Blöndal (Karvelsson, Stefánsson) – 18:43	4–0
	4–1	19:16 – Hodulov (V. Dikov, Nakov)
K. Jóhannsson (Hlynsson]) – 19:44	5–1
Sigrúnarson (Rúnarsson, Leifsson) (PP) – 25:55	6–1
	6–2	32:18 – Zaleev (Hodulov, Dilkov) (PP)
	6–3	33:36 – Hodulov (Dilkov, K. Dikov) (PP)
	6–4	35:59 – Hodulov (Vasilev) (PP)
Mojzyszek (Hlynsson, Pálsson) – 55:07	7–4
Rúnarsson (Leifsson, K. Jóhannsson) (EN) – 59:29	8–4

39 min
Penalties
18 min
45
Shots
25

28 April 2025; 16:30	Chinese Taipei	7–3 (1–1, 4–2, 2–0)	Thailand	Dunedin Ice Stadium, Dunedin; Attendance: 100

Game reference

Hsiao Po-yu
Goalies
Benjamin Kleineschay
Referee:
(Norway) Christian Persson
Linesmen:
(United Arab Emirates) Ahmed Al-Farsi
(Australia) Hamish Young

Lin Yi. (Chi) (PP) – 05:24	1–0
	1–1	16:12 – Kindborn (Isaksson) (PP)
Wang P. (Peng) – 23:31	2–1
Lin Yo. (Wen) – 29:27	3–1
	3–2	33:51 – Kindborn (PP2)
Lin Yo. (Lin C.) (PP2) – 34:04	4–2
	4–3	34:33 – Isaksson (Kindborn) (PP)
Lin Yi. – 36:49	5–3
Shen (Lin Yo.) (PP2) – 51:46	6–3
Lin Yi. – 59:45	7–3

39 min
Penalties
18 min
59
Shots
21

28 April 2025; 20:00	New Zealand	0–5 (0–2, 0–2, 0–1)	Georgia	Dunedin Ice Stadium, Dunedin; Attendance: 650

Game reference

Aston Brookes
Goalies
Ivan Starostin
Referee:
(Denmark) Rasmus Ankersen
Linesmen:
(Belgium) Thibo Christiaens
(Czech Republic) Miroslav Lhotský

0–1	15:06 – Besharov (Davydov, Gavrilenko)
0–2	18:49 – Nikishanin (Kurbatov, Metliuk)
0–3	28:36 – Metliuk (Nikishanin, Kurbatov)
0–4	29:27 – Besharov (Bukiya, Davydov)
0–5	57:55 – Davydov (Gavrilenko, Nikishanin) (PP)

10 min
Penalties
10 min
29
Shots
42

30 April 2025; 13:00	Iceland	2–1 (1–1, 0–0, 1–0)	Chinese Taipei	Dunedin Ice Stadium, Dunedin; Attendance: 40

Game reference

Helgi Ívarsson
Goalies
Hsiao Po-yu
Referee:
(Belgium) Niki De Herdt
Linesmen:
(Belgium) Thibo Christiaens
(Australia) Hamish Young

Kristjánsson (Sverrisson, Arason) (PP) – 05:57	1–0
	1–1	19:00 – Peng (Pan, Lin Yo.) (PP)
Hlynsson (Leifsson) – 43:30	2–1

8 min
Penalties
14 min
47
Shots
23

30 April 2025; 16:30	Georgia	8–7 OT (0–2, 5–1, 2–4) (OT: 1–0)	Bulgaria	Dunedin Ice Stadium, Dunedin; Attendance: 70

Game reference

Mikhail Fofanov
Ivan Starostin
Goalies
Dimitar Dimitrov
Andrea Karabadjakov
Referee:
(Netherlands) Jeroen Klijberg
Linesmen:
(New Zealand) Richard Button
(New Zealand) Tyler Haslemore

	0–1	05:52 – Hodulov (Nakov, V. Dikov)
	0–2	09:13 – Georgiev (Dilkov)
	0–3	21:10 – Zaleev
Karelin (Metliuk, Nikishanin) – 23:46	1–3
Bukiya (Davydov, Besharov) – 24:06	2–3
Gavrilenko (Nikishanin, Metliuk) – 25:03	3–3
Nikishanin (Metliuk) (SH) – 29:06	4–3
Bukiya (Gavrilenko, Besharov) – 33:15	5–3
	5–4	40:56 – Vasilev (Dilkov, Zaleev)
	5–5	46:01 – Hodulov (SH)
Nikishanin (Karelin, Metliuk) (PP2) – 46:53	6–5
Nikishanin (Kurbatov, Obolgogiani) – 48:55	7–5
	7–6	52:23 – Zaleev (Dilkov)
	7–7	56:49 – Vasilev (Dilkov, Georgiev) (PP)
Kochkin – 63:52	8–7

14 min
Penalties
12 min
55
Shots
28

30 April 2025; 20:00	New Zealand	7–1 (1–0, 1–1, 5–0)	Thailand	Dunedin Ice Stadium, Dunedin; Attendance: 800

Game reference

Csaba Kercso-Magos
Goalies
Benjamin Kleineschay
Pattarapol Ungkulpattanasuk
Referee:
(Denmark) Rasmus Ankersen
Linesmen:
(United Arab Emirates) Ahmed Al-Farsi
(Netherlands) Lowewijk Beelen

McIntosh (Audas, Eaden) – 15:43	1–0
	1–1	34:56 – Isaksson (Lampson, Kindborn) (PP)
Frear (Daigle) – 36:40	2–1
Carey (Eaden) – 40:57	3–1
Audas (McIntosh, McIntosh) (PP2) – 48:49	4–1
Amston (Challis, Frear (PP) – 49:30	5–1
Orr (Audas, Hayward) – 49:44	6–1
Eaden (McIntosh) – 50:45	7–1

8 min
Penalties
8 min
56
Shots
25

2 May 2025; 13:00	Chinese Taipei	1–3 (1–2, 0–0, 0–1)	Georgia	Dunedin Ice Stadium, Dunedin; Attendance: 45

Game reference

Hsiao Po-yu
Goalies
Ivan Starostin
Referee:
(Netherlands) Jeroen Klijberg
Linesmen:
(United Arab Emirates) Ahmed Al-Farsi
(New Zealand) Tyler Haslemore

	0–1	07:02 – Gavrilenko (Davydov, Nikishanin) (PP)
	0–2	13:00 – Romanov (Metliuk, Nikishanin) (PP)
Yang (Wen) – 17:25	1–2
	1–3	46:38 – Nikishanin (Karelin, Kurbatov) (PP)

12 min
Penalties
8 min
22
Shots
44

2 May 2025; 16:30	Thailand	3–6 (0–0, 2–3, 1–3)	Iceland	Dunedin Ice Stadium, Dunedin; Attendance: 120

Game reference

Benjamin Kleineschay
Goalies
Helgi Ívarsson
Referee:
(Norway) Christian Persson
Linesmen:
(New Zealand) Richard Button
(Belgium) Thibo Christiaens

Lampson (Yannakornthanapunt, Isaksson) (PP) – 20:52	1–0
	1–1	27:53 – Hlynsson (Sigrúnarson) (PP)
Forstner (Lampson, Kindborn) (PP) – 30:15	2–1
	2–2	35:58 – Rúnarsson (Stefánsson)
	2–3	37:37 – Leifsson (Hlynsson, Rúnarsson)
Kindborn (Isaksson, Lampson) – 44:01	3–3
	3–4	48:42 – Rúnarsson (Leifsson) (PP)
	3–5	54:42 – Leifsson (K. Jóhannsson)
	3–6	59:18 – Hlynsson (Rúnarsson) (EN)

12 min
Penalties
16 min
31
Shots
43

2 May 2025; 20:00	Bulgaria	2–3 (1–1, 1–1, 0–1)	New Zealand	Dunedin Ice Stadium, Dunedin; Attendance: 1,000

Game reference

Dimitar Dimitrov
Goalies
Csaba Kercso-Magos
Referee:
(Belgium) Niki De Herdt
Linesmen:
(Czech Republic) Miroslav Lhotský
(Australia) Hamish Young

V. Dikov (Dilkov, Hodulov) (PP2) – 17:51	1–0
	1–1	18:40 – McIntosh (Sandoy, Carey)
	1–2	24:33 – Regan (Eaden, Ruski-Jones)
Vasilev (Zaleev, Dilkov) (PP) – 27:27	2–2
	2–3	57:31 – Daigle (McIntosh) (PP2)

10 min
Penalties
12 min
34
Shots
49

3 May 2025; 13:00	Georgia	15–1 (5–0, 5–0, 5–1)	Thailand	Dunedin Ice Stadium, Dunedin; Attendance: 150

Game reference

Ivan Starostin
Mikhail Fofanov
Goalies
Pattarapol Ungkulpattanasuk
Referee:
(Norway) Christian Persson
Linesmen:
(New Zealand) Richard Button
(New Zealand) Tyler Haslemore

Gavrilenko (Besharov) (PP) – 04:25	1–0
Kozyulin – 04:47	2–0
Metliuk (Karelin) – 05:08	3–0
Davydov (Besharov, Bukiya) – 08:51	4–0
Kozyulin (Kireev) – 09:56	5–0
Besharov (Gavrilenko) – 20:57	6–0
Nikishanin (Karelin, Romanov) (PP) – 27:16	7–0
Davydov (Bukiya, Kurbatov) (SH) – 32:07	8–0
Kozyulin (Kochkin) – 36:43	9–0
Davydov (PS) – 39:31	10–0
Besharov (Bukiya, Gavrilenko) – 41:47	11–0
	11–1	44:47 – Isaksson (Lampson, Kindborn) (PP)
Davydov (Karelin, Kurbatov) (PP) – 49:27	12–1
Kireev (Kozyulin, Kharizov) – 55:11	13–1
Shvetsov (Mumladze) – 55:39	14–1
Kochkin (Kozyulin, Obolgogiani) – 56:40	15–1

8 min
Penalties
8 min
66
Shots
22

3 May 2025; 16:30	Bulgaria	5–4 OT (2–1, 0–0, 2–3) (OT: 1–0)	Chinese Taipei	Dunedin Ice Stadium, Dunedin; Attendance: 500

Game reference

Andrea Karabadjakov
Goalies
Lee Yi-cheng
Referee:
(Denmark) Rasmus Ankersen
Linesmen:
(United Arab Emirates) Ahmed Al-Farsi
(Australia) Hamish Young

Zaleev (Vasilev, Dilkov) – 07:40	1–0
Vasilev (Dilkov) (SH) – 12:45	2–0
	2–1	15:59 – Peng (PP)
Georgiev (Dilkov, Vasilev) – 47:31	3–1
	3–2	52:51 – Li
	3–3	54:09 – Lin Yi. (Lin J.)
	3–4	57:32 – Lin Yi.
V. Dikov (K. Dikov, Nakov) (EA) – 59:36	4–4
Hodulov – 60:52	5–4

26 min
Penalties
2 min
26
Shots
44

3 May 2025; 20:00	Iceland	5–1 (4–0, 0–1, 1–0)	New Zealand	Dunedin Ice Stadium, Dunedin; Attendance: 1,000

Game reference

Helgi Ívarsson
Goalies
Aston Brookes
Referee:
(Netherlands) Jeroen Klijberg
Linesmen:
(Netherlands) Lowewijk Beelen
(Czech Republic) Miroslav Lhotský

Rúnarsson (Hlynsson, Leifsson) – 03:50	1–0
Sverrisson (Hjálmarsson) – 04:26	2–0
Skúlason (Hlynsson, Blöndal) – 08:05	3–0
Leifsson (Hlynsson, Sigrúnarson) (PP) – 13:43	4–0
	4–1	35:38 – Carey (Eaden, McIntosh)
Rúnarsson (Arason) – 56:41	5–1

8 min
Penalties
46 min
34
Shots
23

=== Statistics ===
==== Scoring leaders ====
List shows the top skaters sorted by points, then goals.

Player	GP	G	A	Pts	+/−	PIM	POS
(Bulgaria) Daniel Dilkov	5	1	13	14	−2	2	F
(Georgia (country)) Makar Nikishanin	5	6	6	12	+1	2	F
(Georgia (country)) Timur Besharov	5	5	6	11	+7	2	F
(Georgia (country)) Danil Davydov	5	5	6	11	+9	12	F
(Iceland) Unnar Rúnarsson	5	6	4	10	+6	2	F
(Georgia (country)) Nikita Bukiya	5	5	4	9	+9	4	F
(Iceland) Johann Leifsson	5	4	5	9	+5	2	F
(Georgia (country)) Konstantin Gavrilenko	5	3	6	9	+8	0	D
(Iceland) Viggó Hlynsson	5	3	6	9	+7	2	F
(Bulgaria) Emil Zaleev	5	5	3	8	−5	6	F

GP = Games played; G = Goals; A = Assists; Pts = Points; +/− = Plus/Minus; PIM = Penalties in Minutes; POS = Position
Source: IIHF.com

==== Goaltending leaders ====
Only the top five goaltenders, based on save percentage, who have played at least 40% of their team's minutes, are included in this list.

Player	TOI	GA	GAA	SA	Sv%	SO
(New Zealand) Csaba Kercso-Magos	120:00	3	1.50	59	94.92	0
(Georgia (country)) Ivan Starostin	263:52	6	1.36	99	93.94	2
(Chinese Taipei) Hsiao Po-yu	239:05	10	2.51	154	93.51	0
(Iceland) Helgi Ívarsson	240:00	9	2.25	112	91.96	0
(Bulgaria) Dimitar Dimitrov	139:30	10	4.30	112	91.07	0

TOI = time on ice (minutes:seconds); SA = shots against; GA = goals against; GAA = goals against average; Sv% = save percentage; SO = shutouts
Source: IIHF.com

=== Awards ===
Position	Player
Goaltender	(Chinese Taipei) Hsiao Po-yu
Defenceman	(New Zealand) Justin Daigle
Forward	(Georgia (country)) Makar Nikishanin
