= Wakatipu Wild =

- City: Queenstown, Otago
- League: New Zealand Women's Ice Hockey League
- Founded: September 2020 (5 years ago)
- Operated: 2020–present
- Home arena: Queenstown Ice Arena
- Colours: Yellow, blue, white
- General manager: (New Zealand) Rebecca Dobson
- Head coach: Colin McIntosh
- Captain: Kellye Nelson
- Website: Wakatipu-wild.com

Franchise history
- 2020–present: Wakatipu Wild

Championships
- Premierships: 1 (2022)
- Championships: 1 (2022)

The Wakatipu Wild is a New Zealand amateur ice hockey team from Queenstown, Otago, New Zealand. Founded in 2020, the Wild are a member of the New Zealand Women's Ice Hockey League (NZWIHL). The Wild are based at Queenstown Ice Arena, located at Queenstown Gardens. Wakatipu are one time NZWIHL champions and premiers.

== History ==
The Wakatipu Wild was founded in 2020 and applied and joined the New Zealand Women's Ice Hockey League (NZWIHL). The Wild was established to bring women of all ages and nationalities together to further the development of woman's ice hockey locally in central Otago and nationally in New Zealand. Wakatipu appointed Rebecca Dobson as their maiden general manager and former Skycity Stampede player Colin McIntosh as head coach. The Wild's first ever game was played on 16 October 2020 against Otago rivals Dunedin Thunder on the road at Dunedin Ice Stadium. Young kiwi forward, Tallulah Bryant, scored the first ever goals for the Wild in the first period against Dunedin. Wakatipu doubled their lead in the second period before the Thunder pulled one goal back in the third. That third period goal proved a simple consolation as the wild won the game 2–1, for their first ever victory. Queenstown finished their first season in the NZWIHL in third place, qualifying for the bronze medal game in the NZWIHL Finals. The Wild won bronze in Finals on 1 November 2020 by defeating the Thunder 4–2. Wakatipu came from behind to claim their first Finals win, with American import and team captain, Kellye Nelson, scoring a hat-trick of goals over the course of the second and third periods.

Half way through the 2021 NZWIHL season, the Wild's second season, the league was cancelled due to the lock-downs implemented by the New Zealand Government during the COVID-19 pandemic. The team had started the season well with two wins from their first three games before the season cancellation.

In 2022, the Wild had a breakout season in their second full NZWIHL season. Rather than tournament style weekends, the league moved to a proper round-robin format that the Wild players enjoyed. Wakatipu almost went the entire season undefeated to finish top of the league standings a secure their first NZWIHL Premiership title. Queenstown followed up this success in the NZWIHL Finals with a big 7–2 victory over the Thunder in the semi-finals before being crowned Champions of New Zealand and winning goal medals with a 2–0 win over Canterbury Inferno in the grand final.

== All-time record ==
Wakatipu Wild all-time record
Season	Regular season											Finals									Top points scorer
Season	P	W	T	L	OW	OL	GF	GA	GD	Pts	Finish	P	W	L	GF	GA	Result	SF	BF	GF	Name	Points
2020	6	2	–	4	–	–	8	18	−10	6	3rd	1	1	–	4	2	Bronze	–	Won	–	(United States) Kellye Nelson	9
2021	2021 NZWIHL season was not completed and cancelled due to the COVID-19 pandemic^{1}
2022	6	5	–	–	–	1	33	7	+26	16	1st	2	2	–	9	2	Champion	Won	–	Won	(United States) Kellye Nelson	19
2023	–	–	–	–	–	–	–	–	–	–	–	–	–	–	–	–	–	–	–	–	–	–
Totals	12	7	–	4	0	1	41	25	+16			3	3	0	13	4

^{1} At the point of the 2021 season cancellation, the Wild had played three games, won twice, lost once, scored 15 goals and conceded eight goals.

Champions	Runners-up	Third place

== Championships ==
- Championships

(gold) Champions (1): 2022
(silver) Runners-up (0):

- Premierships

(gold) Premiers (1): 2022
(silver) Runner-up (0):

== Players ==
=== Current roster ===
Team roster for the 2022 NZWIHL season.

Wakatipu Wild roster - 2022 NZWIHL season
Active roster		Coaching staff
Goaltenders: 37 (New Zealand) Lilly Forbes; 1 (New Zealand) Sara Leadbetter; 78 (New Zealand) Danielle Strayer; 25 (New Zealand) Jordan Wichman; Defencemen: 27 (New Zealand) Lucy Boniface; 92 (New Zealand) Gracie Hellmrich; 33 (New Zealand) Kimberley Helmersson; 32 (New Zealand) Caitlin Hollyer; 11 (Canada) Alexandra Laframboise (I); 79 (New Zealand) Aoife Orr; 12 (New Zealand) Zanzee Pielak-Jones; 74 (New Zealand) Phaeora Sims	Forwards: 19 (Canada) Emma Ahvennie (I); 15 (United States) Amanda Albertson (I); 36 (New Zealand) Polly Bennetts; 23 (New Zealand) Tallulah Bryant; 18 (New Zealand) Gina Davis; 14 (New Zealand) Rebecca Dobson; 81 (Sweden) Lova Holmqvist (I); 8 (New Zealand) Inge Kemp; 17 (Canada) Coco Lund (I); 16 (New Zealand) Harriet Miller-Brown; 5 (New Zealand) Ella Mills; 2 (New Zealand) Gabrielle Mills; 22 (United States) Kellye Nelson (I) (C); 10 (Canada) Kristyn Ouimet (I); 48 (New Zealand) Manuella Pedrosa; 13 (Finland) Minna Ruski-Jones (I); 11 (New Zealand) Neve Spooner; 24 (New Zealand) Jessie Strain; 7 (New Zealand) Nicole Watts; 6 (Canada) Bobbie Weeks (I)	Head Coach: (Canada) Colin McIntosh; Coaches: (New Zealand) Dave Dubnick; (United States) Kellye Nelson; Legend (C) Captain (A) Alternate Captain (I) Import player Statistics; Average age: 21.3 years Average height: 167.4 cm Average weight: 64.1 kg
Last updated on: 25 February 2023
Elite Prospects

=== Player records ===
These are the top-five all-time/career player records in franchise history. Current as of 2022 NZWIHL season.

All-time Appearances
#	Name	Pos	GP
1	(United States) Kellye Nelson	F	13
2	(New Zealand) Gabrielle Mills	F	13
3	(New Zealand) Zanzee Pielak-Jones	D	13
4	(New Zealand) Caitlin Hollyer	D	13
5	(Canada) Emma Ahvennie	F	13

All-time Points
#	Name	Pos	Pts
1	(United States) Kellye Nelson	F	28
2	(Sweden) Lova Holmqvist	F	16
3	(New Zealand) Gabrielle Mills	F	10
4	(New Zealand) Gina Davis	F	9
5	(New Zealand) Zanzee Pielak-Jones	D	9

All-time Penalties
#	Name	Pos	PIM
1	(New Zealand) Gabrielle Mills	F	26
2	(Canada) Emma Ahvennie	F	16
3	(New Zealand) Tallulah Bryant	F	12
4	(New Zealand) Gracie Hellmrich	D	8
5	(New Zealand) Caitlin Hollyer	D	6

== Team staff ==
Current as of 2023 NZWIHL season.

Wild staff
Role	Name
Head coach	(Canada) Colin McIntosh
Assistant coach	(New Zealand) Dave Dubnick
Assistant coach	(United States) Kellye Nelson
General manager	(New Zealand) Rebecca Dobson

== Leaders ==
=== Team captains ===
The Wild have had one captain in the team's history.

No.	Name	Term
1	(United States) Kellye Nelson	2020–present

=== head coaches ===
The Wild have had one head coach in the team's history.

No.	Name	Term
1	(Canada) Colin McIntosh	2020–present

=== General managers ===
The Wild have had one general manager (GM) in the team's history.

No.	Name	Term
1	(New Zealand) Rebecca Dobson	2020–present

== Broadcasting ==
Current:

- YouTube (2020 – present) – The NZWIHL self broadcast league games live on YouTube on their official channel. Due to limited resources, not all games are broadcast.
