= Queenstown Ice Hockey Club =

Ice hockey club in New Zealand

The Queenstown Ice Hockey Club is the major ice hockey club in Queenstown, New Zealand.

Ice Hockey has been played in Queenstown since 1938. Queenstown now has a new rink in the Queenstown Gardens. Teams compete in the Southern Ice Hockey League against the Dunedin Ice Hockey Association, Alexandra Ice Hockey Club, Maniototo Ice Hockey Club, Gore Ice Hockey Club and sometimes the Albury Ice Hockey Club. The teams compete in a round robin type series, which is often won by the Rangers, the local Queenstown team. Players play for two teams, Queenstown white and blue.

Many members of the Queenstown Ice Hockey Club are on the New Zealand national teams the "Ice Blacks" and "Ice Fernz" as well as regional teams including the Southern Stampede".
