= New Zealand Ice Hockey Federation =

Ice hockey governing body in New Zealand

New Zealand
- Association name: New Zealand Ice Hockey Federation
- IIHF Code: NZL
- IIHF membership: May 2, 1977
- President: Andy Mills
- IIHF men's ranking: 39th
- IIHF women's ranking: 32nd

The New Zealand Ice Hockey Federation (NZIHF) is the governing body of ice hockey in New Zealand.

== Member Associations ==
- Auckland Ice Hockey Association
- Canterbury Ice Hockey Association
- Southern Ice Hockey League

- Mackenzie Ice Hockey Association
- Queenstown Ice Hockey Association
- Alexandra Flames Ice Hockey Association
- Dunedin Ice Hockey Association
- Gore Grizzlies Ice Hockey Association

Affiliate members

- Wellington Ice Hockey Association

== Competitions ==
The NZIHF organises both the New Zealand National Ice Hockey Championships and the New Zealand Ice Hockey League.

The NZIHF also competes internationally in various grades of the IIHF World Ice Hockey Championship.
