= Dunedin Ice Stadium =

Indoor ice sports and public skate centre in New Zealand

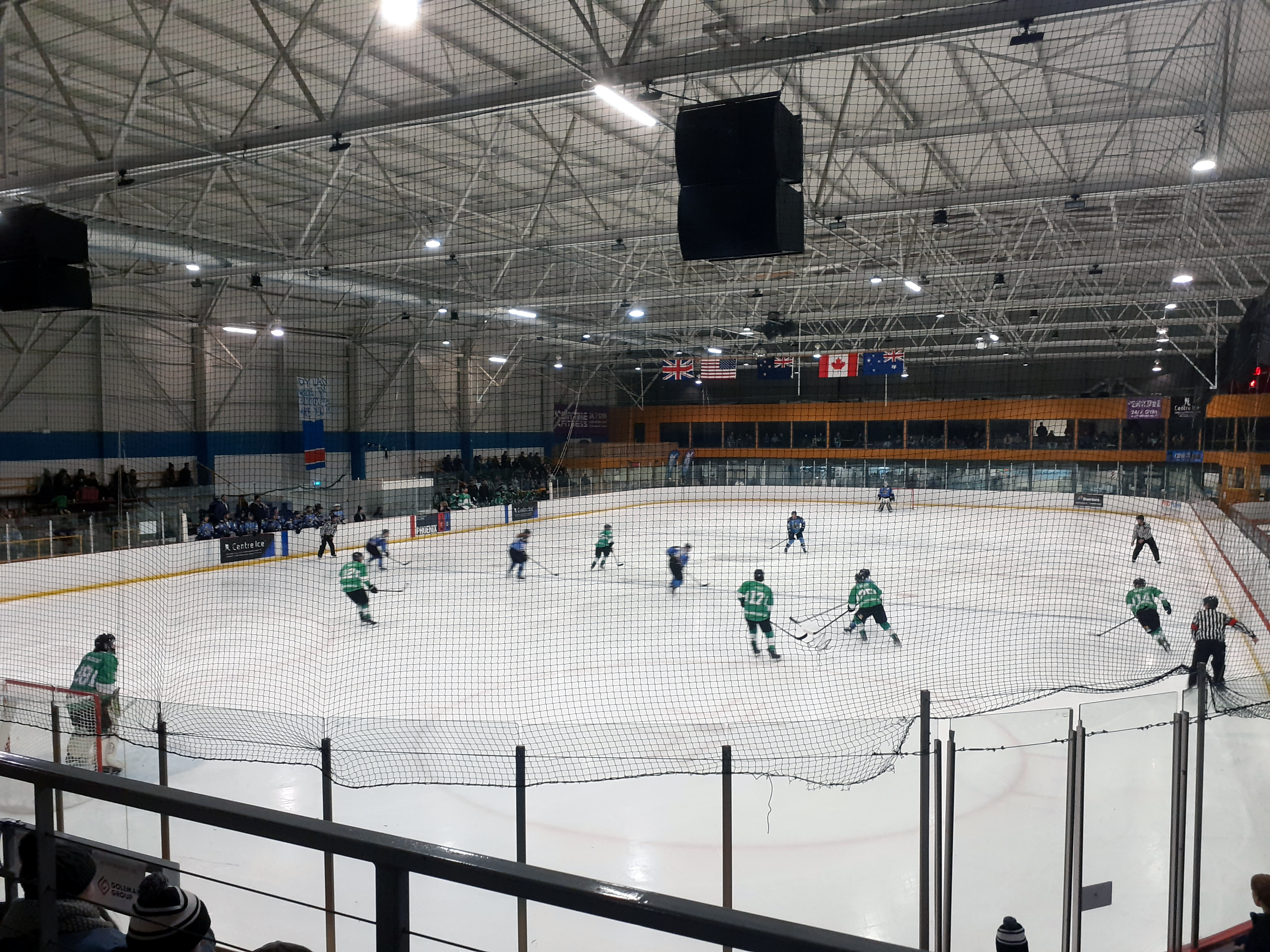
- Dunedin Ice Stadium interior
- Interactive map of Dunedin Ice Stadium
- Location: 101 Victoria Road, Saint Kilda, Dunedin, New Zealand, 9012
- Coordinates: 45.907689°S 170.504733°E
- Owner: Ice Sports Dunedin Inc.
- Capacity: 1,850
- Surface: Ice - 60 m × 30 m (197 ft × 98 ft)
- Public transit: Bus 44 and 55; City to St Kilda

Construction
- Built: 2004
- Opened: October 2004 (21 years ago)
- Renovated: 2006 (4-lane curling rink); 2008-09 (mezzanine level); 2017 (lift to mezzanine level)
- Cost: $4 million

Tenants
- Phoenix Thunder (2008–present); Dunedin Thunder (2020–present)

Website
- dunedinicestadium.co.nz

Dunedin Ice Stadium is an indoor ice sports and public skate centre, that opened in October 2004. It is located in the New Zealand city of Dunedin, in the southern suburb of Saint Kilda. The stadium is owned by Dunedin Ice Sports Inc. and is the current home venue of the Phoenix Thunder in the New Zealand Ice Hockey League (NZIHL) and Dunedin Thunder in the New Zealand Women's Ice Hockey League (NZWIHL). The arena is the only operational indoor ice sports stadium in Dunedin and is the most southern located Olympic sized ice rink in the World.

== History ==
=== Indoor ice facility history of Dunedin ===
First public meeting held in 1975 to gauge public interest in developing and building an indoor ice rink in Dunedin. Meeting was held by Canadian migrant Dr Barrie Berkley and was attended by 30 people. Dunedin's first indoor ice rink opened to the public in 1984 at Kaikorai Valley. The rink was named The Big Chill. It offered very basic amenities and a small ice sheet with square corners. It was missing some amenity that would be regarded as standard in the twenty first centre, things like air conditioning and change rooms. By 1994 the facility is in financial trouble and is bailed out by members of the Dunedin Curling Club purchasing the rink and operational business and transferring ownership to the Curling Club. The rink continues to operate until the board decide in 2000 to halt all new investment in the facility. By 2002, the Big Chill ice rink closes and halts operations.

=== Establishing Dunedin Ice Stadium ===
On 9 December 2002, Dunedin Curling club enters into a new partnership with the Dunedin Ice Hockey Association and Dunedin Ice Skating Club to form a new incorporated society entity named Ice Sports Dunedin (ISD). ISD begins work on planning for a new indoor ice sports facility for the city of Dunedin. In 2003, ISD submits a proposal to the Dunedin City Council to take ownership of the former Dunedin Stadium in St Kilda. Dunedin Stadium's basketball and netball tenants had left the stadium in the mid-1990s when the Edgar Centre opened. Council accepted ISD's proposal and renovation activities commenced. As per the agreement with Council, Council invested $1.2 million and completed a full retrofitting of the stadium's roof with insulated panels. ISD was responsible for all further renovations and fit-out of the facility. ISD began a fundraising campaign, led by Neil Gamble, Edwin Harley and Trevor Lewis, to pay $3.3 million for critical and desired works. ISD completed construction in 2004 thanks to funds raised through community trust grants and issuing of debentures to club members. Two years after the Big Chill had closed, in October 2004, the new Dunedin Ice Stadium opened to the public for the first time. The new indoor ice sports stadium boasted a new Olympic-sized 60m x 30m ice rink. The rink would be named after a pioneer of ice sports in New Zealand and the South Island, Corinne Gilkison.

One year after the opening of the new stadium, adjacent to the Corinne Gilkison ice rink, ISD began construction on a four-lane curling sheet with funding from the Caversham Foundation. Construction took one year to be completed. The Caversham curling rink opened to the public in 2006. In 2008, the New Zealand Ice Hockey League (NZIHL) expanded to include the newly established Dunedin Thunder. The Thunder would base themselves at the Dunedin Ice Stadium with national NZIHL games played and training conducted at the venue. The Ice Stadium also began construction on the next stage of facility expansion with a new $840,000 mezzanine level.

2009 was a big year for Dunedin Ice Stadium. The mezzanine level was completed and would later be named the Gamble Lounge after Neil Gamble. The stadium hosted its first major international tournaments during April and May 2009. First it welcomed five nations, including the New Zealand Ice Blacks for the 2009 IIHF World Championship Division III international ice hockey tournament. Second it welcomed twelve nations for the 2009 World Senior Curling Championships. In August, Dunedin played hosts to international figure skating and ice hockey events at the venue as part of the 2009 New Zealand Winter Games.

Following a successful 2009, ISD gained charitable status in New Zealand. The new status charged the Dunedin Ice Stadium's owners responsibility to the public and community clubs to maintain and improve the Ice Stadium. All funding through admissions and ice time rental would be reinvested in the facility. The Ice Stadium's governance structure was modified in 2013 to include representation from the Dunedin City Council and Sport Otago on top of ISD. The change was completed to solidify the venue's business stability and value to the city of Dunedin. With the establishment of the New Zealand Women's Ice Hockey League (NZWIHL) in 2014, one of the three founding teams, the Southern Storm, would base themselves at Dunedin Ice Stadium, with NZWIHL games played at the venue. In 2017, the Stadium installed a new lift between the ground and mezzanine level to obtain building consent. ISD pays off the last of the stadium's debts to become debt free for the first time. The Storm was disbanded by the NZWIHL in 2020 with two new teams founded in its place. One team based in Queenstown, Wakatipu Wild, and one team based in Dunedin at the Ice Stadium, Dunedin Thunder.

== Facilities ==
The arena's ice sports facilities were built and fitted out in 2004 following the facility's transition from basketball and netball stadium. The Olympic sized ice rink was installed in 2004 with other major facilities gradually updated since then, including the installation of the 4-lane curling rink in 2006 and the mezzanine level between 2008 and 2009. Facilities include:

- 60 m × 30 m ice rink (Olympic sized Corinne Gilkison ice rink)
- 1,850 spectator capacity (including the Alexander McMillan stand, which seats 1,500 people)
- Four-sheet curling rink (Caversham curling rink)
- Skate and equipment hire
- Bumper-cars
- Café
- Bar and lounge (Gamble Lounge)
- Private party room
- Public toilets
- Outdoor parking
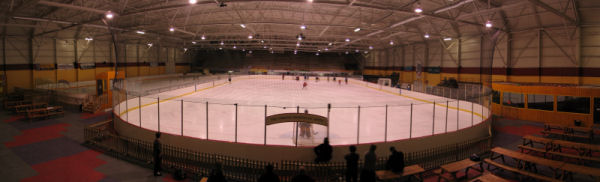
A panorama of the Dunedin Ice Stadium from 2006

== Events ==
Dunedin Ice Stadium hosts regular community, competitive and national events and is utilised by a number of associations and clubs, including Dunedin Ice Hockey Association, Dunedin Ice Skating Club and Dunedin Curling Club. During ice hockey season national men's and women's games are played at Dunedin Ice Stadium in the New Zealand Ice Hockey League and New Zealand Women's Ice Hockey League as the Thunder's women's and men's teams play home games at the venue. In 2009, 2013 and 2017 the stadium hosted the annual New Zealand Women's Curling Championship.

The stadium has been host to international ice hockey and curling tournaments. In April 2009, the venue hosted 2009 IIHF World Championship Division III, which included fifteen scheduled games and involved the New Zealand Ice Blacks. New Zealand won all five games at the venue in the tournament, one in over-time, to finish top of the standings and earn promotion to division II for 2010. Between late April and early May, the stadium hosted the 2009 World Senior Curling Championships. The tournament involved twelve nations, including New Zealand and Australia. New Zealand failed to make it out of their group and the Final saw Canada defeat the United States 4–3.

== See also ==
- List of ice rinks in New Zealand
- Sport in New Zealand
