= Queenstown Gardens =

Botanical garden in New Zealand

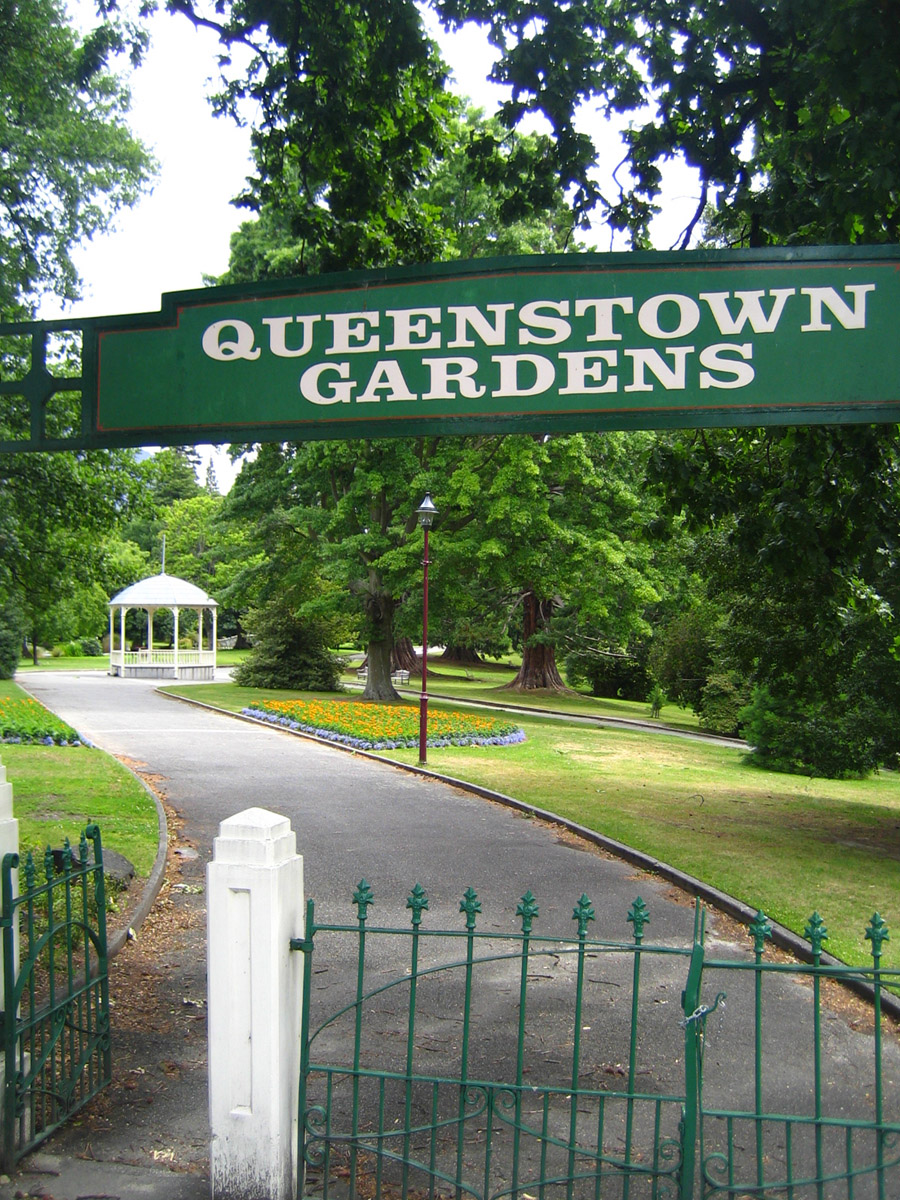
- Entrance to Gardens on Park Street
- Interactive map of Queenstown Gardens
- Type: Botanic gardens
- Location: Queenstown, New Zealand
- Coordinates: 45.037704°S 168.659836°E
- Area: 14.75 hectares (36.4 acres)
- Created: 1867
- Operator: Queenstown Lakes District Council
- Open: All year

The Queenstown Gardens, located next to the town of Queenstown, New Zealand, is a botanical garden which contains a variety of exotic and native trees and plants as well as a large pond and a range of facilities. The facilities in the garden include a children's playground, tennis, lawn bowls, skate boarding, BMX biking, skating, Parkrun, disc golf and ice skating/ice hockey. In winter for about four days it becomes the site of the LUMA Southern Lights Festival.

There is a variety of trails in the garden with views of the surrounding mountains and of Lake Wakatipu and the Frankton Arm as well as Queenstown itself.

The most visible large tree species in the garden is that of the Douglas fir of which there are many large specimens. This tree also forms a protective forest that surrounds much of the gardens. There is also a Rose Garden just past the tennis court.

== History ==
Māori used the Queenstown Gardens peninsula in pre European times: specifically the local tribe of Kāti Māmoe had a settlement here at one stage, but it was no longer there once European explorers arrived.

The first two trees planted at the garden were English oaks in 1866 by the first Mayor of Queenstown, James W. Robertson, and Mr McConnochie, the nurseryman at the time, to commemorate the incorporation of the borough, but it was not until 1867 that the gardens were officially opened and the major planting began. Residents at the time set about planting exotic trees which they planted wherever they chose. By the 1900s the Department of Tourist and Health Resorts was promoting the gardens internationally.

The band rotunda near the Park Street entrance was originally established in 1891 but rebuilt in 1999 by the Queenstown Lions Club.

In the 1960s a formal rose garden was established with 850 rose bushes planted. The Disc Golf Course is the first permanently marked course in New Zealand.

== Heritage trees ==
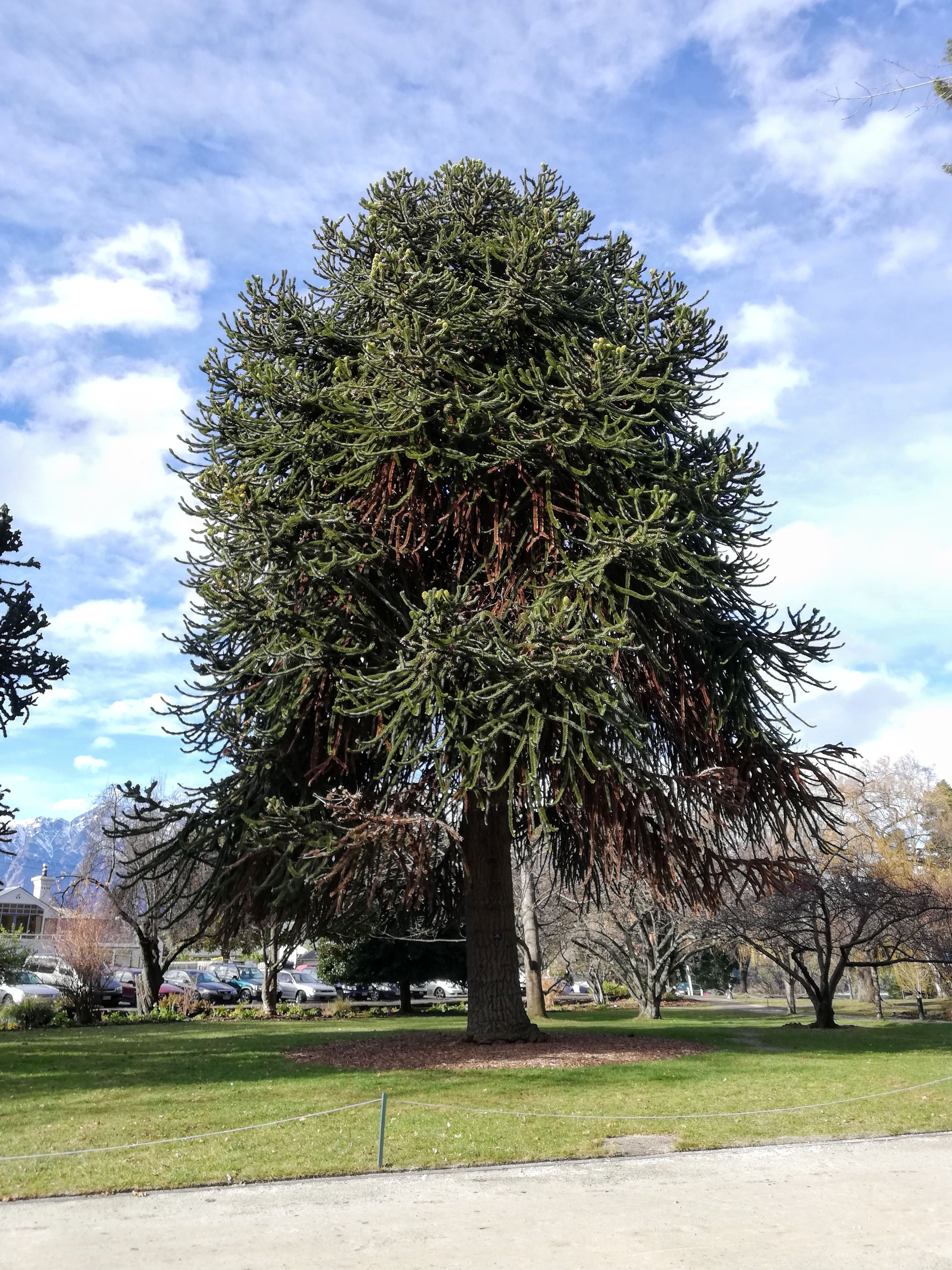
Female Monkey Puzzle Tree

The heritage trees planted by the first mayor of Queenstown, James William Robertson, and protected in the gardens are:

- Black Oak (Quercus velutina)
- Red Oak (Quercus rubra)
- Grand Fir (Abies grandis)
- Algerian Fir (Abies nordmanniana)
- Monkey Puzzle (Araucaria araucana)
- Western Hemlock (Tsuga heterophylla)
- Wellingtonia (Sequoiadendron giganteum)

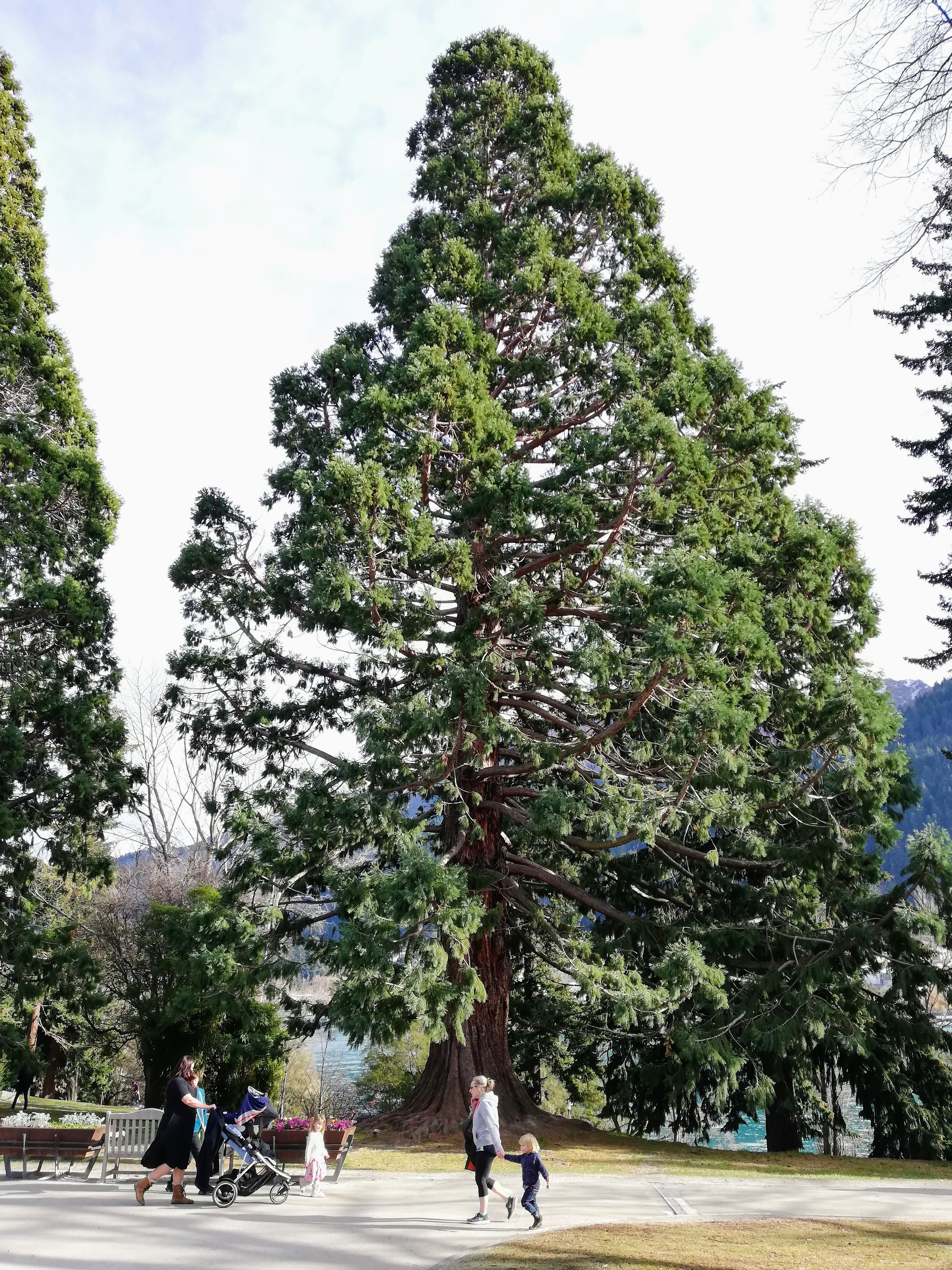
Sequoiadendron giganteum in Queenstown Gardens

== Wildlife ==
There are many different bird species that can be found in or near the gardens. Native species include New Zealand scaup, paradise shelducks, bellbirds, tūī, Australasian crested grebe, black-billed gulls and fantails. Introduced birds species that can be found include sparrows, chaffinches, mallards and blackbirds.

== Memorials ==
There are two significant memorials in the gardens:

- The Scott Memorial unveiled in 1913 is a tribute to Robert Falcon Scott and the men who died during the Antarctic expedition of 1912.
- The Rees Memorial was built in 1978 by the Queenstown and District Historical Society to commemorate the arrival of the areas first settler William Gilbert Rees who arrived in 1860.

== Gallery ==
The pond from the north-eastern end

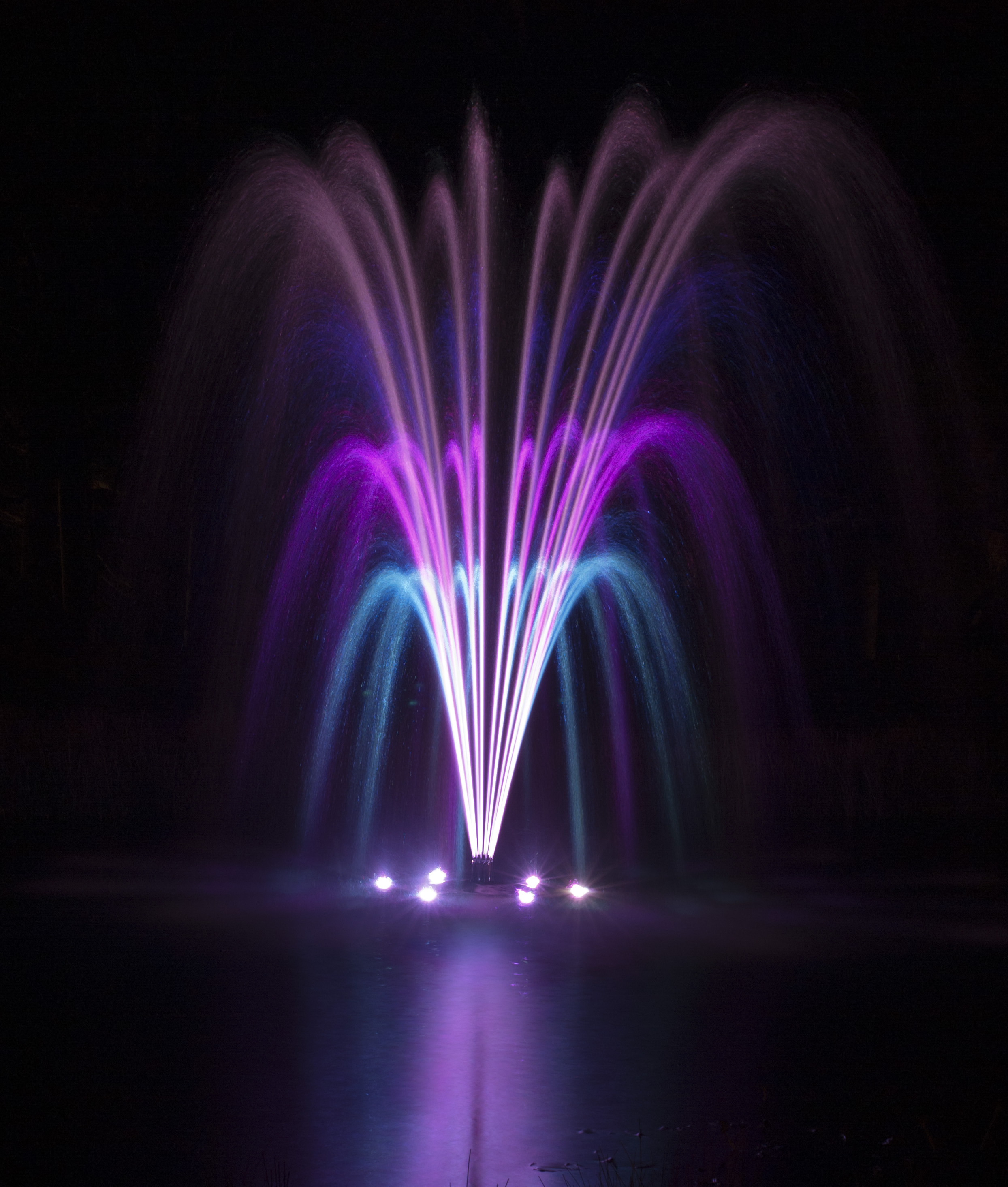
Luma Southern Lights Festival

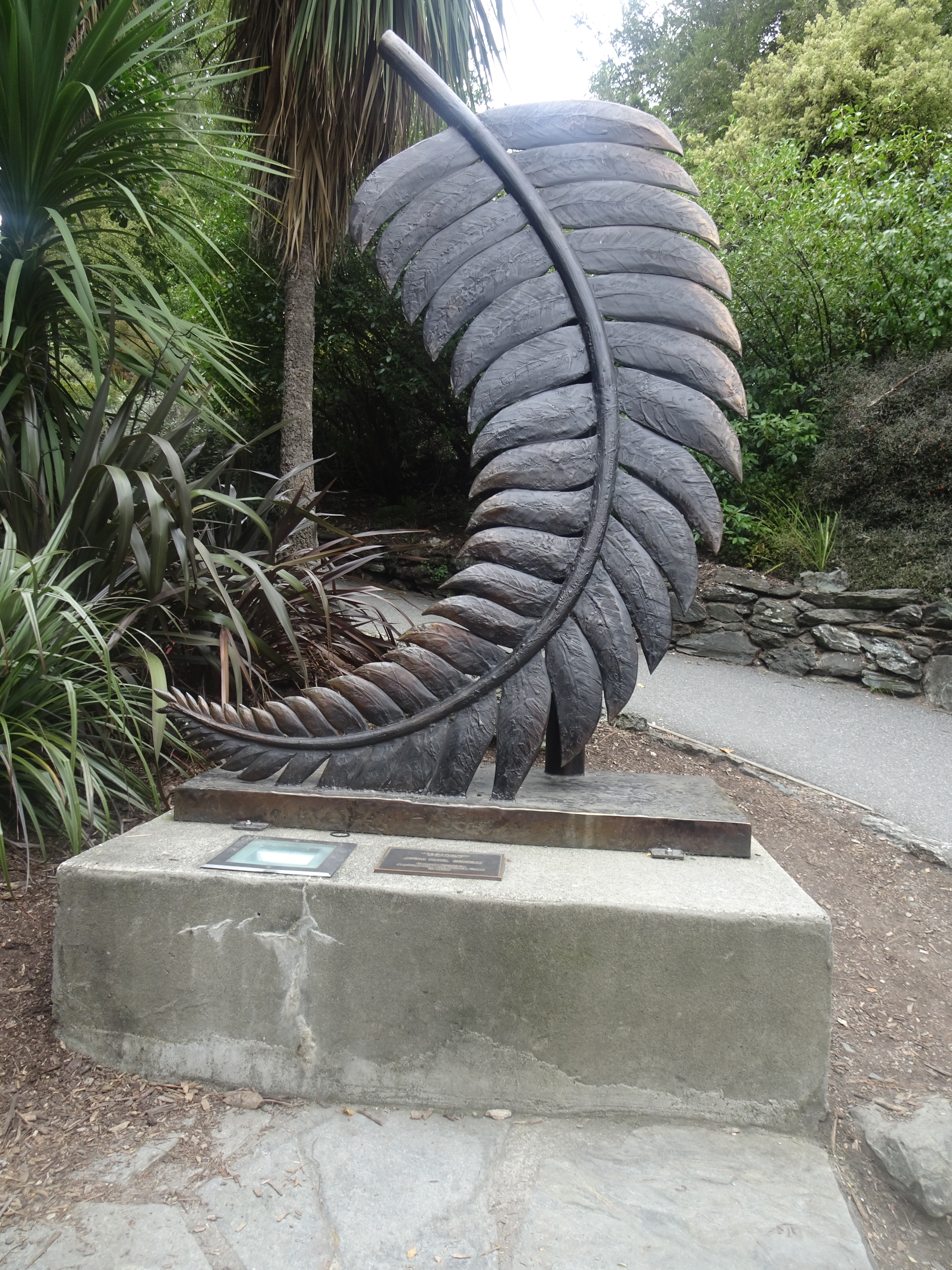
Entrance artwork

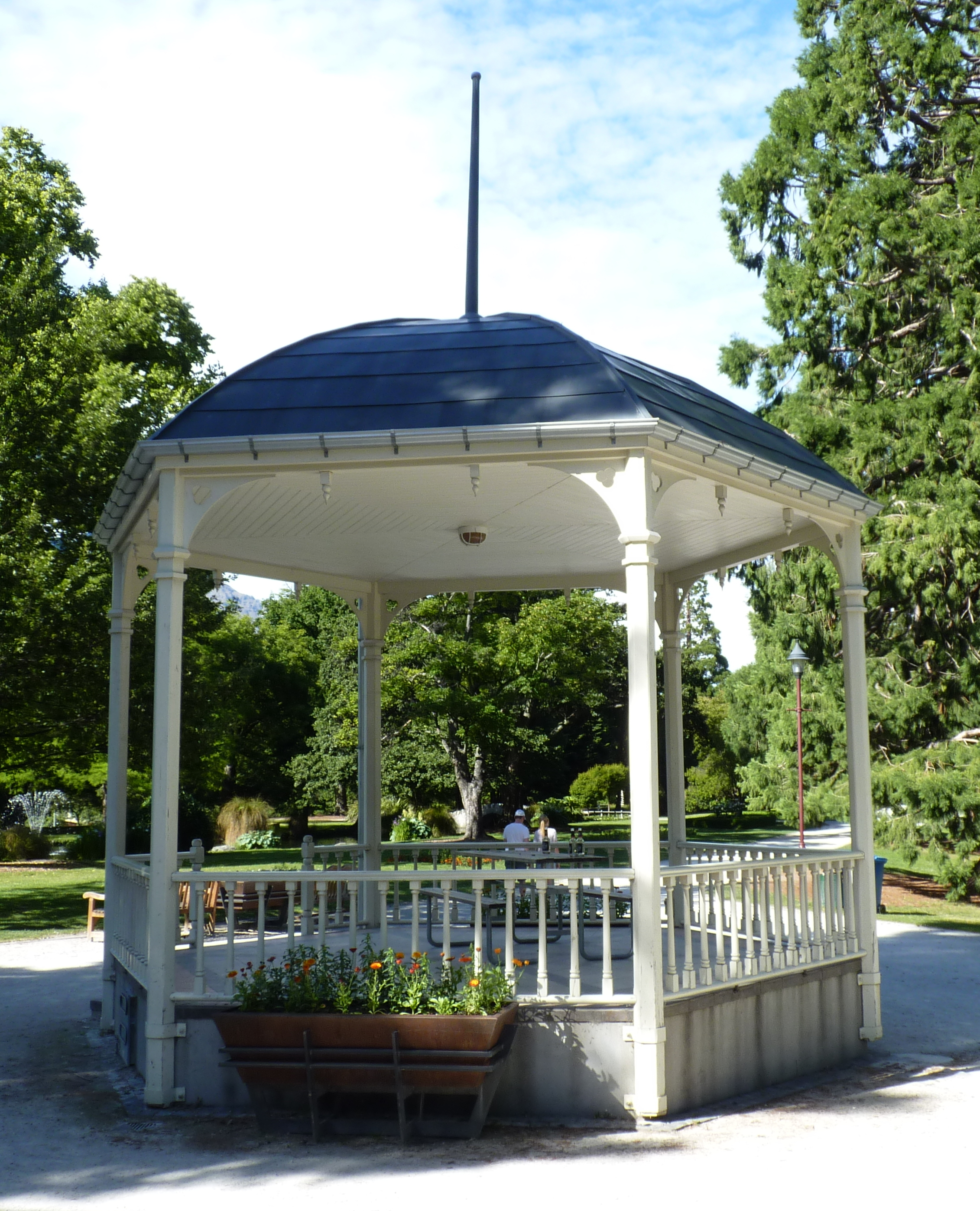
Rotunda

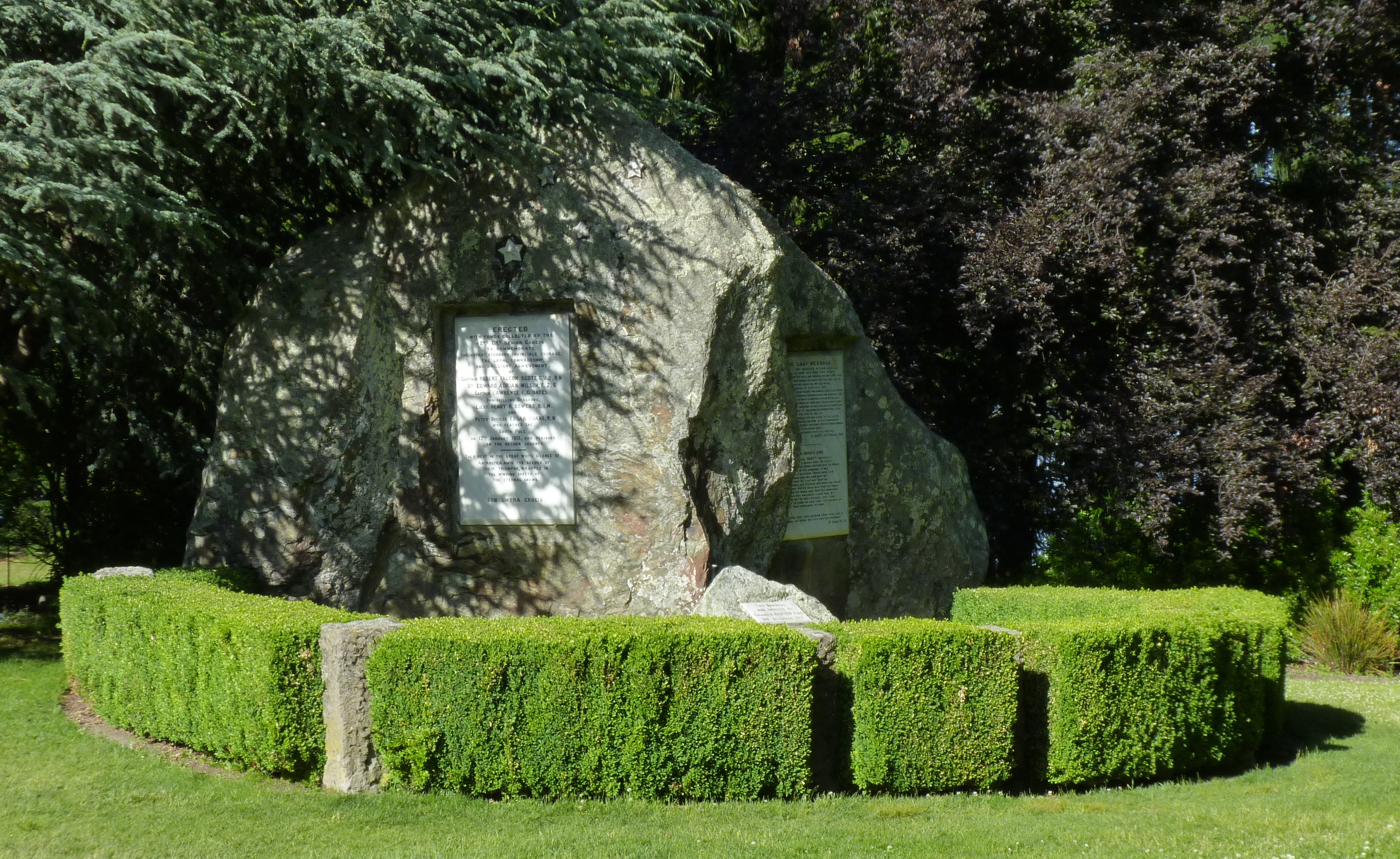
The Scott Memorial

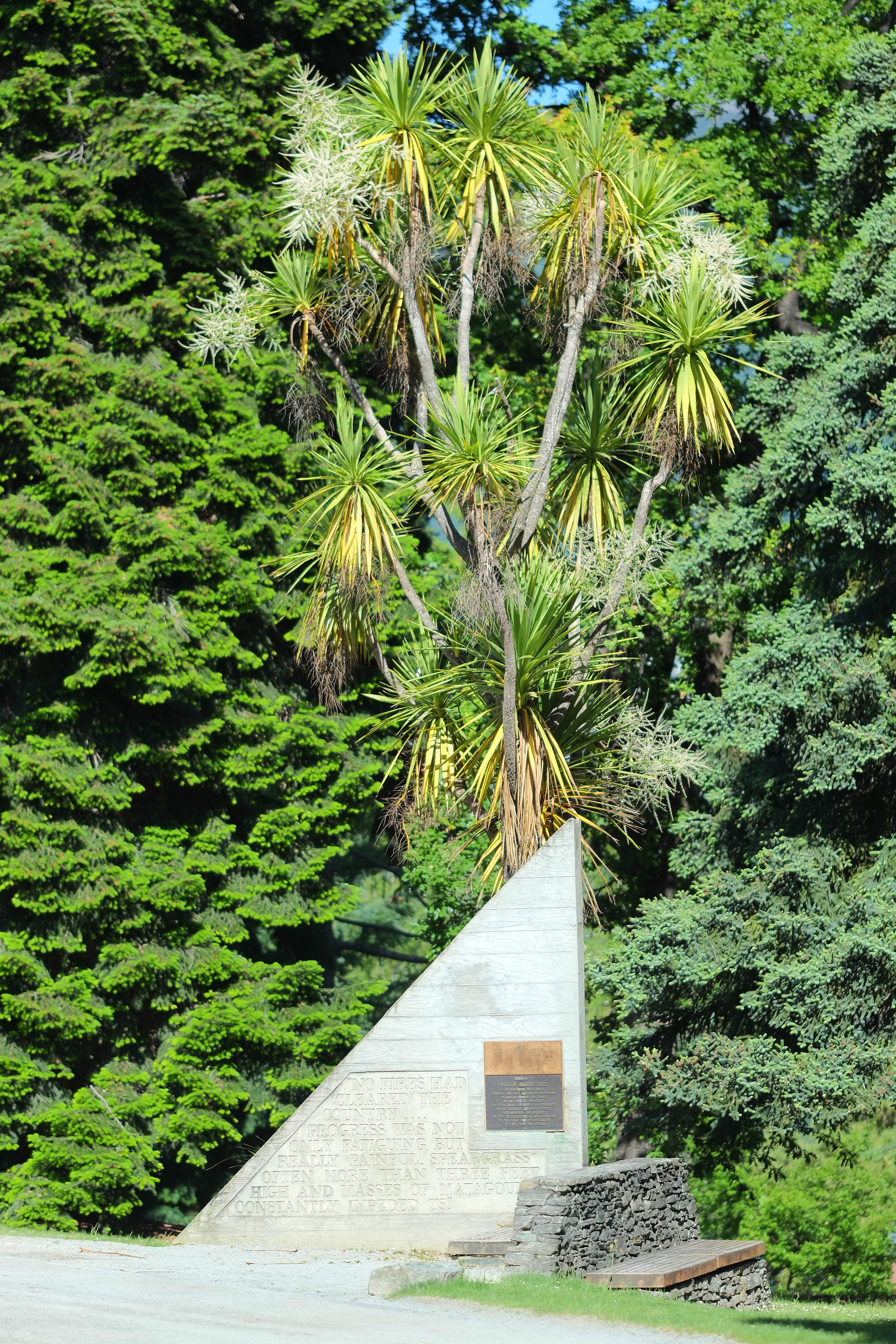
Rees Memorial

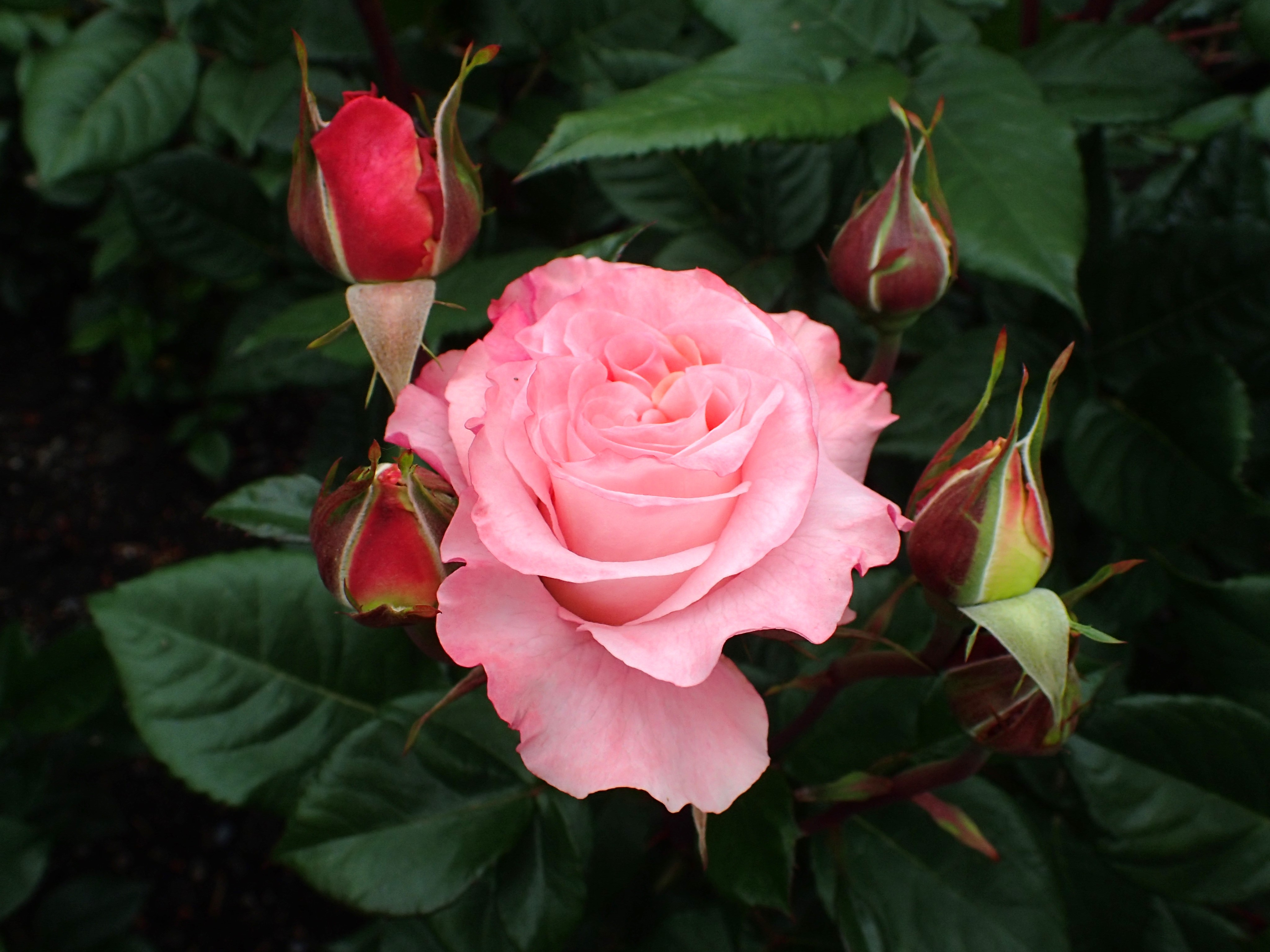
The Rose Gardens

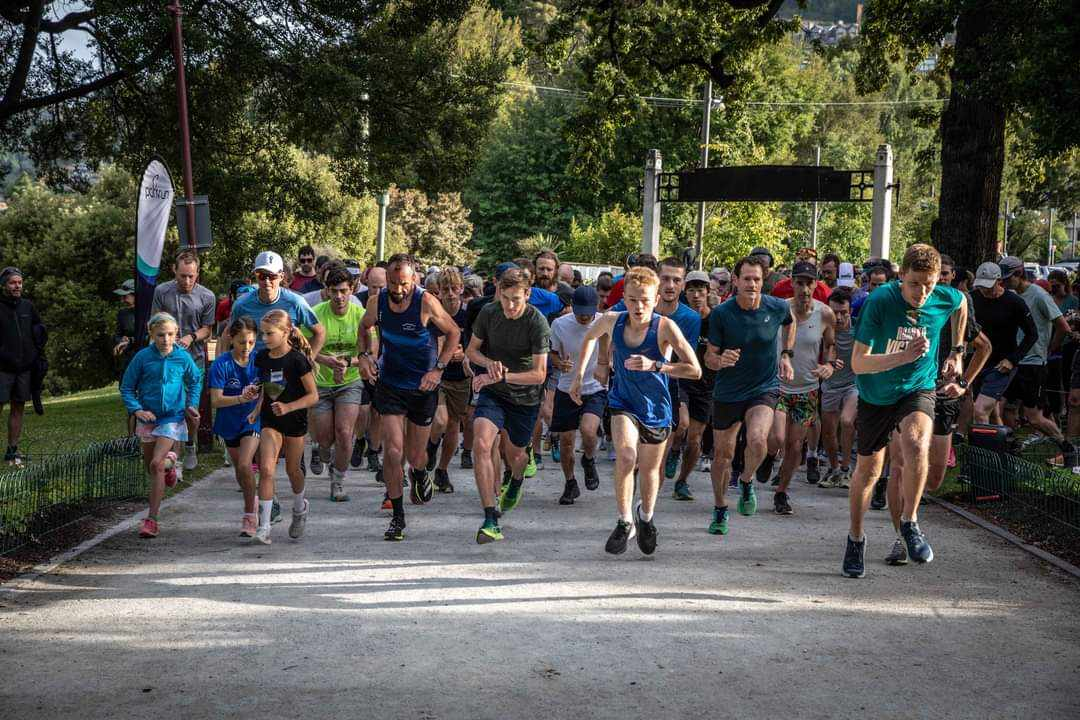
Queenstown Parkrun

== Artworks ==
There is a range of different artworks that can be found in the gardens:

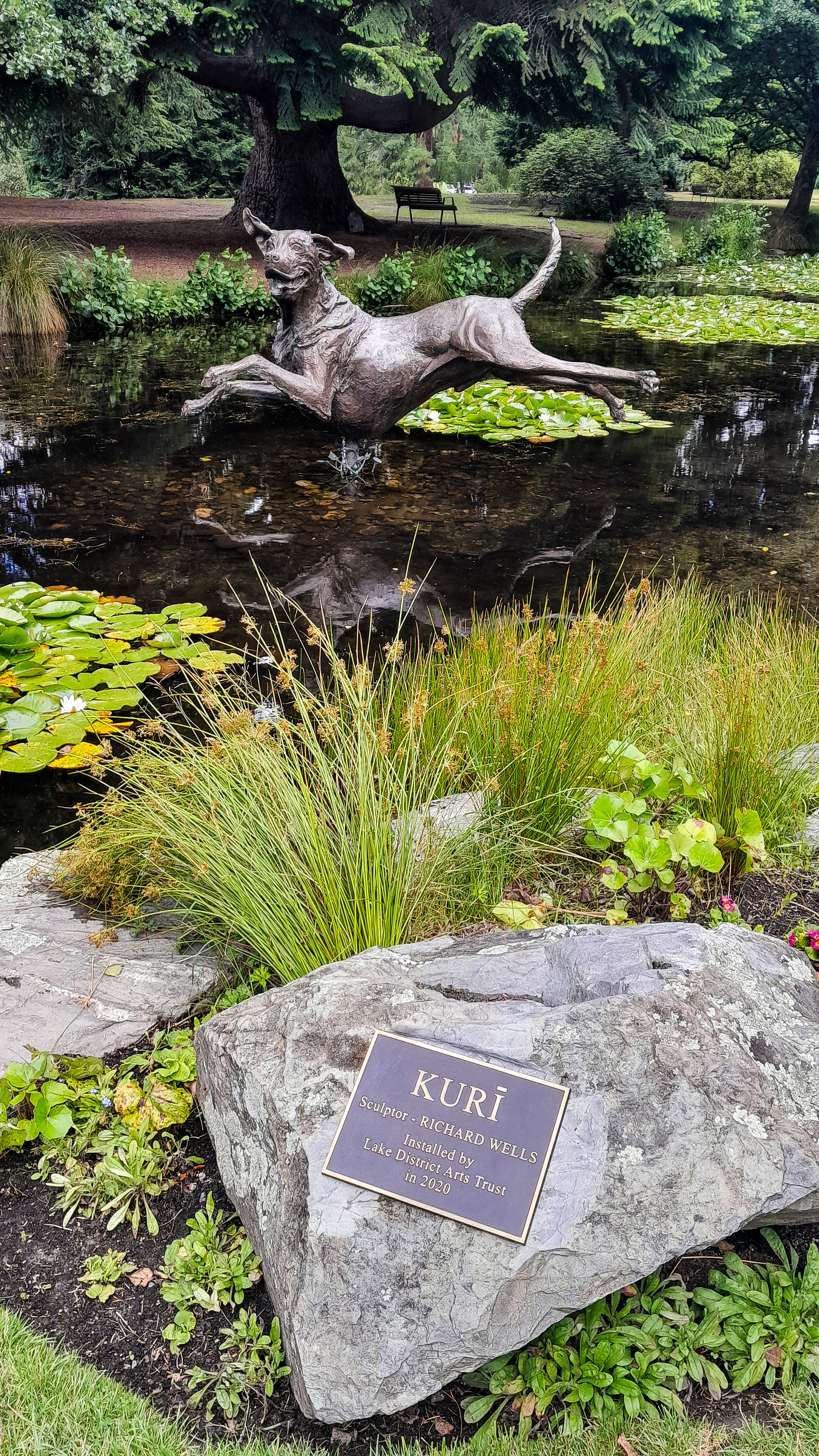
Kurī Sculpture by Richard Wells

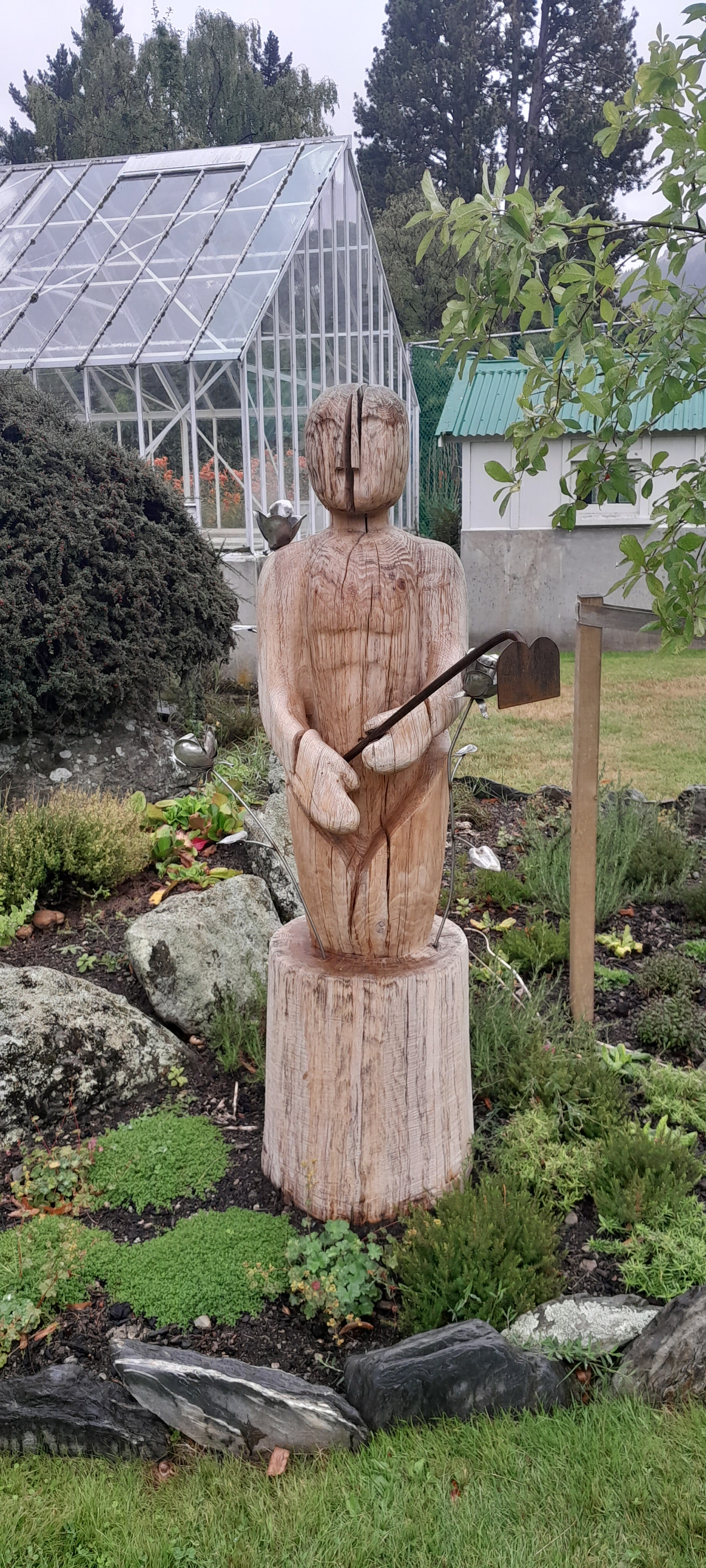
Wooden artwork

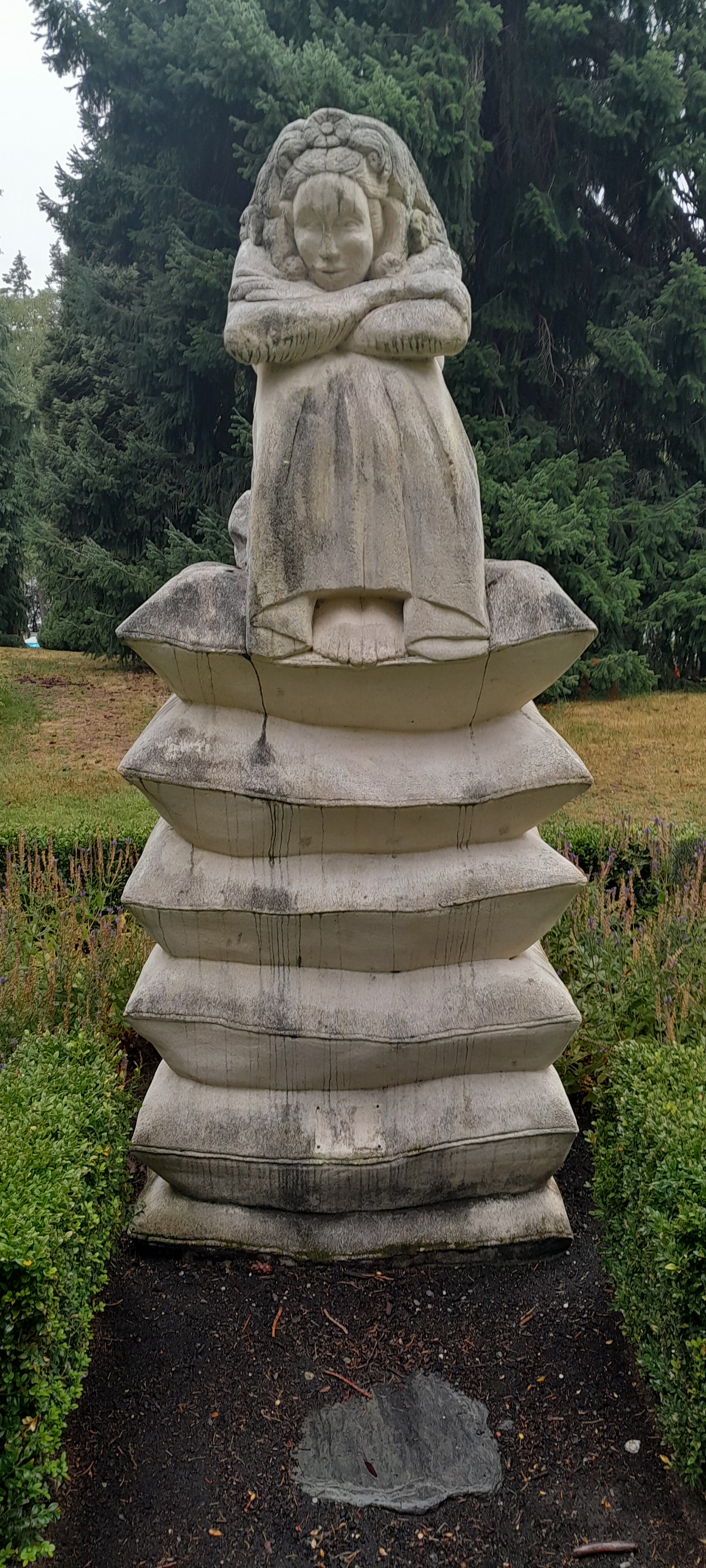
Woman sitting on pillows

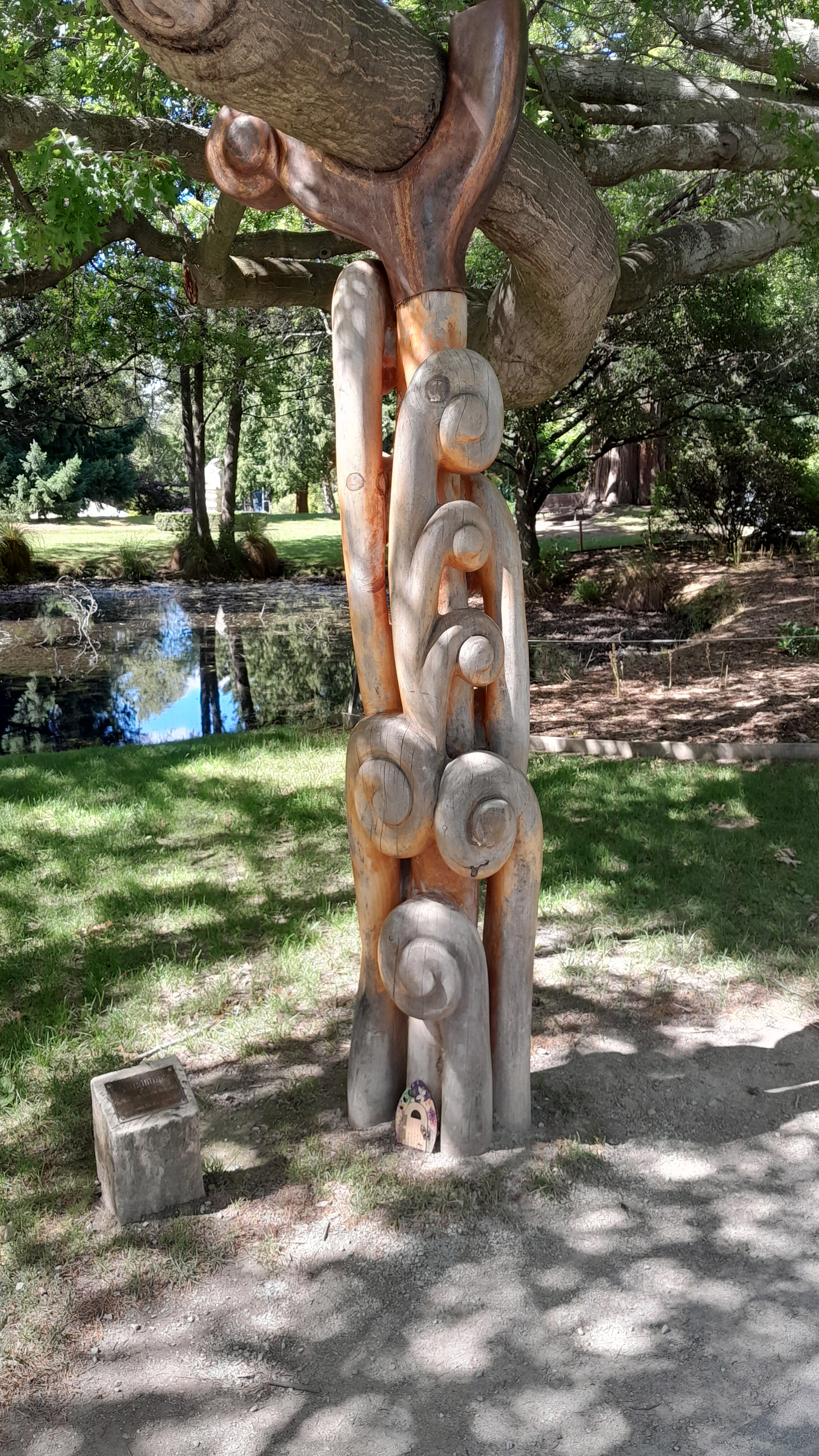
Auxilium by Andrew Rogers
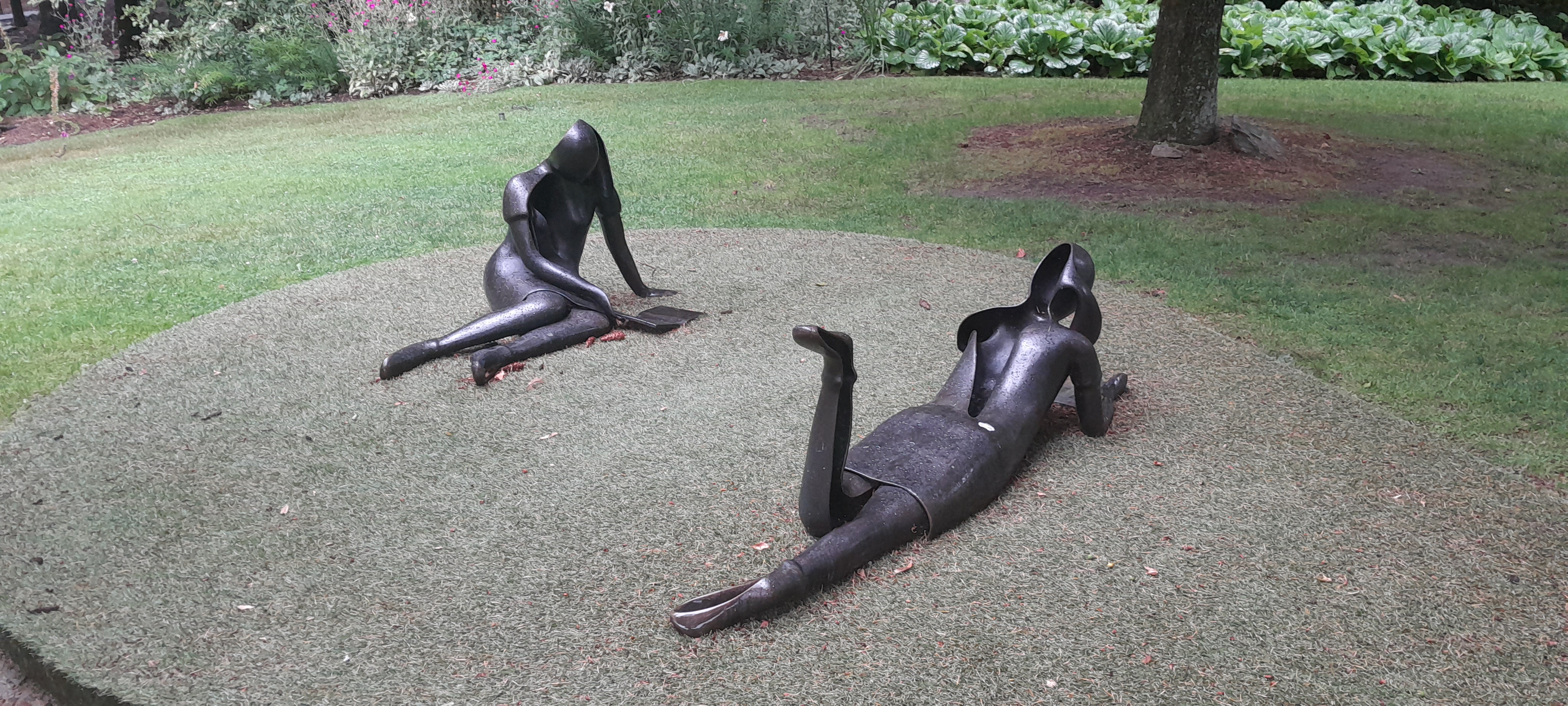
The Good Book sculpture by Trevor Askin
