= 2012 Trans-Tasman Champions League =

Tournament details
- Host country: Australia
- Dates: 7 – 8 July 2012
- Teams: 4

Final positions
- Champions: Melbourne Ice (1st title)

Tournament statistics
- Games played: 4
- Goals scored: 50 (12.5 per game)
- Scoring leader(s): Jeremy Boyer (10 points)

The 2012 Trans-Tasman Champions League was the inaugural tournament between the Australian Ice Hockey League and the New Zealand Ice Hockey League played on July 7 and 8, 2012. It was held at the Medibank Icehouse in Melbourne. Each league fielded their best two teams from the 2011 season, and in a single field game round robin, played against the teams of the other league. The Southern Stampede finished fourth after losing both games and finishing with a minus 18 goal differential, Botany Swarm finished third after losing both games but finishing with a goal differential of minus six, and the Newcastle Northstars finished second after winning both games and finishing with a plus 11 goal differential. The Melbourne Ice finished in first place with a 2–0 record and a +13 goal differential.

== Background ==
The Trans-Tasman Champions League was first announced in August 2011 by the Australian Ice Hockey League and the New Zealand Ice Hockey League. The 2012 Trans-Tasman Champions League was held on 7 and 8 July at the Medibank Icehouse in Melbourne, Victoria, Australia. The tournament consisted of four teams, two from each of the represented leagues. The Australian Ice Hockey League was represented by the Melbourne Ice, the 2011 regular season and Goodall Cup winner, and the Newcastle North Stars, the runner-up of the 2011 Goodall Cup. The New Zealand Ice Hockey League was represented by the Botany Swarm, the 2011 regular season and Birgel Cup winner, and the Southern Stampede, the runner-up of the 2011 Birgel Cup. Teams played two games during the tournament with both games being played against the opposing league teams. Prior to the start of the tournament it was announced that the City of Melbourne had signed as the official sponsors for the tournament. The Melbourne Ice won the tournament after winning both of their games and finishing with the best goal difference in the tournament. Newcastle finished second after winning both of their games against the New Zealand teams but fell short of first place based on goal difference. Both New Zealand teams failed to win either of their games however the Botany Swarm finished ahead of the Southern Stampede with a better goal difference.

== Standings ==
Pos	Team	Pld	W	OTW	OTL	L	GF	GA	GD	Pts
1	Melbourne Ice	2	2	0	0	0	20	7	+13	6
2	Newcastle North Stars	2	2	0	0	0	17	6	+11	6
3	Botany Swarm	2	0	0	0	2	8	14	−6	0
4	Southern Stampede	2	0	0	0	2	5	23	−18	0

== Fixtures ==
All times local.

7 July 2012; 16:00	Southern Stampede	2 – 12 (0–5, 1–3, 1–4)	Melbourne Ice	Medibank Icehouse; Attendance: 720

Game reference

7 July 2012; 19:30	Botany Swarm	3 – 6 (0–1, 2–2, 1–3)	Newcastle North Stars	Medibank Icehouse; Attendance: 280

Game reference

8 July 2012; 16:00	Southern Stampede	3 – 11 (2–3, 1–5, 0–3)	Newcastle North Stars	Medibank Icehouse

Game reference

8 July 2012; 19:30	Botany Swarm	5 – 8 (4–3, 1–2, 0–3)	Melbourne Ice	Medibank Icehouse; Attendance: 750

Game reference

== Scoring leaders ==
List shows the top ten skaters sorted by points, then goals, assists, and the lower penalties in minutes.

Player	Team	GP	G	A	Pts	PIM	POS
(Canada) Jeremy Boyer	Newcastle North Stars	2	4	6	10	0	F
(United States) Brian Bales	Newcastle North Stars	2	3	7	10	2	F
(United States) Doug Wilson	Melbourne Ice	2	1	7	8	6	D
(Canada) Jason Baclig	Melbourne Ice	2	3	4	7	0	F
(Australia) Joseph Hughes	Melbourne Ice	2	3	4	7	8	F
(Canada) Matt Armstrong	Melbourne Ice	2	3	4	7	25	F
(Australia) Beau Taylor	Newcastle North Stars	2	5	1	6	2	F
(Australia) Lliam Webster	Melbourne Ice	2	2	4	6	6	F
(Canada) Robbie Lawrance	Newcastle North Stars	2	0	6	6	2	D
(New Zealand) Charlie Huber	Botany Swarm	2	1	4	5	0	F

== Goaltenders ==
Goaltenders are sorted based on save percentage.

Player	Team	MIP	SOG	GA	GAA	SVS%
(Australia) Olivier Martin	Newcastle North Stars	120	64	6	2.25	0.906
(Australia) Stuart Denman	Melbourne Ice	60	18	2	1.50	0.889
(New Zealand) Zak Nothling	Botany Swarm	120	87	14	5.25	0.839
(Australia) Dahlen Phillips	Melbourne Ice	60	24	5	3.75	0.792
(New Zealand) Aston Brookes	Southern Stampede	120	85	23	8.63	0.729
