= 2025 AIHL season =

- League: Australian Ice Hockey League
- Sport: Ice hockey
- Duration: 5 April 2025 – 31 August 2025

Regular season
- H Newman Reid Trophy: Melbourne Ice (5th title)
- Season MVP: Yu Hikosaka (Thunder)
- Top scorer: Tanner Hopps (80 points) (Lightning)

Goodall Cup
- Champions: Melbourne Ice (5th title)
- Runners-up: Canberra Brave
- Finals MVP: Mackenzie Caruana (Ice)

AIHL seasons
- 2024 2026

The 2025 AIHL season is the 24th season of the Australian Ice Hockey League (AIHL). The season consisted of 117 games, spanning the regular season and Finals (play-offs). The 112 game regular season ran from 5 April to 24 August 2025. The 5 game 2025 Finals series ran from 29 to 31 August 2025 in Melbourne, Australia. The Melbourne Ice won the AIHL premiership and championship double in 2025, claiming the H Newman Reid Trophy and Goodall Cup. The Canberra Brave finished runners-up to both titles and the Central Coast Rhinos claimed the wooden spoon.

== Teams ==
In 2025 the AIHL had 8 teams competing in the league. The Sydney Bears and Sydney Ice Dogs withdrew from competing in the season.

2025 AIHL teams
Team	City	Arena	Head Coach	Captain
Adelaide Adrenaline	(South Australia) Adelaide	Adelaide Ice Arena	(Canada) Jade Galbraith	(Australia) Joey MacDougall
Brisbane Lightning	(Queensland) Brisbane	Boondall Iceworld	(Sweden) Christer Lundkvist	(Australia) Aaron Wanat
Canberra Brave	(Australian Capital Territory) Canberra	AIS Arena	(Australia) Stuart Philps	(Australia) Kai Miettinen
Central Coast Rhinos	(New South Wales) Central Coast	Erina Ice Arena	(Australia) Ron Kuprowsky	(Australia) Robert Malloy
Melbourne Ice	(Victoria (state)) Melbourne	O'Brien Icehouse	(Canada) Kerry Goulet	(Australia) Mackenzie Caruana
Melbourne Mustangs	(Victoria (state)) Melbourne	O'Brien Icehouse	(Canada) Scott Timmins	(Australia) Todd Cutter
Newcastle Northstars	(New South Wales) Newcastle	Hunter Ice Skating Stadium	(Canada) Kevin Noble	(Australia) Liam Manwarring
Perth Thunder	(Western Australia) Perth	Perth Ice Arena	(Australia) Benjamin Breault	(Australia) Jamie Woodman

== League Business ==
For Season 2025, the AIHL first released the fixture list in November 2024. All ten teams from 2024 would be returning for a 150-game regular season running from 5 April to 24 August 2025. As part of a regular season revamp, the league introduced two all-team mid-season byes for Easter long weekend in late April and IIHF World Championships in early May. The conference system used between 2023 and 2024 was abolished and more Friday night games were scheduled, including first Friday night games for Adelaide Adrenaline and Perth Thunder. The Goodall Cup, H Newman Reid Trophy would continue to the be prizes AIHL teams would compete for in 2025. However, the Rurak and Hellyer conference trophies would be retired.

The AIHL were forced into mandatory season plan changes in late December 2024. Macquarie Ice Rink in Sydney was closed for required repairs and rink upgrades that would keep the facility closed for the majority of 2025. Upgrades include new plant room infrastructure, new humidifiers across the arena, new boards, installation of plexiglass around the rink and new player benches and penalty boxes. The Sydney Bears and Sydney Ice Dogs were both affected by the closure and sought alternative option to continue to operate in 2025. Both teams failed to find suitable alternative options and formally withdrew from the 2025 AIHL season.

With the Ice Dogs and Bears out, the AIHL released a new 8-team season schedule, reducing the number of games from 150 to 112. Both all-team byes remained but the additional Friday night games were scrapped. All teams would play a total 28 games, down from 30, split between 14 home and 14 away fixtures.

Between December 2024 and January 2025, the league announced a number of personnel and governance changes including appointing Ron Gauci to the AIHL board of directors. Gauci joins Garry Dore, Peter Jon Hartshorne, Wayne Hellyer, John Hollingsworth, Joyce Price, Ivan Rapchuk, and Bob Turner on the board as the eighth member. Gauci is the current chairman of Vicsport and former CEO and managing director of the Melbourne Storm. Jo-Ann Flood was appointed AIHL Sports Integrity Officer to replace the departed Lesley Crombie. As the Head of Sport Integrity, Jo-Ann is responsible for ensuring compliant regulation of all league activities, including games and operations as well as leading efforts to promote fair play, prevent misconduct, and build trust amongst teams. Mark O'Brien was appointed new Head of Player Safety for the AIHL. Mark has vast experience officiating at all levels of ice hockey in Australia and joins the AIHL after being referee-in-chief for Ice Hockey Queensland for the past six years. Ben Armstrong resigned as AIHL operations manager. Ben held the position for 2 years, having been appointed in 2023. Armstrong took up an opportunity as gameday operations manager with the Newcastle Northstars.

In March 2025, the AIHL released a special anniversary logo for the 2025 season. The new logo recognised the 25th year since the league founding in 2000. Media partnerships were signed between the AIHL and Oz Hockey Media (Formally Hockey Hype Australia) and 6News Australia in April 2025. It is the second year of partnership between the league and Oz Hockey Media and a new partnership with 6News.

=== Exhibition games ===
Three pre-season exhibition games were organised by AIHL teams in 2025. The Melbourne derby doubled as a Good Friday Appeal charity match, raising money for the Royal Children's Hospital. The exhibition game raised one of the largest charitable donations by the Australian ice hockey community, totaling $32,502. To help the Australian men's national team prepare for the IIHF World Championships division 2A tournament, an exhibition game was organised between the national team and an AIHL All-Stars team consisting of Mustangs and Ice players.

2025 AIHL exhibition games
Date	Time	Away	Score	Home	Location	Recap
22 March 2025	17:00	Central Coast Rhinos	6–8	Newcastle Northstars	Hunter Ice Skating Stadium	Ref
28 March 2025	19:30	Melbourne Mustangs	3–5	Melbourne Ice	O’Brien Icehouse	Ref
29 March 2025	15:15	Newcastle Northstars	1–2	Central Coast Rhinos	Erina Ice Arena	Ref
22 April 2025	20:15	Australia	8–2	AIHL All-Stars	O’Brien Icehouse	Ref

=== Team changes ===
The Canberra Brave will change home venues for the first time in the team's history, switching Phillip Ice Skating Centre for the AIS Arena. The first three home games in 2025 will continue to be played at Phillip but the remaining 11 will be played in a temporary state-of-the-art rink constructed in the 2,700 seat (ice hockey seating configuration) AIS Arena. The AIS will offer the first full bowl seating experience in the AIHL, bringing a North American or European style experience to Australian ice hockey for the first time.

Adelaide Adrenaline released a new team logo. The traditional 'A' logo is replaced with a yeti holding a hockey stick. This invokes the short lived former Adelaide Avalanche yeti logo from 2008 to 2009, before the Avalanche organisation collapsed and folded. Last season, in 2024, the Adrenaline played in a one-off throwback jersey with the old yeti logo. As part of the rebrand, the Adrenaline have also amended their team colours to blue and gold, removing red. Adelaide also made fan experience improvements to the Adelaide Ice Arena by raising two sections around the rink to enable better viewing angles. A new standing zone was established behind the goals and a new VIP section was created in one of the rink corners.

Brisbane Lightning released new altered versions of their main and alternative logo for 2025. The main logo is simplified while the alternative 'BL' logo has been given additional stylised lightning elements. Melbourne Mustangs released a new special anniversary logo and jersey to celebrate the team's 15th year of operations. It features a modified version of the team's regular logo and an updated layout of the orange-and-black colour scheme.

=== Personnel changes ===
Ahead of the season, On 22 October 2024, Terry Kilwnik stepped down as head coach of the Brisbane Lightning. On 9 December 2024, it was announced Swedish coach Christer Lundkvist would take the rains as head coach of the Lightning for the 2025 AIHL season. With the head coaching position vacant at the Adelaide Adrenaline, the team announced a new head coach on 19 March 2025. Canadian Jade Galbraith was appointed for his first senior head coaching role of his career.

=== Player transfers ===
Below are lists of players entering, exiting, transferring and retiring from the AIHL in 2025.

==== Interclub transfers ====
Nat	Player	Previous team	New team
(Australia)	Harley Anderson	Brisbane Lightning	Adelaide Adrenaline
(Australia)	Ryan Annesley	Sydney Bears	Newcastle Northstars
(Australia)	Tyerell Clare	Sydney Bears	Melbourne Mustangs
(Australia)	Scott Clemie	Sydney Bears	Canberra Brave
(Australia)	Braden Costa	Sydney Ice Dogs	Brisbane Lightning
(Australia)	Kale Costa	Sydney Ice Dogs	Canberra Brave
(Australia)	Bray Crowder	Sydney Ice Dogs	Canberra Brave
(Australia)	Cooper Davidson-Peacock	Perth Thunder	Central Coast Rhinos
(Australia)	Jakob Doornbos	Sydney Ice Dogs	Brisbane Lightning
(Australia)	Glen Forbes-White	Central Coast Rhinos	Canberra Brave
(Australia)	Brian Funes	Sydney Bears	Newcastle Northstars
(Australia)	Arki Hearn	Central Coast Rhinos	Newcastle Northstars
(Australia)	Mackenzie Hill	Melbourne Mustangs	Melbourne Ice
(Australia)	Marcus Hosen	Sydney Ice Dogs	Brisbane Lightning
(Australia)	Anthony Kimlin	Sydney Bears	Melbourne Mustangs
(Australia)	Casey Kubara	Canberra Brave	Newcastle Northstars
(Australia)	Tyler Kubara	Canberra Brave	Central Coast Rhinos
(Australia)	Dmitri Kuleshov	Sydney Ice Dogs	Central Coast Rhinos
(Australia)	Ivan Kuleshov	Sydney Ice Dogs	Central Coast Rhinos
(Australia)	Tomas Landa	Sydney Bears	Central Coast Rhinos
(Australia)	Brody Lindal	Sydney Bears	Melbourne Mustangs
(Australia)	Michael McMahon	Melbourne Mustangs	Melbourne Ice
(Canada)	Carson Miller	Sydney Bears	Brisbane Lightning
(Australia)	Matt Musumeci	Sydney Ice Dogs	Central Coast Rhinos
(Australia)	Nicholas Novysedlak	Brisbane Lightning	Adelaide Adrenaline
(Australia)	Tyrone Oxlade	Sydney Bears	Newcastle Northstars
(Australia)	Samuel Poole	Sydney Bears	Adelaide Adrenaline
(Australia)	Gabriel Robledo	Sydney Bears	Central Coast Rhinos
(Sweden)	Jonatan Ruth	Canberra Brave	Central Coast Rhinos
(Australia)	Cameron Todd	Sydney Ice Dogs	Canberra Brave
(Australia)	Aleksi Toivonen	Canberra Brave	Perth Thunder
(Australia)	Matus Trnka	Adelaide Adrenaline	Brisbane Lightning

* Mid-season transfer.

==== Retirements ====
Nat	Player	Team	New role
(Australia)	Nicholas Novysedlak	Brisbane Lightning	No team

==== New signings ====
Nat	Player	Previous team	New team
(Denmark)	Sebastian Bergholt	Rødovre Mighty Bulls	Melbourne Ice
(United States)	David Booth	Ferencvárosi Torna Club	Melbourne Ice
(Australia)	Logan Brodie	Gilmour Academy	Central Coast Rhinos
(Australia)	Declan Bronte	Fitchburg Falcons	Melbourne Ice
(Australia)	Tyrone Bronte	KHL Sisak	Melbourne Ice
(Canada)	Alex Campbell	Guelph Gryphons	Brisbane Lightning
(Australia)	Hugh Campbell	Southern Drop Bears	Brisbane Lightning
(New Zealand)	Dominic Canic	KHL Sisak	Canberra Brave
(Sweden)	Nils Carnbäck	Pionniers de Chamonix Mont-Blanc	Canberra Brave
(Hong Kong)	Horrance Cheung	HKIHA Yellow	Newcastle Northstars
(Australia)	Gregory Chystyakov	Polyflor Raptors	Central Coast Rhinos
(New Zealand)	Liam Dallimore	Canterbury Red Devils	Melbourne Mustangs
(Australia)	Corey Dang	Melbourne Jets	Central Coast Rhinos
(Canada)	Cale Dolan	Simon Fraser Red Leafs	Adelaide Adrenaline
(Australia)	Jarrod Downes	Bison IHC	Melbourne Mustangs
(Australia)	Declan Downie	Norwest Emperors	Central Coast Rhinos
(Canada)	Nathan Dunkley	Kansas City Mavericks	Melbourne Mustangs
(Australia)	Ethan Elford	Norwest Emperors U17	Canberra Brave
(Australia)	Darcy Flanagan	Eskilstuna Linden Hockey 2	Adelaide Adrenaline
(Canada)	Jade Galbraith	Cremona Coyotes	Adelaide Adrenaline
(Australia)	Devon Gatenby	No team	Newcastle Northstars
(Canada)	Alexandre Gauthier	No team	Central Coast Rhinos
(United States)	Jake Hamilton	Pensacola Ice Flyers	Perth Thunder
(Australia)	Thomas Harrow	Victus Academy U18	Canberra Brave
(Australia)	Noah Harvey	Canberra Jokerit	Canberra Brave
(New Zealand)	Joel Hasselman	Skycity Stampede	Canberra Brave
(United States)	Nico Hemming	EC Eisbären Balingen	Brisbane Lightning
(Canada)	Tanner Hopps	Macon Mayhem	Brisbane Lightning
(Australia)	Vinnie Hughes	No team	Melbourne Ice
(Australia)	Mitchell Humphries	No team	Melbourne Mustangs
(Australia)	Lucas Hunter	IceHQ Ducks	Melbourne Mustangs
(Australia)	Mitchell Jackson-Leghorn	Newcastle NorthRays	Central Coast Rhinos
(Jamaica)	Kolby Johnson	Worcester Railers	Perth Thunder
(South Korea)	Hwan Hee Kang	HC Dukla Senica	Canberra Brave
(Thailand)	Benjamin Kleineschay	Aware	Newcastle Northstars
(Australia)	Henri Kohvakka	IPK U20	Melbourne Ice
(Czech Republic)	Karel Kubát	HK 36 Skalica	Newcastle Northstars
(United Kingdom)	Robert Lachowicz	Glasgow Clan	Perth Thunder
(Australia)	Luka Loria	EHC Straubing	Adelaide Adrenaline
(Australia)	Matthew Last	Shawnigan Lake School U18 Prep	Central Coast Rhinos
(Canada)	Trevor Lord	Watertown Wolves	Melbourne Mustangs
(Australia)	Taj Lowrey	Kingston Wranglers	Newcastle Northstars
(Australia)	Maxim Lyashenko	West Coast Flyers	Perth Thunder
(Australia)	Kyle MacPhail	KHL Sisak	Adelaide Adrenaline
(Australia)	Alex May	Melbourne Sharks	Brisbane Lightning
(Italy)	Brandon McNally	Tohoku Free Blades	Canberra Brave
(Canada)	Brandon Mendham	No team	Central Coast Rhinos
(Canada)	Ryan Migliaccio	No team	Central Coast Rhinos
(China)	Yuexi Mu	Shenzhen KRS	Central Coast Rhinos
(Australia)	Ruben Nalos	New Jersey 87's	Central Coast Rhinos
(Latvia)	Romāns Ņekļudovs	Bisons de Neuilly-sur-Marne	Adelaide Adrenaline
(Australia)	Patrick O’Kane	No team	Melbourne Mustangs
(Australia)	Nikolas Panayi	Åmåls SK J20	Central Coast Rhinos
(Australia)	Thomas Papas	Tottenham Railers	Melbourne Mustangs
(New Zealand)	Connor Parr	Botany Swarm	Adelaide Adrenaline
(Australia)	Ozzy Partridge	Southern Drop Bears	Brisbane Lightning
(Australia)	Dylan Penhall	Newcastle North Stars (ECSL)	Newcastle Northstars
(Canada)	Zack Phillips	Manchester Storm	Melbourne Mustangs
(Australia)	Jett Porter	BioSteel Sports Academy	Melbourne Mustangs
(Australia)	Thomas Powell	Blackhawks IHC	Melbourne Ice
(Canada)	Coy Prevost	Monroe Moccasins	Adelaide Adrenaline
(Australia)	David Quinn	Sydney Heat	Central Coast Rhinos
(Australia)	Alexei Rayzman	Monarchs IHC	Melbourne Ice
(United States)	Caelan Rea	Roanoke Maroons	Adelaide Adrenaline
(Australia)	Gustav Remler-Jensen	Atlantic Coast Academy	Central Coast Rhinos
(Germany)	Alex Roach	Glasgow Clan	Perth Thunder
(Canada)	Mac Roy	Powell River Regals	Melbourne Mustangs
(Australia)	Liam Ryan	MacEwan Griffins	Newcastle Northstars
(Australia)	Ryan Senti	Hershey Cubs	Canberra Brave
(Canada)	Kolton Shindle	Regina Cougars	Melbourne Ice
(Australia)	Billy Simmonds	IceHQ Ducks	Melbourne Mustangs
(Romania)	Yevgeni Skachkov	Corona Brasov	Newcastle Northstars
(Australia)	Jackson Staneke	Southern Drop Bears	Brisbane Lightning
(Australia)	Corey Stringer	No team	Melbourne Ice
(Switzerland)	Jules Sturny	EHC Basel	Brisbane Lightning
(Sweden)	Kim Tallberg	Coventry Blaze	Newcastle Northstars
(Australia)	Riley Tonks	Kallhälls IF	Newcastle Northstars
(Australia)	Dominik Trnka	HC Letci Letnany	Adelaide Adrenaline
(Finland)	Jesperi Viikilä	ECB Zagłębie Sosnowiec	Canberra Brave
(New Zealand)	Robin Vortanov	Botany Swarm	Melbourne Mustangs
(Australia)	Arthur Wang	Johns Hopkins Blue Jays	Newcastle Northstars
(Australia)	Jordan Warren	Melbourne Jets	Melbourne Mustangs
(China)	Justin Wen	Toledo Cherokee	Central Coast Rhinos

==== Players lost ====
Nat	Player	Previous team	New team
(Canada)	Jeremiah Addison	Perth Thunder	No team
(Australia)	Derry Adler	Brisbane Lightning	No team
(Canada)	Chance Adrian	Brisbane Lightning	Tilburg Trappers
(United States)	Austin Albrecht	Melbourne Ice	Tulsa Oilers
(Australia)	Harley Anderson	Brisbane Lightning	Brisbane Moose
(Canada)	John Aonso	Melbourne Ice	Peoria Rivermen
(Australia)	Matt Armstrong	Melbourne Mustangs	No team
(Australia)	Oliver Ashby	Melbourne Mustangs	St. John's Red Storm
(Germany)	Maximilian Astner	Canberra Brave	No team
(Australia)	Matheus Baldwin	Melbourne Mustangs	No team
(Canada)	Connor Bartholomew	Sydney Ice Dogs	Sydney Bombers
(Canada)	Daniel Berno	Newcastle Northstars	No team
(France)	Léo Bertein	Perth Thunder	Corsaires de Dunkerque
(Australia)	Connor Bolger	Central Coast Rhinos	No team
(Mexico)	Estefano Bonfante	Central Coast Rhinos	Sydney Bombers
(United States)	Matthew Brown	Central Coast Rhinos	No team
(Canada)	Tanner Butler	Newcastle Northstars	Bristol Pitbulls
(Australia)	Jamie Campbell	Perth Thunder	No team
(United States)	Austin Cangelosi	Canberra Brave	Storhamar Hockey
(New Zealand)	Andrew Cox	Perth Thunder	No team
(Netherlands)	Mike Dalhuisen	Sydney Ice Dogs	Tilburg Trappers
(Australia)	Greg Davis	Melbourne Ice	No team
(Canada)	Mathieu Desautels	Newcastle Northstars	Albatros de Brest
(Australia)	Justin Dixon	Melbourne Mustangs	Blackhawks IHC
(Canada)	Kesho Donald	Sydney Ice Dogs	Reach Rebels
(Australia)	James Douchkov	Sydney Ice Dogs	Sydney Bombers
(Canada)	Michael Douglas	Sydney Ice Dogs	Évry Viry Hockey 91
(Australia)	Connor Dowell	Sydney Ice Dogs	Reach Rebels
(Australia)	Robert Duchemin	Newcastle Northstars	No team
(Canada)	Jean Dupuy	Canberra Brave	Podhale Nowy Targ
(Canada)	Mitchell Dyck	Brisbane Lightning	Winkler Royals
(New Zealand)	Chris Eaden	Sydney Bears	Phoenix Thunder
(Canada)	Sean Ellison	Sydney Ice Dogs	Reach Rebels
(Australia)	Lachlan Fixter	Brisbane Lightning	Brisbane Spitfires
(Canada)	Logan Flodell	Melbourne Mustangs	Mechelen Golden Sharks
(Canada)	Rylan Freed	Melbourne Mustangs	St. Brieux/Lake Lenore Rivals
(Australia)	Christian Fuschini	Brisbane Lightning	No team
(Australia)	Jackson Gallagher	Canberra Brave	No team
(New Zealand)	Matheson Graham	Melbourne Mustangs	No team
(Australia)	Quentin Greenwood	Brisbane Lightning	No team
(Australia)	Joey Gunner	Sydney Bears	Polyflor Raptors
(Australia)	Jacob Haley	Melbourne Mustangs	No team
(Australia)	Sean Hamilton	Perth Thunder	Northern North Stars
(Malaysia)	Mohd Hariz Ananda	Melbourne Mustangs	Central Oklahoma Bronchos
(Australia)	Tom Harkness	Brisbane Lightning	Southern Drop Bears
(Australia)	Joshua Healey	Perth Thunder	Northern North Stars
(Australia)	Marcus Henderson	Brisbane Lightning	West Coast Flyers Orange
(United States)	Lucas Herrmann	Sydney Bears	Etoile Noire de Strasbourg
(Australia)	Marcus Hosen	Sydney Ice Dogs	Reach Rebels
(Sweden)	Samuel Hou Gustafsson	Central Coast Rhinos	Monroe Moccasins
(Australia)	Ronan Hoy	Brisbane Lightning	No team
(Japan)	Mitsuaki Inoue	Newcastle Northstars	No team
(Australia)	Patrick Ivens	Brisbane Lightning	Southern Drop Bears
(Australia)	Michael James	Melbourne Ice	No team
(Australia)	Eugene Ju	Sydney Bears	Polyflor Raptors
(New Zealand)	CJ Kemp	Sydney Ice Dogs	Reach Rebels
(Australia)	John Kennedy	Perth Thunder	No team
(Australia)	Brendan Kleipas	Melbourne Ice	Sydney Bombers
(Australia)	Joshua Kleipas	Central Coast Rhinos	Sydney Bombers
(United States)	Roman Kraemer	Melbourne Ice	Carolina Thunderbirds
(Australia)	Toby Kubara	Canberra Brave	No team
(Canada)	Chris Kushneriuk	Sydney Bears	North Dundas Rockets
(Australia)	Samuel Lammert	Newcastle Northstars	No team
(Australia)	Matthew Lavergne	Brisbane Lightning	No team
(Canada)	Chris Lawrence	Melbourne Mustangs	No team
(Australia)	Reece Lukowiak	Perth Thunder	Cockburn Blackhawks
(Australia)	Joseph Maatouk	Canberra Brave	No team
(Canada)	Alex MacDonald	Sydney Ice Dogs	Nijmegen Devils
(Japan)	Kenta Matsukane	Canberra Brave	Yokohama Grits
(Canada)	Kyler Matthews	Newcastle Northstars	Birmingham Bulls
(Canada)	Justin Maylan	Canberra Brave	Rapaces de Gap
(Australia)	Stephen McCann	Brisbane Lightning	No team
(Australia)	Noah McMillan	Perth Thunder	No team
(Canada)	Jordan McTaggart	Brisbane Lightning	Falher Pirates
(Canada)	Curtis Meger	Brisbane Lightning	Carlyle Cougars
(Australia)	Max Miller	Sydney Ice Dogs	Reach Rebels
(Australia)	Nathan Moncrieff	Sydney Bears	Polyflor Raptors
(Australia)	Noah Moncrieff	Sydney Bears	Canterbury Red Devils
(Australia)	Thomas Moncrieff	Sydney Bears	Canterbury Red Devils
(Australia)	Matt Musumeci	Sydney Ice Dogs	Sydney Bombers
(Australia)	Adrian Nash	Newcastle Northstars	No team
(Australia)	Oscar Noone	Sydney Ice Dogs	Sydney Bombers
(Australia)	Stepan Olkin	Sydney Ice Dogs	Sydney Bombers
(Australia)	Sean Oultram	Newcastle Northstars	Newcastle Northstars (ECSL)
(Australia)	Harrison Paraskevis	Melbourne Mustangs	No team
(Australia)	Rhys Pelliccione	Perth Thunder	Northern North Stars
(Australia)	Jason Polglase	Central Coast Rhinos	No team
(Hungary)	Patrik Popovics	Brisbane Lightning	No team
(Australia)	Hamish Powell	Newcastle Northstars	No team
(Russia)	Vladislav Rachinsky	Melbourne Mustangs	No team
(Australia)	Jack Ransome	Sydney Ice Dogs	Reach Rebels
(Australia)	Harvey Rigg	Melbourne Mustangs	No team
(Australia)	Jake Riley	Sydney Bears	Adelaide Jokers
(Sweden)	Taegan Rippon	Sydney Bears	Reach Rebels
(Australia)	Drew Robson	Newcastle Northstars	No team
(Australia)	Jayden Ryan	Newcastle Northstars	Newcastle Northstars (ECSL)
(Australia)	Alistair Rye	Central Coast Rhinos	No team
(Australia)	Anthony Santilli	Brisbane Lightning	No team
(Tunisia)	Adrien Sebag	Central Coast Rhinos	Coqs de Courbevoie
(Australia)	Taj Siah	Perth Thunder	West Coast Flyers
(Canada)	Andrew Smardon	Central Coast Rhinos	No team
(Australia)	Paul Smith	Central Coast Rhinos	No team
(United States)	Jeff Solow	Melbourne Ice	No team
(Philippines)	Kenwrick Sze	Sydney Ice Dogs	Reach Rebels
(Australia)	Jesse Thompson	Melbourne Mustangs	Saints Monarchs IHC
(Australia)	Mac Tutton	Sydney Bears	New Hampshire Avalanche
(Finland)	Samuli Vainionpää	Sydney Bears	Kristianstads IK
(Hungary)	Nátán Vertes	Perth Thunder	Budapest Akademia HC
(United States)	Aiden Wagner	Newcastle Northstars	Fayetteville Marksmen
(Canada)	Josh Walt	Melbourne Ice	No team
(Australia)	Aidan Wardlaw	Central Coast Rhinos	No team
(Australia)	Alexander Wardlaw	Central Coast Rhinos	No team
(Australia)	Callum Wardlaw	Central Coast Rhinos	Sydney Heat
(Australia)	Lachlan White	Canberra Brave	Canberra Rebels
(Canada)	Alexander Yuill	Newcastle Northstars	Deseronto Bulldogs

== Regular season ==
=== Fixtures and results ===
The 2025 regular season consists of 112 games that are scheduled to run from 5 April 2025 to 24 August 2025. Teams are ranked in a single standings table, with conferences removed in 2025. Each team plays a total of 28 regular season games, playing each other team four times times (two at home and two away). A new AIHL regular season attendance record was set in 2025. 2,964 people attended the maiden AIHL game at the AIS Arena on 31 May 2025 in Canberra between the Canberra Brave and Adelaide Adrenaline.

==== April ====
April
Game #	Date	Time	Away	Score	Home	Location	Recap
1	5 Apr 2025	4:45 PM	Canberra Brave	5–6	Brisbane Lightning	IceWorld Boondall
2	5 Apr 2025	5:00 PM	Central Coast Rhinos	1–10	Melbourne Mustangs	O'Brien Icehouse
3	5 Apr 2025	4:00 PM	Newcastle Northstars	4–7	Perth Thunder	Perth Ice Arena
4	6 Apr 2025	2:00 PM	Central Coast Rhinos	9–8 (OT)	Melbourne Ice	O'Brien Icehouse
5	6 Apr 2025	3:45 PM	Canberra Brave	4–3 (OT)	Brisbane Lightning	IceWorld Boondall
6	6 Apr 2025	4:00 PM	Newcastle Northstars	1–6	Perth Thunder	Perth Ice Arena
7	12 Apr 2025	5:00 PM	Brisbane Lightning	2–1 (OT)	Melbourne Ice	O'Brien Icehouse
8	12 Apr 2025	5:00 PM	Perth Thunder	6–4	Canberra Brave	Phillip Ice Skating Centre
9	12 Apr 2025	5:00 PM	Central Coast Rhinos	1–2 (OT)	Newcastle Northstars	Hunter Ice Skating Stadium
10	13 Apr 2025	2:00 PM	Brisbane Lightning	3–4 (OT)	Melbourne Mustangs	O'Brien Icehouse
11	13 Apr 2025	3:30 PM	Newcastle Northstars	7–6 (OT)	Central Coast Rhinos	Erina Ice Arena
12	13 Apr 2025	4:45 PM	Perth Thunder	7–2	Canberra Brave	Phillip Ice Skating Centre
13	26 Apr 2025	3:30 PM	Melbourne Mustangs	6–1	Central Coast Rhinos	Erina Ice Arena
14	26 Apr 2025	4:45 PM	Canberra Brave	6–5 (OT)	Adelaide Adrenaline	Adelaide Ice Arena
15	26 Apr 2025	4:00 PM	Melbourne Ice	3–0	Perth Thunder	Perth Ice Arena
16	27 Apr 2025	3:30 PM	Melbourne Mustangs	8–3	Newcastle Northstars	Hunter Ice Skating Stadium
17	27 Apr 2025	4:15 PM	Canberra Brave	5–2	Adelaide Adrenaline	Adelaide Ice Arena
18	27 Apr 2025	4:00 PM	Melbourne Ice	9–3	Perth Thunder	Perth Ice Arena

==== May ====
May
Game #	Date	Time	Away	Score	Home	Location	Recap
19	10 May 2025	4:45 PM	Perth Thunder	5–6	Brisbane Lightning	IceWorld Boondall
20	10 May 2025	5:00 PM	Newcastle Northstars	6–7	Canberra Brave	Phillip Ice Skating Centre
21	10 May 2025	4:45 PM	Melbourne Ice	12–2	Adelaide Adrenaline	Adelaide Ice Arena
22	11 May 2025	3:45 PM	Perth Thunder	3–2	Brisbane Lightning	IceWorld Boondall
23	11 May 2025	4:00 PM	Central Coast Rhinos	7–1	Newcastle Northstars	Hunter Ice Skating Stadium
24	11 May 2025	4:15 PM	Melbourne Ice	4–2	Adelaide Adrenaline	Adelaide Ice Arena
25	16 May 2025	7:30 PM	Melbourne Ice	5–2	Melbourne Mustangs	O'Brien Icehouse
26	17 May 2025	3:30 PM	Adelaide Adrenaline	4–5 (OT)	Central Coast Rhinos	Erina Ice Arena
27	17 May 2025	5:00 PM	Canberra Brave	2–10	Melbourne Ice	O'Brien Icehouse
28	18 May 2025	2:00 PM	Canberra Brave	2–10	Melbourne Mustangs	O'Brien Icehouse
29	18 May 2025	4:00 PM	Adelaide Adrenaline	1–6	Newcastle Northstars	Hunter Ice Skating Stadium
30	24 May 2025	4:45 PM	Central Coast Rhinos	5–7	Brisbane Lightning	Iceworld Boondall
31	24 May 2025	5:00 PM	Perth Thunder	8–9 (OT)	Melbourne Ice	O'Brien Icehouse
32	24 May 2025	4:45 PM	Newcastle Northstars	11–3	Adelaide Adrenaline	Adelaide Ice Arena
33	25 May 2025	2:00 PM	Perth Thunder	8–0	Melbourne Mustangs	O'Brien Icehouse
34	25 May 2025	3:45 PM	Central Coast Rhinos	2–4	Brisbane Lightning	IceWorld Boondall
35	25 May 2025	4:00 PM	Newcastle Northstars	7–3	Adelaide Adrenaline	Adelaide Ice Arena
36	30 May 2025	7:30 PM	Melbourne Mustangs	3–2 (OT)	Melbourne Ice	O'Brien Icehouse
37	31 May 2025	5:00 PM	Central Coast Rhinos	2–6	Melbourne Mustangs	O'Brien Icehouse
38	31 May 2025	5:00 PM	Adelaide Adrenaline	3–2	Canberra Brave	AIS Arena

==== June ====
June
Game #	Date	Time	Away	Score	Home	Location	Recap
39	1 Jun 2025	2:00 PM	Central Coast Rhinos	1–3	Melbourne Ice	O'Brien Icehouse
40	1 Jun 2025	4:45 PM	Adelaide Adrenaline	1–7	Canberra Brave	AIS Arena
41	7 Jun 2025	3:30 PM	Melbourne Ice	9–2	Central Coast Rhinos	Erina Ice Arena
42	7 Jun 2025	4:45 PM	Melbourne Mustangs	3–5	Brisbane Lightning	IceWorld Boondall
43	7 Jun 2025	5:00 PM	Canberra Brave	4–6	Newcastle Northstars	Hunter Ice Skating Stadium
44	7 Jun 2025	4:00 PM	Adelaide Adrenaline	7–4	Perth Thunder	Perth Ice Arena
45	8 Jun 2025	3:30 PM	Melbourne Ice	5–3	Newcastle Northstars	Hunter Ice Skating Stadium
46	8 Jun 2025	3:45 PM	Melbourne Mustangs	6–9	Brisbane Lightning	IceWorld Boondall
47	8 Jun 2025	4:00 PM	Adelaide Adrenaline	4–7	Perth Thunder	Perth Ice Arena
48	13 Jun 2025	7:30 PM	Melbourne Ice	7–3	Melbourne Mustangs	O'Brien Icehouse
49	14 Jun 2025	5:00 PM	Perth Thunder	2–6	Melbourne Ice	O'Brien Icehouse
50	14 Jun 2025	5:00 PM	Brisbane Lightning	8–6	Canberra Brave	AIS Arena
51	14 Jun 2025	4:45 PM	Central Coast Rhinos	2–7	Adelaide Adrenaline	Adelaide Ice Arena
52	15 Jun 2025	2:00 PM	Perth Thunder	3–4	Melbourne Mustangs	O'Brien Icehouse
53	15 Jun 2025	4:45 PM	Brisbane Lightning	4–6	Canberra Brave	AIS Arena
54	15 Jun 2025	4:15 PM	Central Coast Rhinos	1–4	Adelaide Adrenaline	Adelaide Ice Arena
55	21 Jun 2025	3:30 PM	Perth Thunder	6–5	Central Coast Rhinos	Erina Ice Arena
56	21 Jun 2025	4:45 PM	Melbourne Ice	5–4 (OT)	Brisbane Lightning	IceWorld Boondall
57	21 Jun 2025	5:00 PM	Melbourne Mustangs	4–7	Newcastle Northstars	Hunter Ice Skating Stadium
58	22 Jun 2025	3:30 PM	Melbourne Mustangs	3–6	Central Coast Rhinos	Erina Ice Arena
59	22 Jun 2025	3:45 PM	Melbourne Ice	12–5	Brisbane Lightning	IceWorld Boondall
60	22 Jun 2025	4:00 PM	Perth Thunder	2–3 (OT)	Newcastle Northstars	Hunter Ice Skating Stadium
61	28 Jun 2025	3:30 PM	Canberra Brave	9–6	Central Coast Rhinos	Erina Ice Arena
62	28 Jun 2025	5:00 PM	Melbourne Ice	6–3	Newcastle Northstars	Hunter Ice Skating Stadium
63	28 Jun 2025	5:00 PM	Adelaide Adrenaline	0–4	Melbourne Mustangs	O'Brien Icehouse
64	28 Jun 2025	4:00 PM	Brisbane Lightning	2–11	Perth Thunder	Perth Ice Arena
65	29 Jun 2025	2:00 PM	Adelaide Adrenaline	4–8	Melbourne Mustangs	O'Brien Icehouse
66	29 Jun 2025	3:30 PM	Melbourne Ice	10–4	Central Coast Rhinos	Erina Ice Arena
67	29 Jun 2025	4:00 PM	Canberra Brave	4–3	Newcastle Northstars	Hunter Ice Skating Stadium
68	29 Jun 2025	4:00 PM	Brisbane Lightning	4–5 (OT)	Perth Thunder	Perth Ice Arena

==== July ====
July
Game #	Date	Time	Away	Score	Home	Location	Recap
69	4 Jul 2025	7:30 PM	Melbourne Mustangs	2–5	Melbourne Ice	O'Brien Icehouse
70	5 Jul 2025	5:00 PM	Newcastle Northstars	6–8	Melbourne Ice	O'Brien Icehouse
71	5 Jul 2025	5:00 PM	Central Coast Rhinos	2–13	Canberra Brave	AIS Arena
72	5 Jul 2025	4:45 PM	Brisbane Lightning	7–4	Adelaide Adrenaline	Adelaide Ice Arena
73	6 Jul 2025	2:00 PM	Newcastle Northstars	8–5	Melbourne Mustangs	O'Brien Icehouse
74	6 Jul 2025	4:15 PM	Brisbane Lightning	4–2	Adelaide Adrenaline	Adelaide Ice Arena
75	12 Jul 2025	5:00 PM	Brisbane Lightning	3–7	Newcastle Northstars	Hunter Ice Skating Stadium
76	12 Jul 2025	5:00 PM	Melbourne Mustangs	0–4	Canberra Brave	AIS Arena
77	12 Jul 2025	4:00 PM	Central Coast Rhinos	2–8	Perth Thunder	Perth Ice Arena
78	13 Jul 2025	3:30 PM	Brisbane Lightning	4–8	Newcastle Northstars	Hunter Ice Skating Stadium
79	13 Jul 2025	4:45 PM	Melbourne Mustangs	4–8	Canberra Brave	AIS Arena
80	13 Jul 2025	4:00 PM	Central Coast Rhinos	0–8	Perth Thunder	Perth Ice Arena
81	19 Jul 2025	5:00 PM	Perth Thunder	0–4	Newcastle Northstars	Hunter Ice Skating Stadium
82	19 Jul 2025	5:00 PM	Melbourne Ice	2–5	Canberra Brave	AIS Arena
83	19 Jul 2025	4:45 PM	Melbourne Mustangs	1–5	Adelaide Adrenaline	Adelaide Ice Arena
84	20 Jul 2025	3:30 PM	Perth Thunder	10–1	Central Coast Rhinos	Erina Ice Arena
85	20 Jul 2025	4:45 PM	Melbourne Ice	3–9	Canberra Brave	AIS Arena
86	20 Jul 2025	4:15 PM	Melbourne Mustangs	4–3	Adelaide Adrenaline	Adelaide Ice Arena
87	26 Jul 2025	4:45 PM	Adelaide Adrenaline	4–3	Brisbane Lightning	IceWorld Boondall
88	26 Jul 2025	5:00 PM	Newcastle Northstars	8–1	Melbourne Mustangs	O'Brien Icehouse
89	27 Jul 2025	2:00 PM	Newcastle Northstars	5–7	Melbourne Ice	O'Brien Icehouse
90	27 Jul 2025	3:45 PM	Adelaide Adrenaline	7–3	Brisbane Lightning	IceWorld Boondall

==== August ====
August
Game #	Date	Time	Away	Score	Home	Location	Recap
91	2 Aug 2025	3:30 PM	Newcastle Northstars	6–3	Central Coast Rhinos	Erina Ice Arena
92	2 Aug 2025	5:00 PM	Brisbane Lightning	4–8	Melbourne Mustangs	O'Brien Icehouse
93	2 Aug 2025	4:00 PM	Canberra Brave	2–11	Perth Thunder	Perth Ice Arena
94	3 Aug 2025	2:00 PM	Brisbane Lightning	6–10	Melbourne Ice	O'Brien Icehouse
95	3 Aug 2025	4:00 PM	Canberra Brave	6–3	Perth Thunder	Perth Ice Arena
96	9 Aug 2025	5:00 PM	Adelaide Adrenaline	4–6	Newcastle Northstars	Hunter Ice Skating Stadium
97	9 Aug 2025	5:00 PM	Central Coast Rhinos	3–4	Canberra Brave	AIS Arena
98	10 Aug 2025	3:30 PM	Adelaide Adrenaline	8–5	Central Coast Rhinos	Erina Ice Arena
99	10 Aug 2025	4:45 PM	Newcastle Northstars	4–7	Canberra Brave	AIS Arena
100	16 Aug 2025	3:30 PM	Brisbane Lightning	8–2	Central Coast Rhinos	Erina Ice Arena
101	16 Aug 2025	5:00 PM	Canberra Brave	6–7	Melbourne Mustangs	O'Brien Icehouse
102	16 Aug 2025	4:45 PM	Perth Thunder	2–5	Adelaide Adrenaline	Adelaide Ice Arena
103	17 Aug 2025	2:00 PM	Canberra Brave	4–3 (OT)	Melbourne Ice	O'Brien Icehouse
104	17 Aug 2025	3:30 PM	Brisbane Lightning	6–7 (SO)	Central Coast Rhinos	Erina Ice Arena
105	17 Aug 2025	4:15 PM	Perth Thunder	3–4	Adelaide Adrenaline	Adelaide Ice Arena
106	23 Aug 2025	4:45 PM	Newcastle Northstars	11–1	Brisbane Lightning	IceWorld Boondall
107	23 Aug 2025	5:00 PM	Adelaide Adrenaline	3–11	Melbourne Ice	O'Brien Icehouse
108	23 Aug 2025	4:00 PM	Melbourne Mustangs	4–13	Perth Thunder	Perth Ice Arena
109	24 Aug 2025	2:00 PM	Adelaide Adrenaline	3–8	Melbourne Ice	O'Brien Icehouse
110	24 Aug 2025	3:30 PM	Canberra Brave	6–2	Central Coast Rhinos	Erina Ice Arena
111	24 Aug 2025	3:45 PM	Newcastle Northstars	4–8	Brisbane Lightning	IceWorld Boondall
112	24 Aug 2025	4:00 PM	Melbourne Mustangs	7–11	Perth Thunder	Perth Ice Arena

Key:

Winner

=== Standings ===
==== Overall ====
Pos	Team	Pld	W	OTW	OTL	L	GF	GA	GD	Pts	Qualification or relegation
1	Melbourne Ice	28	20	2	4	2	183	103	+80	68	2025 Goodall Cup Semi Finals
2	Canberra Brave	28	15	3	0	10	149	130	+19	51	2025 Goodall Cup Semi Finals
3	Perth Thunder	28	15	1	2	10	162	110	+52	46	2025 Goodall Cup Preliminary Finals
4	Newcastle Northstars	28	13	3	0	12	150	125	+25	45	2025 Goodall Cup Preliminary Finals
5	Brisbane Lightning	28	11	1	5	11	131	157	−26	40	2025 Goodall Cup Preliminary Finals
6	Melbourne Mustangs	28	11	2	0	15	127	143	−16	37	2025 Goodall Cup Preliminary Finals
7	Adelaide Adrenaline	28	10	0	2	16	104	148	−44	32	
8	Central Coast Rhinos	28	2	3	2	21	93	183	−90	14	

Source: AIHL Elite Prospects
Rules for classification:
Tie-break: 1) points; 2) points percentage; 3) head to head; 4) goal difference; 5) goals scored; 6) coin toss
Points: 3 points for regulation win; 2 points for OT or SO win; 1 point for OT or SO loss; 0 points for regulation loss

=== Statistics ===
==== Skater statistics ====
2025 AIHL season top-ten skater statistics for points, goals, assists and penalty minutes.

Points
#	Name	Team	Pos	Pts
1	(Canada) Tanner Hopps	BL	F	70
2	(Japan) Yu Hikosaka	PT	F	68
3	(Canada) Carson Miller	BL	F	66
4	(United States) David Booth	MI	F	64
5	(Sweden) Joakim Erdugan	MI	F	64
6	(Romania) Evgeny Skachkov	NN	F	61
7	(Canada) Kolton Shindle	MI	F	60
8	(Australia) Mackenzie Caruana	MI	F	60
9	(Sweden) Kim Tallberg	NN	F	59
10	(Australia) Casey Kubara	NN	F	50

Goals
#	Name	Team	Pos	G
1	(Japan) Yu Hikosaka	PT	F	36
2	(United States) David Booth	MI	F	34
3	(Canada) Tanner Hopps	BL	F	33
4	(Canada) Kolton Shindle	MI	F	33
5	(Sweden) Kim Tallberg	NN	F	28
6	(Canada) Carson Miller	BL	F	23
7	(Australia) Mackenzie Caruana	MI	F	23
8	(Romania) Evgeny Skachkov	NN	F	21
9	(Canada) Josh Adkins	AA	F	20
10	(Australia) Tyrone Bronte	MI	F	20

Assists
#	Name	Team	Pos	A
1	(Canada) Tanner Hopps	BL	F	47
2	(Sweden) Joakim Erdugan	MI	F	45
3	(Canada) Carson Miller	BL	F	43
4	(Romania) Evgeny Skachkov	NN	F	40
5	(Australia) Mackenzie Caruana	MI	F	37
6	(Australia) Casey Kubara	NN	F	34
7	(Japan) Yu Hikosaka	PT	F	32
8	(United Kingdom) Robert Lachowicz	PT	F	32
9	(Sweden) Kim Tallberg	NN	F	31
10	(Canada) Scott Timmins	MM	F	31

Penalty minutes
#	Name	Team	Pos	PIM
1	(Australia) Darcy Flanagan	AA	D	145
2	(Canada) Mac Roy	MM	F	82
3	(Australia) Jamie Bourke	MI	F	79
4	(Australia) Jordan Warren	MM	F	78
5	(Australia) Gustav Remler-Jensen	CR	F	78
6	(Australia) Joey MacDougall	AA	F	77
7	(New Zealand) Dominic Canic	CB	F	70
8	(New Zealand) Bradley Apps	MM	F	70
9	(Australia) Tyerell Clare	MM	D	69
10	(Jamaica) Kolby Johnson	PT	F	68

==== Goaltender statistics ====
2025 AIHL season top-ten^{1} goaltender statistics for goals against average and save percentage.

^{1} only goaltenders who have played 10 or more games qualify for these lists

Goals against average
#	Name	Team	Pos	GAA
1	(Japan) Tatsunoshin Ishida	MI	G	3.37
2	(Australia) Aleksi Toivonen	PT	G	3.44
3	(Australia) Anthony Kimlin	MM	G	3.66
4	(Australia) Charles Smart	NN	G	3.77
5	(Australia) Alex Tétreault	CB	G	4.38
6	(Australia) Matus Trnka	BL	G	4.57
7	(New Zealand) Joel Hasselman	CB	G	4.60
8	(Canada) Cale Dolan	AA	G	4.77
9	(Canada) Anand Oberoi	CR	G	6.27
10	(Australia) Jakob Doornbos	BL	G	6.95

Save percentage
#	Name	Team	Pos	SV%
1	(Japan) Tatsunoshin Ishida	MI	G	.908
2	(Australia) Anthony Kimlin	MM	G	.903
3	(Australia) Aleksi Toivonen	PT	G	.895
4	(Australia) Matus Trnka	BL	G	.885
5	(Australia) Alex Tétreault	PT	G	.869
6	(Canada) Anand Oberoi	CR	G	.869
7	(Australia) Charles Smart	NN	G	.866
8	(New Zealand) Joel Hasselman	CB	G	.862
9	(Australia) Jakob Doornbos	BL	G	.858
10	(Canada) Cale Dolan	AA	G	.852

=== Awards ===
==== Skaters Network player of the week ====
Each week the AIHL, through sponsorship, names a player of the week.
The award is based on the following criteria:

- individual performance, including significant game statistics;
- contribution to the team's success through individual leadership abilities; and
- performance off the ice, including community engagement.

Round	Awarded to	Pos	Ref
1	(Australia) Tyler Kubara	F	Ref
2	(Australia) Jakob Doornbos	G	Ref
3	(Australia) Tyrone Bronte	F	Ref
4	(Australia) Mackenzie Caruana	F	Ref
5	(Australia) Ivan Kuleshov	F	Ref
6	(Australia) Aleksi Toivonen	G	Ref
7	(Australia) Cameron Todd	F	Ref
8	(Australia) Arum Rapchuk	F	Ref
9	(Australia) Thomas Papas	G	Ref
10	(Australia) Mackenzie Caruana	F	Ref
11	(Australia) Jordan Kyros	F	Ref
12	(Australia) Casey Kubara	F	Ref
13	(Australia) Alexandre Tétreault	G	Ref
14	(Australia) Charlie Smart	G	Ref
15	(Australia) Nathaniel Benson	F	Ref
16	(Australia) Yannic Lodge	F	Ref
17	(Australia) Dmitri Kuleshov	F	Ref
18	(Australia) Zachary Boyle	D	Ref
19	(Australia) Wehebe Darge	F	Ref

==== Season awards ====
Below lists the 2025 AIHL season award winners.

Award	Name	Team
MVP	(Japan) Yu Hikosaka	Perth Thunder
Goaltender	(Australia) Aleksi Toivonen	Perth Thunder
Defenceman	(Australia) Bray Crowder	Canberra Brave
Local	(Australia) Wehebe Darge	Newcastle Northstars
Rookie	(Australia) Artem Astafiev (Australia) Luka Loria	Melbourne Mustangs; Adelaide Adrenaline
Coach	(Australia) Benjamin Breault	Perth Thunder
Finals MVP	(Australia) Mackenzie Caruana	Melbourne Ice

== Goodall Cup playoffs ==
For season 2025, the AIHL Finals format remained the same as 2024. 6 teams qualify for 5 games over 3 days at 1 venue. The 4 lowest ranked teams from the regular season enter on Friday in the preliminary finals with the top two ranked teams entering on Saturday in the semi-finals. Winner from each game advances with the loser eliminated. Winner of the grand final on Sunday is crowned AIHL champions and claim the historic Goodall Cup. The grand final man of the match is named the AIHL Finals MVP.

The Finals weekend in 2025 was held at O’Brien Icehouse in Docklands, Melbourne. This is the twelfth time the Icehouse has hosted the AIHL Finals weekend since it first opened in 2010. The District Docklands held a AIHL Finals Festival at the shopping centre that included a street hockey shootout, AIHL trivia challenge, player meet and greets, photos with the Goodall Cup and daily prizes. The event was broadcast on AIHL.TV and for the first time ESPN Australia, making it accessible on platforms including Disney+, Kayo Sports, Foxtel GO and Fetch TV.

The Melbourne Mustangs, Brisbane Lightning, Newcastle Northstars, Perth Thunder all qualified for the preliminary finals in 2025. The Thunder and Northstars advanced to the semi-finals with victories over the Lightning and Mustangs. The Canberra Brave and Melbourne Ice qualified for the semi-finals and advanced to the grand final after defeating the Thunder and Northstars. The grand final was a repeat of 2024, with the Ice up against the Brave for the title and Cup. However, unlike 2024, the Melbourne Ice defeated the Brave 7-3 to claim their 5th Goodall Cup and their first since 2017. Ice captain, Mac Caruana, was named Finals MVP after the game.

Preliminary-finals
29 August – Melbourne
Melbourne Mustangs	2
Perth Thunder	5
29 August – Melbourne
Brisbane Lightning	1
Newcastle Northstars	6

Semi-finals
30 August – Melbourne
Perth Thunder	1
Canberra Brave	6
30 August – Melbourne
Newcastle Northstars	4
Melbourne Ice	6

Grand final
31 August – Melbourne
Canberra Brave	3
Melbourne Ice	7

All times are UTC+10:00

=== Preliminary-finals ===
29 August 2025; 15:00	Melbourne Mustangs	2–5 (1–1, 1–2, 0–2)	Perth Thunder	O’Brien Icehouse

Game reference

(Australia) Anthony Kimlin
Goalies
(Australia) Aleksi Toivonen
Referees:
Jeffrey Scott
David Gal
Linesmen:
Nick Air
Beth Bowshall

	0 – 1	Lodge (Lyashenko, Johnson)
(Wishart, Dunkley) Lindal	1 – 1
	1 – 2	Langille (Kyros)
(Lindal, Klomp) Dunkley	2 – 2
	2 – 3	Kudla (Langille, Kyros)
	2 – 4	Hamilton (Kyros)
	2 – 5	Tenosalmi (Hikosaka, Hamilton)

8 min
Penalties
15 min
42
Shots
42

29 August 2025; 19:00	Brisbane Lightning	1–6 (1–2, 0–3, 0–1)	Newcastle Northstars	O’Brien Icehouse

Game reference

(Australia) Matus Trnka
Goalies
(Australia) Charles Smart
Referees:
Fraser Ohlson
Rob Love
Linesmen:
Hamish Young
Jake O'Brien

	0 – 1	Darge (C.Kubara)
(Campbell, Hopps) Miller	1 – 1
	1 – 2	Skachkov (Tallberg, Ellen)
	1 – 3	Annesley (Tallberg, C.Kubara)
	1 – 4	Taylor (Skachkov)
	1 – 5	Tallberg (Skachkov, Drolet)
	1 – 6	C.Kubara (Darge)

8 min
Penalties
6 min
21
Shots
38

=== Semi-finals ===
30 August 2025; 14:00	Newcastle Northstars	4–6 (0–2, 3–3, 1–1)	Melbourne Ice	O’Brien Icehouse

Game reference

(Australia) Charles Smart
Goalies
(Japan) Tatsunoshin Ishida
Referees:
Fraser Ohlson
David Gal
Linesmen:
Jake O'Brien
Nick Air

	0 – 1	Carini (T.Bronte)
	0 – 2	Booth (Caruana, Bergholt)
	0 – 3	Bourke (Caruana, Shindle)
(Tallberg, Drolet) Skachkov	1 – 3
(R.Klugerman, Darge) Ellen	2 – 3
(Tallberg, Funes) Skachkov	3 – 3
	3 – 4	Caruana (T.Bronte)
	3 – 5	Erdugan (T.Bronte, Booth)
	3 – 6	T.Bronte (Booth, Erdugan)
(Hawes, Drolet) Tallberg	4 – 6

4 min
Penalties
10 min
51
Shots
37

30 August 2025; 19:00	Perth Thunder	1–6 (0–0, 1–2, 0–4)	Canberra Brave	O’Brien Icehouse

Game reference

(Australia) Aleksi Toivonen
Goalies
(Australia) Alexandre Tetreault
Referees:
Rob Love
Jeffrey Scott
Linesmen:
Beth Bowshall
Hamish Young

	0 – 1	Ratcliffe (Carnbäck, Carey)
(Jones, Hikosaka) Kyros	1 – 1
	1 – 2	Marks (Ratcliffe, Čanić)
	1 – 3	Viikilä (Ratcliffe)
	1 – 4	Clark (Carnbäck, Ratcliffe)
	1 – 5	Clark (Marks)
	1 – 6	Clark (Viikilä, Carnbäck)

8 min
Penalties
8 min
22
Shots
35

=== Final ===
31 August 2025; 14:00	Canberra Brave	3–7 (0–3, 3–1, 0–3)	Melbourne Ice	O’Brien Icehouse

Game reference

(Australia) Alexandre Tetreault
Goalies
(Japan) Tatsunoshin Ishida
Referees:
David Gal
Joey Theriault
Linesmen:
David Rehak
Jake O'Brien

	0 – 1	Shindle (Cachia, Caruana)
	0 – 2	Erdugan (Stringer, Berholt)
	0 – 3	Caruana (Unassisted)
(Carnbäck, Viikilä) Ratcliffe	1 – 3
(Carey) Miettinen	2 – 3
(Viikilä, Ratcliffe) Carey	3 – 3
	3 – 4	T.Bronte (Booth, Erdugan)
	3 – 5	Caruana (McMahon, D.Bronte)
	3 – 6	Bourke (Shindle, McMahon)
	3 – 7	Booth (T.bronte)

20 min
Penalties
14 min
29
Shots
33
