= 2020 AIHL season =

- League: Australian Ice Hockey League
- Sport: Ice hockey
- Duration: 18 April 2020 – 23 August 2020 (cancelled)

AIHL seasons
- 2019 2021

The 2020 AIHL season was going to be the 21st season of the Australian Ice Hockey League (AIHL). It was originally scheduled to run from 18 April 2020 until 23 August 2020, with the Goodall Cup finals following on 29 August and 30 August 2020. However, on 12 March 2020 the league announced the postponement of the 2020 season to a to be determined date due to COVID-19. Then on 29 July 2020, the AIHL commission's return to play committee announced the official cancellation of the 2020 AIHL season due to July COVID outbreaks on the east coast as well as continued border closures for WA and SA. This marked the first time the Goodall Cup was not awarded since 1993, when the competition was cancelled as a result of financial problems.

== Teams ==
In 2020 the AIHL had planned to have 8 teams competing in the league.

2020 AIHL teams
Team	City	Arena	Head Coach
Adelaide Adrenaline	(South Australia) Adelaide	IceArenA	(Finland) Sami Mantere
CBR Brave	(Australian Capital Territory) Canberra	Phillip Ice Skating Centre	(Australia) Stuart Philps
Melbourne Ice	(Victoria (state)) Melbourne	O'Brien Icehouse	(Canada) Michael Marshall
Melbourne Mustangs	(Victoria (state)) Melbourne	O'Brien Icehouse	(Canada) Maxime Langelier-Parent
Newcastle Northstars	(New South Wales) Newcastle	Hunter Ice Skating Stadium	(Australia) John Kennedy
Perth Thunder	(Western Australia) Perth	Perth Ice Arena	(Canada) Ben Breault
Sydney Bears	(New South Wales) Sydney	Macquarie Ice Rink	(Australia) Ron Kuprowsky
Sydney Ice Dogs	(New South Wales) Sydney	Macquarie Ice Rink	(Australia) Andrew Petrie

== League business ==
On 11 February 2020, the AIHL announced the league would be adopting the international standard sixty minutes match length. Between 2013 and 2019 the AIHL ran fifty minute matches, while prior to that the league ran forty-five minute matches. The change increases the league's matches by ten minutes and standardises the period lengths to twenty minutes each. The change came into effect for the 2020 season. On 12 March 2020, the CBR Brave announced they would be livestreaming all home matches at Phillip Ice Skating Centre for the 2020 season. A partnership with production company Wonqy would deliver the stream. Later on 12 March 2020, AIHL commissioner, David Turik announced the 2020 season would be postponed due to the coronavirus pandemic (COVID-19). The AIHL Commission held consultation with the teams and took medical advice from State and Federal Governments in coming to the decision. The Commission did not release a new proposed start date for the 2020 season but will meet regularly to discuss progress and determine if there is a time period for the season to be moved to. In late July the AIHL commission's return to play committee released a public update to advise the 2020 season had been cancelled and would not go ahead. In early August, a new incorporated body was established in Brisbane, Queensland with the mission to expand the league and secure an AIHL licence for 2022.

=== Exhibition games ===
On 7 January 2020, the Melbourne Ice and Melbourne Mustangs co-announced the organisation of an exhibition charity match to be played between the two teams to raise money for the Victorian Bushfire Appeal. The match was scheduled for 19 January 2020 at O’Brien Icehouse. The Ice defeated the Mustangs 5–2 in the charity match with the event raising over $50,000.

On 13 January 2020, it was announced that the South Australian ice hockey community, including the Adelaide Adrenaline, Adelaide Rush and Avalanche alumni had arranged for an exhibition charity match for 9 February 2020. The match was named The Bushfire Appeal Ice Hockey Classic with teams broken into 'Locals' and 'Rest of the World'. In front of a packed out IceArenA, the Locals came from 6–4 down in the second intermission to claim a 7-6 (OT) victory. The Locals won with a golden goal scored by Adelaide Rush player Tash Farrier in the 3v3 overtime period. The event raised $23,951 with all money going to CFS Foundation and Kangaroo Island Mayoral Relief and Recovery Bushfire Fund to assist with the Adelaide Hills and Kangaroo Island fire recovery effort.

On 27 January 2020, the Sydney Ice Dogs and Sydney Bears announced they would hold a bushfire recovery appeal charity match between the two teams at Macquarie Ice Rink on 21 February 2020. All proceeds would go to the NSW Rural Fire Service and Australian Red Cross. The Bears defeated the Ice Dogs 6–3 in the event.

On 28 February 2020, Melbourne Mustangs announced the annual pre-season exhibition Melbourne derby involving the Mustangs and Ice would be held at the Icehouse on Saturday 4 April. On 16 March 2020, the Ice and Mustangs officially cancelled their pre-season exhibition game due to COVID-19 and the postponement of the AIHL season.

On 2 March 2020, Adelaide Adrenaline announced a pre-season exhibition match against a South Australian Select team for 21 March 2020 to be held at the Adelaide IceArenA. On 15 March 2020, the Adrenaline officially cancelled their pre-season exhibition game due to COVID-19 and the postponement of the AIHL season.

On 30 July 2020, one day after the cancellation of the 2020 AIHL season, the Newcastle Northstars and Sydney Ice Dogs announced the formation of the 2020 Hawkesbury Classic exhibition series between the two teams. The four match series was originally to be held at both the Hunter Ice Skating Stadium in Newcastle and Macquarie Ice Rink in Sydney between 2 August and 22 August 2020. On 14 August 2020, it was revealed the series would be extended by three matches, creating a full seven match series. Game One ended with the Ice Dogs claiming a 3–2 overtime victory to take a 1–0 lead in the series. Game two saw the Ice Dogs double their lead in the series to 2–0 with a 3–2 overtime victory. Game three was won by the Northstars in a 5–4 shootout victory, halving the Ice Dog's series lead to 2–1.

=== Personnel changes ===
On 11 January 2020, Adelaide Adrenaline announced former player and head coach Sami Mantere had been re-appointed as head coach for the 2020 season. Sami replaced outgoing head coach, Jim Fuyarchuk, who held the position for the last two seasons.

On 31 January 2020, Melbourne Ice announced their new head coach for 2020 would be Canadian Michael Marshall. Michael hails from Calgary, Alberta and joins the team off the back of four years coaching in Sweden.

On 8 February 2020, Perth Thunder announced Dave Ruck had ended his three-year tenure as head coach of the West Australian team. The 2017 AIHL coach of the year would be replaced by the recently retired former Thunder player, Ben Breault. The appointment is the first senior head coaching role for Breault.

On 24 February 2020, CBR Brave announced head coach Rob Starke would not be returning for the 2020 AIHL season. Starke had left Canberra and moved back to Canada for personal and professional reasons in the off-season. Rob left the Brave having guided the team to their first three titles including the 2018 Goodall Cup. On 27 February 2020, the Brave announced Stuart Philps as the team's new head coach and Rob's replacement.

=== Player transfers ===
==== Interclub transfers ====
Nat	Player	Previous team	New team	Ref
(New Zealand)	Benjamin Gavoille	Adelaide Adrenaline	Melbourne Ice	

* Mid-season transfer.

==== Retirements ====
Nat	Player	Team	New role	Ref
(Australia)	David Dunwoodie	Sydney Ice Dogs	—	
(Canada)	Ben Breault	Perth Thunder	Head coach (Thunder)	
(Australia)	David Lewis	CBR Brave	—	

==== New signings ====
Nat	Player	Previous team	New team	Ref
(Sweden)	Joakim Erdugan	Tranås AIF	Melbourne Ice	
(Canada)	Joel Rumpel	Stjernen Hockey	Sydney Ice Dogs	
(Sweden)	David Elmgren	HC Dalen	Melbourne Ice	
(New Zealand)	Ryan Martinoli	EHC Bülach U20	Melbourne Ice	

==== Players lost ====
Nat	Player	Previous team	New team	Ref
(Canada)	Mac Caruana	Melbourne Ice	No team	
(Australia)	Josef Rezek	Adelaide Adrenaline	No team	

== Regular season ==
The regular season began on 18 April 2020 and ran through to 23 August 2020 before the top four teams advanced to compete in the Goodall Cup finals weekend.

=== April ===
April fixtures and results
Date	Time	Away	Score	Home	Location	Recap
18 APR	17:00	Adelaide Adrenaline	X–X	Melbourne Ice	O’Brien Icehouse	TBA
18 APR	17:00	Newcastle Northstars	X–X	Sydney Bears	Macquarie Ice Rink	TBA
18 APR	17:00	Sydney Ice Dogs	X–X	CBR Brave	Phillip Ice Skating Centre	TBA
19 APR	14:00	Adelaide Adrenaline	X–X	Melbourne Mustangs	O’Brien Icehouse	TBA
25 APR	16:30	Melbourne Mustangs	X–X	Adelaide Adrenaline	IceArena	TBA
25 APR	17:00	Sydney Bears	X–X	Newcastle Northstars	Hunter Ice Skating Stadium	TBA
25 APR	17:00	CBR Brave	X–X	Melbourne Ice	O’Brien Icehouse	TBA
26 APR	14:00	CBR Brave	X–X	Melbourne Ice	O’Brien Icehouse	TBA
26 APR	16:30	Melbourne Mustangs	X–X	Adelaide Adrenaline	IceArena	TBA
26 APR	17:00	Newcastle Northstars	X–X	Sydney Ice Dogs	Macquarie Ice Rink	TBA

=== May ===
May fixtures and results
Date	Time	Away	Score	Home	Location	Recap
2 MAY	16:30	Perth Thunder	X–X	Adelaide Adrenaline	IceArena	TBA
2 MAY	17:00	Newcastle Northstars	X–X	CBR Brave	Phillip Ice Skating Centre	TBA
2 MAY	17:00	Sydney Ice Dogs	X–X	Melbourne Ice	O’Brien Icehouse	TBA
3 MAY	14:00	Sydney Ice Dogs	X–X	Melbourne Mustangs	O’Brien Icehouse	TBA
3 MAY	16:30	Perth Thunder	X–X	Adelaide Adrenaline	IceArena	TBA
3 MAY	17:00	CBR Brave	X–X	Sydney Bears	Macquarie Ice Rink	TBA
8 MAY	19:30	Melbourne Ice	X–X	Melbourne Mustangs	O’Brien Icehouse	TBA
8 MAY	19:30	Sydney Ice Dogs	X–X	Sydney Bears	Macquarie Ice Rink	TBA
9 MAY	16:30	CBR Brave	X–X	Perth Thunder	Perth Ice Arena	TBA
9 MAY	17:00	Newcastle Northstars	X–X	Melbourne Ice	O’Brien Icehouse	TBA
9 MAY	17:00	Adelaide Adrenaline	X–X	Sydney Bears	Macquarie Ice Rink	TBA
10 MAY	14:00	Newcastle Northstars	X–X	Melbourne Mustangs	O’Brien Icehouse	TBA
10 MAY	16:30	CBR Brave	X–X	Perth Thunder	Perth Ice Arena	TBA
10 MAY	17:00	Adelaide Adrenaline	X–X	Sydney Ice Dogs	Macquarie Ice Rink	TBA
16 MAY	16:30	Sydney Bears	X–X	Adelaide Adrenaline	IceArena	TBA
16 MAY	17:00	Perth Thunder	X–X	Melbourne Ice	O’Brien Icehouse	TBA
16 MAY	17:00	CBR Brave	X–X	Sydney Ice Dogs	Macquarie Ice Rink	TBA
17 MAY	14:00	Perth Thunder	X–X	Melbourne Mustangs	O’Brien Icehouse	TBA
17 MAY	16:00	CBR Brave	X–X	Newcastle Northstars	Hunter Ice Skating Stadium	TBA
17 MAY	16:30	Sydney Bears	X–X	Adelaide Adrenaline	IceArena	TBA
23 MAY	16:30	Adelaide Adrenaline	X–X	Perth Thunder	Perth Ice Arena	TBA
23 MAY	17:00	Sydney Ice Dogs	X–X	Newcastle Northstars	Hunter Ice Skating Stadium	TBA
23 MAY	17:00	Melbourne Ice	X–X	Sydney Bears	Macquarie Ice Rink,	TBA
23 MAY	17:30	Melbourne Mustangs	X–X	CBR Brave	Phillip Ice Skating Centre	TBA
24 MAY	16:00	Melbourne Ice	X–X	Newcastle Northstars	Hunter Ice Skating Stadium	TBA
24 MAY	16:30	Adelaide Adrenaline	X–X	Perth Thunder	Perth Ice Arena	TBA
24 MAY	17:00	Melbourne Mustangs	X–X	Sydney Ice Dogs	Macquarie Ice Rink	TBA
29 MAY	19:30	Melbourne Mustangs	X–X	Melbourne Ice	O’Brien Icehouse	TBA
30 MAY	16:30	Sydney Ice Dogs	X–X	Adelaide Adrenaline	IceArena	TBA
30 MAY	17:00	Sydney Bears	X–X	Melbourne Mustangs	O’Brien Icehouse	TBA
30 MAY	17:30	CBR Brave	X–X	Newcastle Northstars	Hunter Ice Skating Stadium	TBA
31 MAY	14:00	Sydney Bears	X–X	Melbourne Ice	O’Brien Icehouse	TBA
31 MAY	16:30	Sydney Ice Dogs	X–X	Perth Thunder	Perth Ice Arena	TBA

=== June ===
June fixtures and results
Date	Time	Away	Score	Home	Location	Recap
6 JUN	17:00	Melbourne Mustangs	X–X	Newcastle Northstars	Hunter Ice Skating Stadium	TBA
6 JUN	17:00	Melbourne Ice	X–X	Sydney Ice Dogs	Macquarie Ice Rink	TBA
7 JUN	16:30	Melbourne Ice	X–X	CBR Brave	Phillip Ice Skating Centre	TBA
7 JUN	17:00	Melbourne Mustangs	X–X	Sydney Ice Dogs	Macquarie Ice Rink	TBA
12 JUN	19:30	Sydney Bears	X–X	Sydney Ice Dogs	Macquarie Ice Rink	TBA
13 JUN	16:30	Melbourne Ice	X–X	Perth Thunder	Perth Ice Arena	TBA
13 JUN	16:30	Newcastle Northstars	X–X	Adelaide Adrenaline	IceArena	TBA
13 JUN	17:00	CBR Brave	X–X	Sydney Ice Dogs	Macquarie Ice Rink	TBA
14 JUN	16:30	Melbourne Ice	X–X	Perth Thunder	Perth Ice Arena	TBA
14 JUN	16:30	Newcastle Northstars	X–X	Adelaide Adrenaline	IceArena	TBA
14 JUN	16:30	Sydney Bears	X–X	CBR Brave	Phillip Ice Skating Centre	TBA
20 JUN	17:00	Sydney Ice Dogs	X–X	Melbourne Mustangs	O’Brien Icehouse	TBA
20 JUN	17:00	Perth Thunder	X–X	Sydney Bears	Macquarie Ice Rink	TBA
20 JUN	17:30	Adelaide Adrenaline	X–X	CBR Brave	Phillip Ice Skating Centre	TBA
21 JUN	14:00	Sydney Ice Dogs	X–X	Melbourne Ice	O’Brien Icehouse	TBA
21 JUN	16:00	Perth Thunder	X–X	Newcastle Northstars	Hunter Ice Skating Stadium	TBA
21 JUN	16:30	Adelaide Adrenaline	X–X	CBR Brave	Phillip Ice Skating Centre	TBA
27 JUN	16:30	Melbourne Mustangs	X–X	Perth Thunder	Perth Ice Arena	TBA
27 JUN	16:30	CBR Brave	X–X	Adelaide Adrenaline	IceArena	TBA
27 JUN	17:00	Melbourne Ice	X–X	Newcastle Northstars	Hunter Ice Skating Stadium	TBA
27 JUN	17:00	Sydney Ice Dogs	X–X	Sydney Bears	Macquarie Ice Rink	TBA
28 JUN	16:30	Melbourne Mustangs	X–X	Perth Thunder	Perth Ice Arena	TBA
28 JUN	16:30	CBR Brave	X–X	Adelaide Adrenaline	IceArena	TBA
28 JUN	17:00	Melbourne Ice	X–X	Sydney Bears	Macquarie Ice Rink	TBA

=== July ===
July fixtures and results
Date	Time	Away	Score	Home	Location	Recap
4 JUL	17:00	Perth Thunder	X–X	Newcastle Northstars	Hunter Ice Skating Stadium	TBA
4 JUL	17:00	Adelaide Adrenaline	X–X	Sydney Ice Dogs	Macquarie Ice Rink	TBA
4 JUL	17:00	Sydney Bears	X–X	Melbourne Ice	O’Brien Icehouse	TBA
5 JUL	14:00	Sydney Bears	X–X	Melbourne Mustangs	O’Brien Icehouse	TBA
5 JUL	16:00	Adelaide Adrenaline	X–X	Newcastle Northstars	Hunter Ice Skating Stadium	TBA
5 JUL	17:00	Perth Thunder	X–X	Sydney Ice Dogs	Macquarie Ice Rink	TBA
10 JUL	19:30	Melbourne Mustangs	X–X	Melbourne Ice	O’Brien Icehouse	TBA
11 JUL	17:00	Newcastle Northstars	X–X	Melbourne Mustangs	O’Brien Icehouse	TBA
11 JUL	17:00	Perth Thunder	X–X	Sydney Ice Dogs	Macquarie Ice Rink	TBA
12 JUL	14:00	Newcastle Northstars	X–X	Melbourne Ice	O’Brien Icehouse	TBA
12 JUL	16:30	Sydney Ice Dogs	X–X	CBR Brave	Phillip Ice Skating Centre	TBA
12 JUL	17:00	Perth Thunder	X–X	Sydney Bears	Macquarie Ice Rink	TBA
18 JUL	16:30	Newcastle Northstars	X–X	Perth Thunder	Perth Ice Arena	TBA
18 JUL	17:00	Melbourne Mustangs	X–X	Sydney Bears	Macquarie Ice Rink	TBA
19 JUL	16:30	Newcastle Northstars	X–X	Perth Thunder	Perth Ice Arena	TBA
19 JUL	16:30	Melbourne Mustangs	X–X	CBR Brave	Phillip Ice Skating Centre	TBA
24 JUL	19:30	Sydney Bears	X–X	Sydney Ice Dogs	Macquarie Ice Rink	TBA
25 JUL	17:00	Adelaide Adrenaline	X–X	Melbourne Mustangs	O’Brien Icehouse	TBA
25 JUL	17:00	Sydney Bears	X–X	Newcastle Northstars	Hunter Ice Skating Stadium	TBA
25 JUL	17:30	Perth Thunder	X–X	CBR Brave	Phillip Ice Skating Centre	TBA
26 JUL	14:00	Adelaide Adrenaline	X–X	Melbourne Ice	O’Brien Icehouse	TBA
26 JUL	16:30	Perth Thunder	X–X	CBR Brave	Phillip Ice Skating Centre	TBA

=== August ===
August fixtures and results
Date	Time	Away	Score	Home	Location	Recap
1 AUG	16:30	Sydney Bears	X–X	Perth Thunder	Perth Ice Arena	TBA
1 AUG	16:30	Melbourne Ice	X–X	Adelaide Adrenaline	IceArena	TBA
1 AUG	17:00	CBR Brave	X–X	Melbourne Mustangs	O’Brien Icehouse	TBA
1 AUG	17:00	Newcastle Northstars	X–X	Sydney Ice Dogs	Macquarie Ice Rink	TBA
2 AUG	14:00	CBR Brave	X–X	Melbourne Mustangs	O’Brien Icehouse	TBA
2 AUG	16:30	Sydney Bears	X–X	Perth Thunder	Perth Ice Arena	TBA
2 AUG	16:30	Melbourne Ice	X–X	Adelaide Adrenaline	IceArena	TBA
8 AUG	17:00	Perth Thunder	X–X	Melbourne Mustangs	O’Brien Icehouse	TBA
8 AUG	17:00	Adelaide Adrenaline	X–X	Newcastle Northstars	Hunter Ice Skating Stadium	TBA
8 AUG	17:30	Sydney Bears	X–X	CBR Brave	Phillip Ice Skating Centre	TBA
9 AUG	14:00	Perth Thunder	X–X	Melbourne Ice	O’Brien Icehouse	TBA
9 AUG	17:00	Adelaide Adrenaline	X–X	Sydney Bears	Macquarie Ice Rink	TBA
15 AUG	17:00	Sydney Ice Dogs	X–X	Newcastle Northstars	Hunter Ice Skating Stadium	TBA
15 AUG	17:00	Melbourne Mustangs	X–X	Sydney Bears	Macquarie Ice Rink	TBA
15 AUG	17:30	Melbourne Ice	X–X	CBR Brave	Phillip Ice Skating Centre	TBA
16 AUG	16:00	Melbourne Mustangs	X–X	Newcastle Northstars	Hunter Ice Skating Stadium	TBA
16 AUG	17:00	Melbourne Ice	X–X	Sydney Ice Dogs	Macquarie Ice Rink	TBA
21 AUG	19:30	Newcastle Northstars	X–X	Sydney Bears	Macquarie Ice Rink	TBA
22 AUG	16:30	Sydney Ice Dogs	X–X	Perth Thunder	Perth Ice Arena	TBA
22 AUG	17:00	CBR Brave	X–X	Sydney Bears	Macquarie Ice Rink	TBA
22 AUG	17:00	Melbourne Ice	X–X	Melbourne Mustangs	O’Brien Icehouse	TBA
23 AUG	16:30	Sydney Ice Dogs	X–X	Adelaide Adrenaline	IceArena	TBA
23 AUG	16:30	Newcastle Northstars	X–X	CBR Brave	Phillip Ice Skating Centre	TBA

=== Standings ===
Pos	Team	Pld	W	OTW	OTL	L	GF	GA	GD	Pts	Qualification or relegation
1	Adelaide Adrenaline	0	0	0	0	0	0	0	0	0	2020 Goodall Cup Finals
2	CBR Brave	0	0	0	0	0	0	0	0	0	2020 Goodall Cup Finals
3	Melbourne Ice	0	0	0	0	0	0	0	0	0	2020 Goodall Cup Finals
4	Melbourne Mustangs	0	0	0	0	0	0	0	0	0	2020 Goodall Cup Finals
5	Newcastle Northstars	0	0	0	0	0	0	0	0	0	
6	Perth Thunder	0	0	0	0	0	0	0	0	0	
7	Sydney Bears	0	0	0	0	0	0	0	0	0	
8	Sydney Ice Dogs	0	0	0	0	0	0	0	0	0	

Updated to match(es) played on 13 February 2020. Source: AIHL Elite Prospects
Rules for classification:
Tie-break: 1) points; 2) goal difference; 3) number of goals scored
Points: 3 points for regulation win; 2 points for OT or SO win; 1 point for OT or SO loss; 0 points for regulation loss

=== Skater statistics ===
2020 AIHL season top-ten lists for the following four skater statistical categories: Points, Goals, Assists and Penalty minutes.

=== Goaltender statistics ===
2020 AIHL season top-ten lists for the following two goaltender statistical categories: Goals against average and Save percentage

== Goodall Cup playoffs ==
The 2020 finals weekend is scheduled to begin on 29 August with the Goodall Cup final held on 30 August. Following the end of the regular season the top four teams advance to the finals weekend, which is to be held at STADIUM in LOCATION. The series is a single game elimination with the two winning semi-finalists advancing to the Goodall Cup final. The winner of the final lifts the historic Goodall Cup.

Semi-finals
1
4
3
2

Final

All times are UTC+10:00

=== Semi-finals ===
29 August 2020; 15:00	v

29 August 2020; 19:00	v

=== Final ===
30 August 2020	v
