= Trans-Tasman Champions League =

- Current season, competition or edition: 2012 Trans-Tasman Champions League
- Sport: Ice hockey
- Founded: 2012
- No. of teams: 4
- Most recent champion: Melbourne Ice

The Trans-Tasman Champions League is an ice hockey tournament between the Australian Ice Hockey League and the New Zealand Ice Hockey League. Its formation was announced in August 2011 with the top two teams from each league from the previous season playing against the other league. The inaugural 2012 tournament took place in Melbourne, Victoria with the Melbourne Ice winning the tournament. The second tournament is set to be held in New Zealand, with the location and teams yet to be announced.

== History ==
The Trans-Tasman Champions League was first announced in August 2011 and is organised between the Australian Ice Hockey League (AIHL) and the New Zealand Ice Hockey League. The format of the tournament was originally announced to be a two-week tournament featuring the two best teams from each league, following the results of the previous season, playing in a round robin tournament. The winner being the team who finished on top of the table standings. It was later announced that the tournament format had been revised into a two-day tournament to be held in the first week of July. Teams from each league would only play games against the opposing league with the winner being the team who finished with the best record after all teams had played their two games. The tournament will also use rules set by the International Ice Hockey Federation as opposed to the AIHL's rules, which will see the period length increased from 15 minutes to 20. The 2012 Trans-Tasman Champions League was held at the Medibank Icehouse in Melbourne, Victoria, Australia on the 7 and 8 July 2012. The tournament included the Australian teams of the Melbourne Ice and Newcastle North Stars who finished the 2011 AIHL season as champions and runners-up respectively, and the New Zealand champions Botany Swarm and runners-up Southern Stampede. Melbourne Ice won the tournament on goal difference after winning both of their games against the New Zealand teams and finishing ahead of Newcastle on goal difference. The 2013 tournament was set to be held in New Zealand but was cancelled due to the Australian teams not being able to raise the funds in order to travel to New Zealand. Discussions are currently being undertaken to renew the tournament in 2016 and host it in New Zealand.

== Format ==
The Trans-Tasman Champions League trophy

The tournament takes place annually in the weekend of the first week of July, halfway through the regular season of both leagues. Both leagues send two teams which are the previous season's regular season champions and the winner of that season's finals of each league. In a situation where one team is both the regular season champion and winner of the finals of the previous season, the team that was the runner up of the previous grand final is selected instead to be the second seeded team of their respective league. One team of each league plays one game against the two teams of the other league. At no point do two teams for the same league play each other. Therefore, there is a total of four games each in the tournament, played across two days. The winning team is the team who finishes first in the round-robin standings. They either have the best record of the four teams, or in the case of a tie, the best goal difference in their two match ups.

== Host and Results ==
The first edition of the Trans-Tasman Champions League was in 2012, and was hosted at the Medibank Icehouse in Melbourne. The second edition is to be hosted in New Zealand in 2014, with a site that has yet to be determined. Should there be more additions afterward, it is expected that this pattern will be repeated with even years been hosted by an AIHL or Australian city and odd years by a NZIHL or New Zealand city.

Year	Location	Teams	Winner
2012	Medibank Icehouse, Melbourne, Victoria	Botany Swarm, Melbourne Ice, Newcastle Northstars, Southern Stampede	Melbourne Ice
2013	Queenstown Ice Arena, Queenstown, New Zealand	Canterbury Red Devils, Southern Stampede, Melbourne Ice, Newcastle Northstars	Cancelled
2016	TBD, New Zealand	Cancelled	

== See also ==
- Australian Ice Hockey League
- New Zealand Ice Hockey League
