= Australian Ice Hockey League =

Australia's top-level ice hockey league

- Current season, competition or edition: 2026 AIHL season
- Sport: Ice hockey
- Founded: 2000 (26 years ago)
- First season: 2000
- Director: Ivan Rapchuk (Brisbane Lightning), Jamie Taylor (Adelaide Adrenaline), Joyce Price (Melbourne Mustangs), Wayne Hellyer, Andy French
- General manager: Vacant
- Motto: Fastest team sport in Australia
- No. of teams: 10
- Country: Australia
- Headquarters: Canberra, ACT, Australia
- Confederation: IHA
- Most recent champions: Newcastle Northstars (7th title)
- Most titles: Newcastle Northstars (7 titles)
- Streaming partners: AIHL.TV (StayLive AB); Sportradar
- Website: theaihl.com

The Australian Ice Hockey League (AIHL) is Australia's top-level men's ice hockey league. Established in 2000, the AIHL is sanctioned by Ice Hockey Australia (a member of the International Ice Hockey Federation). The AIHL is a semi-professional league that is contested by ten franchised teams in two conferences spanning six Australian states and territories. AIHL premiers are awarded the H Newman Reid Trophy and AIHL champions are awarded the Goodall Cup, the world's third oldest ice hockey trophy, having been first awarded in 1909. The most successful team in AIHL history is the Newcastle Northstars, having claimed seven championship titles. The current champions, from 2026, are the Newcastle Northstars.

== History ==
=== Foundation and first decade (2000–10) ===
The Australian Ice Hockey League (AIHL) was formed in 2000 following the collapse of the former national league. In its first season, the AIHL comprised three teams – the Adelaide Avalanche, Canberra Knights, and the Sydney Bears. During the first two seasons the teams competed in round-robin weekends over the length of the season, with the two top teams playing a single final. Adelaide Avalanche finished first in both years after the regular season, with the Sydney Bears winning the Goodall Cup in the 2001 playoffs.

==== Expansion and Finals introduction ====
In 2002 the AIHL expanded to six teams with the inclusion of the Melbourne Ice, Newcastle North Stars and the West Sydney Ice Dogs. The Sydney Bears finished first in the regular season standings and won the Goodall Cup playoffs. At the start of the 2003 AIHL season it was announced that the finals playoff would be expanded to include the top four finishing teams after the regular season. Newcastle North Stars won their first regular season and their first Goodall Cup. The following season, in 2004, the West Sydney Ice Dogs won their first Goodall Cup after defeating the Newcastle North Stars in the final.

In 2005 the AIHL expanded to eight teams with the Central Coast Rhinos and the Brisbane Blue Tongues joining the league. During the 2005 season the Avalanche signed former National Hockey League (NHL) player Steve McKenna who played over 350 games in the NHL while the North Stars won their second Goodall Cup. In 2006 the Brisbane Blue Tongues signed Canadian Rob Zamuner who had played nearly 800 games in the NHL. The North Stars went on to win their second consecutive Goodall Cup title, defeating Adelaide for the second year in a row. The 2007 AIHL season opened with the Avalanche and the Blue Tongues announcing the signing of former NHL players Mel Angelstad and Tyrone Garner respectively. The Bears won the 2007 Goodall Cup, their first since 2002, after defeating the North Stars in the final.

==== Team collapse and withdrawals ====
Starting the 2008 season the Brisbane Blue Tongues announced their relocation to the Gold Coast to become the Gold Coast Blue Tongues as well as the signing of former Tampa Bay Lightning player Gaetan Royer. During the season the Adelaide Avalanche folded due to financial problems. Following the withdrawal of the Avalanche a new team was formed, the Adelaide Adrenaline. Newcastle North Stars went on to win the 2008 Goodall Cup, defeating West Sydney Ice Dogs in the final. In 2009 the Central Coast Rhinos left the league after refusing to accept the AIHL's new licensing model and went on to join the newly formed Australian International Ice Hockey Cup. 2009 also saw the Goodall Cup withdrawn from the AIHL by Ice Hockey Australia so it could return to being a state contested tournament. It was replaced by the H. Newman Reid Trophy which was won by the Adrenaline. The following season, 2010, Ice Hockey Australia returned the Goodall Cup to the AIHL with the H. Newman Reid Trophy being consigned to be the prize for the winner of the regular season. Melbourne Ice won their first Goodall Cup, defeating the Adrenaline in the final 6–4.

=== Second decade (2011–19) ===
In 2011, the league returned to an eight-team competition with the inclusion of the Melbourne-based Mustangs IHC. The AIHL also granted a ninth team, the Perth Thunder, a provisional licence to play exhibition games during the 2011 season, to seek a vote to join the league on a full licence in 2012. Melbourne Ice went back-to-back and won the H. Newman Reid Trophy and the Goodall Cup in 2011, defeating the Newcastle Northstars in the grand final. In August 2011, the AIHL and the New Zealand Ice Hockey League (NZIHL) jointly announced the formation of the Trans-Tasman Champions League. The Champions League would feature two teams from both leagues in a round-robin format. The tournament would commence in Australia in 2012 and hosting rights would alternate between Australia and New Zealand from that point forward. After Season 2011 finished, in November 2011, at the annual general meeting (AGM), the AIHL reached consensus and announced Perth Thunder had been successful in obtaining a full league licence and would enter the AIHL proper in 2012.

==== Implementation of conference system ====
For season 2012, with the addition of a ninth team, the AIHL implemented a conference system for the first time in the league's history. The decision was made to manage team costs and the season schedule length. The league signed a 3-year sponsorship contract with Skaters Network that included the naming rights of the two conferences. The conferences were subsequently named Bauer and Easton after ice hockey brands Bauer Hockey and Easton Hockey, two brands Skaters Network distribute. The conference restructure flowed into Finals format changes. The conference winners would draw the opposing conference's second-place finisher in the semi-finals, rather than the traditional 1v4 and 2v3. Winners of the semi's would advance to the Goodall Cup Final as normal. To further assist with team travel costs, the AIHL signed a one-year partnership agreement with Virgin Australia to become the league's preferred airline partner. The NSW and ACT based teams were grouped together in the Bauer Conference and the VIC, SA, WA and QLD teams were grouped together in the Easton Conference during the 2012 regular season.

Newcastle and Melbourne Ice finished top of the two conferences at the end of the 2012 regular season, with Newcastle claiming the Premiership title by a single point in the combined league table. Sydney Ice Dogs and Adelaide were runner's up, all qualifying for Finals. The two top teams won their semi-finals to advance to the grand final decider. Melbourne ice won the grand final 4–3, thanks to Lliam Webster who scored the winning goal, over the Northstars to claim the Goodall Cup for a third straight time, completing the first three-peat in AIHL history.

In July 2012, the inaugural Trans-Tasman Champions League took place at the Icehouse in Melbourne. AIHL teams, Melbourne Ice and Newcastle North Stars, were joined by NZIHL teams, Botany Swarm and Southern Stampede for the round-robin tournament. The Melbourne Ice finished first in the standings and claimed the maiden Champions League title and trophy, beating Newcastle to the title on goal difference.

==== Robert Bannerman era ====
Ahead of the 2013 season, In February 2013, the league appointed Robert Bannerman as the new AIHL Commissioner. Bannerman was charged with improving the AIHL's revenue growth, fan development and attendance. The AIHL signed its first broadcast deal with Australian-based pay-television service Fox Sports. The deal would see one game a week broadcast during the regular season on Foxtel's Fox Sports channels. The League also shrunk back to eight teams with the suspension announcement of Gold Coast Blue Tongues' AIHL licence to due the team's inability to secure a home venue agreement with a suitable rink. During the 2013 AIHL season, the Sydney Ice Dogs secured the Premiership-Championship double by finishing top of the regular season standings and winning the grand final. It was the first time the Ice Dogs had won either the H Newman Reid Trophy or Goodall Cup since 2004.

2014 saw the league experience further change. In February 2014, AIHL founding team, Canberra Knights, folded operations after 33 years with owner, John Raut, citing financial costs, lack of local player talent and sustained poor performances as the reasons for the decision. A Canberra player and community led consortium was established to keep an AIHL licence in Canberra following the Knight's collapse. After meeting AIHL licence demands in April, the consortium was successful in obtaining the Canberra licence and a new team was formed, named CBR Brave. Season 2014 produced a new Goodall Cup and Premiership winner, with the Melbourne Mustangs claiming their first league and Finals titles, defeating the Melbourne Ice in the grand final.

After the 2014 season, the AIHL made important decisions at their AGM in December 2014 to reject, for undisclosed reasons, the Central Coast Rhinos application to re-join the league and allow the Gold Coast Blue Tongues' licence to expire, after two years of suspension with the team unable to secure financing to build a proposed new rink or relocate to an appropriate alternative facility. Thus confirming the AIHL would kick off 2015 with the same eight teams from 2014.

Between 2015 and 2018, the league experienced game rule changes, exhibition matches in Queensland, the loss of the premier Sydney ice rink and team relocations. In 2015, the Sydney Ice Arena was approved for redevelopment into apartments by the owner, forcing the Sydney Bears to relocate to Penrith. The League adopted the international recognised hybrid icing rule to assist AIHL players in preparation for IIHF competition while continuing to protect players from the risks of potentially damaging collisions. In 2016, the Bears took two regular season games to Brisbane to showcase the league in Queensland for the first time since 2012. Games were held at both Iceworld Boondall and Iceworld Acacia Ridge against the Melbourne Ice. In 2017, following the completion of renovations, the Sydney Bears and Sydney Ice Dogs relocated from Penrith and Liverpool to Macquarie Ice Rink. In 2018, AIHL Commissioner, Rob Bannerman, stepped down after six years in the role. Bannerman would be relocating to the United States to pursue a career change.

==== David Turik era ====
In 2019, AIHL head of finance, Heidi Wilson, resigned from her role in the league commission. Dawn Watt was elected Deputy Commissioner and the AIHL canvassed for new members. David Turik was subsequently appointed the new AIHL Commissioner.

=== COVID-19 season cancellations (2020–21) ===
During 2020 and 2021, the league suspended operations due to the outbreak of COVID-19. Different health measures and border restrictions domestically and internationally made it unviable to run seasons in 2020 and 2021. Originally in 2020 the league was suspended but it was later cancelled. In 2021, exhibition series were run instead of the league, but they were interrupted due to the ongoing outbreak. In 2021, AIHL Commissioner, David Turik, resigned from the role by "mutual agreement", no reasons for his departure were disclosed.

=== Third decade (2022–present) ===
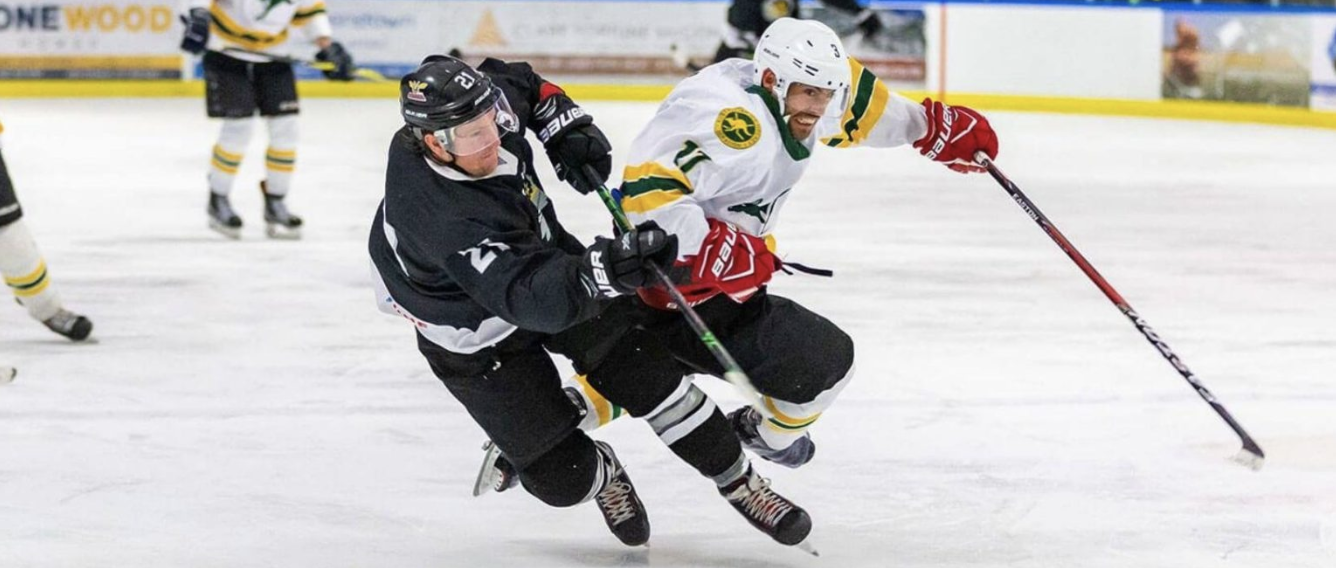

In 2022, the AIHL announced it would be returning to a regular season for the first time since 2019. The league released information of a new board of directors and executive team as well as the adoption of a new finals format and increase to game lengths. The AIHL would implement the international standard 60-minute games (up from 50 minutes) and expanded the finals weekend to include a preliminary final and an additional day in the schedule. The League also announced a new license holder for the Adelaide Adrenaline franchise, headed by Benny Gebert and Glen Foll. A new domestic broadcasting deal was struck with Kayo Sports that will increase the amount of AIHL content broadcast within Australia. Internationally, the league signed a three-year contract with Swiss-based multi-national Sportradar to distribute AIHL broadcasting in North America and Europe. Preparations for the 2022 season were disrupted by the withdrawals of the Perth Thunder and Adelaide Adrenaline due to continued state border restrictions and disagreements with rink management respectively. However, in February 2022, the AIHL announced the expansion of the league would take place in 2023 and followed this up with the granting of licenses to the Brisbane Lightning, headed by Ice Hockey Queensland (IHQ), and the Central Coast Rhinos, who will be returning to the league for the first time in fourteen years after originally leaving at the conclusion of the 2008 season.

Due to extended renovation works at Macquarie Ice Rink, the two Sydney teams, the Bears and the Ice Dogs were forced to withdraw from the 2025 AIHL season. Both did return for the 2026 season.

== Teams ==
=== Current teams ===
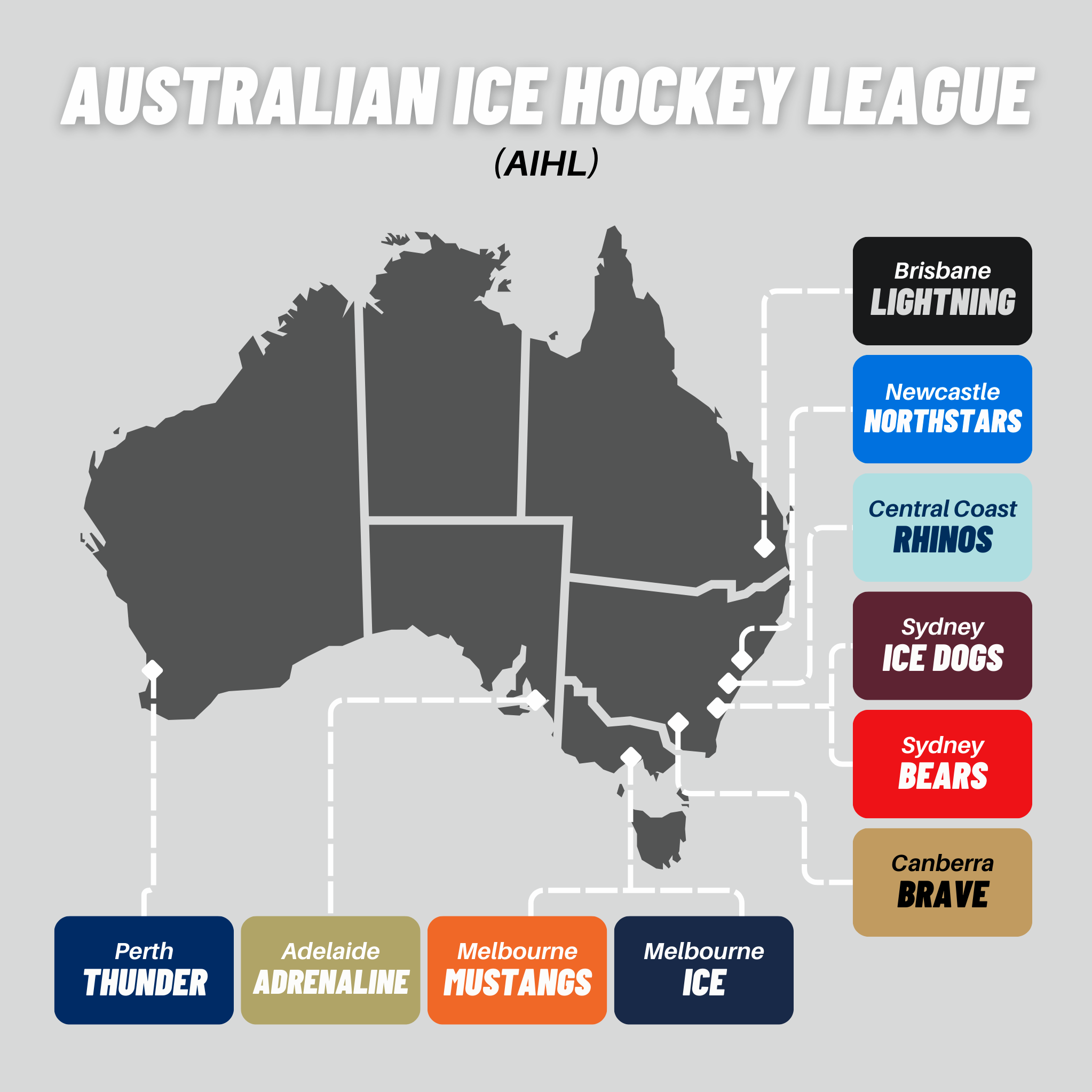
Current active AIHL teams and locations as of 2024.

Australian Ice Hockey League
Team	Colours	City	State	Arena	Capacity	Founded	Joined	Former names	Notes
Adelaide Adrenaline		Adelaide	(South Australia)	Adelaide Ice Arena	900	2008		Adelaide A's (2008)	Replaced Adelaide Avalanche in the league
Brisbane Lightning		Brisbane	(Queensland)	Boondall Iceworld	450	2022	2023		Joint venture between IHQ, Brisbane Buccaneers and the Southern Stars
Canberra Brave		Canberra	(Australian Capital Territory)	AIS Arena	3,000	2014		CBR Brave (2014–23)	Replaced Canberra Knights in the league
Central Coast Rhinos		Central Coast	(New South Wales)	Erina Ice Arena	500	2005	2023	Blue Haven Rhinos (2005–06)	Second spell in league, first spell between 2005 and 2008 before declining licence in 2009
Melbourne Ice		Melbourne	(Victoria (state))	O'Brien Icehouse	1,600	2000	2002		2002 expansion team
Melbourne Mustangs		Melbourne	(Victoria (state))	O'Brien Icehouse	1,600	2010	2011	Mustangs IHC (2010–12)	2011 expansion team
Newcastle Northstars		Newcastle	(New South Wales)	Hunter Ice Skating Stadium	1,000	1981	2002	Newcastle North Stars (2002–16)	2002 expansion team
Perth Thunder		Perth	(Western Australia)	Perth Ice Arena	600	2010	2012		2012 expansion team
Sydney Bears		Sydney	(New South Wales)	Macquarie Ice Rink	1,400	1982	2000	AIHL Bears (2007–09)	Last remaining operational founding team. Underwent a renovation in 2025.
Sydney Ice Dogs		Sydney	(New South Wales)	Macquarie Ice Rink	1,400	2002		West Sydney Ice Dogs (2002–09)	2002 expansion team. Underwent a renovation in 2025.

=== Former teams ===
Former teams
Team	Colours	City	State	Joined	Left	Former names	Notes
Adelaide Avalanche		Adelaide	(South Australia)	2000	2008		Founding team. Suspended operations in June 2008, players reformed to play as the Adelaide A's for the remainder of the 2008 season
Canberra Knights		Canberra	(Australian Capital Territory)	2000	2013		Founding team. Suspended operation in February 2014, players later reformed to play as the CBR Brave
Gold Coast Blue Tongues		Gold Coast	(Queensland)	2005	2012	Brisbane Blue Tongues	Licence suspended in 2012 before expiring in 2014 due to not having an adequate home rink.

== Season structure ==
=== Regular season ===
The AIHL season commences mid April and runs through to the last weekend of August or the first weekend of September. Games are played on Friday, Saturday, and Sunday, typically starting between 2.00 pm and 5.00 pm depending on the venue.

Teams nominally play each of their seven opponents in the league four times for a total of 28 regular season games. In seasons prior to 2011, some games were played for double-points (and counted as two games) to keep travel costs down.

=== Match length ===
The length of matches has changed throughout the history of the AIHL. From inception in 2000 to 2012 matches were forty-five minutes long. From 2013 to 2019 the AIHL increased the match length to fifty minutes, consisting of two fifteen minute periods followed by a twenty-minute third period. On 11 February 2020, the AIHL announced the league would be adopting the international standard sixty minutes match length. The change increased the league's matches by ten minutes and standardised the period lengths to twenty minutes each. The change was scheduled to come into effect for the 2020 season until the season was cancelled. It was finally introduced in the 2022 season.

=== Overtime and points system ===
The points system and overtime formats used by the AIHL has developed and changed over the history of the league.

The current points system, first introduced in 2006, follows similar systems widely used in Europe. 3 points is awarded for a win, and 0 points for a loss. If a match is tied at the end of regulation time, overtime (OT) is used to guarantee a match winner. An overtime win is worth 2 points and an overtime loss is worth 1 point.

The current overtime rules deployed in the AIHL for regular season matches was introduced in 2019. At the end of regulation time there is a five-minute three on three overtime period, with the first goal winning the game. If no one scores during this OT period the match is then sent to a shootout to decide the winner and points split.

Between 2000 and 2005, the league had a then NHL style four on four five minute overtime period. If no one scored, the match was then officially recorded as a tie. In 2006 the league removed the five minute overtime period and replaced it with a shootout, meaning every match would have a winner. The shootout only system was used by the league until the end of the 2018 season.

For AIHL finals (play-offs), overtime periods are played to a regulation period length and incorporate the golden goal rule – in an overtime period, the game ends when one team scores a goal; the teams are at full strength (five skaters, barring penalties), there is no shootout, and each overtime period is 20 minutes with full intermissions between overtime periods.

=== Playoffs ===
Between 2000 and 2002 the AIHL had a single match final, known as the championship final, between the two teams who finished first and second in the regular round-robin season. In 2002, the Goodall Cup was awarded to the winner of the championship final for the first time, previously it was used as the award for the annual inter-state tournament held by IHA. In 2003, the AIHL switched to a four team playoff system, expanding the format into a 'finals weekend'. Retaining the single-match series, two semi-finals and a final would be played at a single venue over one weekend. The top four teams from the regular season qualify for the finals weekend. The two semi finals are conducted on the Saturday with 1 v 4 (semi final 1) playing first followed by 2 v 3 (semi final 2). The winners of the two semi finals advance to the final, held on the Sunday, to compete for the Goodall Cup and the AIHL Championship.

In 2022, the league expanded the finals format by adding a preliminary final and a third day to the schedule. Semi-finals are played on Friday night. The top two teams from the AIHL regular season play-off in the major semi-final for an automatic spot in the Sunday afternoon Goodall Cup final. The teams who finished third and fourth in the regular season play-off in an elimination game in the minor semi-final. The winner of the minor semi-final advances to the preliminary final to play the loser of the major semi-final. The winner of the Saturday afternoon preliminary final progresses to the Goodall Cup final and the loser is eliminated. The winner of the grand final is named AIHL Champion and lifts the historic Goodall Cup.

As of 2023, finals have been held in three different Australian states including New South Wales, South Australia and Victoria, six cities including, Sydney, Adelaide, Central Coast, Newcastle, Penrith and Melbourne and eight stadiums as detailed in the table below:

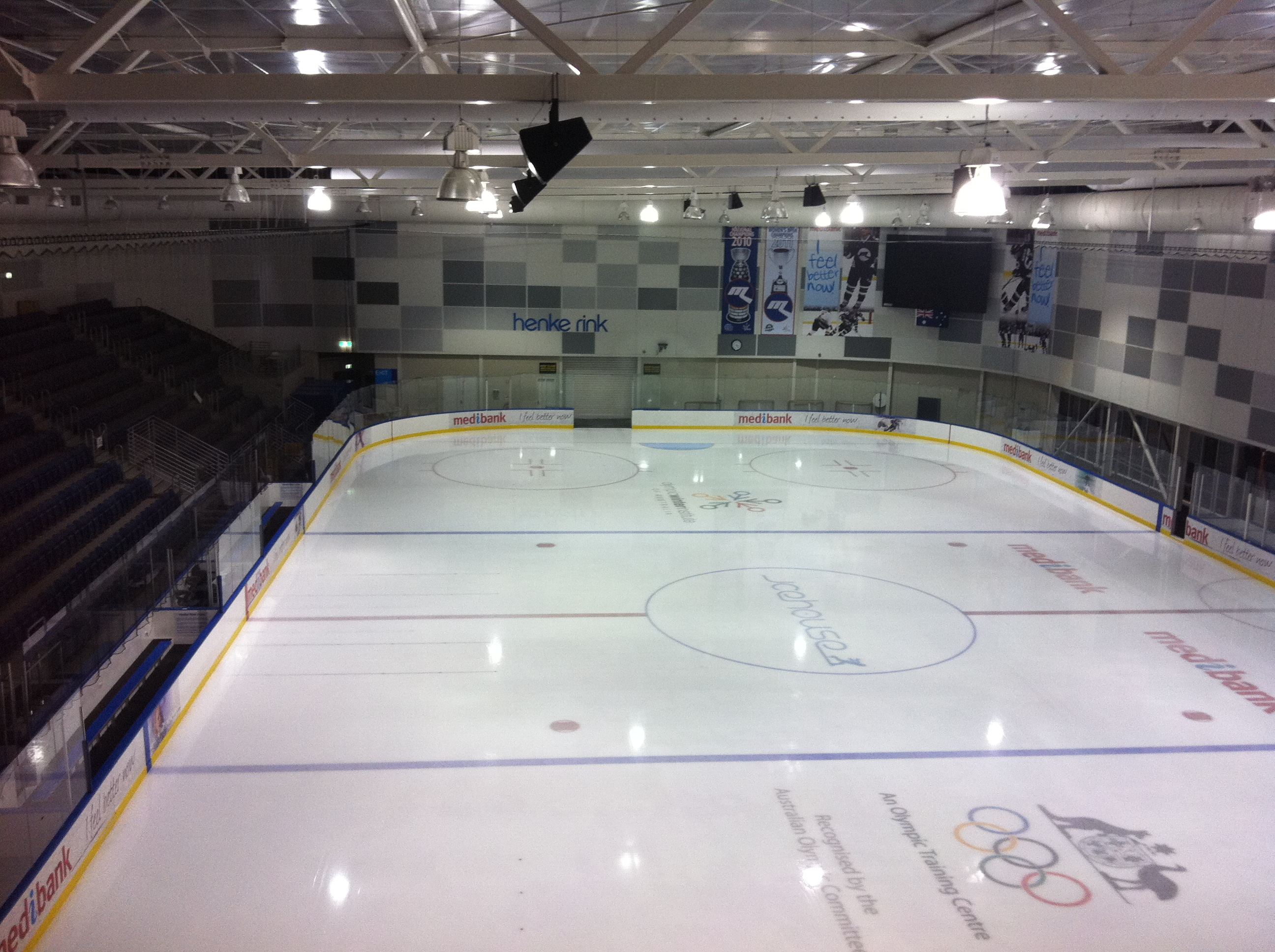
The Henke Rink at the O'Brien Icehouse has hosted a record thirteen AIHL Finals weekends

Finals Locations
Season	State	Location	Stadium
2000	NSW	Sydney	Macquarie Ice Rink
2001	SA	Adelaide	Thebarton Snowdome
2002	NSW	Sydney	Blacktown Ice Arena
2003	NSW	Sydney	Glaciarium
2004	NSW	Central Coast	Erina Ice World
2005	NSW	Newcastle	Hunter Ice Skating Stadium
2006	SA	Adelaide	Adelaide Ice ArenA
2007	NSW	Penrith	Penrith Ice Palace
2008	NSW	Newcastle	Hunter Ice Skating Stadium
2009	NSW	Newcastle	Hunter Ice Skating Stadium
2010	VIC	Melbourne	Medibank Icehouse
2011	VIC	Melbourne	Medibank Icehouse
2012	NSW	Newcastle	Hunter Ice Skating Stadium
2013	VIC	Melbourne	Medibank Icehouse
2014	VIC	Melbourne	Medibank Icehouse
2015	VIC	Melbourne	Medibank Icehouse
2016	VIC	Melbourne	O'Brien Group Arena
2017	VIC	Melbourne	O'Brien Group Arena
2018	VIC	Melbourne	O'Brien Group Arena
2019	NSW	Newcastle	Hunter Ice Skating Stadium
2022	VIC	Melbourne	O'Brien Icehouse
2023	VIC	Melbourne	O'Brien Icehouse
2024	VIC	Melbourne	O'Brien Icehouse
2025	VIC	Melbourne	O'Brien Icehouse
2026	VIC	Melbourne	O'Brien Icehouse

== League champions ==
=== AIHL champions by seasons (2000–present) ===
Season-by-season Championships and Premierships
Year	AIHL Championships			AIHL League	
Year	Champions	Score	Finalists	Premiers	Runners-up
2000	Adelaide Avalanche	6–5 (SO)	Sydney Bears	Sydney Bears	Adelaide Avalanche
2001	Adelaide Avalanche	10–7	Sydney Bears	Adelaide Avalanche	Sydney Bears
2002	Sydney Bears	5–4 (SO)	Adelaide Avalanche	Sydney Bears	Adelaide Avalanche
2003	Newcastle North Stars	4–1	Western Sydney Ice Dogs	Adelaide Avalanche	Newcastle North Stars
2004	Western Sydney Ice Dogs	3–1	Newcastle North Stars	Newcastle North Stars	Western Sydney Ice Dogs
2005	Newcastle North Stars	3–1	Adelaide Avalanche	Adelaide Avalanche	Newcastle North Stars
2006	Newcastle North Stars	4–0	Adelaide Avalanche	Melbourne Ice	Adelaide Avalanche
2007	AIHL Bears	4–3 (OT)	Newcastle North Stars	Adelaide Avalanche	Melbourne Ice
2008	Newcastle North Stars	4–1	Sydney Ice Dogs	AIHL Bears	Sydney Ice Dogs
2009	Adelaide Adrenaline	3–2 (OT)	Newcastle North Stars	Newcastle North Stars	Melbourne Ice
2010	Melbourne Ice	6–4	Adelaide Adrenaline	Newcastle North Stars	Melbourne Ice
2011	Melbourne Ice	3–2	Newcastle North Stars	Melbourne Ice	Newcastle North Stars
2012	Melbourne Ice	4–3	Newcastle North Stars	Newcastle North Stars	Melbourne Ice
2013	Sydney Ice Dogs	6–3	Newcastle North Stars	Sydney Ice Dogs	Newcastle North Stars
2014	Melbourne Mustangs	6–1	Melbourne Ice	Melbourne Mustangs	Melbourne Ice
2015	Newcastle North Stars	3–2 (OT)	Melbourne Ice	Newcastle North Stars	Melbourne Ice
2016	Newcastle North Stars	2–1	CBR Brave	Melbourne Ice	Perth Thunder
2017	Melbourne Ice	4–1	CBR Brave	Melbourne Ice	Perth Thunder
2018	CBR Brave	4–3 (OT)	Sydney Bears	CBR Brave	Sydney Bears
2019	Sydney Bears	5–2	Perth Thunder	CBR Brave	Newcastle Northstars
2020–21 Seasons cancelled due to COVID-19 pandemic
2022	CBR Brave	3–2	Newcastle Northstars	CBR Brave	Newcastle Northstars
2023	Melbourne Mustangs	1–0	CBR Brave	CBR Brave	Sydney Bears
2024	Canberra Brave	5–0	Melbourne Ice	Sydney Bears	Melbourne Ice
2025	Melbourne Ice	7-3	Canberra Brave	Melbourne Ice	Canberra Brave
2026	Newcastle North Stars	2-1	Canberra Brave	Newcastle North Stars	Melbourne Mustangs

=== AIHL champions all-time record ===
All-time Championships
Team	# Titles	Years
Adelaide Adrenaline	1	2009
Adelaide Avalanche	2	2000, 2001
Canberra Brave	3	2018, 2022, 2024
Melbourne Ice	5	2010, 2011, 2012, 2017, 2025
Melbourne Mustangs	2	2014, 2023
Newcastle Northstars	7	2003, 2005, 2006, 2008, 2015, 2016, 2026
Sydney Bears	3	2002, 2007, 2019
Sydney Ice Dogs	2	2004, 2013

== Trophies and awards ==
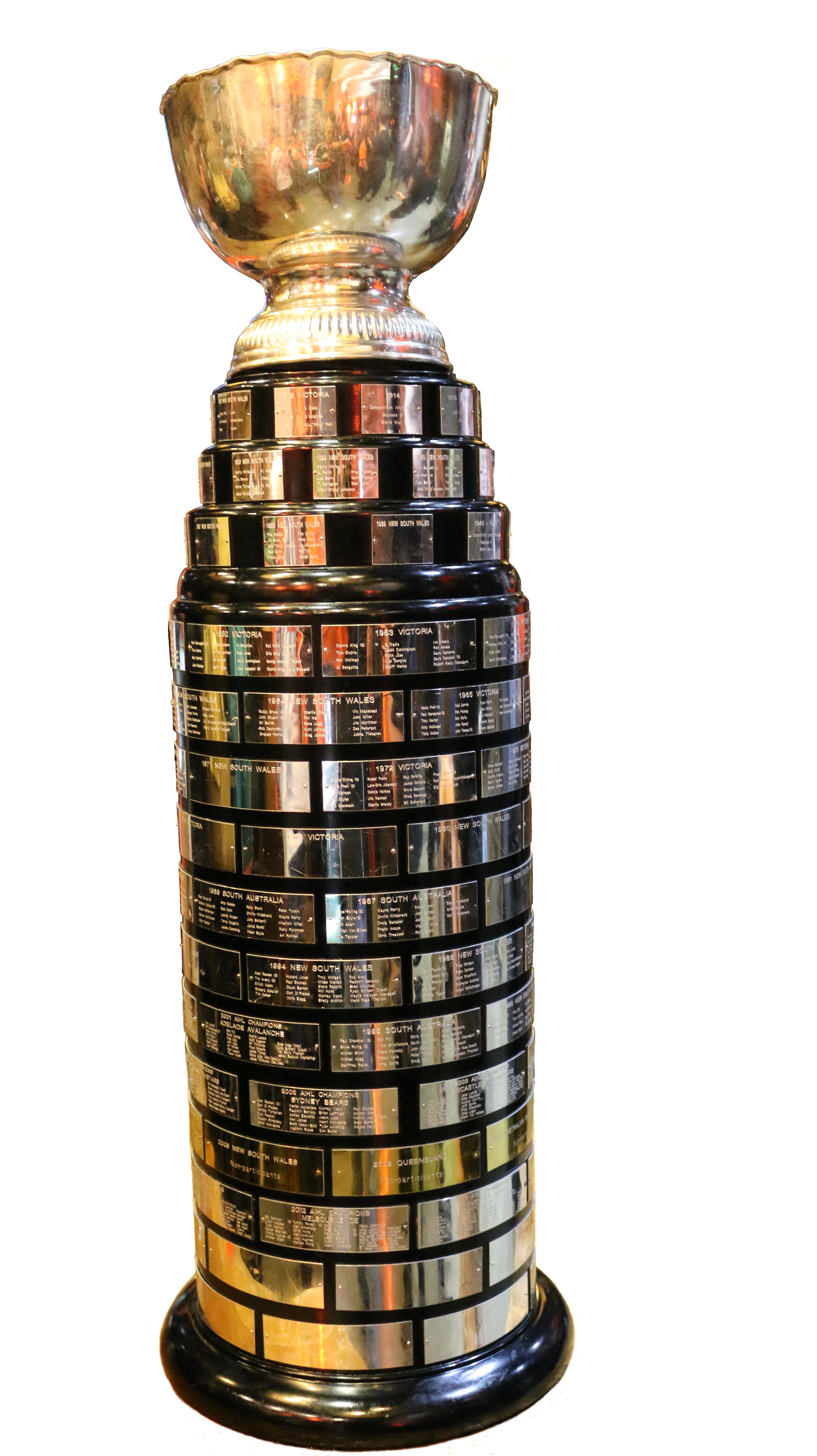
The Goodall Cup is awarded to the AIHL Champion

Goodall Cup

The champions of the AIHL are awarded the Goodall Cup, a perpetual national trophy third in age only to the Stanley Cup (1892) and the Allan Cup (1908). The Goodall Cup was incorporated into the AIHL in 2002 after the league expanded to 6 teams. The Goodall Cup is awarded to the team that wins the Finals series/playoffs weekend at the end of each season. The team that holds the Goodall Cup is considered to be the Australian champion.

The Goodall Cup was withdrawn from the AIHL in 2009 by the cup's custodians, Ice Hockey Australia. The Goodall Cup was instead awarded to South Australia in a traditional state vs state tournament held in Adelaide, South Australia in October 2009 as a 100-year celebration of the Goodall Cup.

In 2010 the Goodall Cup was offered back to the AIHL, and the cup accepted by a vote of the members and board. The Goodall Cup has been re-instated by the AIHL as its finals tournament trophy and as the prize signifying Australian champions of ice hockey.

Like in the case of the Stanley Cup, the original Goodall Cup is considered too delicate to travel and a replica is now awarded to the league champion team.

Mick McCormack Cup

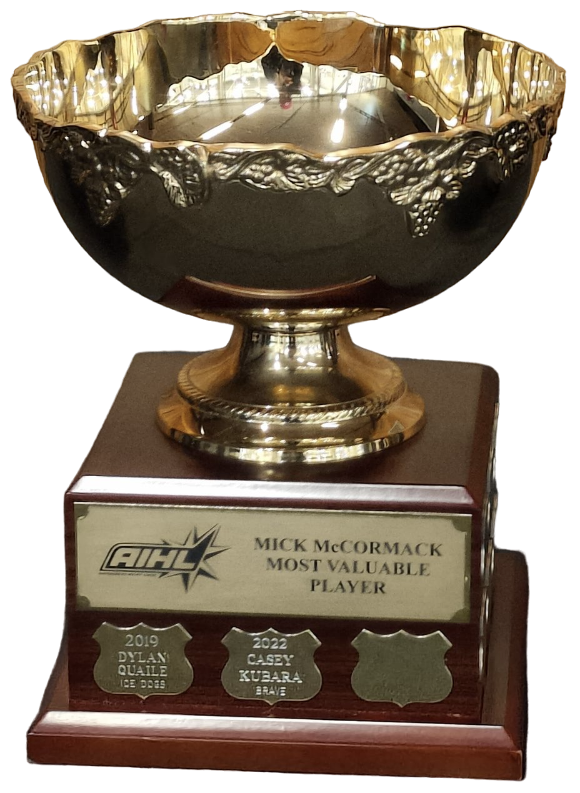
Mick McCormack Cup is awarded to the MVP of the AIHL regular season

First awarded in 2015, the Mick McCormack Cup is awarded annually to the most valuable player of the Australian Ice Hockey League All-Star Game. As of 2018, the Cup was re-purposed as the award to the winning team of the Australian Ice Hockey League All-Star Game.

The trophy is named after Australian ice hockey advocate, Mick McCormack, who is the CEO of APA Group.

Recipients of the Mick McCormack Cup include Pat O’Kane from the Melbourne Mustangs (2015), Michael Dorr of Perth Thunder (2016), and Dominic Jalbert of CBR Brave (2017). Team Rezek won the cup in 2018.

AIHL Champions Trophy

In 2009 Ice Hockey Australia withdrew the Goodall Cup from the AIHL, claiming it was instead to presented to the winning team from IHA's own tournament to be run in South Australia, celebrating the Cup's 100th anniversary since it was first awarded in a game between NSW and Victoria in 1909. Without a major trophy to present to its finals winning team, the AIHL designed and had manufactured its own unique trophy.

The new AIHL Champions Trophy was awarded to the 2009 AIHL Champions, the Adelaide Adrenaline following their victory in the 2009 final.

In 2010 the AIHL Champions Trophy was re-launched as the H Newman Reid Trophy, honouring the minor premiers from each season back to 2008.

H Newman Reid Trophy

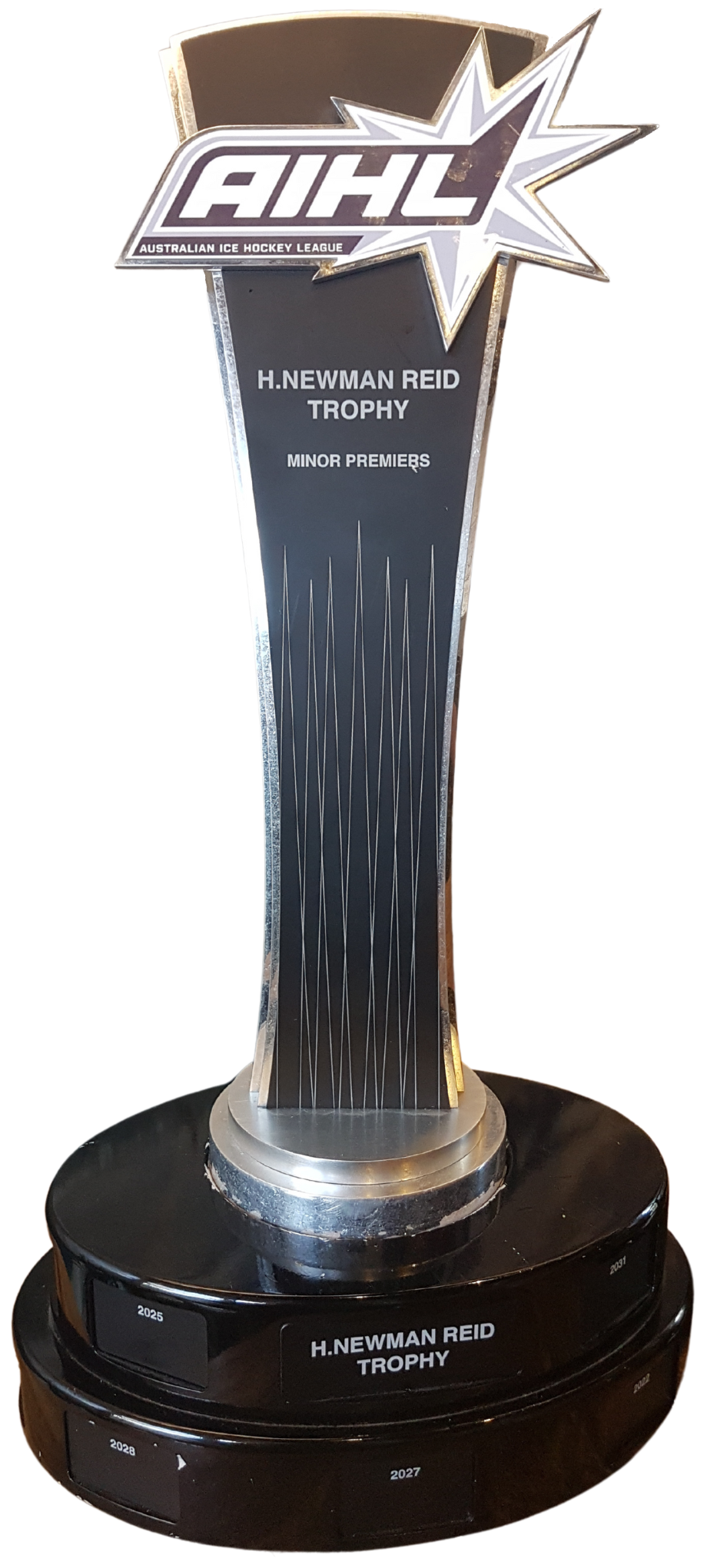
The H Newman Reid Trophy is awarded to the AIHL Premier

The H Newman Reid Trophy is awarded to the regular season's minor premiers; that is, the team that finishes first overall in the standings. Reid is considered the father of ice hockey in Australia, opening Australia's first two ice rinks and employing key people who introduced Australians, including his own children, to winter sports.

The H Newman Reid Trophy was first awarded in 2010 to the Newcastle North Stars after they finished first in the regular season with 54 points.

The Reid Trophy was backdated to 2008 including minor premiers the Sydney Bears (2008) and the Newcastle North Stars (2009 & 2010).

V.I.P. Cup

The V.I.P. Cup was awarded to the minor premiers of each season; that is, the team that finishes first overall in the standings at the end of the regular season. The VIP cup was last awarded to the Adelaide Avalanche in 2007. The VIP Cup was not returned to the league and has been replaced by the H Newman Reid Trophy.

Wilson Cup

The Wilson Cup is awarded to the winner of the AIHL pre-season competition, which began in 2007 and ran again in 2008 and 2009. No Wilson Cup was run in 2010 or 2011.

== Records ==
=== All-time skater totals ===
As of 2026 AIHL season

Top-ten skater totals in six categories. For PPG, to qualify for the list, a player must have played a minimum 20 games in the AIHL.

Appearances
No.	Name	Pos	GP
1	(Australia) Lliam Webster	D	407
2	(Australia) Tommy Powell	F	384
3	(Australia) Greg Oddy	F	383
4	(Australia) David Dunwoodie	D	372
5	(Australia) Sean Jones	F	366
6	(Australia) Brian Funes	D	351
7	(Australia) Adrian Esposito	F	341
8	(Australia) Tomas Manco	D	332
9	(Australia) Kai Miettinen	F	329
10	(Australia) Mark Rummukainen	D	325

Goals
No.	Name	Pos	G
1	(Australia) Greg Oddy	F	268
2	(Australia) Wehebe Darge	F	236
3	(Australia) Joey Hughes	F	230
4	(Australia) Lliam Webster	D	214
5	(Australia) Jamie Bourke	F	188
6	(Czech Republic) Vladimir Rubes	F	176
7	(Australia) Tommy Powell	F	175
8	(Czech Republic) Tomas Landa	F	173
9	(Canada) Matt Armstrong	F	170
10	(Canada) Jason Baclig	F	148

Assists
No.	Name	Pos	A
1	(Australia) Greg Oddy	F	347
2	(Australia) Wehebe Darge	F	304
3	(Australia) Tommy Powell	F	301
4	(Australia) Joey Hughes	F	291
5	(Australia) Lliam Webster	D	272
6	(Czech Republic) Vladimir Rubes	F	270
7	(Czech Republic) Tomas Landa	F	265
8	(Canada) Matt Armstrong	F	249
9	(Canada) Robert Starke	D	242
10	(United States) Robert Malloy	F	239

Points
No.	Name	Pos	P
1	(Australia) Greg Oddy	F	615
2	(Australia) Wehebe Darge	F	540
3	(Australia) Joey Hughes	F	521
4	(Australia) Lliam Webster	D	486
5	(Australia) Tommy Powell	F	476
6	(Czech Republic) Vladimir Rubes	F	446
7	(Czech Republic) Tomas Landa	F	438
8	(Australia) Jamie Bourke	F	422
9	(Canada) Matt Armstrong	F	419
10	(Australia) Casey Kubara	F	357

Points per game
No.	Name	Pos	PPG
1	David Booth-	F	3.960
2	(United States) Austin Albrecht	F	3.600
3	(Netherlands) Brad Smulders	F	3.45
4	(Canada) Jesse Gabrielle	F	3.35
5	(Canada) Grant Hebert	F	3.32
6	(Canada) Marcel Kars	F	3.30
7	(Russia) Evgenii Skachov	F	3.22
8	(Canada) B.J. Pelkey	F	3.100
9	(United States) Luke Moffatt	F	3.100
10	(United States) Addison DeBoer	F	3.04

Penalty minutes
No.	Name	Pos	PIM
1	(Australia) David Dunwoodie	D	1652
2	(Australia) Andrew White	D	1248
3	(Australia) Lliam Webster	D	1149
4	(Australia) Jamie Bourke	F	1137
5	(Australia) Joey Hughes	F	1020
6	(Australia) Greg Oddy	F	938
7	(Australia) Vincent Hughes	D	844
8	(Australia) Mark Rummukainen	D	826
9	(Australia) Cass Delsar	F	746
10	(Australia) Todd Stephenson	F	703

Legend:

Active AIHL player

=== By season totals ===
As of 2026 AIHL season

Top-ten season totals for skaters and goaltender in four categories. For goaltenders, to qualify for lists, a player must have played a minimum 10 AIHL matches in a season.

Points
No.	Name	Season	Pos	P
1	(Canada) Geordie Wudrick	2015	F	91
2	(United States) Addison DeBoer	2011	F	85
3	(Russia) Evgenii Skachov	2026	F	84
4	(Finland) Santeri Haarala	2026	F	84
5	(Canada) Tanner Hopps	2026	F	83
6	(Canada) Scott Timmins	2010	F	82
7	(United States) Brian Bales	2025	F	81
8	(Canada) Tanner Hopps	2015	F	80
9	(Canada) Stephen Blunden	2010	F	79
10	(United States) Peter Cartwright	2019	F	78

Penalty minutes
No.	Name	Season	Pos	PIM
1	(Australia) Blair Collins	2006	F	208
2	(Canada) Ryan O'Keefe	2006	D	192
3	(Canada) Bryan Lachance	2008	D	191
4	(Canada) Trevor Ross	2005	D	189
5	(Australia) Jamie Bourke	2011	F	180
6	(Canada) Derek Campbell	2010	F	175
7	(Canada) Jordan Landry	2005	F	172
8	(Australia) Blair Collins	2005	F	168
9	(Canada) Mike Funk	2005	D	168
10	(Australia) Harrison Byers	2013	D	167

Save percentage
No.	Name	Season	Pos	SV%
1	(Australia) Anthony Kimlin	2012	G	.930%
2	(Canada) Thomas Heemskerk	2016	G	.927%
3	(Canada) Matt Hewitt	2018	G	.925%
4	(Canada) Peter Di Salvo	2017	G	.924%
5	(Canada) Damien Ketlo	2017	G	.923%
6	(Australia) Anthony Kimlin	2023	G	.921%
7	(United States) Josh Unice	2015	G	.921%
8	(Australia) Anthony Kimlin	2018	G	.920%
9	(Japan) Tatsunoshin Ishida	2024	G	.920%
10	(Australia) Matthew Ezzy	2004	G	.919%

Goals against average
No.	Name	Season	Pos	GAA
1	(Canada) Matt Hewitt	2018	G	1.95
2	(United States) Troy Davenport	2016	G	2.08
3	(Canada) Matt Climie	2019	G	2.14
4	(New Zealand) Jaden Pine-Murphy	2014	G	2.23
5	(Australia) Anthony Kimlin	2012	G	2.25
6	(Australia) Matthew Ezzy	2004	G	2.28
7	(Canada) Dayne Davis	2017	G	2.33
8	(Australia) Anthony Kimlin	2018	G	2.39
9	(Australia) Olivier Martin	2013	G	2.45
10	(Canada) Thomas Heemskerk	2016	G	2.45

Legend:

Active AIHL player

== Season awards ==
AIHL season awards are announced near or at the end of the regular season, with the Finals MVP announced after the conclusion of the Goodall Cup Final. Below is the known history of AIHL award winners.

Season	MVP	Finals MVP	Goaltender	Defence	Rookie	Local	Coach
2000	–	–	–	–	–	–	–
2001	–	–	(Australia) Eric Lien	–	–	–	–
2002	–	–	–	–	–	–	–
2003	(Canada) Dylan Martini	–	–	–	–	–	–
2004	–	–	(Australia) Matthew Ezzy	–	–	–	–
2005	–	–	(Australia) Matthew Ezzy	–	–	–	–
2006	–	–	(Australia) Matthew Ezzy	–	–	–	–
2007	(Australia) Tommy Powell	(Finland) Pekka Kankaanranta	–	–	–	–	–
2008	(Australia) Lliam Webster	(Australia) Mickey Gilchrist	(Australia) Matthew Ezzy	–	–	–	–
2009	(Netherlands) Brad Smulders	(Australia) Cass Delsar	–	–	–	–	–
2010	(Australia) Greg Oddy	(Canada) Jason Baclig	–	–	–	–	–
2011	(Canada) Jason Baclig	(Australia) Joey Hughes	–	–	–	–	–
2012	(Czech Republic) Tomas Landa (Canada) Jeremy Boyer	(Australia) Todd Graham	(Australia) Anthony Kimlin	(Canada) Robbie Lawrance	(Australia) Greg Bay (New Zealand) Charlie Huber	–	–
2013	(Canada) Jeff Martens	(Australia) Anthony Kimlin	(Australia) Anthony Kimlin	(Canada) John Gordon	(Australia) Cameron Todd	(Australia) Anthony Kimlin	–
2014	(Canada) Simon Barg	(Sweden) Viktor Gibbs Sjödin	(Finland) Petri Pitkänen	(United States) Jack Wolgemuth	(Australia) Jeremy Brown	(Australia) David Dunwoodie	–
2015	(Canada) Geordie Wudrick	(Canada) Geordie Wudrick	(Czech Republic) Kamil Jarina	(Czech Republic) Jan Safar	(Australia) Kieran Webster	(Australia) Wehebe Darge	(Australia) Dave Kenway
2016	(Australia) Wehebe Darge	(Canada) Dayne Davis	(Australia) Anthony Kimlin	(Czech Republic) Jan Safar	(Australia) Casey Kubara	(Australia) Casey Kubara	(Australia) Brent Laver
2017	(Canada) Cameron Critchlow	(Sweden) Sebastian Ottosson	(Canada) Damien Ketlo	(Australia) Rob Haselhurst	(Australia) Bayley Kubara	(Australia) Joey Hughes	(Australia) Dave Ruck
2018	(Canada) Pier-Olivier Grandmaison	(United States) Trevor Gerling	(Australia) Anthony Kimlin	(Canada) Landon Oslanski	(Australia) Jason McMahon	(Australia) Wehebe Darge	(Australia) Ron Kuprowsky
2019	(Canada) Dylan Quaile	(Canada) Danick Gauthier	(Canada) Matt Climie	(Canada) Dylan Quaile	(Australia) Jake Ratcliffe	(Australia) Kieran Webster	(Australia) John Kennedy
2022	(Australia) Casey Kubara	(Australia) Joey Hughes	(Australia) Michael James	(Canada) Ty Wishart	(Australia) Ethan Hawes	(Australia) Casey Kubara	(Canada) Kevin Noble
2023	(Canada) Scott Timmins	(Canada) Liam Hughes	(Canada) Andrew Masters	(Canada) Ty Wishart	(Australia) Riley Klugerman	(Australia) Jordan Kyros	(Canada) Benjamin Breault
2024	(Canada) Kaden Elder	(New Zealand) Jake Ratcliffe	(Canada) Rylan Toth	(Australia) Ryan Annesley	(Australia) Daniel Koudelka	(Australia) Robert Haselhurst	(Australia) Jason Kvisle
2025	(Japan) Yu Hikosaka	(Australia) Mackenzie Caruana	(Australia) Aleksi Toivonen	(Australia) Bray Crowder	(Australia) Artem Astafiev (Australia) Luka Loria	(Australia) Wehebe Darge	(Australia) Benjamin Breault
2026	(Canada) Brody Crane	(Canada) Francis Drolet	(Canada) Ryan Burroughs	(Canada) Danick Bouchard	(Australia) Lachlan Sucher	(Australia) Kale Costa	(Canada) Kevin Noble

== Media coverage ==
In March 2026, the ABC released a documentary episode of their 'Play On' series that featured the AIHL. The season 2 episode 3 is available on the ABC iView streaming service and was shot throughout the 2025 AIHL season. Paul Kennedy was the presenter and producer, and the episode focused on how imports influence the league, in particular Japanese goaltender Tatsunoshin Ishida.

Damien Ketlo, the 2017 save percentage leader, became a contestant on Big Brother Canada season 7 and mentioned Australian hockey in episode 22.

== See also ==
- Players in the AIHL
- List of AIHL seasons
- Australian Women's Ice Hockey League
- New Zealand Ice Hockey League
