= West Auckland, New Zealand =

Region of Auckland, New Zealand

West Auckland
- Metropolitan West Auckland captured by a Planet Labs satellite in 2016

- Location in New Zealand
- Coordinates: 36°48′S 174°36′E
- Country: New Zealand
- Island: North Island
- Region: Auckland Region

Government
  - MPs: Cameron Brewer (National); Chris Penk (National); Paulo Garcia (National); Carmel Sepuloni (Labour); Phil Twyford (Labour)

Area
  - Total: 572.09 km^{2} (220.89 sq mi)

Population (June 2025)
  - Total: 341,190
  - Density: 596.39/km^{2} (1,544.6/sq mi)
- Time zone: UTC+12 (NZST)
  - Summer (DST): UTC+13 (NZDT)
- Area code: 09

West Auckland (Māori: Te Uru o Tāmaki Makaurau or Māori: Tāmaki ki te Hauauru) is one of the major geographical areas of Auckland, the largest city in New Zealand. Much of the area is dominated by the Waitākere Ranges, the eastern slopes of the Miocene era Waitākere volcano which was upraised from the ocean floor, and now one of the largest regional parks in New Zealand. The metropolitan area of West Auckland developed between the Waitākere Ranges to the west and the upper reaches of the Waitematā Harbour to the east. It covers areas such as Glen Eden, Henderson, Massey and New Lynn.

West Auckland is within the rohe of Te Kawerau ā Maki, whose traditional names for the area were Hikurangi, Waitākere, and Te Wao Nui a Tiriwa, the latter of which refers to the forest of the greater Waitākere Ranges area. Most settlements and pā were centred around the west coast beaches and the Waitākere River valley. Two of the major waka portages are found in the area: the Te Tōanga Waka (the Whau River portage), and Te Tōangaroa (the Kumeū portage), connecting the Waitematā, Manukau and Kaipara harbours.

European settlement of the region began in the 1840s, centred around the kauri logging trade. Later industries developed around kauri gum digging, orchards, vineyards and the clay brickworks of the estuaries of the Waitematā Harbour, most notably at New Lynn on the Whau River. Originally isolated from the developing city of Auckland on the Auckland isthmus, West Auckland began to expand after being connected to the North Auckland railway line in 1880 and the Northwestern Motorway in the 1950s.

== Definition and etymologies ==
The Whau River has often been used as a border between western and central Auckland

West Auckland is not a strictly defined area. It includes the former Waitakere City, which existed between 1989 and 2010 between the Whau River and Hobsonville, an area which includes major suburbs such as Henderson, Te Atatū, Glen Eden, Titirangi and New Lynn. West Auckland typically also includes Avondale and Blockhouse Bay. The Whau River and Te Tōanga Waka (the Whau portage) marked the border between the former Waitakere and Auckland cities, a border which was first established between Eden County on the Auckland isthmus and Waitemata County in 1876. This border originally existed much earlier than, as the rohe marker between Te Kawerau ā Maki and Tāmaki isthmus iwi. Avondale and Blockhouse Bay are east of the Whau River on the Auckland isthmus, but are included in the definition due to their strong historical ties. Towns in southwestern Rodney, such as Helensville, Riverhead, Waimauku, Kumeū and Huapai are also often described as West Auckland. Occasionally a stricter definition of West Auckland is used in reports and scientific literature, which includes just the Henderson-Massey, Waitākere Ranges and Whau local board areas.

The traditional Tāmaki Māori names for the area include Hikurangi, Waitākere, Whakatū and Te Wao Nui a Tiriwa. Hikurangi referred to the central and western Waitākere Ranges south of the Waitākere River, and was originally a name given by Rakatāura, the tohunga of the Tainui migratory canoe to a location south of Piha. Hikurangi is a common placename across Polynesia, and likely marked the point on the coast where the last light of the day reached. The name Wai-tākere ("cascading water") originated as a name for a rock at Te Henga / Bethells Beach found at the former mouth of the Waitākere River, which was later applied to the river, Ranges, and West Auckland in general. The name refers to the action of the water striking the rock as the waves came into shore, and became popularised in the early 18th century during Te Raupatu Tihore ("The Stripping Conquest"), when a Te Kawerau ā Maki chief's body was laid on this rock.

Whakatū is the traditional name for the Tasman Sea and the beaches south of Te Henga / Bethells Beach. It is a shortening of the name Nga Tai Whakatū a Kupe ("The Upraised Seas of Kupe"), referring to Kupe's visit to the west coast and his attempts to evade people pursuing him, by chanting a karakia to make the west coast seas rough. Te Wao Nui a Tiriwa, the Great Forest of Tiriwa, references the name of Tiriwa, a chief of the supernatural Tūrehu people. The name refers to all of the forested areas of the Waitākere Ranges south from Muriwai and the Kaipara Harbour portage to the Manukau Harbour.

The modern use of West Auckland to refer to areas such as New Lynn and Henderson was popularised in the 1960s and 1970s. Prior to this, West Auckland or Western Auckland mostly referred to the western portions of the old Auckland City, such as Ponsonby and Kingsland. The name Auckland was given to the future capital of New Zealand in 1840 by William Hobson, after patron George Eden, 1st Earl of Auckland.

=== Westies ===
Westie is a term used to describe a sub-culture from West Auckland, acting also as a societal identifier. Similar to the word bogan, the stereotype usually involves a macho, working class Pākehā with poor taste, and the mullet haircut. The Westie sub-culture was depicted in the New Zealand television series Outrageous Fortune (2005–2010), with particular attention to the distinctive fashion, musical preferences and interest in cars typical of this social group. These days the stereotype of Auckland's 'Westies' is evolving as the area's development brings in a more sophisticated and diverse population.

== Geography ==
Twenty-two million years ago, due to subduction of the Pacific Plate, most of the Auckland region was lowered 2,000–3,000 metres (6,600–9,800 ft) below sea level, forming a sedimentary basin. Approximately 20 million years ago, this subduction led to the formation of the Waitākere volcano, a partially submerged volcano located to the west of the modern Auckland region. The volcano is the largest stratovolcano in the geologic history of New Zealand, over 50 kilometres (31 mi) in diameter and reaching an estimated height of 4,000 metres (13,000 ft) above the sea floor. Between 3 and 5 million years ago, tectonic forces uplifted the Waitākere Ranges and central Auckland, while subsiding the Manukau and inner Waitematā harbours. The Waitākere Ranges are the remnants of the eastern slopes of the Waitākere volcano, while the lowlands of suburban West Auckland are formed of Waitemata Group sandstone from the ancient sedimentary basin. Many of the areas directly adjacent to the Waitematā Harbour, such as New Lynn, Te Atatū and Hobsonville, are formed from rhyolitic clays and peat, formed from eroding soil and interactions with the harbour.

The modern topography of West Auckland began to form approximately 8,000 years ago when the sea level rose at the end of the Last Glacial maximum. Prior to this, the Manukau and Waitematā harbours were forested river valleys, and the Tasman Sea shoreline was over 20 kilometres (12 mi) west of its current location. The mouths of the rivers of West Auckland flooded, forming into large estuaries. Tidal mudflats formed at the Manukau Harbour river mouths, such as Huia, Big Muddy Creek and Little Muddy Creek. Sand dunes formed along the estuaries of the west coast, creating beaches such as Piha and Te Henga / Bethells Beach. The black ironsand of these beaches is volcanic material from Mount Taranaki (including the Pouakai Range and Sugar Loaf Islands volcanoes) which has drifted northwards, and potentially material from the Taupō Volcano and other central North Island volcanoes which travelled down the Waikato River as sediment.

== Ecology ==
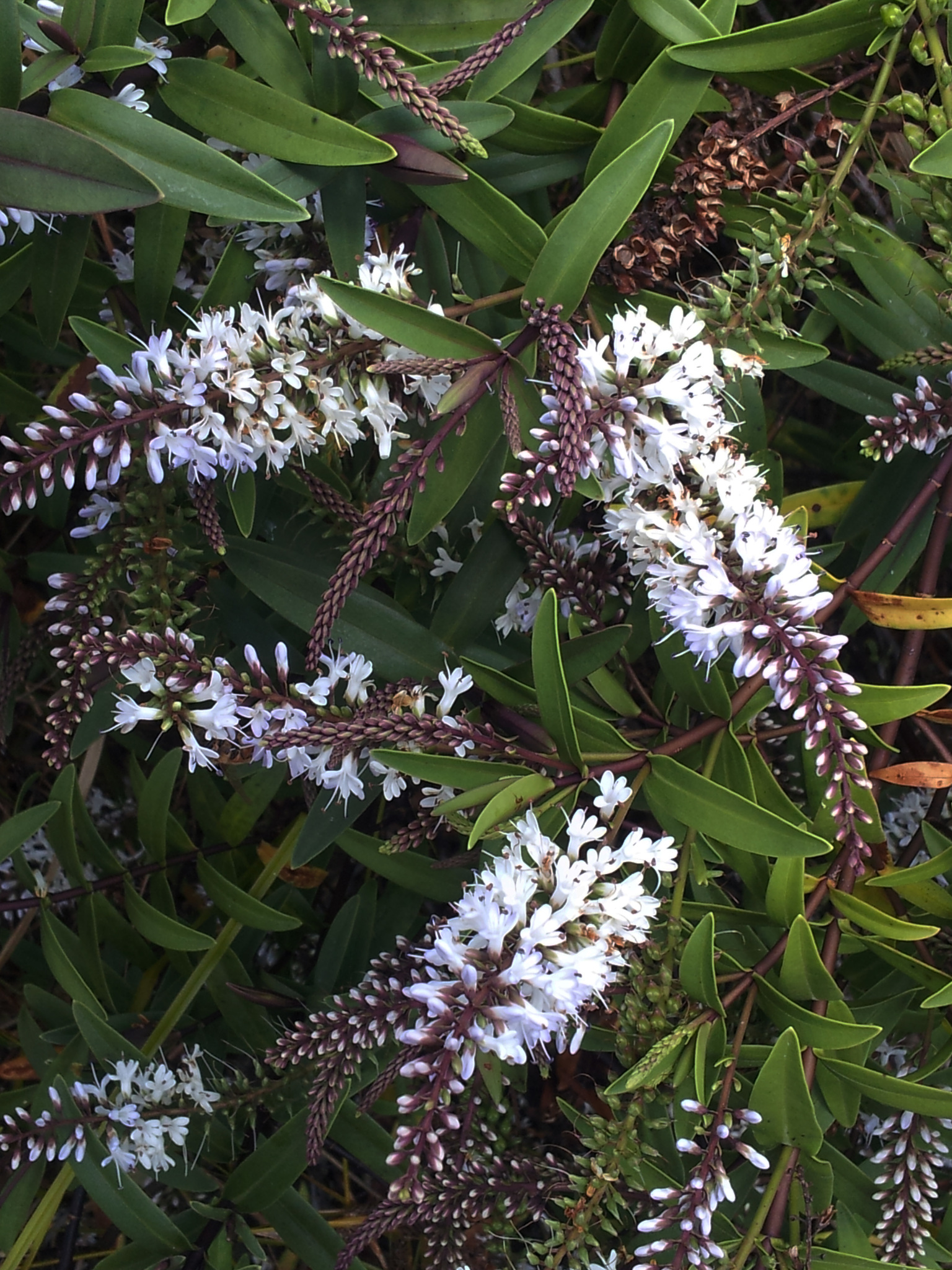
The Waitākere rock koromiko, Veronica bishopiana, is endemic to the Waitākere Ranges

While much of West Auckland, especially the Waitākere Ranges, was historically dominated by kauri, northern rātā, rimu most of the kauri trees were felled as a part of the kauri logging industry. One plant species is native to West Auckland, Veronica bishopiana, the Waitākere rock koromiko. A number of other plant species are primarily found in coastal West Auckland, including Sophora fulvida, the west coast kōwhai and Veronica obtusata, the coastal hebe. Sophora fulvida is a common sight in West Auckland; other species of kōwhai are not allowed to be planted west of Scenic Drive. The Waitākere Ranges are known for the wide variety of fern species (over 110), as well as native orchids, many of which self-established from seeds carried by winds from the east coast of Australia.

The areas of West Auckland close to the Waitematā Harbour, such as Henderson, Te Atatū Peninsula and Whenuapai, were formerly covered in broadleaf forest, predominantly kahikatea, pukatea trees, and a thick growth of nīkau palms. As the soils around Titirangi and Laingholm are more sedimentary than the Waitākere Ranges volcanic soil, tōtara was widespread, alongside kohekohe, pūriri, karaka and nīkau palm trees.

The Waitākere Ranges are home to many native species of bird, the New Zealand long-tailed bat and Hochstetter's frog, which have been impacted by introduced predatory species including rodents, stoats, weasels, possums and cats. In 2002, Ark in the Park was established as an open sanctuary to reintroduce native species to the Waitākere Ranges. Whiteheads (pōpokatea), North Island robin (toutouwai) and North Island kōkako have all been successfully re-established in the area, and between 2014 and 2016 brown teals (pāteke) were reintroduced to the nearby Matuku Reserve. The west coast beaches are nesting locations for many seabird species, including the banded dotterel and the grey-faced petrel, and the korowai gecko is endemic to the west coast near Muriwai.

The catchments of the Te Wai-o-Pareira / Henderson Creek and the Whau River are home to marine species including the New Zealand longfin eel, banded kōkopu, common galaxias (īnanga) and the freshwater crab Amarinus lacustris.

== Human context ==
=== Māori history ===
==== Origins ====
Many early settlements in West Auckland were along the west coast beaches (pictured: Karekare)

The area was settled early in Māori history, by people arriving on Māori migration canoes such as the Moekākara and Tainui. Māori settlement of the Auckland region began at least 800 years ago, in the 13th century or earlier. Some of the first tribal identities that developed for Tāmaki Māori who settled in West Auckland include Tini o Maruiwi, Ngā Oho and Ngā Iwi.

One of the earliest individuals associated with the area is Tiriwa, a chief of the supernatural Tūrehu people, who is involved with the traditional story of the creation of Rangitoto Island, by uplifting it from Karekare on the west coast. The early Polynesian navigator Kupe visited the west coast. The Tasman Sea alongside the coast was named after Kupe, and traditional stories tell of his visit to Paratutae Island, leaving paddle marks in the cliffs of the island to commemorate his visit. The Tainui tohunga Rakataura (also known as Hape) was known to have visited the region after arriving in New Zealand, naming many locations along the west coast. He is the namesake of the Karangahape Peninsula at Cornwallis, as well as the ancient walking track linking the peninsula to the central Tāmaki isthmus (part of which became Karangahape Road).

==== Early settlement ====
Most Māori settlements in West Auckland centred around the west coast beaches and the Waitākere River valley, especially at Te Henga / Bethells Beach. Instead of living in permanent settlements, Te Kawerau ā Maki and other earlier Tāmaki Māori groups seasonally migrated across the region. The west coast was well known for its abundant seafood and productive soil, where crops such as kūmara, taro, hue (calabash/bottle gourd) and aruhe could be grown, and for the diversity of birds, eels, crayfish and berries found in the ranges. Archaeological investigations of middens show evidence of regional trade between different early Māori peoples, including pipi, cockles and mud-snail shells not native to the area. Unlike most defensive pā found on the Auckland isthmus, not many Waitākere pā used defensive ditchwork, instead preferring natural barriers.

Few settlements were found in the central Waitākere Ranges or in the modern urban centres of West Auckland. Some notable exceptions were near the portages where waka could be hauled between the three harbours of West Auckland: Te Tōangaroa, the portage linking the Kaipara Harbour in the north to the Waitematā Harbour via the Kaipara River and Kumeū River; and Te Tōanga Waka, the Whau River portage linking the Waitematā Harbour to the Manukau Harbour in the south. Defensive pā and kāinga (villages) were found close to the portages and the major walking tracks across the area, including at the Opanuku Stream and the Huruhuru Creek. A number of settlements also existed on the Te Atatū Peninsula, including Ōrukuwai and Ōrangihina.

==== Te Kawerau ā Maki ====
In the early 1600s, members of Ngāti Awa from the Kawhia Harbour, most notably the rangatira Maki and his brother Matāhu, migrated north to the Tāmaki Makaurau region, where they had ancestral ties. Maki conquered and united Tāmaki Māori people of the west coast and northern Auckland region. Within a few generations, the name Te Kawerau ā Maki developed to refer to this collective. Those living on the west coast retained the name Te Kawerau ā Maki, while those living at Mahurangi (modern-day Warkworth) adopted the name Ngāti Manuhiri, and Ngāti Kahu for the people who settled on the North Shore.

In the early 1700s, Ngāti Whātua migrated south into the Kaipara area (modern-day Helensville). Initially relations between the iwi were friendly, and many important marriages were made between the peoples (some of which formed the Ngāti Whātua hapū Ngāti Rongo). Hostilities broke out and Ngāti Whātua asked for assistance from Kāwharu, a famed Tainui warrior from Kawhia. Kāwharu's repeated attacks of the Waitākere Ranges settlements became known as Te Raupatu Tīhore, or the stripping conquest. Lasting peace between Te Kawerau ā Maki and Ngāti Whātua was forged by Maki's grandson Te Au o Te Whenua, who fixed the rohe (border) between Muriwai Beach and Rangitōpuni (Riverhead).

In the 1740s, war broke out between Ngāti Whātua and Waiohua, the confederation of Tāmaki Māori tribes centred to the east, on the Tāmaki isthmus. While Te Kawerau ā Maki remained neutral, the battle of Te-Rangi-hinganga-tahi, in which the Waiohua paramount chief Kiwi Tāmaki was killed, was held at Paruroa (Big Muddy Creek) on Te Kawerau ā Maki lands.

In the late 18th and early 19th centuries, Te Kawerau ā Maki were only rarely directly contacted by Europeans, instead primarily receiving European products such as potatoes and pigs through neighbouring Tāmaki Māori tribes. Significant numbers of Te Kawerau ā Maki lost their lives due to influenza and the Musket Wars of the 1820s. After a period of exile from the region, Te Kawerau ā Maki returned to their lands, primarily settling at a musket pā at Te Henga / Bethells Beach.

=== European history ===
==== The Cornwallis settlement and the establishment of Auckland ====
The Cornwallis settlement shown on an 1853 map of the Manukau Harbour

The earliest permanent European settlement in the Auckland region was the Cornwallis, which was settled in 1835 by Australian timber merchant Thomas Mitchell. Helped by William White of the English Wesleyan Mission, Mitchell negotiated with the chief Āpihai Te Kawau of Ngāti Whātua for the purchase of 40,000 acres (16,000 ha) of land in West Auckland on the shores of the Manukau Harbour. After establishing a timber mill in 1836, Mitchell drowned only months later, and the land was sold to Captain William Cornwallis Symonds. Symonds formed a company to create a large-scale settlement at Cornwallis focused on logging, trading and shipping, subdividing 220 plots of land in the area. Cornwallis was advertised as idyllic and fertile to Scottish settlers, and after 88 plots of land had been sold, the settler ship Brilliant left Glasgow in 1840. The settlement had collapsed by 1843, due to its remoteness, land rights issues and the death of Symonds, with many residents moving to Onehunga.

In 1840 after the signing of the Treaty of Waitangi, paramount chief Āpihai Te Kawau made a tuku (strategic gift) of land on the Waitematā Harbour to William Hobson, the first Governor of New Zealand, as a location for the capital of the colony of New Zealand. This location became the modern city of Auckland. Many further tuku and land purchases were made; the earliest in West Auckland were organised by Ngāti Whātua, without the knowledge or consent of the senior rangatira of Te Kawerau ā Maki, however some purchases in the 1850s involved the iwi.

==== Early settlements ====
Te Wai-o-Pareira / Henderson Creek in the 1890s, with the township of Henderson's Mill in the distance

In 1844, 18,000 acres (7,300 ha) of land at Te Atatū and Henderson were sold to Thomas Henderson and John Macfarlane, who established a kauri logging sawmill on Te Wai-o-Pareira / Henderson Creek. Communities developed around the kauri logging business at Riverhead and Helensville, which were later important trade centres for the kauri gum industry that developed in the Waitākere Ranges foothills. Between 1840 and 1940, 23 timber mills worked the Waitākere Ranges, felling about 120,000 trees. By the 1920s there was little kauri forest left in the Waitākeres, and the area continued to be used to search for kauri gum until the early 20th century.

The first brick kiln in West Auckland was built by Daniel Pollen in 1852, on the Rosebank Peninsula along the shores of the Whau River. Brickworks and the pottery industry became a major industry in the area, with 39 brickworks active along the shores of the Waitematā Harbour, primarily on the shores of the Whau River. From 1853, rural West Auckland around Glen Eden and Oratia was developed into orchards. New Lynn developed as a trade centre after 1865 due to the port along the estuarial Whau River, which could only be used at high tide. The North Auckland Line began operating in March 1880, connecting central Auckland to stations at Avondale, New Lynn and Glen Eden. The line was extended to Henderson by December, and to Helensville by July 1881. The railway encouraged growth along the corridor between Auckland and Henderson.

The West Auckland orchards prospered in the early 1900s after immigrants from Dalmatia (modern-day Croatia) settled in the area. In 1907, Lebanese New Zealander Assid Abraham Corban developed a vineyard at Henderson. By the 1920s, the Lincoln Road, Swanson Road and Sturges Road areas had developed into orchards run primarily by Dalmatian families, and in the 1940s these families began establishing vineyards at Kumeū and Huapai.

In the 1920s and 1930s, flat land throughout Hobsonville and Whenuapai was the site of an airfield development for the New Zealand Air Force. Whenuapai became the main airport for civilian aviation between 1945 and 1965. The Northwestern Motorway was first developed as a way for passengers to more efficiently drive to the airport at Whenuapai, with the first section opening in 1952.

==== Waitākere Ranges dams and regional park ====
The Waitākere Dam, constructed in the 1900s to supply drinking water to the city of Auckland

By the late 19th century, Auckland City was plagued with seasonal droughts. A number of options were considered to counter this, including the construction of water reservoirs in the Waitākere Ranges. The first of these projects was the Waitākere Dam in the north-eastern Waitākere Ranges, which was completed in 1910. Further reservoirs were constructed along the different river catchments in the Waitākere Ranges: the Upper Nihotupu Reservoir in 1923; the Huia Reservoir in 1929; and the Lower Nihotupu Reservoir in 1948.

The construction of the Waitākere Dam permanently reduced the flow of the Waitākere River, greatly impacting the Te Kawerau ā Maki community at Te Henga / Bethells Beach. Between the 1910s and 1950s, most members of Te Kawerau ā Maki moved away from their traditional rohe, in search of employment or community with other Māori. After the construction of the dams, the Nihotupu and Huia areas reforested in native bush. The native forest left a strong impression on residents who lived in these communities, and was one of the major factors that sparked the campaign for the Waitākere Ranges to become a nature reserve.

The Auckland Centennial Memorial Park, which opened in 1940, was formed from various pockets of land that had been reserved by the Auckland City Council starting in 1895. Titirangi resident Arthur Mead, the principal engineer who created the Waitākere Ranges dams, lobbied the city council and negotiated with landowners to expand the park. Owing to the efforts of Mead, the park had tripled in size by 1964, when it became the Waitākere Ranges Regional Park.

==== Urban development ====
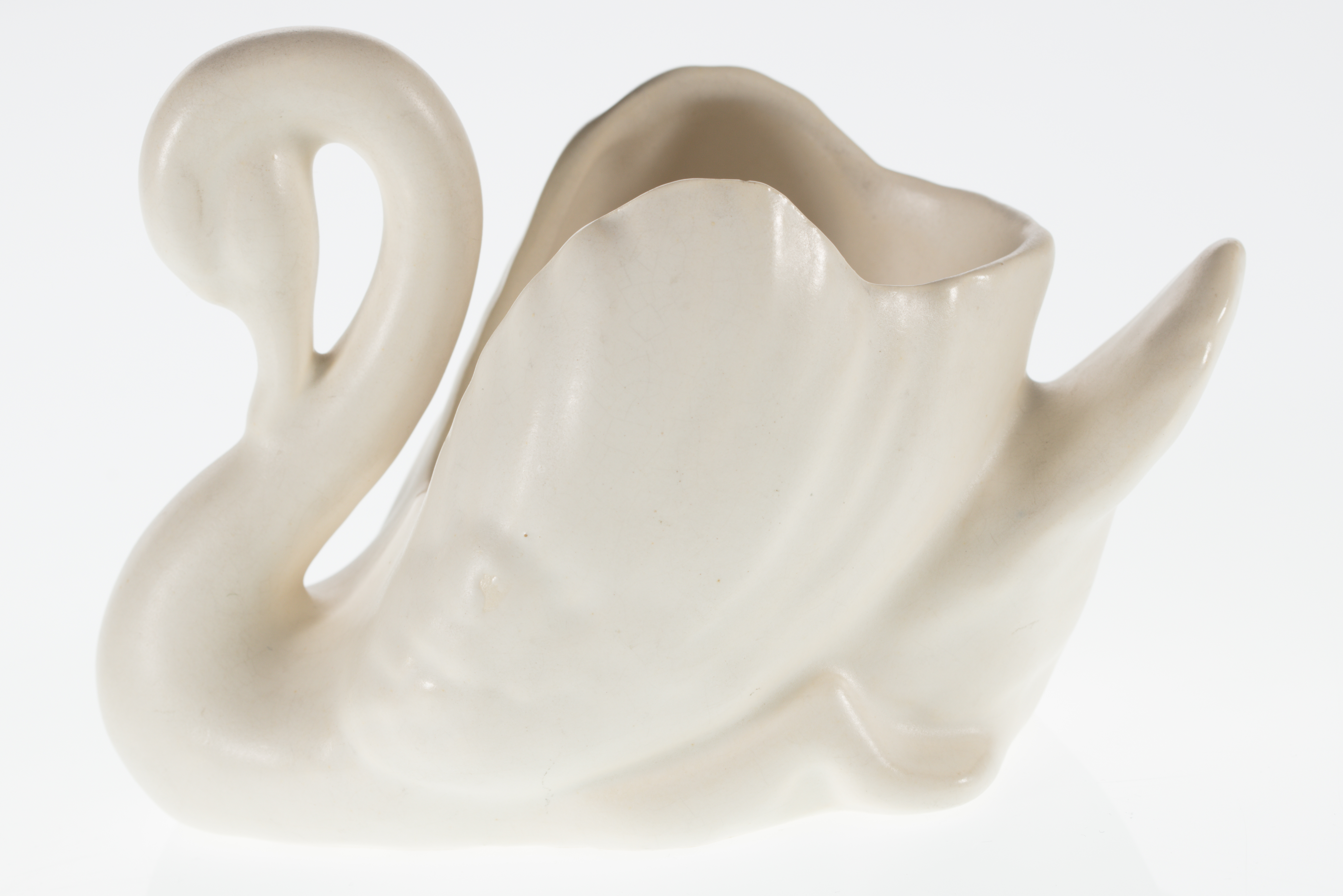
Ceramics manufacturer Crown Lynn was a major employer in West Auckland until the 1980s (pictured: a ceramic swan vase produced by Crown Lynn, dating to the late 1940s/early 1950s)

By the early 1950s, four major centres had developed to the west of Auckland: New Lynn, Henderson, Helensville and Glen Eden. These areas had large enough populations to become boroughs with their own local government, splitting from the rural Waitemata County. Over the next 20 years, the area saw an explosion in population, driven by the construction of the Northwestern Motorway and the development of low-cost housing at Te Atatū, Rānui and Massey. By this time, the area was no longer seen as scattered rural communities, and had developed into satellite suburbs of Auckland. The post-war years saw widespread migration of Māori from rural areas to West Auckland. This happened a second time in the 1970s, as urban Māori communities moved away from the inner suburbs of Auckland to areas such as Te Atatū. In 1980, Hoani Waititi Marae opened in West Auckland, to serve the urban Māori population of West Auckland. By the mid-2000s, West Auckland had the largest Ngāpuhi population in the country outside of Northland. Similarly, areas such as Rānui and Massey developed as centres for Pasifika New Zealander communities.

The New Zealand Brick Tile and Pottery Company diversified and expanded into china production to supply local markets and American troops during World War II. Under the name Crown Lynn, the company developed into the largest pottery in the Southern Hemisphere. In 1963, LynnMall opened, becoming the first American-style shopping mall in New Zealand. It quickly became a major centre for retail in Auckland. The Henderson Borough Council wanted to replicate this success, and in 1968 opened Henderson Square, now known as WestCity Waitakere.

In 1975, West Auckland was connected to the North Shore when the Upper Harbour Bridge was constructed across the Upper Waitematā Harbour. In the late 1980s, the Crown Lynn factory closed due to competition from overseas imports.

== Demographics ==
West Auckland covers 572.09 km^{2} (220.89 sq mi) (Note: In this section, West Auckland is treated as including Waitākere and Whau wards, parts of Rodney ward south of Riverhead and Waimauku, and parts of Albany ward west of Waitematā Harbour as listed in the table of individual statistical areas.) and had an estimated population of 341,190 as of June 2025, with a population density of 596 inhabitants per square kilometre (1,540 inhabitants per square mile).

Historical population
Year	Pop.	±% p.a.
2006	236,454	—
2013	252,795	+0.96%
2018	282,327	+2.23%
2023	307,722	+1.74%
The 2006 population is for a larger area of 578.20 km^{2}. Source:

West Auckland had a population of 307,722 in the 2023 New Zealand census, an increase of 25,395 people (9.0%) since the 2018 census, and an increase of 54,927 people (21.7%) since the 2013 census. There were 152,832 males, 153,759 females and 1,149 people of other genders in 99,573 dwellings. 3.4% of people identified as LGBTIQ+. There were 62,637 people (20.4%) aged under 15 years, 60,273 (19.6%) aged 15 to 29, 147,735 (48.0%) aged 30 to 64, and 37,071 (12.0%) aged 65 or older.

People could identify as more than one ethnicity. The results were 50.3% European (Pākehā); 14.1% Māori; 17.3% Pasifika; 31.3% Asian; 2.9% Middle Eastern, Latin American and African New Zealanders (MELAA); and 2.0% other, which includes people giving their ethnicity as "New Zealander". English was spoken by 92.3%, Māori language by 3.0%, Samoan by 4.8%, and other languages by 27.8%. No language could be spoken by 2.7% (e.g. too young to talk). New Zealand Sign Language was known by 0.5%. The percentage of people born overseas was 39.9, compared with 28.8% nationally.

Religious affiliations were 33.0% Christian, 6.6% Hindu, 3.7% Islam, 0.8% Māori religious beliefs, 1.8% Buddhist, 0.4% New Age, 0.1% Jewish, and 1.7% other religions. People who answered that they had no religion were 45.8%, and 6.3% of people did not answer the census question.

Of those at least 15 years old, 71,427 (29.1%) people had a bachelor's or higher degree, 108,465 (44.3%) had a post-high school certificate or diploma, and 65,172 (26.6%) people exclusively held high school qualifications. 31,542 people (12.9%) earned over $100,000 compared to 12.1% nationally. The employment status of those at least 15 was that 133,521 (54.5%) people were employed full-time, 28,782 (11.7%) were part-time, and 8,526 (3.5%) were unemployed.

Individual statistical areas
Name	Area (km^{2})	Population	Density (per km^{2})	Dwellings	Median age	Median income
Kumeū	47.56	10,710	225	3,504	36.6 years	$54,800
Waitākere West	214.62	6,084	28	2,163	43.2 years	$47,700
Taupaki	25.73	1,797	70	579	43.5 years	$46,100
Swanson	2.09	3,696	1,768	1,116	33.3 years	$54,400
Whenuapai	17.03	6,300	370	2,091	33.5 years	$60,700
Hobsonville	6.42	14,025	2,185	4,977	34.5 years	$63,500
West Harbour	4.27	11,169	2.616	3,471	37.0 years	$44,500
Westgate	3.57	3,060	857	990	32.9 years	$50,500
Massey	11.57	24,672	2,132	7,359	32.8 years	$42,500
Te Atatū Peninsula	5.46	14,454	2,647	4,878	35.2 years	$49,600
Henderson	15.87	39,678	2,500	12,648	35.7 years	$38,500
Rānui	3.58	13,371	3,735	3,792	32.2 years	$37,600
Te Atatū South	4.55	15,339	3,371	5,022	35.2 years	$43,900
Waitākere East	58.74	8,160	139	2,706	43.1 years	$49,100
Avondale	8.31	23,364	2,812	7,341	34.4 years	$40,900
Glendene	2.51	7,719	3,075	2,403	35.5 years	$41,700
Kelston	1.80	5,676	3,153	1,617	32.8 years	$39,100
Sunnyvale	1.97	6,333	3,215	1,851	32.8 years	$43,800
Glen Eden	7.53	19,593	2,602	6,582	34.6 years	$44,600
New Lynn	6.36	20,877	3,283	7,428	35.6 years	$42,000
Titirangi	12.18	14,856	1,220	5,148	41.0 years	$54,000
Green Bay	2.29	4,914	2,146	1,947	44.0 years	$38,700
New Windsor	1.99	7,737	3,888	2,238	34.8 years	$39,300
Blockhouse Bay	3.91	13,107	3,352	4,119	38.6 years	$40,600
Laingholm	4.08	2,316	568	828	42.4 years	$54,000
Waipatukahu	56.12	1,626	29	549	43.4 years	$46,200
Waimauku	1.44	1,317	915	420	39.2 years	$57,100
Muriwai	3.02	1,125	373	285	42.9 years	$52,700
Muriwai Valley-Bethells Beach	35.36	1,089	31	378	42.9 years	$45,400
Riverhead	2.16	3,558	1,647	1,143	37.0 years	$62,200
New Zealand					38.1 years	$41,500

== Landmarks and features ==
=== Notable buildings and sites ===
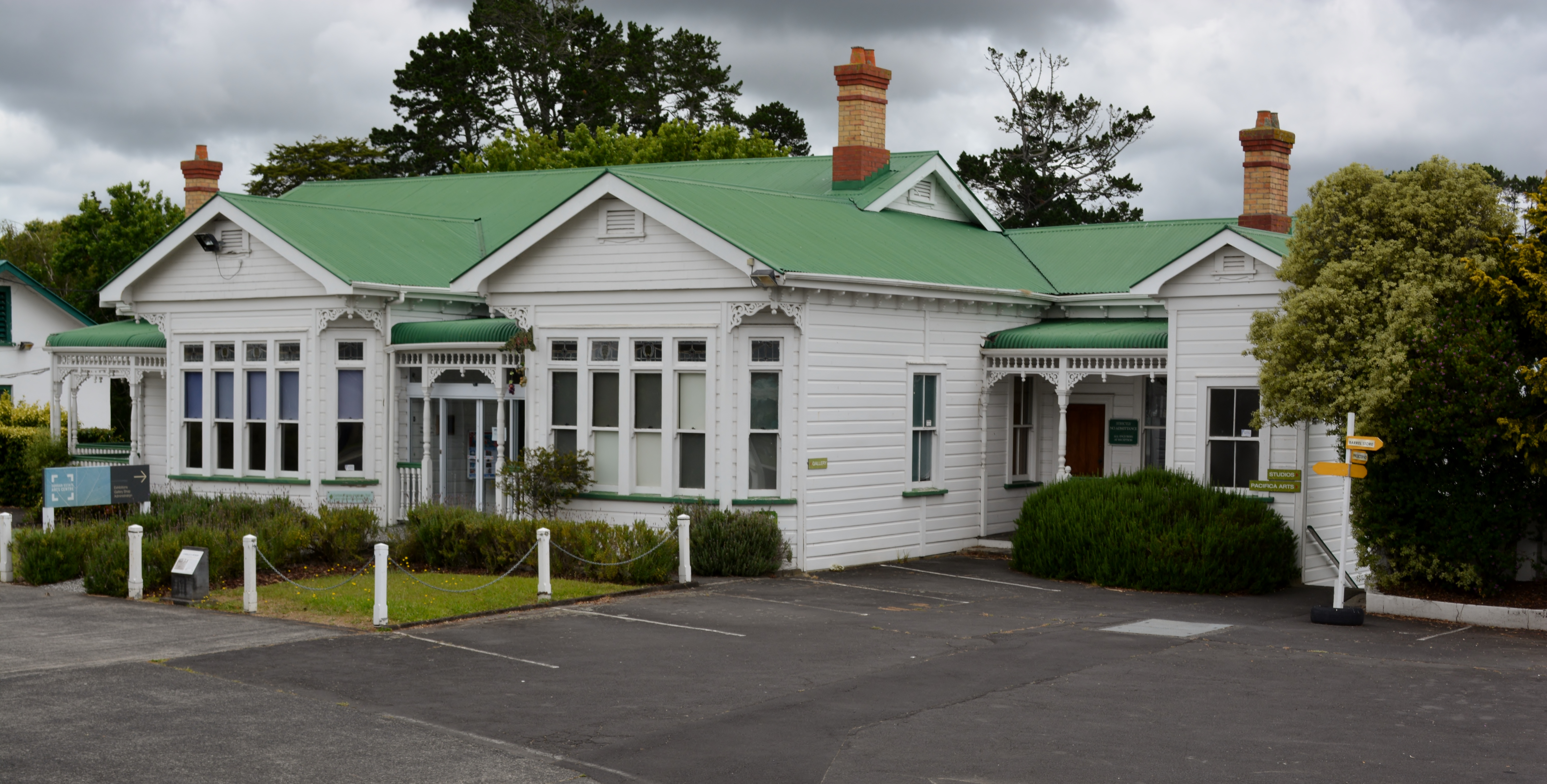
Corban Estate Arts Centre, a former vineyard in West Auckland

- Corban Estate Arts Centre – a former vineyard and current centre for arts located in Henderson
- Glen Eden Playhouse Theatre – a historic community theatre
- Hoani Waititi Marae – the first urban marae built in New Zealand, and a centre for Māori language, culture and practice
- Hollywood Cinema – a historic cinema in Avondale
- RNZAF Base Auckland – a large base of the Royal New Zealand Air Force in Whenuapai
- St Jude's Church and Hall – a Gothic-revival Anglican church built in 1884
- Te Uru Waitākere Contemporary Gallery – a contemporary art gallery located in Titirangi
- Waiatarua TV Transmitter – a former analogue television transmission mast in Waiatarua, located near the highest point of the eastern Waitākere Ranges
- Waikumete Cemetery in Glen Eden – the largest cemetery in New Zealand, which was established in 1886 as a cemetery for Auckland, and includes the historic Chapel of Faith in the Oaks, a large nature reserve and a memorial for the 1918 flu pandemic
- Watyarnprateep Buddhist Temple – a centre for Thai Buddhism in Kelston

=== Natural areas ===
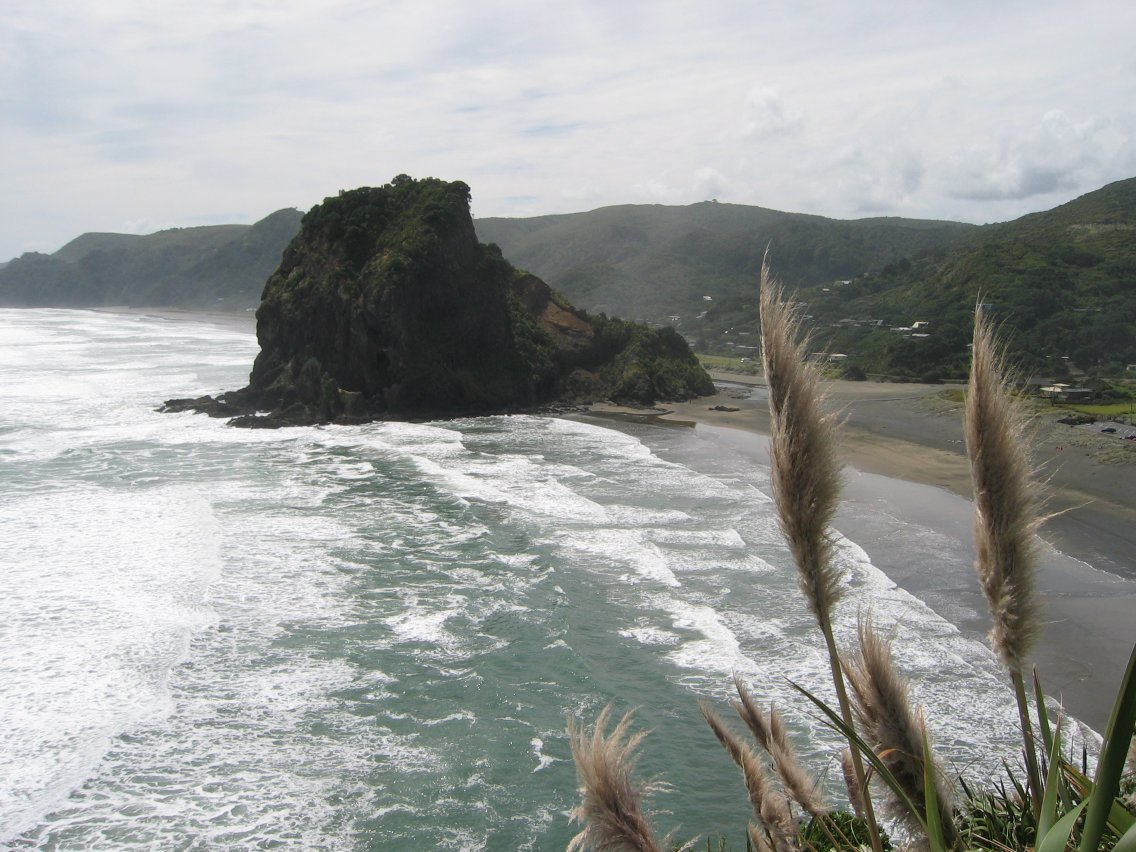
Lion Rock at Piha, one of the beaches of the west coast

- The Waitākere Ranges – a regional park and the remnants of a Miocene volcano. The ranges feature a number of water reserves, including the Lower Nihotupu Reservoir and the Waitākere Reservoir, the Ark in the Park conservation project, the Arataki Visitor Centre and locations such as the Kitekite Falls.
- Te Wai-o-Pareira / Henderson Creek – an estuarial arm of the Waitematā Harbour that covers the catchment for much of West Auckland. Since the early 2000s, an initiative called Project Twin Streams has worked on restoring forests and creating walkways and cycleways along the catchment.
- The Whau River – an estuarial arm of the Waitematā Harbour. The Whau River is the location of the Te Whau coastal pathway, which has been under construction since 2015.
- The west coast beaches, including Muriwai, Te Henga / Bethells Beach, Piha, Karekare and Whatipu. The Tasman Sea beaches of Auckland have iron-rich black sand, which originated from volcanic eruptions.

== Education ==
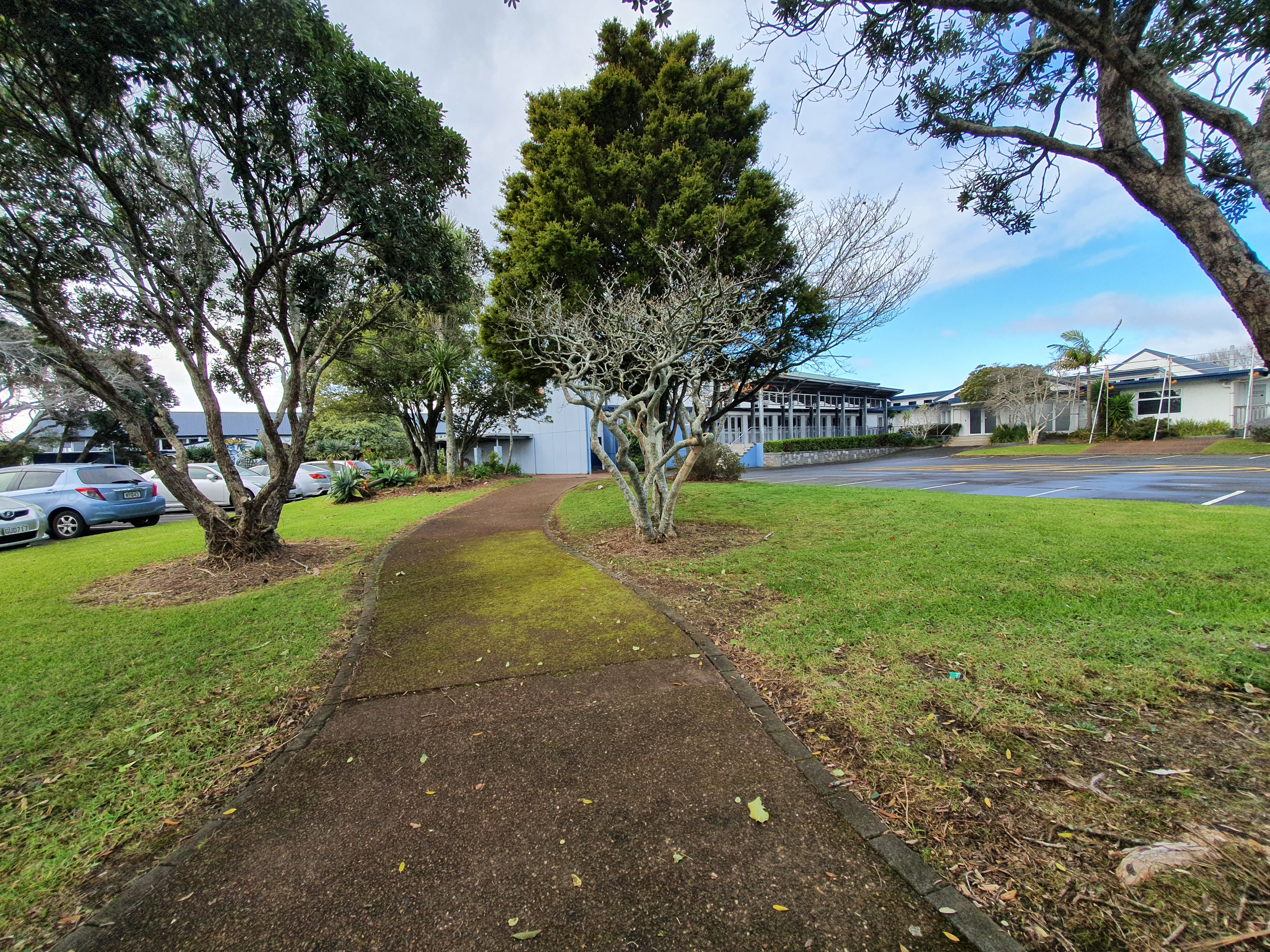
Kelston Girls' College is the site of one of the earliest schools to open in West Auckland

The first schools that began operating in West Auckland were Avondale School, which opened in 1860, a school held in the library of Henderson's Mill in 1873, and the New Lynn School, which opened on the modern site of Kelston Girls' College in 1888.

West Auckland has a number of co-educational secondary schools, including Avondale College, one of the largest high schools in New Zealand with a roll of 2,789 students. Other state co-educational schools include Massey High School (2,113 students), Henderson High School (1,048 students), Waitakere College (1,988 students), Rutherford College (1,607 students), Hobsonville Point Secondary School (1,056 students) and Green Bay High School (1,959 students). The first private secondary school in West Auckland, ACG Sunderland School and College, opened in 2007 at the former site of the Waitakere City Council buildings, and has a roll of 886 students.

West Auckland is also home to four single-sex secondary schools: Kelston Boys' High School (821 students) and Kelston Girls' College (594 students), and the state-integrated Catholic schools Liston College and St Dominic's College, which have rolls of 856 and 851 students, respectively.

== Transportation ==
West Auckland has been served by railway since the late 19th century. The North Auckland Line first opened in 1880, and was extended to Helensville by 1881. The train line is operated as the Western Line, which operates passenger services between Swanson and Britomart in the Auckland city centre.

The Northwestern Motorway opened between central Auckland and Te Atatū in 1952, encouraging growth around the western Waitematā Harbour. The Southwestern Motorway, which borders West Auckland, became connected directly to the Northwestern Motorway when the Waterview Connection opened to traffic in July 2017. The first stages of the Northwestern Busway, a project that was first envisioned as a light rail line adjacent to the Northwestern Motorway, are currently under construction. In addition to the motorways, major roads in West Auckland include Great North Road, Don Buck Road, Lincoln Road, West Coast Road, Swanson Road, Scenic Drive and Portage Road.

Two ferry terminals in West Auckland, at West Harbour and Hobsonville, operate commuter ferry services to the Auckland city centre.

== Amenities ==
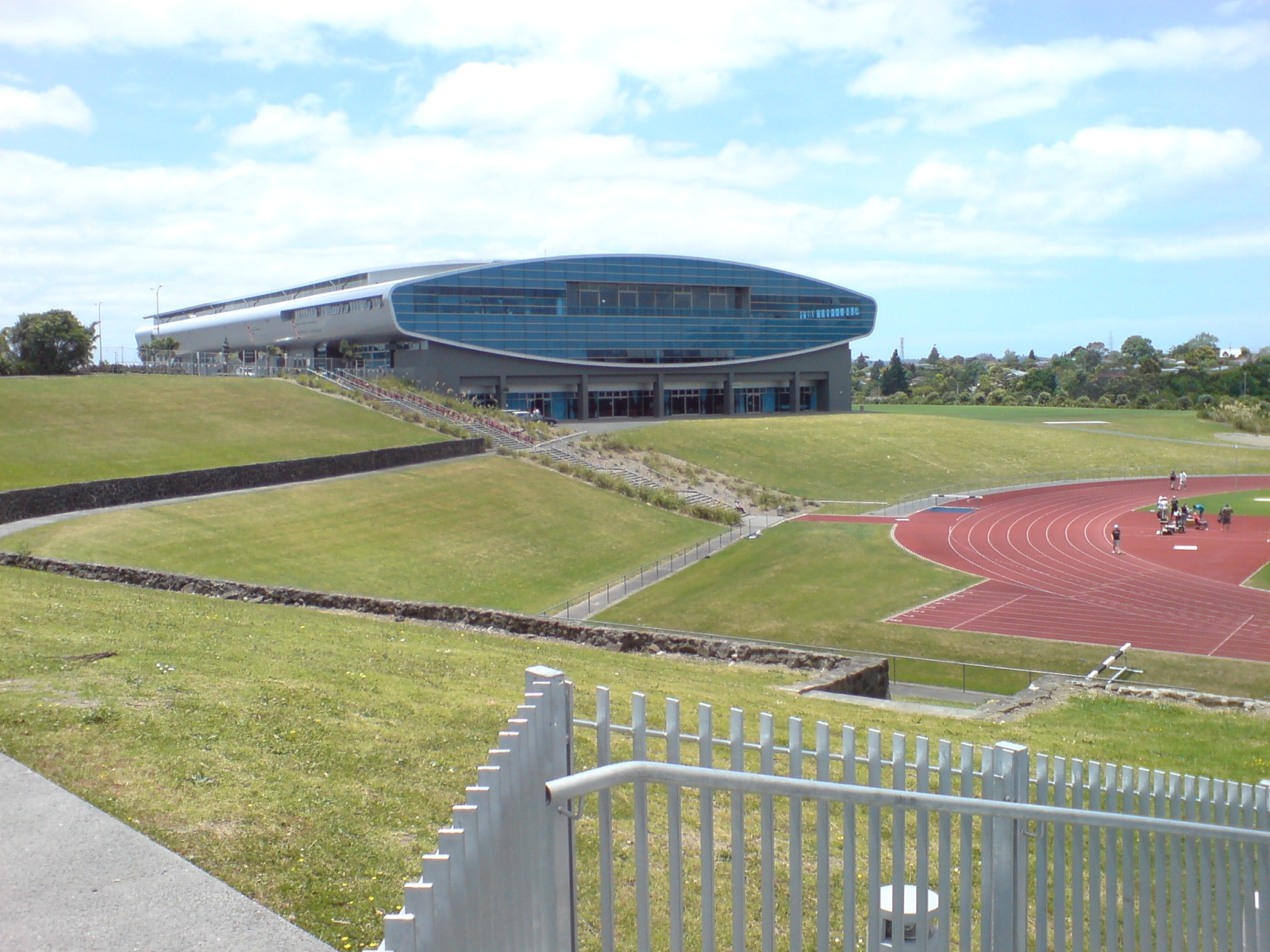
The Trusts Arena, a multi-purpose stadium in West Auckland

West Auckland is home to a number of large urban parks, including Parrs Park, Moire Park, Henderson Park, Tui Glen Reserve and Olympic Park. Many professional and amateur sports teams are based in West Auckland, including: the Waitakere Cricket Club; rugby league teams Glenora Bears, the Waitemata Seagulls and Te Atatu Roosters; an ice hockey team, the West Auckland Admirals; and a number of association football teams, including Bay Olympic who as of 2022 play in the Northern League.

The Trusts Arena, a multi-purpose stadium in Henderson, regularly hosts large-scale sporting events and concerts. The Avondale Racecourse is both a venue for Thoroughbred racing, and the home of the Avondale Sunday Markets, one of the largest regular markets in New Zealand. Other large amenities in West Auckland include the Paradice Ice Skating rink in Avondale, West Wave Pool and Leisure Centre in Henderson, and the Titirangi Golf Club. In the 1980s, Te Atatū Peninsula was the site of Footrot Flats Fun Park, a large-scale amusement park that closed in 1989.

LynnMall, the first American-style shopping centre in New Zealand, opened in 1963. Other major shopping areas in West Auckland include the NorthWest Shopping Centre in Westgate, and WestCity Waitakere in Henderson. The first Costco store in New Zealand opened at Westgate in 2022.

== Notable people ==
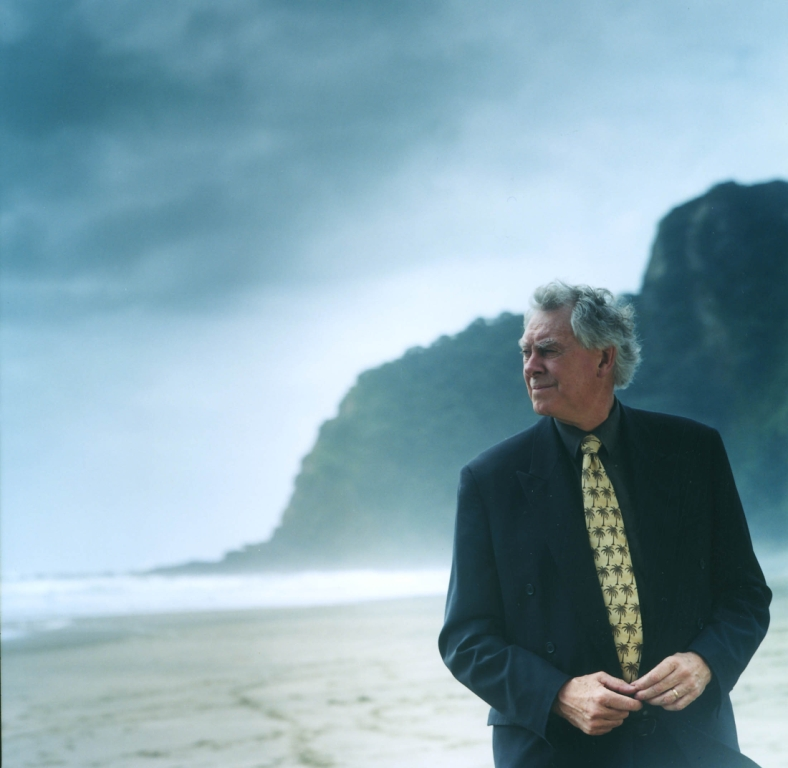
Former mayor of Waitakere City Bob Harvey, photographed at Karekare

- Edith Amituanai – Samoan New Zealand contemporary artist based in Rānui
- Paula Bennett – deputy prime minister from 2016 to 2017
- Simon Bridges – leader of the opposition from 2018 to 2020, who grew up in Te Atatū
- Don Buck – Portuguese New Zealand gumdigger in the early 19th century
- Maurice Gee – author
- Ewen Gilmour – comedian
- Bob Harvey – mayor of Waitakere City from 1992 to 2010
- Oscar Kightley – Samoan New Zealand actor and comedian
- Cindy Kiro – public health academic, and governor-general since 2021
- Colin McCahon – artist who lived in Titirangi in the 1950s
- Rose McIver – actress who grew up in Titirangi
- Paul Radisich – Croatian New Zealand racing driver
- Ian Scott – artist
- Maurice Shadbolt – author
- Va'aiga Tuigamala – Samoan New Zealand rugby union and rugby league player
- Karen Walker – fashion designer

== Local government ==
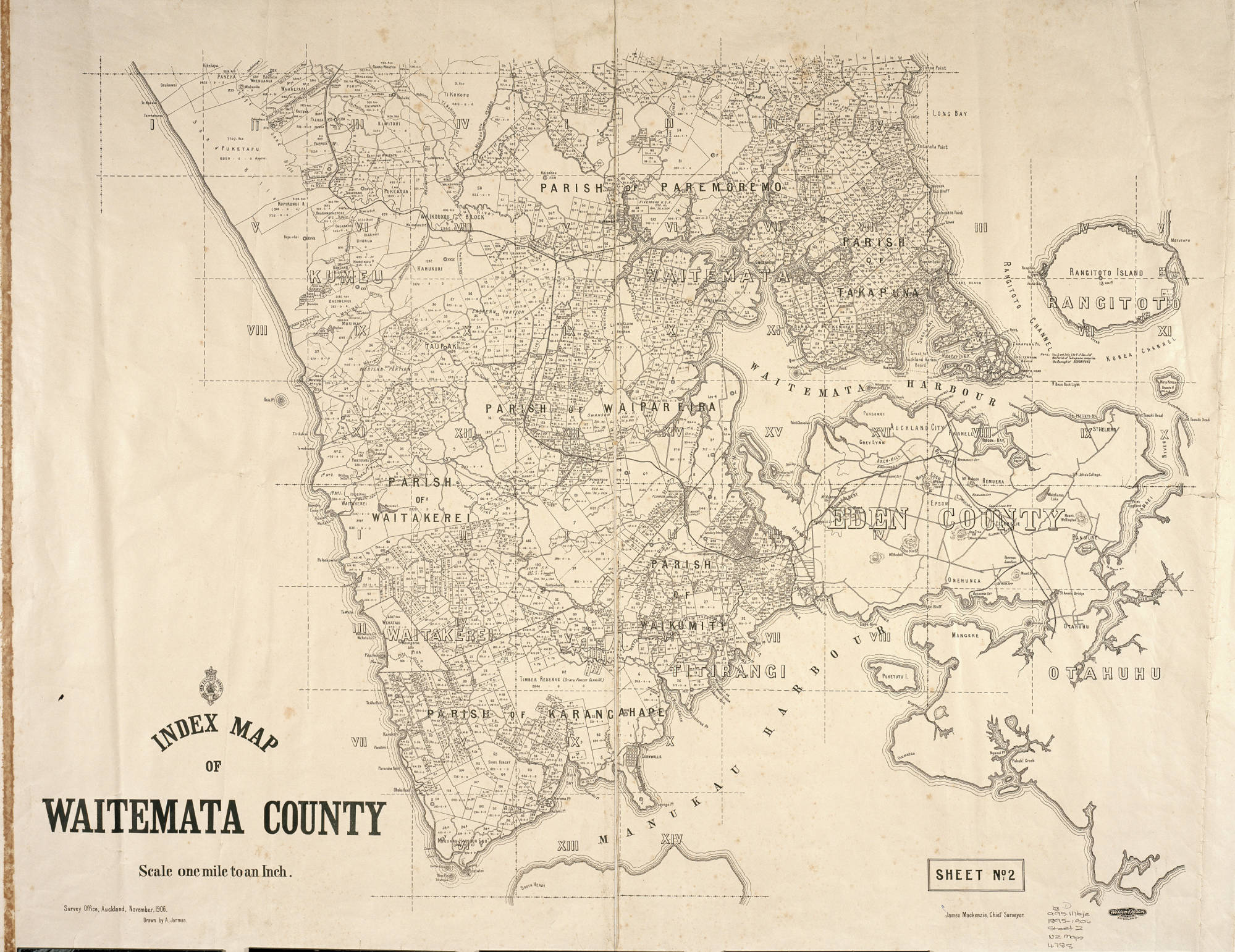
The Waitemata County in 1906

Road boards were the first local government in West Auckland, established across the Auckland Province in the 1860s due to a lack of central government funding for road improvements. In West Auckland, some of these bodies included the Whau Highway Board, the Titirangi Road Board, Waikumete Road Board, Waipareira Road Board and the Waitakere East, South and West Road Boards. In 1876, the Waitemata County was established as the local government of West Auckland, the North Shore and Rodney, becoming one of the largest counties ever created in New Zealand. In 1881, the Town District Act allowed communities of more than 50 households to amalgamate into a town district. Large town districts were able to form boroughs, which had their own councils and a greater lending power. Between 1886 and 1954, nine boroughs split from the county as Auckland began to develop, primarily on the North Shore. In West Auckland, the first borough to form was New Lynn in 1929, followed by Henderson in 1946, Helensville in 1947 and Glen Eden in 1953.

On 1 August 1974, the western area of Waitemata County amalgamated to form the Waitemata City, which included Titirangi, Te Atatū, Lincoln and Waitākere, without the boroughs of New Lynn, Henderson and Glen Eden. Henderson Borough refused to amalgamate into the city, preferring to retain its unique identity, while the New Lynn and Glen Eden borough councils were interested but were unable to meet the deadline for the merger. Tim Shadbolt, later known as the mayor of Invercargill, was the longest serving mayor of Waitemata City (1983–1989).

With the 1989 local government reforms, the Waitemata City merged with the New Lynn, Glen Eden and Henderson boroughs to form the Waitakere City. In the early years of the city's existence, the Rosebank Peninsula was proposed to be added to the city, however this was opposed by mayor Assid Corban. From 1992 to 2010, Bob Harvey served as the mayor of Waitakere City.

On 1 November 2010, Waitakere City was merged with the surrounding metropolitan and rural areas of Auckland to form a single Auckland Council unitary authority. Within the new system, West Auckland was primarily split into three areas which elect a local board: Henderson-Massey, the Waitākere Ranges and Whau. The Whau local board area includes the suburbs of Avondale, New Windsor and Rosebank; areas to the east of the Whau River formerly administered as a part of Auckland City. Northern West Auckland suburbs such as Whenuapai and Hobsonville, formerly administered by the Waitakere City, became a part of the Upper Harbour local board area, which also covers Albany and much of the North Shore. North-western towns such as Riverhead, Kumeū and Huapai became a part of the Rodney local board area.

In addition to local boards, a number of councillors represent West Auckland on the Auckland Council. Voters in the Henderson-Massey and Waitākere Ranges areas vote for two councillors as a part of the Waitākere ward, while people in the Whau local board area vote for a single Whau ward councillor. Upper Harbour residents vote for two Albany ward councillors, while Rodney residents vote for one councillor to represent the Rodney ward.

== Bibliography ==
- Bloomfield, G.T. (1973). The Evolution of Local Government Areas in Metropolitan Auckland, 1840–1971. Auckland University Press, Oxford University Press. ISBN 0-19-647714-X.
- Cranwell-Smith, Lucy (2006). "Rain Forest of the Waitakeres". In Harvey, Bruce; Harvey, Trixie (eds.). Waitakere Ranges: Ranges of Inspiration, Nature, History, Culture. Waitakere Ranges Protection Society. ISBN 978-0-476-00520-4.
- Devaliant, Judith (2009). "History Lessons". In Macdonald, Finlay; Kerr, Ruth (eds.). West: The History of Waitakere. Random House. ISBN 9781869790080.
- Diamond, John T. (1992). "The Brick and Pottery Industry in the Western Districts". In Northcote-Bade, James (ed.). West Auckland Remembers, Volume 2. West Auckland Historical Society. ISBN 0-473-01587-0.
- Diamond, John T.; Hayward, Bruce W. (1979). The Māori history and legends of the Waitākere Ranges. The Lodestar Press. ISBN 9781877431210.
- Diamond, John T.; Hayward, Bruce W. (1990). "Prehistoric Sites in West Auckland". In Northcote-Bade, James (ed.). West Auckland Remembers, Volume 1. West Auckland Historical Society. pp. 33–41. ISBN 0-473-00983-8.
- Dickey, Hugh (2020). Whau Now, Whau Then. Blockhouse Bay Historical Society. ISBN 978-0-473-54013-5.
- Esler, Alan (2006). "Forest Zones". In Harvey, Bruce; Harvey, Trixie (eds.). Waitakere Ranges: Ranges of Inspiration, Nature, History, Culture. Waitakere Ranges Protection Society. ISBN 978-0-476-00520-4.
- Flude, Anthony G. (2008). Henderson's Mill: a History of Henderson 1849-1939. West Auckland Historical Society. ISBN 9781877431210.
- Grant, Simon (2009). "Call of the Wild". In Macdonald, Finlay; Kerr, Ruth (eds.). West: The History of Waitakere. Random House. pp. 305–322. ISBN 9781869790080.
- Harvey, Bruce; Harvey, Trixie (2009). "That Noble Sheet of Water". In Macdonald, Finlay; Kerr, Ruth (eds.). West: The History of Waitakere. Random House. pp. 87–104. ISBN 9781869790080.
- Hatch, J. D. (2006). "Native Orchids". In Harvey, Bruce; Harvey, Trixie (eds.). Waitakere Ranges: Ranges of Inspiration, Nature, History, Culture. Waitakere Ranges Protection Society. ISBN 978-0-476-00520-4.
- Hayward, Bruce W. (1989). Kauri Gum and the Gumdiggers. The Bush Press. ISBN 0-908608-39-X.
- Hayward, Bruce W. (2009). "Land, Sea and Sky". In Macdonald, Finlay; Kerr, Ruth (eds.). West: The History of Waitakere. Random House. pp. 7–22. ISBN 9781869790080.
- Hayward, Bruce W. (2017). Out of the Ocean, Into the Fire. Geoscience Society of New Zealand. ISBN 978-0-473-39596-4.
- Ingram, John (2011). "Steel from Ironsand". In La Roche, John (ed.). Evolving Auckland: The City's Engineering Heritage. Wily Publications. pp. 245–261. ISBN 9781927167038.
- Jones, Sandra (2006). "Uncommon Trees and Shrubs of the Waitakeres". In Harvey, Bruce; Harvey, Trixie (eds.). Waitakere Ranges: Ranges of Inspiration, Nature, History, Culture. Waitakere Ranges Protection Society. ISBN 978-0-476-00520-4.
- Lancaster, Mike; La Roche, John (2011). "Auckland Motorways". In La Roche, John (ed.). Evolving Auckland: The City's Engineering Heritage. Wily Publications. ISBN 9781927167038.
- La Roche, John (2011). "Auckland's Water Supply". In La Roche, John (ed.). Evolving Auckland: The City's Engineering Heritage. Wily Publications. ISBN 9781927167038.
- Logan, Innes (2009). "Game On". In Macdonald, Finlay; Kerr, Ruth (eds.). West: The History of Waitakere. Random House. ISBN 9781869790080.
- Luxton, David (2006). "Timber, Clay and Gum". In Harvey, Bruce; Harvey, Trixie (eds.). Waitakere Ranges: Ranges of Inspiration, Nature, History, Culture. Waitakere Ranges Protection Society. pp. 270–282. ISBN 978-0-476-00520-4.
- Moon, Paul (2009). "Taking Care of Business". In Macdonald, Finlay; Kerr, Ruth (eds.). West: The History of Waitakere. Random House. pp. 119–140. ISBN 9781869790080.
- Murdoch, Graeme (1990). "Nga Tohu o Waitakere: the Maori Place Names of the Waitakere River Valley and its Environs; their Background History and an Explanation of their Meaning". In Northcote-Bade, James (ed.). West Auckland Remembers, Volume 1. West Auckland Historical Society. pp. 9–32. ISBN 0-473-00983-8.
- Paterson, Malcolm (2009). "Ko Ngā Kurī Purepure o Tāmaki, e Kore e Ngari i te Pō". In Macdonald, Finlay; Kerr, Ruth (eds.). West: The History of Waitakere. Random House. pp. 49–62. ISBN 9781869790080.
- Reidy, Jade (2009). "How the West Was Run". In Macdonald, Finlay; Kerr, Ruth (eds.). West: The History of Waitakere. Random House. pp. 237–256. ISBN 9781869790080.
- Skelton, Carolyn (2016). A Brief History of New Lynn: A West Auckland suburb. Auckland Libraries West Auckland Research Centre, Whau Local Board.
- Stewart, Keith (2009). "Into the West". In Macdonald, Finlay; Kerr, Ruth (eds.). West: The History of Waitakere. Random House. pp. 105–118. ISBN 9781869790080.
- Stone, R. C. J. (2001). From Tamaki-makau-rau to Auckland. Auckland University Press. ISBN 1869402596.
- Taua, Te Warena (2009). "He Kohikohinga Kōrero mō Hikurangi". In Macdonald, Finlay; Kerr, Ruth (eds.). West: The History of Waitakere. Random House. pp. 23–48. ISBN 9781869790080.
- Vela, Pauline, ed. (1989). In Those Days: An Oral History of Glen Eden. Glen Eden Borough Council. ISBN 0-473-00862-9.
