= Ark in the Park =

Ark in the Park may refer to:

- Ark in the Park (conservation project), an open sanctuary and conservation project in the Waitākere Ranges near Auckland, New Zealand
- Ark in the Park, segment of the American television show Ray Rayner and His Friends by Ray Rayner
- Ark in the Park, a 1994 children's book by Wendy Orr
- The Ark in the Park: The Zoo in the Nineteenth Century, a 1976 book by Wilfrid Jasper Walter Blunt
- The Ark in the Park: The Story of Lincoln Park Zoo, a 2003 book by Mark Rosenthal, Carol Tauber, and Edward Uhlir
