= Auckland Mako =

Ice hockey team in Auckland, New Zealand

- City: Auckland, New Zealand
- League: New Zealand Ice Hockey League; 2021 – present
- Founded: 2021
- Home arena: Paradice Avondale & Paradice Botany Downs (capacity: 500 & 400)
- Colours: Grey, light grey, black, white
- Head coach: (Canada) Cameron Stephen
- Website: www.aucklandmako.co.nz

The Auckland Mako are an ice hockey team in Auckland, New Zealand, that plays in the New Zealand Ice Hockey League, the top tier of the sport in New Zealand. The team is based in Auckland and play their home games at both Paradice Avondale and Paradice Botany Downs, alternating between the two.

== History ==
Founded in 2021, the Auckland Mako are the sixth team to join the New Zealand Ice Hockey League, and the first to do so since the Dunedin Thunder joined the four foundation clubs in 2008 and will begin play in the 2021–22 season. The Mako will split their home games between Auckland's two ice rinks in Avondale and Botany Downs, and will travel around the country to play away games against NZIHL opposition. The team's roster will mainly be made up of players under the age of 23, with additional veteran 'mentor' players to provide leadership, in order to help provide younger players with a pathway into the NZIHL.

On February 26, 2021, the Mako announced that they would have two Co-Head Coaches, Andreas Kaißer & A.J. Spiller, both of whom have former NZIHL experience. Spiller was also announced to be one of the nine initial mentor players.

== Team ==
The Mako are a unique team in that they do not have any contracted players, rather they are made up primarily of U-23 players contracted to other NZIHL teams. In the event that the Mako play against the players contracted team, the player will play for their contracted team and not the Mako. In addition to the U-23 players, there will be a smaller group of older players to provide leadership. These players will also be contracted to other NZIHL teams and will play on the same terms as the U-23 players. Due to the rotational nature of the team's roster, and the fact that they will be playing fewer games than the other NZIHL teams, Mako games will not count towards NZIHL standings, and they will be not be eligible for the play-offs, however, individual player stats will be tracked.
