= 2005 NZIHL season =

The following is the 2005 New Zealand Ice Hockey League season standings, results, leading scorers and awards.

== 2005 NZIHL standings ==
Position	Team	GP	W	L	T	BP	PTS	GF	GA
1	Southern Stampede	6	4	0	2	0	16	32	21
2	West Auckland Admirals	6	2	0	4	0	14	31	22
3	South Auckland Swarm	6	2	1	2	1	11	21	20
4	Canterbury Red Devils	6	0	6	0	2	2	17	38

W = Main Round Win = 3 points
L = Main Round Loss
T = Main Round Tie = 2 points
BP = Bonus Point

== 2005 season results ==
Round 1 - Botany Downs

- June 3, 2005 - West Auckland Admirals 5 v Canterbury Red Devils 2
- June 4, 2005 - South Auckland Swarm 5 v Canterbury Red Devils 1
- June 5, 2005 - South Auckland Swarm 4 v West Auckland Admirals 4

Round 2 - Queenstown

- July 8, 2005 - Southern Stampede 6 v South Auckland Swarm 5
- July 9, 2005 - Canterbury Red Devils 2 v South Auckland Swarm 3
- July 10, 2005 - Southern Stampede 7 v Canterbury Red Devils 5

Round 3 - Avondale

- August 5, 2005 - West Auckland Admirals 2 v Southern Stampede 2
- August 6, 2005 - South Auckland Swarm 1 v Southern Stampede 4
- August 7, 2005 - West Auckland Admirals 3 v South Auckland Swarm 3

Round 4 - Christchurch

- August 19, 2005 - Canterbury Red Devils 5 v West Auckland Admirals 11
- August 20, 2005 - Canterbury Red Devils 2 v Southern Stampede 7
- August 21, 2005 - Southern Stampede 6 v West Auckland Admirals 6

Finals - Dunedin

- September 16, 2005 - Southern Stampede 2 v West Auckland Admirals 1
- September 17, 2005 - Southern Stampede 6 v West Auckland Admirals 3

2005 NZIHL Champion - Southern Stampede

== 2005 leading scorers ==
Player	Team	GP	G	A	P
Simon Glass	Southern Stampede	6	7	7	14
Ola Lundell	West Auckland Admirals	6	6	7	13
Loren Nowland	Southern Stampede	6	7	4	11
Jeff Bonazzo	West Auckland Admirals	6	6	5	11
Daniel Smith	West Auckland Admirals	6	5	5	10

== 2005 NZIHL awards ==
- MVP of Canterbury Red Devils - Troy Crittenden
- MVP of South Auckland Swarm - Jon Duvale
- MVP of Southern Stampede - Simon Glass
- MVP of West Auckland Admirals - Jeff Bonazzo
- Best Defenceman - BJ Laing - Southern Stampede
- Top Goaltender - Zak Nothling - South Auckland Swarm
- Top Points Scorer - Simon Glass - Southern Stampede
- League MVP - Simon Glass - Southern Stampede
- Finals MVP - Steven Reid - Southern Stampede
