= Don Buck =

Portuguese immigrant in New Zealand (died 1917)

- Photo by Khaleel A. Corban likely depicting Don Buck
- Born: Francisco Rodrigues Figueira; 1869 or 1870; Madeira, Portugal
- Died: August 5, 1917; Ponsonby, New Zealand
- Occupation(s): Gumdigger, pioneer, horse breeder, store owner

Don Buck (real name Francisco Rodrigues Figueira or Randoff Sanfrisco Figuero) (died 5 August 1917) was a Portuguese immigrant in New Zealand in the late nineteenth and early twentieth century. He was known for working newly released prisoners as gum diggers and trading the gum for a profit.

== Biography ==
Figueira was born circa 1869/1870, in Madeira, Portugal. Figueira travelled to South Africa in his youth, where he made money. In 1892 at the age of 22, he travelled to New Zealand aboard a trading schooner, after receiving a small amount of money from his father. The local Aucklanders, unable to pronounce his name, decided to call him Don Buck. He made several attempts to establish himself as a businessman in Auckland, however none were successful and by 1899 he had lost most of his funds.

The Long Depression of the latter 19th century caused many out-of-work residents of New Zealand to find employment as kauri gum diggers, and inspired Figueira to move to West Auckland in search of the product. Figueira arrived in Henderson, initially setting up as a store owner in Henderson by at least 1898, before setting up the gum digging camp and farming land at Birdwood (now known as Massey).

Figueira established his gum digger's camp in Birdwood adjacent to the Swanson Stream, on a property of about 250 acres. By 1900, Figueira had developed an arrangement with the Police Magistrates of the Auckland Law Courts, allowing petty criminals the option of either spending two weeks in the Mount Eden Prison, or two weeks at his gum digging camp. The magistrate agreed to this arrangement, due to the severely limited space available for prisoners at Mount Eden. The camp also became home for many who were banished from Auckland, as the courts would provide a train ticket to Henderson. Figueira himself never dug gum, instead focusing on selling gum, running the store, horse breeding, and farming goats, pigs and sheep.

Convicts were collected every two weeks by Figueira, and were told to build themselves a shack upon arriving at the camp. Figueira would provide rental accommodation and hirable spades for gum digging. Figueira controlled the camp's profits, as the diggers were obliged to sell kauri gum to him and buy groceries from him. Gum diggers would roam across West Auckland to collect gum, as there were few fences or gates.

Feared by many of the residents of Henderson and Auckland, due to his stature, attire and association with prisoners, Figueira made efforts to keep cordial relationships with his neighbours. He apologised to landowners when gum diggers encroached on their land, or when diggers robbed residents of the area. Figueira provided support for residents after a major fire in the Waitākere Ranges. He was well known by Auckland residents for his appearances at Kingsland, where every few weeks crowds would gather to watch him as he bought bulk supplies.

The camp was seen as disreputable, especially after 1905, when its reputation for riotous drinking and fights intensified after sherry and wine from local vineyards was more easily available. Figueira did not sell alcohol at the camp, however residents were able to purchase liquor from the Henderson township. Many women vagrants, including Tiger Lil, China Nell and Screaming Annie, worked at the camp alongside the men, a fact that scandalised local residents.

In November 1912, a digger, William Henry "Harry" Whiteside, was discovered dead in the fireplace of one of the shacks at the camp, by camp resident Barbara Craiga. The coroner ruled that the death was due to intoxication after a two-day drinking spree that had been in progress at the camp. The case caused public outcry, and calls for the camp to be disestablished. Gum digging became less profitable over time as resources dwindled and the surrounding area was subdivided, however the camp itself survived as a community. In 1913, Figueira finally formalised the title to the lands with a settlers grant. By his final years, Figuiera was described as a viticulturalist.

As the members of the camp left, his health deteriorated. Figueira suffered from heart disease from around 1913/1914, and from dropsy in 1917. Later in 1917, Figueira had a heart attack in his house at Birdwood, dying a few days later on 5 August 1917, at Severn Hospital in Ponsonby. Figueira was buried at Waikumete Cemetery, and his lands were sold by public trust, left to his siblings and cousin in Madeira.

During his lifetime, Figueira was seen as a polarising figure, either as a humanitarian or as an opportunist, and his camp was seen as a blight in the region. Overtime, Figueira became a folk history figure to Aucklanders. Local researcher and schoolteacher Marianne Simpkins located Figueira's grave, and, noting that the grave had been left unpaid, fundraised to cover the costs and to have a memorial plaque to note the previously unmarked location in 1972. In 2011, the plaque was replaced with a headstone.

== Physical description ==
Don Buck was known for his distinctive look, and was a tall, slim man with dark features and a moustache. He typically wore a broad-brimmed hat, black calf-length velvet-trimmed jacket, a colourful waistcoat, and high leather boots. He carried a pistol around his neck, and was often seen with his large black stallion. He spoke accented English, and numerous other languages.

== Commemoration ==
Don Buck is commemorated in the names of Don Buck Road, Don Buck Primary School in Massey, New Zealand. The approximate location of the camp became Don Buck Corner, a neighbourhood park. The Huruhuru Creek (south-western Te Wai-o-Pareira / Henderson Creek) is known locally as Don Buck Creek from Don Buck Road down to where the Northwestern Motorway crosses it.

A memorial was unveiled at Don Buck Corner in Massey, near the site of the camp, in August 1978. The Massey Birdwood Settlers' Association hall commemorated Don Buck's camp with a mural designed by artist Mandy Patmore.

== See also ==
- Portuguese New Zealander
