= Portuguese Australians =

Portuguese Australians Luso-australianos

Total population
- 61,885 (2016)

Regions with significant populations
- Sydney, Perth, Melbourne

Languages
- Australian English; Portuguese; Portuguese Creole

Religion
- Roman Catholicism; (Majority) Protestantism; Judaism; (Minority)

Related ethnic groups
- Portuguese; Portuguese New Zealanders; Portuguese Canadians; Portuguese Brazilians; Portuguese Americans; Portuguese Argentine

Portuguese Australians refers to Australians of Portuguese descent or Portuguese-born people living in Australia.

Despite their rather modest number compared to the Greek and Italian communities, Portuguese Australians form a very organised, self-conscious and active community in many fields of Australian life. With a population spread over many parts of the continent, sporting teams, social clubs, radio shows, newspapers, outdoor cultural festivals, culinary feasts, and even a traditional ethnic neighbourhood, the ever-growing Portuguese Australians form roughly 0.26% of Australia's population in 2016. The biggest Portuguese Australian community is in Petersham, Sydney: but there are other communities around Australia such as Melbourne, Wollongong, Newcastle and Perth. There are also communities present, to a lesser extent, in Perth, Brisbane, Adelaide, Canberra, and Darwin. At the time of the 2016 census, there were 61,885 Portuguese migrants and Australians with Portuguese heritage living in Australia.

Portuguese cuisine has also made its way into mainstream Australian society, with the fast expansion and establishment of restaurant and fast food outlets such as "Nando's", "Oporto" and "Ogalo" proving extremely successful. The Portuguese "pastel de nata" is a very popular delicacy in Australia and is commonly found throughout the country.

One of the most high-visibility moments for the Portuguese community was in 2005, when António Milhinhos, a shopkeeper from Darwin, was awarded the Senior Australian of the Year Award for his outstanding charity works and continuous catastrophe relief since 1983.

== History ==
=== In New South Wales ===
On account of its economic situation from the mid-19th century to the 1980s, Portugal experienced above-average levels of emigration, with citizens migrating to its colonies or to richer countries in Europe, Australasia and the Americas. A wave of post-war immigrants migrated from Europe to Sydney, in particular the Portuguese, who settled in the inner-city areas of Petersham (sometimes considered Australia's largest Portuguese enclave) and Surry Hills. On account of its economic situation from the mid-19th century to the 1980s, Portugal experienced above-average levels of emigration, with citizens migrating to its colonies or to richer countries in Europe, Australasia and the Americas.

=== In Victoria ===
Portugal’s links with Australia may extend as far back as the sixteenth century, predating Captain Cook's voyage to Australia by 250 years. Some evidence suggests that Portuguese explorers were the first Europeans to visit Australia.

Three hundred years later, a few Portuguese were among the earliest settlers in Australia. Emanuel and Ana Serrão and their infant daughter arrived in Sydney in 1824, and moved to Warrnambool with their family in 1852. Few followed, and by 1901 only 86 Victorians were Portugal-born. Males made up 90% of the community.

The Portugal-born population in Victoria declined in the early twentieth century, and by 1933, only 12 were recorded in the census.

While the post-war migration boom had little effect on the Portuguese population of Victoria, the late 1960s saw the beginning of a dramatic increase in immigration. After the Portuguese colonial wars in Angola and Mozambique ended in 1974, and the former Portuguese colony of East Timor was invaded by Indonesian troops in 1975, more ethnic Portuguese immigrants settled in Victoria. The number of immigrants from Portugal also increased, from 131 in 1966 to 2,335 in 1986.

By 2016, 2,727 Portugal-born migrants were living in Victoria. The Portuguese community in Victoria today also includes people from the former Portuguese colonies of Macau, East Timor, Cape Verde, Mozambique, Angola, Goa and Brazil.

Members of the Portugal-born community today are predominantly employed as tradespeople and workers within the manufacturing and construction industries. Almost three-quarters still speak Portuguese at home.

The community is supported by organizations including the Portuguese Community Council of Australia, which serves as an umbrella organization for all Portuguese people in Australia. Portuguese language radio programs, language classes and sporting clubs help maintain the community in Victoria. Events such as performances by Madeira Folk Dancing provide an opportunity for the wider community to appreciate the rich, vibrant Portuguese culture.

=== In Western Australia ===
Portuguese migrants from the islands of Madeira settled in Fremantle in Western Australia in the 1950s and established a fishing community which, by the mid-1980s, had grown to about 6,000 people, including their descendants. Since then, Perth and Western Australia in general have been a frequent destination for Portuguese students and skilled labor, and although no mass-migration has occurred, the Portuguese population is still prevalent in the state. John Da Silva, the founder and owner of Bell-Vista vegetables, one of Western Australia's biggest vegetable provider migrated to Fremantle in the Portuguese migrant wave to that area in the 1960s.

== Portuguese Australians ==
Name	Birth and Death	Occupation	Notes
Isaac de Gois	1984–	Rugby league player	Portuguese descent
Diogo Ferreira	1989–	Football (soccer) player	Portuguese descent
Jessica Gomes	1985–	Model	Portuguese descent
Moisés Henriques	1987–	Cricket player	Portuguese-born, Portuguese descent
Stephanie Jacobsen	1980–	Actress	Portuguese descent
Charles Kingston	1850–1908	Politician	Portuguese descent
Maria Korp	1955-2005	Murder victim	Portuguese descent
Madison de Rozario	1993–	Paralympic athlete	Portuguese descent
Nicole da Silva	1981–	Actress	Portuguese descent
Daniel De Silva	1997-	Footballer	Portuguese descent
Guy Sebastian	1981 -	Singer	Portuguese descent
Joel Adams (Né Gonçalves)	1996 -	Singer	Portuguese descent
James Sorensen	1986 -	Model/Actor	Portuguese descent
Naomi Sequeira	1994 -	Actress/ Singer	Portuguese descent
Kate DeAraugo	1985 -	Singer	Portuguese descent
David Malouf	1934 -	Writer	Portuguese-jewish descent
Lisa De Vanna	1984 -	Footballer	Portuguese descent
Junie Morosi	1933 -	Businesswoman	Portuguese descent
Josh Mansour	1990 -	Rugby league player	Portuguese descent
Jonathan Guerreiro	1991 -	Ice dancer	Portuguese descent
Sophie Masson	1959 -	Writer	Portuguese descent
Priya Serrao	1992 -	Miss Universe Australia 2019	Portuguese descent
Wilson Da Silva	?	Science journalist, writer	Brazilian-born, Portuguese descent
Irina Dunn	1948 -	Politician	Portuguese descent
Andrew Coelho	1987 -	Tennis player	Portuguese descent
Danny Fulalo	1994 -	Rugby league player	Portuguese descent
Corey Gameiro	1993 -	Footballer	Portuguese descent
Ian Goodenough	1975 -	Politician	Portuguese descent
Diana da Costa Neves	1987 -	Basketball player.	Portuguese descent
David Pereira	1953 -	Classical cellist	Portuguese descent
Paulo Retre	1993 -	Footballer	Portuguese descent
Lyndsey Rodrigues	1981 -	TV host, actress	Portuguese descent
Chris Sebastian	1988 -	Singer/Songwriter	Portuguese descent
Ivo Dos Santos	1985 -	Olympic judoka	Portuguese-born, Portuguese descent
R. A. de Castro Basto	1898-1980	Doctor	Portuguese descent

== See also ==
- Brazilian Australians
- European Australians
- Europeans in Oceania
- Immigration to Australia
- Petersham, New South Wales
- Portuguese in France
- Portuguese New Zealanders
- Portuguese in the United Kingdom
- Portuguese people
- Portuguese in Asia and Oceania
- Theory of the Portuguese discovery of Australia
