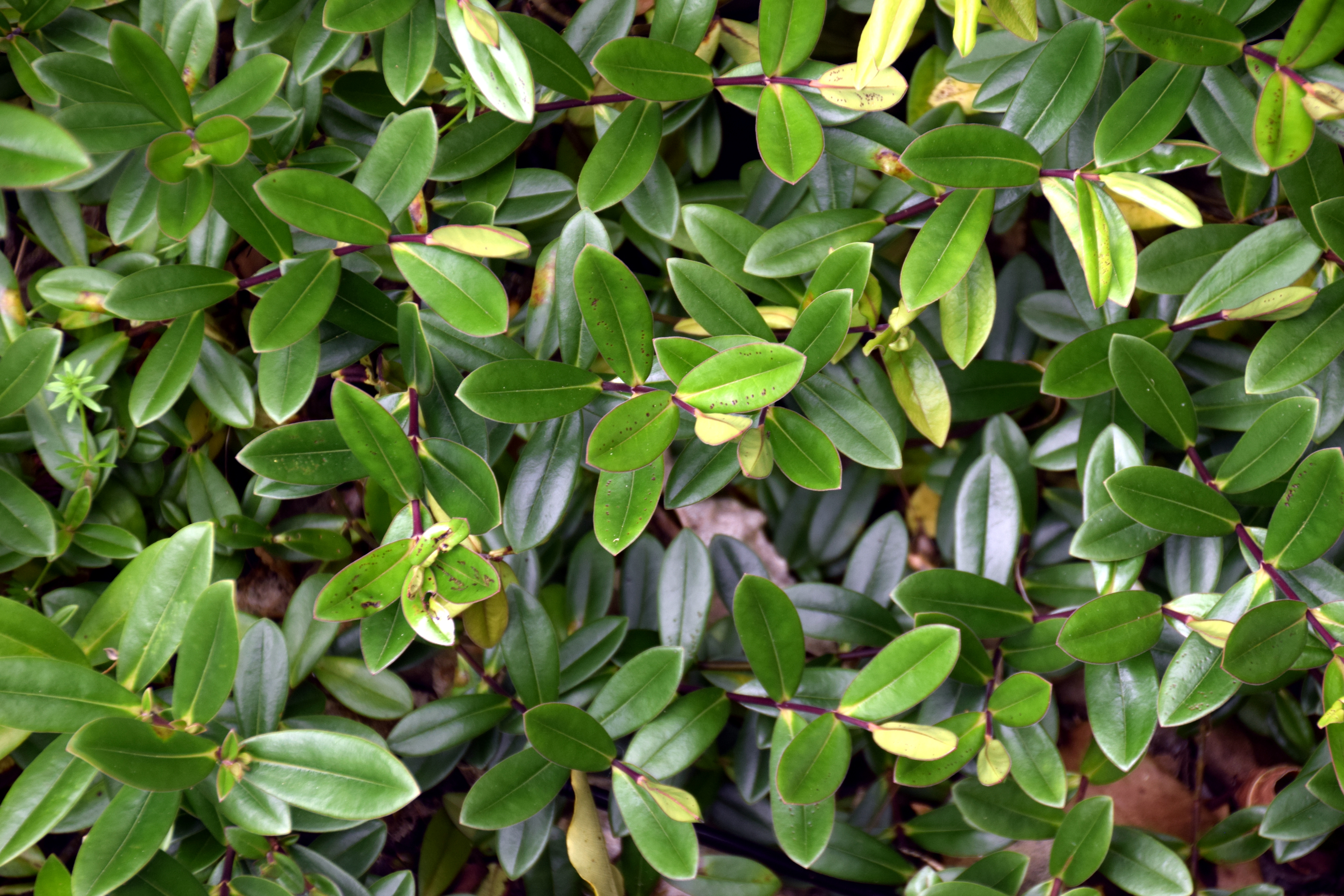

Scientific classification
- Kingdom: Plantae
- Clade: Tracheophytes
- Clade: Angiosperms
- Clade: Eudicots
- Clade: Asterids
- Order: Lamiales
- Family: Plantaginaceae
- Genus: Veronica
- Section: Veronica sect. Hebe
- Species: V. obtusata

Binomial name
- Veronica obtusata Cheeseman, 1916

Synonyms
- Hebe obtusata; Veronica macroura var. dubia

= Veronica obtusata =

Species of flowering plant in the plantain family

Veronica obtusata, the northern hebe, is a flowering plant belonging to the family Plantaginaceae. It is native to northern New Zealand, and was first described by Thomas Cheeseman in 1916.

== Description ==
Veronica obtusata is a sprawling shrub with paired dark green leaves. It looks similar to Veronica bishopiana, however tends to grow smaller and does not share the maroon-green leaves of Veronica bishopiana.

== Taxonomy ==
The plant was first identified as Veronica macroura var. dubia by Thomas Cheeseman in 1916, later recategorised as Hebe obtusata in 1926 by Cockayne & Allan. More recently, the plant was recategorised as a species of Veronica.

== Distribution ==
Veronica bishopiana is naturally distributed in the coastal areas of the Waitākere Ranges of West Auckland, and the Kawhia and Whaingaroa harbours of the western Waikato region. The populations in the Kawhia Harbour are threatened. Veronica obtusata is typically found on steep slopes and banks, on cliff faces and rock stacks.
