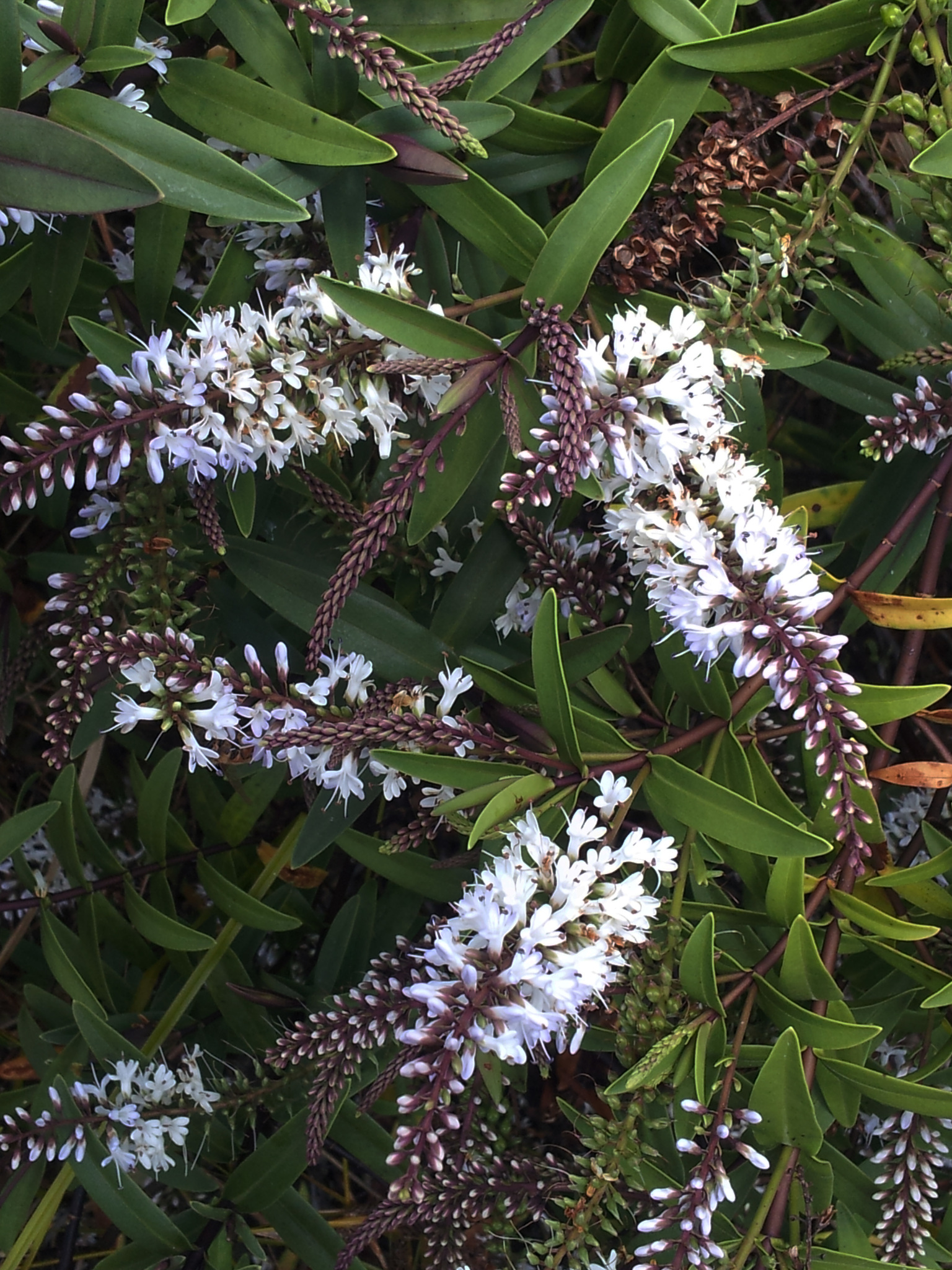

Scientific classification
- Kingdom: Plantae
- Clade: Tracheophytes
- Clade: Angiosperms
- Clade: Eudicots
- Clade: Asterids
- Order: Lamiales
- Family: Plantaginaceae
- Genus: Veronica
- Section: Veronica sect. Hebe
- Species: V. bishopiana

Binomial name
- Veronica bishopiana Petrie
- Known native range

Synonyms
- Veronica × bishopiana; Hebe bishopiana

= Veronica bishopiana =

Species of flowering plant in the plantain family

Veronica bishopiana, the Waitākere rock koromiko, is a flowering plant belonging to the family Plantaginaceae. It is native to West Auckland in New Zealand, and was first described by Donald Petrie in 1926.

== Description ==
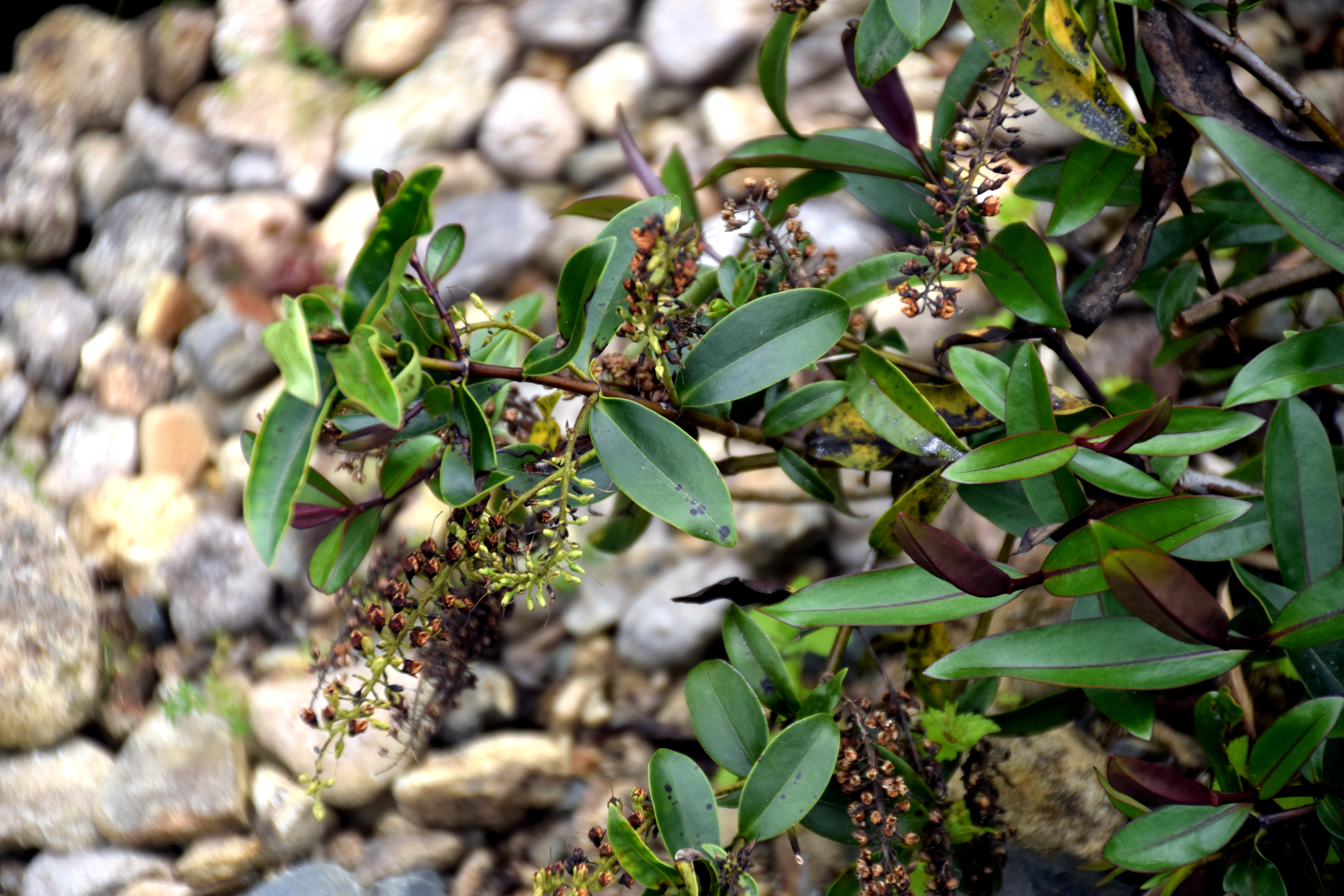
Leaves of Veronica bishopiana growing at the Auckland Botanic Gardens

Veronica bishopiana is a low spreading shrub that grows up to one metre tall. While similar to Veronica obtusata in appearance, Veronica bishopiana tends to be larger, and has distinctive maroon-green leaves. The shrub has white and mauve-coloured flowers, with the mauve colour often only evident in the youngest buds of the plant.

== Taxonomy ==
It was named by Donald Petrie in 1926, first described as a hybrid, Veronica × bishopiana. It was transferred the genus Hebe in 1966 by ED Hatch, but has since been reclassified again as a species of Veronica.

The species was named for Titirangi resident John Joseph Bishop, who first recognised Veronica bishopiana as a distinct species and cultivated it at his home, providing plant material for Petrie to study.

== Distribution ==
Veronica bishopiana is naturally distributed in the Waitakere Ecological District of the Waitākere Ranges of West Auckland. It typically occurs on stream sides, igneous rock outcrops and shaded cliff faces. Since 2007, specimens have also been found in the Tangihua Forest in Northland Region.
