= Portuguese New Zealanders =

Portuguese New Zealanders Luso-Neozelandeses
Total population
- Portuguese; 1,365 New Zealanders; Roughly 0.03% of New Zealand's population

Languages
- Portuguese · New Zealand English; Portuguese Creole

Religion
- Roman Catholicism · Protestantism

Related ethnic groups
- Portuguese · Portuguese Australian · Portuguese Canadian · Portuguese Brazilian · Portuguese American

Portuguese New Zealanders are either Portuguese who migrated to New Zealand, or New Zealanders of Portuguese descent. According to the 2023 New Zealand census, the total population of Portuguese residents, including migrants and their descendants was reported to be approximately 1,746. 54% were born overseas.

On 22 April 2010, Portuguese New Zealanders were recognised by the Office of Ethnic Affairs as an official community of New Zealand, having tied the 70th ribbon to Parliament's mooring stone on the Parliament House Galleria. The Portuguese Embassy in Canberra, Australia is accredited to New Zealand, while there are two honorary Portuguese consulates in New Zealand, one in Wellington and the other in Auckland, both of which operate through the Portuguese Consulate-General in Sydney.

As well as having been recognised as an official community, the Portuguese in New Zealand hold several annual meetings and celebrations such as Portugal Day, and are organised through a friendship association.

== History ==
In the 19th and early 20th centuries there were more Portuguese than Spaniards in New Zealand. This was probably a reflection in part of the close commercial links between Portugal and England. Portuguese were recorded amongst New Zealand's early colonists, one Ngāti Kahungunu family has a Portuguese whaler in its whakapapa (genealogical chart), and Auckland singer Bill Worsfold claims to be the descendant of this whaler, and wrote a ballad about his tough life and arrival in New Zealand. Other arrivals included António Rodrigues, who migrated from the island of Madeira with his wife in the 19th century and eventually settled in Akaroa, where he built the "Madeira Pub Hotel", which is still in activity. Another early settler was Francisco Rodrigues Figueira, also from Madeira, who owned a prison labour gum-digger's camp in West Auckland in the late 19th century. Known as "Don Buck", Figueira was a colourful and violent character and he is remembered in such west Auckland placenames as Don Buck Road, Don Buck Primary School, and Don Buck Corner Reserve. In the mid-20th century, Portuguese migration to New Zealand nearly stagnated with only 12 Portugal-born migrants being registered in the 1951 census, but the Portuguese diaspora gained a new momentum in the 1960s, and later after the Carnation Revolution when the number of Portuguese migrants to New Zealand rose even further.

Portuguese-born Dutch photographer Fernando Pereira was the only victim of the sinking of the Rainbow Warrior in the port of Auckland. On 10 July 1985, two French DGSE agents bombed the Rainbow Warrior, Greenpeace's flagship, which was scheduled to depart New Zealand to disrupt nuclear testing in French Polynesia. This was to date the only foreign attack on New Zealand's soil.

Today, the Portuguese are part of an even larger Portuguese-speaking community in New Zealand, that also includes Brazilians, East Timorese, Macanese and Cape Verdeans. Despite constituting 0.03% of New Zealand's population, some 0.22% of New Zealanders speak Portuguese according to the latest census.

== Notable Portuguese New Zealanders ==
Name	Birth and death	Occupation	Notes
Brooke Fraser	1983–	Singer songwriter	Portuguese descent
Bernie Fraser (rugby union)	1953–	Rugby union player	Portuguese descent
Melanie Rodriga	1954–	Film maker, lecturer, author	Portuguese descent
Manoel Santos	1940–2013	Boxer	Portuguese descent
Joseph Musaphia	1935–	Writer, actor	Portuguese descent
Bernie Rao	1978–	Writer, director, producer	Portuguese descent

== See also ==
- European New Zealanders
- Europeans in Oceania
- Immigration to New Zealand
- Portuguese Australians
- Portuguese immigration to Hawaii
- Pākehā
