= Finlay Macdonald (editor) =

New Zealand journalist (born 1961)

Finlay Macdonald (born 1961) is a New Zealand journalist, editor, publisher and broadcaster. He is best known for editing the New Zealand Listener (1998–2003). Macdonald was appointed New Zealand Editor: Politics, Business & Arts of the online media site The Conversation in April 2020. He lives in Auckland with his partner, media executive Carol Hirschfeld. They have two children. His father was the late journalist Iain Macdonald.

== Career ==
Macdonald began his career as a junior reporter for the NZ Listener, later becoming a senior writer, before leaving to pursue a freelance career, during which time he researched and wrote television documentaries and was for two years a regular scriptwriter for TVNZ's long-running drama series Shortland Street.

From 1996 to 1997 Macdonald was a senior writer for Metro magazine, before returning to the Listener as deputy editor under then-editor Paul Little. When Little left, Macdonald was appointed editor, and hired Steve Braunias from Metro as deputy editor.

Macdonald has said that highlights of editing the Listener included driving its coverage of the 9/11 terror attacks and New Zealand's response to the subsequent "War on Terror", and launching the magazine's first website.

Notable writers he commissioned to contribute to the Listener included C.K Stead (an obituary of New Zealand writer Janet Frame), Michael King, Alexander Cockburn and Christopher Hitchens (on the death of Diana, Princess of Wales).

Between 2004 and 2006 he was a commissioning editor for Penguin Books New Zealand. During this time, Macdonald encouraged former New Zealand Prime Minister David Lange to write his memoir, David Lange: My Life. The book's publication coincided with the death of Lange in 2005, and remains a best-seller.

From 2006 to 2010 Macdonald wrote a weekly column for the Sunday Star-Times (which he has compared to writing a Listener editorial); and was also the paper's literary editor.

More recently he has written for North & South magazine, The Spinoff, Radio New Zealand and Newsroom. In 2013 he authored The Life and Art of Lynley Dodd an illustrated retrospective of the New Zealand children's author's work. From 2015 to 2017 he was the New Zealand publisher for HarperCollins where he specialised in non-fiction works, including New Zealand musician Dave McArtney's memoir Gutter Black, Flying Nun Records founder Roger Shepherd's memoir In Love With These Times, and the celebrated New Zealand writer James McNeish's final book, Breaking Ranks.

Macdonald has worked as a documentary producer/reporter or presenter for television series The Good Word (TVNZ 7); Talk Talk (TVNZ 7); NewsBites (Maori Television Service) and The Book Show (TVNZ). As host and moderator he launched the first seasons of the Auckland Museum LATE series of debates and lectures, has been a regular chair at the annual Auckland Writers Festival, and has hosted the University of Auckland's Bright Lights event for distinguished alumni since 2013.

== Education ==
- 1984 Bachelor of Arts (majoring in politics) University of Auckland
- Diploma of Journalism Wellington Polytechnic.

== Awards ==
- 2006 Qantas Media Awards Columnist of the Year
- 1994 Nuffield Press Fellow, Wolfson College, University of Cambridge
