= John La Roche =

New Zealand engineer and author

John La Roche MNZM
- Born: John Charles La Roche; 2 April 1937 (age 88); Howick, New Zealand

John Charles La Roche MNZM (born 2 April 1937) is a New Zealand engineer and author. As an engineer he specialised in design work for water treatment plants and in waste management.

== Biography ==
La Roche was born in Howick, New Zealand. After secondary education at Auckland Grammar School, he studied engineering at the University of Auckland, graduating with a Bachelor of Engineering degree in Civil Engineering in 1962.

== Engineering career ==
After graduation, La Roche worked in London for Ove Arup & Partners, later returning to New Zealand, working on Auckland engineering projects. In 1968, he began working for water treatment company Paterson Candy International, working on plants in Hamilton and New Plymouth. In 1975, La Roche began working at the Auckland Regional Authority, where he designed the region's water treatment plants. La Roche worked in a variety of civil engineering roles related to water supply, particularly at Auckland Regional Authority where he was involved in major expansions of chemical handling equipment and the development of a greatly improved system for mixing flocculation chemicals with the water to be treated. He promoted the use of declining rate filtration as opposed to constant rate filtration as a means to provide additional flow capacity. From 1988, and especially following his retirement in 1992, he and his wife Sue were heavily involved as voluntary administrators of Water for Survival, a charity that provided safe drinking water and basic sanitation to 500,000 people in developing country village communities.

== Awards ==
La Roche was recognised as a Distinguished Alumnus of the University of Auckland in 1999. In 2018 La Roche was recognised for his contributions to the engineering heritage of Auckland with the Centennial Excellence in Engineering Heritage Award. In the New Year Honours list, 2003, La Roche was appointed as a Member of the New Zealand Order of Merit for his services to engineering.

== Selected publications ==
=== Books authored ===
- Lucy Cranwell and John La Roche (2004). Hut and Headland. School of Biological Sciences, the University of Auckland.
- John La Roche, ed. (2011). Evolving Auckland: the city's engineering heritage. Wily Publications, Christchurch.
- John and Sue La Roche (2022). The Pourewa Valley Story. John La Roche.
