= Paradice Avondale =

Public sports venue in Auckland, New Zealand

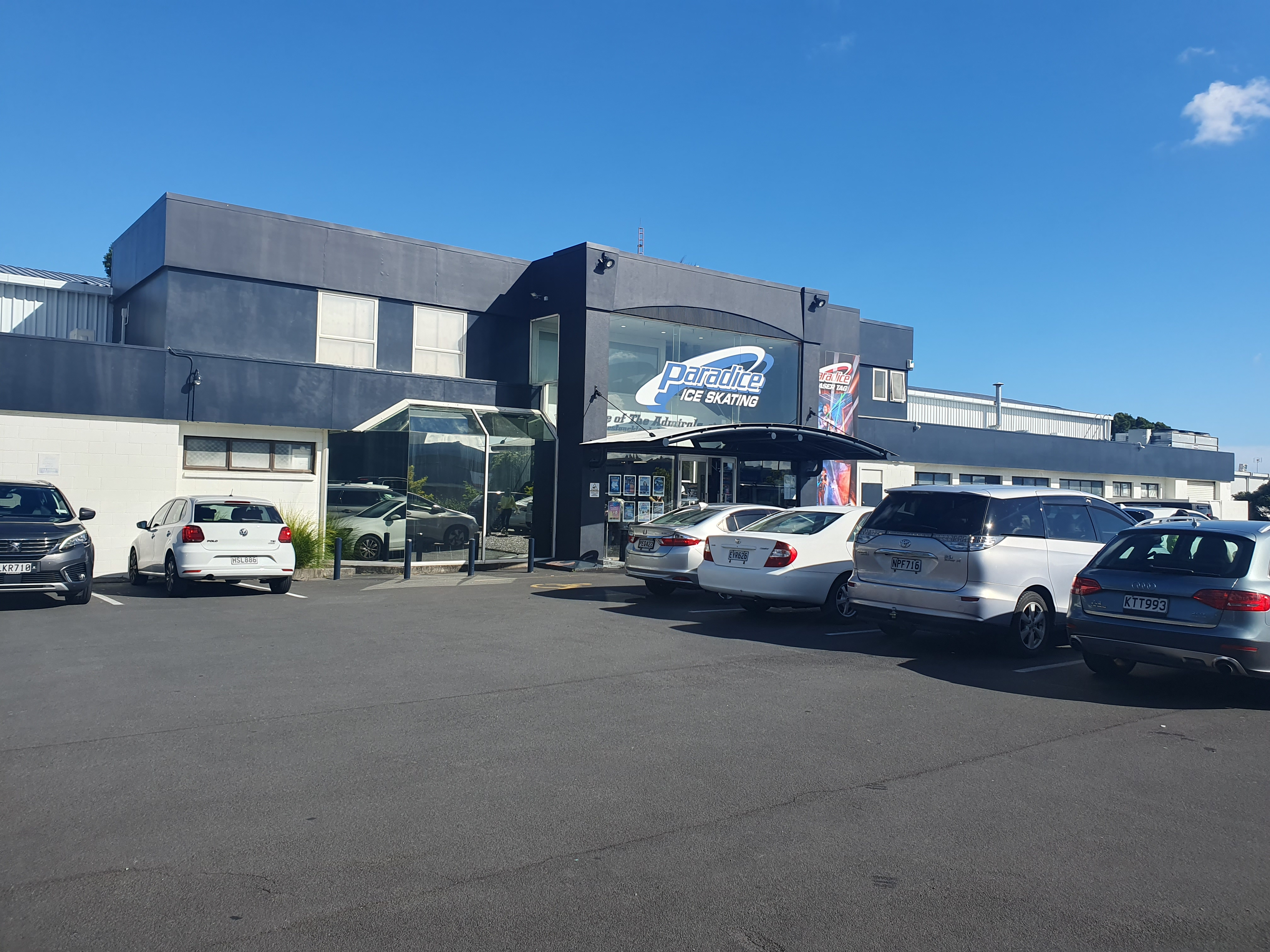
- Interactive map of Paradice Avondale
- Location: 150 Lansford Crescent, Avondale, Auckland, New Zealand, 0600
- Coordinates: 36.90537°S 174.69994°E
- Capacity: 500
- Surface: Ice - 60 m × 30 m (197 ft × 98 ft)

Construction
- Opened: May 1981 (44 years ago)
- Renovated: May 2011 (14 years ago); New ice floor, dasher boards and refrigeration system

Tenants
- West Auckland Admirals (2005–present); Auckland Steel (2014–present); Auckland Mako (2021–present)

Website
- www.paradice.co.nz

Paradice Avondale is an ice sports and public skate centre, opened in May 1981 as an indoor ice rink and entertainment centre. It is located in the New Zealand city of Auckland, in the western-suburbs, at Avondale. It is the current home venue of the West Auckland Admirals in the New Zealand Ice Hockey League (NZIHL) and Auckland Steel in the New Zealand Women's Ice Hockey League (NZWIHL). It is also used as one of two home venues of the Auckland Mako in the NZIHL. The arena is the oldest and largest operational ice sports centre in Auckland.

== History ==
Paradice Avondale, located on Lansford Crescent, was opened in May 1981 by Ross Blong and his wife. It was the former dairy farming couple's second ice rink, having established the 'Paradice' name with their first rink in Glen Innes when they bought it and took over operations in 1974. In 1980, Ross and his wife decided to build a new indoor multi-purpose entertainment facility, including the first international standard Olympic-sized ice rink in New Zealand. The build took a year and a half and by May 1981 the new facility was opened to the public. The rink has proven popular over the years, with public and community ice skating, ice hockey, curling and other ice sports being played at the arena by people of all ages. Throughout the history of the rink, it has remained a family business with Ross' children, Rosie Armstrong, Chris Blong and Darren Blong, taking on ownership roles at Avondale and the sister-facility in Botany. Since 2005, Paradice Avondale has played host and become a home venue for multiple elite ice sports programs in New Zealand, hosting NZIHL and NZWIHL games. In 2011, the venue was extensively renovated with a new ice floor and refrigeration system installed as well new dasher boards around the edge of the rink.

== Facilities ==
The arena's facilities were built in 1981 and have been gradually updated with the last major upgrade coming in 2011. They include:

- 60 m × 30 m ice rink (Olympic sized with disco LED lighting)
- 500 spectator capacity
- Skate and equipment hire
- Café
- Snack bar
- Laser tag
- Birthday party room
- Public toilets
- Lockers
- Outdoor parking

== Events ==
The arena hosts public skating and disco nights events. Paradice Avondale is associated with a number of ice sports clubs and associations that operate a number of junior, community and elite level programs and events at the venue. These include Auckland Ice Hockey Association, Hockey House, New Zealand Ice Figure Skating Association, Allegro Ice Dance Club, Auckland Ice Figure Skating Club, Glenburn Figure Skating Club, Hauraki Ice Racing Club, Ice Speed Skating New Zealand and Auckland Curling Club. The arena organises its own skating academy that holds events throughout the year. The arena hosts national level ice hockey games during the NZIHL and NZWIHL seasons.

== See also ==
- List of ice rinks in New Zealand
- Sport in New Zealand
