= Ark in the Park (conservation project) =

Coordinates: 36.89°S 174.53°E

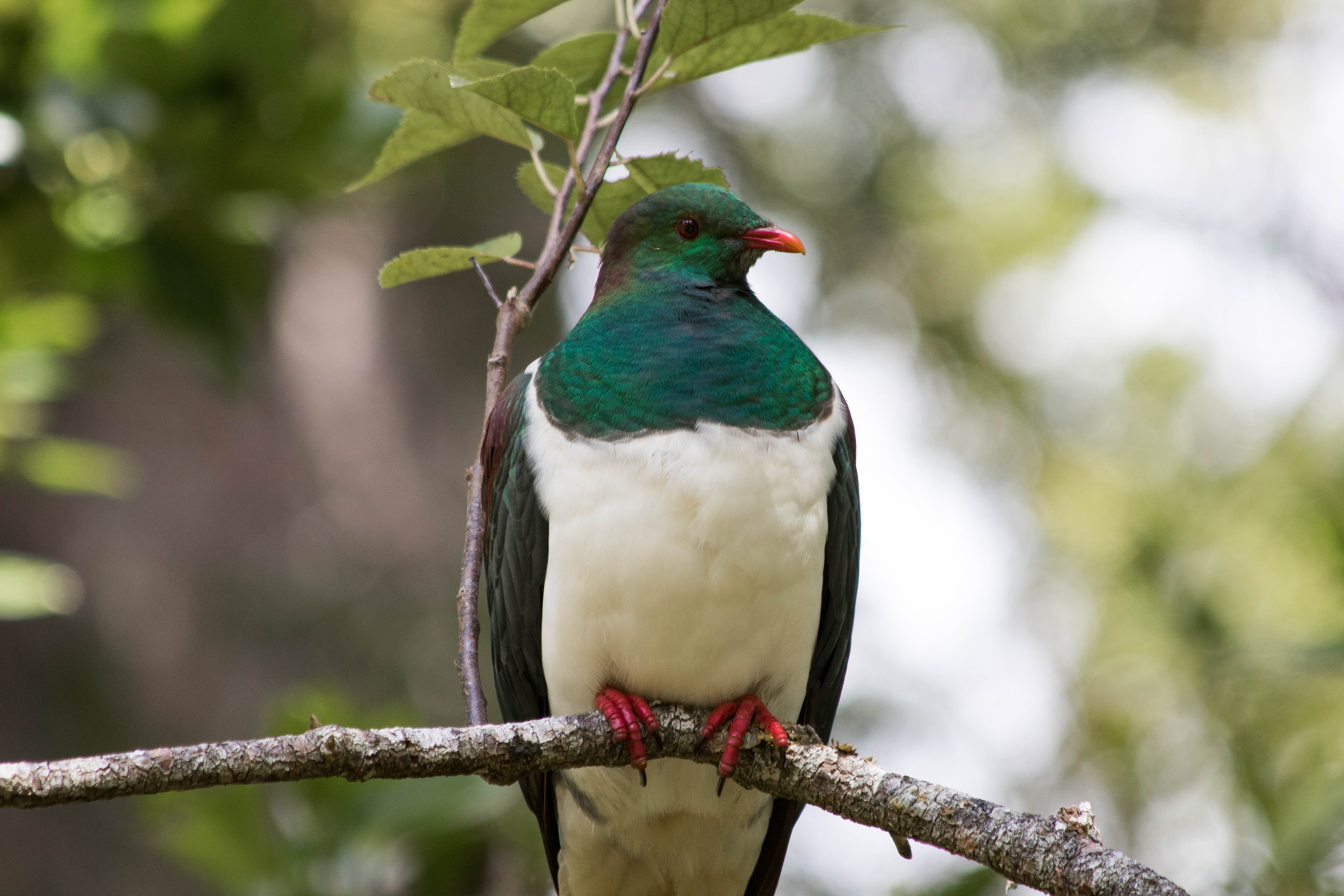
A kererū seen at the Ark in the Park sanctuary in 2016

Ark in the Park is an open sanctuary and conservation project in the Waitākere Ranges near Auckland. It is a partnership between Forest & Bird and Auckland Council that is supported by Te Kawerau ā Maki that aims to remove non-native pest mammals and predators and re-introduce species that were made extinct in the area.

== History ==
The project was started in 2002 by a small group of volunteers, who set traps for pest species within the Ark in the Park sanctuary area. A pilot programme covering 200 hectares was launched in 2003 which saw bait lines spaced 100m apart through the forest, with bait stations every 50m. By 2019, the project covered 2,270 hectares.

== Species reintroduction ==
A number of native bird species have been reintroduced to the park, beginning with whitehead (pōpokatea) and North Island robin (toutouwai). In 2007, hihi (stitchbird) were released, however the translocation was not successful. In 2009, North Island kōkako were reintroduced to the area; having last been seen in the ranges in the 1950s.
