= 2011 NZIHL season =

The 2011 NZIHL season was the seventh season of the New Zealand Ice Hockey League, the top level of ice hockey in New Zealand. Five teams participated in the league, and the Botany Swarm won the championship by defeating the Southern Stampede in the final.

== Regular season ==
	Club	GP	W	OTW	T	OTL	L	GF–GA	Pts
1.	Botany Swarm	16	12	0	1	1	3	94:44	37
2.	Southern Stampede	16	11	0	0	1	5	87:63	33
3.	Canterbury Red Devils	16	10	1	2	1	4	77:62	33
4.	Dunedin Thunder	16	3	2	2	0	11	78:108	13
5.	West Auckland Admirals	16	1	0	1	1	14	51:110	4

== Final ==
- Botany Swarm – Southern Stampede 5:3
