= 2008 NZIHL season =

== 2008 NZIHL Standings ==
=== Grand Final ===
Botany Swarm 3 - 2 Canterbury Red Devils (sudden death extra time)

=== Round robin ===
Position	Team	GP	W	L	T	PTS	GF	GA	GD
1	Canterbury Red Devils	12	9	1	2	32	93	48	45
2	Botany Swarm	12	8	1	3	31	65	35	30
3	Southern Stampede	12	5	6	1	18	58	56	2
4	West Auckland Admirals	12	3	7	2	15	48	64	-16
5	Dunedin Thunder	12	1	11	0	4	30	91	-61

W = Main Round Win = 3 points
L = Main Round Loss
T = Main Round Tie = 2 points
BP = Bonus Point = 1 point

== 2008 NZIHL Awards ==
MVP of Botany Swarm - Zak Nothling

MVP of Canterbury Red Devils - Janos Kaszala

MVP of Dunedin Thunder - Paavo Huhtinen

MVP of Southern Stampede - Brett Speirs

MVP of West Auckland Admirals - Alex Gävfert

Best Defenceman - Hayden Argyle (Southern Stampede)

Top Goaltender - Zak Nothling (Botany Swarm)

Top Points Scorer - Janos Kaszala (Canterbury Red Devils)

League MVP - Valery Konev (Canterbury Red Devils)

Top Rookie - Daniel Nichols (Canterbury Red Devils)

Finals MVP - Zak Nothling (Botany Swarm)
