= Valery Votrin =

Belgian fiction writer of Russian origin (born 1974)

Valéry Votrin
- Born: March 2, 1974 (age 52); Tashkent, USSR
- Occupations: Writer, translator, environmental consultant
- Writing career
- Genres: magic realism, weird fiction

Valéry Votrin (Russian: Вале́рий Ге́нрихович Во́трин, born March 2, 1974) is a Belgian fiction writer of Russian origin. He writes in Russian and English (under the name Val Votrin).

== Biography ==
Born in Tashkent, Soviet Union, he studied English Language and Literature at the Faculty of Germanic and Romance Studies at Tashkent State University. In 2000, he moved to Belgium where he received an MSc degree in Human Ecology and a PhD degree in Environmental Science from the Free University of Brussels (VUB). He has worked as an environmental consultant specialising in environmental due diligence and auditing.

He has published short stories and novels since 1995. In 2009, his novel The Last Magog was shortlisted for the Andrei Bely Prize, the oldest independent literary prize in Russia. Another novel, The Speech Therapist was nominated for a string of literary awards, including the Russian Booker Prize, the Big Book Prize and the Alexander Piatigorsky Prize.

He translated and published short stories by Flann O'Brien, T. F. Powys, and Eric Stenbock as well as numerous poems by the 17th – 20th century English and Scottish poets, including Francis Quarles, Jeremy Taylor, Phineas Fletcher, Robert Southey, Gerard Manley Hopkins, A. E. Housman, William Soutar, and Robert Garioch. His poetry translations are mainly collected in the anthology “Seven Centuries of English Poetry” (Moscow, Vodolei Publishers, 2007). In 2012, he published his translation of The City of Dreadful Night, a long poem by James Thomson.

Votrin also collected a two-volume Russian edition of plays and short stories by Belgian dramatist Michel De Ghelderode in 2004.

== Published books ==
- The Book of Prayers and Complaints (Жалитвослов, 2007)
- The Last Magog (Последний магог, 2008)
- The Speech Therapist (Логопед, 2012)
- The Compiler of Bestiaries (Составитель бестиариев, 2021)

== Criticism ==
- (in Russian) Alexei Parshchikov, Leaving Arcadia, a review in the New Literary Observer, 2008.
- (in Russian) Alexander Chantsev, The Swathed History, a review in the New Literary Observer, 2008.
