= Bertram Dobell =

English bookseller and literary scholar (1842–1914)

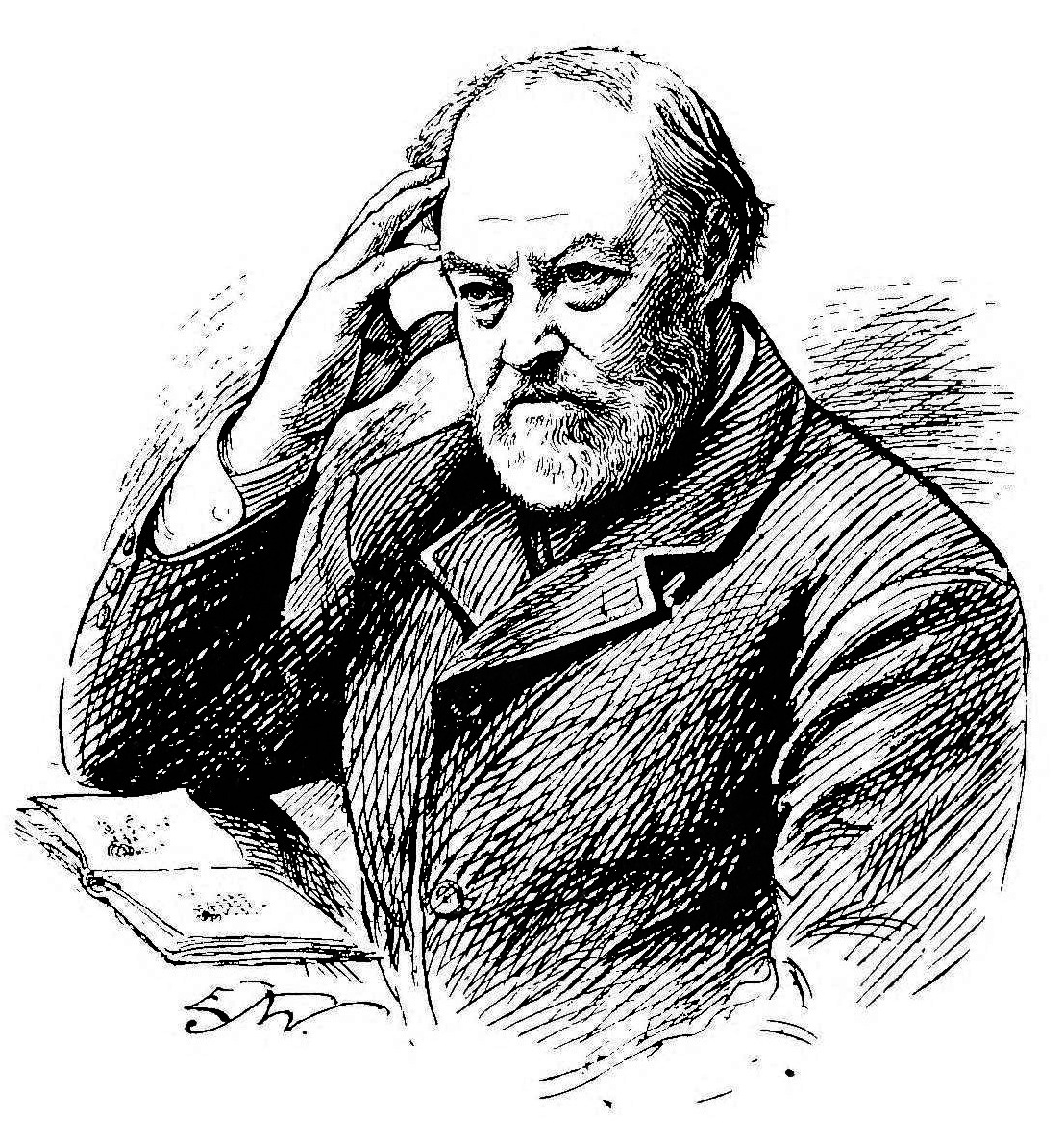
- Portrait from In Memoriam. Bertram Dobell. 1842-1914 (1915)
- Born: 9 January 1842; Battle, East Sussex, England
- Died: 14 December 1914 (aged 72); Haverstock Hill, London, England
- Occupations: Bookseller; literary scholar
- Spouse: Eleanor Wymer (m. 1869; died 1910)
- Children: 5
- Relatives: Doug Dobell (grandson)

Bertram Dobell (9 January 1842 – 14 December 1914) was an English bookseller and literary scholar. Largely self-educated, he became a London bookseller and published or reissued works by writers including James Thomson and Thomas Traherne. Dobell also wrote poetry, literary criticism, and biographical works.

== Biography ==
=== Early life and family ===
Bertram Dobell was born on 9 January 1842 in Battle, East Sussex, the son of Edward Dobell, a tailor of Huguenot descent, and Elizabeth Dobell (née Eldridge). His father was disabled by paralysis at an early age, and the family lived in difficult circumstances.

Dobell received little formal education and entered the workforce at an early age. In London, he first worked as a grocer's errand boy and later became an assistant in the shop. As a child, he used his spare pennies to buy second-hand books and pamphlets.

On 24 July 1869, he married Eleanor Wymer (1847–1910). The couple had five children.

=== Career in bookselling ===
In 1872, Dobell and his wife opened a stationer and newsagent's shop in Queen's Crescent, Kentish Town. He later established two second-hand bookshops on Charing Cross Road, which became known among book collectors.

Dobel's booksellers' catalogues also drew literary notice. Arthur Quiller-Couch praised him for continuing "the good tradition which knits writers, printers, vendors, and purchasers of books together", and wrote that Dobell took pains to make his second-hand catalogues "better reading than half the new books printed".

=== Literary connections ===
Dobell developed friendships with several contemporary writers, including the poet James Thomson. He later edited and published Thomson's poetry in book form.

Dobell was a member of the interim committee of the Shelley Society.

=== Death ===
Dobell died of liver cancer on 14 December 1914 at his home in Haverstock Hill, London, aged 72. An obituary was published in The New York Times.

Following Dobell's death, his business passed to his sons Percy and Arthur, who had both worked for him.

== Works ==
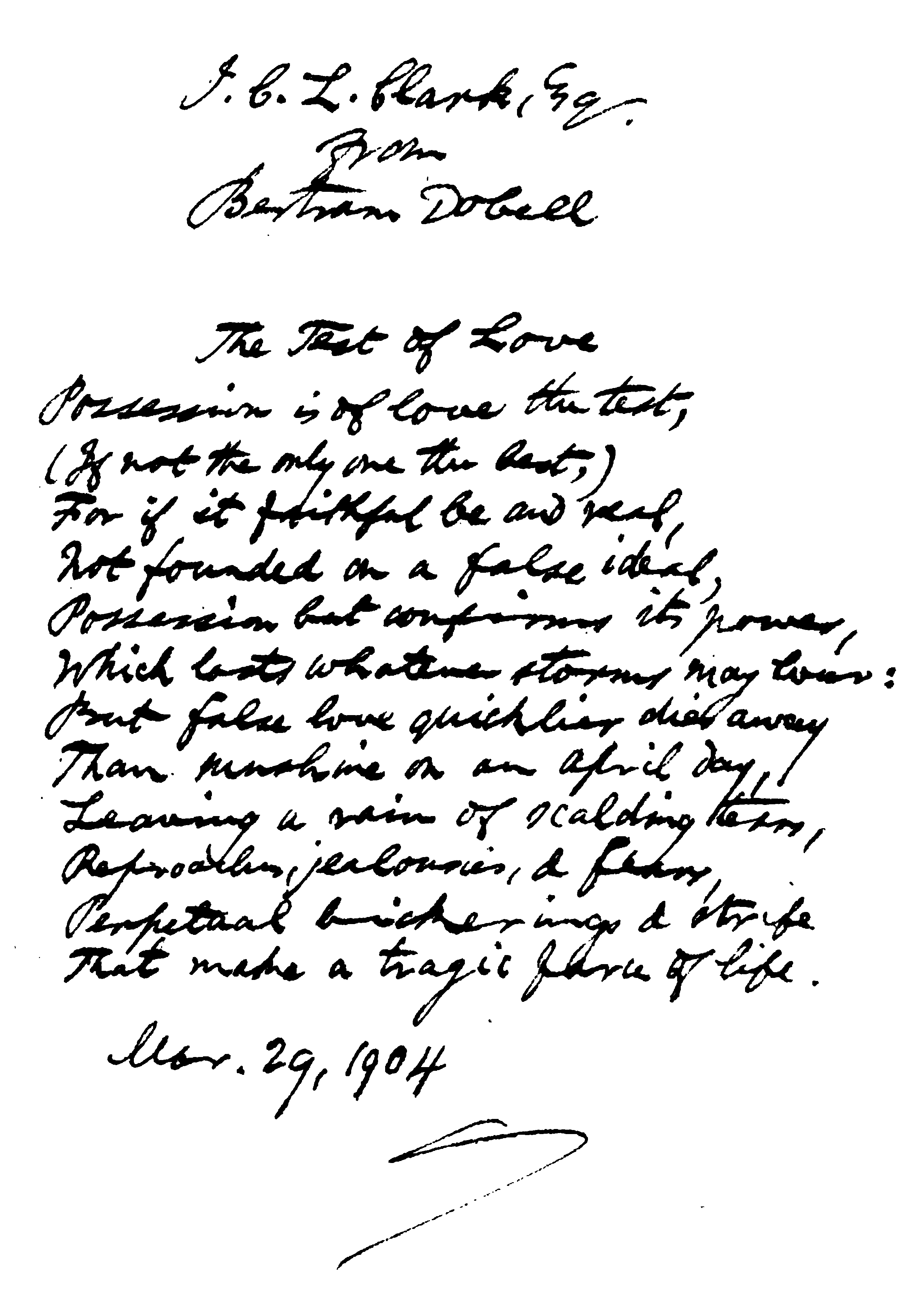
"Rosemary and Pansies", handwritten note by Dobell, 1904

Dobell edited works by Thomas Traherne, Shelley, Oliver Goldsmith, William Strode, and James Thomson. He first issued books through other publishers, but later began publishing under his own imprint. His early publications under that imprint included a "cheaper and more popular" edition of Thomson's The City of Dreadful Night in 1899.

Dobell privately published a collection of his own verse, Rosemary and Pansies, in 1901, and reissued it in expanded form in 1904. The expanded edition received notice for its satires and epigrams, and contained a dozen haikai, among the early English experiments with the Japanese poetic form later known as haiku.

Dobell's other books included A Century of Sonnets (1910), and the biographies Sidelights on Charles Lamb (1903) and The Laureate of Pessimism: A Sketch of the Life of James Thomson (1910).
