= Highgate Cemetery =

Place of burial in north London, England

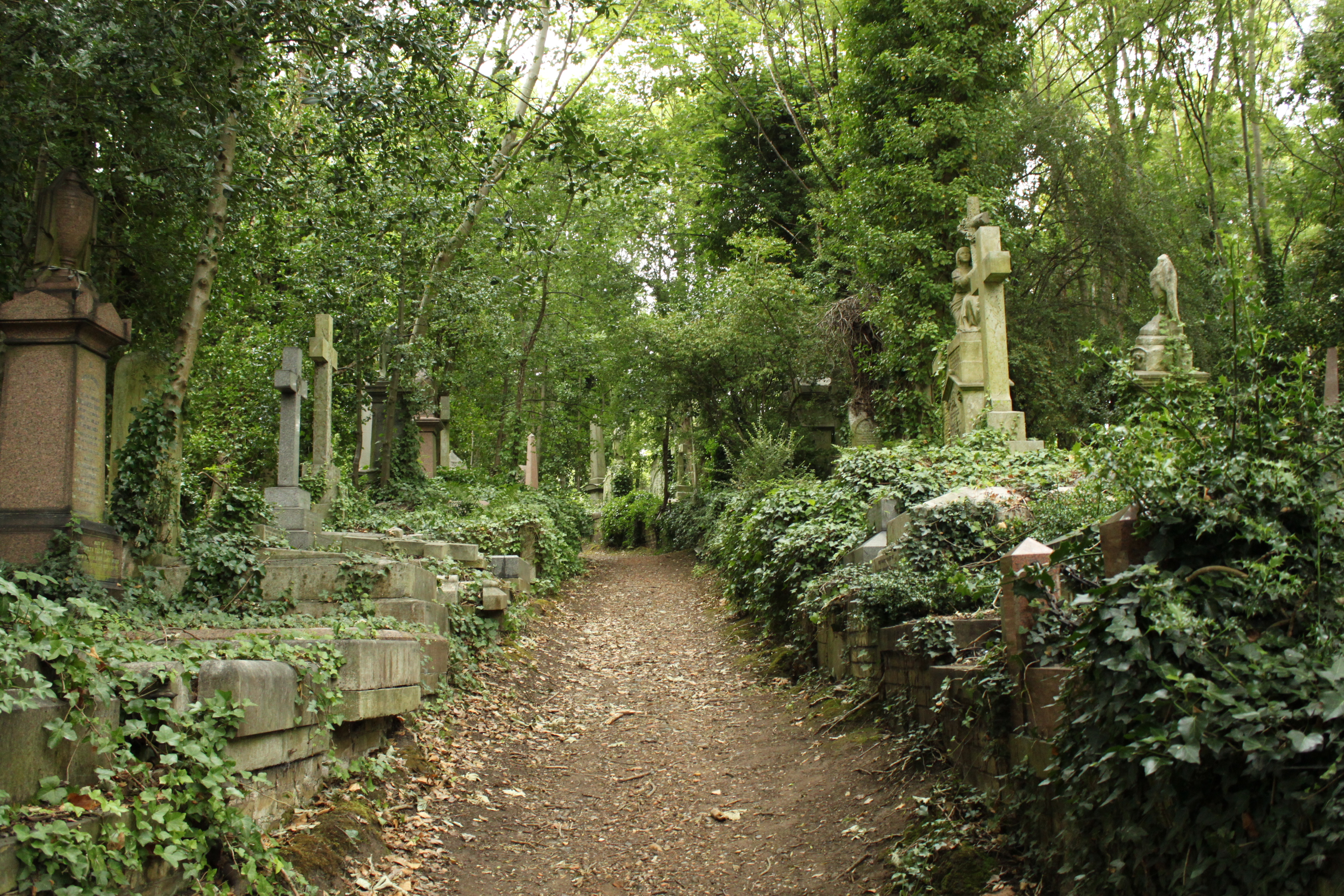
- Highgate Cemetery (East) (c. 2010)
- Interactive map of Highgate Cemetery

Details
- Established: 1839; 187 years ago
- Location: Swain's Lane, London, N6 6PJ
- Country: England
- Coordinates: 51°34′01″N 0°08′49″W
- Owned by: Friends of Highgate Cemetery Trust
- Size: 15 hectares (37 acres)
- No. of graves: 53,000+
- No. of interments: 170,000
- Website: www.highgatecemetery.org

Highgate Cemetery is a place of burial in North London, England, designed by architect Stephen Geary. There are approximately 170,000 people buried in around 53,000 graves across the West and East sides. Highgate Cemetery is notable both for some of the people buried there either in coffins or urns as well as for its de facto status as a nature reserve. The Cemetery is designated Grade I on the Register of Historic Parks and Gardens.

== Location ==
The cemetery is in Highgate N6, next to Waterlow Park, in the London Borough of Camden. It comprises two sides, on either side of Swain's Lane. The main gate is on Swain's Lane, just north of Oakshott Avenue. There is another, disused, gate on Chester Road. The nearest public transport (Transport for London) is the C11 bus, Brookfield Park stop, and Archway tube station.

== History and setting ==
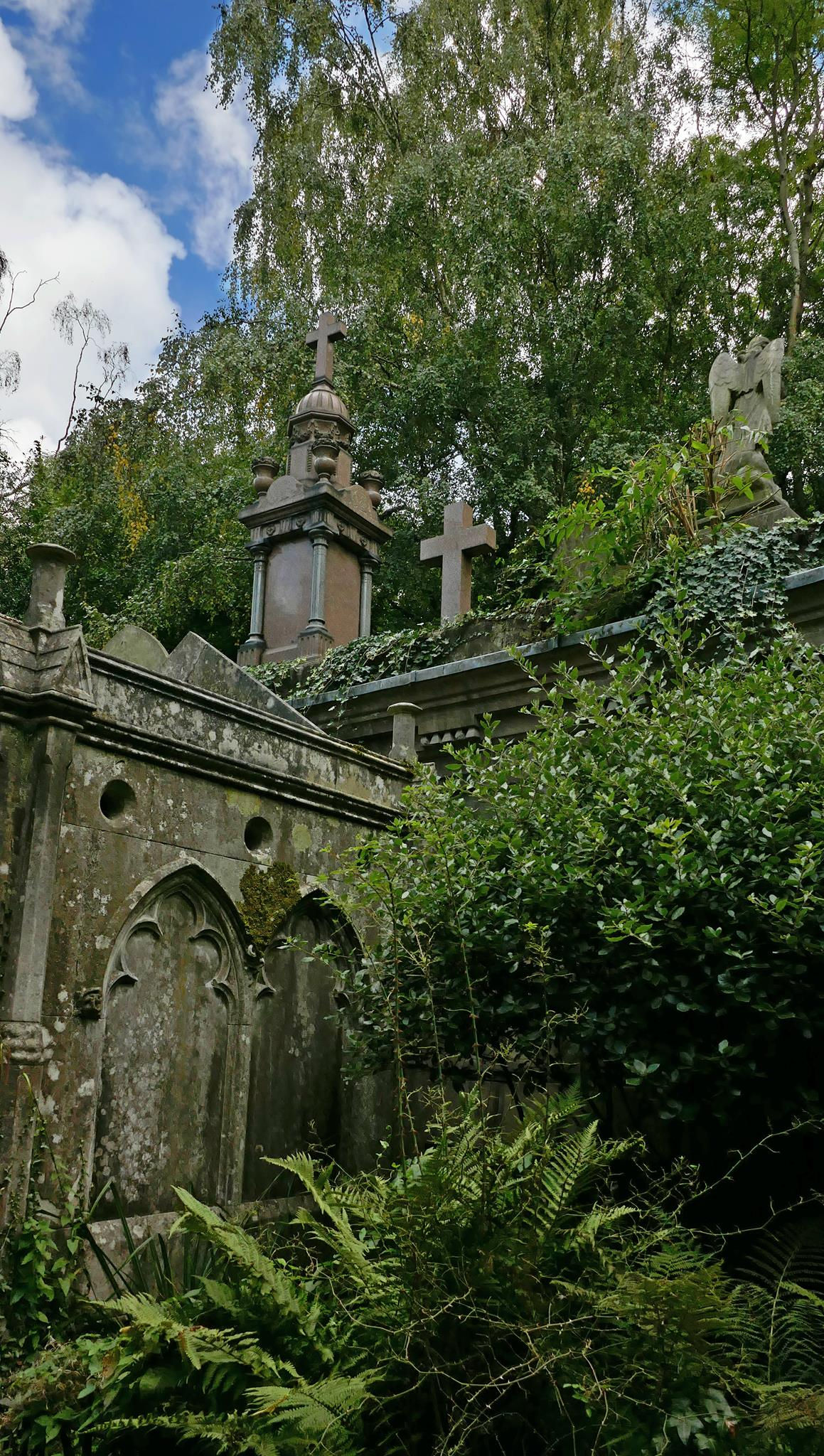
Tombs near the Circle of Lebanon crypts at Highgate Cemetery West, London.

The cemetery in its original form – the northwestern wooded area – opened in 1839 by the London Cemetery Company, as part of a plan to provide seven large, modern cemeteries, now known as the "Magnificent Seven", around the outside of central London. The inner-city cemeteries, mostly the graveyards attached to individual churches, had long been unable to cope with the number of burials and were seen as a hazard to health and an undignified way to treat the dead. The initial design was by architect and entrepreneur Stephen Geary. The London Cemetery Company was incorporated by the London Cemetery Company Act 1836 (6 & 7 Will. 4. c. cxxxvi).

On 20 May 1839, Highgate (West) Cemetery was dedicated to St James by the Right Reverend Charles James Blomfield, Lord Bishop of London. 15 acres (6.1 ha) were consecrated for the use of the Church of England, and two acres were set aside for dissenters. Rights of burial were sold either for a limited period or in perpetuity. The first burial was Elizabeth Jackson of Little Windmill Street, Soho, on 26 May.

Highgate, like the others of the Magnificent Seven, soon became a fashionable place for burials and was much admired and visited. The Victorian attitude to death and its presentation led to the creation of a wealth of Gothic tombs and buildings. It occupies a spectacular south-facing hillside site slightly downhill from the top of Highgate hill, next to Waterlow Park. In 1854 a further 19 acres (8 ha) to the south east of the original area, across Swain's Lane, were bought to form the eastern extension; this opened in 1860. Both sides of the cemetery are still used today for burials.

Highgate Cemetery Act 2022
- Act of Parliament
- Parliament of the United Kingdom
- Long title: An Act to confer powers upon the Friends of Highgate Cemetery Trust to operate, maintain and conserve Highgate Cemetery and to extinguish rights of burial and disturb human remains in Highgate Cemetery for the purpose of increasing the space for interments and the conservation of Highgate Cemetery; and for connected purposes.
- Citation: 2022 c. i

Dates
- Royal assent: 24 March 2022

Status: Current legislation

Text of statute as originally enacted

Text of the Highgate Cemetery Act 2022 as in force today (including any amendments) within the United Kingdom, from legislation.gov.uk.

The cemetery's grounds are full of trees, shrubbery and wildflowers, most of which have been planted and grown without human influence. The grounds are a haven for birds and small mammals, such as foxes. The London Cemetery Company became bankrupt in 1960, and was absorbed by the United Cemetery Company. The cemetery is now owned and maintained by a charitable trust, the Friends of Highgate Cemetery Trust, which was set up in 1975 and acquired the freehold of both East and West sides by 1981. In 1984 it published Highgate Cemetery: Victorian Valhalla by John Gay. The trust was given updated powers to manage the cemetery and extinguish rights of burial by the Highgate Cemetery Act 2022 (c. i).

== Graves ==
=== West Side ===
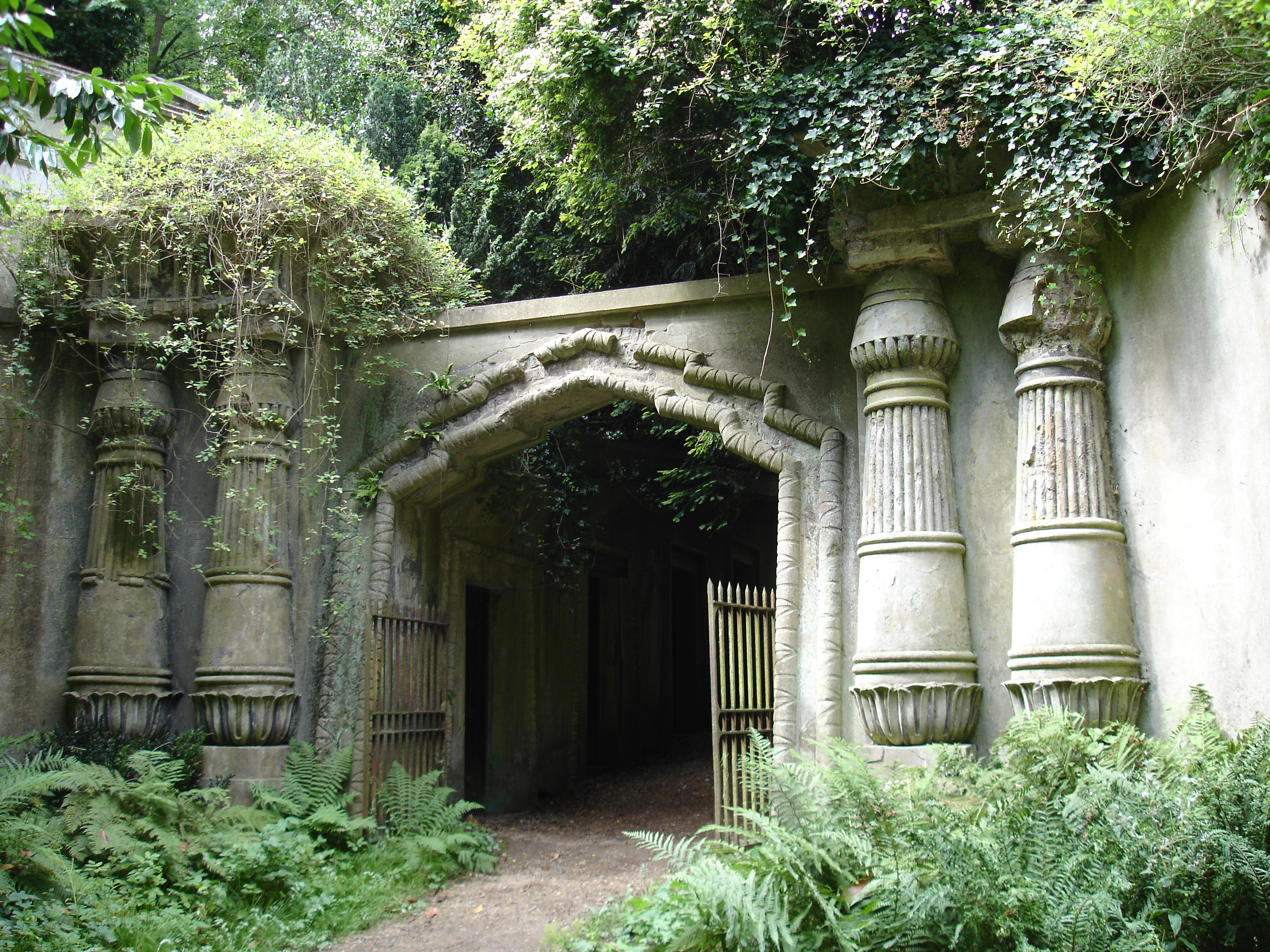
Entrance to the Egyptian Avenue, Highgate Cemetery West

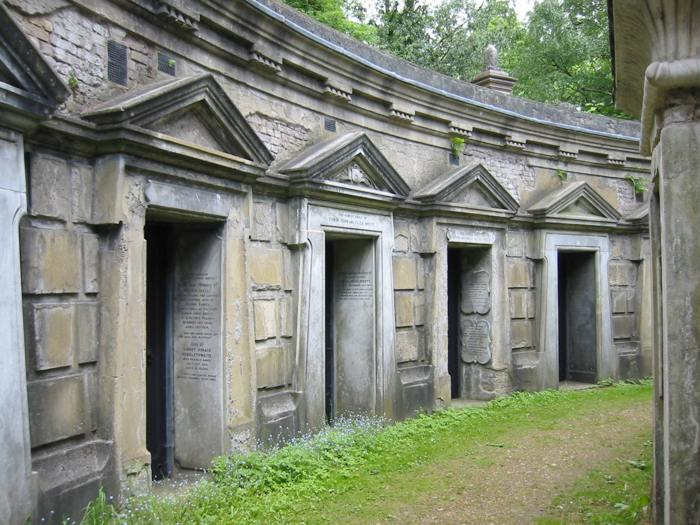
Circle of Lebanon, Highgate Cemetery West

The Egyptian Avenue and the Circle of Lebanon (previously surmounted by a huge, 280-year-old Cedar of Lebanon, which had to be cut down and replaced in August 2019) are both Grade I listed buildings. The west side of the Cemetery is characterised by elaborate feature tombs, vaults and winding paths dug into hillsides. At the highest point, the Terrace Catacombs and the Julius Beer Mausoleum are both Grade II* listed. In 1967 the Dissenter's Catacombs were declared unsafe and demolished. Three houses were subsequently built on the site. The Grey House, built in 2008, is visible from the West Side of the cemetery on Faraday Path.

==== Notable West Side interments ====
- Henry Alken (1785–1851), painter, engraver and illustrator of sporting and coaching scenes
- Jane Arden, Welsh-born film director, actress, screenwriter, playwright, songwriter, and poet
- John Atcheler, 'Horse slaughterer to Queen Victoria'
- Edward Hodges Baily, sculptor
- Beryl Bainbridge, author
- Abraham Dee Bartlett, zoologist, superintendent of the London Zoo known for selling the popular African elephant Jumbo to P. T. Barnum
- Julius Beer (and family members), owner of The Observer.
- Francis Bedford, landscape photographer
- William Belt, barrister and antiquarian, best known for his eccentric behaviour
- Mary Matilda Betham, diarist, poet, woman of letters, and miniature portrait painter
- Eugenius Birch, seaside architect and noted designer of promenade-piers
- Edward Blore, architect known for his work on Buckingham Palace and Westminster Abbey
- Edwin Brett, publisher and pioneer of serialised sensational weekly fiction and 'penny dreadfuls'
- Jacob Bronowski (ashes), scientist, creator of the television series The Ascent of Man
- James Bunstone Bunning, City Architect to the City of London
- Robert William Buss, artist and illustrator
- Edward Dundas Butler, translator and senior librarian at the Department of Printed Books, British Museum
- Edward Cardwell, 1st Viscount Cardwell, prominent politician in the Peelite and Liberal parties, best remembered for his tenure as Secretary of State for War
- William Benjamin Carpenter, physician, invertebrate zoologist and physiologist
- Joseph William Comyns Carr, drama and art critic, gallery director, author, poet, playwright and theatre manager
- John James Chalon, Swiss painter
- Robert Caesar Childers, scholar of the Orient and writer
- Edmund Chipp, organist and composer
- Charles Chubb, lock and safe manufacturer
- Antoine Claudet, pioneering early photographer, honoured by Queen Victoria as "Photographer-in-ordinary"
- John Cross, English artist
- Philip Conisbee, art historian and curator
- Abraham Cooper, animal and battle painter
- Thomas Frederick Cooper, watchmaker
- John Singleton Copley, Lord Chancellor and son of the American painter John Singleton Copley
- Sir Charles Cowper, Premier of New South Wales, Australia
- Addison Cresswell, comedians' agent and producer
- George Baden Crawley, civil engineer and railway builder
- Charles Cruft, founder of Crufts dog show
- Isaac Robert Cruikshank, caricaturist, illustrator, portrait miniaturist and brother of George Cruikshank
- George Dalziel, engraver who with his siblings ran one of the most prolific Victorian engraving firms
- George Darnell, schoolmaster and author of Darnell's Copybooks
- David Devant, theatrical magician
- Alfred Lamert Dickens, the younger brother of Charles Dickens
- Catherine Dickens, wife of Charles Dickens
- John and Elizabeth Dickens, parents of Charles Dickens
- Fanny Dickens, elder sister of Charles Dickens
- William Hepworth Dixon, historian and traveller. Also active in organizing London's Great Exhibition of 1851
- Herbert Druce, entomologist and involved in the Druce-Portland affair
- Herbert Benjamin Edwardes, Administrator and soldier, known as the "Hero of Multan"
- Joseph Edwards, Welsh sculptor
- Thomas Edwards, (Caerfallwch), Welsh author and lexicographer
- Ugo Ehiogu, footballer
- James Harington Evans, Baptist pastor of the John Street Chapel
- Benjamin Hawes, 19th-century British Whig politician, known in UK parliament as "Hawes the Soap-Boiler"
- Michael Faraday, chemist and physicist (with his wife Sarah), in the Dissenters section
- Sir Charles Fellows, archaeologist and explorer, known for his numerous expeditions in what is present-day Turkey.
- Charles Drury Edward Fortnum, art collector and benefactor of the Ashmolean Museum
- Lucian Freud, painter, grandson of Sigmund Freud, and elder brother of Clement Freud
- John Galsworthy, author and Nobel Prize winner (cenotaph, he was cremated and his ashes scattered)
- Stephen Geary, architect of Highgate Cemetery
- John Gibbons, ironmaster and art patron
- Stella Gibbons, novelist, author of Cold Comfort Farm
- Margaret Gillies, Scottish painter known for her miniature portraits, including of one of Charles Dickens
- John William Griffith, architect of Kensal Green Cemetery
- Henry Gray, anatomist and surgeon, author of Gray's Anatomy.
- Radclyffe Hall, author of The Well of Loneliness and other novels
- William Hall, founder with Edward Chapman of publishers Chapman & Hall
- William Dobinson Halliburton, physiologist, noted for being one of the founders of the science of biochemistry
- Philip Harben, English cook regarded as the first TV celebrity chef
- Sir Charles Augustus Hartley, eminent British civil engineer, known as 'the father of the Danube.'
- George Edwards Hering, landscape painter
- Edwin Hill, older brother of Rowland Hill and inventor of the first letter scale and a mechanical system to make envelopes
- Frank Holl, Royal portraitist
- Ian Holm, English actor
- James Holman, 19th-century adventurer known as "the Blind Traveller"
- Surgeon-General Sir Anthony Home, Victoria Cross recipient from Indian Mutiny
- Theodore Hope, British colonial administrator and writer
- Thomas Hopley, headmaster who beat one of his pupils to death
- William Hosking, first Professor of Architecture at King's College London and architect of Abney Park Cemetery
- Bob Hoskins, actor
- Georgiana Houghton, British artist and spiritualist medium
- David Edward Hughes, FRS, 19th-century electrical engineer and inventor
- William Henry Hunt, popular and widely collected painter of watercolours, nicknamed 'Bird's Nest' Hunt
- Sir John Hutton, publisher of Sporting Life and Chairman of the London County Council
- Georges Jacobi, composer, conductor and musical director of the Alhambra Theatre
- Lisa Jardine (ashes), historian
- Victor Kullberg, one of the greatest marine clockmakers
- Thomas Landseer, younger brother of Sir Edwin Landseer (there is a cenotaph, Edwin was buried in St Paul's Cathedral)
- Sir Peter Laurie, politician and Lord Mayor of London
- Douglas Lapraik, shipowner and co-founder of HSBC and the Hongkong and Shanghai Hotels Group
- Henry Lee, surgeon, pathologist and syphilologist
- Oswald Lewis, MP and younger son of John Lewis, founder of the chain of department stores
- Robert Liston, surgeon
- Alexander Litvinenko, Russian dissident, murdered by poisoning in London
- Edward Lloyd, influential newspaper publisher and founder of the Daily Chronicle
- James Locke, a London draper credited with giving Tweed its name
- William Lovett, Chartist
- Samuel Lucas, editor of the Morning Star, journalist and abolitionist
- Archibald Maclaine (British Army officer)
- John Maple, founder of the furniture makers Maple & Co.
- Hugh Mackay Matheson, industrialist and founder of Matheson & Company and Rio Tinro
- Frederick Denison Maurice, English Anglican theologian, prolific author and one of the founders of Christian socialism
- Michael Meacher, academic and Labour Party politician
- George Michael, singer, songwriter, music producer and philanthropist; buried beside his mother and sister.
- Barbara Mills, (ashes) first female Director of Public Prosecutions
- Frederick Akbar Mahomed, internationally known British physician
- Jude Moraes, landscape gardener, writer and broadcaster
- Nicholas Mosley, novelist and biographer of his father, Oswald Mosley
- Edward Moxhay, shoemaker, biscuit maker and property speculator, best known for his involvement in the landmark English land law case Tulk v Moxhay
- Elizabeth de Munck, mother of celebrated soprano, Maria Caterina Rosalbina Caradori-Allan in grave with large carving of pelican in piety
- General Sir Archibald James Murray, Chief of Staff to the WW1 British Expeditionary Force
- Walter Neurath, Publisher and founder of Thames and Hudson
- Henry Newton, painter and co-founder of Winsor & Newton
- Samuel Noble, English engraver, and minister of the New Church
- Feliks Nowosielski, Polish nobleman
- George Osbaldeston, known as Squire Osbaldeston, sportsman, gambler and Member of Parliament
- Sherard Osborn, Royal Navy admiral and Arctic explorer
- Frederick William Pavy, physician and physiologist
- William Payne, actor, dancer and pantomimist
- Thomas Ashburton Picken, watercolourist, engraver and lithographer
- Frances Polidori Rossetti, mother of Dante Gabriel, Christina and William Michael Rossetti
- Samuel Phelps, Shakespearian actor and manager of Sadler's Wells Theatre
- Owen Roberts (educator), pioneer of technical education, great-grandfather of Antony Armstrong-Jones, 1st Earl of Snowdon, former husband of Princess Margaret.
- James Robinson, dentist, first person to carry out general anaesthesia in Britain
- Sir John Richard Robinson, journalist, editor and manager of the Daily News
- Peter Robinson, founder of the Peter Robinson department store at Oxford Circus, London
- Sir William Charles Ross, portrait and portrait miniature painter
- Christina Rossetti, poet
- Gabriele Rossetti, Italian nationalist and scholar. Father of Christina and Dante Gabriel Rossetti
- William Michael Rossetti, co-founder of the Pre-Raphaelite Brotherhood
- Tom Sayers, pugilist, his tomb is guarded by the stone image of his mastiff, Lion, who was chief mourner at his funeral
- Henry Young Darracott Scott, responsible for the design and construction of the Royal Albert Hall
- Sir Peter Shepheard, architect and landscape architect, President of the RIBA, Architectural Association, Landscape Institute and the Royal Fine Art Commission
- Elizabeth Siddal, wife and model of artist/poet Dante Gabriel Rossetti and model for the painting Ophelia by John Everett Millais
- Jean Simmons, actress
- William Simpson, war artist and correspondent
- Sir John Smale, Chief Justice of Hong Kong
- Alice Mary Smith, Victorian composer (under married name White)
- Tom Smith, inventor of the Christmas cracker
- Charles Green Spencer, pioneer aviator and balloon manufacturer
- Alfred Stevens, sculptor, painter and designer
- Walter Fryer Stocks, prolific landscape painter
- Sir Henry Knight Storks, soldier, MP, and colonial administrator
- Anna Swanwick, author and feminist who assisted in the founding of Girton College, Cambridge, and Somerville Hall, Oxford
- Alfred Swaine Taylor, toxicologist, forensic scientist, expert witness
- Frederick Tennyson, poet, older brother of Alfred, Lord Tennyson
- Samuel Sanders Teulon, prolific Gothic Revival architect
- Jeanette Threlfall, hymnwriter and poet
- Charles Turner, mezzotint engraver who collaborated with J. M. W. Turner
- Andrew Ure, Scottish physician known for his galvanism experimentation, founder of the University of Strathclyde
- John Vandenhoff, leading Victorian actor
- Henry Vaughan, art collector who gave one of Britain's most popular paintings, John Constable's The Hay Wain to the National Gallery
- Emilie Ashurst Venturi, writer, translator and women's rights campaigner
- Arthur Waley, translator and scholar of the Orient
- George Wallis, First Keeper of the Fine Art Collection at the Victoria & Albert Museum
- Mary Warner, actress and theatre manager
- Augusta Webster, poet, dramatist, essayist, translator and advocate of women's suffrage
- Henry White, lawyer and gifted landscape photographer
- Brodie McGhie Willcox, founder of the P&O Shipping Line
- Henry Willis, foremost organ builder of the Victorian era
- Hugh Wilson, RAF test pilot
- George Wombwell, menagerie exhibitor
- Ellen Wood, author known as Mrs Henry Wood, there is also a plaque for her in Worcester Cathedral
- Adam Worth, criminal mastermind. Possible inspiration for Sherlock Holmes's nemesis, Professor Moriarty; originally buried in a pauper's grave under the name Henry J. Raymond
- Sir William Henry Wyatt, long-serving chairman of the Middlesex County Lunatic Asylum at Colney Hatch, Southgate
- Patrick Wymark, actor
- Arthur Wynn (ashes), British civil servant who ran a spy ring for the KGB
- Joseph Warren Zambra, scientific instrument maker

=== East Side ===
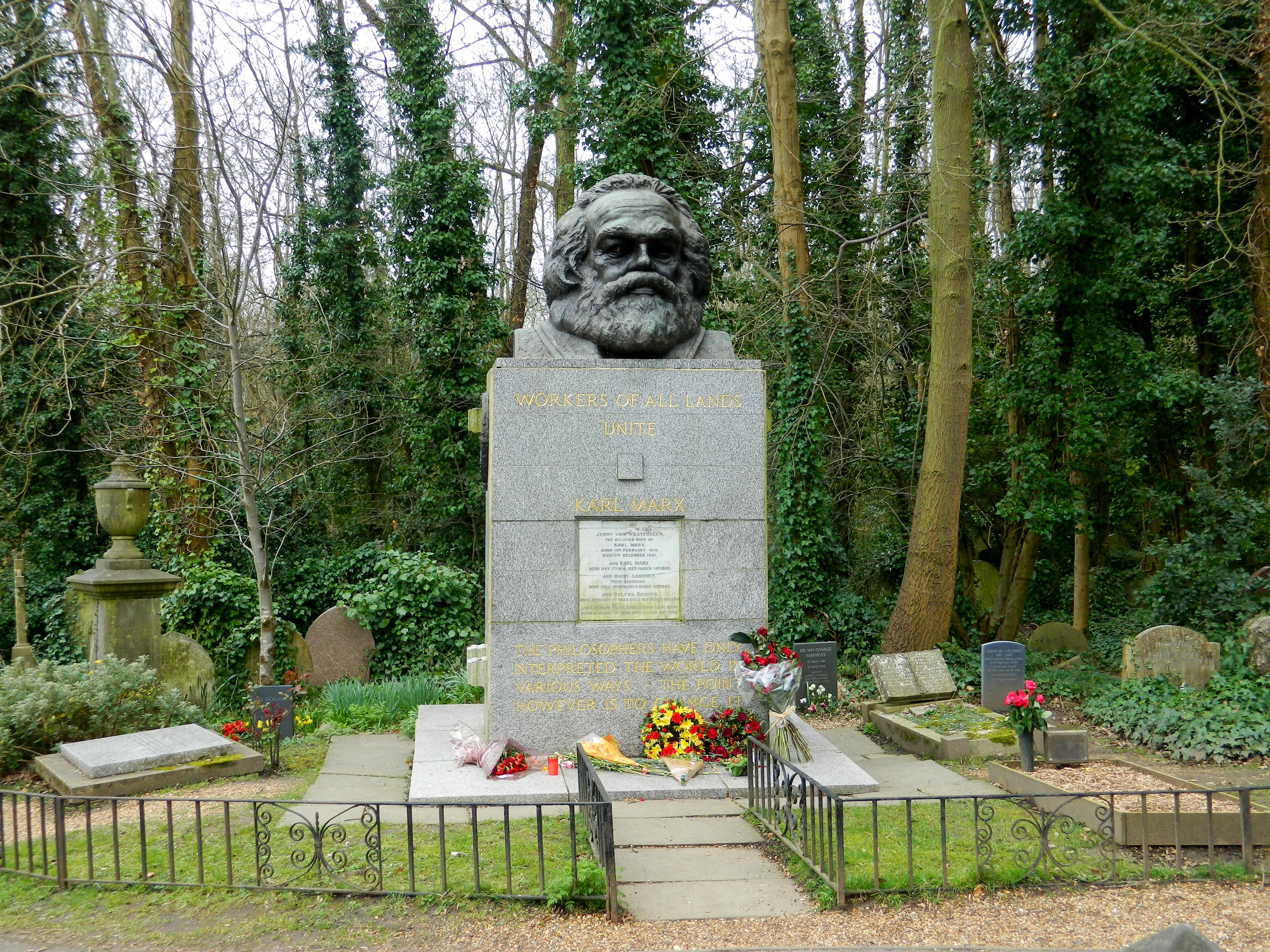
Tomb of Karl Marx, East Cemetery

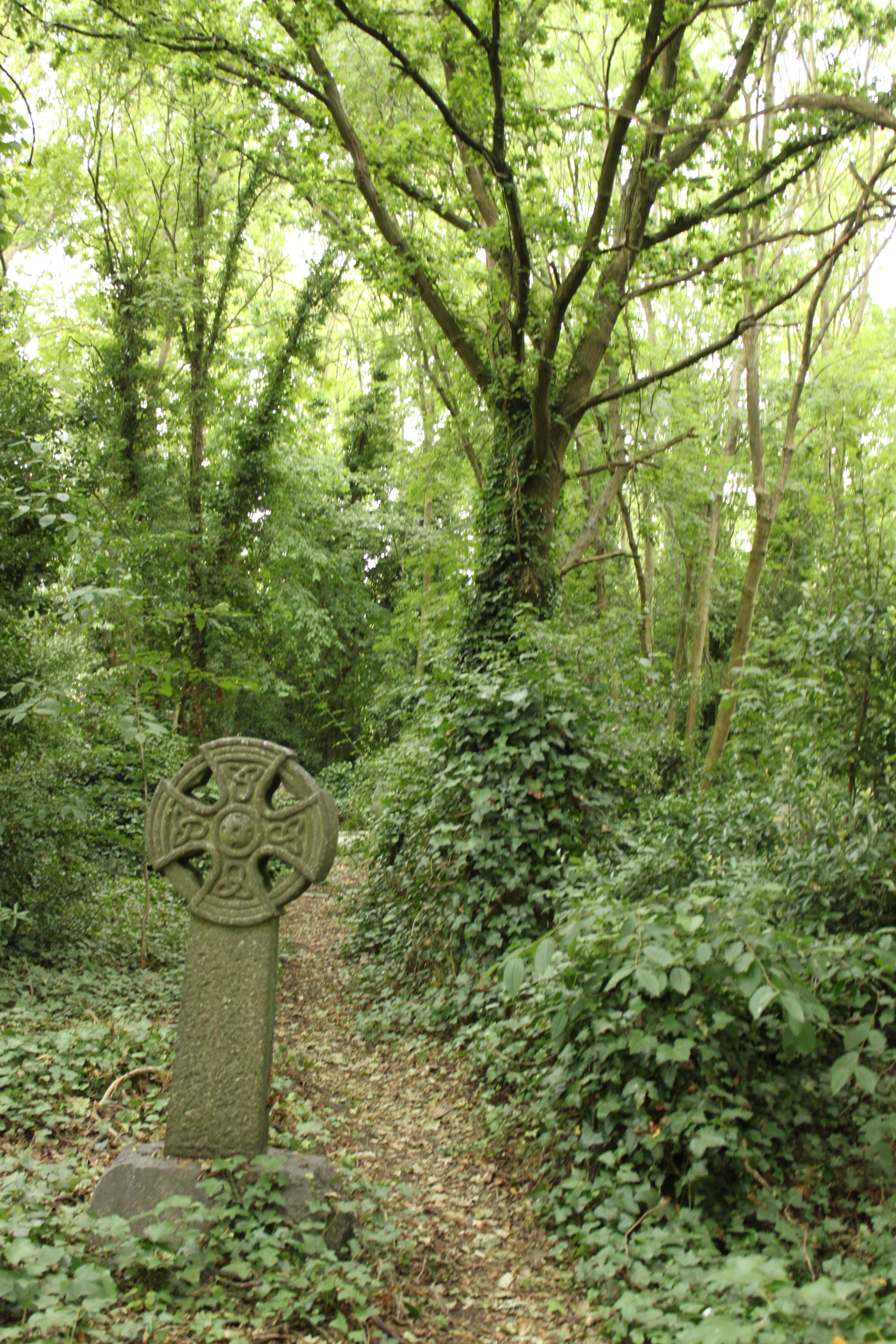
Highgate Cemetery East (2010)

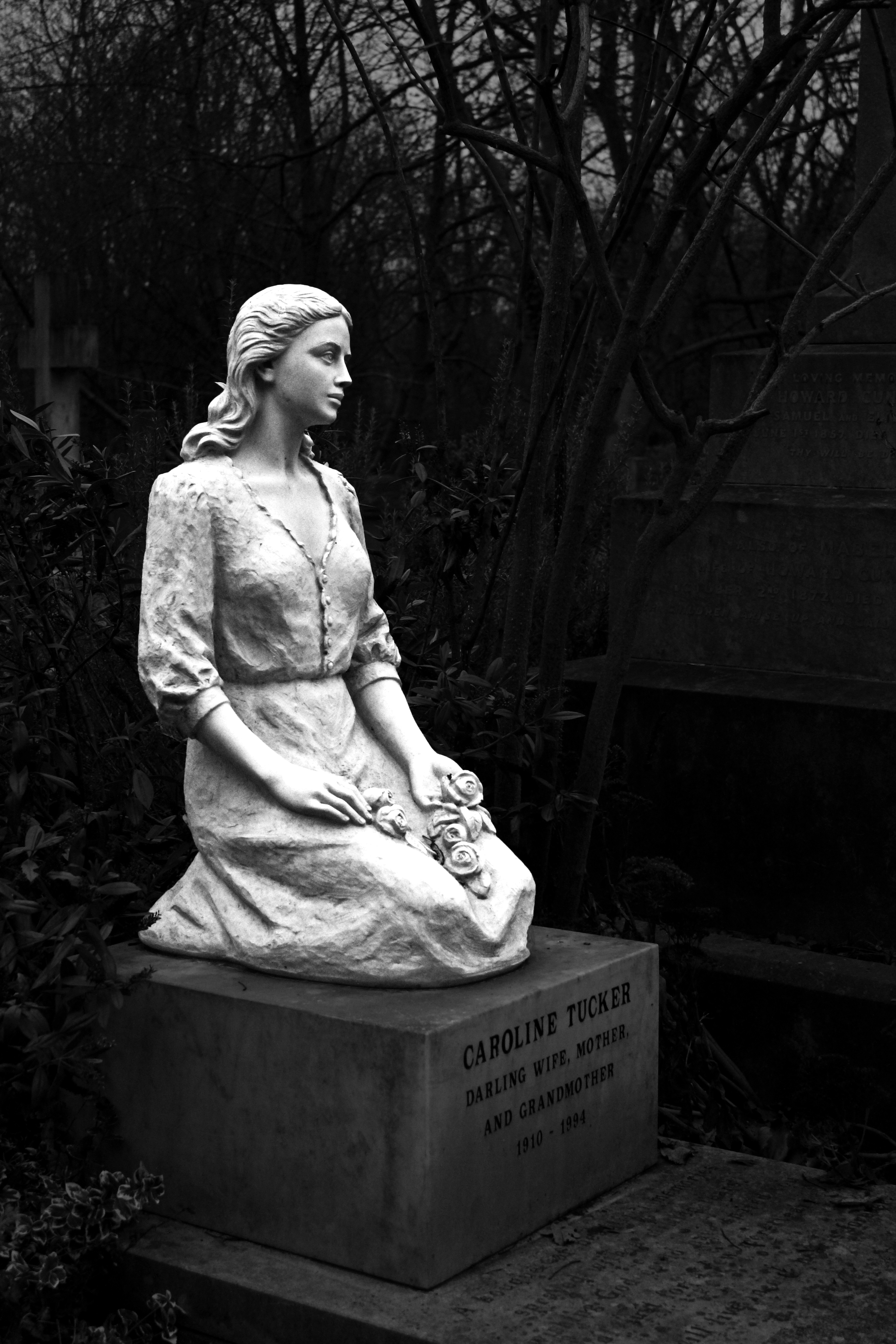
The grave of Caroline Tucker, Highgate Cemetery East

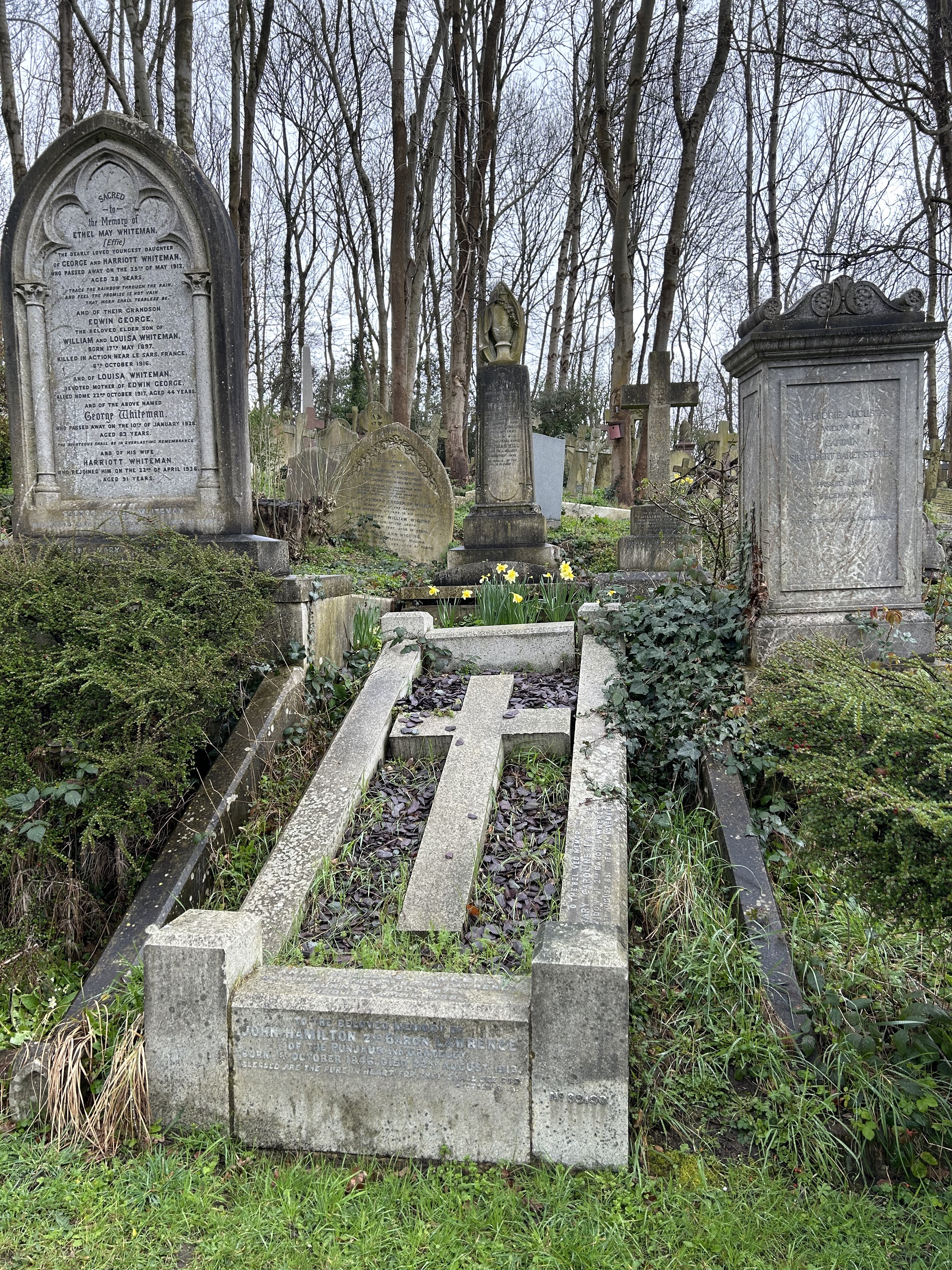
Highgate Cemetery East (2023)

Many famous or prominent people are buried on this side of Highgate cemetery; the most famous of which is perhaps that of Karl Marx, whose tomb was the site of attempted bombings on 2 September 1965 and in 1970. The tomb of Karl Marx is also a Grade I listed building for reasons of historical importance. Fireman's corner is a monument erected in the East side by widows and orphans of members of the London Fire Brigade in 1934. There are 97 firemen buried here. The monument is cared for by the Brigade's Welfare Section.

==== Notable East side interments ====
- David Abbott, advertising executive and founder of Abbott Mead Vickers BBDO who was widely regarded as one of the finest copywriters of his generation.
- Douglas Adams (ashes), author of The Hitchhiker's Guide to the Galaxy and other novels
- Mehmet Aksoy, press officer for the Kurdish YPG, killed by ISIS in 2017
- Wilkie Bard, popular vaudeville and music hall entertainer and recording artist
- Farzad Bazoft, journalist, executed by Saddam Hussein's regime
- Jeremy Beadle (ashes), writer, television presenter and curator of oddities
- Adolf Beck, the Adolph Beck case was a celebrated case of mistaken identity
- Hercules Bellville, American film producer
- William Betty, popular child actor of the early nineteenth century
- Emily Blatchley, pioneering Protestant Christian missionary to China
- Kate Booth, English Salvationist and evangelist. Oldest daughter of William and Catherine Booth. She was also known as la Maréchale
- William Bradbury, printer and publisher and co-founder of Bradbury and Evans
- Frederick Broome, colonial administrator of several British colonies. The Western Australian towns of Broome and Broomehill are named after him
- Neave Brown, American-British architect
- George Barclay Bruce, world renown railway engineer and president of the Institution of Civil Engineers
- Sir Thomas Lauder Brunton, 1st Baronet, Scottish physician who is most closely associated with the treatment of angina pectoris
- James Caird, Scottish agricultural writer and politician
- Patrick Caulfield, painter and printmaker known for his pop art canvasses
- Douglas Cleverdon, radio producer and bookseller
- William Kingdon Clifford (with his wife Lucy), mathematician and philosopher
- Lucy Lane Clifford, novelist and journalist, wife of William Kingdon Clifford
- Yusuf Dadoo, South African anti-apartheid activist
- Lewis Foreman Day, influential artist in the Arts and Crafts movement
- Sir Davison Dalziel, Bt, British newspaper owner and Conservative Party politician. Massive mausoleum near the entrance.
- Elyse Dodgson, theatre producer
- Fritz Dupre, iron and manganese ore merchant, known as the "Manganese Ore King"
- Francis Elgar, naval architect
- George Eliot (Mary Ann Evans – the name on the grave is Mary Ann Cross), novelist, common-law wife of George Henry Lewes and buried next to him
- Edwin Wilkins Field, lawyer who devoted much of his life to law reform
- Paul Foot, campaigning journalist and nephew of former Labour Party leader Michael Foot
- Lydia Folger Fowler, pioneering American physician and first American-born woman to earn a medical degree
- William Foyle, co-founder of Foyles
- Philip French, Observer film critic
- William Friese-Greene, cinema pioneer and his son Claude Friese-Greene
- Lou Gish, actress, daughter of Sheila Gish
- Sheila Gish, actress
- Philip Gould (ashes), British political consultant, and former advertising executive, closely linked to the Labour Party
- Robert Grant VC, soldier and police constable
- Robert Edmond Grant, Professor of Comparative Anatomy at University College London who gave his name to the Grant Museum of Zoology
- Charles Green, the United Kingdom's most famous balloonist of the 19th century
- Leon Griffiths, creator of Minder
- Stuart Hall, Jamaican-born British Marxist sociologist, cultural theorist, and political activist
- Harrison Hayter, railway, harbour and dock engineer
- Mansoor Hekmat, Communist leader and founder of the Worker-Communist Party of Iran and Worker-Communist Party of Iraq
- Eric Hobsbawm (ashes), historian
- Austin Holyoake, printer, publisher, freethinker and brother of the more widely known George Holyoake
- George Holyoake, Birmingham-born social reformer and founder of the Cooperative Movement
- George Honey, popular Victorian actor and comedian
- Alan Howard, actor
- Leslie Hutchinson, Cabaret star of the 1920s and 1930s
- Jabez Inwards, popular Victorian temperance lecturer and phrenologist
- Georges Jacobi, composer and conductor
- Bert Jansch, Scottish folk musician
- Claudia Jones, Trinidadian born Communist and fighter for civil rights, founder of The West Indian Gazette and the Notting Hill Carnival
- George Goodwin Kilburne, genre painter
- David Kirkaldy, Scottish engineer and pioneer in materials testing
- Anatoly Kuznetsov, Soviet writer and author best known for Babi Yar: A Document in the Form of a Novel
- Arthur Leared, Irish physician
- Liza Lehmann, operatic soprano and composer, daughter of Rudolf Lehmann
- Rudolf Lehmann, portrait artist and father of Liza Lehmann
- Andrea Levy (ashes), novelist best known for the novels Small Island and The Long Song
- George Henry Lewes, English philosopher and critic, common law husband of George Eliot and buried next to her.
- Roger Lloyd-Pack, British actor known for Only Fools and Horses and The Vicar of Dibley
- John Lobb, Society bootmaker
- Charles Lucy, British artist, whose most notable painting was The Landing of the Pilgrim Fathers
- Haldane MacFall, art critic, art historian, book illustrator and novelist
- Anna Mahler, sculptor and daughter of Gustav Mahler and Alma Schindler
- Chris Martin, Principal Private Secretary to the Prime Minister
- James Martineau, religious philosopher influential in the history of Unitarianism
- Karl Marx, philosopher, historian, sociologist and economist (memorial after his reburial, with other family members)
- Frank Matcham, theatre architect
- Carl Mayer, Austro-German screenwriter of The Cabinet of Doctor Caligari and Sunrise: A Song of Two Humans
- Thomas McKinnon Wood, Liberal politician and Secretary of State for Scotland
- Malcolm McLaren, punk impresario and original manager of the Sex Pistols
- Alexander Michie, Scottish author, journalist, traveler, and businessman in China
- Ralph Miliband, left wing political theorist, father of David Miliband and Ed Miliband
- Alan Milward, influential historian
- William Henry Monk, composer (of the music to Abide with Me)
- Charles Morton, music hall and theatre manager who became known as the Father of the Halls
- Sidney Nolan, Australian artist
- George Josiah Palmer, founder and editor of Church Times
- Charles J. Phipps, theatre architect
- Tim Pigott-Smith, actor
- Dachine Rainer, poet and anarchist
- Corin Redgrave, actor and political activist
- Bruce Reynolds, criminal, mastermind of the Great Train Robbery (1963)
- Ralph Richardson, actor
- George Richmond, painter and portraitist
- José Carlos Rodrigues, Brazilian journalist, financial expert, and philanthropist
- Ernestine Rose, suffragist, abolitionist and freethinker
- James Samuel Risien Russell, Guyanese-British physician, neurologist, professor of medicine, and professor of medical jurisprudence
- Raphael Samuel, Marxist historian
- Anthony Shaffer, playwright, screenwriter and novelist
- Peter Shaffer, playwright and screenwriter
- Sir Eyre Massey Shaw, first Chief Officer of the Metropolitan Fire Brigade
- Alan Sillitoe, English postmodern novelist, poet, and playwright
- James Smetham, Pre-Raphaelite Brotherhood painter, engraver and follower of Dante Gabriel Rossetti
- Sir Donald Alexander Smith, Canadian railway financier and diplomat
- Herbert Spencer, evolutionary biologist, sociologist, and laissez-faire economic philosopher
- Sir Leslie Stephen, critic, first editor of the Dictionary of National Biography, father of Virginia Woolf and Vanessa Bell, members of the Bloomsbury Group
- Julia Prinsep Stephen, Pre-Raphaelite model and mother of Virginia Woolf and Vanessa Bell, members of the Bloomsbury Group.
- William Heath Strange, physician and founder of the Hampstead General Hospital, now the Royal Free Hospital
- Lucien Stryk, American poet, teacher and translator of Zen poetry
- Thomas Tate, mathematician and scientific educator and writer
- Sir George Thalben-Ball, English organist, choirmaster and composer
- Bob Thoms, the greatest Victorian cricket umpire
- James Thomson, Victorian poet, best known for The City of Dreadful Night
- Storm Thorgerson, graphic designer
- Malcolm Tierney, actor
- Feliks Topolski, Polish-born British expressionist painter
- Edward Truelove, radical publisher and freethinker
- Peter Ucko, influential English archaeologist
- Varvara de Vesselitsky, pioneer social researcher
- Max Wall, comedian and entertainer
- Simon Ward, actor
- Peter Cathcart Wason, pioneering psychologist
- Sir Lawrence Weaver, architectural writer, editor of Country Life and organiser of the British Empire Exhibition
- Opal Whiteley, American writer
- Colin St John Wilson, architect (most notably of the new British Library in London), lecturer and author
- Joseph Wolf, natural history illustrator and pioneer in wildlife art
- Edward Richard Woodham, survivor of the Charge of the Light Brigade
- Michael Young, Baron Young of Dartington, politician, social activist and consumer champion.

=== War graves ===
The cemetery contains the graves of 318 Commonwealth service personnel maintained and registered by the Commonwealth War Graves Commission, in both the East and West sides, 259 from the First World War and 59 from the Second. Those whose graves could not be marked by headstones are listed on a Screen Wall memorial erected near the Cross of Sacrifice in the west side.

== In popular culture ==
Highgate Cemetery was featured in the popular media from the 1960s to the late 1980s for its so-called occult past, particularly as being the alleged site of the "Highgate Vampire".

- Several of John Galsworthy's Forsyte Saga novels refer to Highgate Cemetery as the last resting place of the Forsytes; for example, Chapter XI, "The Last of the Forsytes", in To Let (1921).
- Footage of Highgate appears in numerous British horror films, including Taste the Blood of Dracula (1970), Tales from the Crypt (1972) and From Beyond the Grave (1974).
- In That's Your Funeral (1972), the route taken in the Hearse Drivers' Grand Prix is mentioned as going "from Golders Green to Woking via Karl Marx's grave in Highgate".
- In Len Deighton's alternative history novel SS-GB and its TV adaptation, a bomb is detonated in the tomb of Karl Marx when his remains are exhumed by German occupation forces to be presented to the Soviet Union.
- Audrey Niffenegger's book Her Fearful Symmetry (2009) is set around Highgate Cemetery; she acted as a tour guide there while researching the book.
- In the novel Double or Die (2007), a part of the Young Bond series, Ludwig and Wolfgang Smith plan to kill Bond in the cemetery.
- Tracy Chevalier's book Falling Angels (2002) was set in and around Highgate Cemetery.
- The film Hampstead (2017) features some scenes in the cemetery.
- Robert Galbraith's sixth Cormoran Strike novel The Ink Black Heart (2022) revolves around a fictional cartoon set in Highgate Cemetery.

== Gallery ==
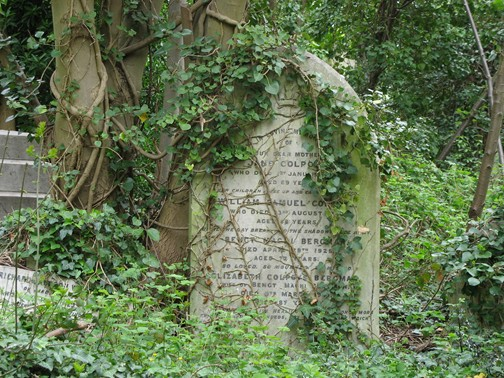

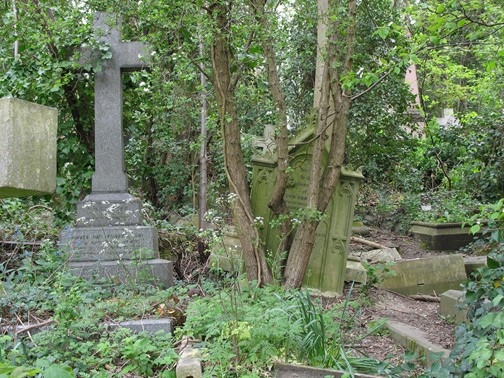

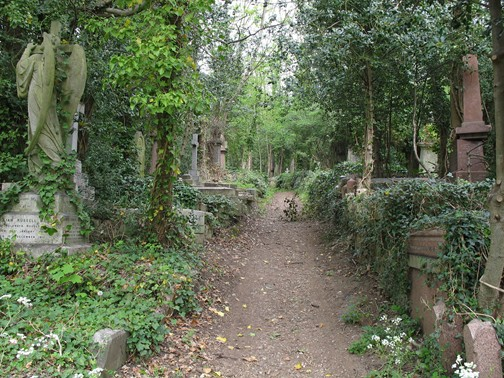

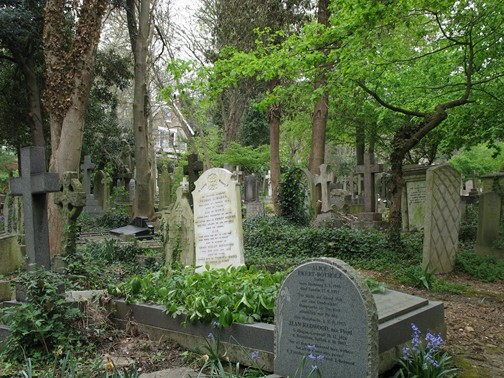

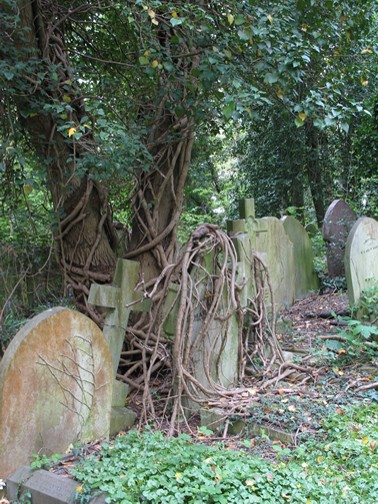

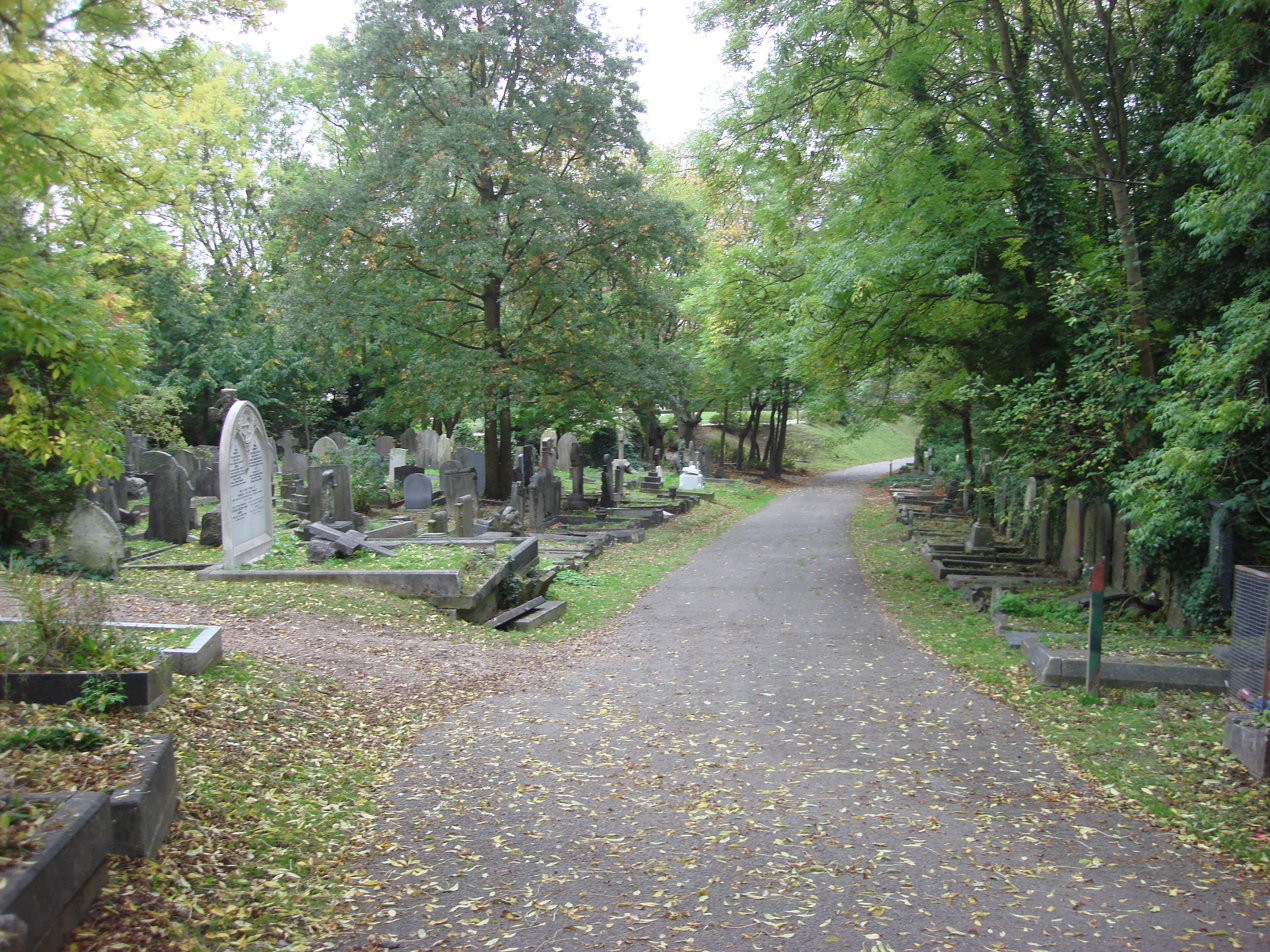

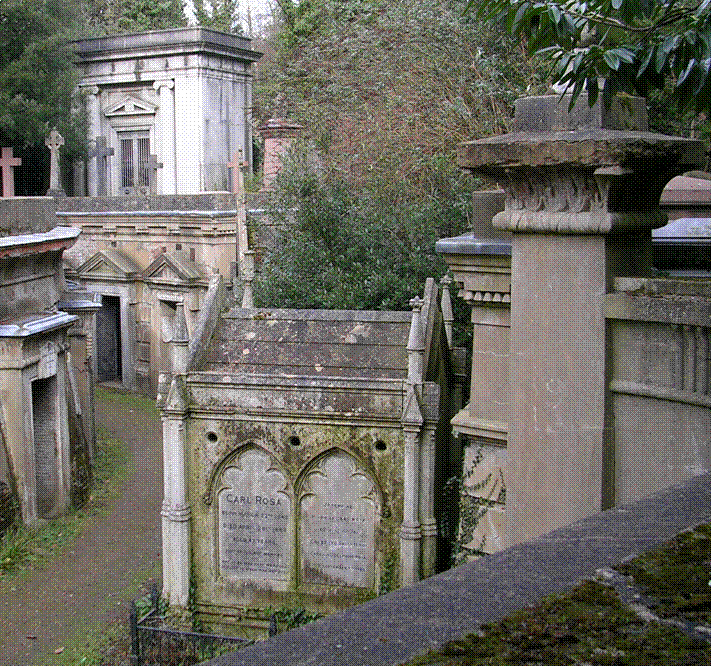
The grave of Carl Rosa

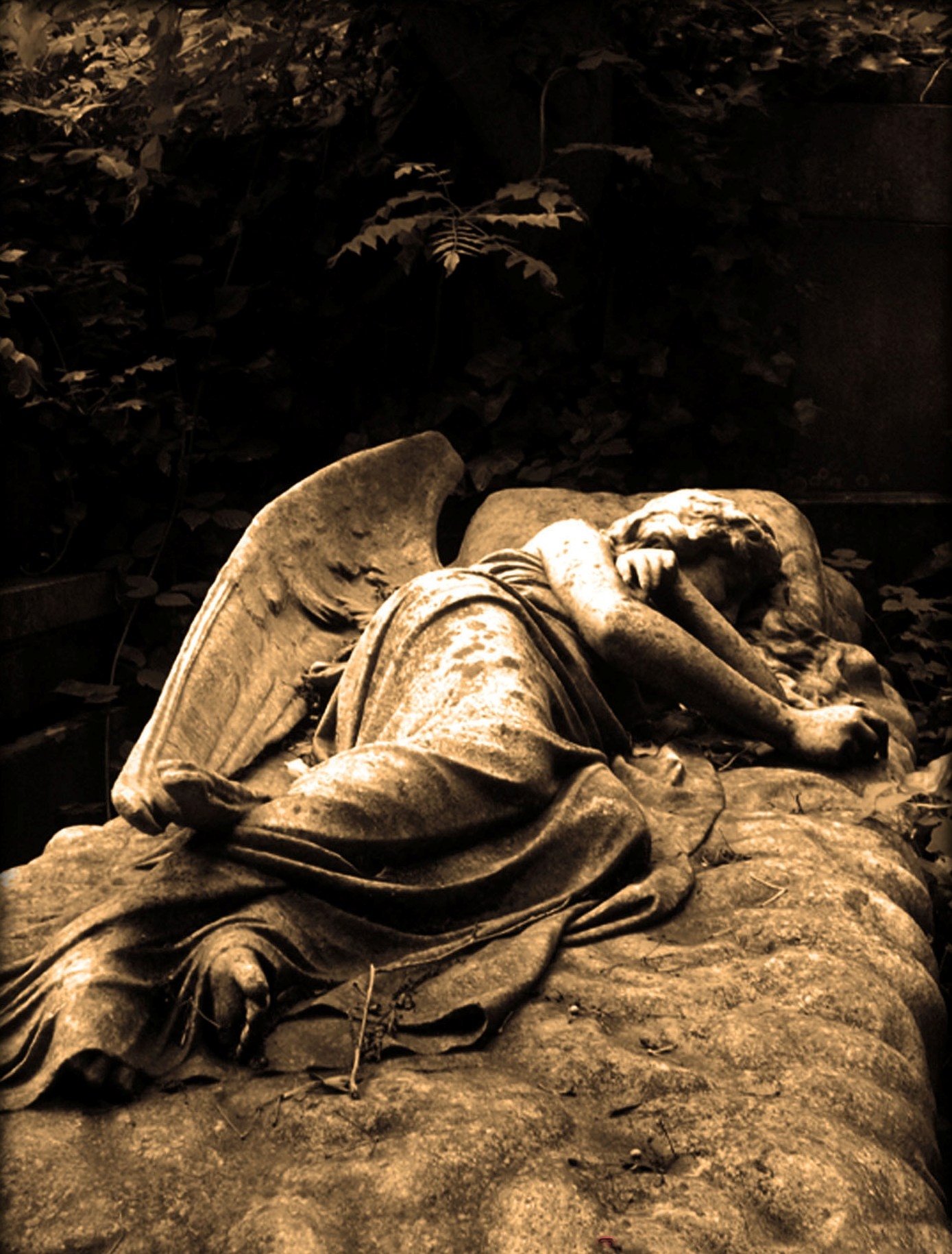
Mary Nichols' family grave and The Sleeping Angel, Highgate Cemetery

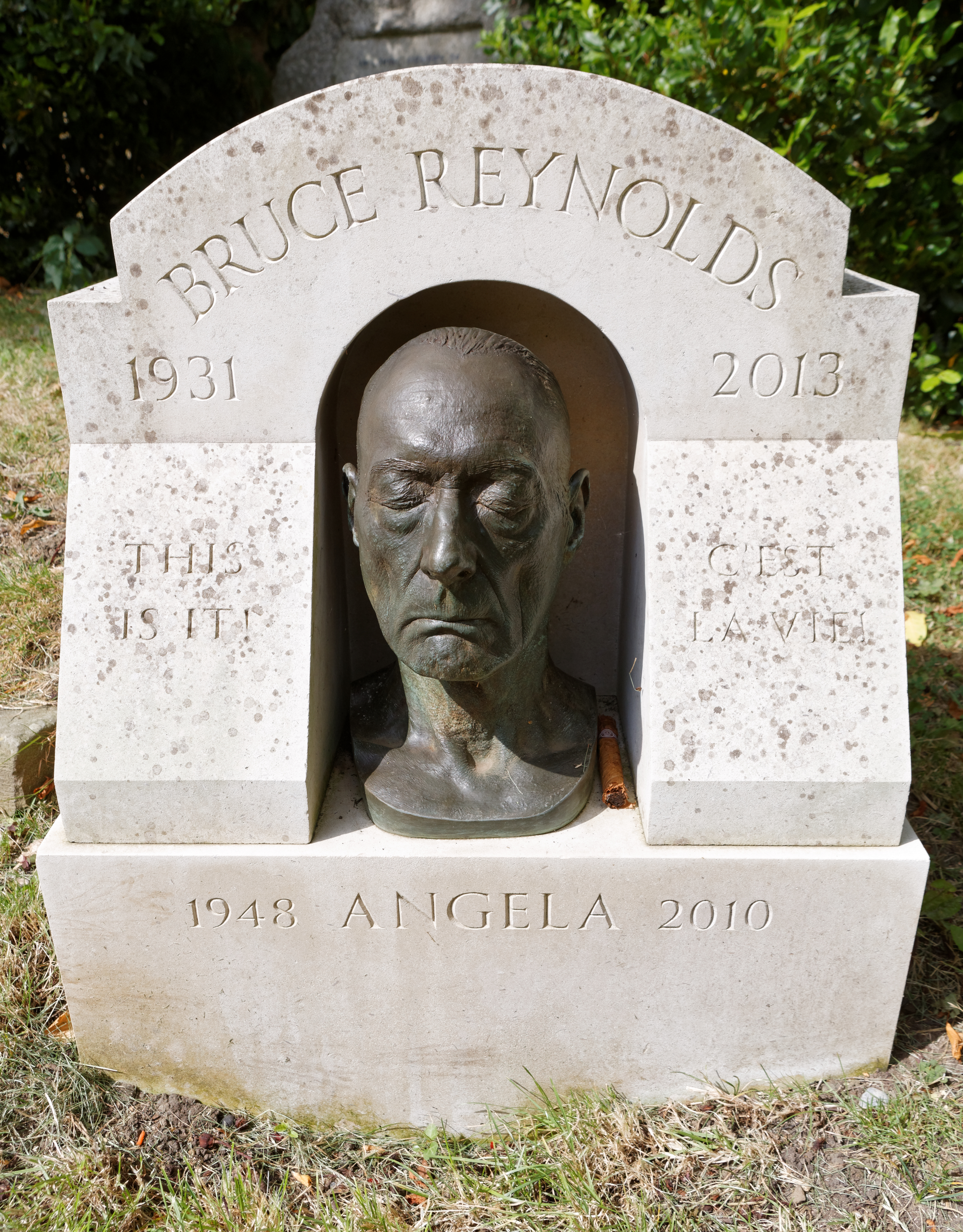
The grave of Bruce Reynolds

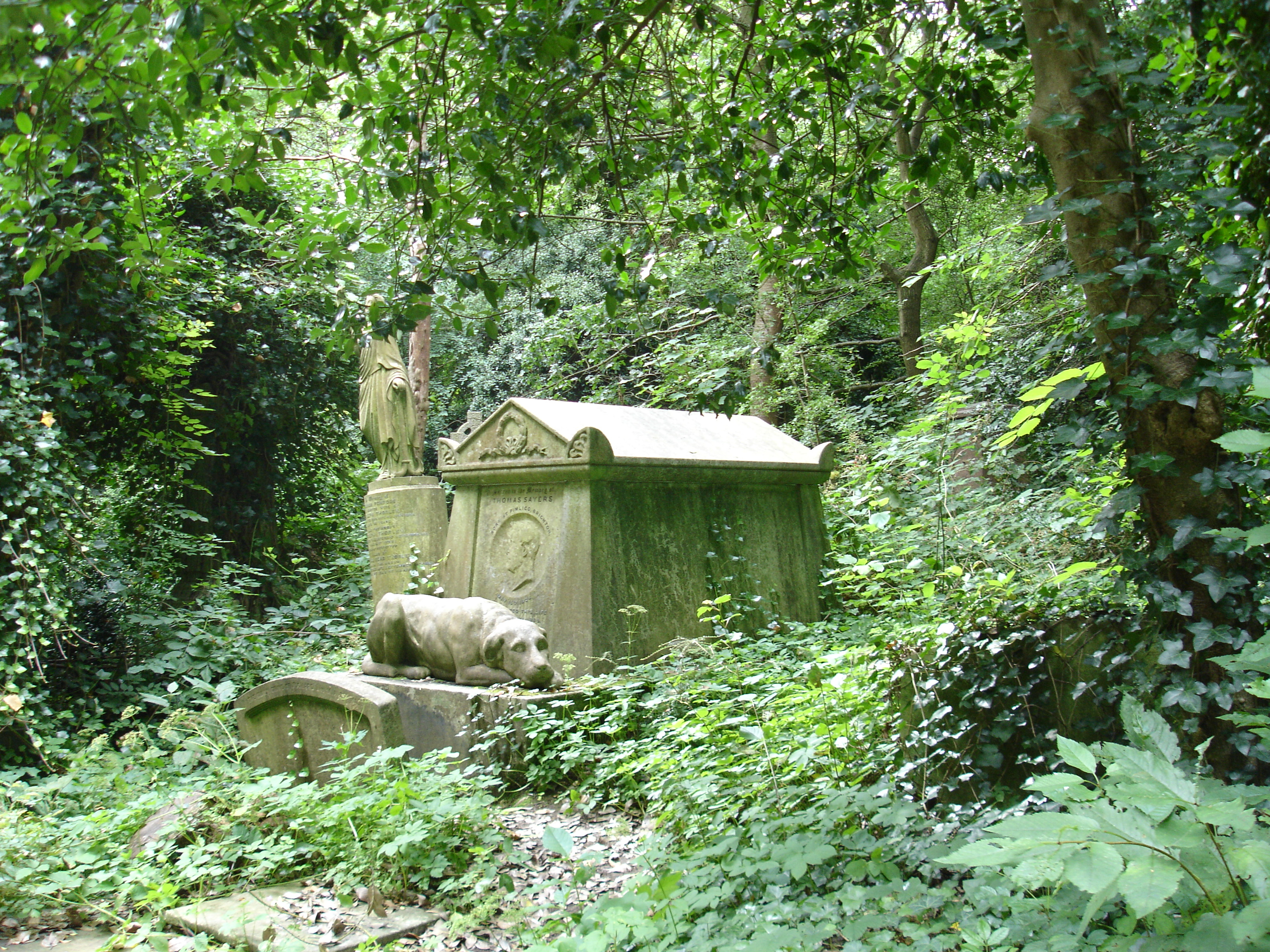
The tomb of Tom Sayers

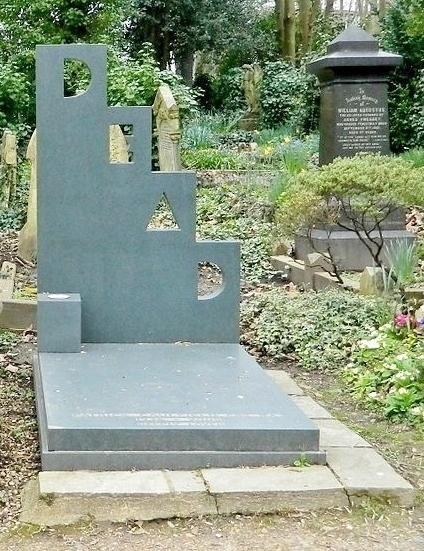
The grave of Patrick Caulfield

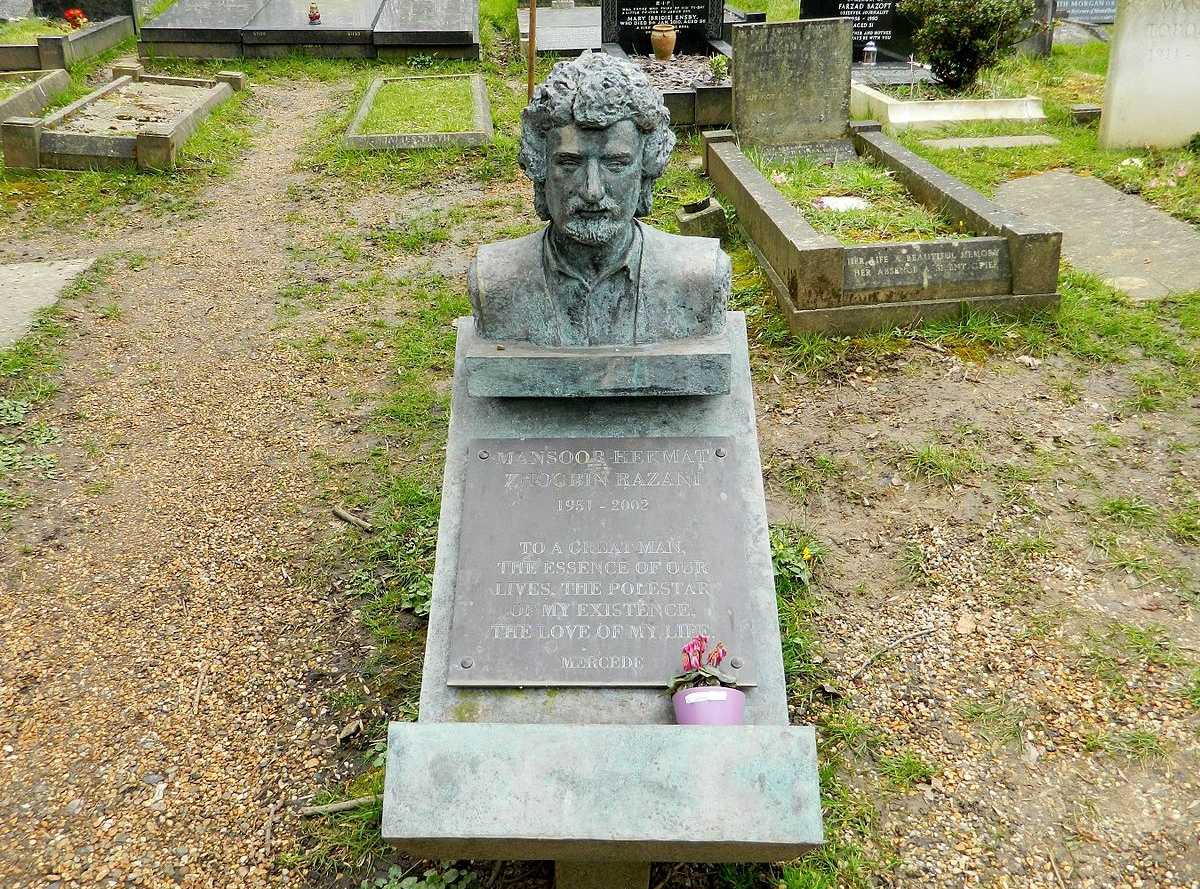
The grave of Mansoor Hekmat

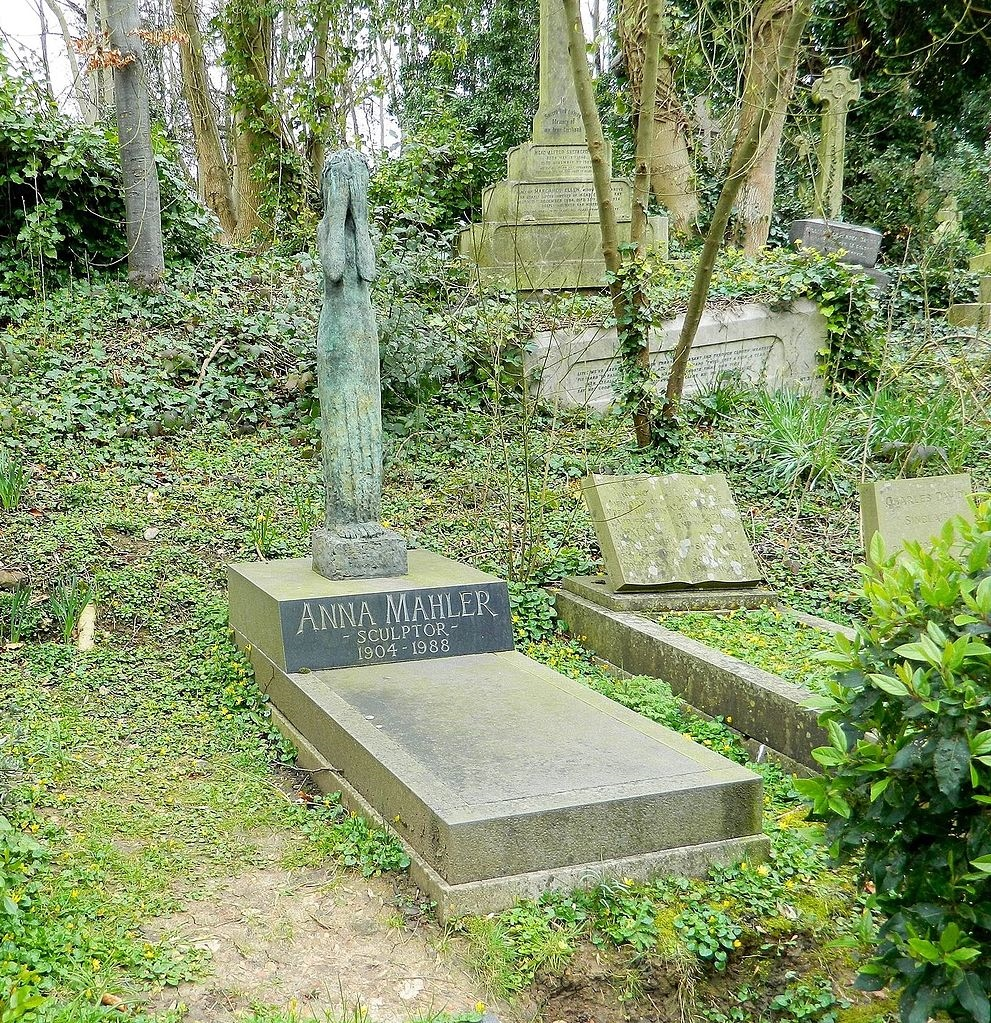
The grave of Anna Mahler

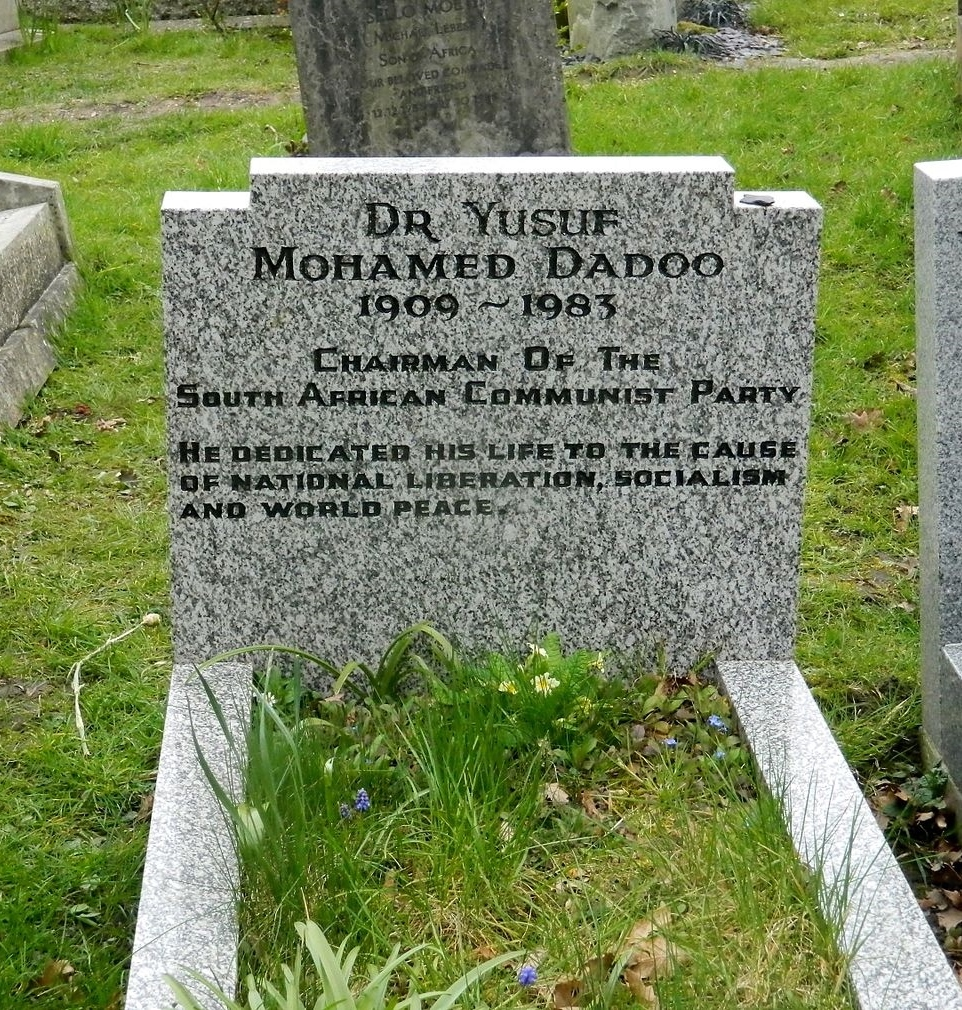
The grave of Yusuf Dadoo

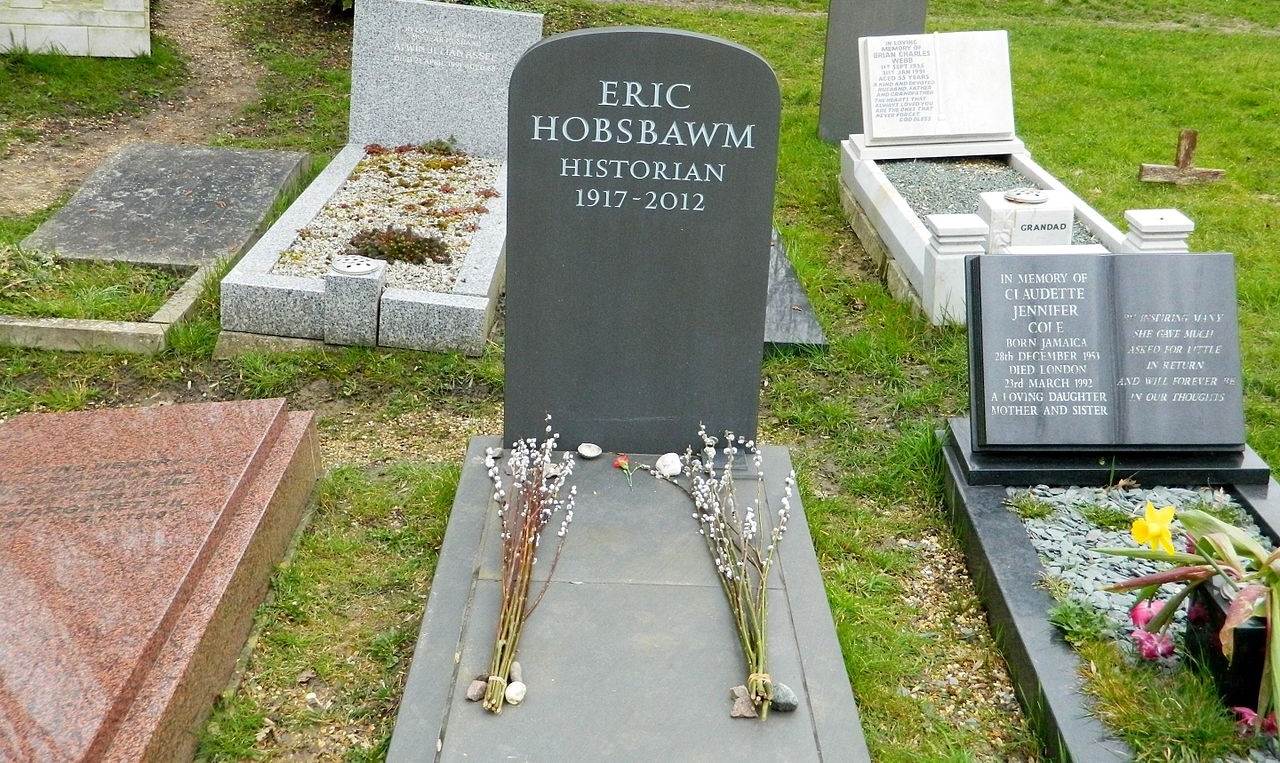
The grave of Eric Hobsbawm

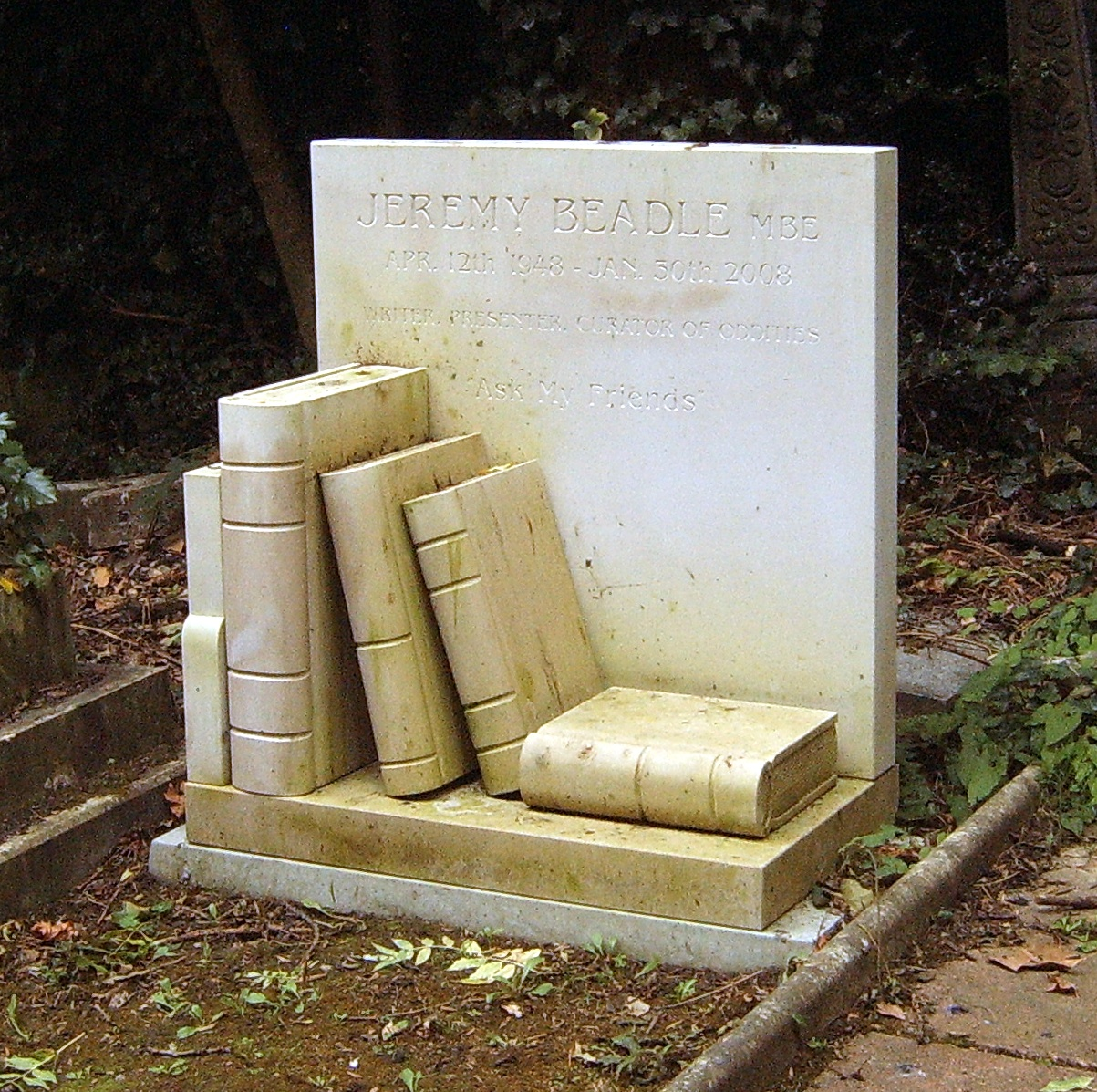
The grave of Jeremy Beadle

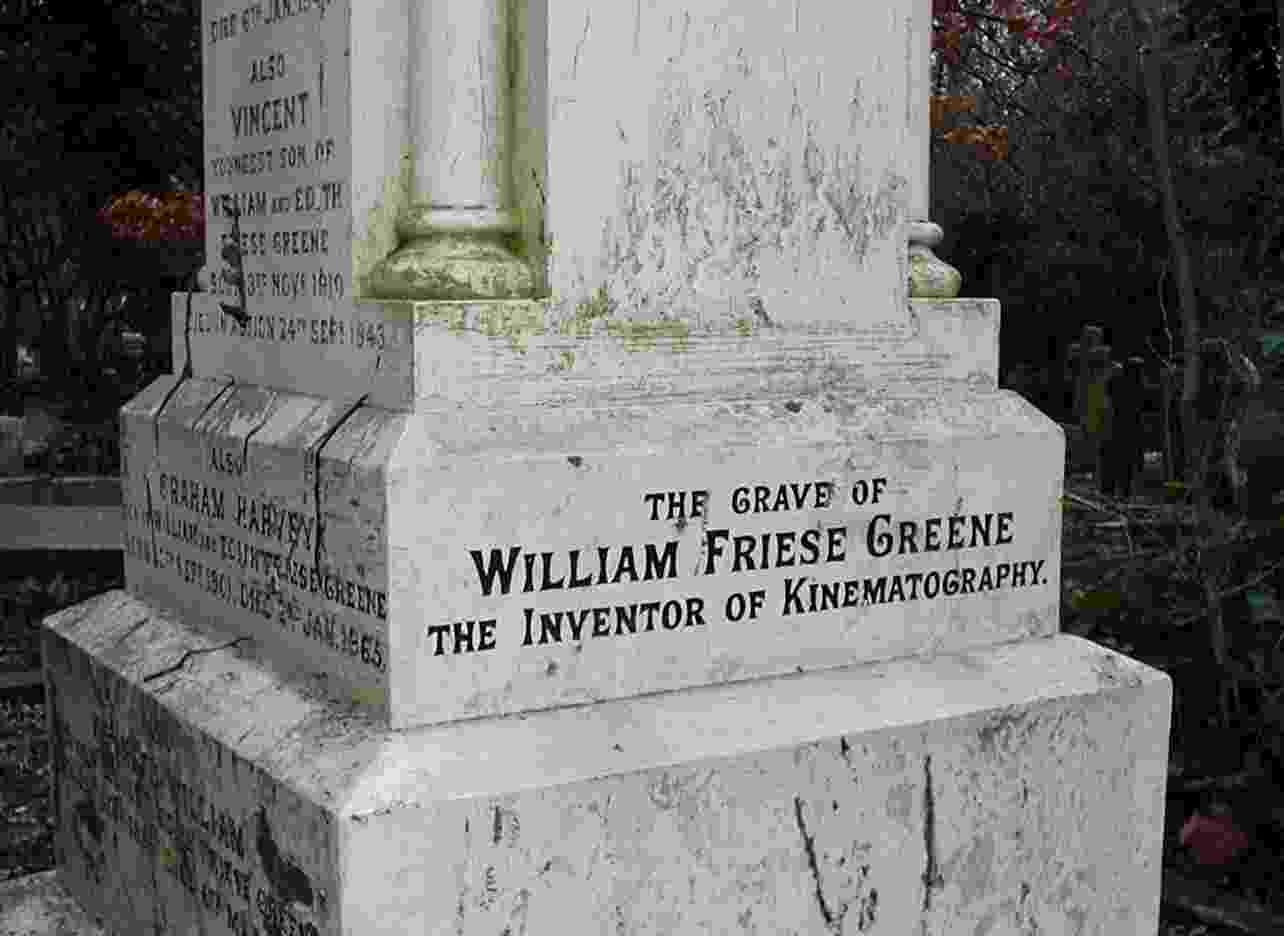
The grave of William Friese-Greene, designed by English architect Edwin Lutyens, in East Cemetery

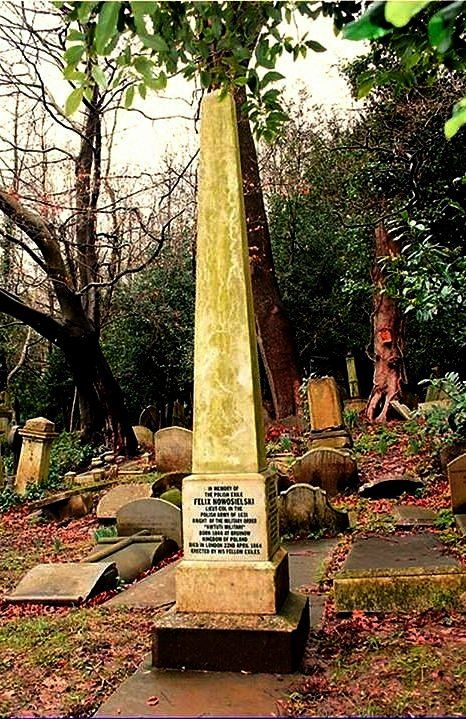
Obelisk dedicated to Feliks Nowosielski, member of the homonymous Polish noble family, on White Eagle Hill
