= Austin Holyoake =

English publisher (1826–1874)

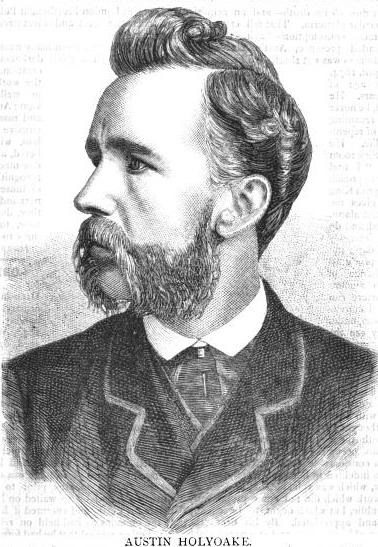
- Born: 27 October 1826; Birmingham, England
- Died: 10 April 1874 (aged 47); London, England
- Resting place: Highgate Cemetery
- Occupations: Printer and publisher
- Organizations: Reform League; National Secular Society
- Known for: Secularist activism
- Spouses: Lucy Pettigrew (?–1855); Jane Baker (1858–1874)

Austin Holyoake (27 October 1826 – 10 April 1874) was a printer, publisher, and freethinker. The younger brother and partner of the more widely known George Jacob Holyoake, Austin Holyoake was himself a significant figure in nineteenth century secularism.

== Life ==
Austin Holyoake was born in Birmingham on 27 October 1826 to George Holyoake (a printer) and his wife Catherine Groves (a horn-button maker). Taking an early interest in the ideas of Robert Owen and the Owenite movement, Holyoake worked for various radical papers as a printer in Birmingham and London, before taking charge of printing The Reasoner (his brother George Jacob's periodical) in 1847. The two brothers entered into a partnership, acquiring their own premises at 147 Fleet Street in 1853.

At these premises, known as Fleet Street House, The Reasoner was produced and Austin Holyoake acted as secretary. Edward Royle describes how

The work of the Fleet Street House was divided into three business departments. In 1856 these were Publishing, under Frederick Farrah; the News Agency, under Thomas Wilks; and Printing, under John Watts. [George Jacob] Holyoake was the Director, and his brother Austin, secretary and general assistant...The printing and publishing business was taken over by Austin in 1859, lapsed in 1862 when the Fleet Street House was sold, but was revived as 'Austin & Co.' at 17 Johnson's Court in 1864. This business then passed successively to Charles Watts, Charles Albert Watts and the Rationalist Press Association.

Austin Holyoake was a member of multiple radical and reformist groups, including the Reform League, and the author of many tracts and pamphlets. A member of the Association for the Repeal of Taxes on Knowledge, he was the last printer in England prosecuted under the Newspaper Stamp Act. Holyoake was sub-editor of Charles Bradlaugh's National Reformer from 1866 to his death, also co-editing with Bradlaugh the Secular Almanac. The two were 'intimate friends and co-workers.' Holyoake was a vice-president, and the first treasurer, of the National Secular Society, founded by Bradlaugh in 1866. Though he did lecture for the secularist movement on occasion, much of Holyoake's work was undertaken behind the scenes:

Austin was, said the Secular Chronicle in 1872, 'one of those quiet, unostentatious workers who are the real bone and sinew of the Secular body - like the stage manager, without whose work the play would be incomplete, but who seldom comes before the curtain to receive the plaudits of the audience.'

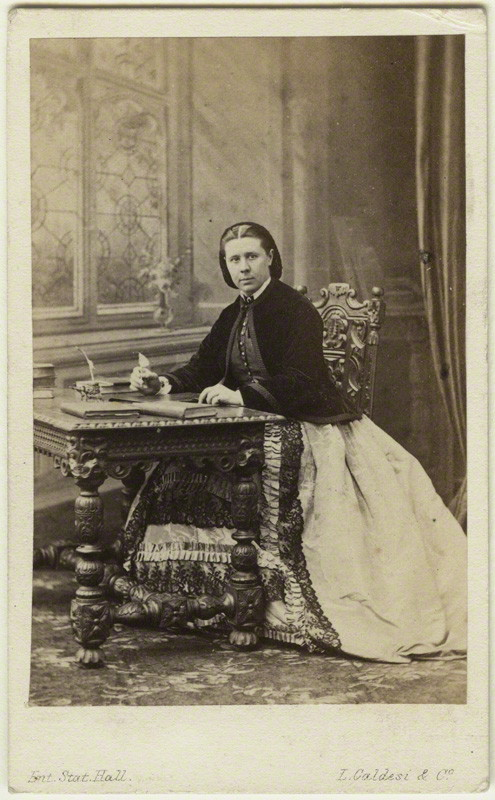
Emily Faithfull, who Holyoake instructed in printing techniques.

In 1859, he assisted the founders of the Society for Promoting the Employment of Women in establishing the suitability of printing as an occupation for women. His employment by Bessie Parkes and Emily Faithfull for this purpose, helped to pave the way for Faithfull's Victoria Press at Great Coram Street, London, which opened in 1860.

== Family ==
Holyoake's first wife, Lucy Pettigrew, died in childbirth in 1855 after four years of marriage. He married his second wife, Jane Baker, in 1858 and had a son and a daughter. Jane was a professional singer, who performed under the name Alice Austin.

== Death and legacy ==
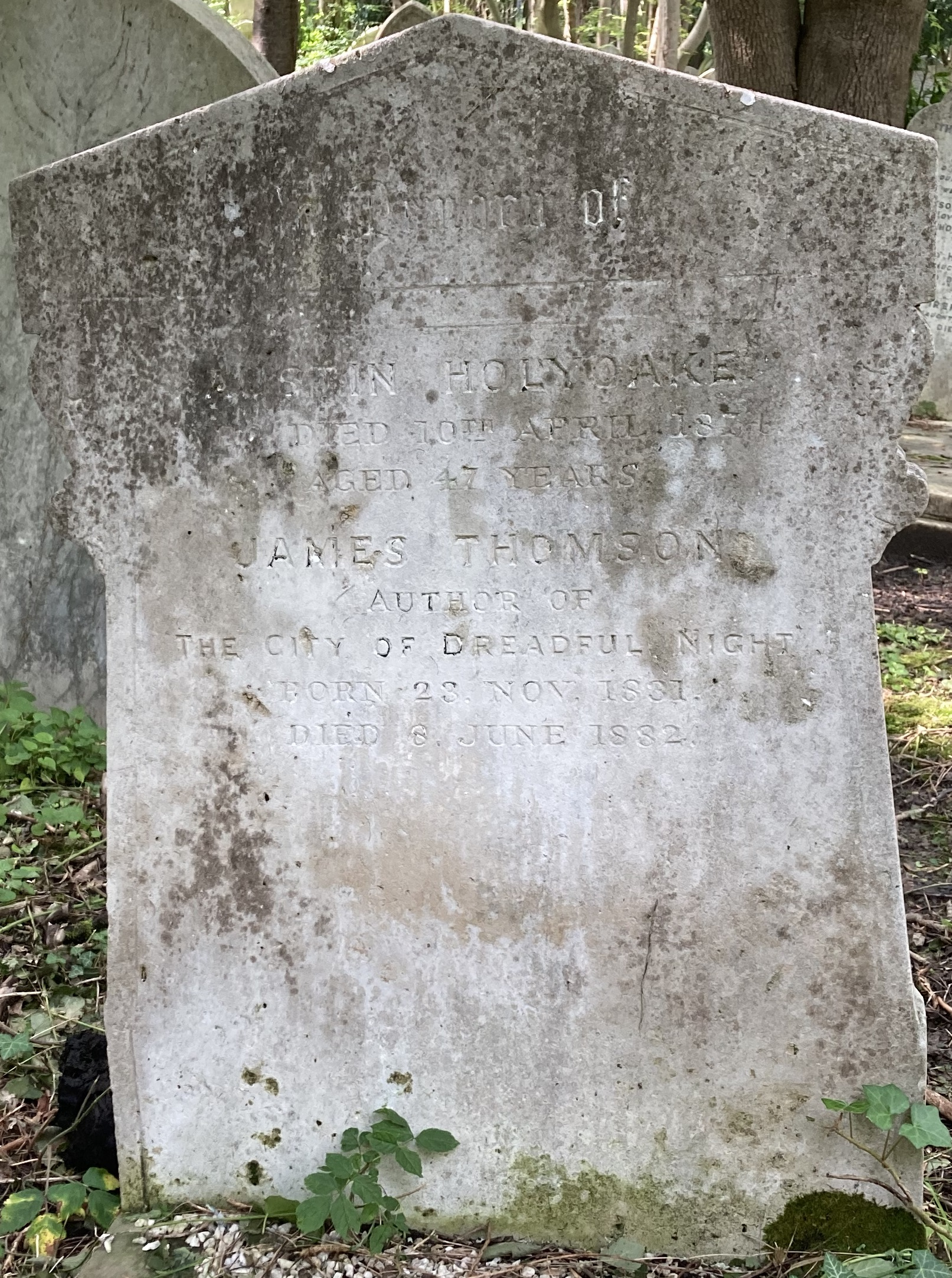
Grave of Austin Holyoake in Highgate Cemetery

Austin Holyoake died, aged 47, from consumption on 10 April 1874 at Johnson's Court, and was buried on the eastern side of Highgate Cemetery with the secular service he had composed. His close friend, the poet James Thomson was buried in the same grave eight years later.

Along with its announcement of his death, The National Reformer printed Holyoake's 'Thoughts in the Sick-Room', which stated his continuing absence of belief in any god or afterlife:

As I have stated before, my mind being free from any doubts on these bewildering matters of speculation, I have experienced for twenty years the most perfect mental repose; and now I find that the near approach of death, the 'grim King of Terrors,' gives me not the slightest alarm.

In 1878 The Secular Chronicle printed a profile of Holyoake, written by Harriet Law, describing 'a career of usefulness cut short'. During a debate in the House of Lords in 1876, the Marquess of Salisbury used the example of Holyoake's service as a warning about changing the rules concerning nonconformist burials

I hold in my hand a burial service by Austin Holyoake, one of the first sentences of which is directed towards a repudiation of the doctrine of immortality. I may quote a single verse from a hymn - "parsons may preach and the fanatics rave / Of existence beyond the dark grave. / Their heaven, they say, is far up above, / But mine is on earth, and I call it Love."

Large or Small Families, a pamphlet by Austin Holyoake

In 1882, Holyoake's close friend, the poet James Thomson, was buried in the same grave with an adaptation of the burial service written by, and given for, Holyoake.

== Bibliography ==
- Does there exist a moral governor of the universe? An argument against the alleged universal benevolence in nature (1870)
- Thoughts on Atheism, or, Can Man by Searching Find out God? (1870)
- Large or Small Families? On which Side Lies the Balance of Comfort? (1870)
- Secularist's Manual of Songs and Ceremonies, ed. (1871)
- The Book of Esther: a specimen of what passes as the inspired word of God (1873)
- Would a Republican Form of Government be Suitable to England? (1873)
- 'In Favour of Atheism' in The National Secular Society's Almanack (1874)
