= James Thomson (poet, born 1834) =

Scottish journalist, poet, and translator (1834–1882)

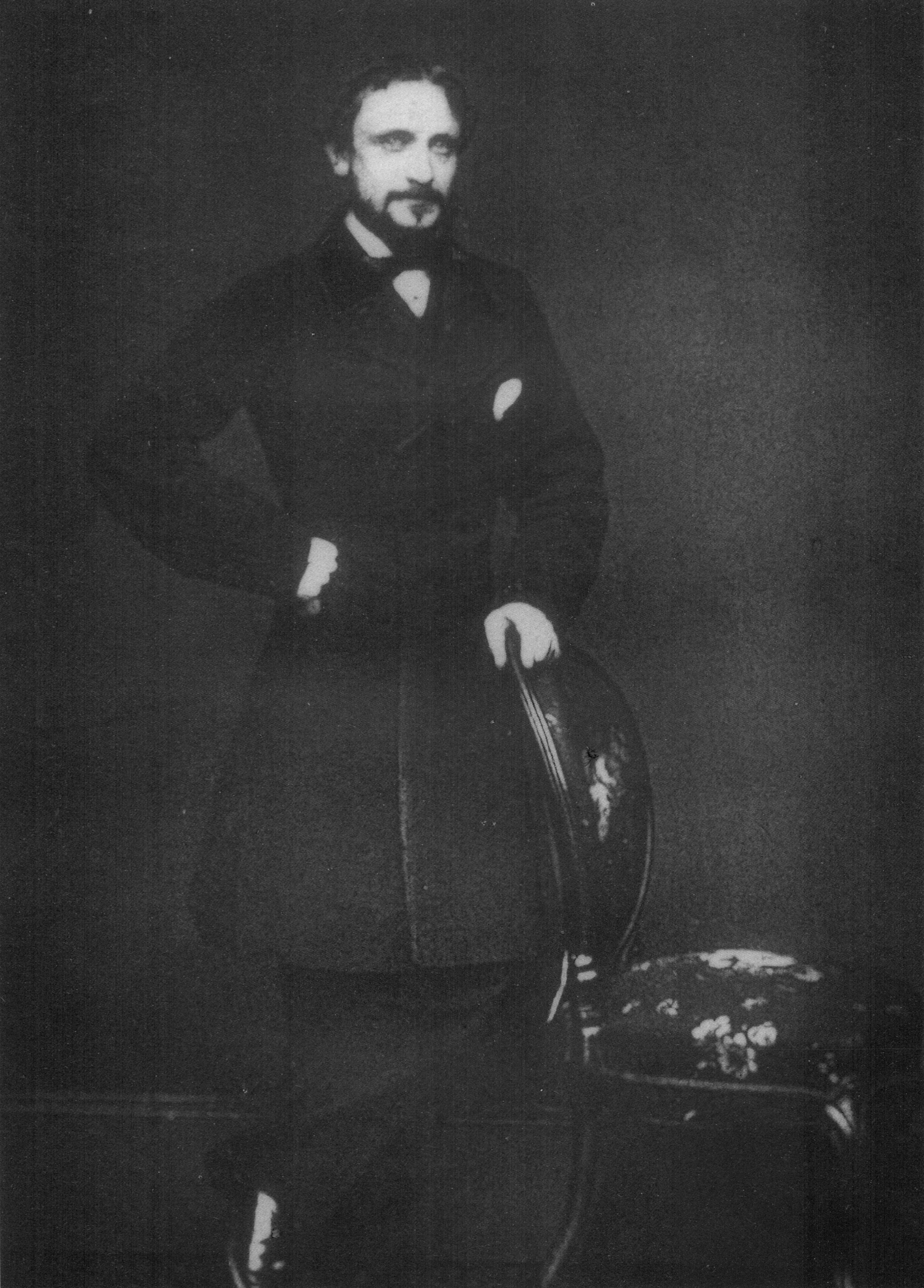
- Thomson in 1860
- Born: 23 November 1834; Port Glasgow, Scotland
- Died: 3 June 1882 (aged 47); London, England
- Education: Royal Military Asylum
- Writing career
- Pen name: Bysshe Vanolis
- Period: 1863–1882
- Notable work: The City of Dreadful Night

James Thomson (23 November 1834 – 3 June 1882), who wrote under the name Bysshe Vanolis, was a Scottish journalist, poet, and translator. He is remembered for The City of Dreadful Night (1874; 1880), a poetic allegory of urban suffering and despair. His pen name derives from the names of the poets Shelley and Novalis; both strong influences on him as a writer. Thomson's essays were written mainly for National Reformer, Secular Review, and Cope's Tobacco Plant. His longer poems include "The Doom of a City" (1854) in four parts, "Vane's Story" (1865), and the Orientalist ballad "Weddah and Om-El-Bonain". He admired and translated the works of the Italian poet Giacomo Leopardi and Heinrich Heine. In the title of his biography of Thomson, Bertram Dobell dubbed him "the Laureate of Pessimism".

== Life ==
Thomson was born in Port Glasgow, Scotland, and, at the age of eight (after his sister died and his father suffered a stroke), he was sent to London where he was raised in an orphanage, the Royal Caledonian Asylum on Chalk Road (later Caledonian Road after the asylum) near Holloway. At around this time, his mother died.

He was trained as an army schoolmaster at the Royal Military Asylum in Chelsea and served in Ireland, where in 1851, at the age of 17, he made the acquaintance of 18-year-old Charles Bradlaugh, who was already known as a freethinker, having published his first atheist pamphlet a year earlier.

More than a decade later, Thomson quit the military and moved to London, where he worked as a clerk. He remained in communication with Bradlaugh, who was by now issuing his own weekly National Reformer, a "publication for the working man". For the remaining 19 years of his life, starting in 1863, Thomson submitted stories, essays and poems to the National Reformer and other periodicals. From 1866 onwards he lived in a single room, first in Pimlico and then in Bloomsbury.

Thomson's most famous literary work, the poem The City of Dreadful Night, was composed from January 1870 to October 1873. It was first published in serial form in the National Reformer in the spring of 1874. The poem was reprinted in The City of Dreadful Night and Other Poems (1880) and elicited encouraging and complimentary reviews from a number of critics.

Thomson died in London at the age of 47, from a broken blood vessel in his bowel, and was buried in the east side of Highgate Cemetery in the grave of his friend, the freethinker, Austin Holyoake. The inscription on his grave states that he was born in 1831, not 1834.

== Legacy ==
In 1889, seven years after Thomson's death, Henry Stephens Salt published the first biography of Thomson, with a selection of writings, The Life of James Thomson ("B.V."). In 1910, Bertram Dobell published a second biography, The Laureate of Pessimism: a Sketch of the Life of James Thomson. In 1993, Tom Leonard's biographical study Places of the Mind: The Life and Work of James Thomson ('B. V.') of Thomson was published by the London publisher Jonathan Cape. In recent years, Thomson's poems have rarely been anthologised, although the autobiographical "Insomnia" and "Sunday at Hampstead" have been well-regarded and include some striking passages.

== Selected publications ==
- The City of Dreadful Night and Other Poems (1880)
- Vane's Story, Weddah and Om-el-Bonain, and Other Poems (1881)
- Essays and Phantasies (1881)
- Satires and Profanities (1884; with preface by George William Foote)
- A Voice from the Nile, and Other Poems (1884; with memoir by Bertram Dobell)
- Shelley, a Poem: With Other Writings Relating to Shelley, to Which Is Added An Essay on the Poems of William Blake (1884; with preface by Bertram Dobell)
- Selections from Original Contributions by James Thomson to "Cope's Tobacco Plant." (1889; with preface by Walter Lewin)
- Poems, Essays and Fragments (1892; edited, with preface, by J. M. Robertson)
- The Poetical Works of James Thomson: The City of Dreadful Night, Vane's story, Weddah & Om-el-Bonain, Voice from the Nile & Poetical Remains, Vol. I / Vol. II (1895; edited, with memoir, by Bertram Dobell)
- Biographical and Critical Studies (1896; with preface by Bertram Dobell)
- Walt Whitman: The Man and the Poet (1910; with introduction by Bertram Dobell)
- Poems and Some Letters Ed. Anne Ridler. London: Centaur Press, 1963.
- The City of Dreadful Night. Introduction by Edwin Morgan. London: Canongate, 1993.
- Novalis and the Poets of Pessimism: With an English Translation by James Thomson ("B.V.") of Hymns to Night, edited by Simon Reynolds, Norwich, Norfolk: Michael Russell, 1995.
- The Complete Poems. Ed. A. J. Spatz. Arlington, VA: Charles & Wonder, 2012.
- The City of Dreadful Night and Other Writings. Seattle: Sublunary Editions, 2022.
- The City of Dreadful Night. Illustrations by Shannon Cleere, afterword by Robert Lashley. Seattle: Entre Rios, 2023.

== Gallery ==
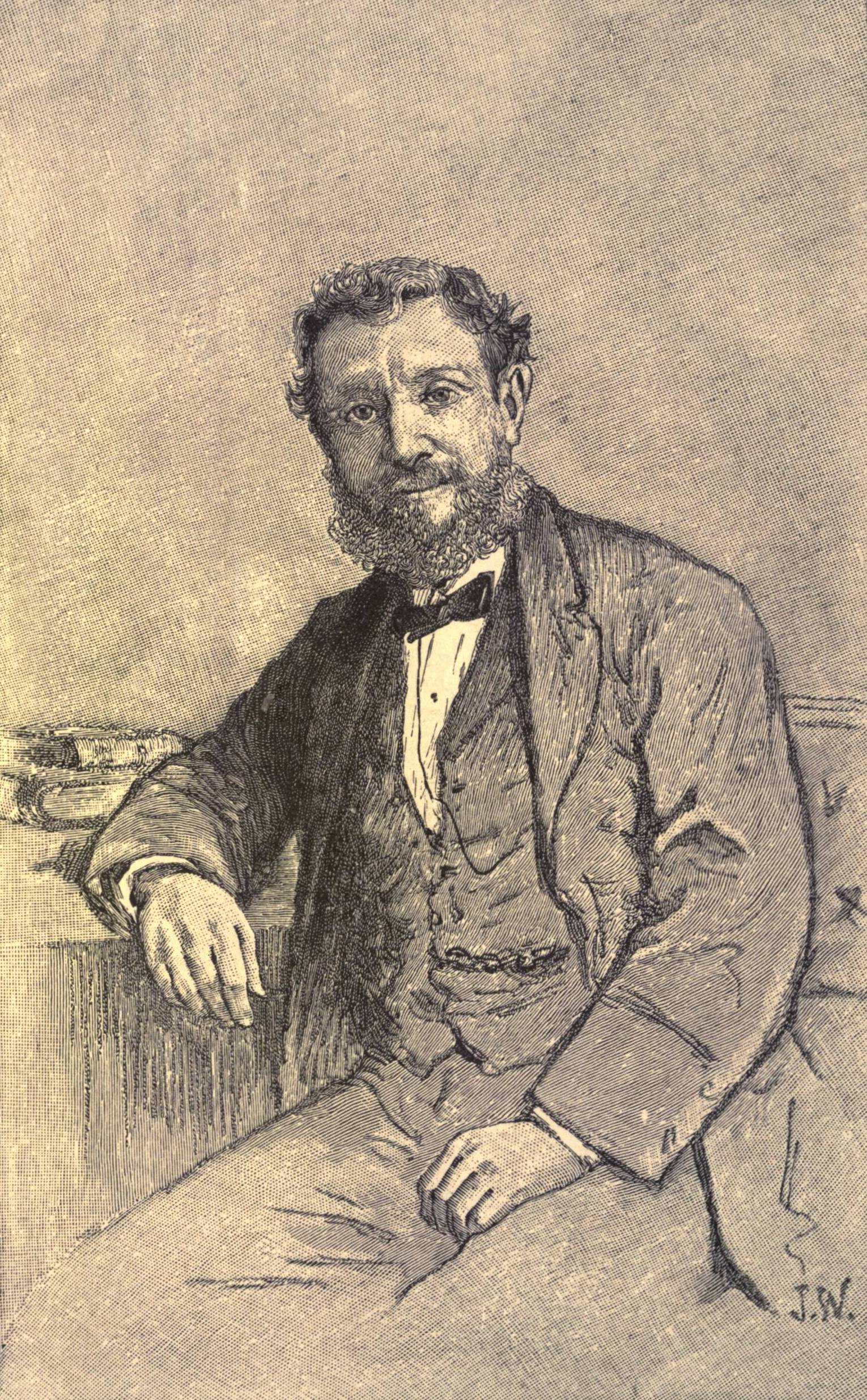
Sketch portrait of Thomson

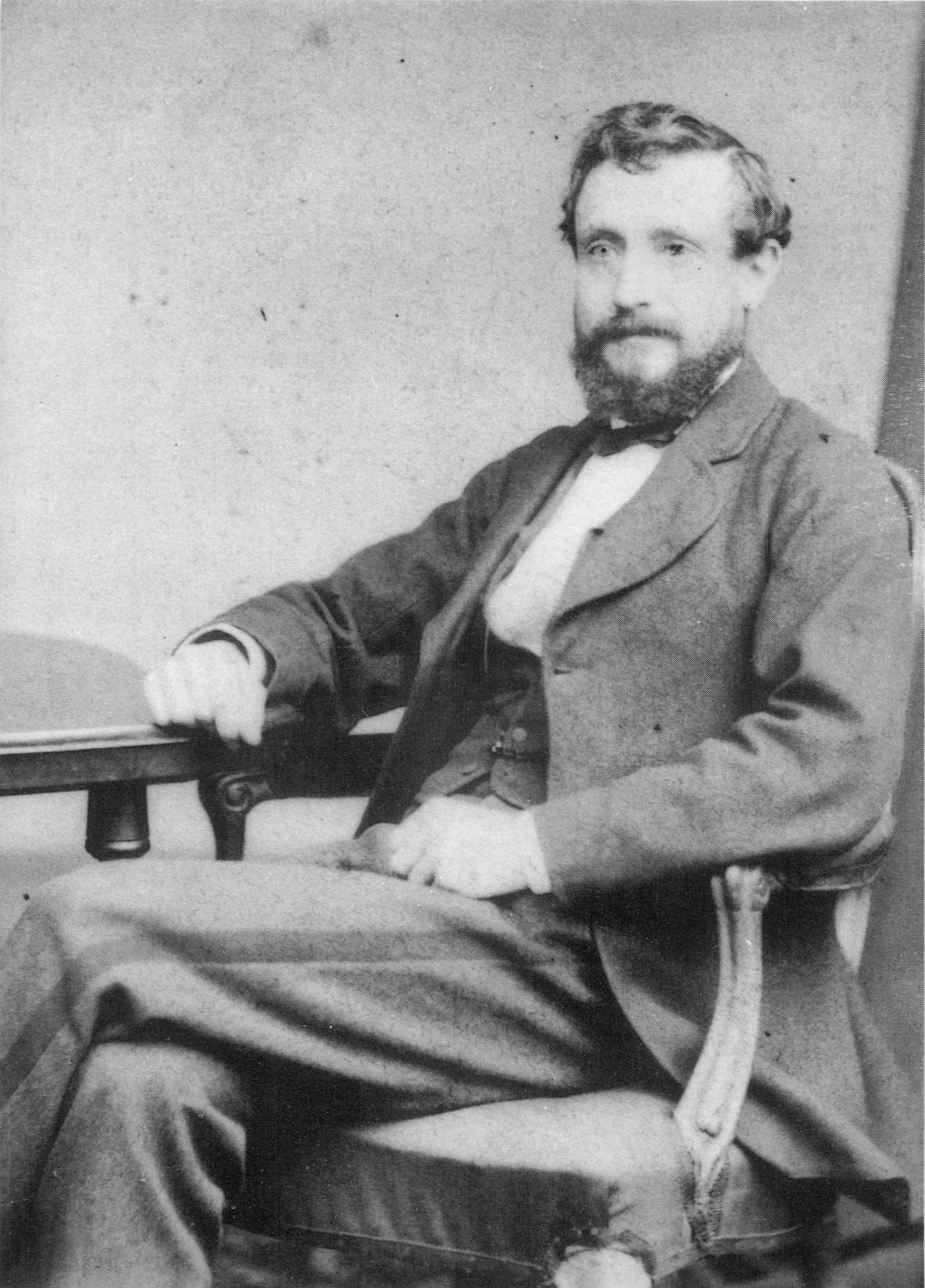
Portrait, taken in 1869

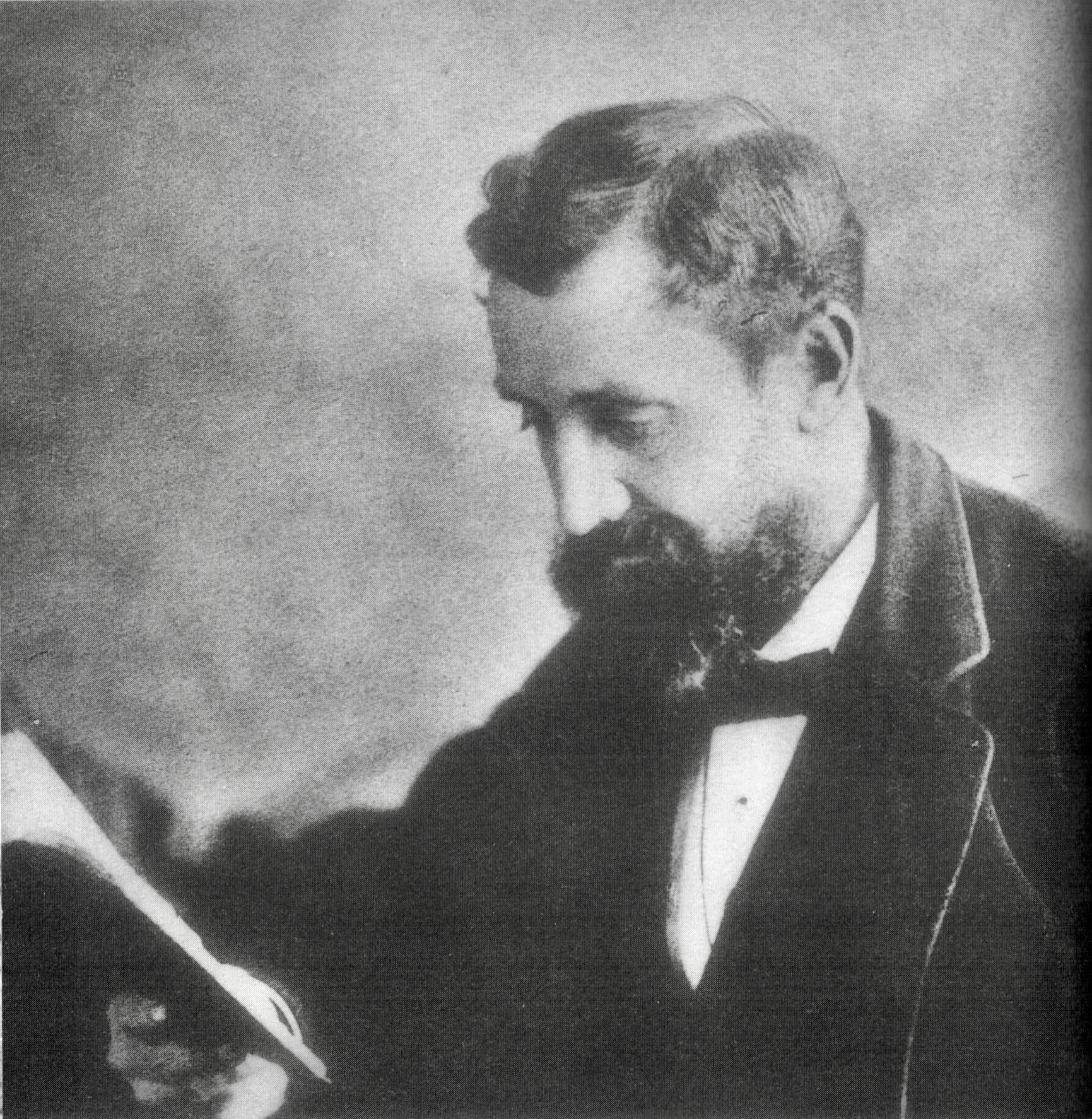
James Thomson, photo portrait, c. 1881

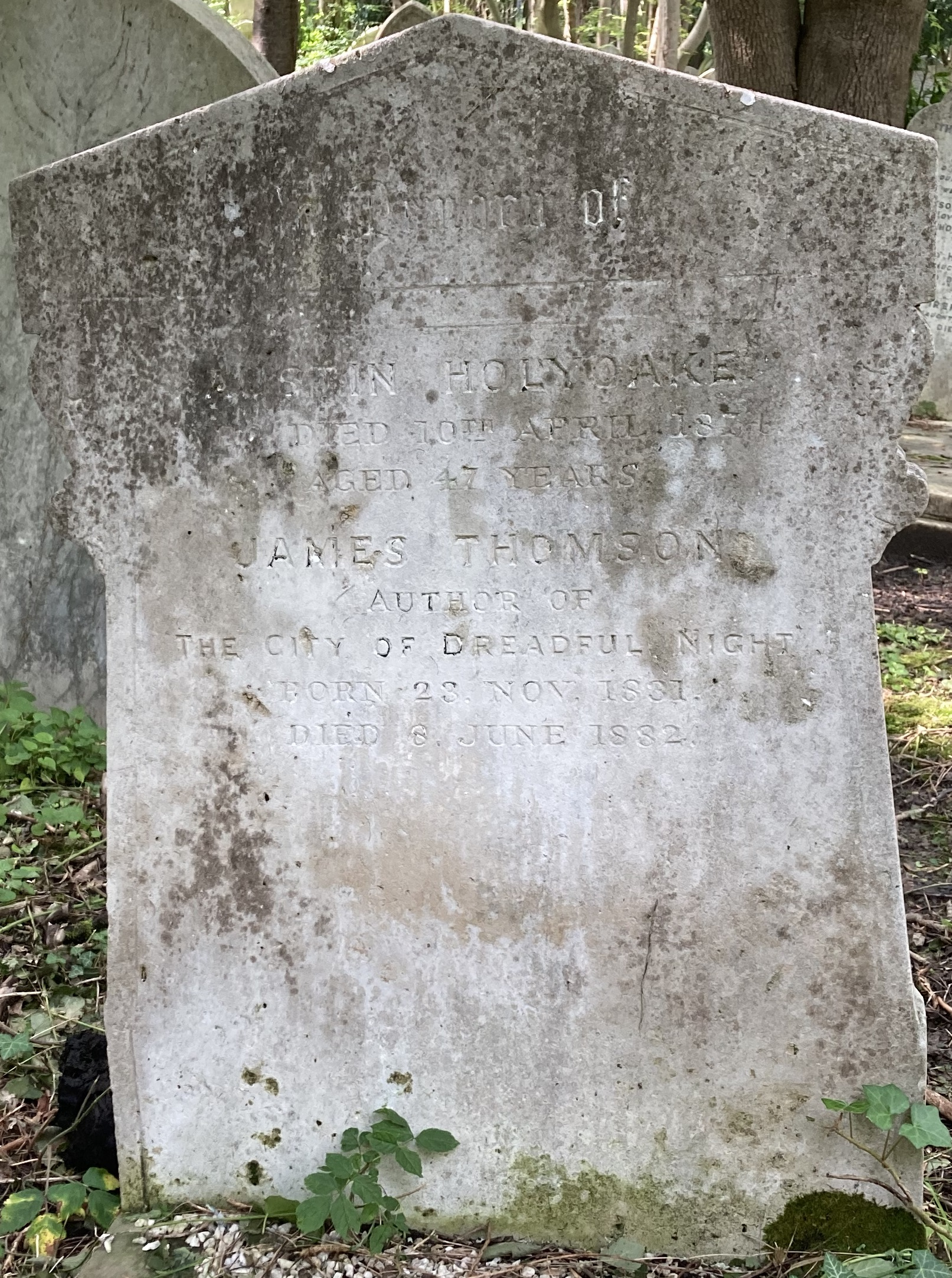
Thomson's grave in Highgate Cemetery
