= The City of Dreadful Night =

Long poem by James "B.V." Thomson

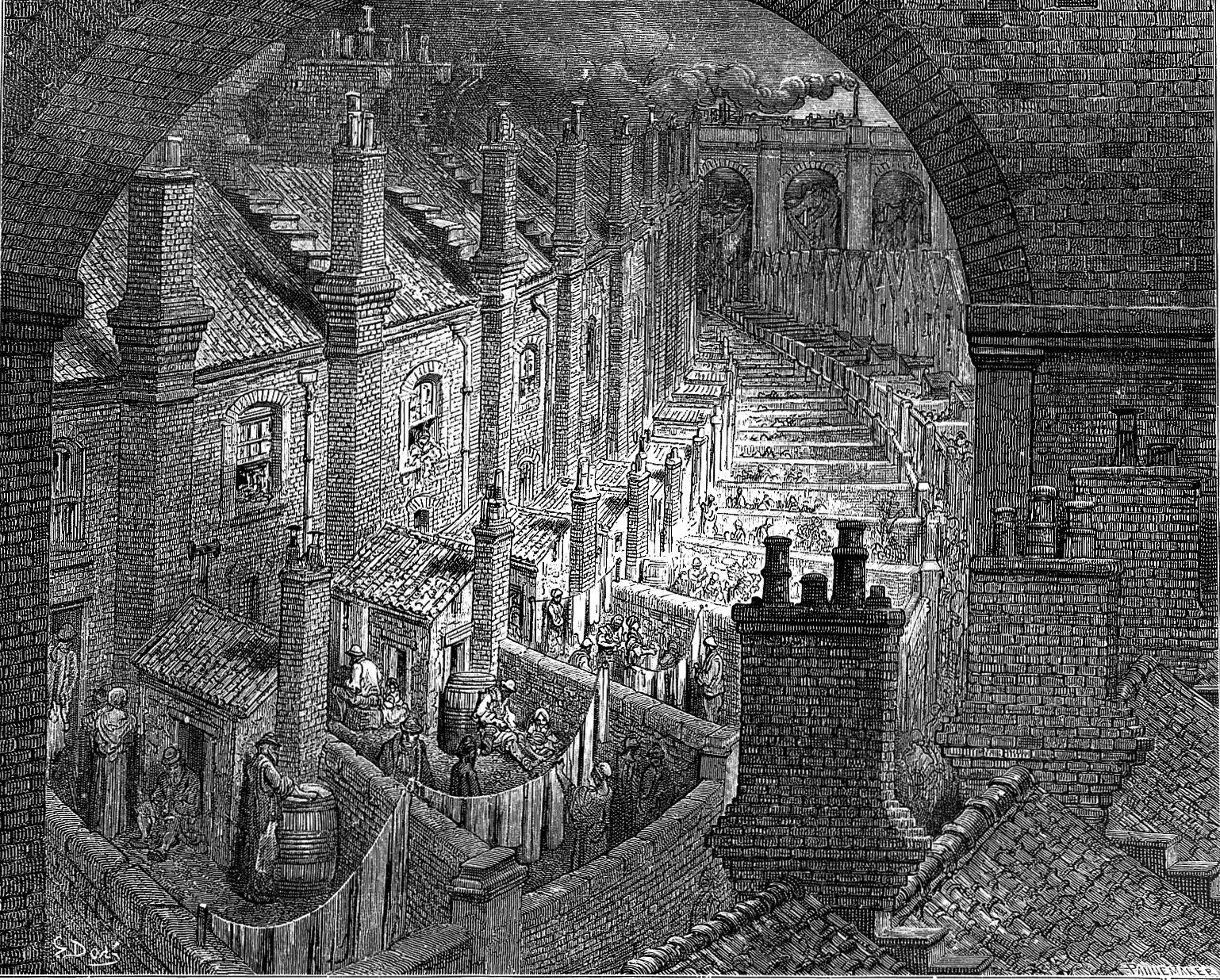
Illustration of 19th-century London slums by Gustave Doré

The City of Dreadful Night is a long poem by the Scottish poet James "B.V." Thomson, written between 1870 and 1873, and published in the National Reformer in 1874, then, in 1880, in a book entitled The City of Dreadful Night and Other Poems. The poem is noted for the pessimistic philosophy that it expresses. It has been argued that the city described in the poem is based on London.

The poem, despite its insistently bleak tone, won the praise of George Meredith, Rudyard Kipling and of George Saintsbury, who in A History of Nineteenth-Century Literature wrote that "what saves Thomson is the perfection with which he expresses the negative and hopeless side of the sense of mystery."
