= James Dafforne =

British journalist

James Dafforne (29 April 1804 – 5 June 1880) was a British journalist, known for his art criticism in The Art Journal.

== Life ==
He was for 35 years a contributor to The Art Journal, joining the staff in 1845, and writing for it till his death. He died on 5 June 1880 at the house of his son-in-law, the Rev. C. E. Casher, Upper Tooting.

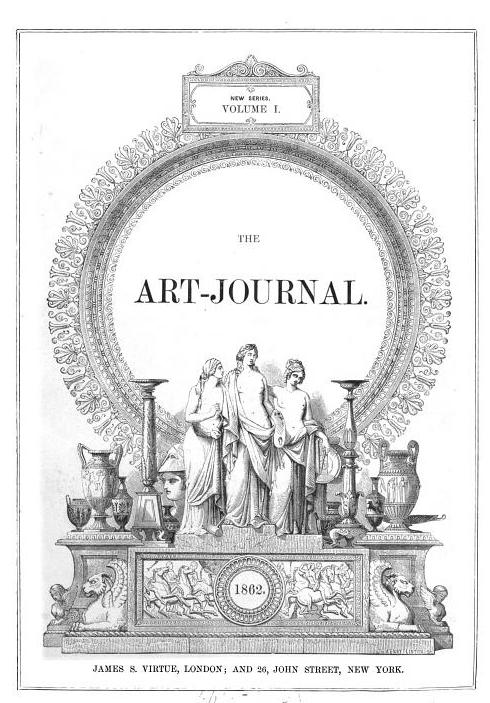
The Art Journal, title-page from 1862

== Works ==
Dafforne's works were mostly compilations from the Journal: Pictures of Daniel Maclise, R.A.; also the Pictures of William Mulready, of Leslie and Maclise, of Clarkson Stanfield, R.A., Sir Edwin Landseer, and others. He compiled the Pictorial Table-book. In 1878 he published a book on the Albert Memorial. In 1879 his final book appeared, The Life and Works of Edward Matthew Ward, R.A. He translated Arts of the Middle Ages, by De la Croix.

== British Artists: Their Style and Character ==
A long series of illustrated critical essays by Dafforne appeared in The Art Journal under this title.

Number	Date	Artist
1	January 1855	John Constable
2	February 1855	Edward Matthew Ward
3	March 1855	Francis Danby
4	April 1855	Frederick Goodall
5	May 1855	William Collins
6	July 1855	John Flaxman
7	August 1855	Frederick Richard Pickersgill
8	September 1855	William Hilton
9	October 1855	Charles Lock Eastlake
10	November 1855	Thomas Webster
11	January 1856	Augustus Wall Callcott
12	February 1856	James Clarke Hook
13	March, April 1856	Charles Robert Leslie
14	May 1856	Thomas Creswick
15	June 1856	Benjamin Robert Haydon
16	July 1856	James Baker Pyne
17	August 1856	William Powell Frith
18	September 1856	James Duffield Harding
19	October 1856	J. M. W. Turner
20	November 1856	Frank Stone
21	January 1857	William Edward Frost
22	February 1857	Alexander Johnston
23	April 1857	Alfred Elmore
24	May 1857	Clarkson Stanfield
25	June 1857	John Callcott Horsley
26	July 1857	George Cattermole
27	August 1857	John Gilbert
28	September 1857	John Gibson
29	October 1857	George Lance
30	November 1857	Samuel Prout
31	January 1858	William Linton
32	February 1858	John Frederick Lewis
33	March 1858	George Harvey
34	April 1858	Frederick William Hulme
35	May 1858	Richard Parkes Bonington
36	July 1858	David Roberts
37	August 1858	William Etty
38	September 1858	Henry Le Jeune
39	October 1858	David Wilkie
40	November 1858	Frederick Tayler
41	January 1859	Louis Haghe
42	February 1859	Paul Falconer Poole
43	March 1859	William Frederick Witherington
44	April 1859	John Linnell
45	July 1859	Richard Redgrave
46	September 1859	Henry Jutsum
47	November 1859	Thomas Lawrence
48	February 1860	David Cox
49	April 1860	William Charles Thomas Dobson
50	August 1860	Richard Ansdell
51	October 1860	William Dyce
52	December 1860	Joshua Reynolds
53	January 1861	Jacob Thompson
54	March 1861	George Edwards Hering
55	May 1861	Thomas Sidney Cooper
56	September 1861	Henry Warren
57	November 1861	Henry Fusili
58	January 1862	Alfred Edward Chalon
59	March 1862	Abraham Solomon
60	April 1862	John Cross
61	June 1862	James Ward
62	July 1862	John Absolon
63	February 1863	Joseph Clark
64	March 1863	Abraham Cooper
65	May 1863	William Henry Knight
66	June 1863	Edward Armitage
67	July 1863	Benjamin West
68	January 1864	Gilbert Stuart Newton
69	February 1864	Louis William Desanges
70	March 1864	William Mulready
71	April 1864	Penry Williams
72	May 1864	Charles Baxter
73	July 1864	Eyre Crowe
74	August 1864	William James Grant
75	September 1864	Emily Mary Osborn
76	October 1864	William John Müller
77	December 1864	Henrietta Ward
78	January 1865	Joseph Noel Paton
79	February 1865	Marcus Stone
80	March 1865	John Adam Houston
81	April 1865	Henry Tidey
82	May 1865	William Douglas
83	June 1865	William Cave Thomas
84	November 1865	John P. Burr
85	June 1869	Charles West Cope
86	July 1869	John Pettie
87	August 1869	Edward William Cooke
88	October 1869	David Octavius Hill
89	December 1869	William Gale
90	January 1870	Philip Hermogenes Calderon
91	March 1870	Erskine Nicol
92	June 1870	George Vicat Cole
93	August 1870	William Quiller Orchardson
94	October 1870	Alexander Hohenlohe Burr
95	December 1870	Henry Stacy Marks
96	January 1871 (+February)	Thomas Faed
97	February 1871	Benjamin Williams Leader
98	1871	James Archer
99	April 1871	Myles Birket Foster
100	July 1871	Robert Alexander Hillingford
101	August 1871	John Faed
102	September 1871	Robert Thorburn Ross
103	January 1872	Thomas Francis Dicksee
104	April 1872	George Elgar Hicks
105	June 1872	Philip Richard Morris
106	July 1872	Thomas Brooks
107	August 1872	James Thomas Linnell

From 1873 Dafforne continued to write British Artists essays:

Date	Artist
1873	George Henry Boughton
1874	Rudolph Lehmann
1875	Laurence Alma-Tadema
	Frederick Daniel Hardy
	George Adolphus Storey
	John George Naish
1876	Frank Holl
	John Thomas Peele
	Frederick Walker
1877	Edward John Poynter
	Richard Beavis
	Edmund John Niemann
	Laslett John Pott
1878	Briton Riviere
	Thomas Jones Barker
1879	Keeley Halswelle
	Henry Brittan Willis
	Nicholas Chevalier
	John Wright Oakes
1880	Francis William Topham
	Hubert Herkomer
	John Thomas Hamilton Macallum
	John Bagnold Burgess
