= Frederick Hulme =

Frederick Hulme may refer to:

- Frederick Edward Hulme (1841–1909), teacher and amateur botanist
- Frederick William Hulme (1816–1884), English landscape painter and illustrator

== See also ==
- Fred Hulme, rugby league footballer of the 1950s
