= Alexander Johnston (artist) =

Scottish painter (1816–1891)

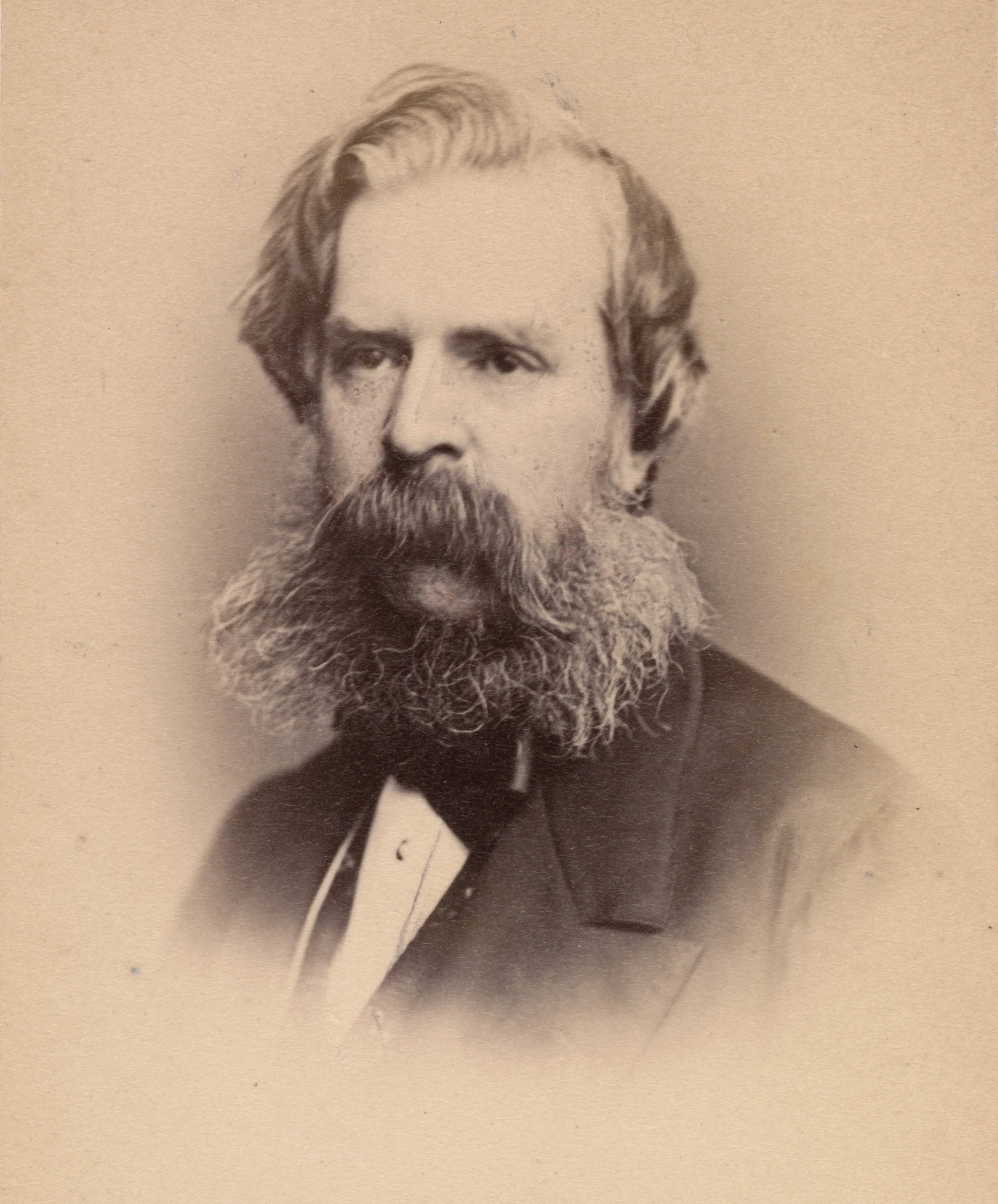
- Johnston by John Watkins, c. 1860s
- Born: 1817
- Died: 1891 (aged 74–75)

Alexander Johnston (1816 – 1891) was a Scottish painter, known for genre and history paintings.

== Life ==
Born at Edinburgh, he was son of an architect, who placed him at the age of fifteen with a seal-engraver there. He was a student in the Trustees' Academy from 1831 to 1834, when he went to London with an introduction to Sir David Wilkie. He entered the schools of the Royal Academy under William Hilton in 1836.

Johnston died at 75 Carlingford Road, Hampstead, after a short illness, on 2 February 1891. His son, Douglas Johnston, a musician in Glasgow, predeceased him.

== Works ==
While in Edinburgh Johnston took up portrait-painting, and he brought with him to London some portraits of Dr. Morison's family, which he exhibited at the Royal Academy in 1836 and 1837. In 1838 he exhibited there his first subject picture, The Mother's Prayer, and sent his Scotch Lovers to the Society of British Artists. In 1839 his picture of The Mother's Grave at the Royal Academy attracted favorable notice, while The Gentle Shepherd (1840) and Sunday Morning (1841) (formerly in the Bicknell collection and engraved by F. Bromley) established his popularity. Also in 1840, he contributed to The physiognomy of Mental Diseases by Alexander Morison, by providing portraits of the patients in mental facilities.

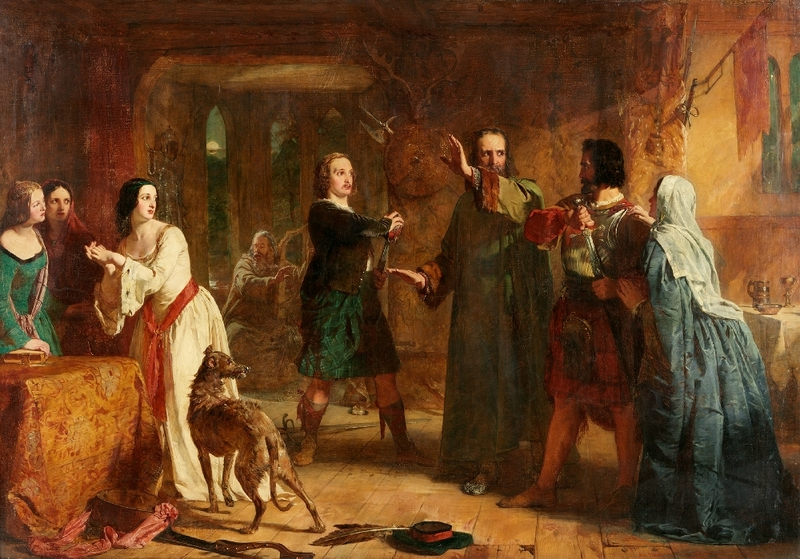
A Scene from 'The Lady of the Lake' (1849), by Alexander Johnston

In 1841 Johnston exhibited his first historical picture, The Interview of the Regent Murray with Mary Queen of Scots, which was purchased by the Edinburgh Art Union. In later years he was a contributor to all the main exhibitions. The Covenanter's Marriage (1842) was engraved by C. Lightfoot for Gems of Modern Art. A Scene from the Lady of the Lake, illustrating the poem by Walter Scott, obtained a premium from the Liverpool Academy in 1849; and Prince Charles's Introduction to Flora Macdonald after the Battle of Culloden was awarded by the Glasgow Art Union a premium (declined). In 1845 Johnston exhibited Archbishop Tillotson administering the Sacrament to Lord William Russell in the Tower, which was purchased by Robert Vernon, formed part of The Vernon Gallery, and went to the National Gallery (engraved by T. L. Atkinson and Charles Henry Jeens). Johnston was still an exhibitor in 1884.
