= Postage stamps and postal history of Canada =

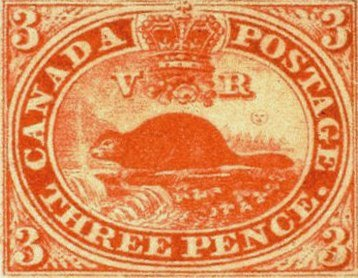
The "Threepenny beaver" stamp of 1851

The postal and philatelic history of Canada concerns postage of the territories which have formed Canada. Before Canadian Confederation, the colonies of British Columbia and Vancouver Island, Prince Edward Island, Nova Scotia, New Brunswick and Newfoundland issued stamps in their own names. The postal history falls into four major periods: French control (1604–1763), British control (1763–1841), colonial government control (1841–1867), and Canada, since 1867.

== Origins ==
At St. John's, Newfoundland on 3 August 1527 the first known letter was sent from North America. While in St. John's, John Rut had written a letter to King Henry VIII on his findings and his planned voyage. The letter in part reads as follows: "Pleasing your Honourable Grace to heare of your servant John Rut with all his company here in good health thanks be to God." The conclusion of the letter reads:

...the third day of August we entered into a good harbour called St. John and there we found Eleuen Saile of Normans and one Brittaine and two Portugal barks all a fishing and so we are ready to depart towards Cap de Bras that is 25 leagues as shortly as we have fished and so along the Coast until we may meete with our fellowe and so with all diligence that lyes in me toward parts to that Ilands that we are command at our departing and thus Jesu save and keepe you Honourable Grace and all your Honourable Reuer. In the Haven of St. John the third day of August written in hast 1527, by your servant John Rut to his uttermost of his power.

== French control ==
The earliest reference to a postal service is of couriers in 1705, namely the "first courier" Pedro da Silva, carrying the Governor's dispatches by boat, along with (for a fee) private letters. A regular postal system was proposed in 1721, but would have been too expensive at the time, and was not created until 1734, when a road existed between Montreal and Quebec. Post houses were established at intervals of nine miles (14 km) or so, along with ferries across the rivers. Fees were ten sols between the two major cities, and five sols to Trois-Rivières, Quebec.

== British control ==
The British captured Montreal in 1760, and shortly thereafter established a military postal system that handled letters between Quebec and Montreal, and from Montreal to Albany, New York.

The peace treaty of 1763 inaugurated the development of a civilian post. The Postmasters General of the American colonies, Benjamin Franklin and William Foxcroft surveyed a route between New York and Quebec, and contracted Quebec-Montreal mail to a Hugh Finlay, who provided a weekly service at 8d per letter. Mail to New York took two weeks and cost about a shilling. The service was quite successful, the Quebec-Montreal route increasing to twice a week, and eventually branching out to include Skenesborough.

The American Revolutionary War disrupted mail to New York, and also showed the weakness in not having an all-British route to Halifax, Nova Scotia. In 1787 a complicated route was set up through Riviere du Loup, Fredericton, Digby, and Annapolis. Upper Canada had its own semi-monthly route through Kingston, Niagara, Detroit, and as far as Michilimackinac on Lake Huron.

Finlay was succeeded in 1800 by George Heriot, then in 1816 Daniel Sutherland took over as Postmaster General. By this time dozens of post offices were being opened. 1816 was also when the postal services of Prince Edward Island and Nova Scotia were separated, and not rejoined until 1868.

Postmarks had been in use since 1764, Finlay having been introduced to them by Franklin. The earliest markings were town names in a straight line. As is typical of the period, the postal service introduced ever-more-complicated systems of rates for mail, depending on destination and distance. In 1840 Rowland Hill proposed a uniform rate for Great Britain that could be prepaid by postage stamps, and on May 25, 1849, the Legislative Assembly of Canada resolved to adopt the use of stamps in the Province of Canada.

== Colonial Governments ==
The colonies co-operated in the local control of the postal system after they assumed the administration from the General Post office in London in 1851, but each colony issued its own stamps until it joined the Canadian Confederation. All colonies ceased issuing postage stamps after confederation.

=== British Columbia ===
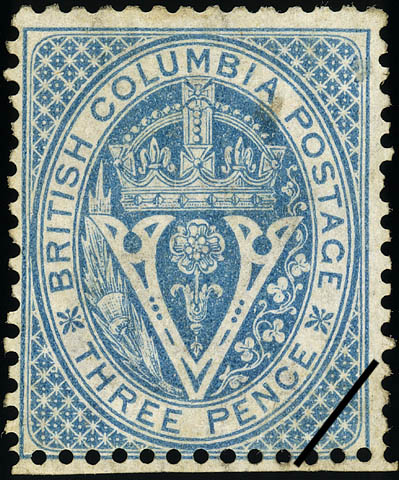
An 1865 stamp of British Columbia

The colonies of British Columbia and Vancouver Island jointly issued stamps valid in both colonies in 1860. In 1865, each colony issued its own series. After the two colonies were merged in 1866, the united colony issued stamps from 1867 to 1869.

=== Province of Canada ===
The Province of Canada began issuing stamps on April 23, 1851. The first were in the values of 3d, 6d, and 12d. Designed by Sir Sandford Fleming, the Threepenny Beaver depicted a beaver in an oval frame, and is considered the first Canadian postage stamp. It was the first stamp to picture an animal and not a monarch. It was the first official postage stamp anywhere to picture an animal, though an unofficial postmaster's provisional from St. Louis, Missouri, showed two bears in 1845. The 6d was a portrait of Prince Albert from a drawing by William Drummond Esq. The 12d (1 shilling) was reproduced from a full-length painting of Queen Victoria done by Alfred Edward Chalon. All three stamps were produced by the firm of Rawdon, Wright, Hatch and Edson of New York.

In April 1851, the rate for inland letters to Canada, Nova Scotia, New Brunswick, Cape Breton and Prince Edward Island was 3d per 1/2 oz. Letters to the USA was 6d per 1/2 oz, excluding California and Oregon, which was 9d per 1/2 oz. The first issues were made on laid paper, which did not stick as well to envelopes; thus in 1852 the printers switched to wove paper. All of these early stamps were imperforate issues. These earliest issues on laid paper are quite rare; a grand total of only 1,450 copies of the 12d were ever issued. Copies today, depending on their condition, may sell for US$50,000 or more.

Between 1852 and 1857, the postal service came out with new values: 1/2d, 7 1/2d, and 10d, while removing the 12d. The first two depicting Victoria, and the 10d featuring a portrait of Jacques Cartier. The 7 1/2d was unusual in that it was also denominated "6 Pence Sterling". In 1858 the first perforated stamps were issued in 1/2d, 3d, and 6d values, depicting Queen Victoria, a beaver and HRH Prince Albert.

In 1859 the province standardized on a single decimal monetary system, which also meant new stamps would be needed. Between 1859 and 1864, the American Bank Note Company, New York produced seven new stamps in: 1¢, 2¢, 5¢, (two) 10¢, 12 1/2¢, and 17¢ values. In general, existing designs were used. These were the last stamps produced for the Province of Canada.

=== New Brunswick ===
New Brunswick first issued stamps in 1851; they were imperforate and denominated in pence. They consisted of a 3d red, 6d olive yellow, 1/- bright red violet and a 1/- dull violet issues, all on bluish paper. All four stamps were diamond-shaped and bore the New Brunswick coat of arms. In 1860, six new stamps, denominated in cents, were issued. The 1¢ depicted a steam locomotive, the 2¢, 5¢, and 10¢ values showed a young Queen Victoria, while the 12 1/2¢ depicted a steamship and the 17¢ showed the Prince of Wales in Highland regalia.

=== Newfoundland ===
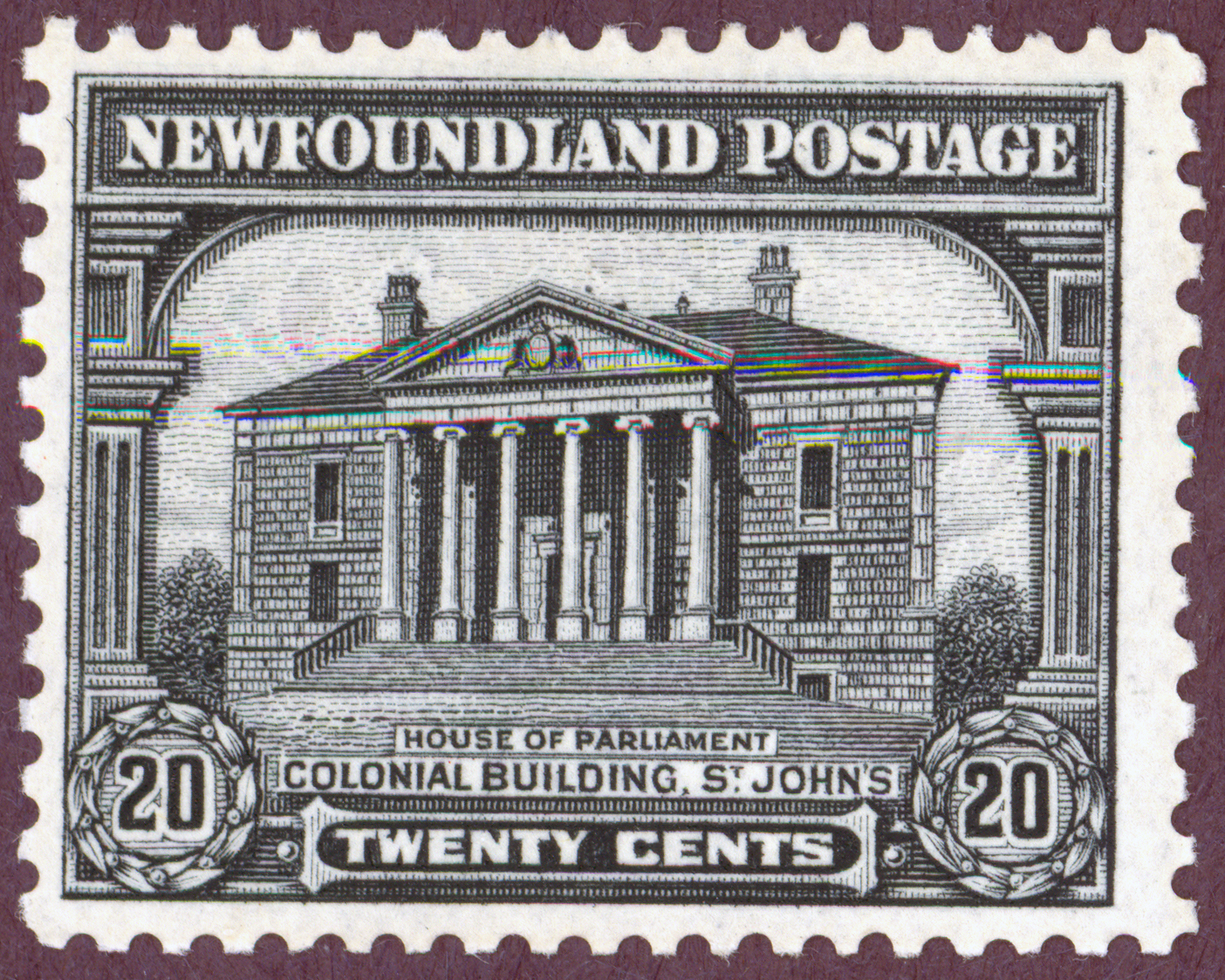
A 20¢ Newfoundland stamp of 1928

The colony and later the dominion of Newfoundland had a 90-year history of issuing postage stamps. The first issues were in 1857. The last issue was in 1947, two years before Newfoundland joined the Canadian Confederation. Newfoundland stamps remain valid for mail posted anywhere in Canada.

=== Nova Scotia ===
Nova Scotia's first issue was from 1851 to 1857, in pence. The second issue, in cents, was from 1861 to 1863.

=== Prince Edward Island ===
Prince Edward Island issued stamps in pence from 1862 to 1865, and a second series from 1868 to 1870. The third series, in cents, was issued in 1872.

== Canada ==
=== Victorian period ===
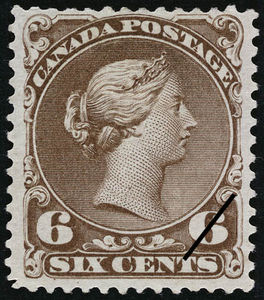
An 1868 6¢ "Large Queen" stamp

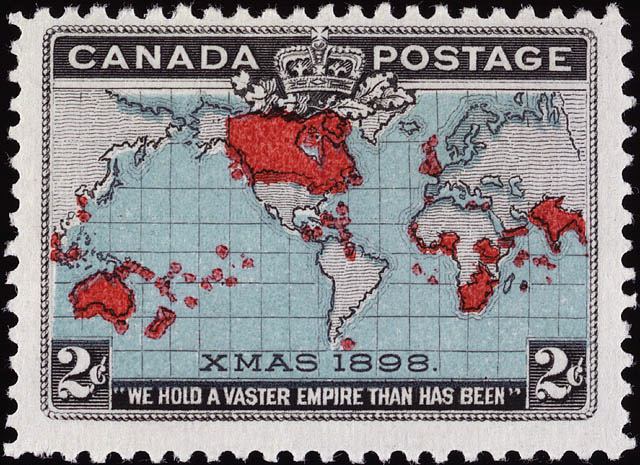
The Canadian "Xmas" map stamp of 1898

The Dominion came into existence July 1, 1867, assembled from colonies each of which had their own stamps, so the new government issued a new series of stamps on April 1, 1868, superseding all previous issues. These featured a profile of Queen Victoria, based on an engraving by Charles Henry Jeens and became known to philatelists as the "Large Queens". They ranged in value from 1/2¢ to 15¢. While mostly printed on wove paper, a few of the 1¢, 2¢, and 3¢ values were also printed on laid paper; only three examples of the Canada 2c Large Queen on laid paper are known, making it Canada's rarest stamp.

Except for the 15c value which was in use as late as 1897, the Large Queens had a relatively short life, being replaced in 1870 by the "Small Queens", smaller stamps of the same basic design, adopted to be able to produce more stamps more quickly. The Small Queens came in a number of printings between 1870 and 1897. In 1893 20¢ and 50¢ stamps came out with a 3/4 portrait of Victoria.

When Prince Edward Island became a Canadian province in 1873, it sold off all its remaining pre-Canadian stamps at discounted prices, flooding the market with over 1.5 million cheap stamps. Since these stamps had next to no value, forgers had no compelling reason to make copies. Today, since forged versions of Prince Edward Island stamps are harder to find than the original, the forgeries are more valuable. Library and Archives Canada holds a forged, lithographed version of a stamp from 1870 that features an engraving of Queen Victoria.

In 1897, the American Bank Note Company secured the contract to print stamps for Canada, which lasted until 1923. The company's first job was to print a series for the Diamond Jubilee celebrating the 60th year of Queen Victoria and the 30th year of confederation, the first commemorative stamps of Canada. The design was a side-by-side of the Chalon vignette of the young Victoria and the likeness photographed by Alexander Bassano in 1887. The series included 16 denominations ranging from 1/2¢ to five dollars, a princely sum in those days, and more aimed at collectors than mailers. Only 9,937 of the $4 value were ever sold, and they are rare and expensive today.

1897 also saw the "Maple Leaf Issue", regular stamps with the central design based on a Jubilee portrait for Victoria, with maple leaves in each corner. It was in use for only a few months before being replaced by a modified design that replaced the lower leaves with numerals of value, motivated by the French-speaking population who found it difficult to read the textual denomination on the original design. (The Universal Postal Union would require the use of Arabic numerals in 1907.)

In 1898, a first step towards Imperial Penny Postage happened when a number of Dominions agreed on a uniform rate of 1d (2¢ in Canada). Canada issued an interesting stamp depicting a map of the entire world, with British possessions marked in red, inscribed "XMAS 1898" (the rate took effect on Christmas Day), and "WE HOLD A VASTER EMPIRE THAN HAS BEEN" underneath, a line extracted from "A Song of Empire" composed by Sir Lewis Morris in 1887. The stamp was notable as the first multi-colour stamp of Canada, and also for the tremendous variability of the red highlighting, resulting in amusing geographical incongruities.

=== Edward VII ===
Upon the accession of King Edward VII, the basic maple leaf was retained but updated with a portrait of Edward wearing the ermine Robes of State. Seven stamps bearing Edward VII based upon his coronation painting were issued between 1903 and 1908. In addition, a commemorative stamp of the Quebec Tercentenary was issued in 1908 featuring Edward VII and Queen Alexandra. Canada's first experiments with coil stamps occurred during this period.

=== George V ===
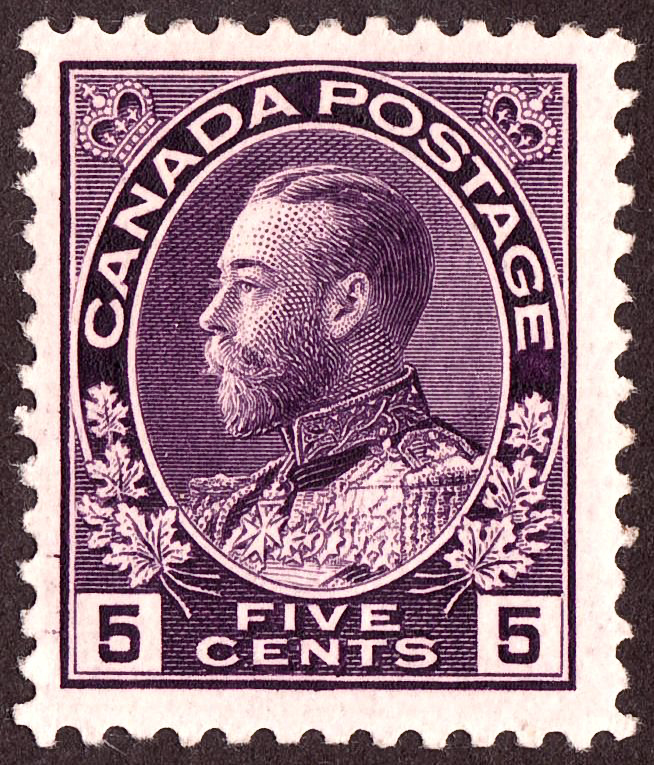
A George V 5¢ stamp of 1922

King George V was depicted in 1911 as Admiral of the Fleet in a widely admired design that continued in use until 1928.

1928 saw the "Scroll Issue", so-called because "CANADA" appeared in a scroll across the top. This was the first issue to be bilingual. The pictorials are among the finest stamps ever produced, especially the 50¢ value Bluenose stamp portraying the legendary schooner Bluenose.

The "Arch Issue" of 1930 was similarly elegant. The last issue for George V, in 1935, was called the "Dated Die Issue" because the year appeared in very small print in the design.

=== Edward VIII ===
No stamps were issued during the reign of Edward VIII since he abdicated the throne before the Coronation Ceremony took place.

=== George VI ===
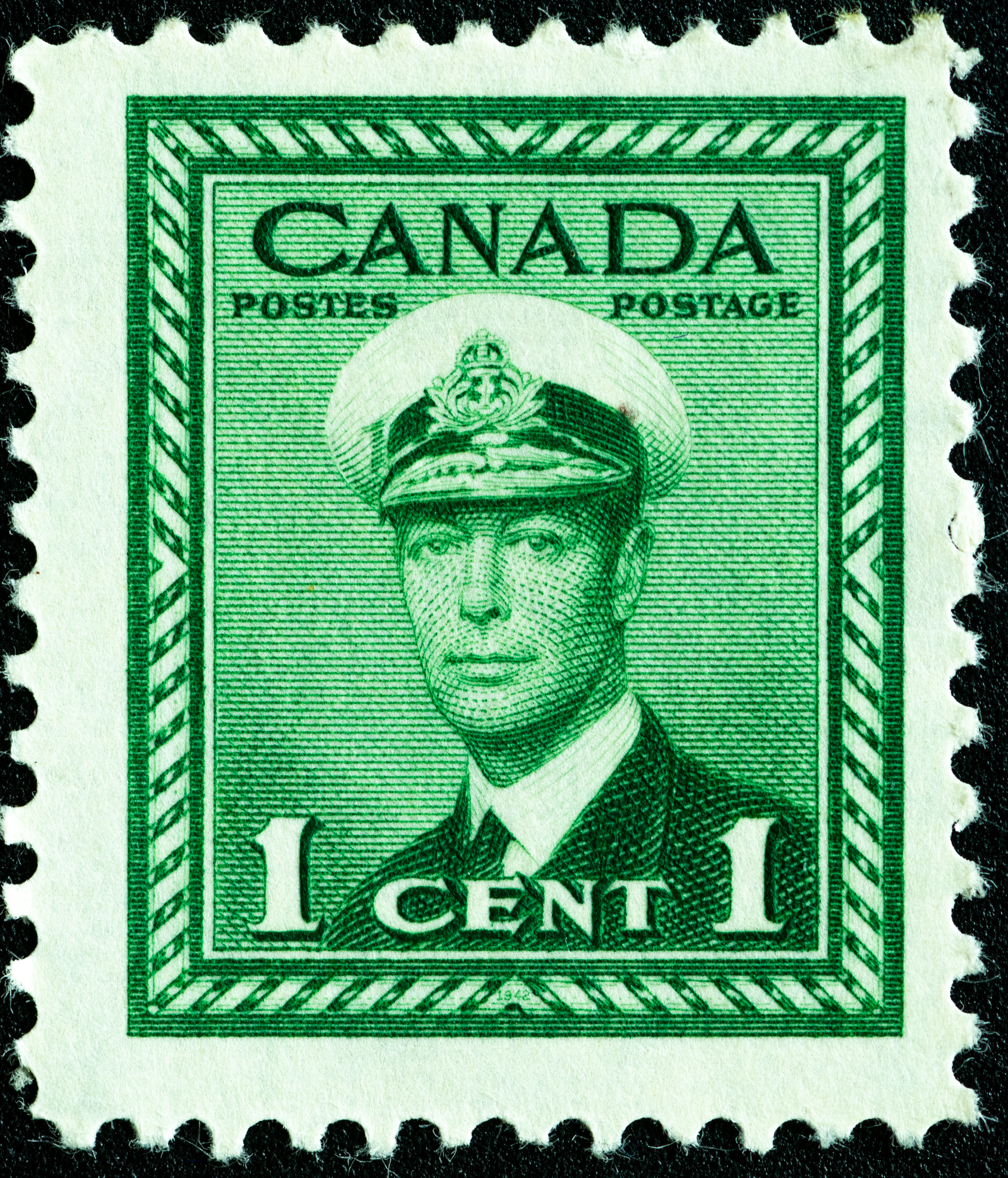
A George VI 1¢ stamp of 1942

The dated die concept was used in 1937 as well, in the stamps issued for newly crowned King George VI. A group of three stamps in May 1939 marked the royal visit and a commemorative cover was available postmarked from the Royal Train.

Soon after the Empire was plunged into war; the War issue of 1942 highlighted Canada's contributions. While the low values showed the King wearing the uniforms of the different services, the higher values showed Canada's role in growing food and the production of munitions, including a Ram tank, a corvette, and a destroyer.

In 1946, the "Peace issue" showed scenes and economic activities around the country. From the late 1940s on, the issuance of commemoratives became a regular event, with two in 1947, but gradually increasing. The last regular stamps of George VI came out in 1951.

=== Elizabeth II ===
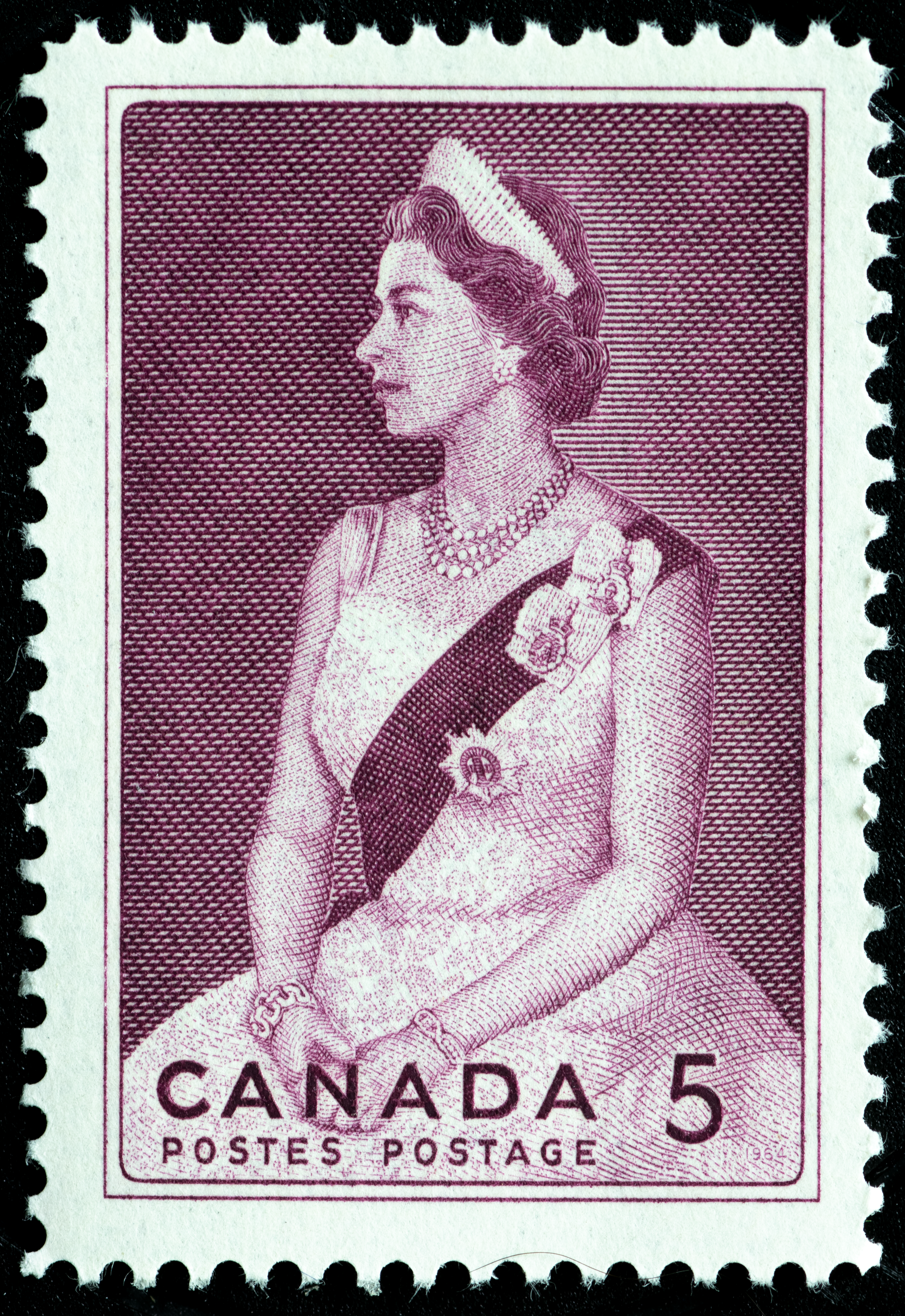
A 1964 stamp featuring Elizabeth II

The first definitive issue for Elizabeth II's reign was based on a portrait by Yusuf Karsh, and was issued on a plain background in five values on May 1, 1953.

The Karsh series was replaced in the following year by a new design based on the portrait by Dorothy Wilding that was also used in the United Kingdom. The 5¢ value was issued on April 1 with the introduction of the new domestic first class letter rate. Five more values in this series were introduced on June 10. With this series the post office began experimenting with fluorescence on stamps, resulting in a number of challenging varieties over the life of this and the next two series.

The Wilding series was replaced by the "Cameo" series, a horizontal design by Ernst Roch. The series began with the 5¢ value on 10 March 1962. The 1¢ and 4¢ values were released on 2 April 1963, and the 2¢ and 3¢ values followed on May 2.

From the 1960s on, Canadian stamp policies have favoured issuing a relatively large number of single commemoratives valued at the prevailing first-class rate. In its commemorative issues Canada has made extensive use of works by well-known artists and until very recently has not used images of living people on its stamps.

Definitive series have tended to be combinations of design types, each applying to a range of values. For instance, the definitives of the late 1980s featured native wildlife for values up to 80 cents, and Canadian architecture for the dollar values, while those of the early 1990s used berries for the lowest values, and fruit trees for the higher values, and continuing with architecture for the highest values.

In December 2003, Canada Post issued a new 49¢ definitive stamp bearing the image of Queen Elizabeth II using a photograph taken by rock star Bryan Adams. A similar redenominated stamp was issued in 2005 as a 50¢ denomination, and a 51¢ denomination in 2006 (see Queen Elizabeth II definitive stamp (Canada)).

=== Charles III ===
The first definitive issue for Charles III's reign was unveiled by Canada Post on May 5, 2023, and became available for purchase on May 8, 2023. The definitive stamp features a portrait of His Majesty King Charles III, then The Prince of Wales, by photographer Alan Shawcross.

== See also ==
- Canadian definitive postage stamps
- History of Canada
- List of people on stamps of Canada
- People on stamps of Canadian provinces
- Revenue stamps of Canada

== References and sources ==
Sources

- Stanley Gibbons: various catalogues.
- Encyclopaedia of Postal Authorities
- Rossiter, Stuart & John Flower. The Stamp Atlas. London: Macdonald, 1986. ISBN 0-356-10862-7
- Winthrop Smillie Boggs. (1945, reprinted 1974) The Postage Stamps and Postal History of Canada. Lawrence, Mass: Quarterman Publications.
- Detecting the Truth: Fakes, Forgeries and Trickery, a virtual museum exhibition at Library and Archives Canada
- Harris, Dwight Robin. (1998) 1952–53 Karsh, 1954–62 Wilding, 1962–66 Cameo definitives.
