= Henry Chawner Shenton =

British engraver

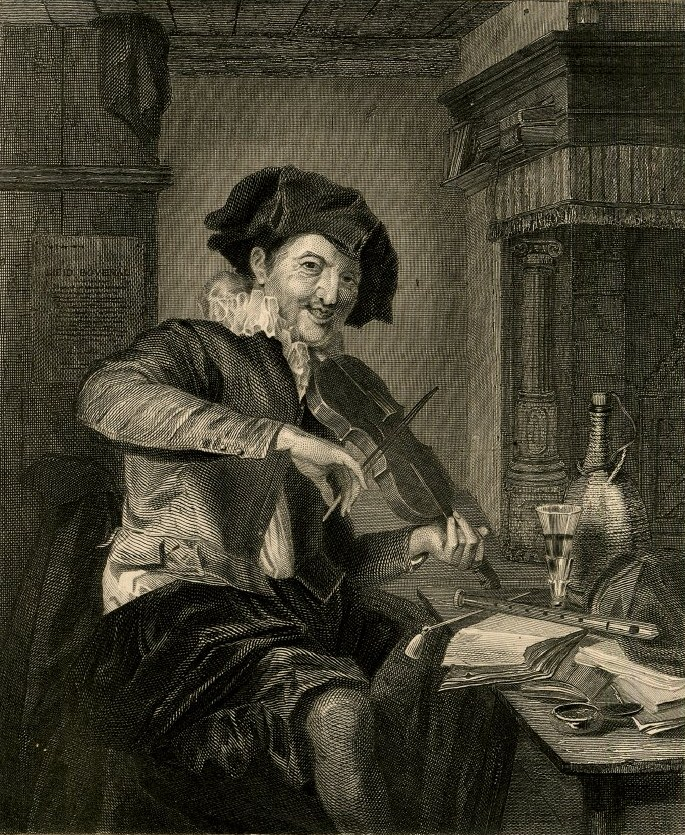
The Merry Fiddler (1833), engraving by Henry Chawner Shenton after Gerrit Adriaensz. Berckheyde, for the Cabinet Gallery of Allan Cunningham

Henry Chawner Shenton (1803–1866) was an English engraver.

== Life ==
He was born at Winchester, and became a pupil of Charles Warren, one of whose daughters he married. He died suddenly at Camden Town on 15 September 1866.

== Works ==
Shenton was a line engraver in the British style typical of the early 19th century. His early commissions were book illustrations, from designs by Thomas Stothard, Thomas Uwins, Richard Westall, Edward Henry Corbould, and others; some these he exhibited with the Society of British Artists between 1825 and 1832. Subsequently, he executed plates on a larger scale, including The Stray Kitten, after William Collins, and The Hermit, after Alexander George Fraser. For William Finden's Gallery of British Art he engraved A Day's Sport in the Highlands, after Abraham Cooper, and The Loan of a Bite, after William Mulready. Shenton's best-known plates were published by the Art Union of London:

- The Tired Huntsman, after Charles Landseer, 1840
- The Clemency of Cœur de Lion, after John Cross, 1857
- A Labour of Love, after John Robert Dicksee, 1863 (not finished on account of his failing eyesight)

Shenton also executed for the Art Union a set of outlines of incidents in English history, from designs by various artists, issued in 1847.

== Family ==
Henry Chawner Shenton (1825–1846), his eldest son, studied in the schools of the Royal Academy and at Rome, and was trained as a sculptor by William Behnes. He exhibited pieces in 1843–5. ion; but the artist's career was cut short, after a brief illness, on 7 February 1846. His brother, William Kernot Shenton (1836–1877), born in June 1836, also became a sculptor and exhibited medallion portraits at the Royal Academy from 1857 to 1871. He for a time taught drawing and modelling in the art school at the Crystal Palace, and died on 19 April 1877.

== Notes ==
Attribution

This article incorporates text from a publication now in the public domain: Lee, Sidney, ed. (1897). "Shenton, Henry Chawner". Dictionary of National Biography. Vol. 52. London: Smith, Elder & Co.
