= Greencastle Lifeboat Station =

Former RNLI lifeboat station in County Donegal, Ireland

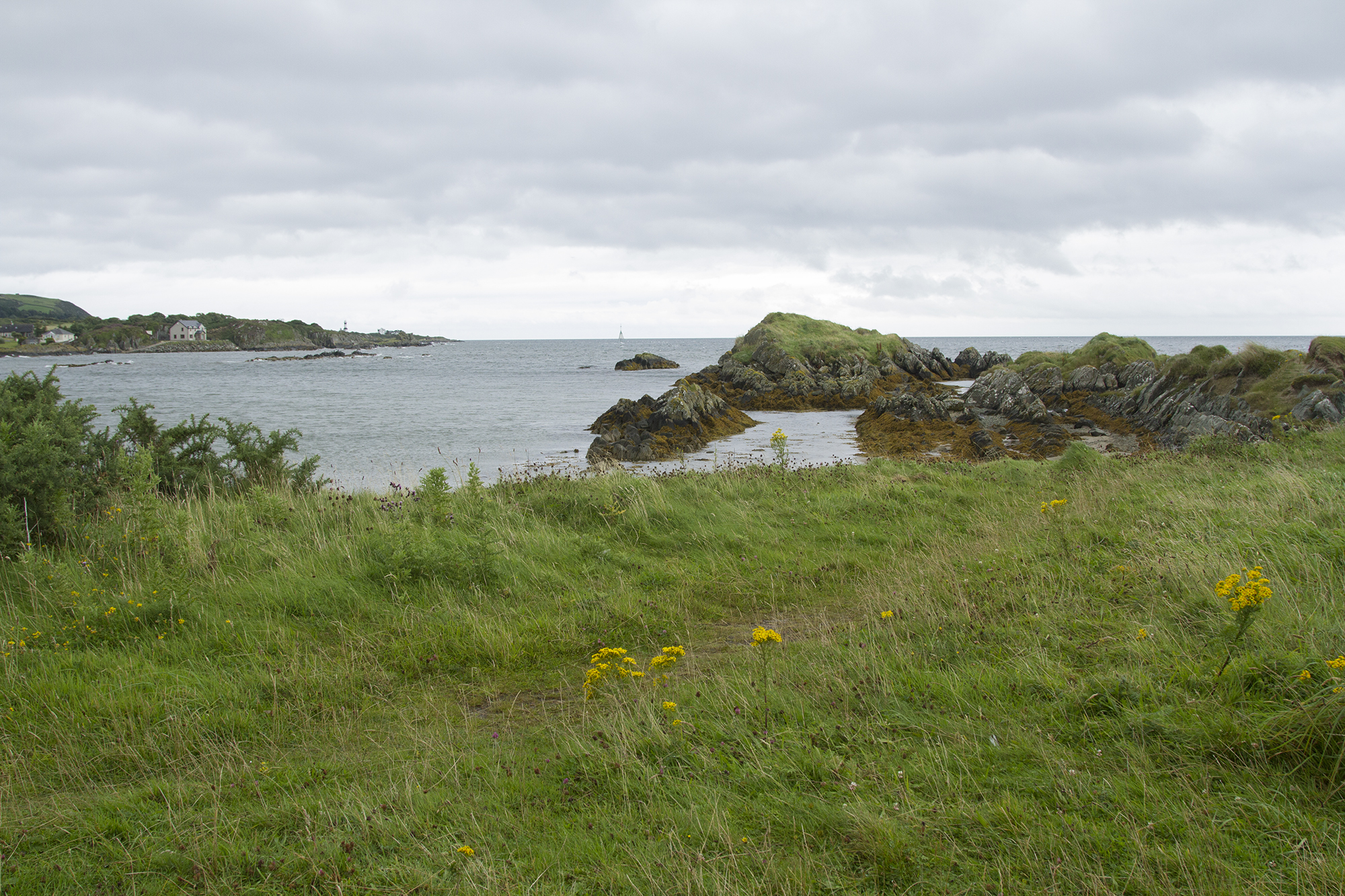
- View of Port Blaney in the distance

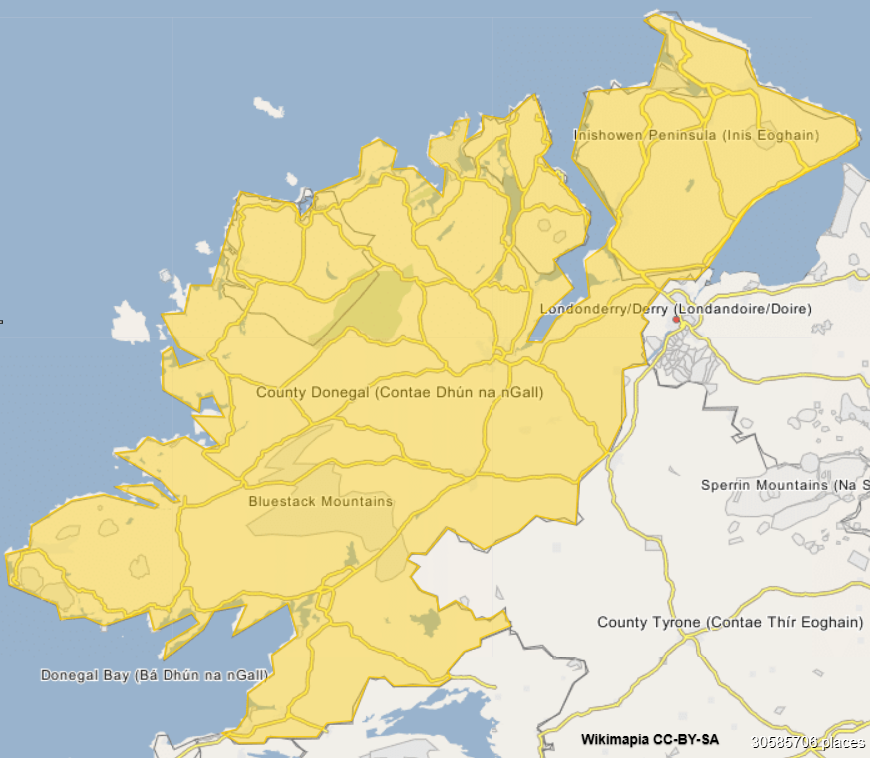
- Port Blaney, County Donegal

General information
- Status: Closed
- Type: RNLI Lifeboat Station
- Location: Port Blaney, Greencastle, County Donegal, Ireland
- Coordinates: 55°12′58.9″N 6°56′45.3″W
- Opened: April 1864
- Closed: 1928

Greencastle Lifeboat Station was located at Port Blaney, a hamlet overlooking the entrance to Lough Foyle, approximately 3 km (1.9 mi) north-east of Greencastle, at the eastern point of the Inishowen Peninsula, in County Donegal, Ireland.

The lifeboat station was first established at Greencastle in 1864 by the Royal National Lifeboat Institution (RNLI).

After 64 years of operation, Greencastle Lifeboat Station was closed in 1928.

== History ==
On 12 March 1853, the schooner Harmony sank in a gale off Greencastle harbour. Led by a H.M Coastguard boatman, 10 men in a yawl rescued three men and a woman. Ever since its founding in 1824, the Royal National Institution for the Preservation of Life from Shipwreck (RNIPLS), later to become the RNLI in 1854, would award medals for deeds of gallantry at sea, even if no lifeboats were involved. William Brice, Commissioned Boatman, H.M. Coastguard at Greencastle Fort, was awarded the RNIPLS Silver Medal.

In the RNLI journal 'The Lifeboat' of 1 July 1864, it was reported that a lifeboat station had been established at the entrance to Lough Foyle, for the port of Londonderry. "Wrecks have not been numerous in the locality; but as the dangerous " Tuns Bank" lies in the track of vessels at the entrance of the lough, it was considered that provision should be made to meet the possible contingency of accident to any of the numerous passenger-ships which are constantly entering and leaving the port."

A 28-foot self-righting 'Pulling and Sailing' (P&S) lifeboat, one with sails and (6) oars, built by Forrestt of Limehouse, was transported from London to Belfast free of charge, aboard one the steamships of the Belfast Screw Steam Ship Company, and then onward to Londonderry, via the Irish North Western Railway, arriving in April 1864. A boathouse was constructed, at a cost of £159. The cost of the lifeboat and equipment was covered by the gift of £250 from Mr J. D. Allcroft of Wood Street, London.

In 1871, on the recommendation of the local committee, the 28-foot lifeboat was replaced with a larger 33-foot 10-oared life-boat, " as so many large emigrant ships are constantly leaving the Port of Londonderry, and should accidents happen to them at the entrance of Lough Foyle, where the boat is placed, a larger boat was considered necessary." The lifeboat was transported free of charge from Liverpool by the steamship of Johnson Grainger & Co, who generously returned the old boat under the same terms.

On the morning of 11 November 1873, in a northerly gale, the barque L. G. Biglow of Nova Scotia was seen indicating signals of distress near the Tuns Bank. Launch of the lifeboat was delayed by the "misconduct" of the Coxswain, and reluctance by some of the crew to set out in the conditions. A Coastguard took the place of the Coxswain, and with a new crew, the lifeboat set out, in the tow of the Steam-tug Admiral, but had to return when the Admiral was damaged. Assistance was rendered to the vessel by the lifeboat the following day, when the weather had calmed. Second Coxswain John McGuiness was awarded £25 in consideration for injuries received rescuing two people.

A name on the lifeboat would be maintained for as long as the donated funds lasted. However, once this was depleted, funding from an alternative source would be appropriated to the station, and in 1880, the £800 legacy of the late Mrs Mary Beckwith of Tynemouth was appropriated to Greencastle, with the lifeboat name changed to Mary Beckwith (ON 285).

The third and final lifeboat to be placed at Greencastle, was a 35-foot self-righting lifeboat named Brittan Willis (ON 492). The lifeboat had been funded from the legacy of the late Mrs Elizabeth Ann Willis, née Broughton, of Weston-super-Mare, an amount of £644-13s-9d, with the request that a lifeboat be named after her late husband and artist Henry Brittan Willis.

In dense fog, but calm conditions, the Anchor Line Ocean Liner California ran aground on Tory Island on the evening of 28 June 1914, with 1100 passengers and 270 crew aboard. Multiple vessels were called to the scene, including the Arranmore lifeboat La Totitam (ON 490). The Brittan Willis launched at 23:00, and was towed the 80 kilometres (50 mi) to the scene by the tugboat Earl of Dunraven. With all passengers taken off by the time she arrived, the lifeboat stood by for 12 hours, while the crew attempted to refloat the vessel. Due to the large number of crew still aboard, she would return to the California on 1 July, standing by until the 5th July.

In 1928, it was decided to close Greencastle Lifeboat Station. It is likely that this was due to the placement of a motor-powered lifeboat at Portrush in 1924, approximately 19 kilometres (12 mi) to the east. The lifeboat station still stands, and is now a private residence. The lifeboat on station at the time of closure, Brittan Willis (ON 492), was transferred to Kilmore Quay.

== Station honours ==
The following are awards made at Greencastle.

- RNIPLS Silver Medal

William Brice, Commissioned Boatman, H.M. Coastguard, Greencastle Fort – 1853

- The Thanks of the Institution inscribed on Vellum

Mr Walter McClellan Crosbie – 1895

- Binocular Glass

Fraulein von Amelunex – 1895

== Greencastle lifeboats ==
=== Pulling and Sailing (P&S) lifeboats ===
ON (Note: ON is the RNLI's Official Number of the boat.)	Name	Built	On station	Class	Comments
Pre-426	Mary Annette	1864	1864–1871	28-foot Peake Self-righting (P&S)	(Note: 28-foot x 6-foot 1in (6-oared) Peake-class self-righting (P&S) lifeboat, gift of Mr J. D. Allcroft of London, built by Forrestt of Limehouse, London.)
285	Mary Annette	1871	1871–1880	33-foot Peake Self-righting (P&S)	(Note: 33-foot x 8-foot (10-oared) Peake-class self-righting (P&S) lifeboat, gift of Mr J. D. Allcroft of London, built by Woolfe of Shadwell, London, costing £287s.); Renamed Mary Beckwith in 1880.
285	Mary Beckwith	1871	1880–1902	33-foot Peake Self-righting (P&S)	(Note: Legacy of Mrs Beckwith of Tynemouth.)
492	Brittan Willis	1902	1902–1928	35-foot Self-righting (P&S)	(Note: 35-foot x 8-foot 6in (10-oared) self-righting (P&S) lifeboat, legacy of Mrs E. A. Willis of Weston-super-Mare, built by Thames Ironworks of Blackwall, London, costing £810.)

Station closed, 1928

Pre ON numbers are unofficial numbers used by the Lifeboat Enthusiast Society to reference early lifeboats not included on the official RNLI list.

== See also ==
- List of RNLI stations
- List of former RNLI stations
- Royal National Lifeboat Institution lifeboats
