= Revenue stamps of Canada =

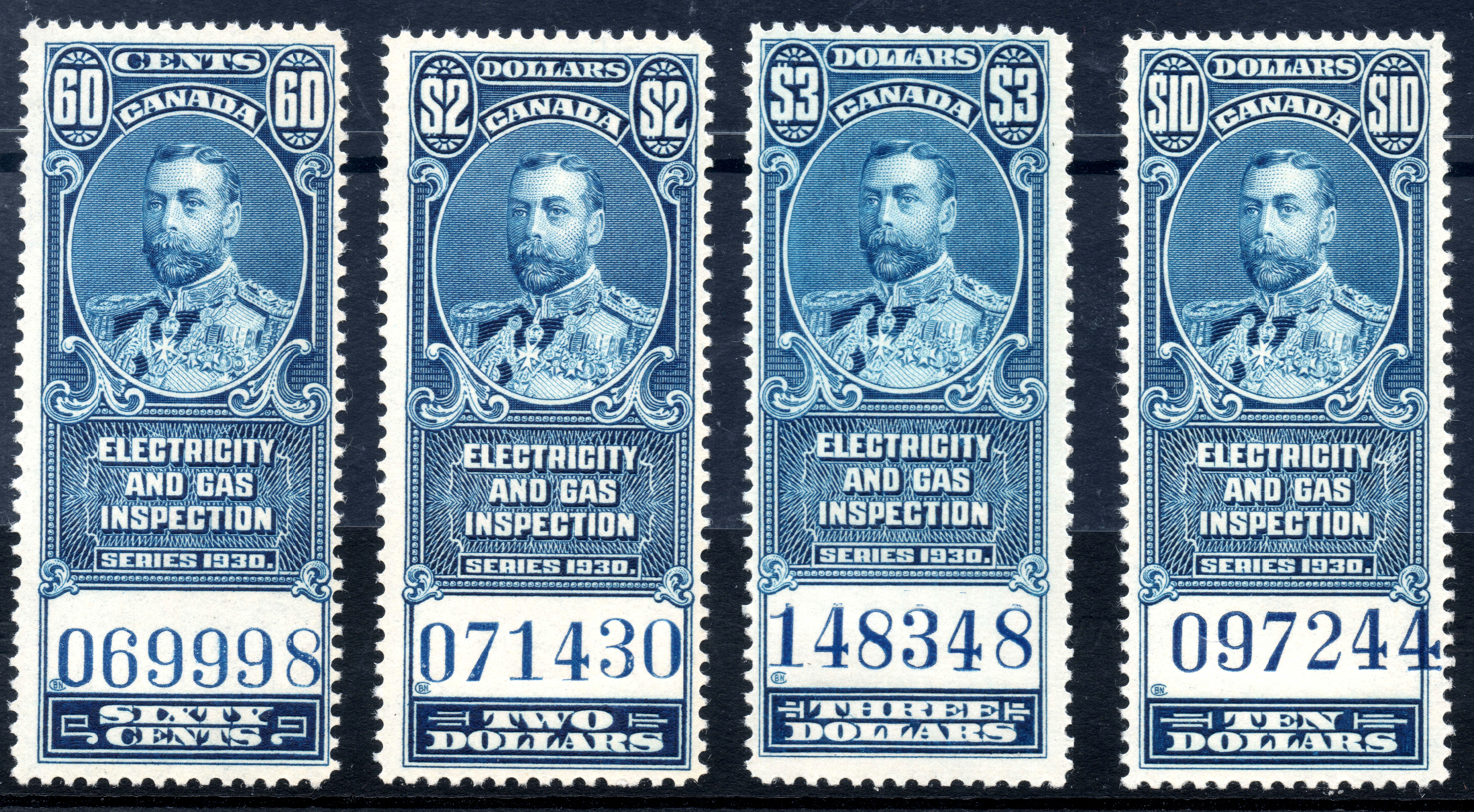
A set of Canadian electricity and gas inspection stamps from 1930

Canada issued revenue stamps were issued from 1864 to 2005. In addition to national issues, the provinces of Alberta, British Columbia, Manitoba, New Brunswick, Newfoundland, Nova Scotia, Ontario, Prince Edward Island, Quebec (Lower Canada), Saskatchewan and Yukon as well as Cape Breton, Halifax, Morden, Saskatoon and Winnipeg also had their own stamps.

== See also ==
- Postage stamps and postal history of Canada
