= Charles Henry Jeens =

English engraver (1827–1879)

Charles Henry Jeens (1827–1879) was an English engraver.

== Life ==
The son of Henry and Matilda Jeens, he was born at Uley in Gloucestershire on 19 October 1827. He learned engraving from John Brain and William Greatbach.

Jeens died, after a long illness, on 22 October 1879, and was buried in Highgate Cemetery.

== Works ==
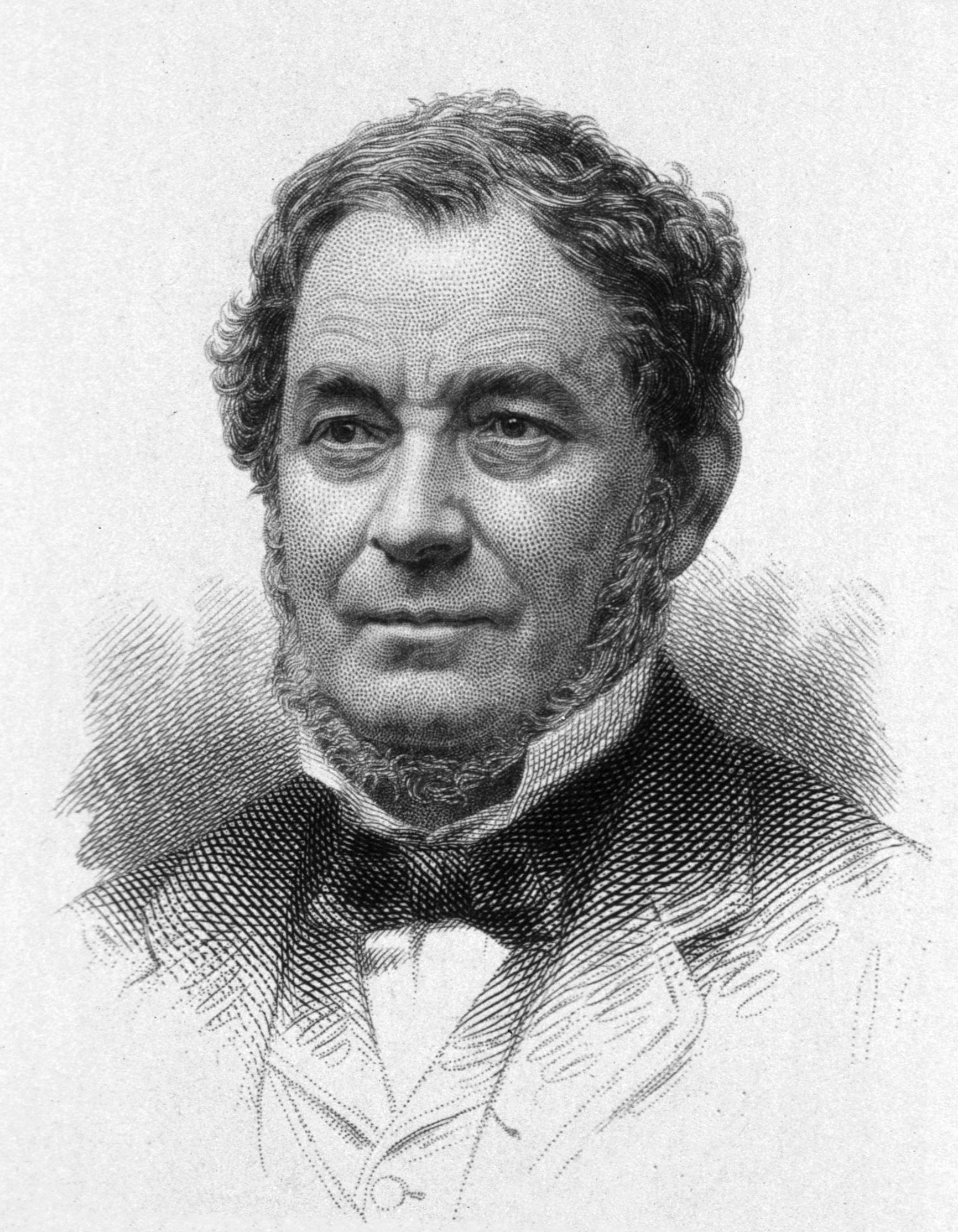
Robert Bunsen, engraving by Jeens

Early in his career, Jeens worked on postage stamps for British colonies. He was one of the engravers engaged on the Royal Gallery of Art (1854) edited by Samuel Carter Hall, and executed plates for The Art Journal. About 1860 he became associated with Macmillan & Co., for whose Golden Treasury series and other publications he produced many vignettes, and portraits including a series of Scientific Worthies in Nature.

In 1863 Jeens completed for the Art Union of London a plate begun by Henry Chawner Shenton from Thomas Francis Dicksee's A Labour of Love; and one of his final works was Joseph and Mary, after Edward Armitage, published by the same society in 1877. Other plates were:

- George Romney's Lady Hamilton at the Spinning-wheel
- John Everett Millais's Reverie
- the "Head of a Girl", after Leonardo da Vinci, for Walter Pater's Studies in the History of the Renaissance;
- John Leighton's Albert, Prince Consort Commemorative Tazza, 1862–63; and
- The Queen and Prince Consort fording the Poll Tarff, after Carl Haag, engraved for the queen's Journal of our Life in the Highlands, 1868

== Notes ==
Attribution

This article incorporates text from a publication now in the public domain: "Jeens, Charles Henry". Dictionary of National Biography. London: Smith, Elder & Co. 1885–1900.
