= Henry Brittan Willis =

English painter (1810–1884)

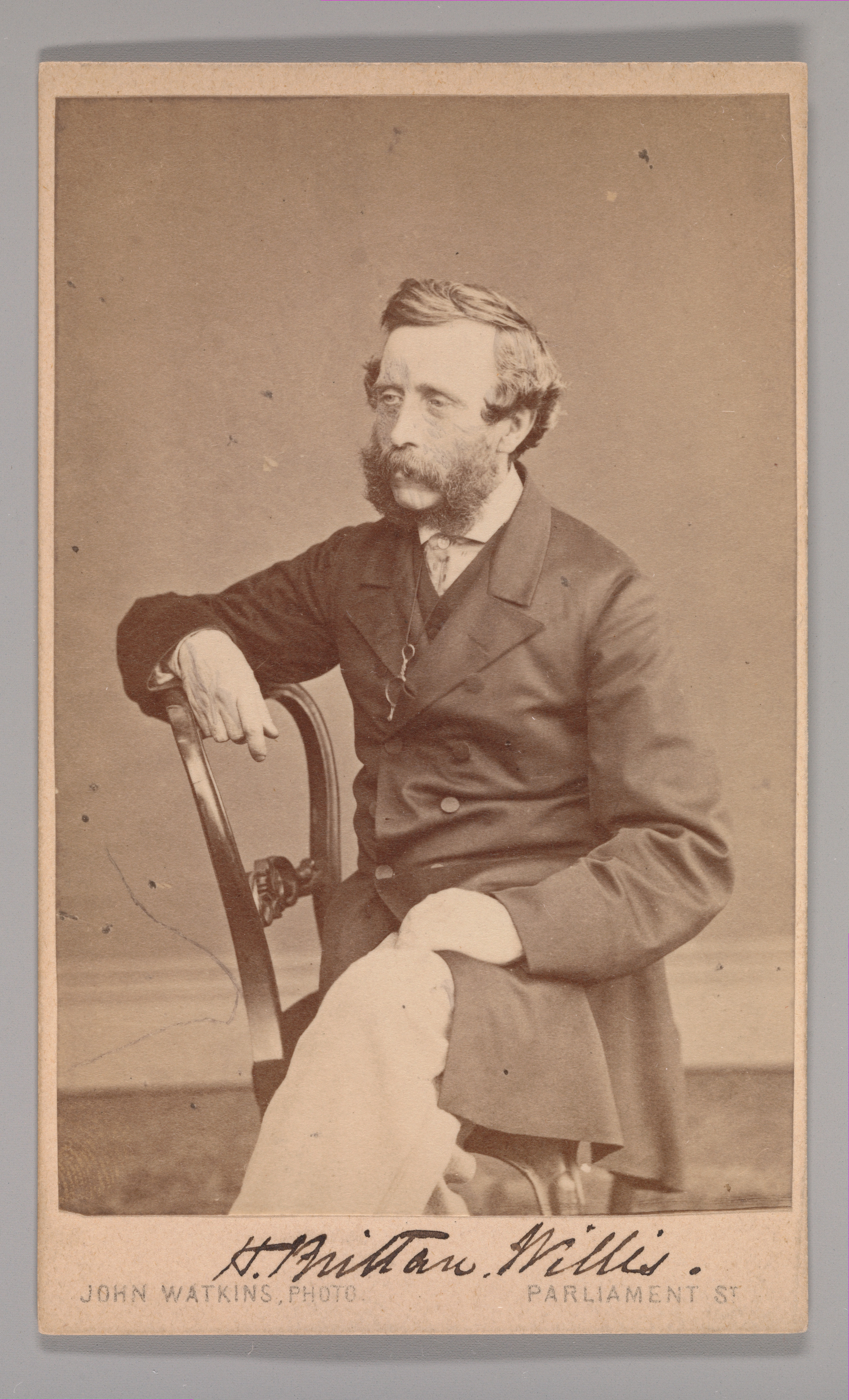
- Henry Brittan Willis (1860s)
- Born: 1810; Bristol, England
- Died: 17 January 1884 (aged 73–74); Kensington, London, England
- Occupation: painter
- Known for: landscape and animal paintings
- Spouse: Elizabeth Anne Broughton (m. 1837)
- Father: G. H. Willis

Henry Brittan Willis RWS (1810 – 17 January 1884) was an English landscape and animal painter.

== Life and work ==
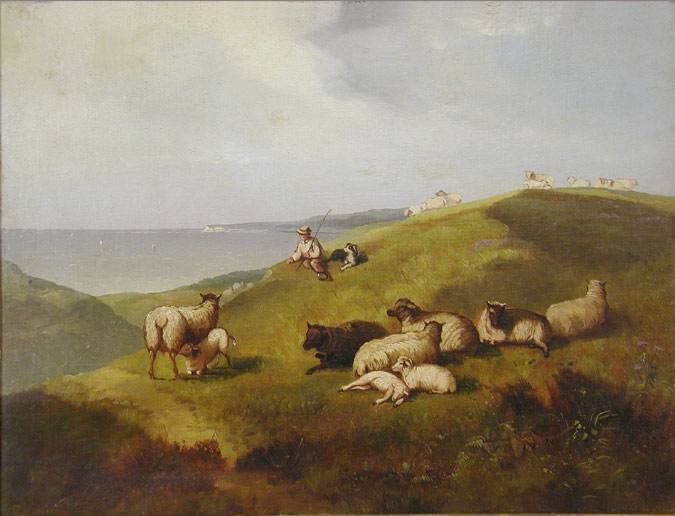
Landscape with sheep herder and dog

Willis was born in Bristol and worked initially with his father, G. H. Willis, also a landscape painter.

On 3 August 1837, Willis married Elizabeth Anne Broughton at St James's Church, Bristol, the youngest daughter of Edward Broughton of Kingsdown, Kent.

In 1842, after little financial success in his native city, and on the advice of his father, he traveled to New York, USA, to take up a job in a merchant's office. Owing to ill-health, he eventually had to relinquish the post and return to England, where he initially practiced as a portrait painter in Bristol.

In 1843 Willis settled in London where he gained a considerable reputation as a painter of landscapes and animals. From 1844 to 1862, he exhibited frequently at the galleries of the Royal Academy, British Institution (in Pall Mall) and Society of British Artists (in Suffolk street). He also showed his work outside London at places like the Liverpool Academy of Arts etc. From 1851-57 he was a member of the "Free Exhibitions" society. In 1862 he was elected an associate of the "Old" Watercolour Society (RWS), becoming a full member in 1863; He was a frequent contributor to the society's exhibitions.

Willis painted rural landscapes all over England, Wales and Scotland, in both oils and watercolour, and often featuring groups of farm animals such as cattle or sheep. He sometimes worked in collaboration with other artist such as F W Hulme. Four of his pictures were engraved for the "Art Union (AUL) Annual" of 1847. In 1849, he published "Studies of cattle and rustic figures" (London: George Rowney and Co.).

On 13 January 1873, 30 years of Willis's art work (including "studies from nature and some paintings" was destroyed in a fire at the "London Pantechnicon" in Motcombe street, Belgravia.

Willis died at his home at 12 Palace Gardens Terrace, Kensington, London, in January 1884, and was buried at Kensington cemetery at Hanwell, Middlesex (now in West London).

In 1902, the new Royal National Lifeboat Institution (RNLI) lifeboat placed at Greencastle on the Inishowen peninsula in Ireland, was named Brittan Willis (ON 492), funded from the bequest of £644-13s-9d from his widow, the late Elizabeth Ann Willis, in memory of her husband.

Willis was eclipsed by Constable, both in his lifetime and after it, but he has in recent years enjoyed a revival in interest.

== Paintings ==
The following list is not necessarily complete. It shows either the date painted, or, if accompanied by a named gallery, the date at which the painting was exhibited:

Landscape with cattle (RA, 1846 - collaboration with Frederick William Hulme) • River Avon, near Bristol, with the Tower of Cook's Folly • A Quiet Homestead in Surrey (British Institution, 1855) • Early Morning - going a-field (1855 Paris Exposition) • A sunny scene on the Severn (1855 Paris Exposition) • Lights and shadows on the Conway (Society of British Artists, 1855) • Scene in the valley of the Lleddr (Liverpool Academy, 1855) • Harvest Horses (1856) • A Family Group (British Institution, 1857) • Oxen, Mid-Day Rest • Blessings of a shepherd's life (1862) • Harvesting in Sussex • Harvesting:Sunset (1863, watercolour) • Highland Cattle (1866) • Ben Cruachan cattle coming south (1867) • Farm Horses (RWS, 1867) • View near Coal Pit Heath (Bristol Society of Artists, 1840) • Hastings Castle by Moonlight • View of the Castle of Kautz (watercolour) • Drover with cattle watering • Landscape with sheepherder and dog • Landscape with figure on a Log in the Foreground (watercolour) • A Group of Cows (1871).

For others see : Graves, Algernon. Art Sales from 18th to 20th century, Volume 3 (Burt, Franklin, New York, 1970).
