= Canadian definitive postage stamps =

Category of postage stamps issued by Canada Post

Canada Post has issued several definitive stamps series since the Dominion of Canada was formed in 1867 featuring both novel and recurring themes. See Postage stamps and postal history of Canada for an overview and for history prior to federation.

Details of stamp issues have been collected and published in various stamp catalogues and in recent decades Canada Post has been issuing regular bulletins.

== Victorian period ==
The new Canadian government issued a series of stamps on April 1, 1868 featuring a profile of Queen Victoria, superseding previous issues by the separate colonies. These are known as the "Large Queens" comprising the following stamps:

Date of Issue	Denomination	Color	Quantity	Perforation	Watermark
	½c	black		12x12, 11½x12	
	1c	brown-red		12x12	
	1c	orange		12x12	
	2c	green		12x12	
	3c	red		12x12	
	5c	olive		12x12, 11½x12	
	6c	brown		12x12	
	21½c	blue		12x12	
	15c	purple		12x12	
	15c	blue-grey		12x12	

These were followed by the "Small Queens" in 1870.

Date of Issue	Denomination	Color	Quantity	Perforation	Watermark
	½c	black		12x12	
	1c	yellow		12x12, 11½x12	
	2c	green		12x12, 11½x12	
	3c	red		12x12, 11½x12	
	3c	orange		12x12	
	5c	slate		12x12, 11½x12	
	5c	grey		12x12	
	½c	black		12x12	
	6c	brown		12x12, 11½x12	
	6c	red-brown		12x12	
	8c	blue-grey		12x12	
	10c	dark rose		12x12, 11½x12	
	10c	brown		12x12	

These were followed by the "Maple Leaf" issue in 1897.

== King Edward VII ==
Upon the accession of King Edward VII, the Maple Leaf design framing a portrait of Edward was issued starting 1903.

== King George V ==
King George V was depicted in 1911 as Admiral of the Fleet in design that continued in use until 1928.

The "Scroll" issue of 1928 was the first bilingual stamp issue and also featured pictorial designs for the high values.

This was followed in 1930 by the "Arch" series which also included high value pictorials.

The "Medallion" series was issued from 1932.

The final King George V definitive series was issued in 1935.

== King George VI ==
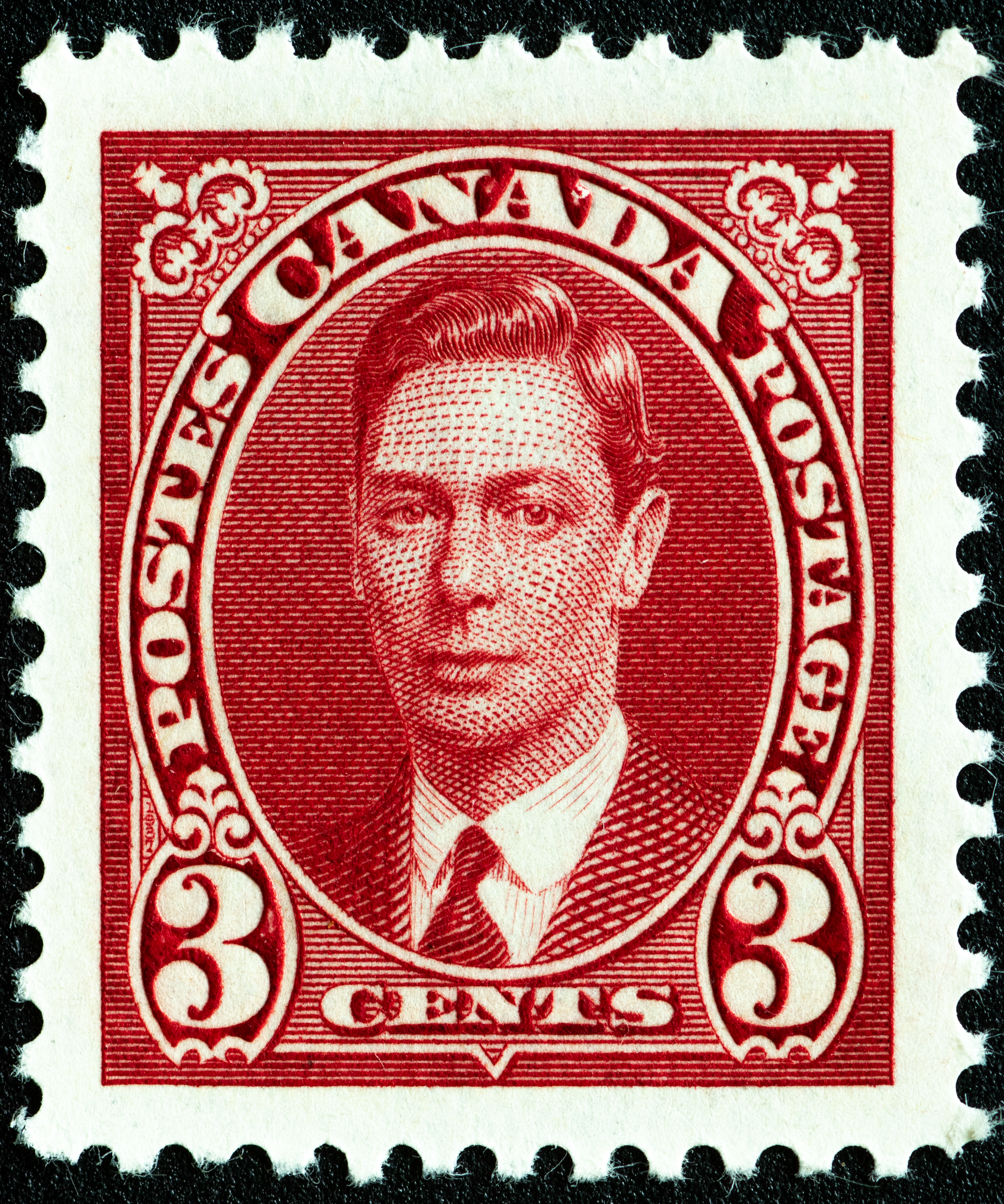
1937 series

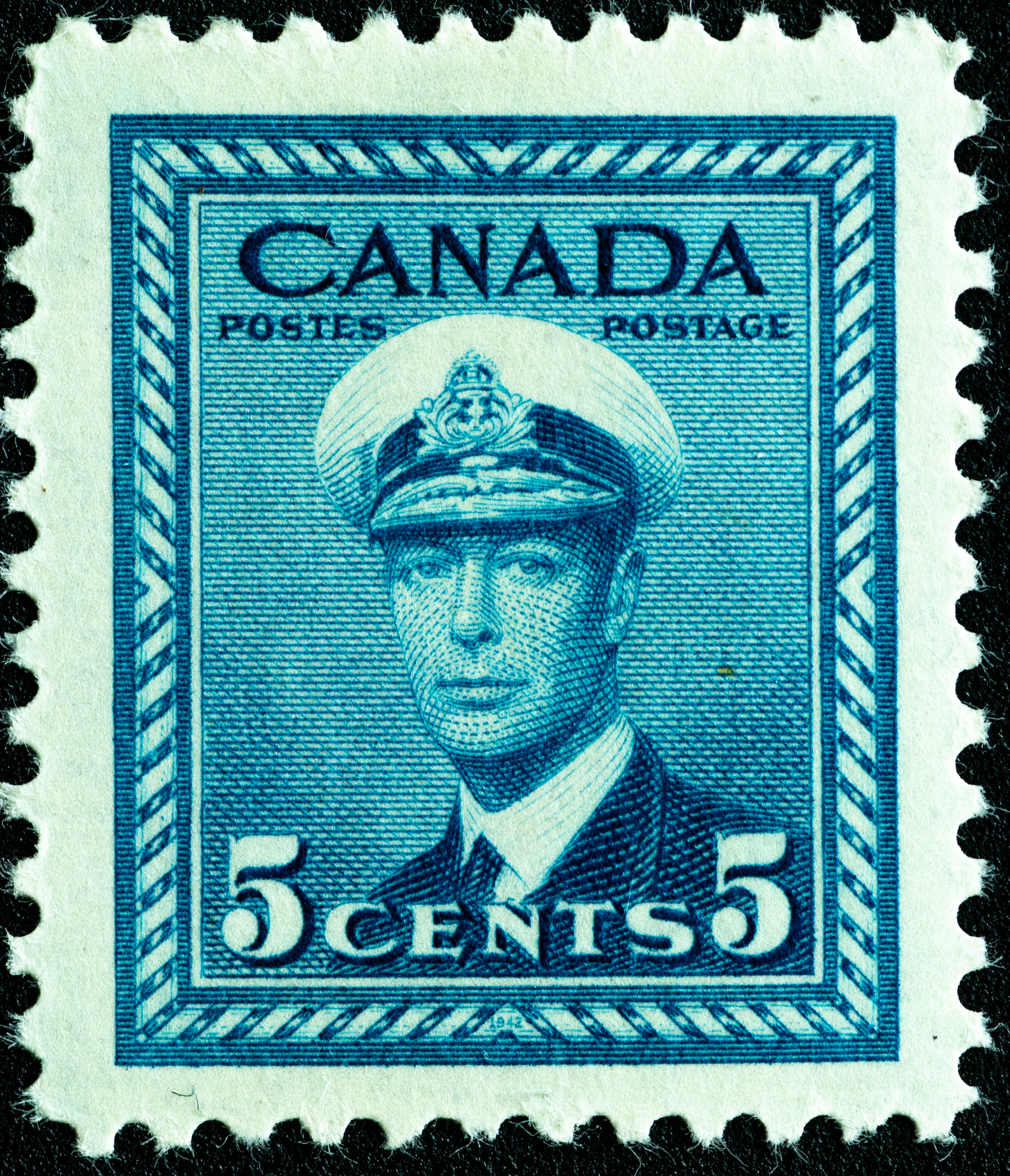
1942 series

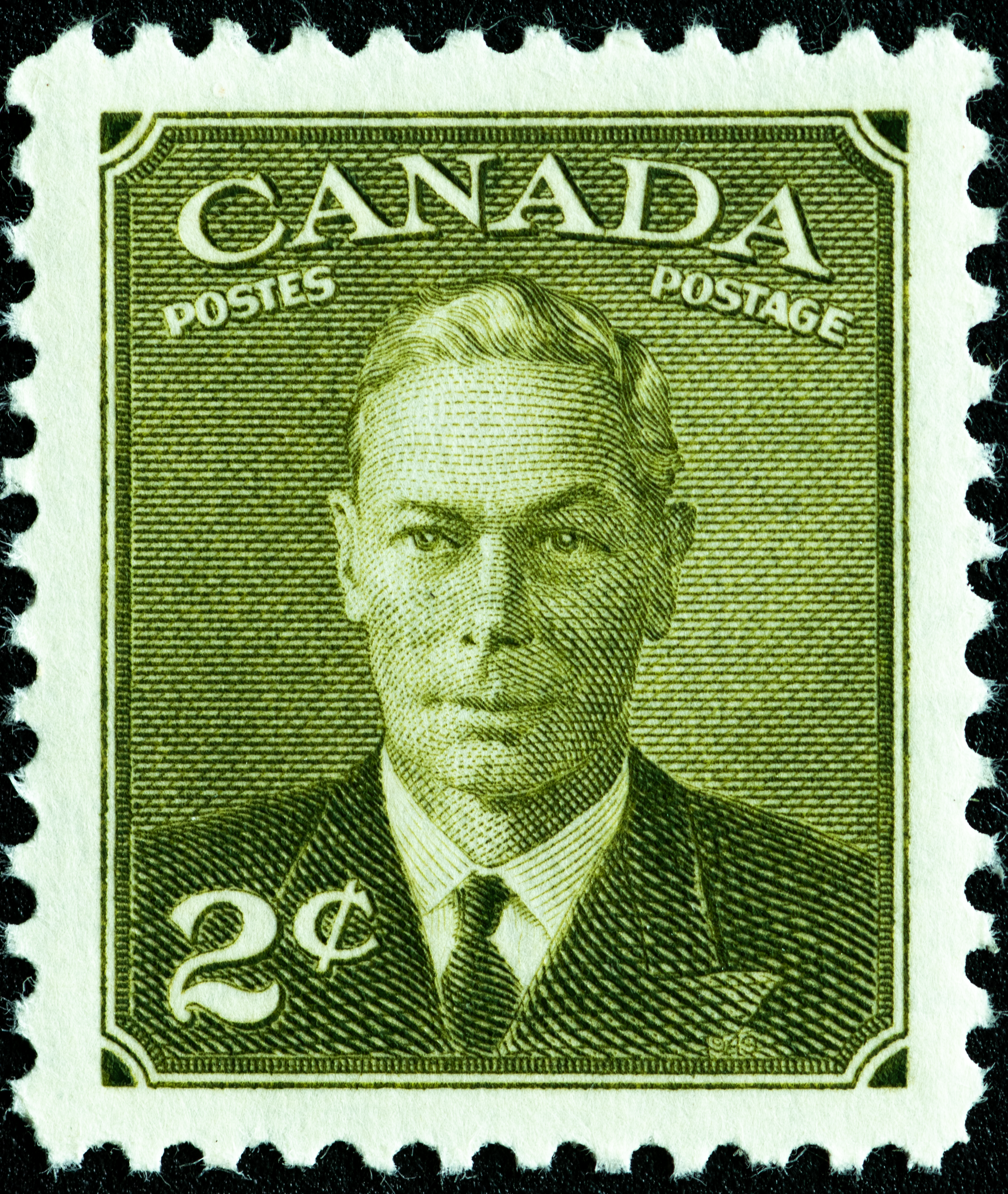
1949 series

There were three sets of definitives featuring King George VI, the first series starting in 1937.

This was followed by the "War Issue", starting in 1942.

The final King George VI definitives depicted the king in a much plainer design and were issued starting in 1949.

== Queen Elizabeth II ==
Upon her accession to the throne following the death of King George VI, a definitive series depicting Queen Elizabeth II was issued in 1953. The design for the issue was from a photograph supplied by Karsh, of Ottawa. The stamps are engraved and printed by the Canadian Bank Note Company, Limited, Ottawa.

Date of Issue	Scott #	Denomination	Color	Quantity	Perforation
1 May 1953	325	1c	violet brown	169,000,000	12
1 May 1953	326	2c	green	338,000,000	12
1 May 1953	327	3c	red	332,000,000	12
1 May 1953	328	4c	violet	406,000,000	12
1 May 1953	329	5c	blue	109,000,000	12

This was quickly followed by a series in 1954 featuring the Queen's Wilding portrait.

Date of Issue	Denomination	Color	Quantity	Perforation
	1c	violet brown		12
	2c	green		12, 9½ x imperf.
	3c	red		12
	4c	violet		12, 9½ x imperf.
	5c	blue		12, 9½ x imperf.
	6c	orange		12

The next series of Canadian definitives starting in 1962 again featured the Queen.

Date of Issue	Denomination	Color	Quantity	Perforation
	1c	brown	478M	12
	2c	green	440M	12
	3c	purple	585M	12
	4c	red	1,452M	12
	5c	blue	1,489M	12

The following series starting in 1967 featured the Queen and pictorials for the high values.

== Post 1970 ==
The series starting from 1972 featured Canadian prime ministers for the low values, the Queen for the base rate and pictorials for the high values.

The next definitive series began in 1977. It featured Canadian flora, the Queen and parliament buildings for low values, larger flora designs for medium values, and street scenes and national parks for high values.

Date of Issue	Denomination	Design/Color	Perforation
Flora, small size
22 April 1977	1c	Bottle Gentian	12x12.5, 13x13.5
22 April 1977	2c	Western Columbine	12x12.5, 13x13.5
22 April 1977	3c	Canada Lily	12x12.5, 13x13.5
22 April 1977	4c	Hepatica	12x12.5, 13x13.5
22 April 1977	5c	Shooting Star	12x12.5, 13x13.5
22 April 1977	10c	Sparrow's Egg Lady's Slipper	12x12.5, 13, 13x13.5
6 July 1978	12c	Jewelweed	13x13.5
16 August 1979	15c	Canada Violet	13x13.5
Flora, medium size
8 August 1977	15c	Trembling Aspen	13.5
8 August 1977	20c	Douglas Fir	13.5
8 August 1977	25c	Sugar Maple	13.5
7 March 1978	30c	Red Oak	13.5
8 March 1979	35c	Eastern White Pine	13.5
Street scenes
6 July 1978	50c	prairie town street scene	13.5
11 May 1982	60c	Ontario street scene	13.5
6 July 1978	75c	Quebec street scene	13.5
6 July 1978	80c	Atlantic coast street scene	13.5
National parks
24 January 1979	$1	Fundy National Park	13.5
?	$1	?	?
18 June 1982	$1.50	Waterton Lakes National Park	13.5
27 April 1979	$2	Kluane National Park	13.5
21 June 1985	$2	Banff National Park	13.5
10 January 1983	$5	Point Pelee National Park	13.5
?	$5	?	?
