= Frederick Edward Hulme =

English painter (1841–1909)

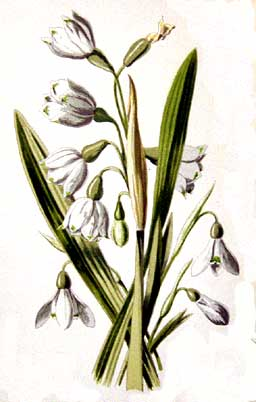
Snowdrop and snowflake by Hulme

Frederick Edward Hulme (March 1841 – 10 April 1909) was known as a teacher and an amateur botanist. He was the Professor of Freehand and Geometrical Drawing at King's College London from 1886. His most famous work was Familiar Wild Flowers, which was issued in nine volumes.

== Life ==
Frederick Edward Hulme was born to Frederick William Hulme and his wife Caroline (born Jackson). He was born in March 1841 in Hanley, Staffordshire.

In 1844 his family moved to London where his father taught and worked as a landscape painter. Not only was Hulme's father an accomplished landscape painter, but his maternal grandmother had also been a painter of porcelain. Hulme attended South Kensington School of Art, which is now called the Royal College of Art.

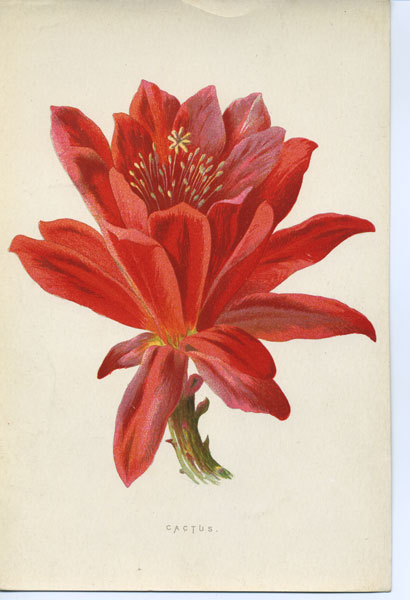
Cactus flower

Hulme became the drawing master at Marlborough College in 1870. While there he started work on his most famous work, Familiar Wild Flowers, which was issued in parts as not only did it contain a detailed description of each flower but also its medicinal uses and habitat. The major work was the botanical illustration by Hulme of each flower which was recreated as a colour plate in each volume. In his lifetime, Hulme completed nine volumes which were published at intervals.

Hulme was an amateur botanist, antiquarian and natural historian and in 1869 he was elected a Fellow of the Linnean Society. He was drawing master at Marlborough until 1883.

He was the Professor of Freehand and Geometrical Drawing at King's College London from 1886. Drawing was not part of the standard curriculum at Kings, but, as was common in many colleges, students could enroll for an additional course in drawing with Hulme. In the preceding year he had become a lecturer to the Agricultural Association.

Botany seems not to be his only interest as he also published books on heraldry, and on cryptography (Cryptography, the History, Principles, and Practice of Cipher-Writing) - a brief history and an explanation of various techniques of cryptography to his day (end of 19th century).

Hulme died at his home at Kew on 10 April 1909. His ninth volume of Familiar Wild Flowers was in production. This and the earlier other eight volumes were published after his death.

== Works ==
- Plant Form, 1868
- Bards & Blossoms; or The Poetry, History, and Associations of Flowers, London, Marcus Ward & Co., 1877
- Familiar wild flowers, 1878–1905, ninth volume posthumous
- Suggestions in Floral Design, 1880
- Natural history, lore and legend, 1895
- Wild fruits of the country-side, 1902
- Proverb Lore: Many sayings, wise or otherwise, on many subjects, gleaned from many sources, 1902
- Butterflies and moths of the countryside, 1903
- Wild Flowers in their Seasons, 1907
- Familiar Swiss flowers, 1908
- The history, principles and practice of heraldry, London, Swan Sonnenschein & co., 1892.
- Cryptography, the History, Principles, and Practice of Cipher-Writing, London, Ward, Lock and Co. Ltd. 1898

=== Prose ===
- Myth-land, 1886
- The Town, College, and Neighbourhood of Marlborough, 1881
- The Flags of The World: Their History, Blazonry, and Associations, 1887

=== Illustration ===
- Sylvan spring by F.G.Heath (illustration only)
- Familiar garden flowers by Shirley Hibberd (Illustration only)
