= William James Grant =

English painter (1829–1866)

William James Grant (1829 – 2 June 1866) was an English painter.

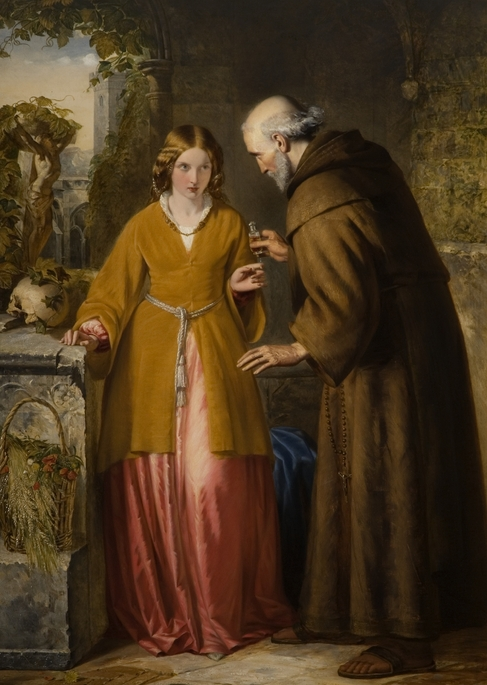
Juliet and the Friar 'Take thou this phial; painting of a scene from Shakespeare's Romeo and Juliet by William James Grant

== Life ==
He was born in Hackney, east London. He attended Benjamin Robert Haydon's lectures, and won two prizes from the Royal Society of Arts. In 1844 he became a student of the Royal Academy, and in 1847, while still a student, exhibited his first picture, Boys with Rabbits.

Grant died on 2 June 1866, at the age of 37.

== Works ==
In 1848 Grant showed Edward the Black Prince entertaining the French King after the Battle of Poitiers at the Royal Academy. During the next few years he painted mainly religious subjects, such as Christ casting out the Devils at Gadara (1850) and Samson and Delilah (1852). In 1853 he reverted to historical subjects, and among his later pictures were Mozart's Requiem (1854), Scene from the Early Life of Queen Elizabeth (1857), Eugene Beauharnais refusing to give up the Sword of his Father (1858), The Morning of the Duel (1860), and The Last Relics of Lady Jane Grey (1861). In 1866 he exhibited The Lady and the Wasp and Reconciliation. A picture of The Widow's Cruse of Oil, painted for a private commission, was exhibited at Liverpool.

Grant also executed drawings in red and black chalk, mostly illustrations to poetry.
