= John Watkins (photographer) =

English photographer

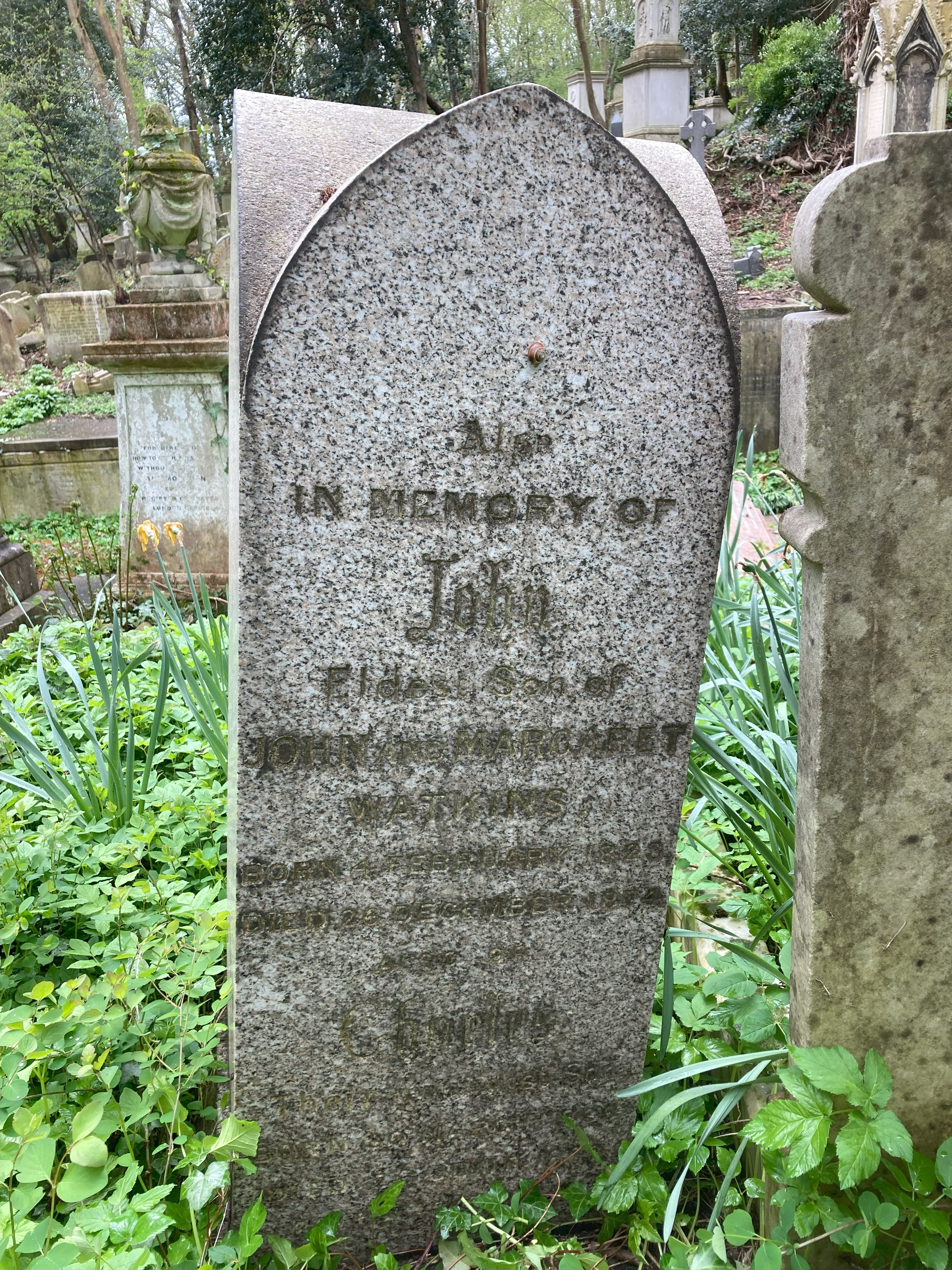
- Grave of John Watkins in Highgate Cemetery
- Born: February 4, 1823; Raglan, Monmouthshire, Wales
- Died: December 25, 1874 (aged 51)
- Occupation: Portrait photographer
- Relatives: George Herbert Watkins (brother); Octavius Charles Watkins (brother)

John Watkins (4 February 1823 – 26 December 1874) was an English portrait photographer.

== Biography ==
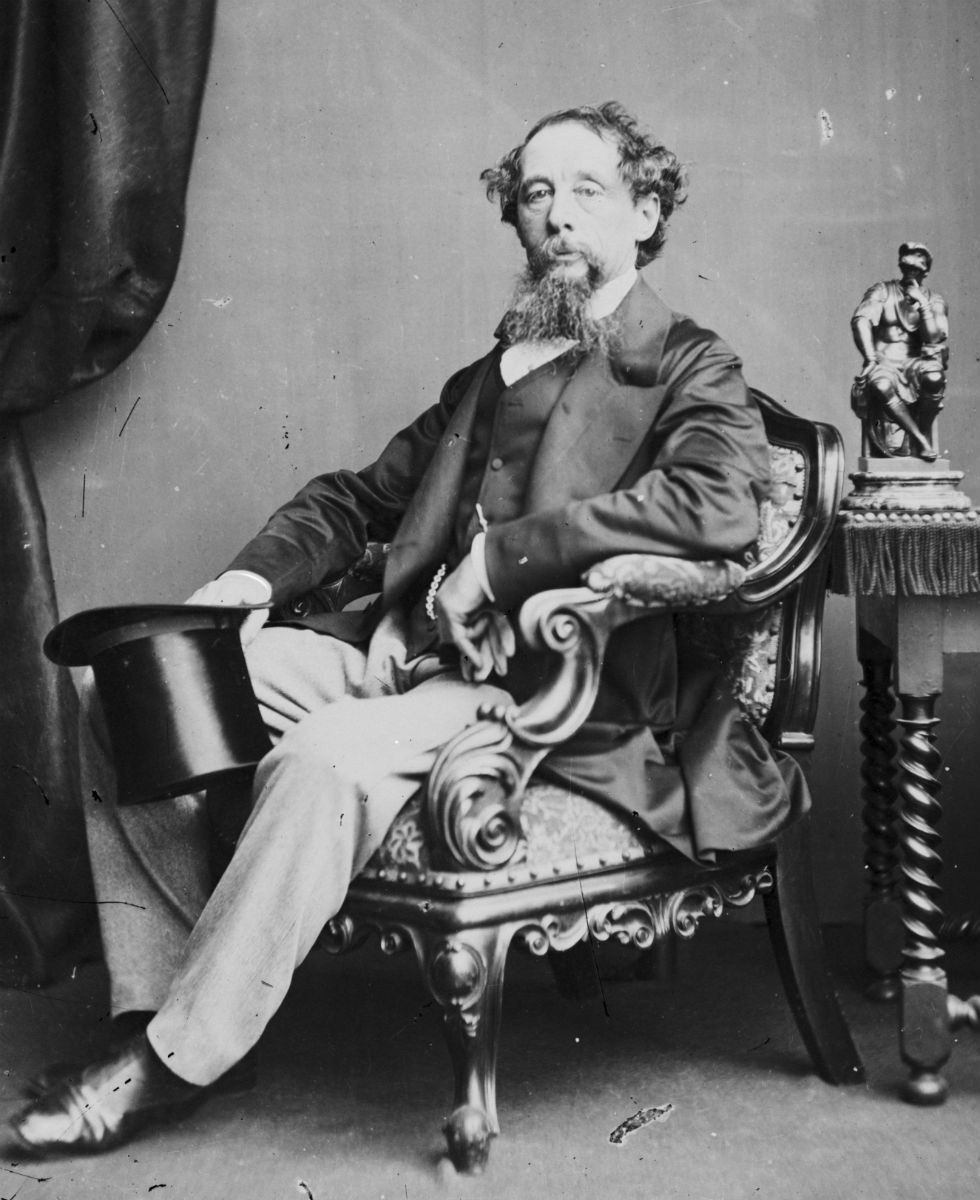
Dickens by John Watkins (c. 1860)

John Watkins was born on 4 February 1823 in Raglan, Monmouthshire, in Wales.

He and his brother Octavius Charles Watkins (1836–1882) often worked together. John Watkins' second brother, George Herbert Watkins (1828–1916) was also influenced by his brothers to become a photographer. They made studio portraits of artists and culturally influential people between the years 1840 and 1875.

Among their sitters were many notables of the Victorian era, including Charles Dickens, the Prince of Wales, John Stuart Mill, Thomas Carlyle, Charles Kingsley, Carlo Marochetti, Carl Haag and many others.

John died on 26 December 1874, aged 51, and was buried on the west side of Highgate Cemetery.
