= Frederick William Hulme =

English painter (1816–1884)

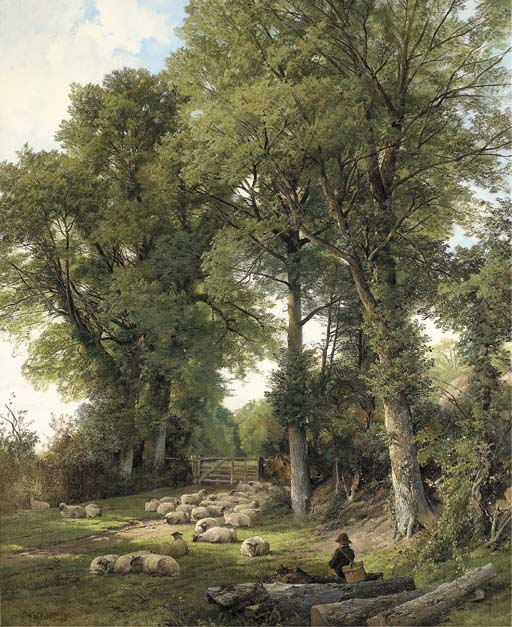
Sheep Resting in a Woodland Glade (1865)

Frederick William Hulme (22 October 1816 – 14 November 1884) was an English landscape painter and illustrator.

Hulme was born in Swinton in Yorkshire, the son of Jesse Hulme and Elizabeth Trewolla. His mother was a porcelain painter and it was from her that he received his first lessons. He first exhibited in 1841 in Birmingham.

Hulme married Caroline Jackson. Their only son, Frederick Edward Hulme, born in March 1841 in Hanley, Staffordshire, became a notable teacher, writer and amateur botanist known for his drawings of flowers.

In 1844 Hulme moved to London where he provided designs for engravers for publications such as The Art Journal. The 1851 census showed him living at 4 Hereford Square. He practiced as a teacher of drawing and painting and, in 1850, published a text book in 4 parts called A Graduated Series of Drawing Copies on Landscape Subjects for Use of Schools. He illustrated a number of books including Edgar Allan Poe's Poetical Works of E. A. Poe in 1853, and Samuel Carter Hall's Book of South Wales in 1861. He occasionally worked on pictures in conjunction with other artists, including Henry Brittan Willis.

Hulme is known for his landscape paintings of Surrey and Wales—he was a frequent visitor to Betws-y-Coed in the Conwy valley—but he also painted in other areas of the country. A part work publication entitled The Land We Live In included several views of the Potteries in Staffordshire.

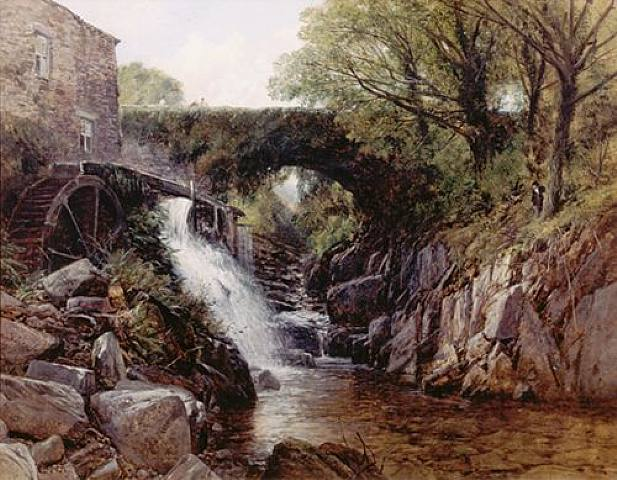
Pont Hoogan Mill

Hulme notably exhibited work at the Royal Academy from 1852 to 1884, the British Institution from 1845 to 1862, the Royal Manchester Institution and other smaller galleries. The brightness and precision of his landscapes have been compared to those of William Shayer and to Thomas Creswick - another Birmingham artist who had first exhibited fourteen years before.

Hulme died in Kensington, London in 1884.

In 2002, an 1865 Hulme landscape, Sheep Resting in a Woodland Glade sold for £33,000 at Christie's auction house, London.

== Bibliography ==
- A Graduated Series of Drawing Copies on Landscape Subjects for Use of Schools (1850).
