= John Cross (artist) =

English painter (1819–1861)

John Cross (29 May 1819 – 26 February 1861) was an English painter.

== Life ==
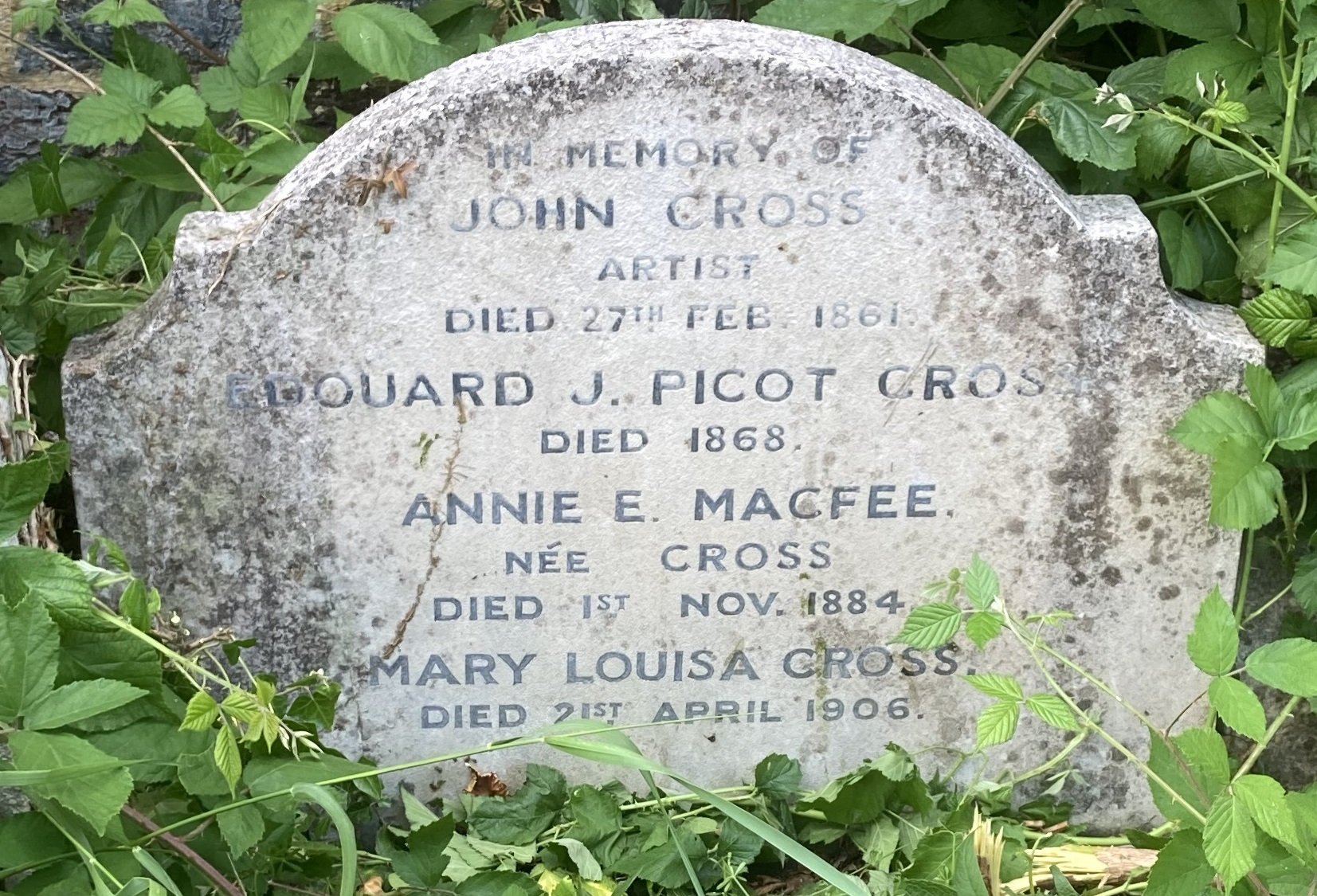
Family grave of John Cross in Highgate Cemetery

Cross was born on 29 May 1819 to John and Elizabeth Cross, in Tiverton, Devon, where his father was the superintendent of a lace factory. Soon afterwards the family moved to Saint-Quentin, in northern France, when his father took up an appointment as superintendent of an English factory. There the young Cross was admitted into the School of Design, where he showed so much ability that he was sent to Paris, where he entered the atelier of Picot, a painter of some celebrity in the old classic school.

In 1843 Cross submitted a cartoon of The Assassination of Thomas à Becket to the competition for the decoration of the Houses of Parliament, held in Westminster Hall, but was unsuccessful as it did not fully comply with the terms of the competition. A second attempt in 1847, with an oil painting of The Clemency of Coeur-de-Lion, won him the first prize of £300, and was later purchased by the royal commissioners for £1,000.

In 1850 he exhibited at the Royal Academy for the first time, his subject being The Burial of the Young Princes in the Tower. This was followed by Edward the Confessor leaving his Crown to Harold in 1851; The Death of Thomas à Becket in 1853; Lucy Preston's Petition in 1856; and The Coronation of William the Conqueror in 1859; but none of Cross's later productions equalled his first effort.

Following his death in London in 1861, his friends bought his Assassination of Thomas à Becket and placed it in Canterbury Cathedral.

He is buried in a family grave above the Terrace Catacombs on the west side of Highgate Cemetery.
