= Art Union of London =

The Art Union of London (1837–1912) was an organisation which distributed works of art amongst its subscribers by lottery.

== Art unions ==
Art unions were organisations created to function as patrons of art. Members would pay a small annual subscription. The union would spend the subscriptions on works of contemporary art, which were distributed among its members by means of a lottery. The idea emerged in Switzerland at the beginning of the 19th century, and was imitated in various German territories. It was introduced to England in the late 1830s on the recommendation of a House of Commons Select Committee on the Arts and Manufactures in the United Kingdom.

== Foundation ==
The Art Union of London was established in 1837, following the establishment of similar organisations in Edinburgh and Liverpool. It described its aim as being "to aid in extending the love of the Arts of Design, and to give Encouragement to Artists beyond that afforded by the patronage of individuals." Its first meeting was led by four young social radicals: Edward Edwards, Henry Hayward, George Godwin and Lewis Pocock. By the end of the year a formal management committee had been formed, which included the architect Charles Barry, William Ewart MP, chairman of the 1835 select committee, N.W. Ridley Colborne MP, who had also been a member of the select committee and Lord Prudhoe, later Duke of Northumberland. The committee was to prove stable, with nine of the original members still serving in 1857.

In its first year, 1837, the union raised only £480; by 1842, however, annual subscription revenue stood at almost £13,000 a figure that would remain fairly stable for twenty years. By 1876 there were more than 20,000 members. The Union persuaded Samuel Carter Hall, editor of The Art Journal, to publish the Union's documents and reports in his magazine, and to promote the annual exhibition of its prizes.

== Membership and its benefits ==
Each member paid a subscription of one guinea a year. In return they all received a large engraving annually, said to be at least equal in value to their subscription. In addition they had the chance of winning a prize at a yearly draw, initially either a proof copy of that year's print, or a painting. The committees of earlier art unions had selected the prize works for their members, but the winners of Art Union of London prizes had a free choice of any painting, up to a given value, shown at any of the London exhibitions that year. At a draw held early on in the Union's history, in 1839, there were 62 prizes. They consisted of 20 proof impressions of the annual engraving, twenty impressions on India paper; nine pictures valued at £10, two at £30, four at £50, one at £100 and one at £150. At that year's meeting George Godwin announced the committee's intention to hold the draw at an earlier date in the future, to allow the winners' selections to be made before most of the best pictures had been sold. The annual engraving was, at least in the early years, selected from amongst the paintings chosen by the prize-winners.

As the number of subscribers increased, so did the value of the prizes, totalling about £9,000 annually at the peak of the Union's success. From the 1840s there were yearly exhibitions of the prize selections.

In addition to paintings and proof engravings the Art Union of London began to offer various specially manufactured "art objects" as prizes. In 1842 it launched a series of medals illustrating the history of British art. Thirty of each were cast in silver as prizes, and bronze versions were offered as an alternative to the annual print. In the same year the Union began to offer bronze statuettes as prizes. As a cheaper alternative they developed the idea of issuing sculptures in the unglazed porcelain known as "Parian Ware"; the first to be issued was John Gibson's Narcissus, produced by Copeland and Garrett in an edition of fifty in 1845 and offered in the following year's draw. The success of the venture led the Union to organise a competition for works that could be reproduced on a small scale in Parian.

== Dissolution ==
By 1895 the number of subscribers had fallen to below 5,000. The Union was wound up following a resolution passed in 1912.

== See also ==
- American Art-Union
