= Thomas Stephens (historian) =

Welsh historian (1821–1875)

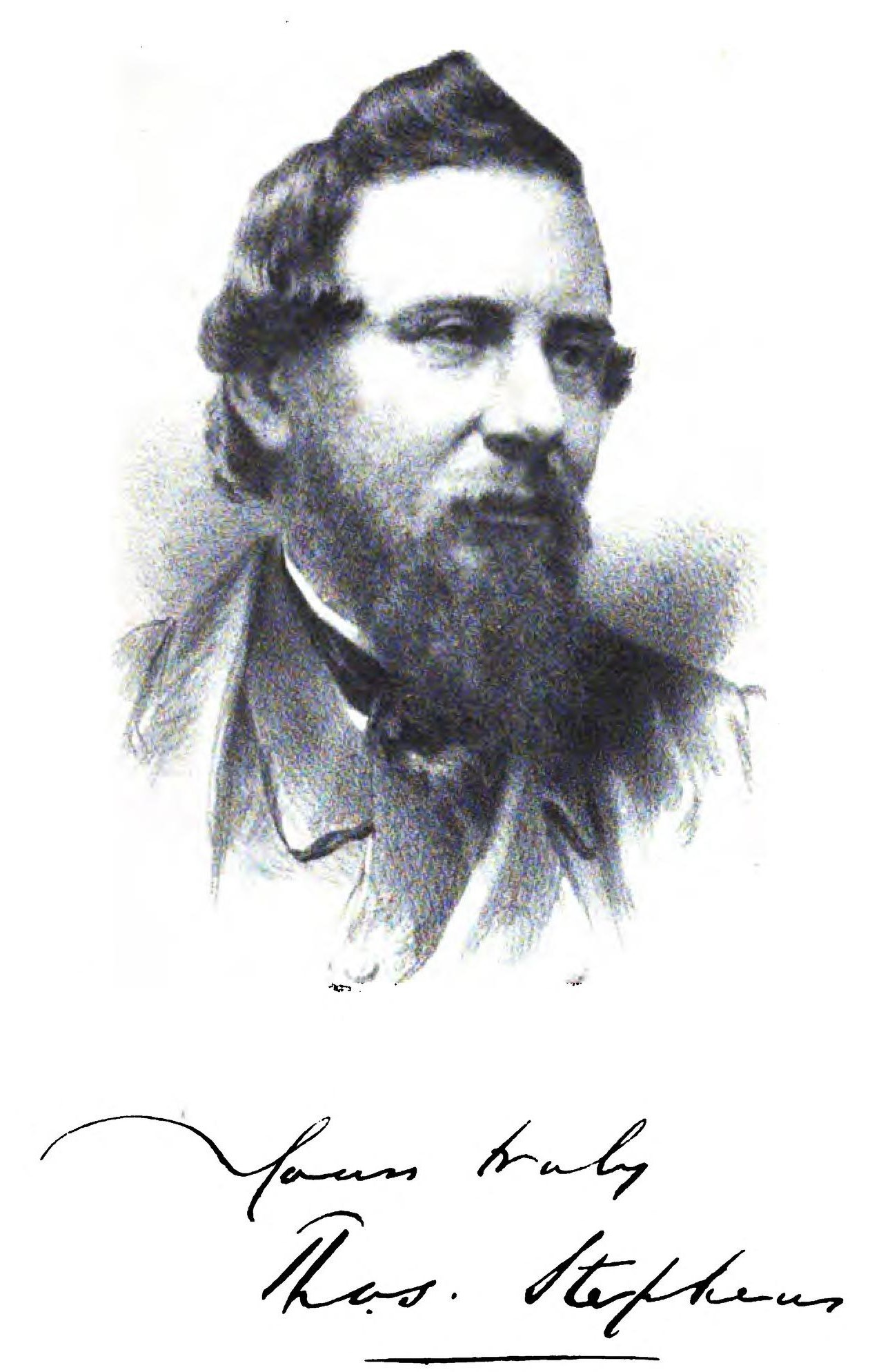
- Born: 21 April 1821; Pont Nedd Fechan, Glamorganshire, Wales
- Died: 4 January 1875 (aged 53); Merthyr Tydfil, Glamorganshire, Wales
- Occupation: Chemist and druggist
- Known for: Welsh historical literature, rigorous critical methods, social reform
- Notable work: • The Literature of the Kymry (1849,1876) • Madoc: An Essay on the Discovery of America by Madoc ap Owen Gwynedd in the Twelfth Century (1858,1893) • Orgraff yr Iaith Gymraeg (1859) (an orthography of Welsh)

Thomas Stephens (Bardic names: Casnodyn, Gwrnerth, Caradawg) (21 April 1821 – 4 January 1875) was a Welsh historian, literary critic, and social reformer. His works include The Literature of the Kymry (1849,1876), Madoc: An Essay on the Discovery of America by Madoc ap Owen Gwynedd in the Twelfth Century (1858,1893), and Orgraff yr Iaith Gymraeg (1859) (an orthography of Welsh), as well as a number of prize-winning essays presented at eisteddfodau between 1840 and 1858. He was the first Welsh historian and literary critic to employ rigorous scientific methods, and is considered to have done more to raise the standards of the National Eisteddfod than any other Welshman of his time. Stephens also figured prominently in efforts to implement social, educational and sanitary reforms both locally in Merthyr Tydfil and more broadly throughout Wales.

== Life ==
Thomas Stephens was born on 21 April 1821 at Pont Nedd Fechan, Glamorganshire, Wales, the son of a boot-maker. In 1835 he was apprenticed as a chemist and druggist in Merthyr Tydfil and took over the business in 1841. He was also appointed manager of the Merthyr Express newspaper in 1864.

Stephens suffered a series of strokes from 1868. He died on 4 January 1875 in Merthy Tydfil and was buried at Cefncoedycymmer cemetery.

== Writings ==
Stephens began submitting prize-winning essays to eisteddfodau from 1840. His bardic names were Casnodyn, Gwrnerth, and Caradawg. Stephens' book, The Literature of the Kymry (1849, 2nd ed. 1876), was based on his essay "The Literature of Wales during the Twelfth and Succeeding Centuries" which won the Prince of Wales Prize at the 1848 eisteddfod held in Abergavenny. In this work, Stephens pioneered the use of rigorous methods of literary criticism in the study of medieval Welsh literature.

Stephens' 1858 eisteddfod essay Madoc: An Essay on the Discovery of America by Madoc ap Owen Gwynedd in the Twelfth Century, which demolished Welsh claims of the discovery of the Americas by Madoc, was acknowledged as the outstanding submission. However, although convincing, the essay was not awarded the prize due to the adjudicators' reluctance to discard the old claims. Disgusted, Stephens refused to compete in future eisteddfod competitions.

Other works include Orgraff yr Iaith Gymraeg (1859) (an orthography of the Welsh language), articles for Archaeologia Cambrensis and the South Wales newspapers and Welsh periodicals, essays on the life and works of the bard Aneurin, and an English translation of Y Gododdin.

The rigorous methods of literary criticism applied in his works often made Stephens unpopular with the less discriminating enthusiasts for the glory of Wales, but he earned the respect of serious scholars.

Stephens' manuscripts and letters are included in the National Library of Wales General Manuscript Collection.

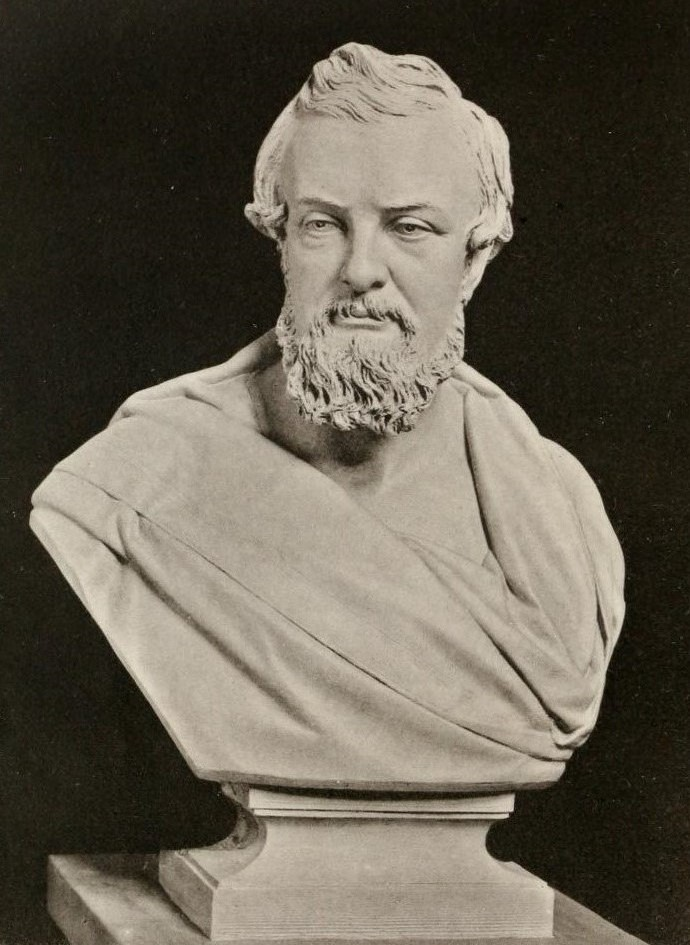
Bust of Thomas Stephens, c. 1871 by Joseph Edwards; presented to Stephens as a testimonial after 25 years as honorary secretary of the Merthyr Library

== Social reforms ==
With the encouragement and friendship of Lord Aberdare, Sir Josiah John Guest, and Lady Charlotte Guest, Stephens was a prominent promoter of welfare, education and sanitary schemes in Merthyr Tydfil and organised relief for families of victims of coal mine explosions. He was appointed High Constable of Merthyr in 1858.

== Legacy ==
Literary critic Meic Stephens states that Stephens "is generally considered to have been the first Welsh literary critic to adopt a scientific method and to have done more, as an adjudicator, to raise the standards of the National Eisteddfod and to win for it the confidence of scholars, than any other Welshman of his time". However, he also notes that author Emyr Humphreys presents a "less favourable view" in his 1983 work The Taliesin Tradition.

Stephens' modern biographer Marion Löffler describes his "main contributions to the shaping of Wales" in terms of his work to transform Merthyr's social organisation and modernise Welsh culture, and "his pioneering works of scholarship".

== Works ==
- Stephens, Thomas (1840). History of the Life and Times of Iestyn ab Gwrgant, the Last Native Lord of Glamorgan. (eisteddfod essay)
- Stephens, Thomas (1848). The Literature of Wales During the Twelfth and Succeeding Centuries. (eisteddfod essay)
- Stephens, Thomas (1876) [1849]. Sylvan Evans (ed.). The Literature of the Kymry (2nd ed.).
- Stephens, Thomas (1850). Summary of the History of Wales from the Earliest Period to the Present Time. (eisteddfod essay)
- Stephens, Thomas (1853). Remains of the Welsh Poets from the Sixth Century to the Twelfth. (eisteddfod essay)
- Stephens, Thomas (1888) [1853]. Thomas Powel (ed.). English Prose Translation of the "Gododdin" with Explanatory Notes. (originally published as The Gododdin of Aneurin Gwawdrydd: An English Translation with Copious Explanatory Notes; A Life of Aneurin; and Several Lengthy Dissertations Illustrative of the "Gododdin", and the Battle of Cattraeth)
- Stephens, Thomas (1893) [1858]. Madoc: An Essay on the Discovery of America by Madoc ap Owen Gwynedd in the Twelfth Century. (eisteddfod essay)
- Stephens, Thomas; Gweirydd ap Rhys (Robert John Pryse) (1859). Orgraff yr Iaith Gymraeg.
- A series of critical essays, including:
  - Stephens, Thomas. "Edward Williams (Iolo Morganwg) (1852–1853)". Yr Ymofynnydd.
  - Stephens, Thomas (1854). "Dyfnwal Moelmud and Early Welsh Law". Cambrian Journal and Archaeologia Cambrensis.
  - Stephens, Thomas (1858). "The Book of Aberpergwm". Archaeologia Cambrensis.
  - Stephens, Thomas (1872). "The Bardic Alphabet called 'Coelbren y Beirdd'". Archaeologia Cambrensis.
- Numerous shorter articles in newspapers such as The Cambrian, The Merthyr Guardian, The Monmouthshire Merlin, and The Silurian, and in periodicals including Seren Gomer, Yr Ymofynnydd, Y Traethodydd, and Y Beirniad.

(Sources for works: Dictionary of Welsh Biography, National Library of Wales, Stephens, NLW Welsh newspapers)

== External Sources ==
- "The Late Thomas Stephens". 1875.
- "The Late Thomas Stephens of Merthyr". 1875.
- "Thomas Stephens". 1875.
- The Life of Thomas Stephens. 1876.
- A List of the Mss. Essays and Writings of Thomas Stephens. 1876.
- Notable Men of Wales. Thomas Stephens. 1882.
- "Glamorgan". 1905. (Portrait of Stephens once in Cardiff Reference Library)
- "Mr Thos. Stephens. Distinguished Welsh Litterateur. Proposed Memorial". 1908.
- Stephens, Thomas. 1908. (Biography)
- "Welsh Gleanings". 1909. (Connections with Joseph Edwards and Charles Wilkins)
- "Neath Valley's Sylvan Spots". 1913. (Includes Stephens' birthplace)
- "This marble bust by an eminent Welsh sculptor had been left in a cupboard under the stairs at Aberystwyth University". 2016.
- "Marble Bust of prolific Merthyr scholar rediscovered". 2016.
