= Samuel Carter Hall =

Irish-born Victorian journalist

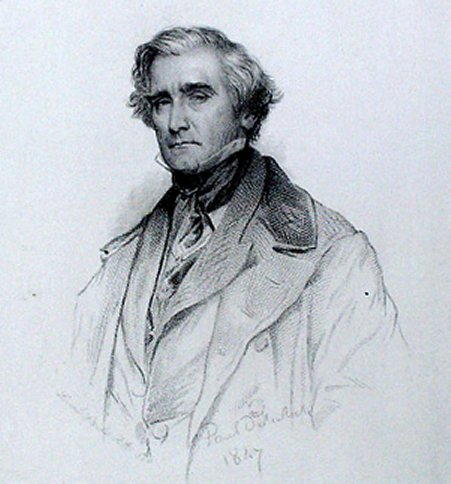
Samuel Carter Hall from a print dated 1847

Samuel Carter Hall (9 May 1800 – 11 March 1889) was an Irish-born Victorian journalist who is best known for his editorship of The Art Journal and for his much-satirised personality.

== Early years ==
Hall was born at the Geneva Barracks in Waterford, Ireland. His London-born father was Robert Hall (1753 – 10 January 1836), an army officer and, while in Ireland, engaged in working copper mines which ruined him. His mother supported the family of 12 children with her own business in Cork. He married Ann Kent (b. 1765, Ottery St. Mary, Devon) at Topsham, 6 April 1790. Hall was the fourth son.

In 1821, he left Ireland and went to London. He entered law studies at the Inner Temple in 1824, but never practised, though he was finally called to the bar in 1841. Instead, he became a reporter and editor, including:

- Reporter, Parliamentary (1823)
- Editor, 'Literary Observer'
- Art reviews/criticism, the British Press (same period)
- Reporter, Representative (1826)
- Reporter, New Times (1826)
- Founder/editor, The Amulet, a Christian and Literary Remembrancer, (annually, 1826–1837)
- Editor, Spirit and Manners of the Age (1826)
- Editor, Morning Journal (1829–30)
- Sub-editor/Editor New Monthly Magazine (1830–1836)'s Juvenile Library
- Author, "History of France", Colburn
- Writer, Watchman, Wesleyan Methodist newspaper, (1835)
- Start-up, The Town, conservative whig journal, (1836)
- Sub-editor, John Bull (1837)
- General manager, Britannia (1839)

Between 1841 and 1843 he and his wife produced a three volume study of Ireland aimed at the English reader, focusing on the pace of social reform and the potential for economic development. It is notable for its description of life in rural Ireland in the year directly preceding the Great Famine.

== Art magazine years ==
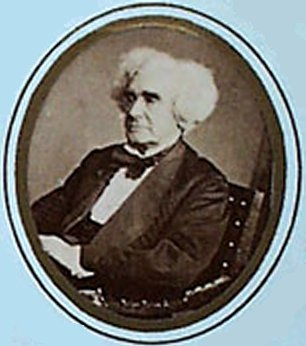
S. C. Hall photographed in 1874

In 1839, Hodgson & Graves, print publishers, employed Hall to edit their new publication, Art Union Monthly Journal. Not long after, Hall purchased a chief share of the periodical. By 1843, he started giving an expensive, unprofitable novelty, sculpture engravings. In 1848, with Hall still unable to turn a profit, the London publisher George Virtue purchased into the Art Union Monthly Journal, retaining Hall as editor. Virtue renamed the periodical The Art Journal in 1849.

In 1851, Hall engraved 150 pictures from the private collection of the Queen and Prince Albert, and the engravings were featured in the journal's Great Exhibition edition. Though this edition was quite popular, the journal remained unprofitable, forcing Hall to sell his share of The Art Journal to Virtue, but staying on as editor.

As editor, Hall exposed the profits that custom-houses were earning by importing Old Masters, and showed how paintings are manufactured in England. While The Art Journal became notable for its honest portrayal of fine arts, the consequence of Hall's actions was the almost unsaleability of old masters such as a Raphael or a Titian. His intention was to support modern British art by promoting young artists and attacking the market for unreliable old masters. The early issues of the Journal strongly supported the artists of The Clique and attacked the Pre-Raphaelites. Hall remained deeply unsympathetic to Pre-Raphaeliism, publishing several attacks upon the movement. Hall resigned the editorship in 1880, and was granted a Civil List pension for his long and valuable services to literature and art.

== Personal life ==
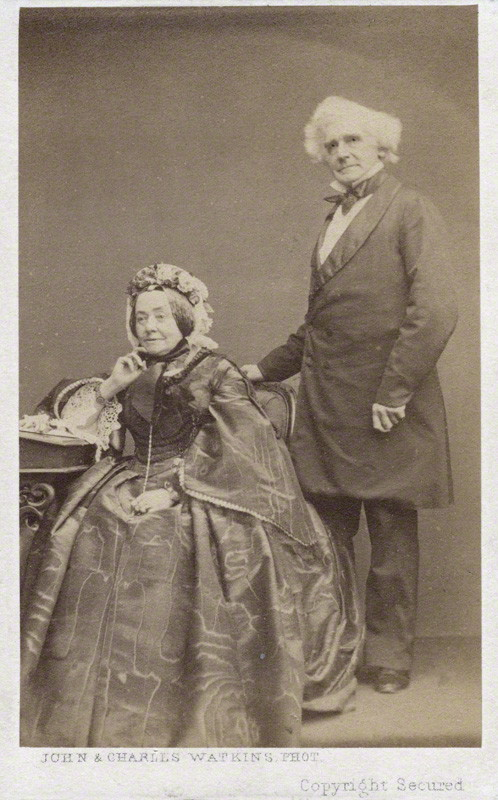
Anna Maria Hall and Samuel Carter Hall

His wife, Anna Maria Fielding (1800–1881), became well known (publishing as "Mrs S.C. Hall"), for her numerous articles, novels, sketches of Irish life, and plays. Two of the last, The Groves of Blarney and The French Refugee, were produced in London with success. She also wrote a number of children's books, and was practically interested in various London charities, several of which she helped to found.

Hall's notoriously sanctimonious personality was often satirised, and he is regularly cited as the model for the character of Pecksniff in Charles Dickens's novel Martin Chuzzlewit. As Julian Hawthorne wrote,

Hall was a genuine comedy figure. Such oily and voluble sanctimoniousness needed no modification to be fitted to appear before the footlights in satirical drama. He might be called an ingenuous hypocrite, an artless humbug, a veracious liar, so obviously were the traits indicated innate and organic in him rather than acquired. Dickens, after all, missed some of the finer shades of the character; there can be little doubt that Hall was in his own private contemplation as shining an object of moral perfection as he portrayed himself before others. His perversity was of the spirit, not of the letter, and thus escaped his own recognition. His indecency and falsehood were in his soul, but not in his consciousness; so that he paraded them at the very moment that he was claiming for himself all that was their opposite.

Hall was a convinced spiritualist. He was the chairman for the British National Association of Spiritualists, in 1874.

== Bibliography ==
- The Amulet: A Christian and Literary Remembrancer (1833)
- Ireland: Its Scenery, Character and History (Three Volumes, published between 1841 and 1843)
- Gems of the Modern Poets: With Biographical Notices (1842)
- The Book of British Ballads (1842)
- The Gallery of Modern Sculpture (1849–54)
- The royal gallery of art, ancient and modern: engravings from the private collections of Her Majesty the Queen and His Royal Highness Prince Albert, and the art heir-looms of the crown, at Windsor Castle, Buckingham Palace, and Osborne, (Editor) [1854?].
- The Vernon Gallery of British Art, London, 1854
- Memoirs of Great Men and Women of the Age, From Personal Acquaintance (1871)
- Haddon Hall. An Illustrated Guide illustrated by Llewellynn Jewitt (1871)
- The Trial of Sir Jasper: A Temperance Tale in Verse (1873)
- An Old Story: A Temperance Tale in Verse (1875)
- A Memoir of Thomas Moore (1879)
- Rhymes in Council: Aphorisms Versified (1881)
- Retrospect of a Long Life, from 1815 to 1883 (1883)
- The Use of Spiritualism? (1884)
