= James Sprent Virtue =

British publisher (1829–1892)

James Sprent Virtue (18 May 1829 – 29 March 1892) was a British publisher.

== Early years ==
Born at 26 Ivy Lane, Paternoster Row, in the City of London, EC, J. S. Virtue was the second son of George Virtue, the founder in London of a publishing business, the main feature of which was producing illustrated works.

At the age of fourteen, J.S. was apprenticed to his father, and in 1848, when he was 19, he was sent to work in the firm’s New York publishing branch, to expand the United States and Canadian market for its books and journals. He travelled widely through the United States and Canada on business, He returned to England in 1850, when he was admitted as a liveryman of the Stationers' Company. He then went back to the New York City branch and became its head. By 1852, Virtue had expanded the firm’s North American business to fifteen local branches in the major cities of the eastern United States and Canada. J.S. returned to England in 1855, when his father retired from active business, and succeeded him as head of the Virtue company.

== Mid career ==
As proprietor of The Art Journal, J.S. embarked upon the illustrations of the great galleries: the Royal, the Sheepshanks, the Vernon, and the Turner, making it famous. Among other works published by the firm were illustrated editions of the Holy Bible, 1861–5, three volumes, and Tomlinson's Cyclopaedia of Useful Arts, 1854.

In 1862, in conjunction with his older brother, George Henry Virtue FSA he organised another business at 1 Amen Corner, under the name of Virtue Brothers & Company. In 1865, his younger brother, William Alexander Virtue, became a partner in the family's City Road and Ivy Lane businesses. The brothers were also proprietors of Arthur Hall, Virtue & Co. which published all four of William H. Bartlett's Guelph collection books.

J.S. sold some of the business after George Henry's death on July 21, 1866. William went to the United States and took over leadership of the family's American branch, until his death in 1875. His sister, Frances, was married to the British essayist and historian James Augustus Cotter Morison.

J.S. married Miss J. E. Shirreff in 1867. About this time, he began publishing St Paul's Magazine, but sold it around 1869.

By 1879 J.S. was living in Oatlands Park and sent for sale the many artworks, mostly paintings, that had been acquired for reproduction in The Art Journal. In 1871, Samuel Spalding was admitted a partner in the business at 26 Ivy Lane, 294 City Road, and 31 Farringdon Street, and in 1874 Frederic Richard Daldy, of the firm of Bell & Daldy, was also taken into the house. The business was conducted much upon the old lines, new and improved editions of illustrated works being issued, including Charles Knight's Shakespeare (1871), and Picturesque Palestine (1880).

== Publishing houses ==
- James S. Virtue
- J.S. Virtue & Co Ltd
- Virtue & Co.
- Virtue Brothers & Co.
- Virtue, Emmins & Co
- Virtue, Spalding
- Virtue, Spalding, and Daldy
- Virtue & (John C.) Yorston

== Later years ==
J.S. was one of the founders of the London Rowing Club, and for many years took an active part in the management. For several seasons he gave an annual prize of a sculling boat to be competed for by the scullers. He died at 3 Prince's Mansions, Victoria Street, London, on 29 March 1892, and was buried at Walton-on-Thames on 2 April.
