= Walton-on-Thames Cemetery =

Cemetery in Surrey, England

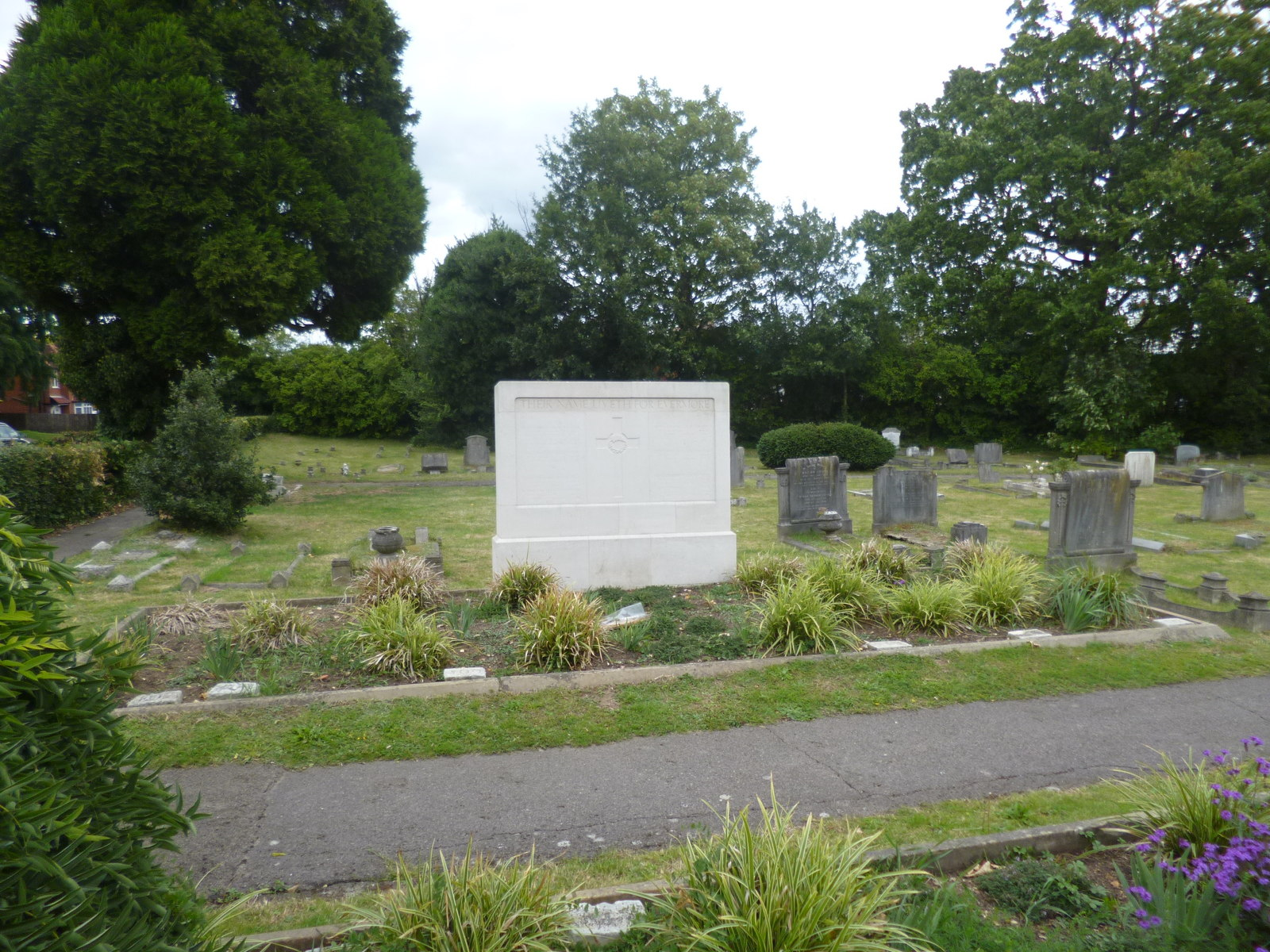
- Selection of planting, graves and the New Zealand War Memorial

Details
- Location: Walton-on-Thames, Borough of Elmbridge, Surrey
- Country: England
- Coordinates: 51.3877°N 0.4172°W
- Type: Active
- Style: Laid to lawn, with low front wall, flowers and shrubberies
- Owned by: Elmbridge Borough Council
- Size: 5,700 square metres (1.4 acres)
- No. of interments: 229
- Website: https://www.elmbridge.gov.uk/cemeteries-services/information/
- Find a Grave: Walton-on-Thames Cemetery

Walton-on-Thames Cemetery is the municipal part of Walton-on-Thames's main cemeteries next to the (Anglican) parish church and facing the Methodist Church.

Among the 229 graves are 33 for casualties from World War I and World War II. Near the entrance is a memorial wall listing 19 men who served with the New Zealand Expeditionary Force in the former. Some or all of these were patients at the No. 2 New Zealand General Hospital nearby.

== Notable burials ==
- George Virtue (1794–1868); 19th-century London publisher, notably of engravings; has a surmounting sculpture by Joseph Edwards.
- Fred Atkins (1859–1881); police constable whose murder on Kingston Hill remains unsolved.

== Gallery ==
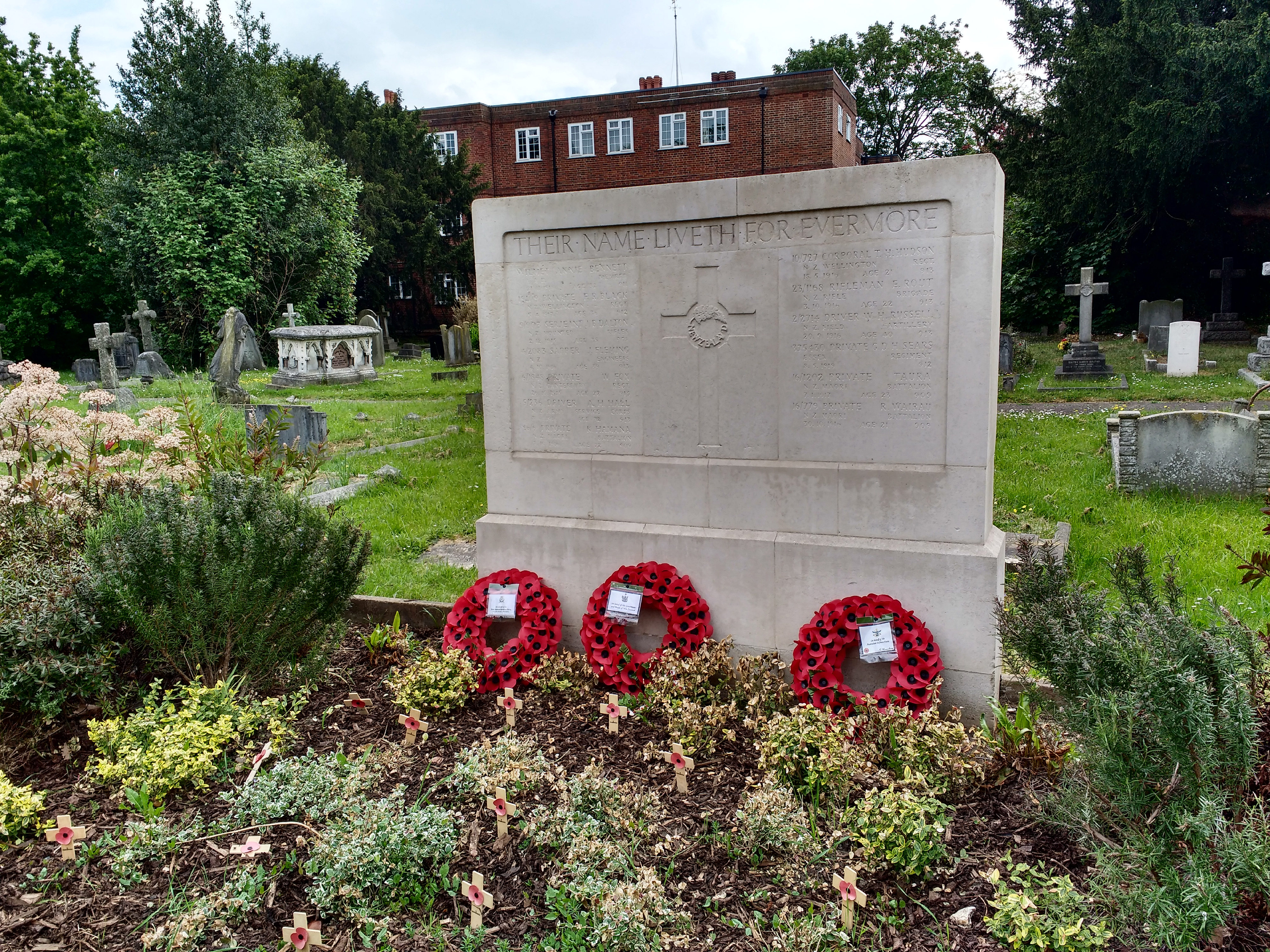
ANZAC memorial

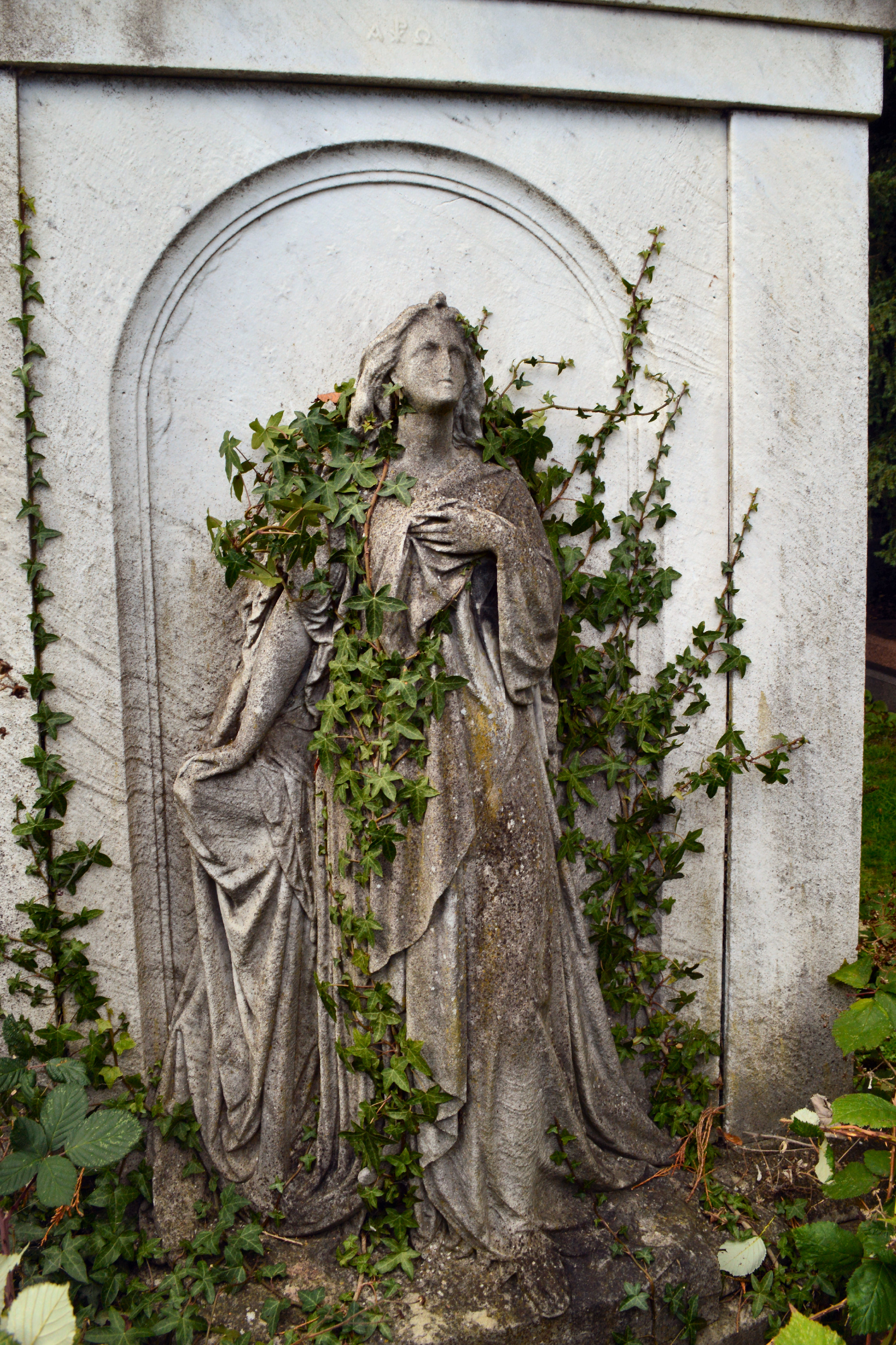
George Virtue grave
