= Richard Austin Artlett =

British artist (1807–1873)

Richard Austin Artlett (9 November 1807 – 1 September 1873) was a British engraver and painter. He was a pupil of Robert Cooper, and then of James Thomson.

== Works ==
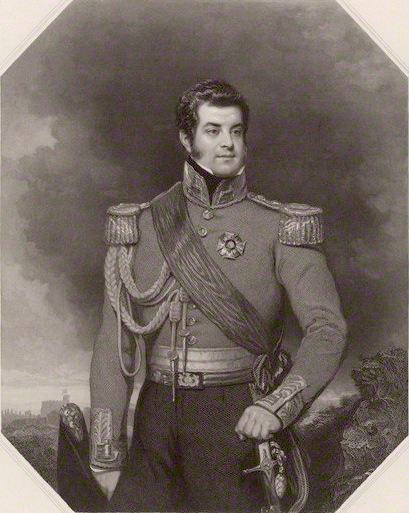
George FitzClarence, 1st Earl of Munster, 1839 engraving by Artlett

Artlett engraved in the dotted manner. He carried out some figure-subjects, including Boulogne in 1805 and Boulogne in 1855, after John Absolon. Among his portraits were those of Lord Ashburton, after Sir Thomas Lawrence; Lord Lyndhurst, after Alfred Edward Chalon; the Right Hon. Henry Goulburn and Sir James Emerson Tennent, after George Richmond; George MacDonald, after George Reid; Lady Clementina Villiers, after Franz Xaver Winterhalter; and Mrs. Gladstone, after William Say.

Artlett was best known as an engraver of sculpture, in particular for plates in The Art Journal. Among them were:

- The Fawn, a statue by C. B. Birch;
- The Virgin Mother, a group by Albert-Ernest Carrier-Belleuse;
- The Leopard-Hunter, a statue by Jens Adolf Jerichau;
- The Day-Dream, a statue by Patrick MacDowell;
- The Veiled Vestal, a statue by Raffaelle Monti;
- Boadicea, a group by John Thomas;
- the equestrian statue of Viscount Hardinge, and Asia, one of the groups of the Albert Memorial, by John Henry Foley;
- Christ giving sight to the Blind Man, a group by John Denton Crittenden; and
- Perdita and Florizel and The Siren and the drowned Leander, groups by Joseph Durham.
