= Kingston Hill Murder =

1881 murder in England

The Kingston Hill Murder was the case of Police Constable 356 V Fred Atkins, who was murdered on Kingston Hill, Kingston, Surrey, in 1881.

The murder remains unsolved. The magazine Punch published a cartoon entitled "An Unequal Match" that October highlighting the dangers facing unarmed police. The case was instrumental in bringing about the arming of police officers, although it required a second fatal shooting, that of P.C. George Cole by a burglar, in 1882, and the attempted murder of P.C. Patrick Boans in 1883, before the authorities gave superintendents permission to arm their constables for night duty.

Fred Atkins was born in Walton-on-Thames in 1859, the son of a greengrocer, and joined the police on 14 May 1877; 356 Division V (Wandsworth). In 1881 he was lodging with John Pearmain, Inspector Of Police, and his family at the Police Station, Richmond, which was at 35 George Street until 1912. He was transferred from Richmond to Kingston on 15 August.

== The murder ==
On the night of 21 September he was on duty in Kingston Hill, which was not his usual beat. The usual policemen for that beat, PC Andrew Cavanagh, was absent that evening and Atkins was appointed in his place.

The shooting took place in the grounds of The Knoll, a large house with extensive grounds along Kingston Hill next to Richmond Park and opposite Coombe Warren, in the early morning of Thursday, 22 September 1881. The house was owned by Harry Powys-Keck, a Justice Of The Peace of Stoughton Grange, Leicestershire. In that period police officers would check the security of larger residential houses by special request, especially as there had been a series of burglaries in the region; Woodlands, the residence of Miss Finch, which adjoins Mr. Powys Keck's grounds, was broken into on the Tuesday.

=== The shooting ===
P.C. Atkins had been in the grounds since at least 1am when he had met one of the gardeners, who had then returned to the lodge and neither he or two grooms in the stables heard the shots. The butler, Mr W Short, was woken at about 1:15am by the sound of crashing and with the housekeeper, Mrs H Snow, who had heard three shots, proceeded to search the house, and found it secure. Mrs Snow told Mr J Bloomfield, the valet, that she had heard moaning. They opened the front door and found the constable lying on the ground. They did not immediately know that he was shot, thinking him in a fit, and placed him on a mat outside and offering him water. Mr Short then sent men running to Kingston Police Station arriving about two o'clock. It was only when they had undone his overcoat that they found that he was wounded.

First to the scene on his horse was Inspector Rushbridge, closely followed by Inspector Crowther with other constables and the ambulance litter. They then sent for Dr. W.H. Roots, the Divisional police surgeon. Atkins could not be taken to the nearest hospital at Surbiton because of his serious condition. Instead he was taken to Kingston Police Station where he was examined by Dr Roots. PC Atkins had been wounded in three places, the abdomen, chest and left thigh. The bullet to the chest had penetrated the lungs; the bullet remained in his back. A second bullet was found at the scene while the third was found in his clothing at the station.

Constable Atkins did not die immediately, and before his death was able to tell colleagues that he neither saw nor heard anything before the shots. "I did not see anybody or hear anything which should me to imagine there were burglars at work. I went along the avenue slowly, accordingly to my usual custom when on duty there, but there was no-one about. Before I was aware of anything I saw something like the gleam of a lantern, and then whispers, after which there was a report, and then I felt I was struck by something sharp in the chest. I turned to one side quickly, when another shot was fired, and that’s all I can remember."

Inspector Bond, with colleagues Crowther and Rushbridge, examined the grounds of The Knoll. They found that burglars had removed a protective iron bar from a ground floor lavatory window, beneath which in the bushes lay a bull's eye lantern in good condition and a large screwdriver made of an old blacksmith's rasp, taken out of the wooden handle, the top being bound round with a piece of blue check Oxford shirting. The steel had the name of the maker, "W.Peach," and on the flat the initials "F. B." Footprints were found that led towards Richmond Park.

The murder was committed with a breach-loading, central-fire, six-shot revolver, '450 bore, and Boxer cartridges. The hammer has three cocks—the safety cock, the half-cock, and the full cock.

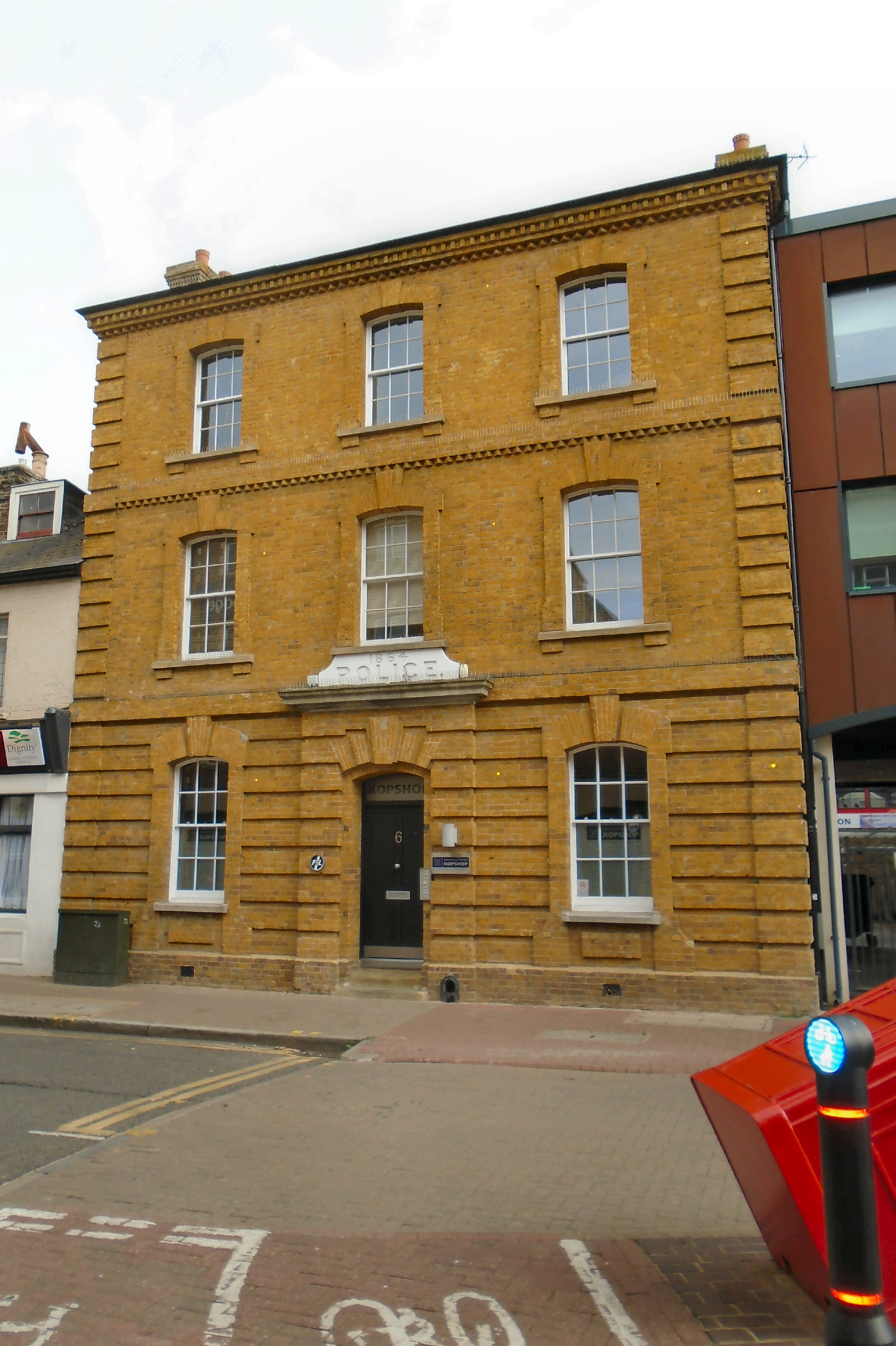
Old Police station, London Road

The officers in charge of the case are of opinion that the work is that of one man — not local, and probably coming from London, where he is now supposed to be waiting for the excitement in connection with the case to subside. The chisel found is of an extremely rude description, and is believed to have been converted into its present shape at a blacksmith's forge. From this it is inferred that the initials on the handle are those of its possessor and not of its maker. The lantern is of the bull's-eye pattern, and presents no strange features beyond being of a rather better kind than that used by most burglars, while the bullets recovered are of a conical shape, and so large as to warrant the belief that the revolver or pistol used was of American manufacture. As might be expected, the local gunmakers are unable to furnish any clue, but state positively that neither weapon nor ammunition was purchased in the district.

P.C. Atkins died at halfpast one o'clock on Friday, 23 September, at Kingston Police Station.

The Government offered a reward of £100 (equivalent to £10,513 in 2025) for any information leading to the discovery of the murderer and a free pardon to any accomplice. The reward was made up to £200 by donations. The relations of Constable Atkins were entitled to £50 on account of his unexpected death.

=== The suspect ===
Local blacksmith and farrier, Frank Brockwell, was arrested and questioned for seven hours. His boots were found to match the footprints in the grounds of the Knoll. The police were forced to release him for lack of evidence.

== The inquest ==
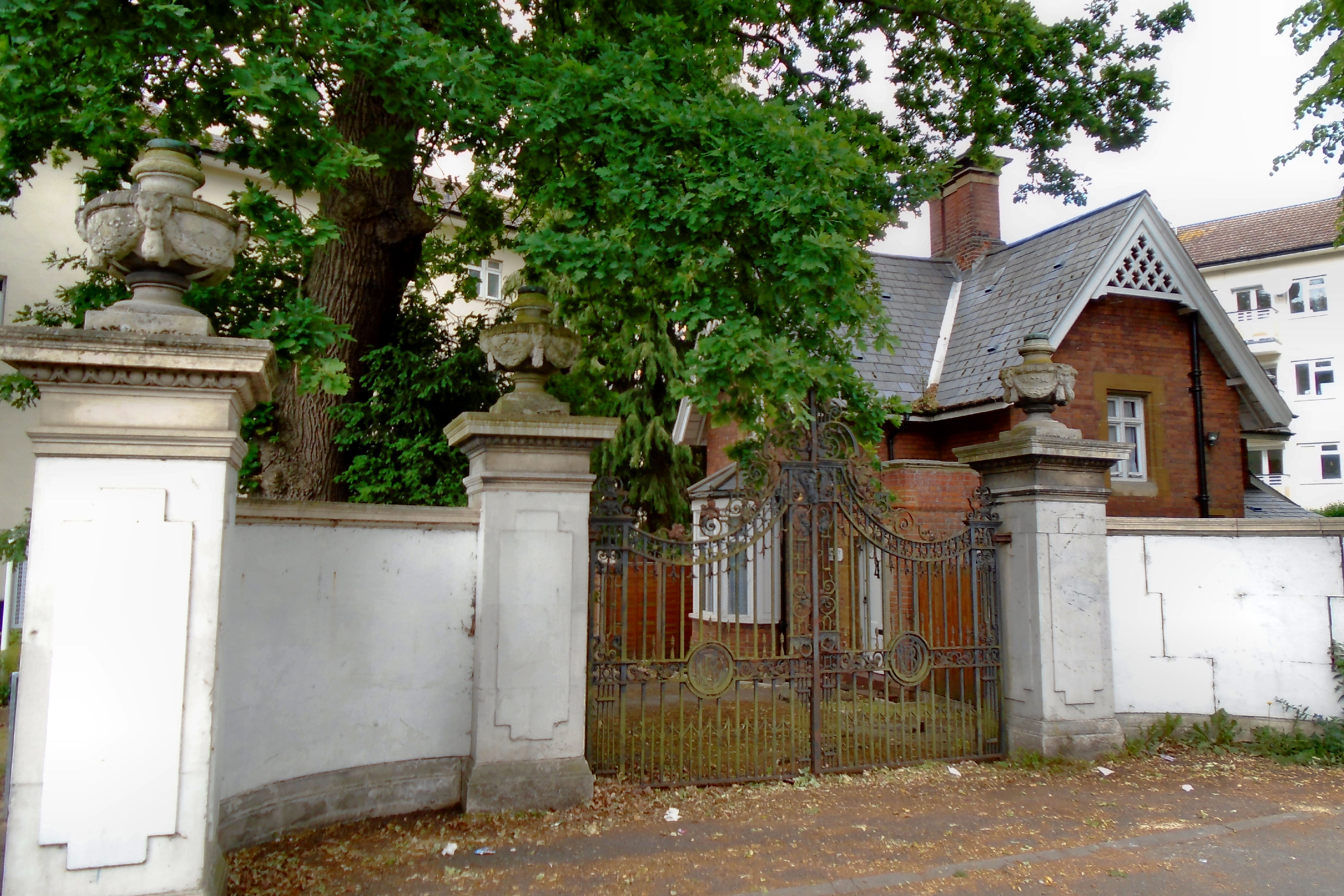
South Lodge and the entrance on Kingston Hill

The inquest was carried out at the Clarence Arms, Kingston, on Saturday 24th by Mr. Hall, the Coroner for Mid-Surrey, and concluded on 3 October, the jury giving a verdict that he was wilfully murdered by some person or persons unknown.

The lodge at the "Knoll" is occupied by William Brown, the gardener, and is situated about 200 yards from the house. About 20 Minutes past 1 o'clock on Thursday morning Brown was awakened from his sleep by the opening of the gate, and from his window he saw the Flashing of a light from a bull's eye lantern, which he believed was carried by Police-constable Atkins, a voice at the same time calling out "All right." The officer proceeded in the direction of the house, and Brown remained undisturbed till about 20 minutes to 2 o'clock, when he was called up and informed that a policeman had been shot. He then hastened to the front of the house, where he found William Short, the butler, and Bloomfield, the valet, standing near the policemen, who was lying on the ground, close to the recess on the right of the entrance near the small window by which the burglars had tried to enter the mansion. That the officer was totally unaware of his proximity to his assailants is manifest from the replies which be gave to the interrogatories put to him before he died at the police station. His answers were taken down in writing and were as follows :—" I saw no one," I heard no voice," "I was coming to the house when fired at," "I saw no one about on my beat," " I heard no one run away." A sketch of the entrance to the mansion and the flight of steps leading up to the door, with the angle, recess, and by window, has been made for the authorities. The recess, in which the murder was committed, is only a few feet deep. It forms a sort of cul de sac, and there is little doubt that the robbers, startled by the footsteps of the constable and fearing that they were caught in a trap, made a dash to escape, firing quickly as they rushed out of the recess to the walk, and almost brushing against the officer as they crossed his path.

== The funeral ==
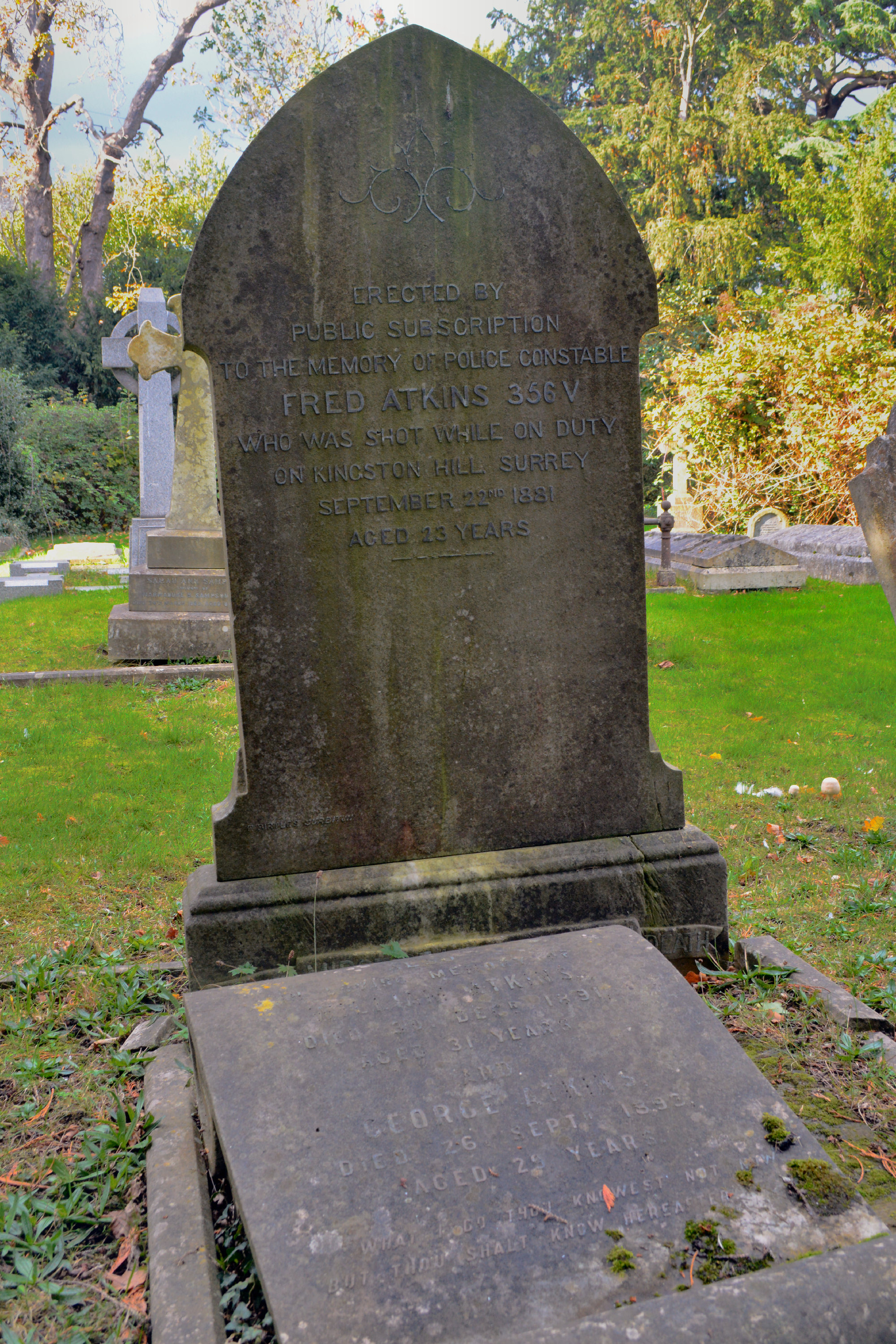
Grave in Walton

The funeral took place on Thursday 30 September at Walton-on-Thames municipal cemetery. The headstone was raised by subscription from the Metropolitan Police and general public and was of Sicilian marble.

About 2,000 of the metropolitan police, representing every division, attended the funeral on the 29 September, travelling on a special train from Waterloo to Walton-on-Thames. Also attending were his parents and family and also servants from the Knoll.

THE MURDER OF A POLICE CONSTABLE
The funeral of Police-constable Atkins, who was shot by burglars at Kingston last week, took place in the parish churchyard, Walton, on Thursday. Crowds of spectators flocked into the place, and nearly all the shops had shutters up. Altogether, there could not have been far short of 2,000 police constables present. All who could be spared from Richmond, headed by Inspectors Aldridge and Fairey (Inspector Pearman being on the sick list) together with the members of the Volunteer Fire Brigade (with their captain, Mr. T. Covell) and some other visitors, were conveyed to Walton in two omnibuses and a break, which left Richmond soon after twelve o'clock, the Barnes contingent, under Inspector Harbor, having preceded them about half an hour. There were also about twenty-five constables from Brentford and fifteen from Chiswick. At Walton the police were drawn up two deep, and lined the route on both sides of the road from the High-street to the parish church, a distance of some 300 yards. The remains of the deceased lay at the residence of his father, in the High-street, and it was from there that the funeral cortege started. The funeral had been announced for a quarter-past two, and shortly after that time the well-known and solemn strains of the "Dead March” conveyed to the thousands of spectators who thronged the road an intimation that the impressive ceremony had commenced. At the head of the procession rode Superintendent Digby, of the V division, to which the deceased belonged, followed by an advance party of fifty of Atkins' more immediate comrades, who are attached to the stations at Richmond and Kingston. Next in order came the band of the V division, immediately succeeded by the coffin containing all that was mortal of the unfortunate constable. This was borne by six of his intimate acquaintances in the force during life, while the pall, which was literally covered with wreaths of beautiful white blossoms, including a very handsome one from Richmond, was supported by eight bearers. Behind walked the parents and the seven brothers and sisters of the deceased, and a numerous train of mourners, including several members of the household at The Knoll, near were the murder was perpetrated. The rear of the procession was brought up by the men belonging to the Walton, Wimbledon, Richmond, and Kingston and Surbiton Fire Brigades, all of whom appeared in uniform, and the members of the local lodges of Oddfellows and Foresters wearing mourning badges. It may be mentioned that the deceased was a member of the former society. The funeral cortege pursued its way from the house to the church amidst an impressive silence, broken only by the strains the "Dead March" that proceeded from the band. At the entrance to the churchyard the procession was met by the Rev. T. J. M’Cowan, the vicar of the parish, by whom the service was conducted. The coffin was conveyed to the interior of the church, where the preliminaries were gone through and from thence it was taken to the graveside. Here the Vicar read the burial service, at the conclusion of which Mrs and Miss Digby stepped forward and placed two splendid wreaths upon the coffin lid. Wreaths were also placed there on behalf of the E and P divisions, and by various friends of the deceased, and then the last sad rite was performed, and the coffin lowered slowly into its resting place. The coffin was of polished elm, and on it was the simple inscription, "Fred. Atkins, died September 23rd, 1881, aged 23." At the conclusion of the service an address was read over the grave by a member of the lodge of Oddfellows, while a friend of the deceased delivered a funeral oration with impressive emphasis, in the course of which he bore testimony to his many good qualities, and pointed out that he died in the performance of his duties. Superintendent Fisher, of the T division, and a large number of inspectors were present at the service. The arrangements were admirably carried out by Superintendent Digby, at what proved to be the largest police demonstration of the kind that has occurred for many years. Subsequently, the men returned to their several destinations by special trains.

== Memorials ==
There is a memorial to him erected in 1996 outside Kingston Police Station. There is a small memorial garden beside the old police station, now the Watchman pub, in New Malden.

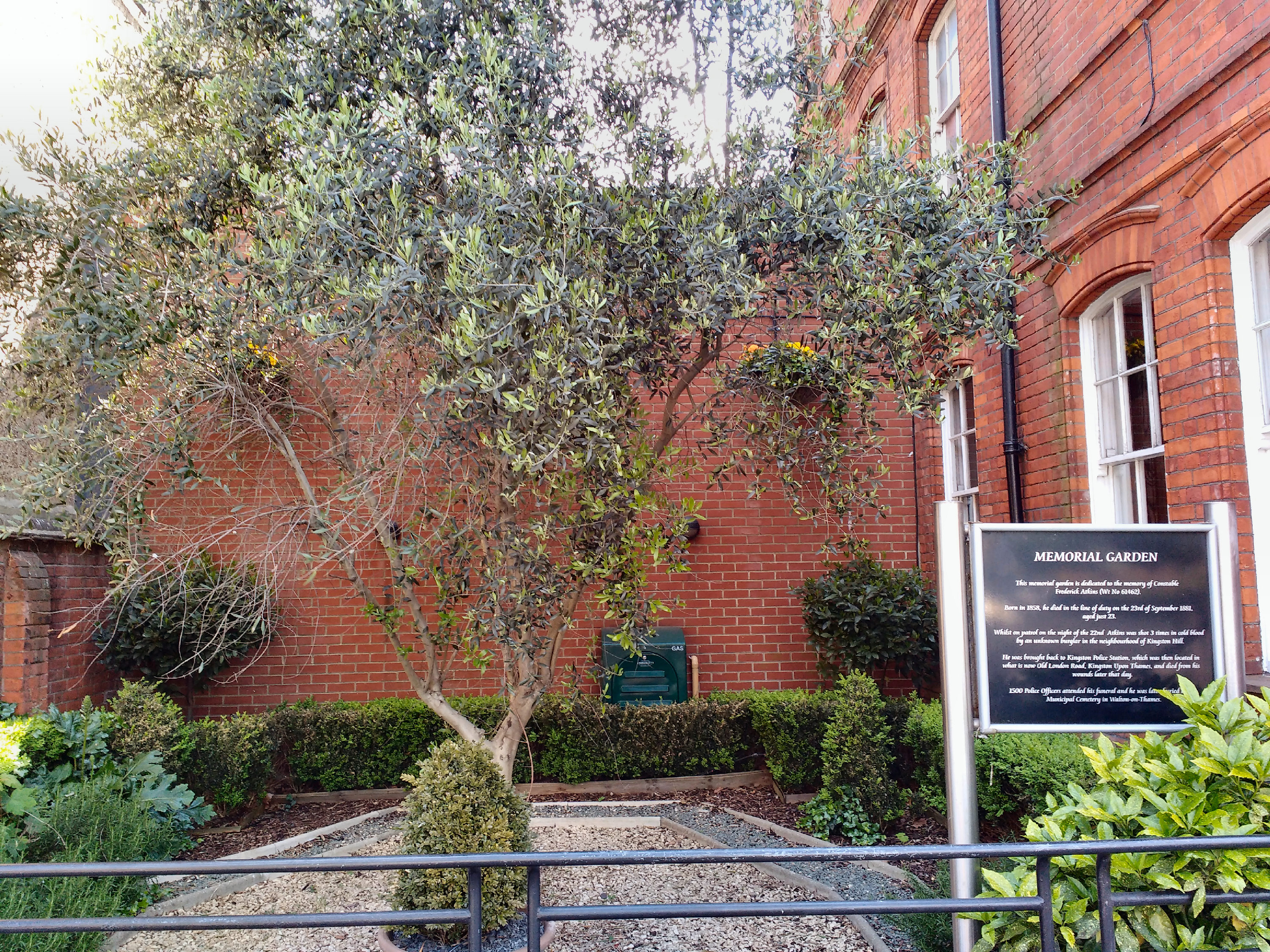
New Malden memorial

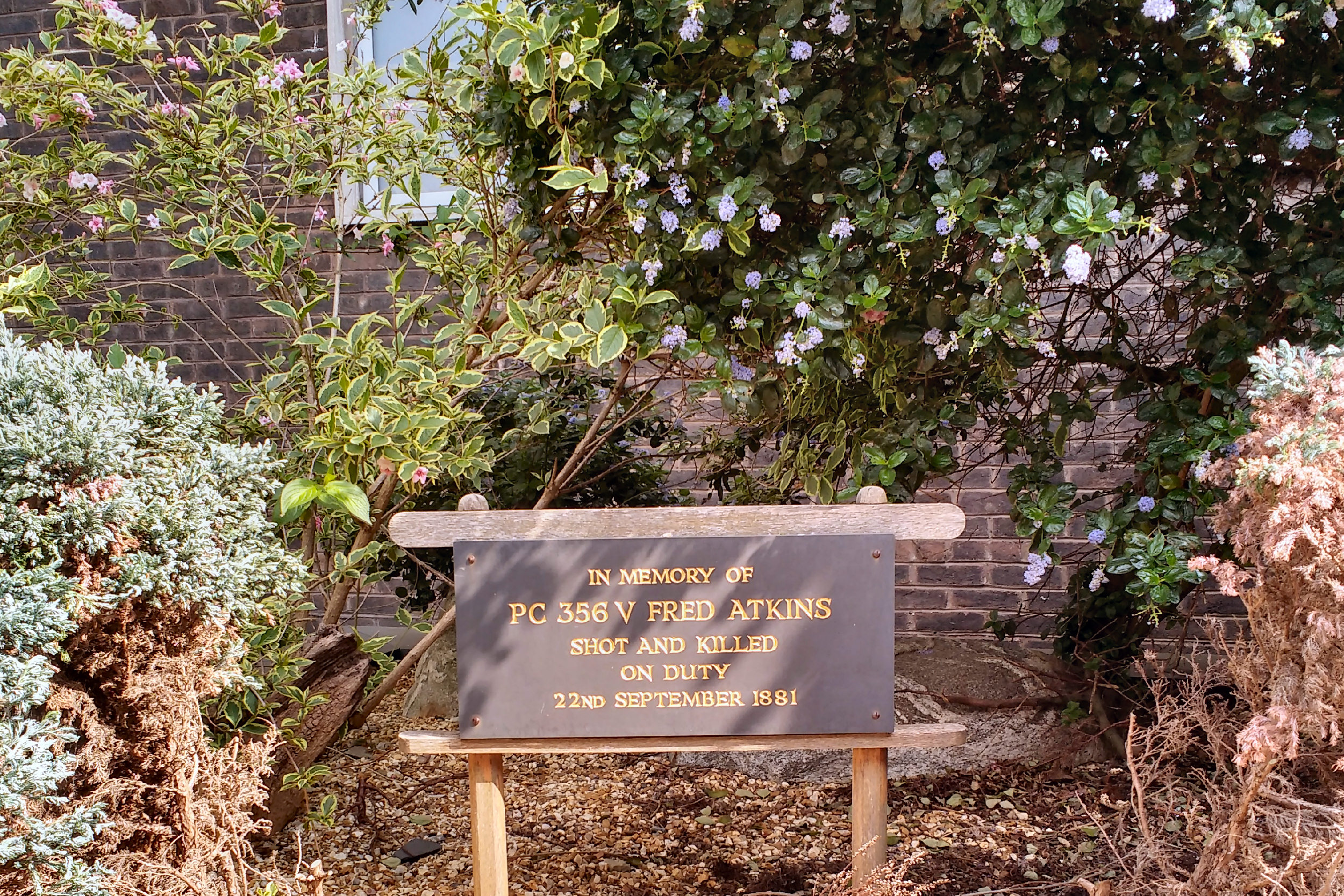
Kingston memorial

Powys-Keck died at the Knoll in 1912; it was sold in 1913, advertised as having 18 acres of grounds with two lodges, forming a miniature park containing its own dairy, kitchen garden and stabling for four horses. In 1914 it was reported that a large new residence was being built, later called Hay Green, for Mr Crowther, "one of the grandest stately homes that once graced Kingston." In 1927 the house was renamed Kingsnympton Hall by Mr F.N. Picket, and later owned by Sir Maneckji B. Dadabhoy of Nagpur, an Indian industrialist and politician, whose initials "MBD" are on the gates by the lodge. The house was demolished in 1940 after bomb damage.
