= Joseph Edwards (sculptor) =

Welsh sculptor (1814–1882)

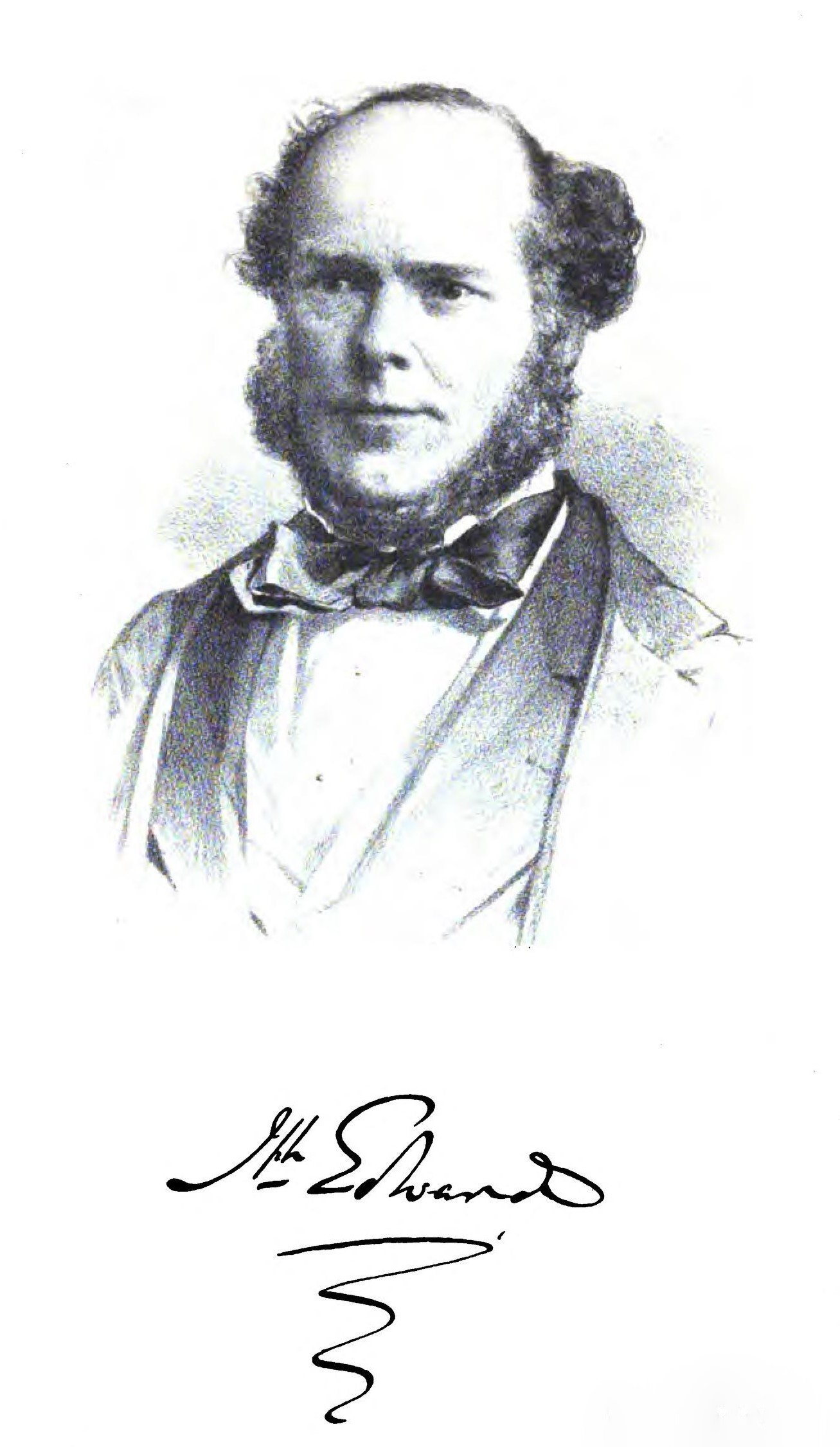
- Born: 5 March 1814; Merthyr Tydfil, Glamorganshire, Wales
- Died: 9 January 1882 (aged 67); London, England
- Resting place: Highgate Cemetery
- Known for: Sculpture

Joseph Edwards (5 March 1814 – 9 January 1882) was a Welsh sculptor. His work appears in many churches and cemeteries in England and Wales, in Westminster Abbey, and in the old town hall of Merthyr Tydfil. Seventy of his works were exhibited at the Royal Academy of Arts between 1838 and 1878.

== Background ==
Joseph Edwards was born on 5 March 1814 in Merthyr Tydfil, Glamorganshire, Wales, the son of a stonemason, and went to school in Merthyr. At the age of seventeen he saw the collection of stone Celtic crosses at Margam Abbey and decided to become a sculptor. Apprenticed to a memorial mason in Swansea, he was quickly promoted to foreman. In 1835, he went to London where he began working for William Behnes.

== Sculpture ==
In 1837, Edwards became a student at the Royal Academy of Arts where he won several prizes for his work. His early works include a memorial to Sir John Bernard Bosanquet. Another memorial monument, entitled "Religion", was shown at an international exhibition in 1862. A version of this monument appears on the grave of Eliza Vaughan in Highgate (Western) Cemetery, London. Edward's work can be seen in churches throughout England and Wales. He made busts of many contemporary figures including Taliesin ap Iolo, Thomas Stephens (c. 1871), G. T. Clark, William Williams (M.P. for Coventry), Edith Wynne, and George Virtue, and members of the Beaufort, Guest, Raglan, and Crawshay families.

Commenting on Edwards' bust of Thomas Stephens, The Art Journal said, "[The Welsh] may well be proud of their countryman, Joseph Edwards. There are artists who will make as good busts, but there is no living sculptor who can produce monumental work so pure, so refined, so essentially holy."

By 1881 he seems to have fallen on hard times as he was living as a lodger in Robert Street, west of Euston Station and that year, sponsored by George Frederic Watts, Edwards was awarded a pension under the Turner Bequest, but he died shortly after receiving it.

== Death ==
Edwards died on 9 January 1882 in London and was buried in Highgate Cemetery.

== Works ==
- The Last Dream (1851)
- Daughter of the Dawn (1851)
- Medallion of a lady (1851)
- Religion Consoling Justice, (memorial to Sir John Bernard Bosanquet at Dingestow Church, Monmouthshire)
- Memorial monument Religion (1862, Cefn cemetery near Merthyr; replica at Highgate cemetery)
- The Vision
- The Weary Reassured
- Self Knowledge
- The High Priest of Science
- Hope
- The Adoration of the Spirit Ascending
- Philosophy
- Grave of George Virtue (1870)
- The Spirit of Love and Truth
- Monuments in many churches and cemeteries in Wales, Westminster Abbey, Merthyr Tydfil old town hall
- Busts of members of the Beaufort, Guest, Raglan, and Crawshay families
- Busts of well-known Welsh people including Taliesin ap Iolo, Thomas Stephens (c. 1871), G. T. Clark, William Williams (M.P. for Coventry), Edith Wynne, and George Virtue
- The Cymmrodorion Medal (1880)
- Medallion of J. Ewing Ritchie, Esq.
- Monument to William Hawkins and Mary, his Wife
- Figure of "Religion" on the grave of Mrs Vaughn in Highgate Cemetery (1866)

Seventy of Edwards' works were exhibited at the Royal Academy of Arts from 1838 to 1878.

(Sources: Ellis, University of Glasgow, The Cardiff Times)

== Gallery ==
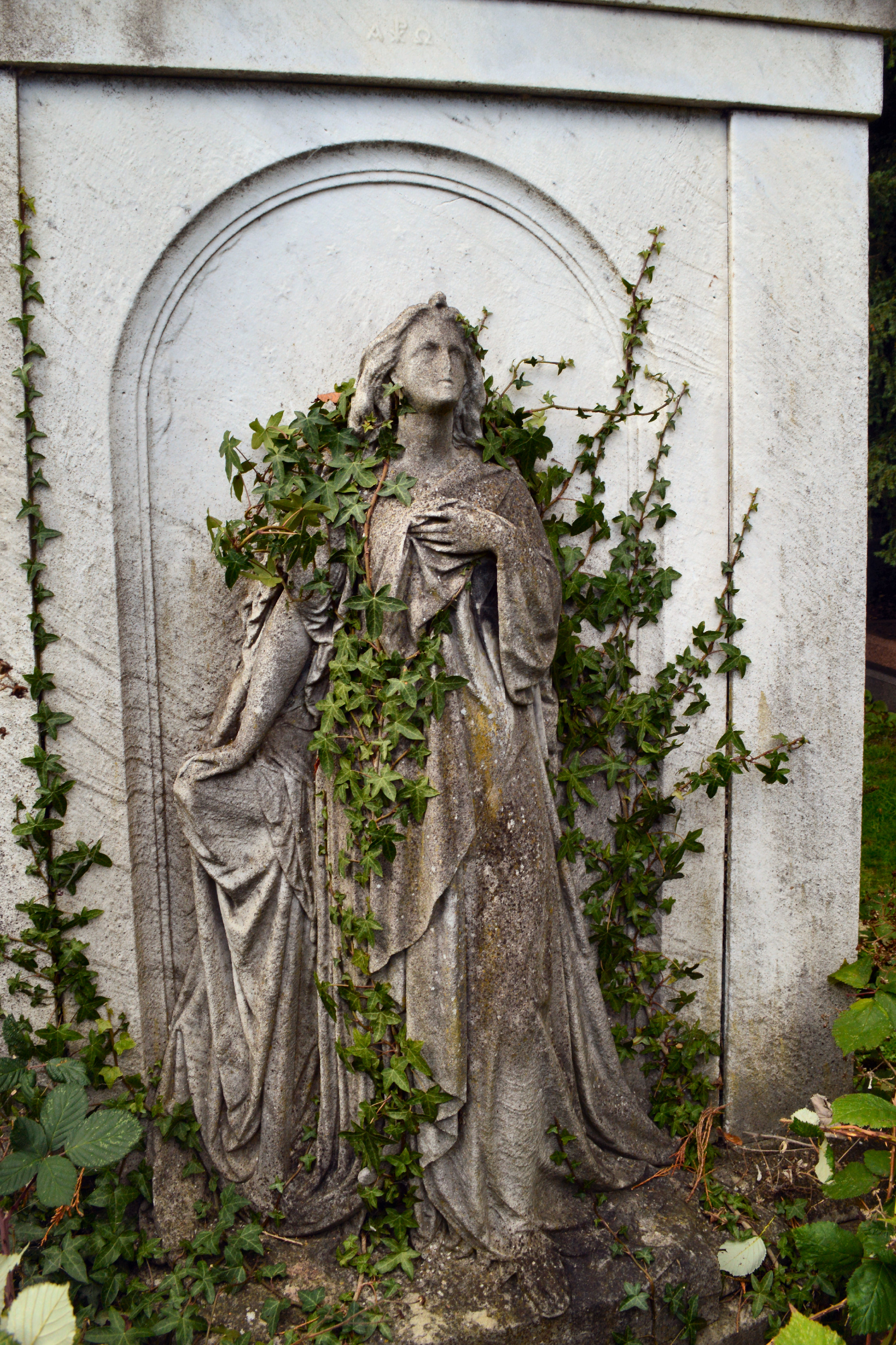
Grave of George Virtue (1870), Walton-on-Thames

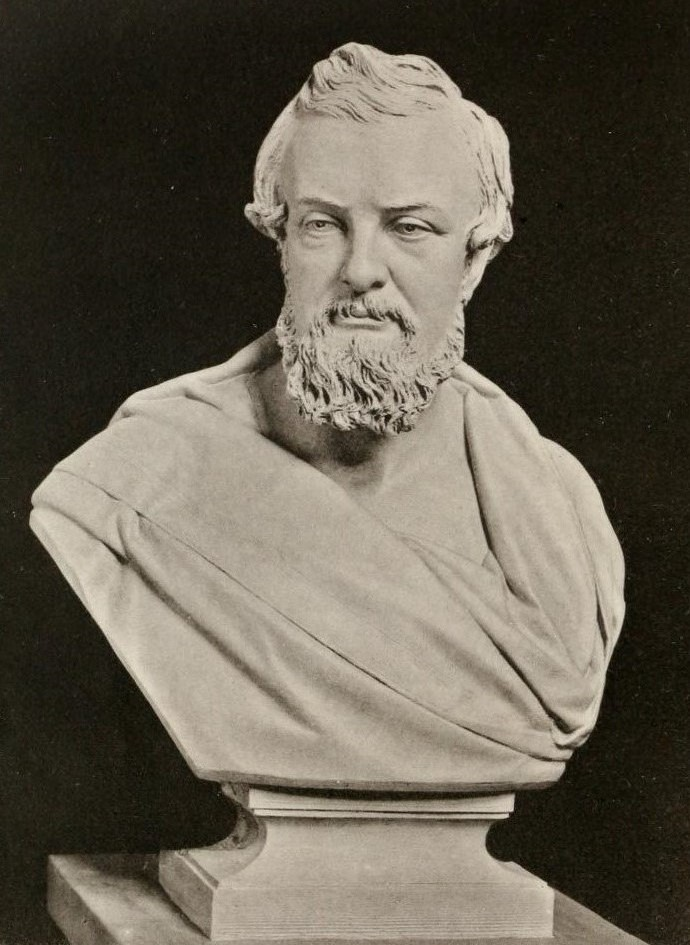
Bust of Welsh historian, literary critic and social reformer Thomas Stephens (1821–1875), c. 1871 by Joseph Edwards; presented to Stephens as a testimonial after 25 years as honorary secretary of the Merthyr Library

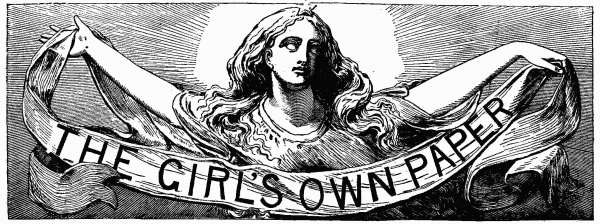
1886 masthead illustration of The Girl's Own Paper, based on The Spirit of Love and Truth by Edwards

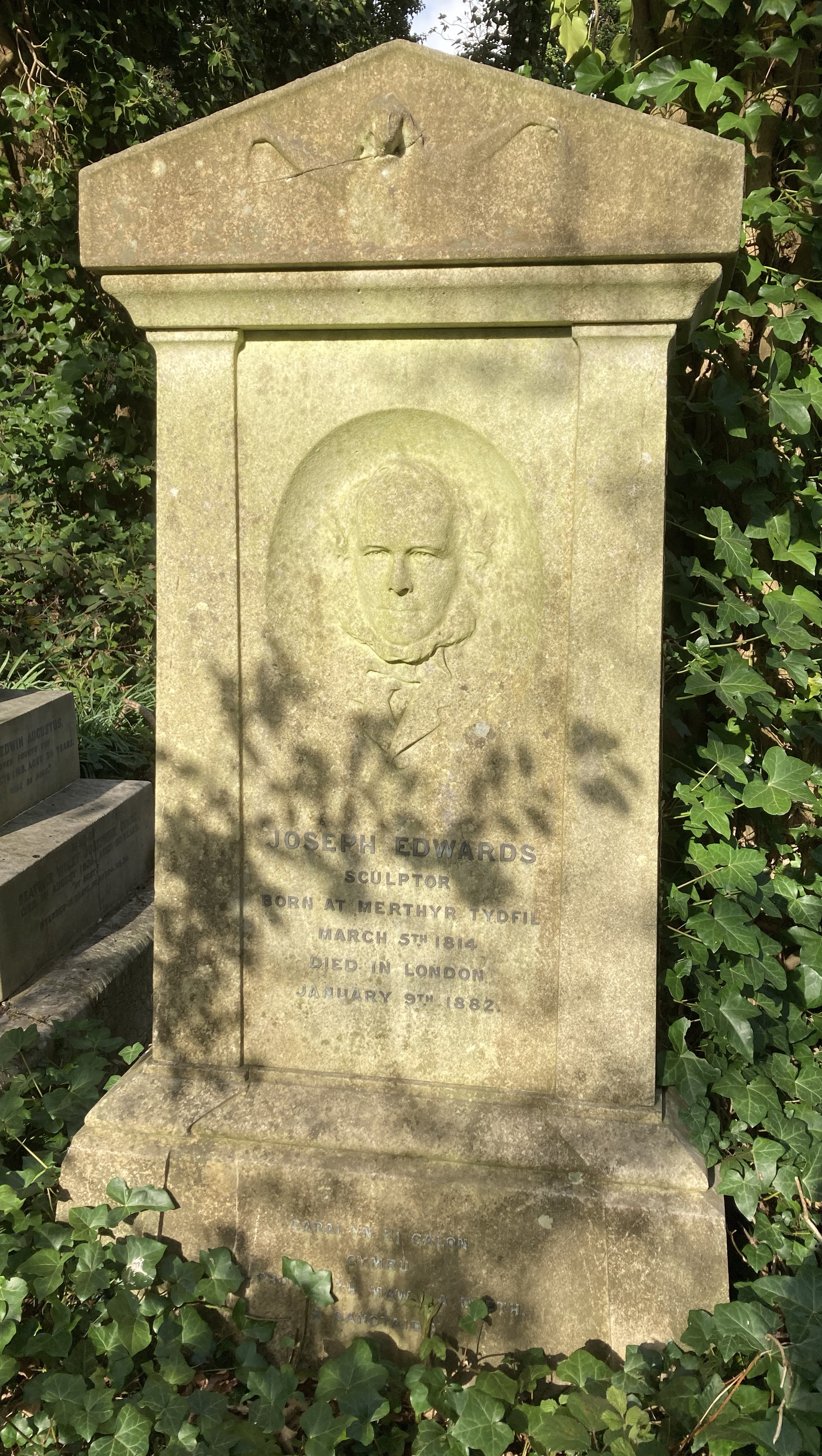
Grave of Joseph Edwards in Highgate Cemetery, set in ivy-covered surrounds, with his bas-relief portrait

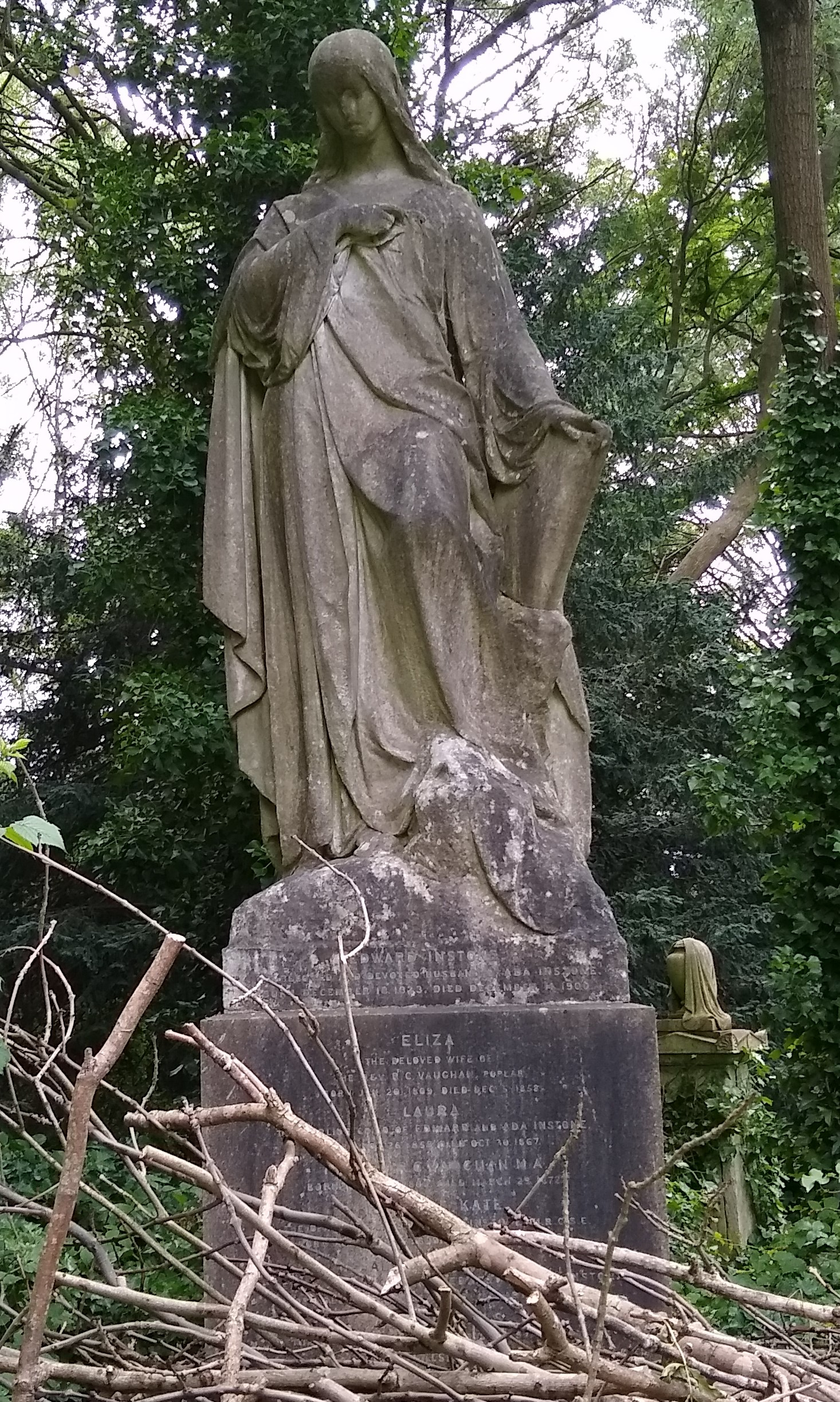
Monument to Eliza Vaughan at Highgate Cemetery (West)
