= Kingsnympton Hall =

Building in Kingston-on-Thames

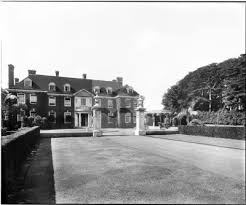
- Kingsnympton Hall, Kingston-on-Thames, photographed by Bedford Lemere on 17 August 1927
- Former names: Hay Green
- Alternative names: Hay Green Hall

General information
- Type: house
- Location: Kingston-on-Thames, England

Technical details
- Structural system: Timber frame, brick

Kingsnympton Hall, formerly known as Hay Green, was a historic house in Kingston-on-Thames, Surrey. It sustained heavy damage during a Luftwaffe raid on 9 September 1940. After the war it was demolished. The house boasted a glass-roofed bath house with a rectangular swimming pool. Hay Green was renamed Kingsnympton Hall at some point in the mid to late 1920s. Two historic lodges remain intact, North Lodge and South Lodge, in Kingsnympton Park; these are now listed buildings in their own right.

== See also ==
- Kingston-on-Thames
- Kingston Hill Murder
