= Arthur Hall (stationer) =

Arthur Hall was a nineteenth-century publisher and writer based in Paternoster Row, London.

In 1848 he took over Sharpe's London Magazine from T. B. Sharpe, who had founded it in 1845 as a weekly publication. Hall made it a monthly, and moved it upmarket; the editor at the time was Frank Smedley. It appeared as Journal rather than Magazine from 1849 to 1852. At this time Hall went into business with George Virtue, forming Arthur Hall, Virtue & Co. In the 1850s the firm published the "Hofland Library", a large collection of the juvenile works of Barbara Hofland.

== Works ==
- Who hath believed our report? : a letter to the editor of the Athenaeum, on some affinities of the Hebrew language (1890)
- "Shakspere's Handwriting" Further Illustrated (1899)
- Timothy Hall in the Dictionary of National Biography
