= Yr Ymofynnydd =

Welsh Unitarian magazine

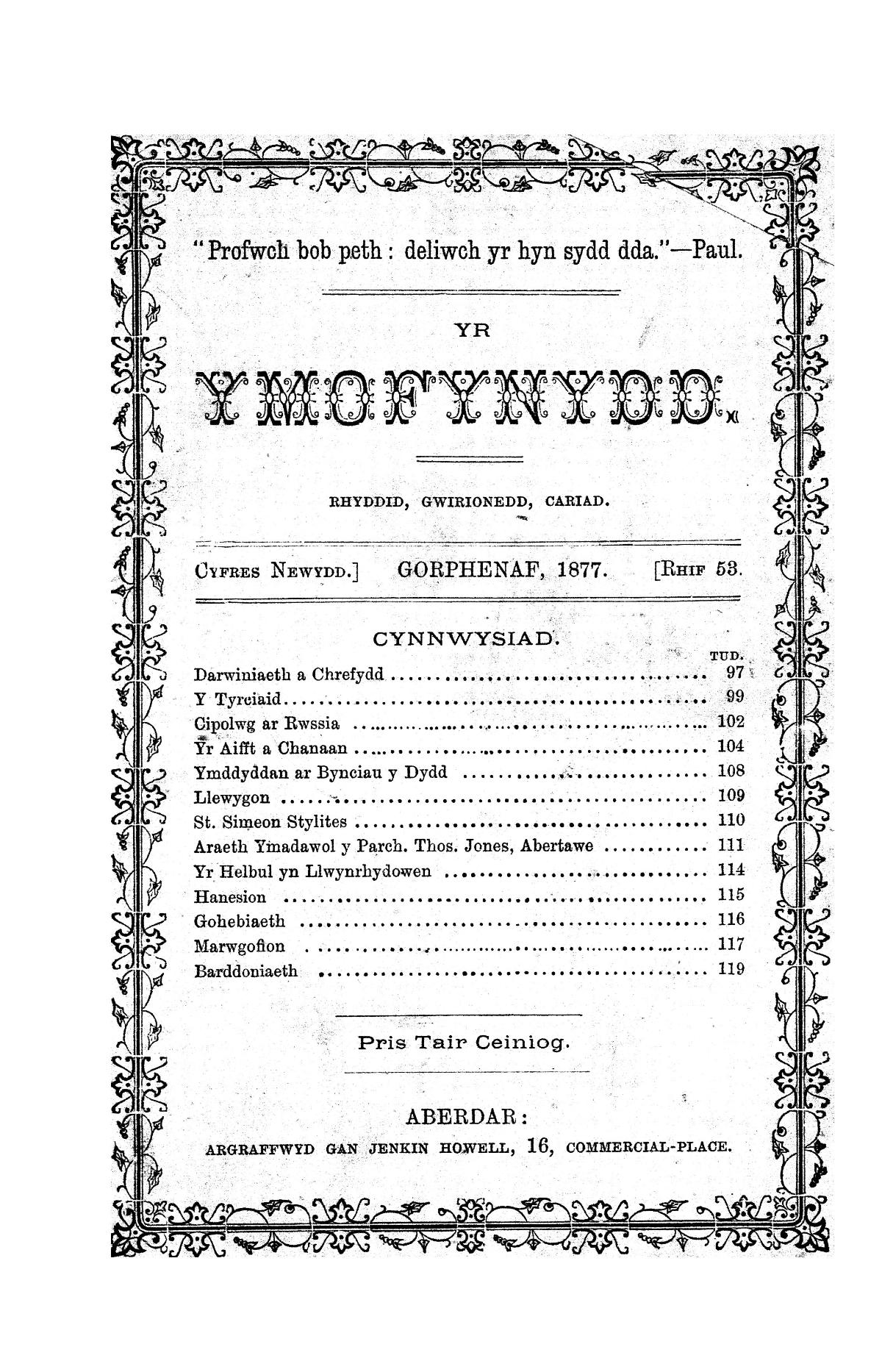
Yr Ymofynydd cover, 1877

Yr Ymofynnydd (the Inquirer), is the monthly magazine of Welsh-speaking Unitarians, published since 1847.
