= William Henry Bartlett =

English artist (1809–1854)

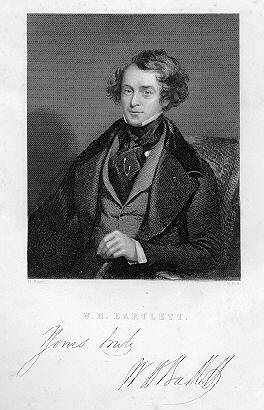
- Self-portrait of W H Bartlett, from the cover of his book Working A Canoe Up A Rapid.
- Born: 26 March 1809
- Died: 13 September 1854 (aged 45)
- Known for: Steel engraving

William Henry Bartlett (26 March 1809 – 13 September 1854) was a British artist, best known for his numerous drawings rendered into steel engravings.

== Biography ==
Bartlett was born in Kentish Town, London, England on 26 March 1809. He was apprenticed to John Britton (1771–1857), and became one of the foremost illustrators of topography of his generation. He travelled throughout Britain, and in the mid and late 1840s he travelled extensively in the Balkans and the Middle East. He made four visits to North America between 1836 and 1852.

In 1835, Bartlett first visited the United States to draw the buildings, towns and scenery of the northeastern states. The finely detailed steel engravings Bartlett produced were published uncolored with a text by Nathaniel Parker Willis as American Scenery; or Land, Lake, and River: Illustrations of Transatlantic Nature. American Scenery was published by George Virtue in London in 30 monthly installments from 1837 to 1839. Bound editions of the work were published from 1840 onward. The same publisher produced The Poems, Letters and Land of Robert Burns with engravings by Bartlett in 1838. In that same year Bartlett was in the Canadas producing sketches for Willis' Canadian Scenery Illustrated, published in 1842. Following a trip to the Middle East, he published Walks About the City and Environs of Jerusalem in 1840.

Bartlett made sepia wash drawings the exact size to be engraved. His engraved views were widely copied by artists, but no signed oil painting by his hand is known. Engravings based on Bartlett's views were later used in his posthumous History of the United States of North America, continued by Bernard Bolingbroke Woodward and published around 1856.

Bartlett's primary concern was to render "lively impressions of actual sights", as he wrote in the preface to The Nile Boat (London, 1849). Many views contain some ruin or element of the past including many scenes of churches, abbeys, cathedrals and castles, and Nathaniel Parker Willis described Bartlett's talent thus: "Bartlett could select his point of view so as to bring prominently into his sketch the castle or the cathedral, which history or antiquity had allowed".

Bartlett returning from his last trip to the Near East suddenly took ill and died of fever on board the French steamer Egyptus off the coast of Malta on 13 September 1854. His widow Susanna lived for almost 50 years after his death, and died in London on 25 October 1902, aged 91.

== Works ==
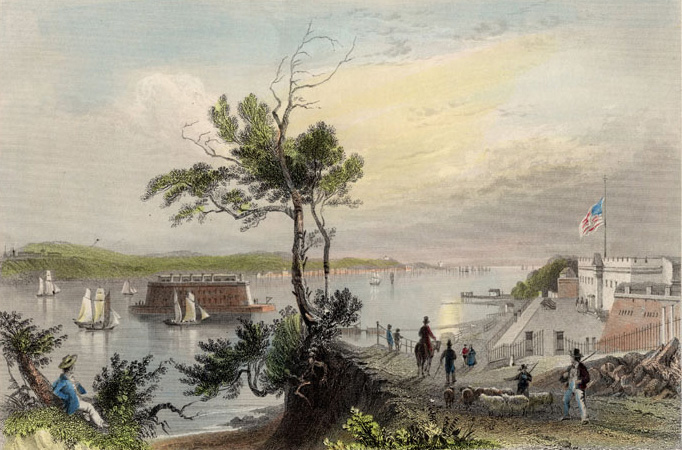
W. H. Bartlett, "THE NARROWS, (From Fort Hamilton)," R. Wallis. London, Published for the Proprietors, by Geo. Virtue, 26, Ivy Lane, 1839.

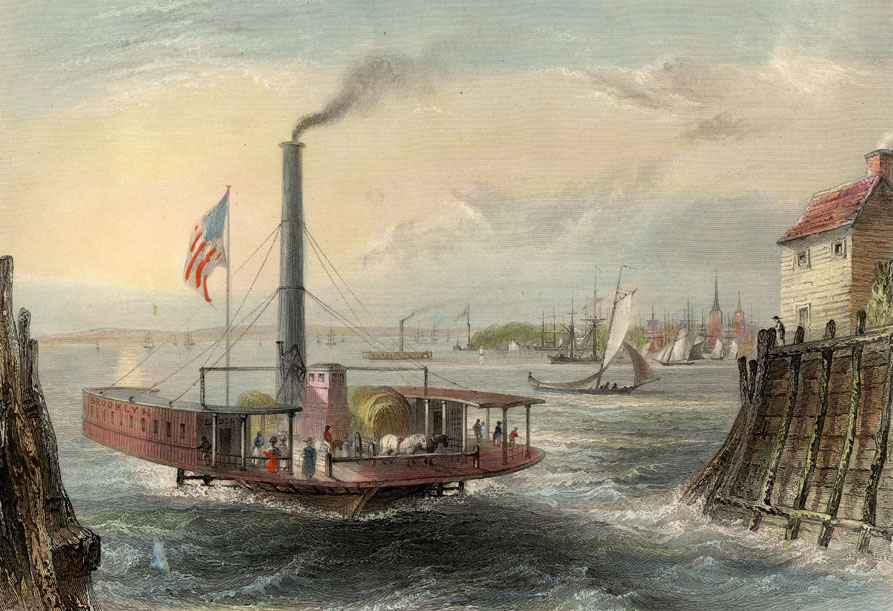
W. H. Bartlett, "THE FERRY AT BROOKLYN, NEW YORK.", G. K. Richardson. London, Published for the Proprietors, by Geo. Virtue, 26, Ivy Lane, 1838.

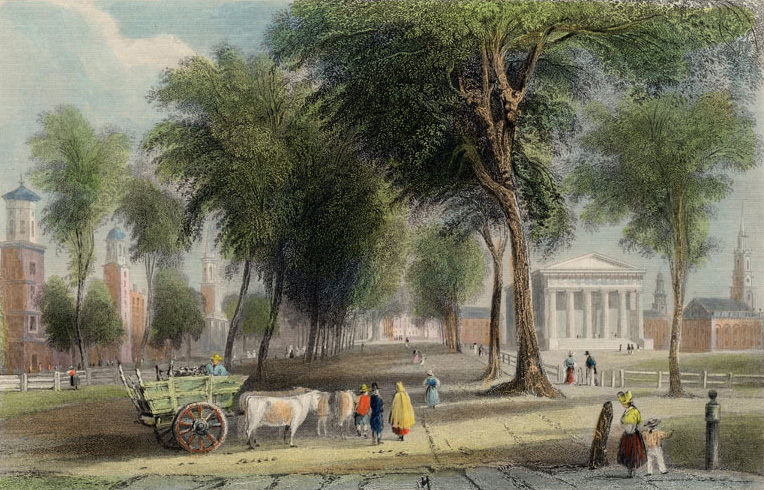
American Scenery, 2 vols. 1840, W. H. Bartlett, "YALE COLLEGE" (Newhaven), J. Sands. London, Published for the Proprietors, by Geo. Virtue, 26, Ivy Lane, 1838.

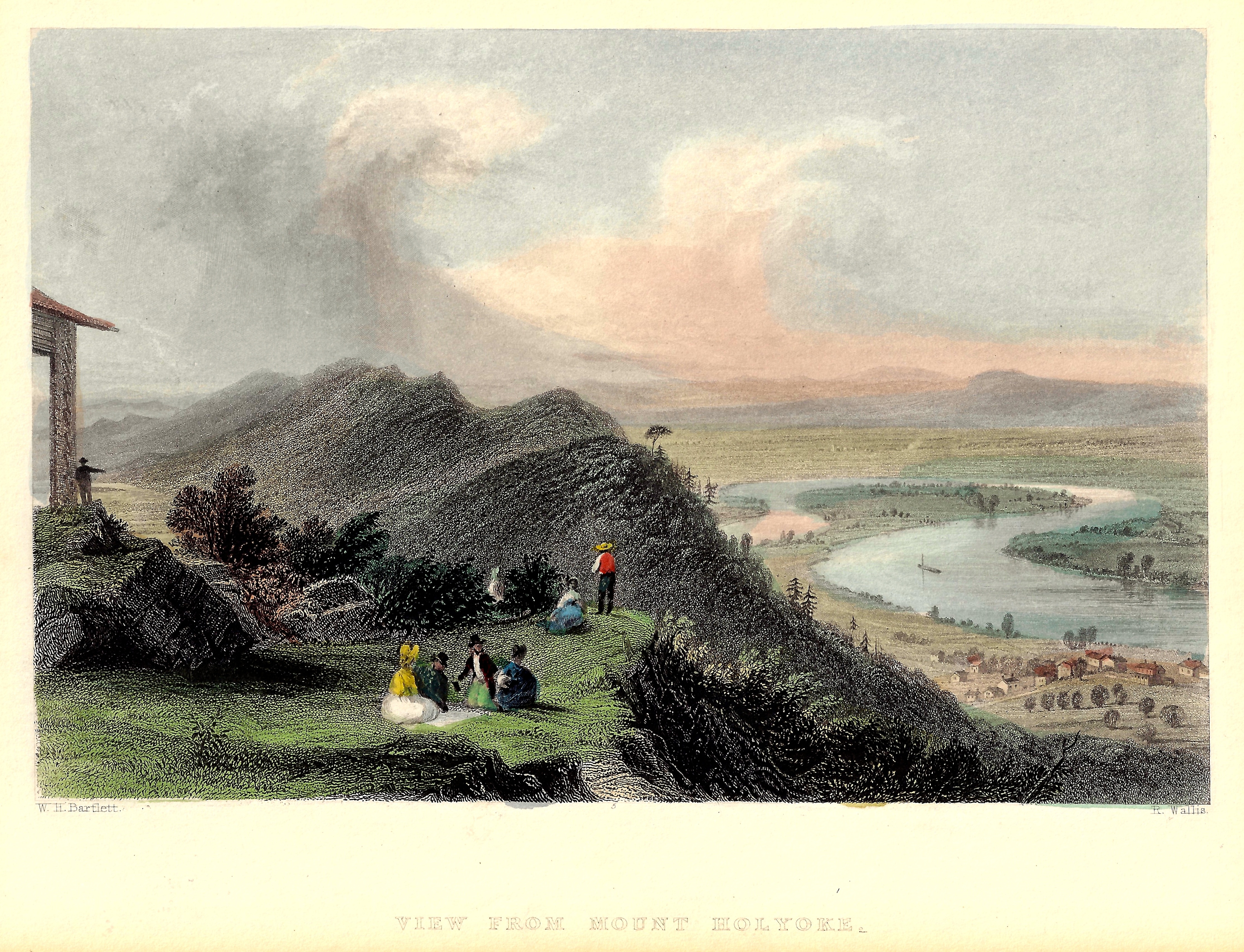
View from Mount Holyoke (Massachusetts). The Oxbow, Connecticut River, 1835

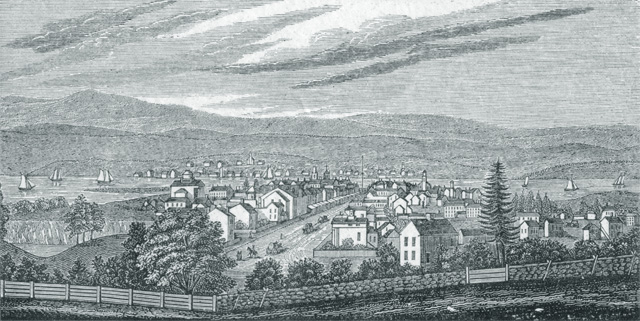
City of Hudson, NY, 1837

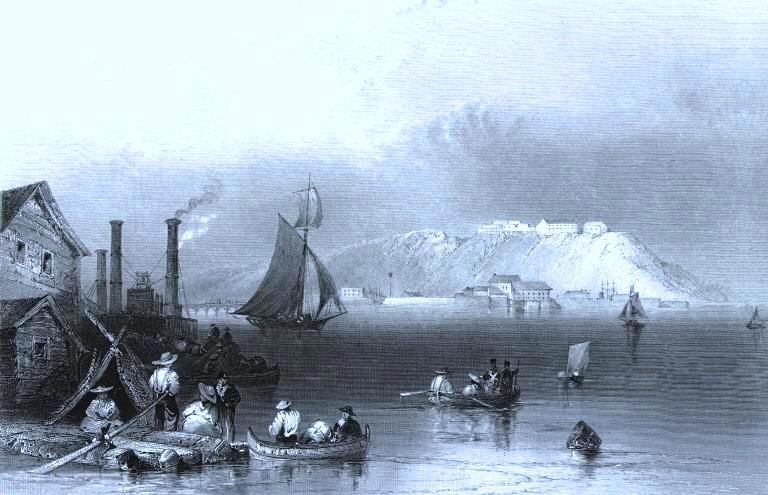
Citadel of Kingston. Ink print. 1839–1842.

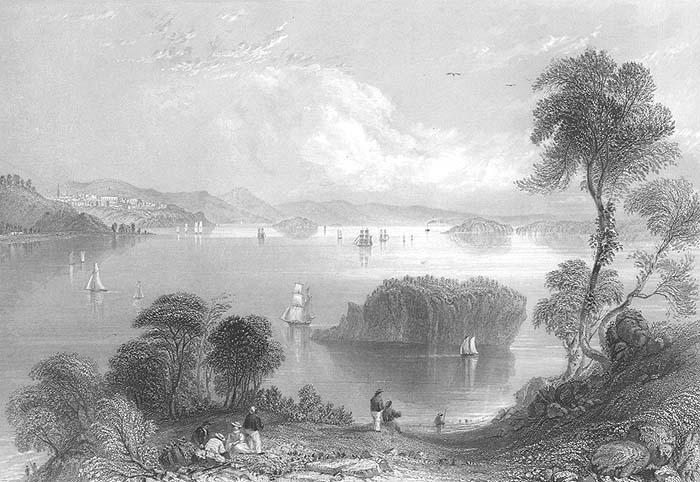
Eastport and Passamaquoddy Bay, 1839

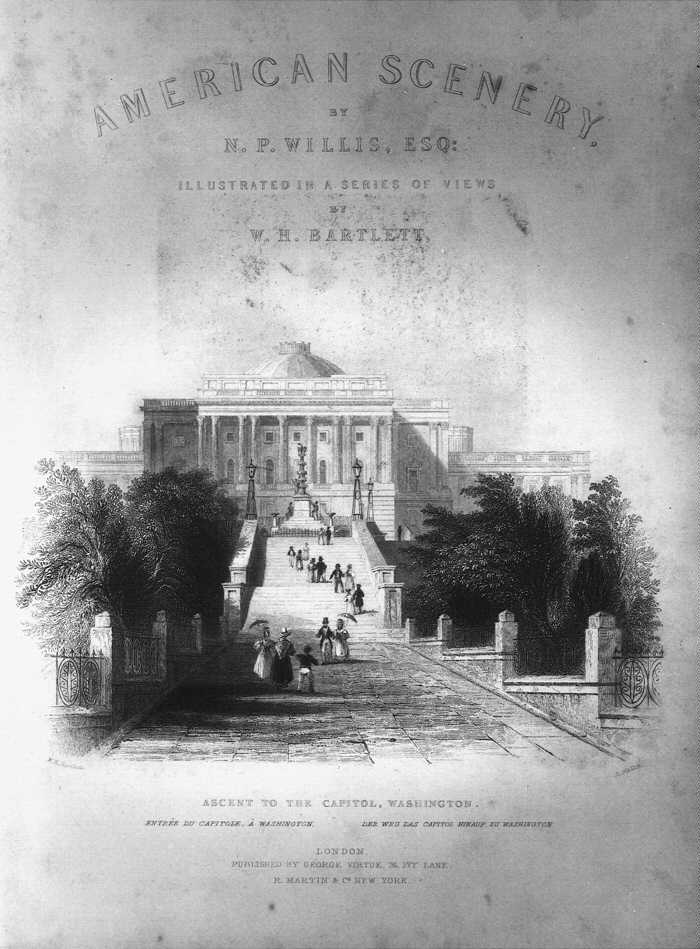
American Scenery by N. P. Willis, 1840

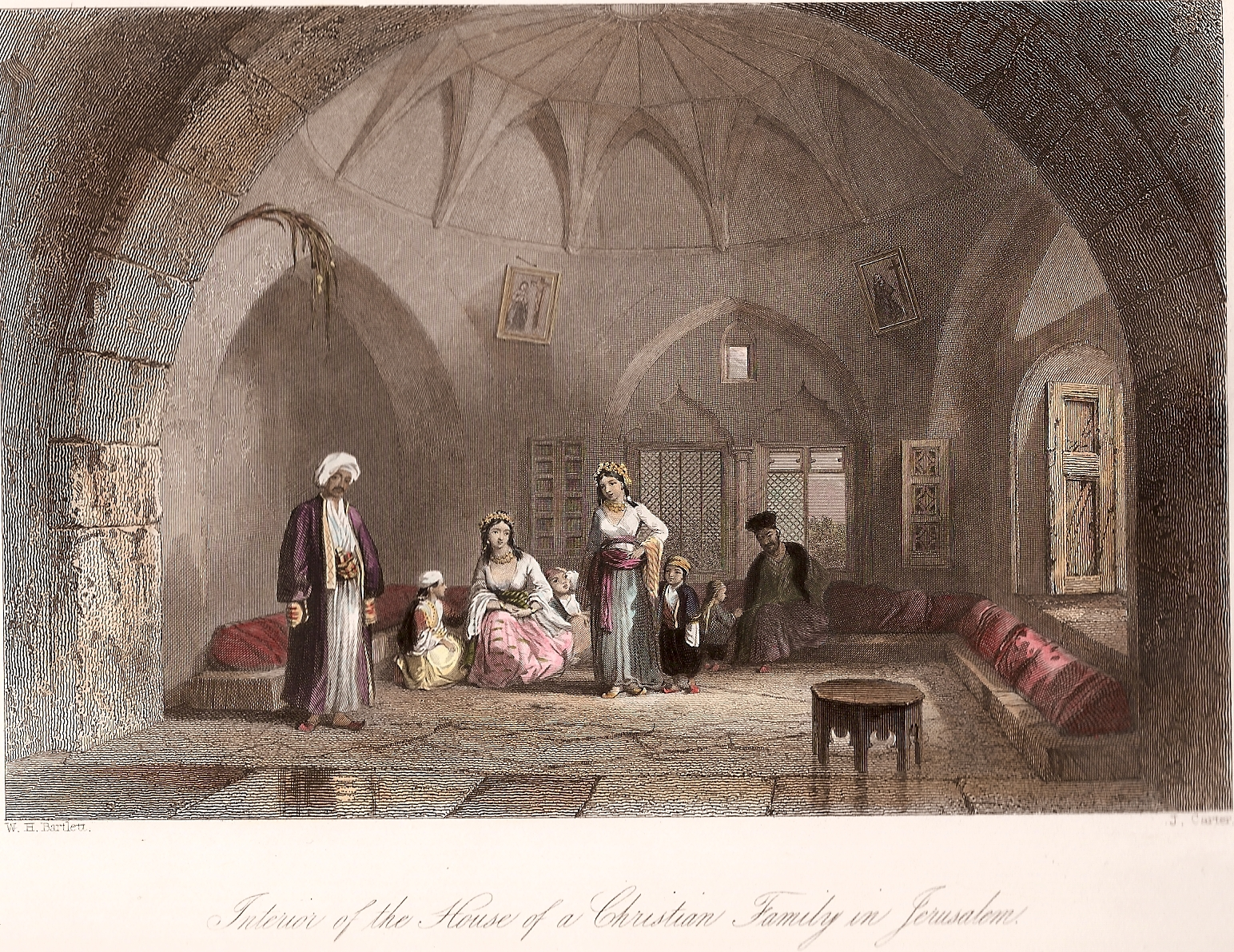
Interior of the house of a Christian family in Jerusalem, ca 1850

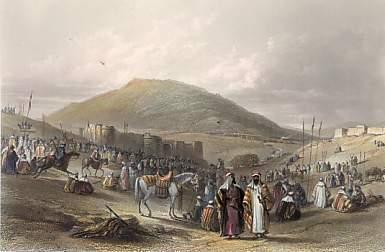
Fair at Khan al-Tujjar, ca 1850

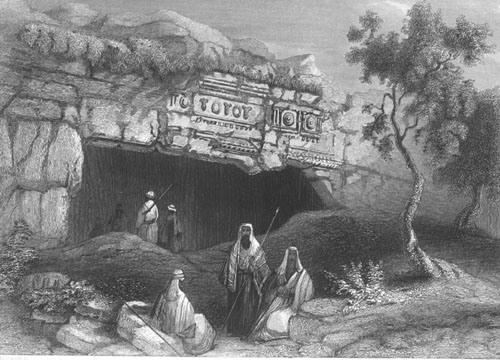
Tombs of the Kings (Jerusalem)

== Bibliography ==
- Janice Tyrwhitt and Henry C. Campbell, Bartlett’s Canada: A Pre-Confederation Journey (McClelland and Stewart Limited: Toronto, 1968).
