= The Art Journal =

British art magazine founded in 1839

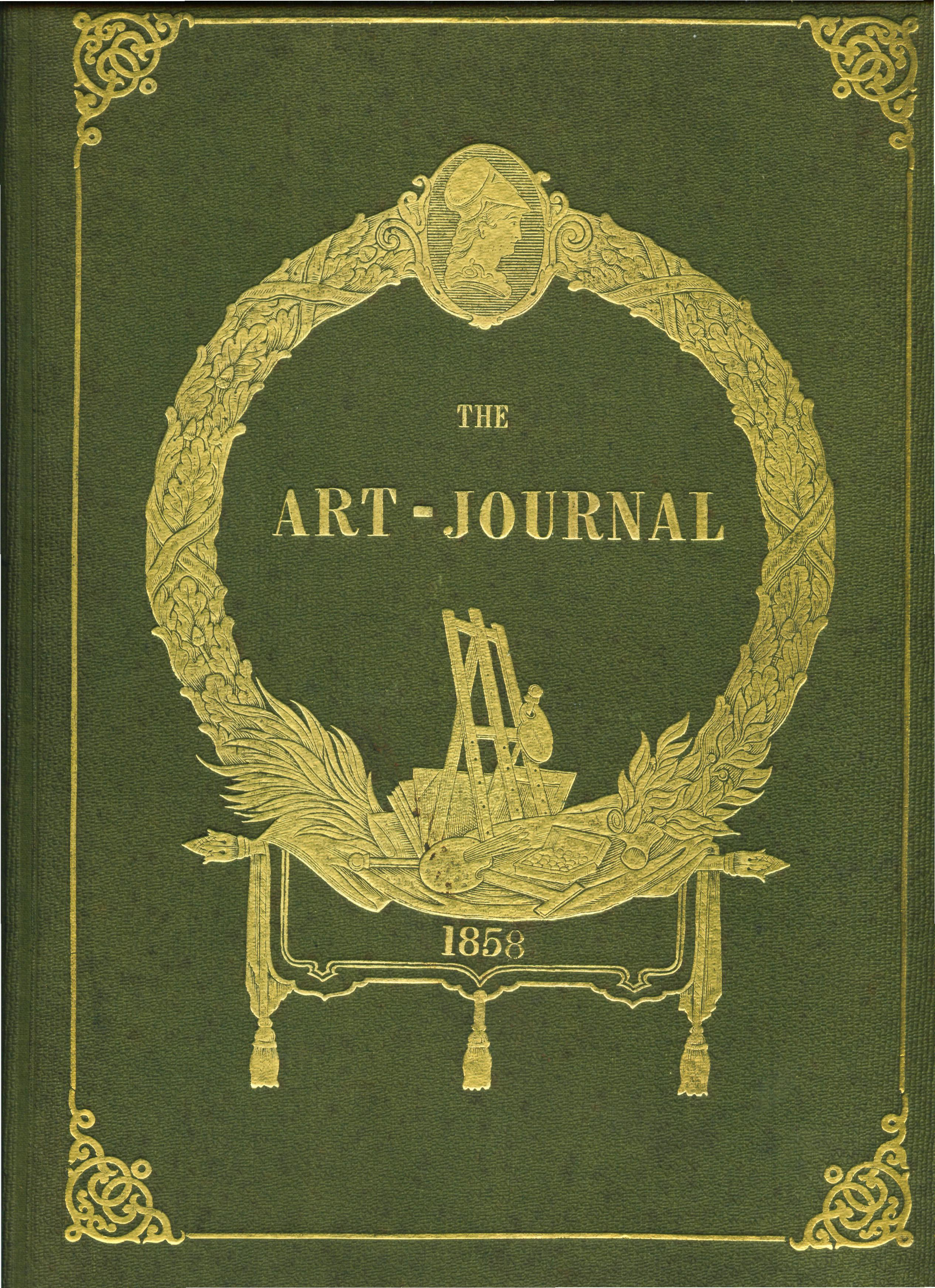
- Cover of a bound volume of The Art Journal from 1858
- Categories: Victorian art
- Frequency: Monthly
- Publisher: Hodgson & Graves; Samuel Carter Hall; George Virtue; J. S. Virtue
- First issue: 15 February 1839
- Final issue: 1912
- Country: United Kingdom
- Based in: London
- OCLC: 1514293

The Art Journal was the most important British 19th-century magazine on art. It was founded in 1839 by Hodgson & Graves, print publishers, 6 Pall Mall, with the title Art Union Monthly Journal (or The Art Union), the first issue of 750 copies appearing 15 February 1839. It was published in London but its readership was global in reach.

== History ==
Hodgson & Graves hired Samuel Carter Hall as editor of Art Union Monthly Journal, assisted by James Dafforne. Hall soon became the principal proprietor, but he was unable to turn a profit on his own. The London publisher George Virtue bought a share of the business in 1848, with Hall remaining as editor, and they renamed the periodical The Art Journal in 1849.

In 1851, as part of the "Great Exhibition" of that year, The Art Journal featured Hall's engravings of 150 pictures from the private collections of Queen Victoria and Prince Albert. Although this project was popular, the publication remained unprofitable, forcing Hall to sell his share of the journal to Virtue, while staying on as editor. In 1852, the journal finally turned a profit.

As editor, Hall exposed the profits that custom-houses were earning on the import of Old Masters, and showed how paintings were manufactured in England. The Art Journal became noted for its honest portrayal of the fine arts, and its opposition to fake and mis-attributed Old Masters, such as many claimed to be by Raphael and Titian, depressed the market in such works.

The early issues of the magazine, published monthly, strongly supported the artists of The Clique, and after 1850 it became associated with opposition to the emerging Pre-Raphaelite Brotherhood (PRB), which Hall considered to be a reactionary movement. Its articles attacked the PRB and its supporter John Ruskin.

After Hall's retirement in 1880, the journal changed its position, and faced strong competition from the Magazine of Art and the changing public taste influenced by Impressionism. Neither magazine was able to survive: the Magazine of Art ceased publication in 1904, and The Art Journal in 1912. An American edition of The Art Journal was published in New York from 1881 to 1887 by D. Appleton & Co.

The publication has been referred to, at various times, as London Art Journal and Art-Journal.

== Editorship ==
Editor's name	Years
Samuel Carter Hall	1839–1880
Marcus Bourne Huish	1881–1892
David Croal Thomson	1892–1902

== Contributors ==
The Art Journal's most notable essayists included Ralph Nicholson Wornum, Thomas Wright, Frederick William Fairholt, Edward Lewes Cutts, and Llewellynn Jewitt. Richard Austin Artlett supplied a long series of engraved plates of sculpture.
