= George Virtue =

British publisher

George C. Virtue (1794 – 8 December 1868) was a 19th-century London-based publisher. His publishing house was located at 26 Ivy Lane, Paternoster Row.

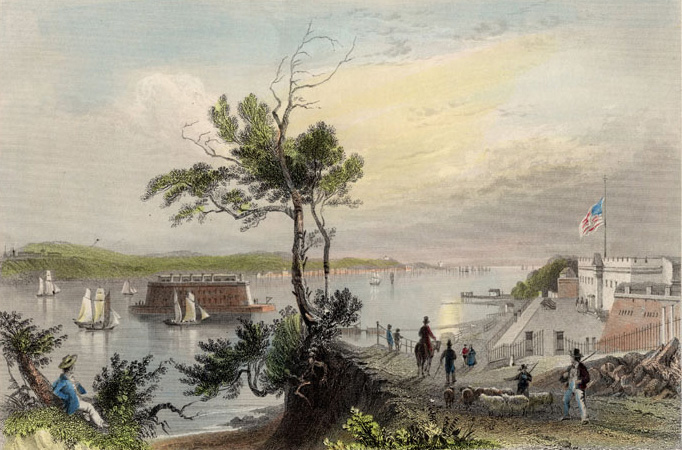
W. H. Bartlett, "The Narrows (from Fort Hamilton)", published by Virtue in 1839

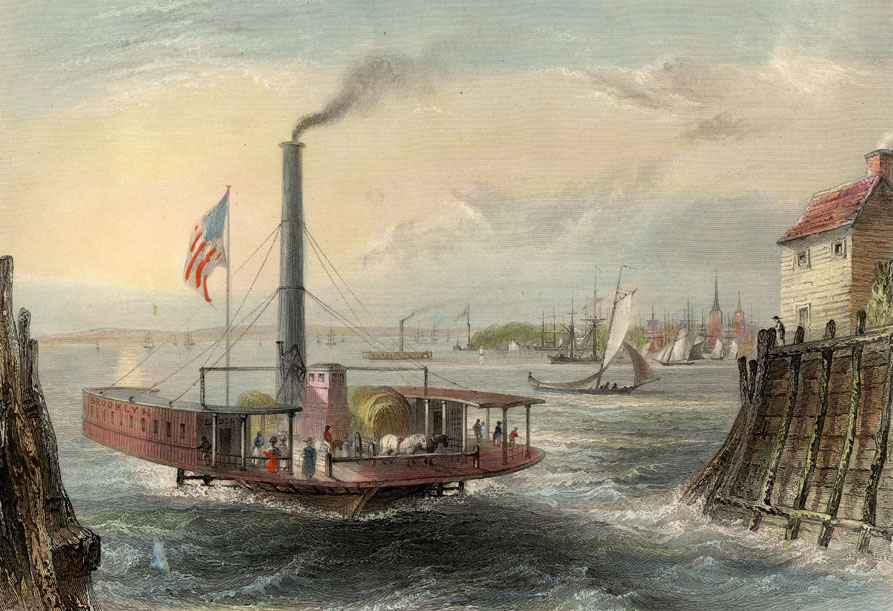
W. H. Bartlett, "The Ferry at Brooklyn, New York", published by Virtue in 1838

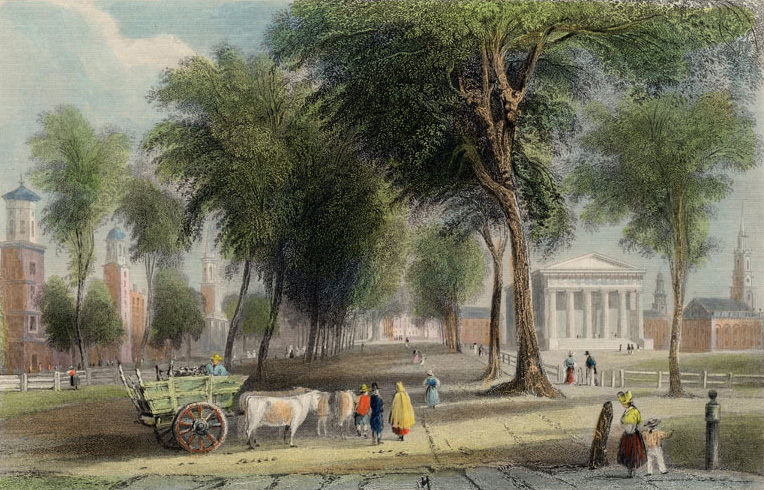
W. H. Bartlett, "Yale College", published by Virtue in 1838

== Pictorial publisher ==
Virtue selected accomplished artists, employed the best engravers, and produced books that were rarely surpassed in elegance and correctness for the period. Virtue created a prodigious business, issuing upwards of twenty thousand copper and steel engravings through his career. Chief among his publications were the following, all illustrated by William Henry Bartlett:

- The Picturesque Beauties of Great Britain: Essex, 1834
- Switzerland, by William Beattie, 2 vols. 1836;
- Scotland, by W. Beattie, 1838;
- The Waldenses, by W. Beattie, 1838;
- American Scenery, 2 vols. 1840;
- Description of the Beauties of the Bosphorus, by Julia Pardoe, 1840;
- The Danube, its History and Scenery, by W. Beattie, 1844.

== Magazine publisher ==
In 1848, Virtue purchased two magazines. One was an art publication, The Art Union, which had been founded in 1839 by Hodgson & Graves, then purchased in 1847 by Chapman & Hall. The second purchase was controlling interest in Sharpe's London Magazine, a literary and cultural magazine, Arthur Hall publisher. In 1849, Virtue renamed the art magazine The Art Journal and, in time, it became known as the premier art publication of Great Britain. Also in 1849, he created a new firm with Arthur Hall called "Arthur Hall, Virtue & Co.".

== Publishing houses ==
- George Virtue
  - 26 Ivy Lane, London
  - 25 Paternoster Row, London
  - 26 John Street, New York
- Arthur Hall, Virtue & Co.

== Family ==
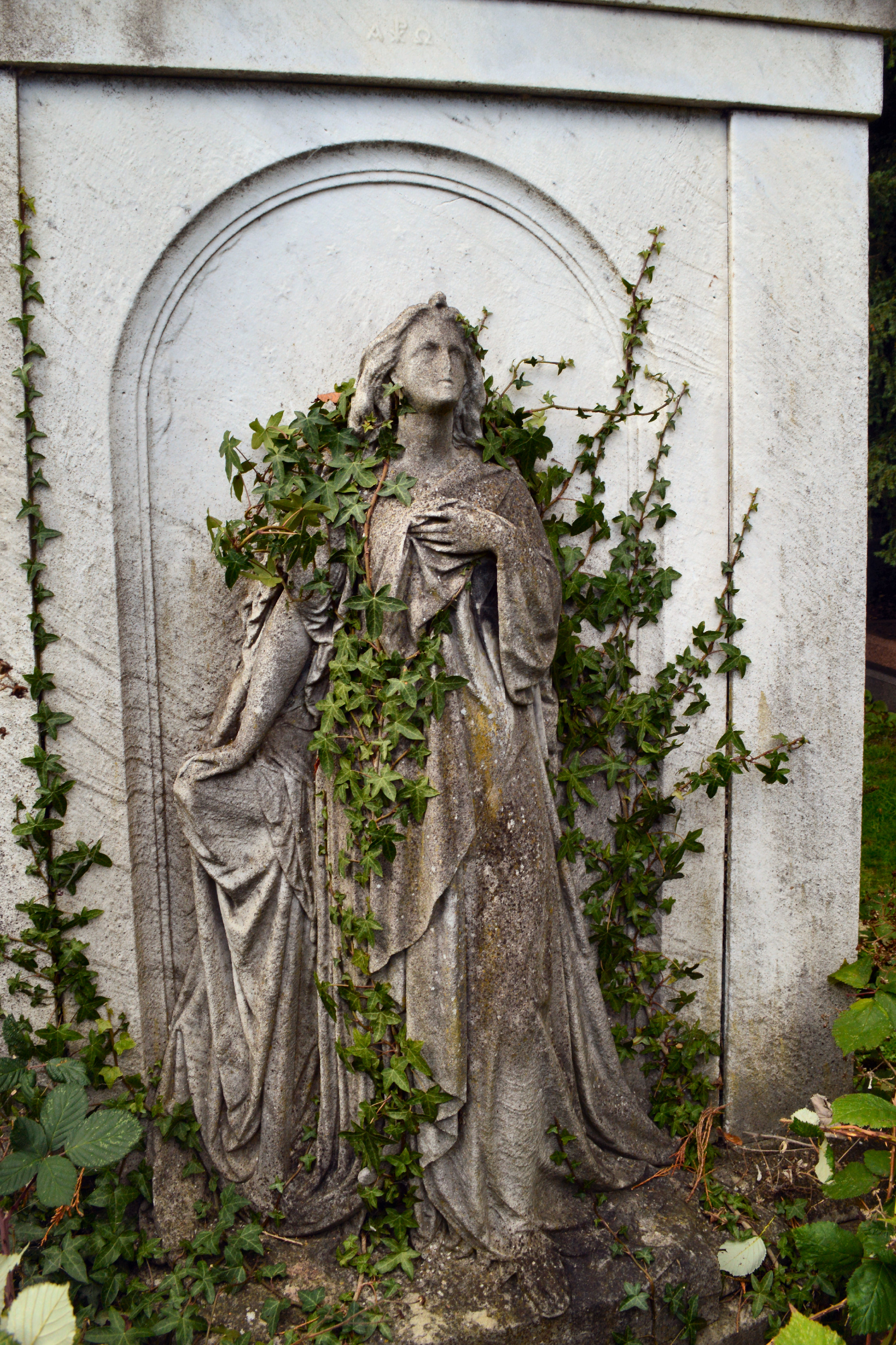
Grave of George Virtue by Joseph Edwards, Walton-on-Thames

Virtue's wife was named Helen.

Their oldest son, George Henry Virtue (d.1866) FSA was Treasurer of the Royal Numismatic Society for several years.

When Virtue retired from his publishing business in 1855, his second son, James Sprent Virtue, took over the business, having spent many years in the United States overseeing the Virtue's New York publishing house.

In 1861, the youngest son, William Alexander Virtue (d.1875), was promoted to Lieutenant, vice Turney, with the 39th Middlesex Rifle Volunteer Corps. In 1865, he became a partner in the Virtue's City Road and Ivy Lane publishing houses before moving to the United States and taking over the Virtue's New York publishing house, including "Virtue and Yorston" with Charles H. Yorston.

Virtue's daughter, Frances Virtue (d.1878), married the English essayist and historian, James Augustus Cotter Morison in 1861. They had one son, Theodore Morison, principal of Mohammedan Anglo-Oriental College from 1899–1905 which later on became Aligarh Muslim University and member of the Council of India from 1906; and daughters Helen Cotter, and Margaret.

== Community service ==
Virtue was a common councilman for the ward of Farringdon Within, and later was the deputy of his ward. He was a member of the court of the Stationers' Company and a director of the Great Central Gas Consumers' Company.

== Legacy ==
Virtue retired in Oatlands Park. He died in 1868 at the home of his daughter, Frances Morison, on Porchester Square, London. Much of his correspondence and other family records are archived in the Smithsonian through a donation of documents by Virtue's great-great-grandson, Michael Virtue. He is buried in Walton-on-Thames Cemetery; the sculpture on his grave is by Joseph Edwards.

== Selected publications ==
Musical scores

- Hogarth, G. (1850), The book of British song, OCLC 43226028
- Turle, J.; Taylor, E. (1848), 'A Collection of psalm and hymn tunes, comprising the best compositions in general use, and including many by eminent English and foreign musicians, which are now, for the first time, published in this country: harmonized for four voices, with an arrangement for the organ and pianoforte forming the first part of the People's music book, OCLC 57245096

Pictorials

- Armytage, J. C.; Warren, H. (1850), The Washington National Monument, OCLC 21000902
- Bartlett, W. H.; Willmore, J. T.; Willis, N. P. (1838), Boston from the Dorchester Heights, OCLC 57745958
- Bartlett, W. H.; Wallis, R; Virtue, G. (1837), View From West Point (Hudson River) (coloured engraving), OCLC 7251506
- Griffiths, H.; Bartlett, W. H.; Willis, N. P. (1838), Faneuiel [sic] Hall, Boston, OCLC 57744083
- Hunt, T. W.; Dubourjal, S. E.; Bartlett, W. H .; Woodward, B. B. (1856), John Quincy Adams, New York, OCLC 57747319
- Lacey, S.; Bartlett, W. H.; Willis, N. P. (1839), Saw mill at Centre Harbour (Lake Winnipesaukee), OCLC 57744145
- Lacey, S.; Bartlett, W. H.; Willis, N. P. (1837), State Street, Boston, OCLC 57745594
