= Lumb Stocks =

British engraver (1812–1892)

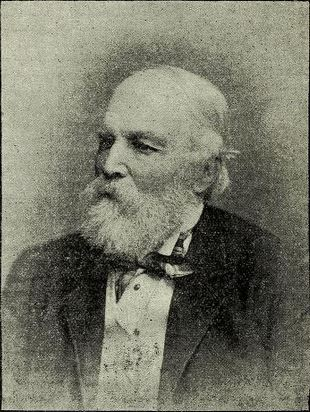
- Photo of Lumb Stocks from the Yorkshire County Magazine 1891
- Born: 29 November 1812; Lightcliffe, Yorkshire, England
- Died: 28 April 1892 (aged 79); Islington, London, England
- Occupation: Engraver
- Years active: 60

Lumb Stocks RA (29 November 1812 – 28 April 1892) was a British engraver. In a long career he produced engravings from paintings by notable artists of the day.

== Early life ==
Lumb Stocks was born at Gawbert Hall, Lightcliffe, near Halifax, Yorkshire, the third of five children of William Stocks, a coalmine-owner, and wife Mary née Lumb. He was educated at Horton House School, Horton, near Bradford, and while there he received instruction in drawing from Charles Cope, father of the painter and engraver Charles West Cope. Aged fifteen he moved to London and was apprenticed for six years to the line engraver Charles Rolls. In 1832 he exhibited at the Royal Academy of Arts a Portrait of a Young Artist. His apprenticeship ended in 1833.

== Early career ==
Stocks engraved plates for the literary annuals then in vogue, among which were "The Lace Maker" and "Going to Service", after James Inskipp, for the Amulet of 1835. He engraved for William Finden's Royal Gallery of British Art (1838–1840) the plates of "The Procession to the Christening", after Penry Williams, "Preparing Moses for the Fair", from The Vicar of Wakefield, after Daniel Maclise, and "Nell Gwyn", after Charles Landseer. He produced "Raffaelle and the Fornarina" (1842), after Sir Augustus Wall Callcott, engraved for the Art Union of London; and three plates – "The Glee Maiden" and "Ruth", after Robert Scott Lauder, and "The Parable of the Ten Virgins", after James Eckford Lauder – engraved for the Association for the Promotion of the Fine Arts in Scotland.

At about this time he produced "The Dame School" and "The Rubber", after Thomas Webster, and "Bedtime", after William Powell Frith, and several plates for The Art Journal from pictures in the Royal Collection and Vernon collection, which included "Cupid and Psyche", after Thomas Uwins, "Uncle Toby and the Widow", after Charles Robert Leslie, and "St Luke painting the Virgin", after Moritz Steinla.

== Royal Academy and later career ==
In 1853, Stocks was elected an associate engraver of the Royal Academy of Arts, and in 1855 became an associate engraver of the new class, which rendered him eligible for the higher rank of academician, to which he was elected in 1871.

About 1859, he engraved for the Art Union of Glasgow "Many Happy Returns of the Day", after Frith, which was followed by a series of plates illustrating "The Dowie Dens of Yarrow", after Sir Joseph Noel Paton, and later by "The Gentle Shepherd", after David Wilkie, and "O Nannie, wilt thou gang wi' me?" after Thomas Faed, for the Association for the Promotion of the Fine Arts in Scotland.

In 1865, he engraved for the Art Union of London "Claude Duval," after Frith. In February 1866, it commissioned him to engrave The Meeting of Wellington and Blücher after the Battle of Waterloo, the mural by Daniel Maclise measuring 44 inches (110 cm) by 12 inches (30 cm) in the Royal Gallery of the House of Lords.

Also for the Art Union of London he engraved "Dr. Johnson waiting for an Audience of Lord Chesterfield", after Edward Matthew Ward; and "Stolen by Gipsies: the Rescue", after John Bagnold Burgess, which had been left unfinished by Charles Henry Jeens.

Among other and later works by Stocks were "Charlotte Corday in the Conciergerie" and "Marie Antoinette listening to the Act of Accusation the day before her Trial", after E. M. Ward; "Detected", by John Callcott Horsley; "The Fight Interrupted", after William Mulready; "The Odalisque" and "The Sister's Kiss", after Sir Frederic Leighton; "The Silken Gown", after Thomas Faed; "Olivia and Viola", from "Twelfth Night", after Sir Joseph Noel Paton; "A Souvenir of Velasquez" and "The Princes in the Tower", after Sir John Everett Millais; and "A Spanish Letter Writer", after John Bagnold Burgess.

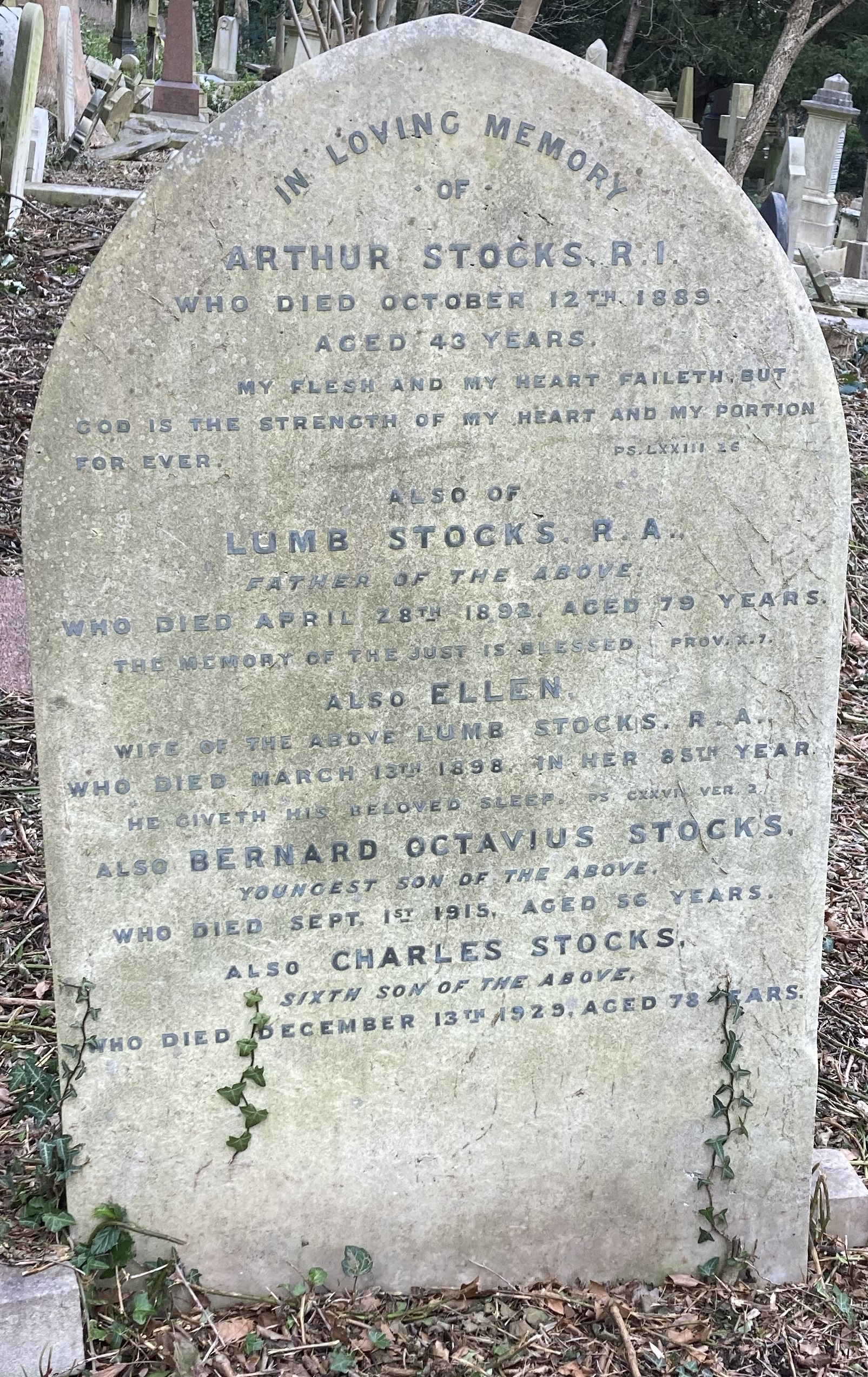
Family grave of Lumb Stocks in Highgate Cemetery (west side)

== Personal life ==
In 1839, he married Ellen Fryer (1813–1898), the eldest daughter of William Fryer, of the firm of Messrs. J. & W. Fryer, Manufacturers, of Eastrick and New Bridge Street, Blackfriars, and they lived initially in Islington, London. They had eight sons and a daughter. Their second son Walter Fryer Stocks (1842–1915), and their third son Arthur Stocks (1846–1889), were both painters whose works were exhibited at the Royal Academy and elsewhere. A son of Walter Fryer Stocks was Harold Carpenter Lumb Stocks, a cathedral organist and composer.

Stocks died on 28 April 1892, at his home in Holloway, London, where he had lived since 1845, and was buried in the west side of Highgate Cemetery (grave no.28581) with his son Arthur who had predeceased him. In the same family grave were later buried his wife Ellen, and sons Charles and Bernard, also an engraver. Nearby is the shared grave of Walter Fryer Stocks and his wife Marian.

== Gallery ==
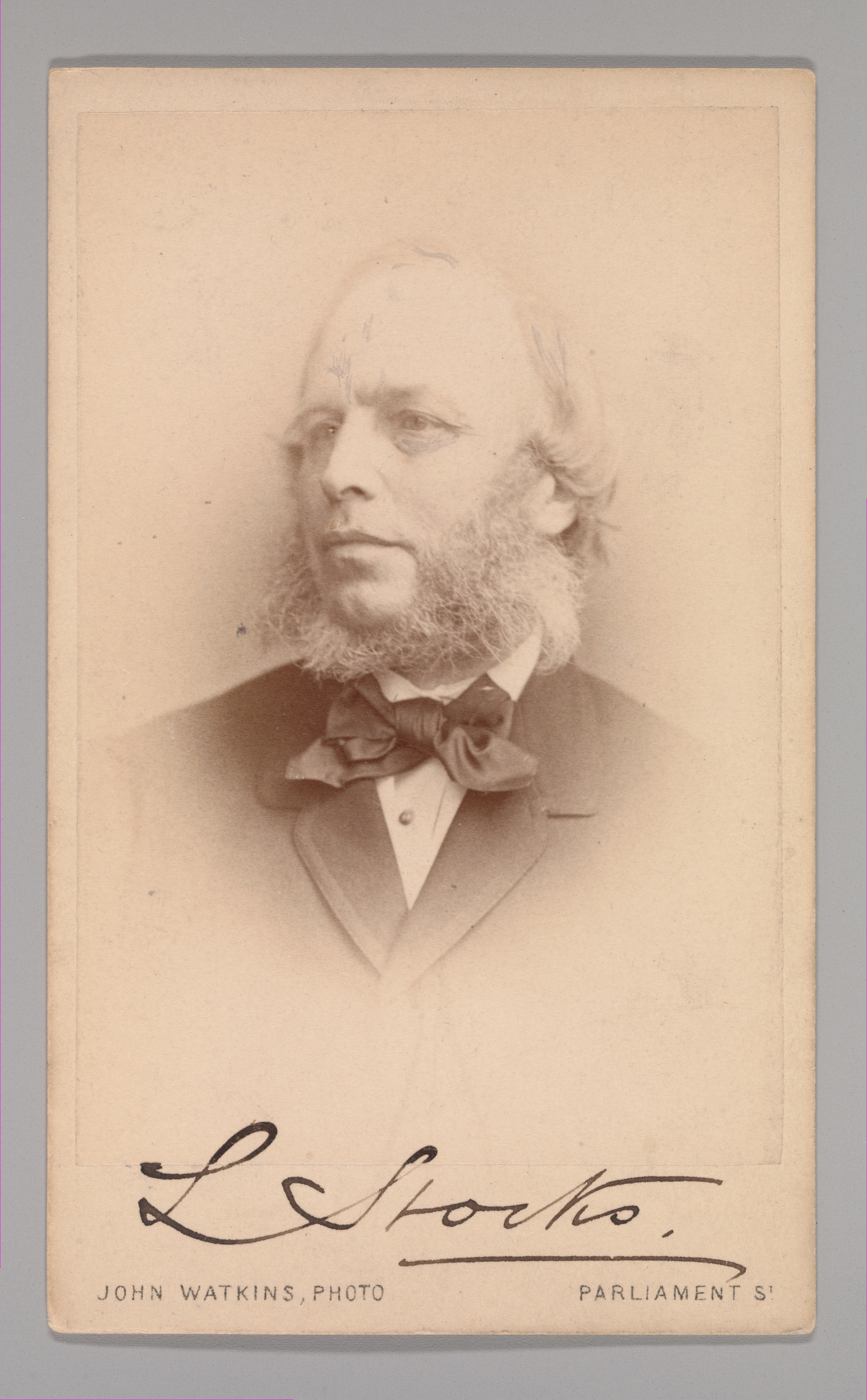
Lumb Stocks, 1860s

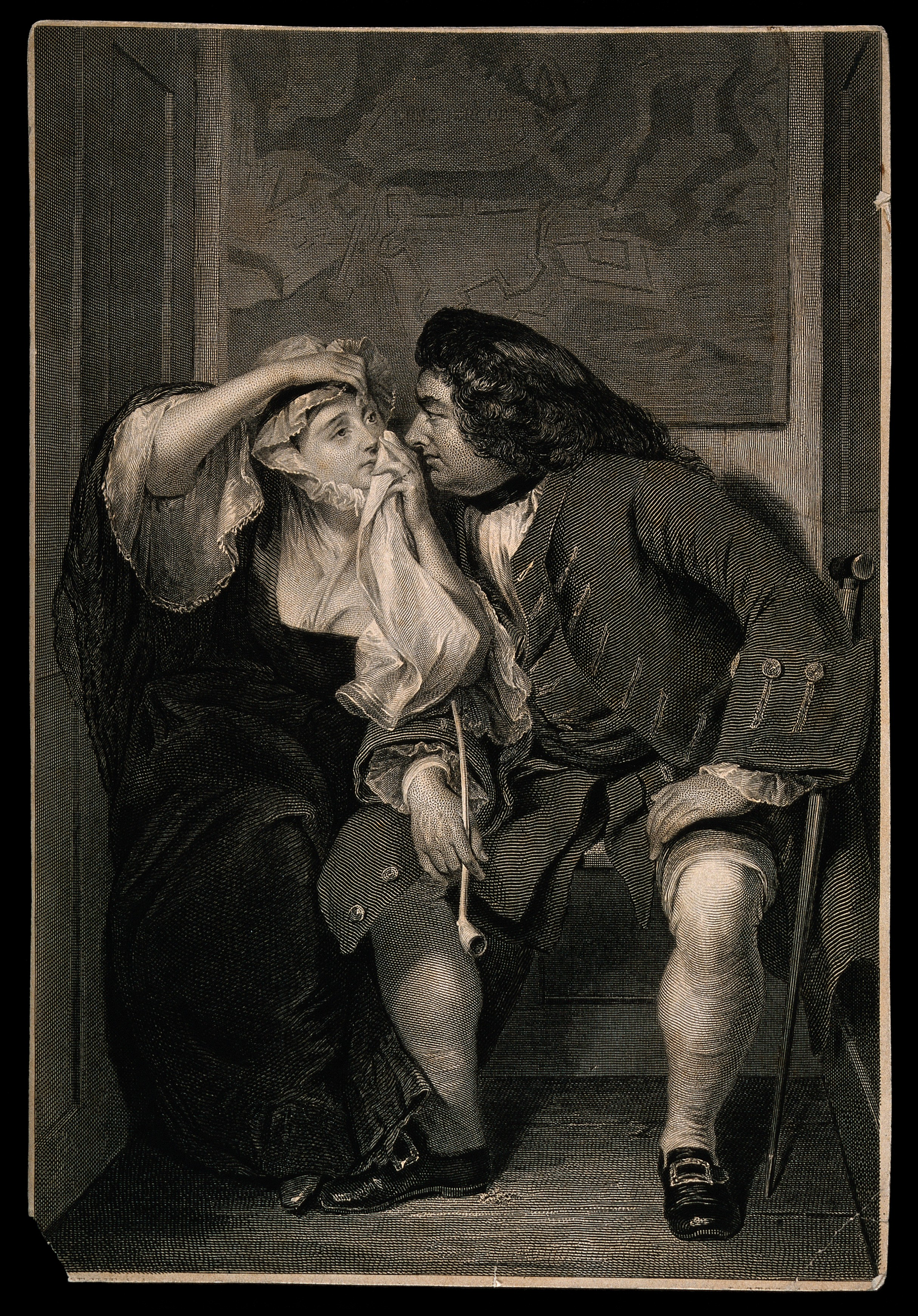
Uncle Toby and the Widow, a scene from Laurence Sterne's Tristram Shandy, after C. R. Leslie

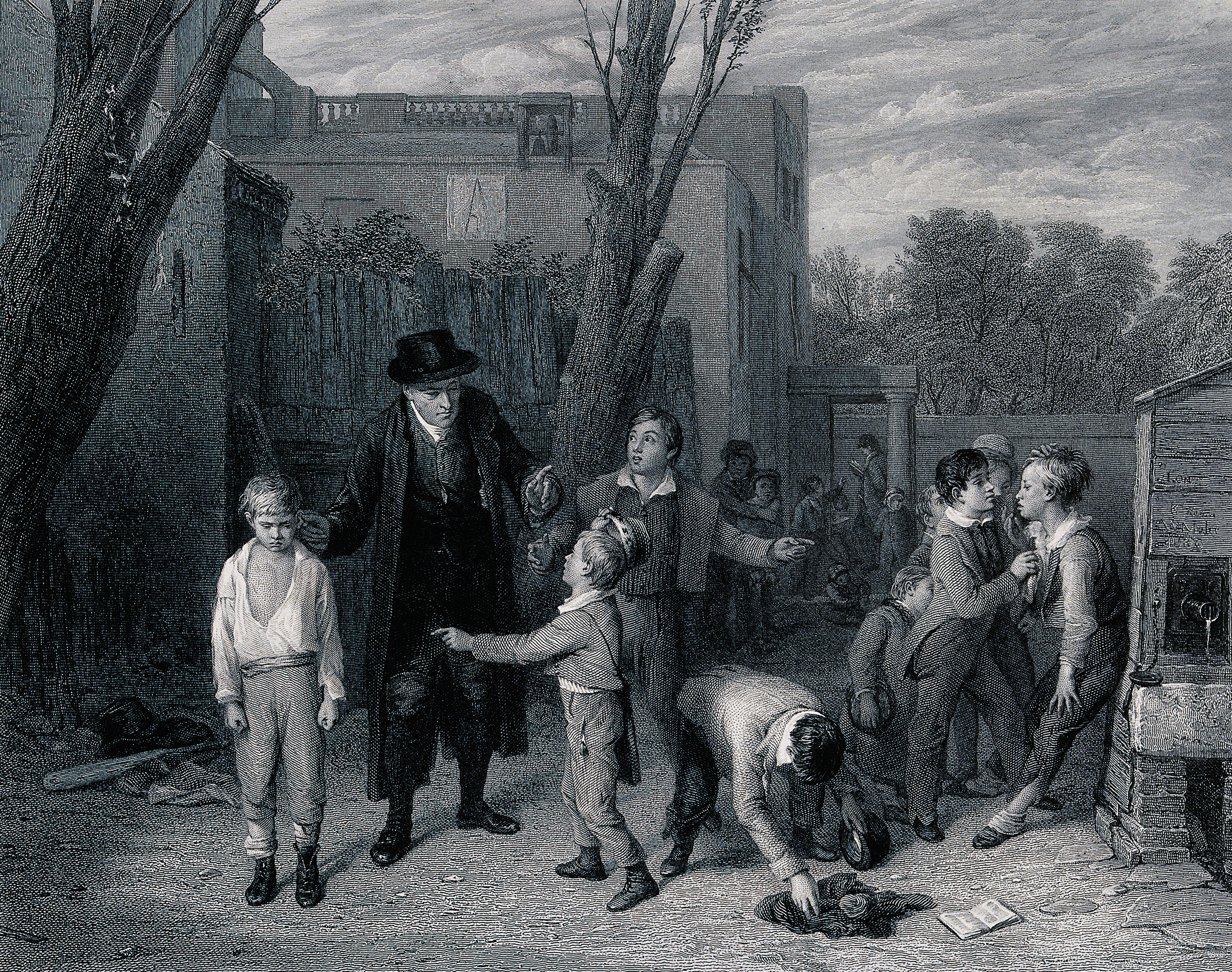
The Fight Interrupted after William Mulready

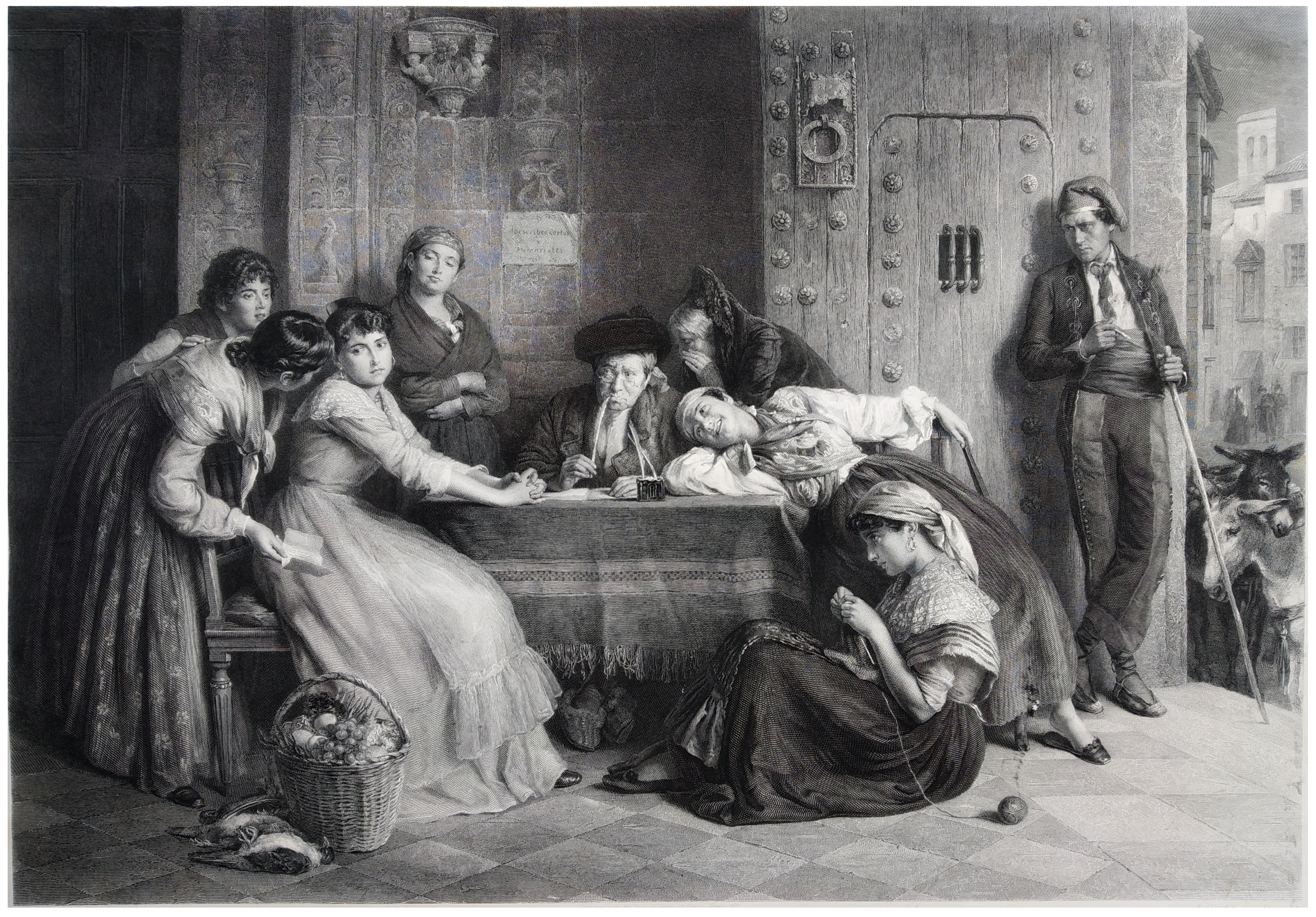
A Spanish Letter Writer after John Bagnold Burgess; printed by McQueen for the Art Union of London in 1888

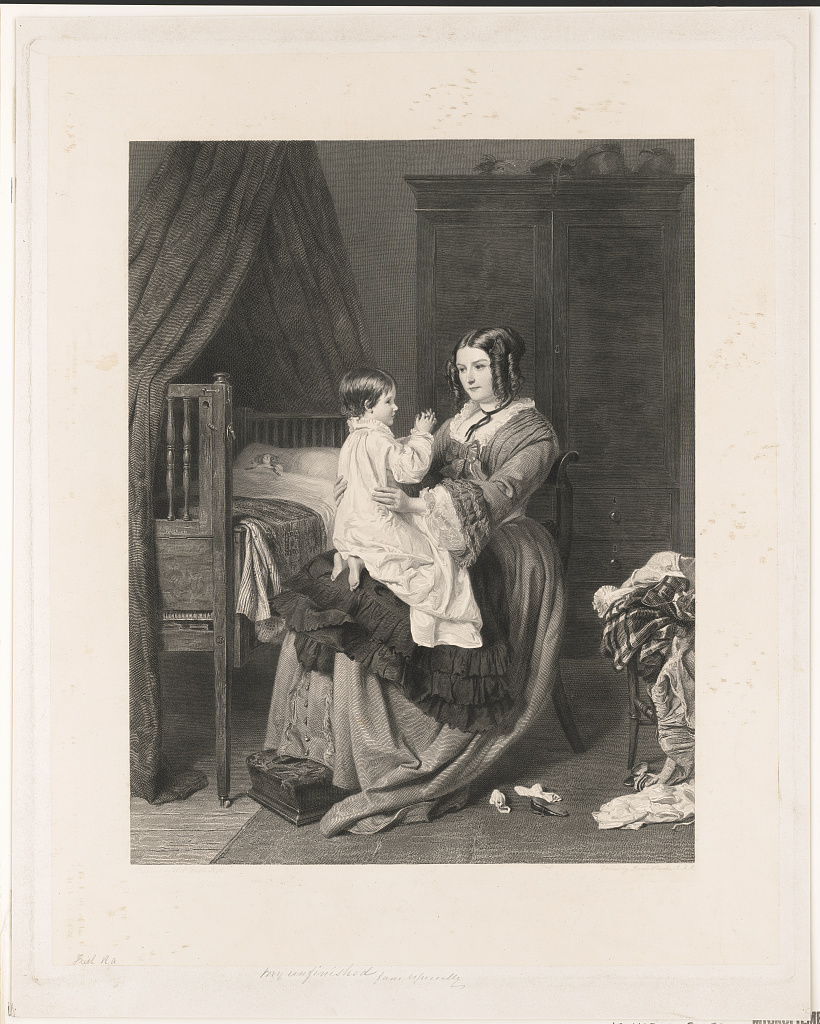
Mother & child at bedtime after W P Frith, R.A.

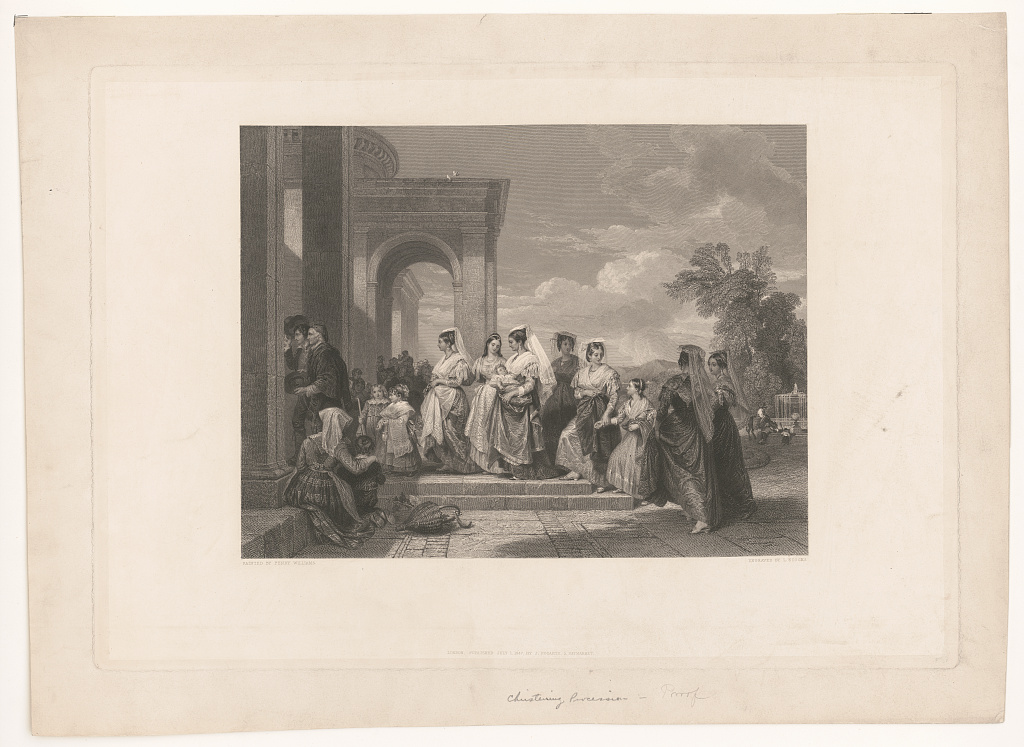
The Christening Procession after Penry Williams

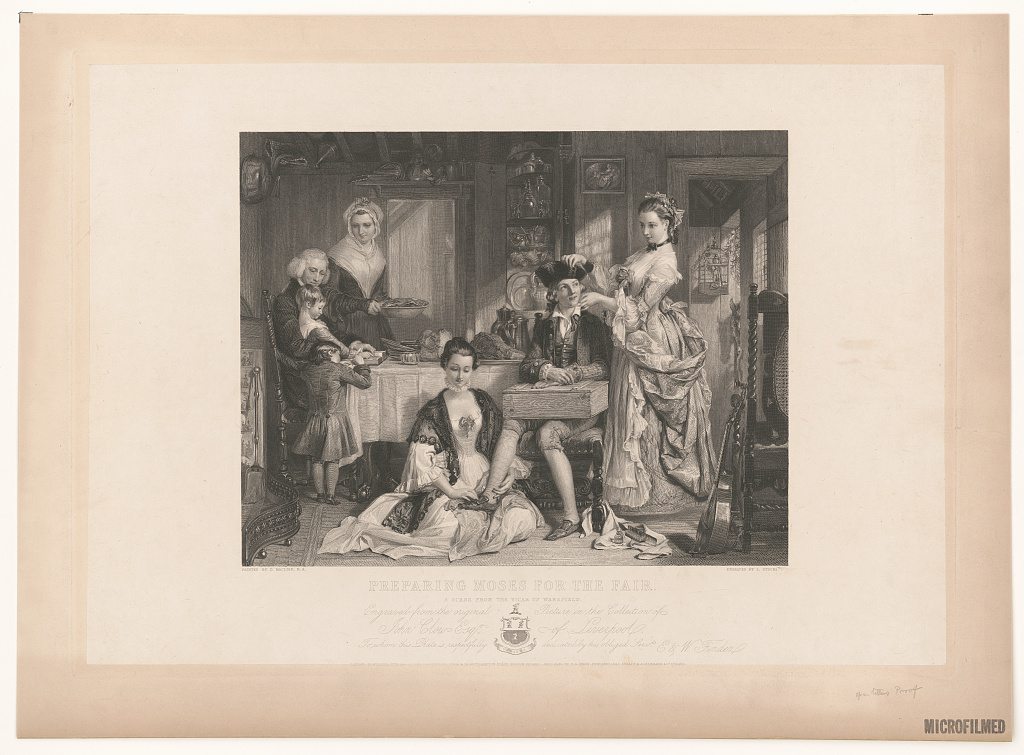
Preparing Moses for the fair. A scene from the Vicar of Wakefield after Daniel Maclise, R.A.

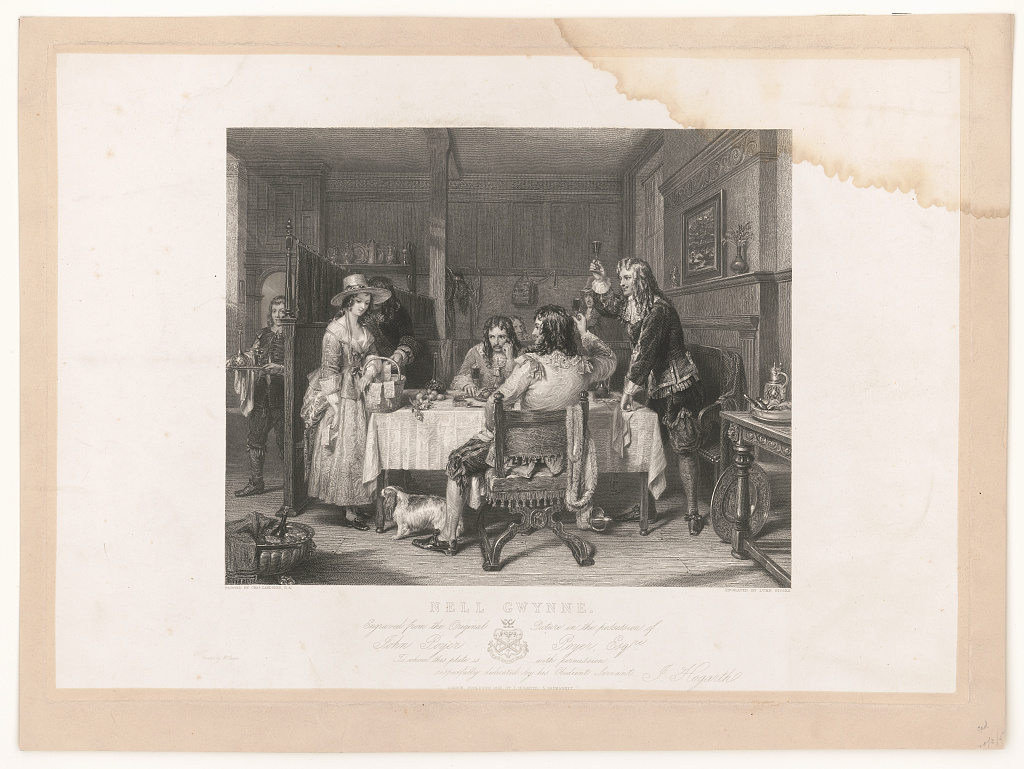
Nell Gwynne after Charles Landseer, R.A.

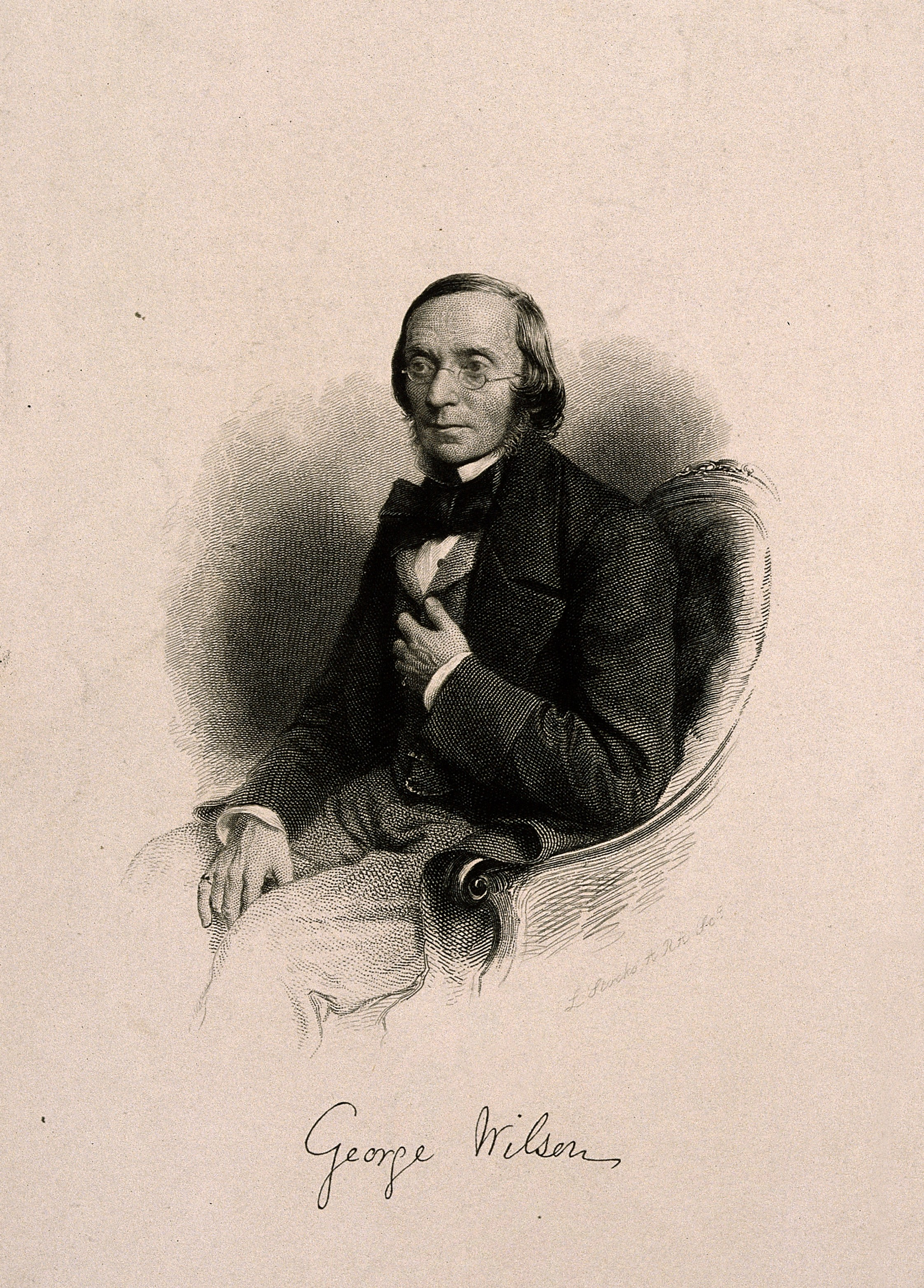
Portrait of the Scottish chemist George Wilson

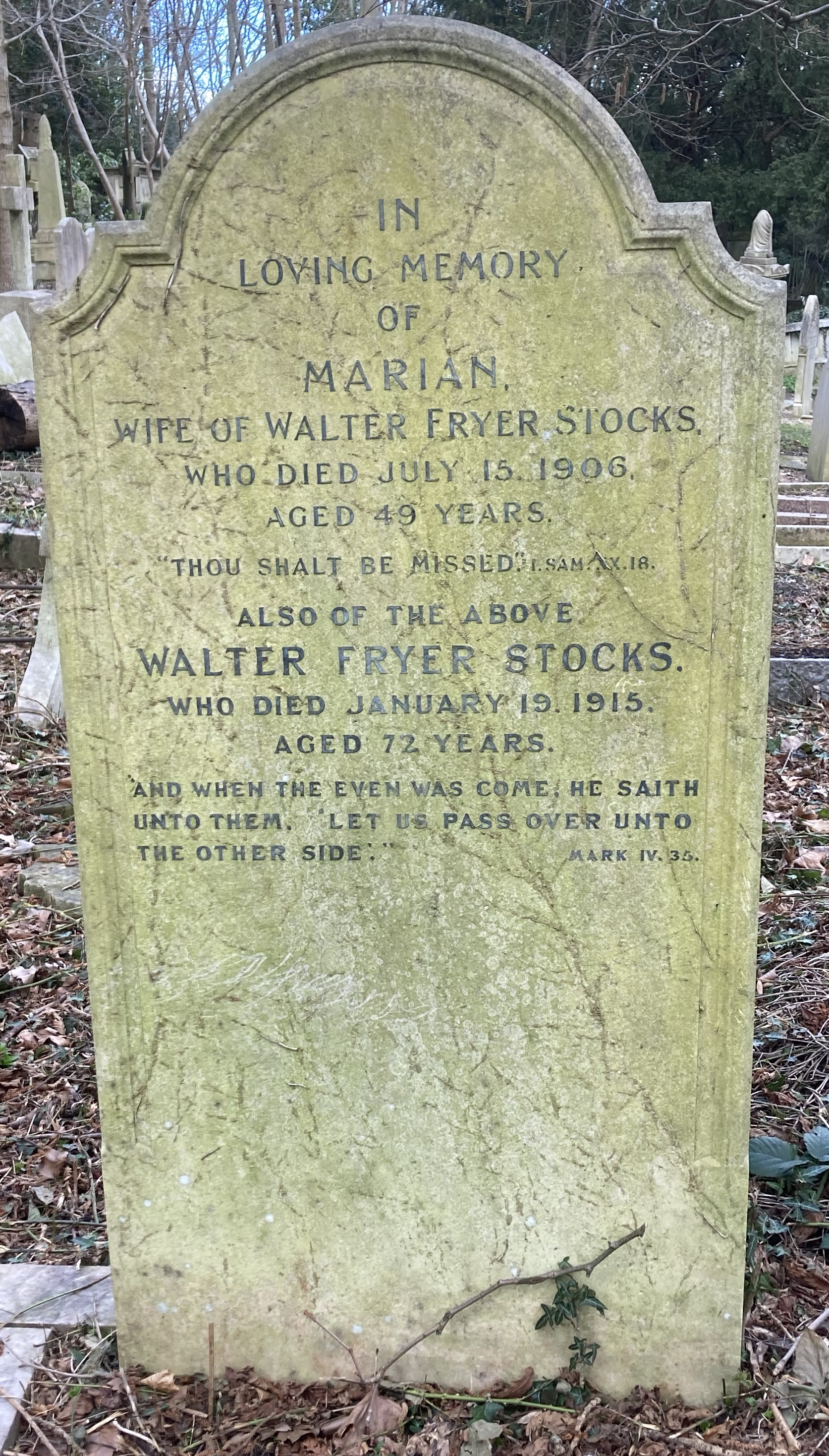
Grave of Walter Fryer Stocks in Highgate Cemetery (west side)
