= Benjamin Cosyn =

English organist and composer, c.1580–1653

Benjamin Cosyn (also Cosens, Cousins or Cowsins; c.1580 - bur. 14 September 1653) was an English composer, organist and virginalist. He was organist of St Laurence's Church, Ludlow (1621 to 1622), Dulwich College (1622 to 1624) and Charterhouse School (1626 to 1643).

He is best known compiling two valuable manuscripts of Tudor and Stuart-era music. The "Cosyn Virginal Book" (British Library R.M.23.L.4) dated 1620, collects keyboard music by Thomas Tallis, William Byrd, John Bull and Orlando Gibbons, as well as his own compositions. A 1652 manuscript "for the kings Royall chappell" (Bibliothèque nationale de France Rés.1185) collects 35 pieces by contemporary composers and 15 of his own.
