= William Turner Davey =

British artist and engraver

William Turner Davey (1818 – 25 July 1900) was a British artist and engraver who is best known for his reproductions of a number of celebrated Victorian works of art.

== Early life ==
Born in St Pancras, London, Davey was baptised on 17 January 1819 at St Pancras Old Church. He was the son of William Davey and Eliza Davey (formerly Lockyer), who were married in St Martin-in-the-Fields church on 14 September 1817; since a witness at the marriage was Elizabeth H. Turner, William may have been given his middle name of Turner after a relation or friend of that name.

Davey was a pupil of the engraver Charles Rolls (1799–1885).

== Career ==
It was Davey's reproductions of historical paintings which brought him to prominence: such as Eastward Ho! August 1857 by Henry Nelson O'Neil (showing British soldiers taking leave of their loved ones as they embark at Gravesend for India, in the wake of the Indian Mutiny), its companion Home Again, and the acclaimed large engraving in mixed mezzotint of Lady Butler's painting Return from Inkerman. He also exhibited 13 pieces at the Royal Academy between 1859 and 1884.

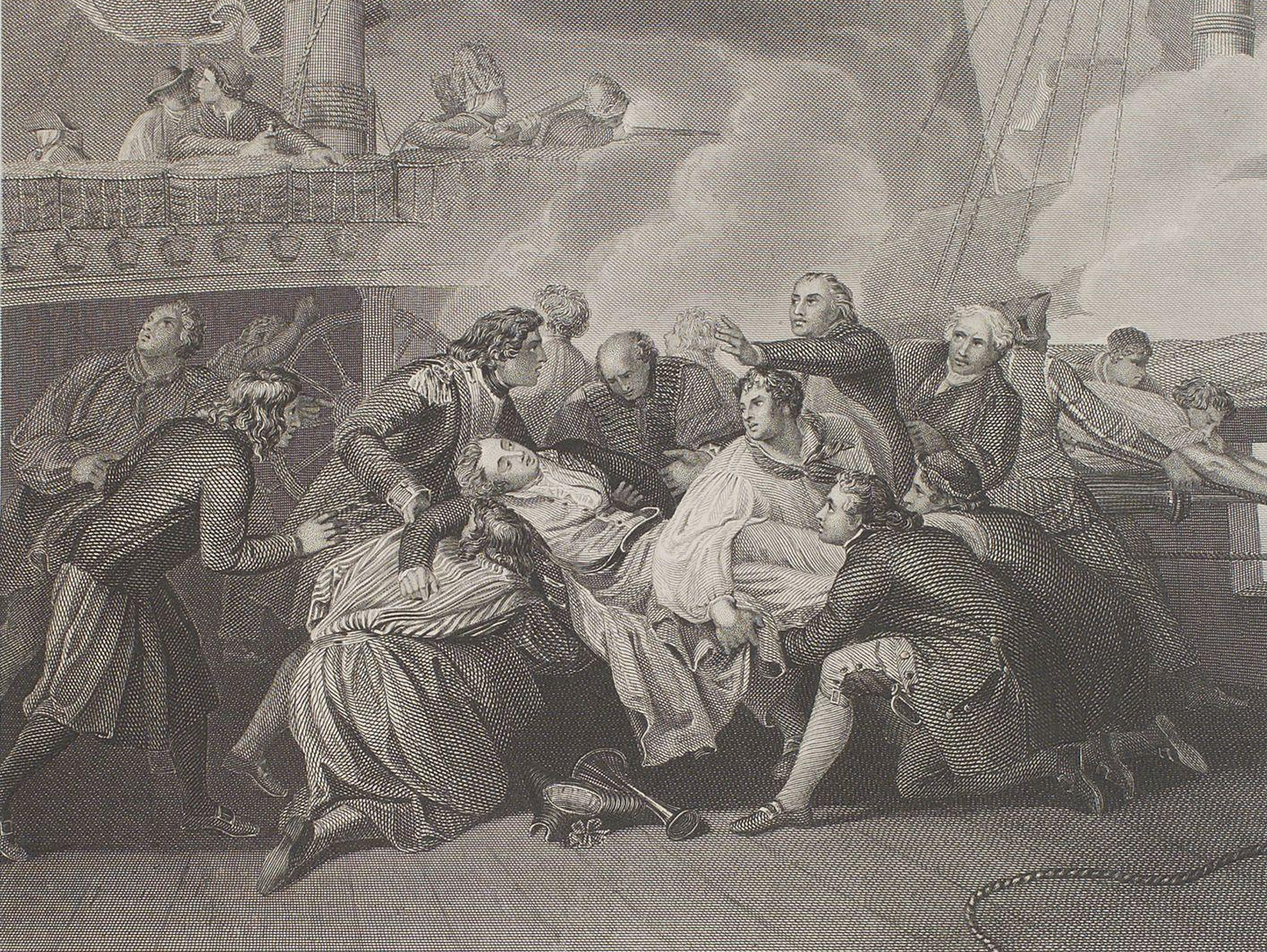
Death of Lord Robert Manners, engraving by William Turner Davey after Thomas Stothard

Among his many other works (a much fuller list appears in R. K. Engen's Dictionary of Victorian Engravers, Cambridge, 1979) are:

- The Pytchley Hunt, (after William and Henry Barraud, 1852);
- The Execution of the Marquis of Montrose (after Edward Matthew Ward, 1862);
- Morning (after W. C. T. Dobson);
- Keeper, a Good Dog in Old Times (after Landseer);
- The Fathers of the Pack (after William Barraud);
- Coming from the Fair (after Rosa Bonheur, 1876);
- The Wynnstay Hunt (after Henry Calvert);
- Autumn (after Alexander Johnston);
- Little Red Riding Hood (after Charles Baxter);
- The Casket (after Charles Baxter);
- The Wounded Hound (after Richard Ansdell);
- Deer Stalking (after Richard Ansdell);
- Pull's Ferry, Norwich (oil painting, 1891)

== Personal life ==
On 16 March 1840, Davey married Sarah Ann Barber at St John's Church in Holloway. They lived in north London until 1857 when they moved to Long Ditton, Surrey. William and Sarah had eight children, shown with them on the 1861 census in Portsmouth Road, Long Ditton. By 1871 William and Sarah had separated; Sarah is then living at 24 Andover Road, Hammersmith, with three of their children, while William is at 13 Mill Hill Terrace in Acton, Middlesex, living with another woman - Jane [Jane Law] - given as his 'wife'. From 1881 to 1888 William and Jane were living at 103 Mill Hill Road in Acton. By 1891 they had moved to 6 Florry Cottages in Ramsgate, Kent; William, then 72, is described in the census return as an 'artist, historical engraver/sculptor' and as being paralysed. One of his children: Frank Davey was a famous illustrator and photographer California and Hawaii.

William Turner Davey died in Ramsgate on 25 July 1900, aged 81.

== Bibliography ==
- R. Treble, Great Victorian Painters, 1978 pp. 62–63
- R. K. Engen, Dictionary of Victorian Engravers (Cambridge, 1979)
- Grove Dictionary of Art
