= Charles Rolls (engraver) =

British engraver (1799–1885)

- Born: 2 June 1799; Bermondsey, London
- Died: 9 November 1885 (aged 86); Penge, London
- Occupation: Engraver

Charles Rolls (2 June 1799 – 9 November 1885) was a British engraver of mainly historical and figurative artworks. In a long career he created engravings from paintings by many notable 19th century artists.

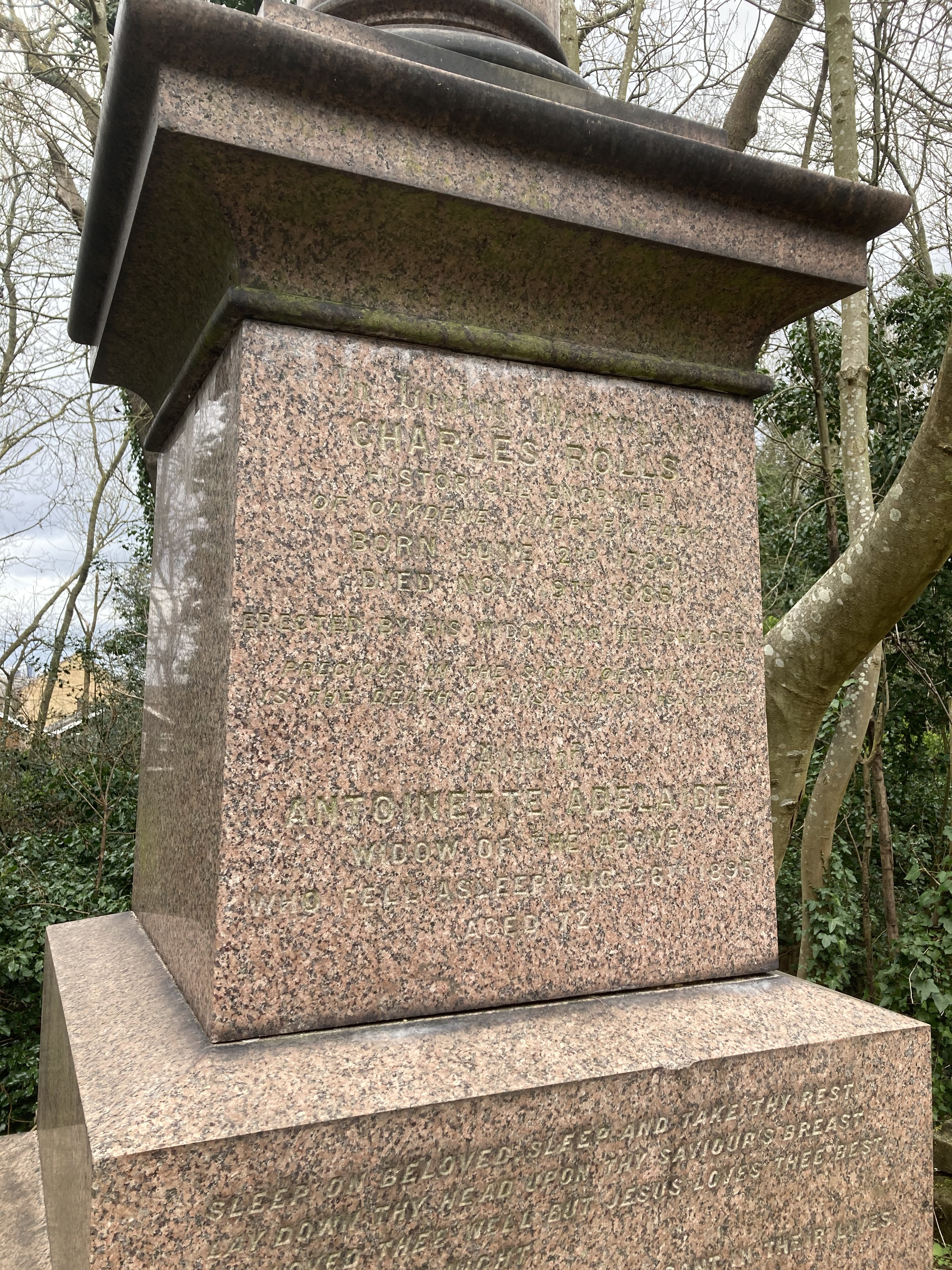
Grave of Charles Rolls in Nunhead Cemetery

== Biography ==
Rolls was born on 2 June 1799 in Grange Road, Bermondsey, London (then in Surrey) to non-conformist parents, William and Mary Rolls.

Early in his career, in 1823, he was proposed for the Artists' Annuity and Benevolent Fund, one of his sponsors being the engraver Francis Engleheart.

Most of Rolls work was for book-illustrations and he also worked for J S Virtue & Co, the publisher of The Art Journal.

The celebrated engravers William Turner Davey and Lumb Stocks were both apprenticed to Rolls, Stocks from 30 November 1826, with a ‘consideration’ of £315, paid by his father.

He died on 9 November 1885 at his home, Oakdene, South Laurie Park, Penge, London and is buried in Nunhead Cemetery.

== Gallery ==
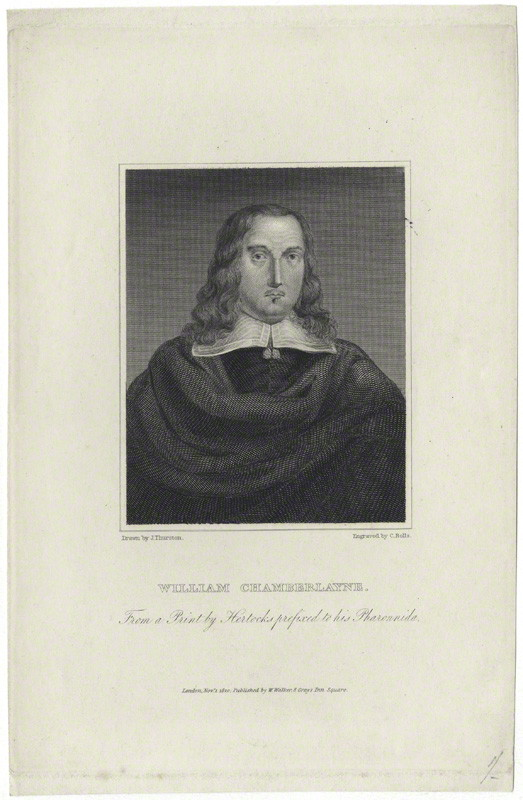
William Chamberlayne after John Thurston, after a 1699 engraving by A. Hertochs (Hertocks)

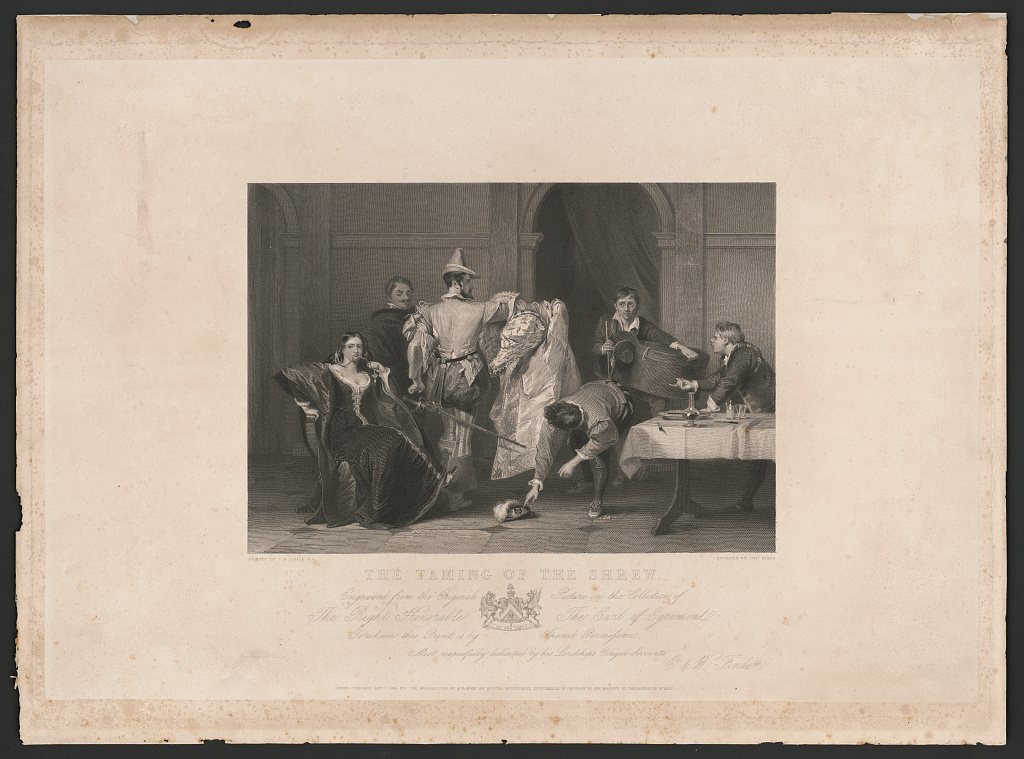
The taming of the shrew after C. R. Leslie, R.A.

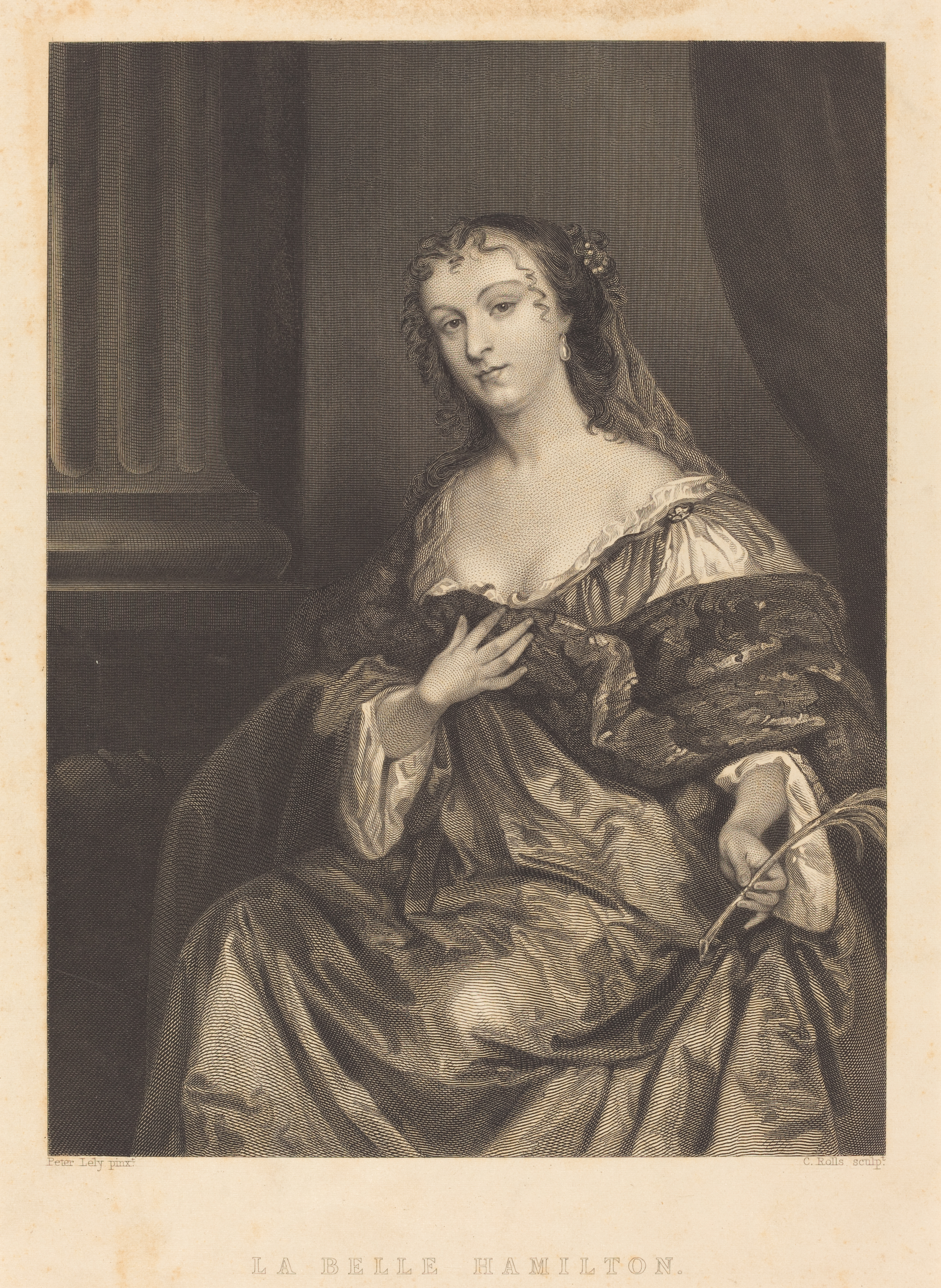
La Belle Hamilton after Sir Sir Peter Lely
