= St Laurence's Church, Ludlow =

Coordinates: 52°22′6″N 2°43′7″W

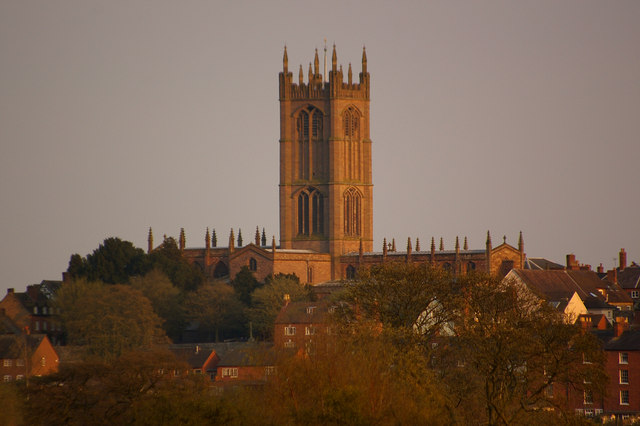
- St Laurence's Church, Ludlow
- OS grid reference: SO 51160 74712
- Country: England
- Denomination: Church of England
- Churchmanship: Liberal Catholic
- Website: stlaurences.org.uk

History
- Dedication: St. Laurence

Administration
- Province: Canterbury
- Diocese: Hereford
- Archdeaconry: Ludlow
- Deanery: Ludlow
- Parish: Ludlow St Laurence

St Laurence's Church, Ludlow, is a Church of England parish church in Ludlow, Shropshire, England. It is a grade I listed building.

The church is a member of the Greater Churches Group and is the largest parish church in Shropshire. It was one of only 18 churches given a five-star rating in England's Thousand Greatest Churches by Simon Jenkins (1999) and is described as the "cathedral of the Marches". It is the 13th most popular free visitor attraction in the West Midlands, with 70,000 visitors per year.

== Background ==
The parish church was established as a place of worship in association with the founding of Ludlow by the Normans in the late 11th century. It is situated atop the hill around which the medieval town developed. The church was rebuilt in the year 1199 and has had several later additions and modifications. The tower is 157 feet (48 metres) high to the top of the pinnacles, and commands expansive views of the town and surrounding countryside. Notable features include an extensive set of misericords in the choir stalls as well as fine stained glass windows.

== History ==
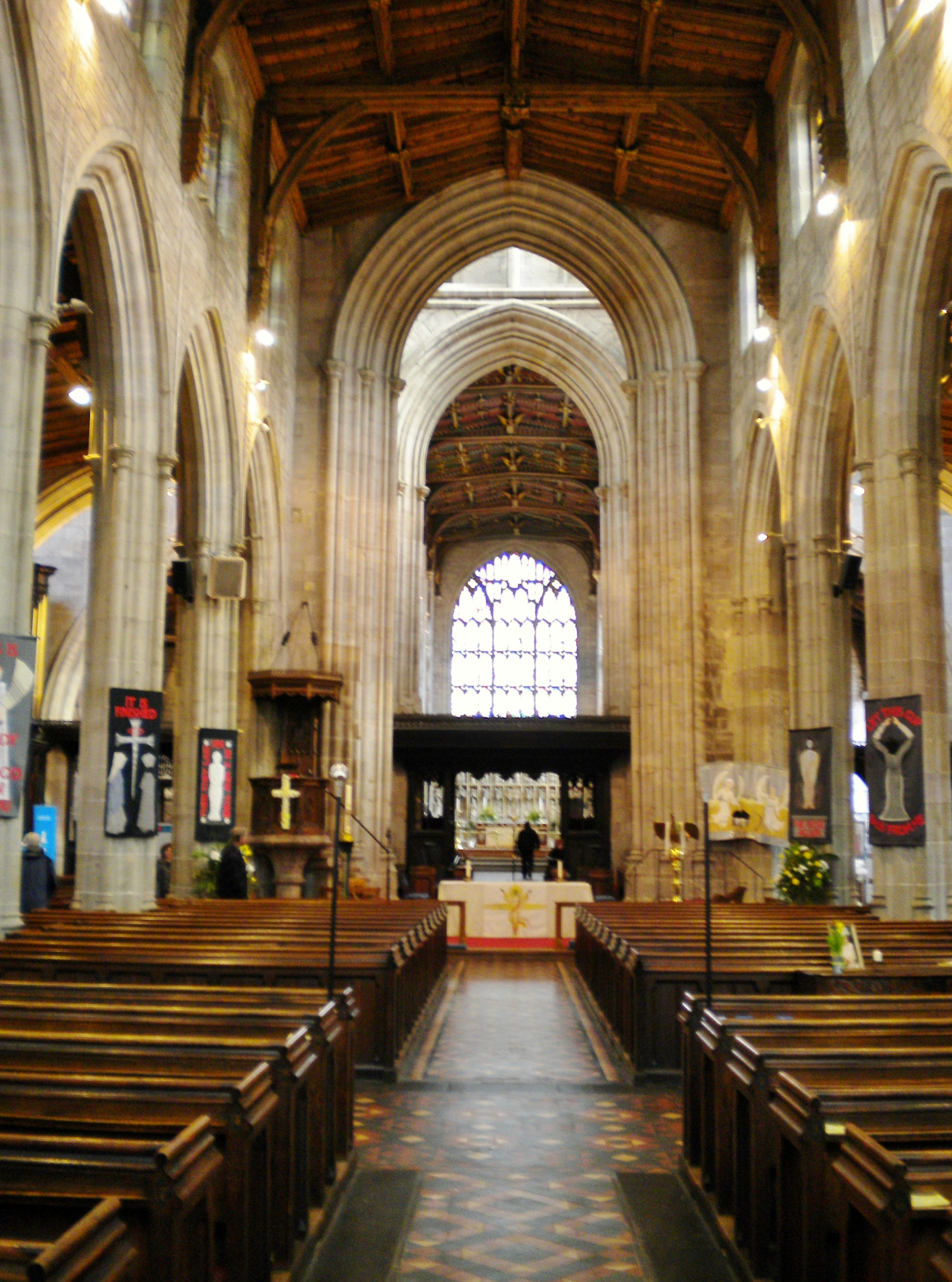
The interior looking east towards the chancel

Original Norman traces were found beneath the south porch, indicating some extant foundations exist from the 11th century AD. After its initial construction the church was expanded and rebuilt in 1199 to accommodate a growing town population. In the late Middle Ages considerable wealth accrued to the town based upon the wool trade. Correspondingly the church underwent several further additions in that era. The major works occurred between 1433 and 1471 with a virtual re-building of the nave, tower and chancel elements. The tower took on a Perpendicular style which was the preferred style of the late 15th century in England. The Saint John's Chapel on the north side was the chapel of the Palmers' Guild, which thrived in the Late Middle Ages. The Palmers' Window within St John's Chapel illustrates the legend of King Edward the Confessor and St John the Evangelist by eight panels and was inspired by the Ludlow Palmers' 13th century pilgrimage to the Holy Land.

In 1540, John Leland called the church "very Fayre and large and richly adorned and taken for the Fayrest in all these parts".

The large east window of the chancel underwent restoration in the year 1832; this window depicts the martyrdom of St Laurence. The most extensive repairs and re-ordering occurred in the period 1859 to 1861, which included new roofs, masonry glazing repairs as well as renewing all floors and seating. Further major restorations took place on the tower in 1889–1891, and to the roof in 1953–1959.

In 2008, a Vision for St Laurence's was launched to address much needed repairs and improve community use of the building. Approximately £850,000 of repairs and other work have been completed including urgent conservation, high level masonry, roofs, as well as new heating and lighting. Target 3, the re-ordering of the nave, will be tackled in two phases beginning in 2016. The nave will be reorganised with moveable seating and will be made available for wider community use. Phase 2 will include a new nave floor, kitchen, toilets, shop and other facilities as well as conservation to historic stained glass and timber.

== Architecture ==
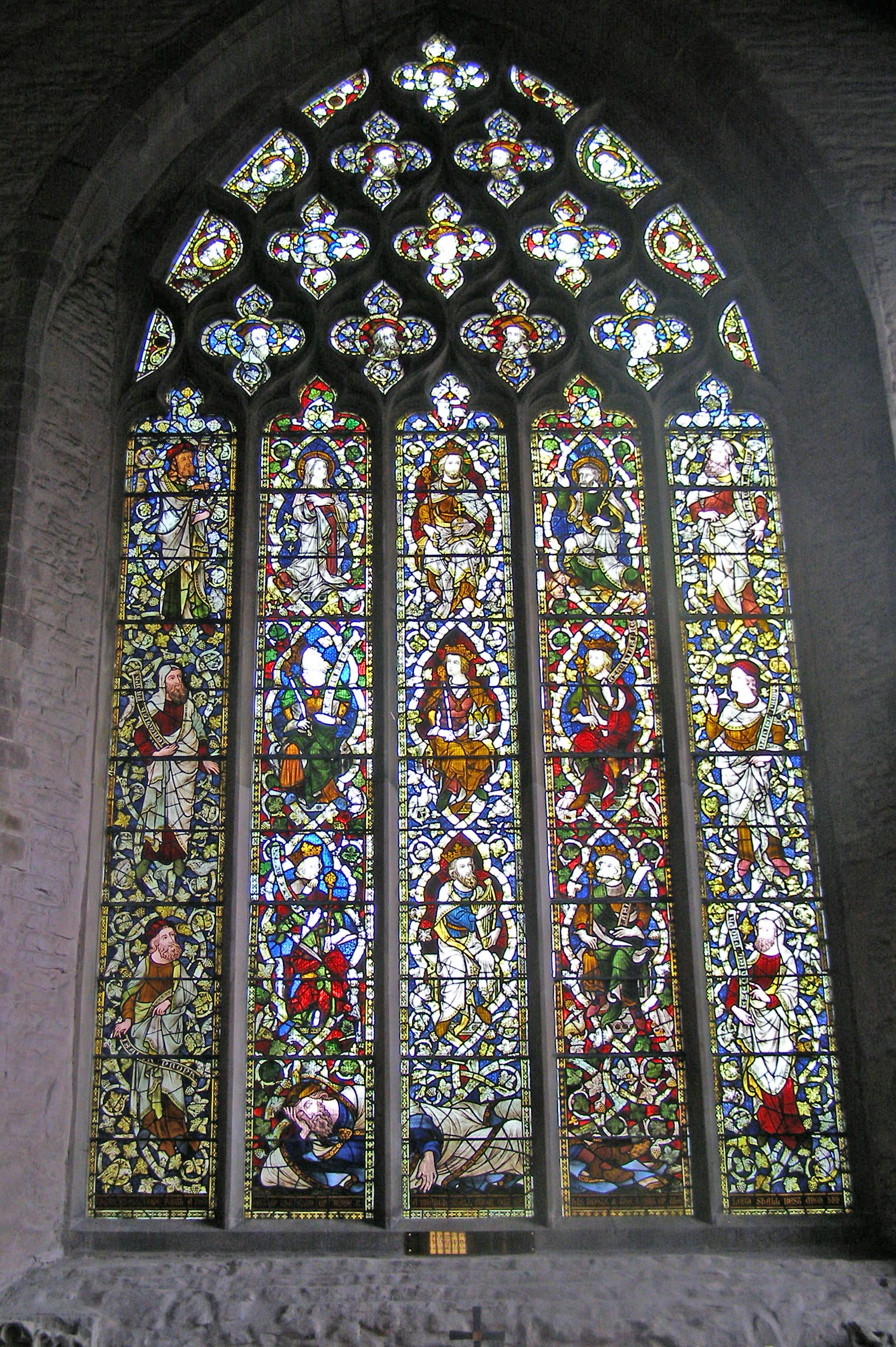
St Laurence's Church: one of the large stained glass windows

The dominant exterior feature is the square bell tower, which houses the historic and famed bells of the church. The chancel contains the medieval choir stalls adorned with numerous misericords. Many of these fine wood carvings are of heraldry and others are genre scenes of common life. Typical sizes of the misericords and upper bench carvings are 25 centimetres wide by 12 centimetres high; the carvings have very deep relief (up to two centimetres). Some of the elements of the carving are repeated on roof adornments.

The chancel has a number of monuments, most of which mark the graves of people involved with Ludlow Castle's Council of Wales and the Marches. Other than the large east window, there are other notable windows within the chancel; the most remarkable one depicts the Ten Commandments, the six remaining panels demonstrate commandments being broken.

The hexagonal south porch derives from the 14th century and serves as the main entrance to the church; this porch is one of only three of such a six-sided design in all of England. The other interior chapels are St Catherine's Chapel and the Lady Chapel, the latter of which has a large filled-in door that was once used for the Ludlow fire engine at an earlier era. Exterior features include a stone memorial tablet to the poet A. E. Housman (set in the north church wall near the West Door) and the Samuel Burgess Memorial Garden. Above the interior stone lantern there is a splendid vault.

== Notable burials ==
Following his death at Ludlow Castle in April of 1502, the bowels (called euphemistically "the heart") of Arthur, Prince of Wales, son of Henry VII and older brother of Henry VIII, were buried in a lead box in the choir but were noted in 1723 to have been taken up not long since. His body was buried at Worcester Cathedral.

Ambrosia Sidney, (1565–1574), sister of Sir Philip Sidney and Mary Sidney who died at Ludlow Castle, aged nine, is buried near the altar under an impressive memorial bearing the arms of Sir Henry Sidney, (1530–1586), president of the Council of Wales and the Marches. His heart was brought from Worcester where he died and buried in a small leaden urn in an oratory near his daughter's tomb. The rest of his remains were buried with his wife Mary Dudley at Penhurst, Kent.

Sir John Bridgeman (1568/69 – 1638), a Chief Justice of The Marches in the 17th century is buried in St Laurence's church, within a tomb monument attributed to Francesco Fanelli.

Admiral James Vashon is also buried at St Laurence's.

The ashes of poet A. E. Housman, whose poem "The Recruit" repeatedly mentions the church tower, are buried in the church grounds. The stump of a cherry tree (planted in memory) marks their location; a replacement cherry tree was planted nearby in 2003. The ashes of sculptor Adrian Jones are also buried in the church grounds, his memorial tablet is on the outside north wall near to that of Housman.

== Contents ==
=== Chancel stalls and misericords ===
St Laurence's Church has twenty-eight misericords in the chancel which are of a quality usually associated with great cathedrals such as Worcester or Gloucester. Carved on the underside of the hinged seats each misericord is fashioned from a piece of timber some 26 inches (660 millimetres) long, 12 inches (300 millimetres) deep and 6 inches (150 millimetres) thick. Sixteen of the misericords are older than the rest dating from around 1425. Eight have an unusual carvers mark in the form of an uprooted plant and a distinctive profile to the moulding running round the edge of the corbel. The remainder were carved in matching style around 1447 which was when the Palmers Guild bought one hundred planks of oak from Bristol to construct the stalls.

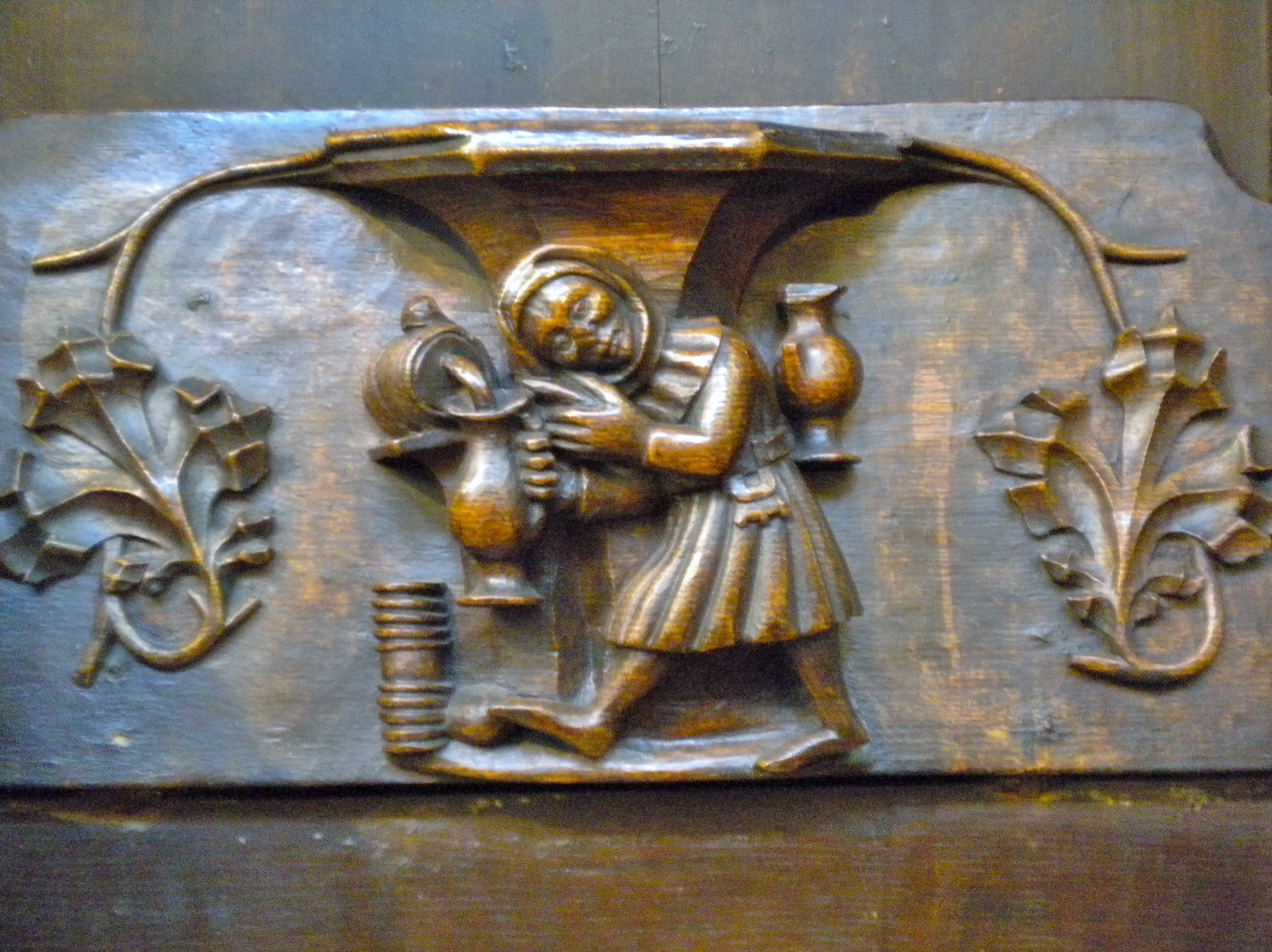
A drawer of ale

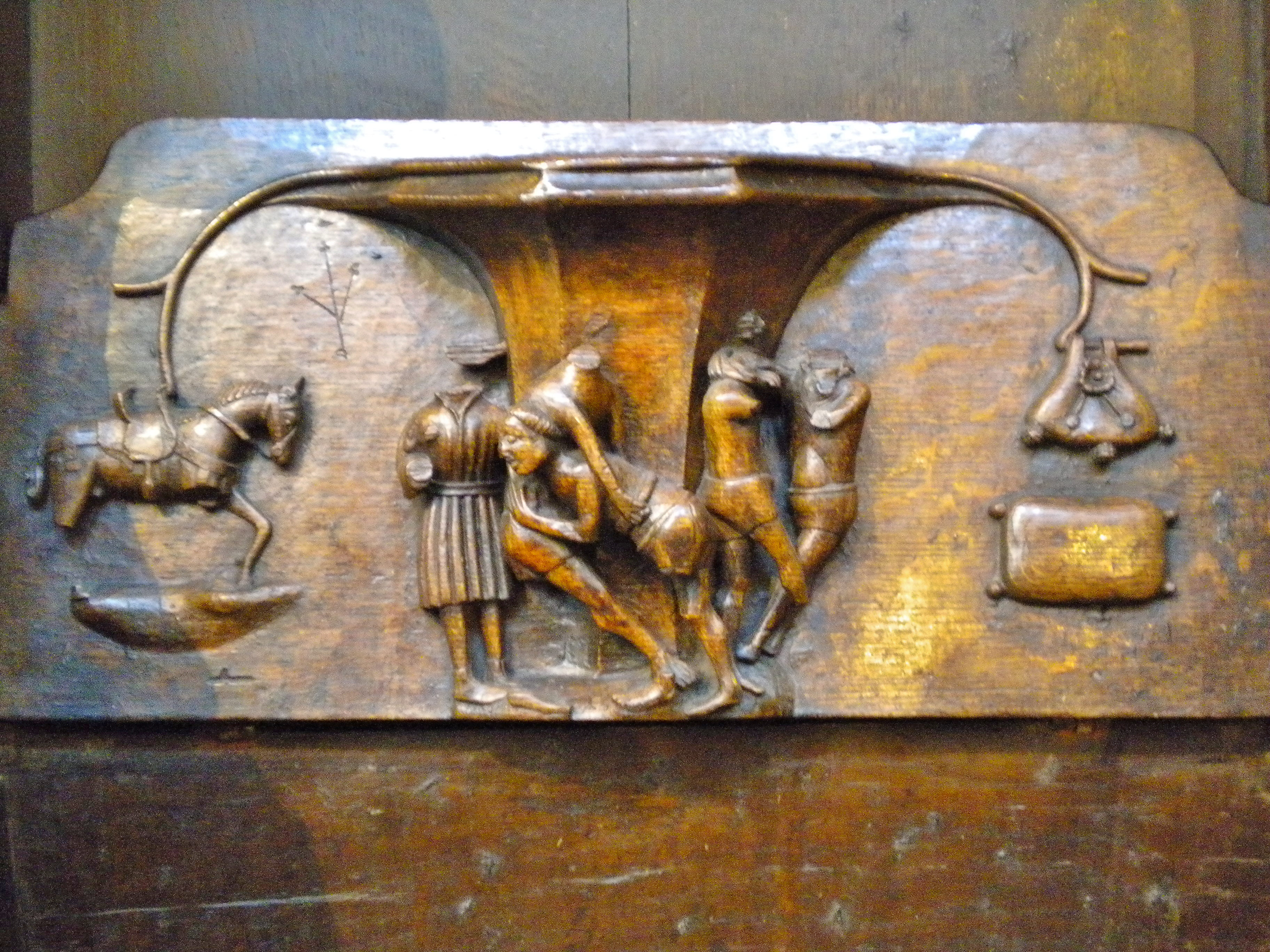
Wrestlers

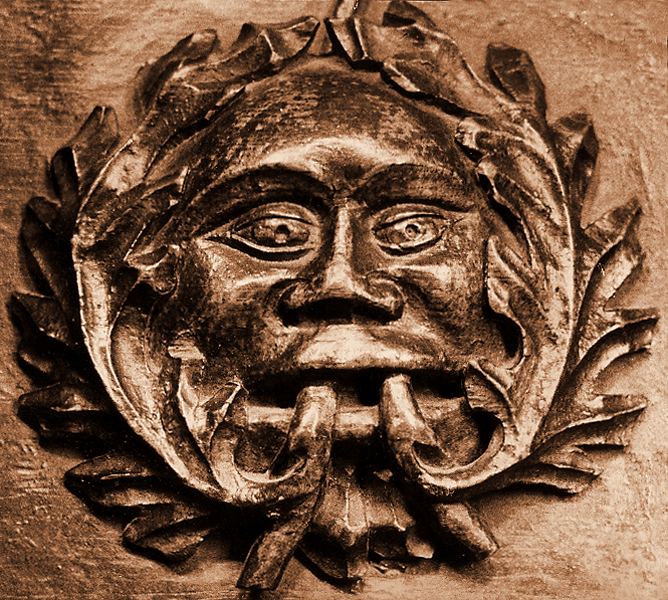
Detail of a Green Man

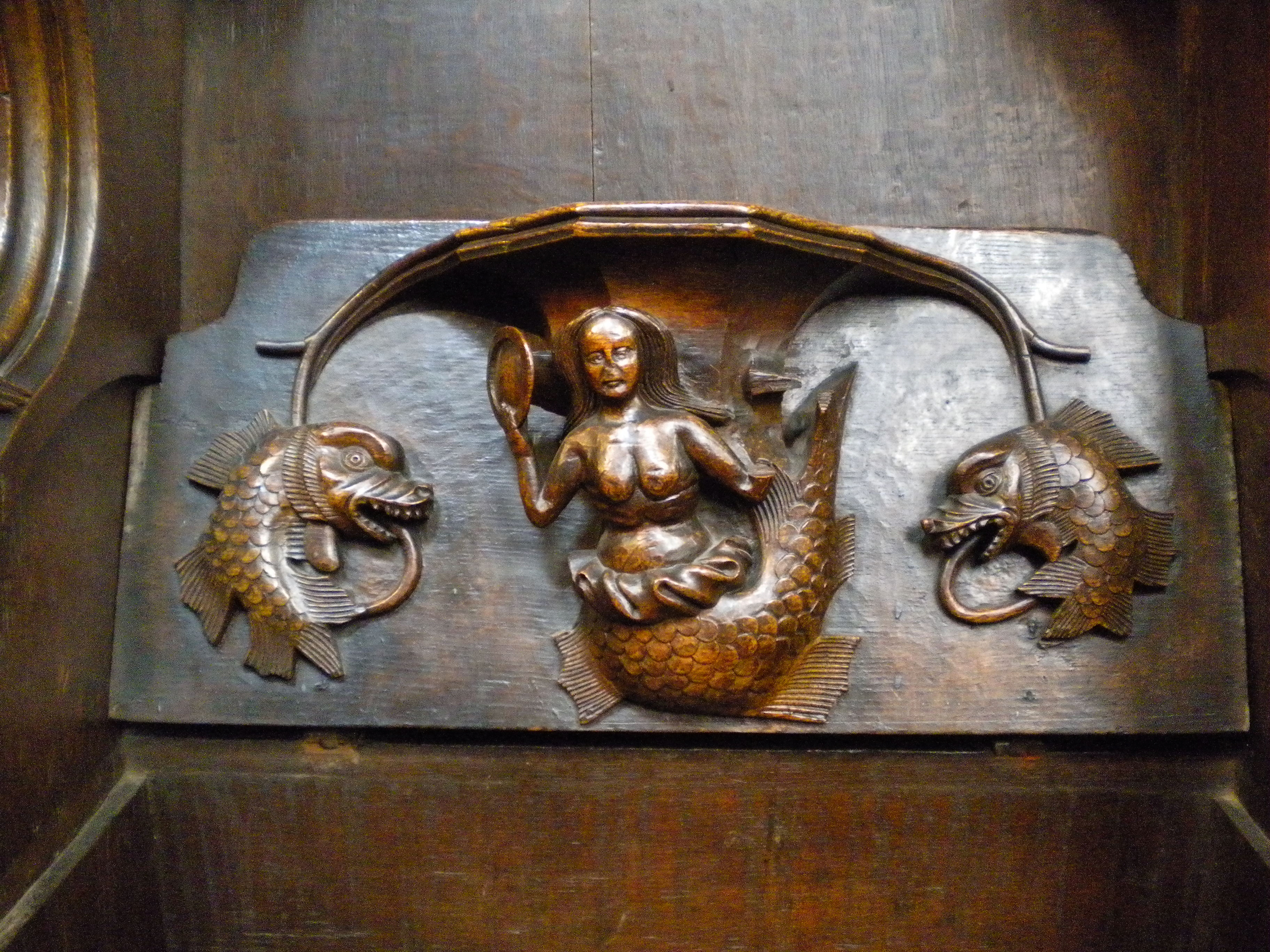
A mermaid

The misericords have a wide variety of themes. One shows a Green Man, another a mermaid. Many show scenes of town life including a wrestling match where two pairs of wrestlers are stripped to the waist while a horse is tied up on one side and a wool sack and a purse hang on the other. One shows a figure drawing ale from a cask and another shows a dishonest ale-wife being carried off to hell by demons, one of whom plays bagpipes. One complex carving shows a prosperous householder with tools of various trades in the centre while a seated woman holds a child on the left and a grave and burial implements are on the right. This has been interpreted as the Palmers Guild caring for spiritual needs from cradle to grave.

Ludlow then being a royal stronghold there is a royal influence shown in a number of misericords. An antelope, gorged and chained, was the badge of Henry VI in whose reign the misericords were carved. A Hart at Rest was the badge of Richard II and three ostrich feathers were then recognised as the badge of Richard's father the Black Prince. A swan represents the Bohun family and through Mary de Bohun's marriage to Henry IV passed to Henry V and Henry VI.

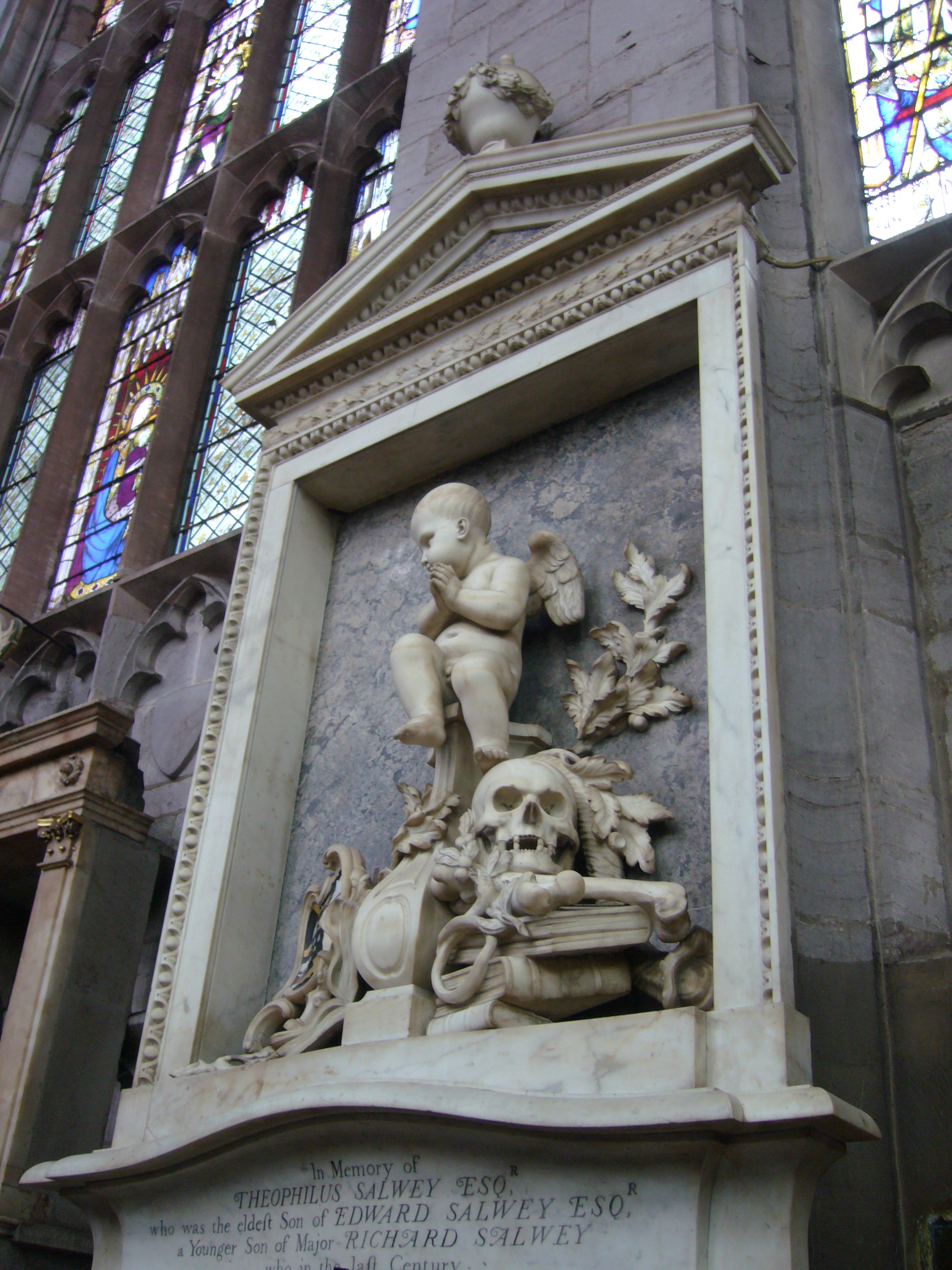
18th-century tomb inside the church

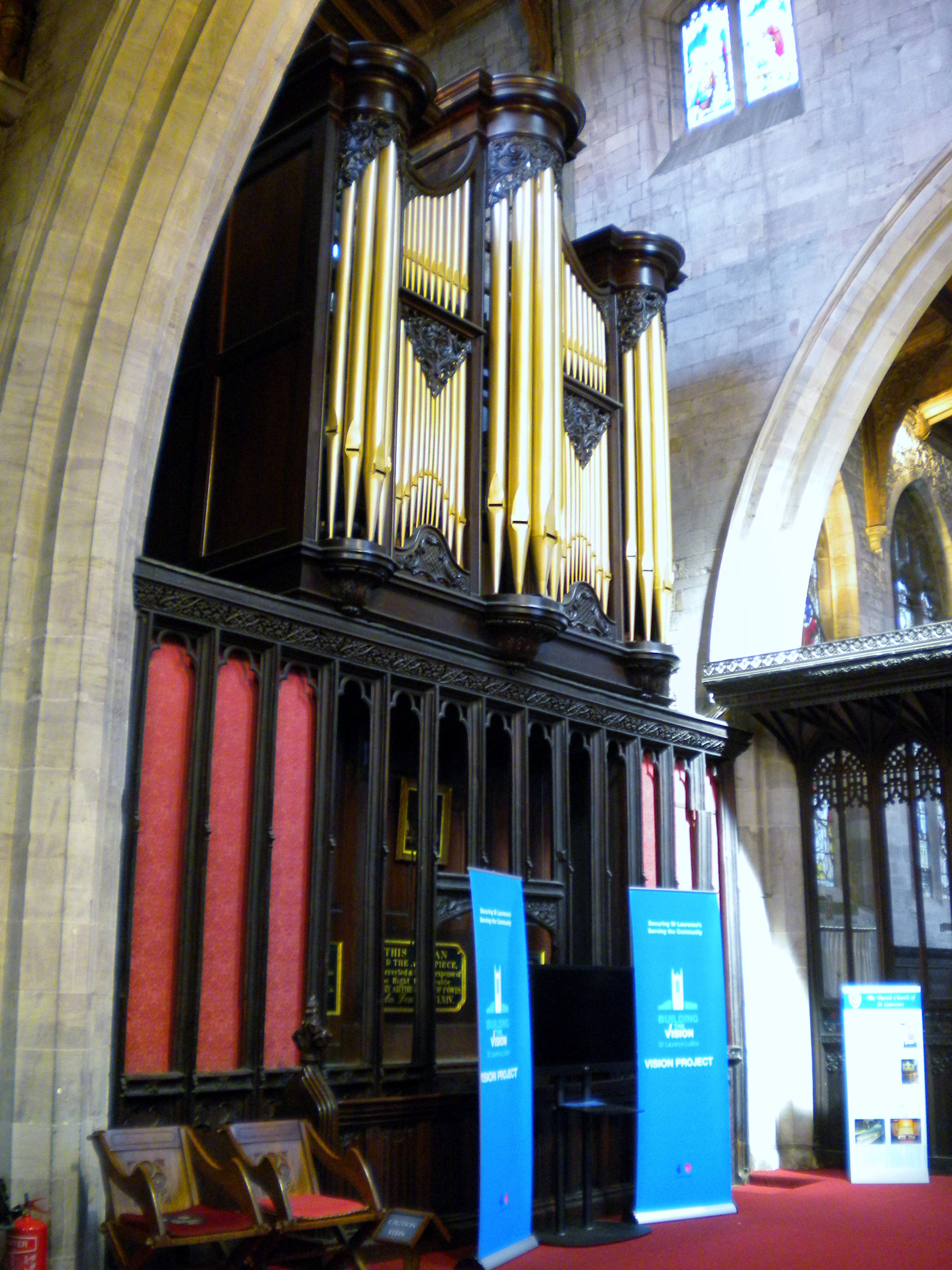
The organ

The choir stalls were originally constructed at a number of dates in the 15th century. In 1447, after the chancel had been lengthened, the stalls were doubled in number to thirty two. The stalls were restored in the 19th century under the direction of George Gilbert Scott when canopies removed during the reformation were replaced. The poppyheads are finely carved with four being from 1447. Carved figures include a Pietà, one of only two known in Shropshire, and various saints. One group possibly represents a Boy Bishop and Lord of Misrule involved in new year celebrations.

=== Porch ===
Above the porch on the first floor is the Parvis room, which houses a small history museum pertinent to the church. The porch itself contains the parish war memorial, consisting of six bronze plaques listing townsmen who died serving in World War I, with deaths from World War II and the Korean War added later in turn, and three wooden 'battlefield crosses' that temporarily marked graves of two soldiers killed in World War I and a sailor who died in 1921.

=== Nave and aisles ===
At St. Catherine's Chapel (the south transept) some floor-stones in the area honour recent congregation members. In the Lady Chapel is a board giving the Ten Commandments, dating from the time of Elizabeth I during the English Reformation.

In the nave and aisle area, there are several noteworthy contents, including:

- The royal English coat of arms from the year 1628.
- Wall hanging: A Shropshire Lad located near the south door.
- The west window of nave, illustrating some of the historical figures involved with Ludlow Castle.
- The White Ensign from HMS Ludlow.

== Organ ==
In the north transept is the John Snetzler organ. Through the generosity of Henry Arthur Herbert, 1st Earl of Powis, this organ was installed in 1764 at a cost of £1,000. Originally it was located in a gallery beneath the tower and had three manuals with 19 stops.

In the 19th century, Gray and Davison restored the organ and enlarged it, at the same time moving it to its present position in the north transept. By this time, a fourth manual had been added.

The organ was restored in the 1980s by Nicholson & Co (Worcester) Ltd.

In 2006, thanks largely to a grant from the Heritage Lottery Fund, further work was carried out to clean the instrument, improve the console, and to add a new mounted cornet. More recent work has included new keyboards and toe sweep, as well as overhauling the blowing plant and gilding the facade pipes.

=== List of organists ===
- Edmund White c. 1473
- Thomas Sherman 1492–1508
- John Perche c. 1493
- Maurice Phillips c. 1551
- John Broke c. 1549 – 1559
- Thomas Tanner c. 1566
- Thomas Cope 1568–1579
- John Cooke 1578–1583
- John Harrison 1584–1597
- George Pingle 1597–1604
- Richard Crumpe 1605–1620
- Benjamin Cosyn 1621–1622
- Mr. Perkings 1623
- Marmaduke Pardoe 1623–1626
- Walter Gibbs 1626–1628
- Edward Smith 1627–1630
- Edward Standley 1630–1634
- John Maylard 1634–1635
- Berkeley Wrench 1636–1637 (then organist of Gloucester Cathedral before reappointment in 1642).
- John ap Evan 1638
- Thomas Heardson 1637–1642
- Berkeley Wrench 1642–1645
- interregnum 1645–1672
- Benjamin Moone 1672–1704
- Henry Hall 1704–1707
- William Hine 1707
- Josias Preist 1708–1711
- John Childe 1711–1712
- John Salter 1712–1713
- Benjamin Sharrett 1713–1716
- David Langton 1716–1730
- David Valentine 1730–1764
- Joseph Harris 1764–1771 (then organist of St Martin in the Bull Ring, Birmingham)
- Miles Coyle 1771–1789 (then organist of Hereford Cathedral)
- John Clarke Whitfield 1789–1794 (later organist of St Patrick's Cathedral, Armagh (Church of Ireland))
- Charles Evans 1794–1823
- Adam Ree 1823–1841 – 1851–1856
- Miss Francis Ree 1856–1858
- William Walter Ridley 1858
- Robert Bartholomew 1858–1891
- Joseph Humphrey Anger 1892–1893 (then Instructor of Harmony and Theory at the Royal Conservatory of Music, Toronto)
- Ivor Atkins 1893–1897 (then organist of Worcester Cathedral)
- Clement Charlton Palmer 1897–1908 (then organist of Canterbury Cathedral)
- Norman Charles Woods 1908–1911 (then organist of St. Michael's College, Tenbury)
- Harold Carpenter Lumb Stocks 1911 –1917 (then organist of St Asaph Cathedral)
- Frank Edgar Bastick 1917 – c. 1921 – 1948
- Edgar Sydney Landen 1948–1951
- Gilbert W. Whitehouse 1951–1970
- Richard J. E. Francis 1971–1974
- George Baker 1974–1976
- Keith Anthony Morgan 1976–1978
- Morwen Byram-Wigfield 1978–1980
- Richard J. E. Francis 1980–2007
- Shaun Ward 2007–2019
- Michael Oakley 2019–present

== List of rectors ==
The senior priest and incumbent of the parish is titled the Rector.

- The Reverend Prebendary John Baulch (1984 to 1993)
- The Reverend Prebendary Brian Curnew (1994 to 2009)
- The Venerable Colin Williams (2010 to 2015)
- The Reverend Kelvin Price (May 2017 to present); Priest-in-Charge and Rector

== See also ==
- Grade I listed churches in Shropshire
- Listed buildings in Ludlow (northern area)
- Bishop of Ludlow
- Archdeacon of Ludlow
- Wool church
- Fulk FitzWarin
