= Walter Fryer Stocks =

English painter (1842–1915)

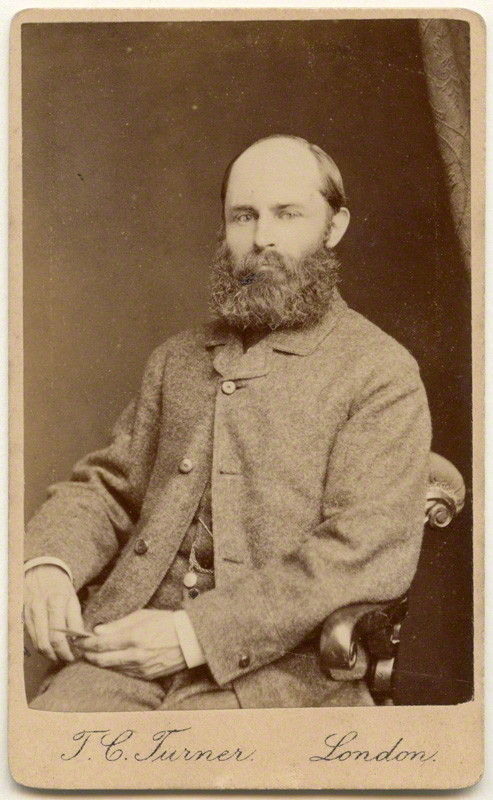
- Stocks in the 1870s
- Born: 1842; London
- Died: 19 January 1915 (aged 72–73)
- Resting place: Highgate Cemetery
- Spouse: Marian Hill

Walter Fryer Stocks (1842–1915) was an English artist.

== Life ==
Walter Fryer Stocks was the second son of nine children (eight sons and a daughter) of the engraver Lumb Stocks (1812–1892) and Ellen Fryer (1813–1898). Walter's younger brother, Arthur Stocks (1846–1889), was also a painter whose works were exhibited at the Royal Academy and elsewhere. His only sister, Katherine Mary (1844–1908), was an exhibited painter of flowers and his youngest brother, Bernard Octavius (1859–1915), was a still life painter and mezzotint engraver.

Walter was a highly skilled and prolific painter best known for his landscapes, topographical views and scenes of ancient buildings, as well as a series of still-life studies.

He had a close artistic association and friendship with the great Pre-Raphaelites, including Simeon Solomon and Dante Rossetti. Walter's portrait in red, white and black chalks of the captivating Jamaican-born beauty Fanny Eaton, a celebrated and feted artist's muse for the Pre-Raphaelite brotherhood, is now in the collection of the Princeton University Art Museum.

Stocks exhibited extensively during his lifetime and some of his works are now hanging in the Victoria and Albert Museum and the British Museum, as well as other galleries.

He married Marian Hill on the 8 January 1883 and they had one son, the organist and composer Harold Carpenter Lumb Stocks (1884–1956).

Walter Fryer Stocks died on 19 January 1915 and is buried with his wife Marian in the west side of Highgate Cemetery, close to the family grave of his father Lumb, mother Ellen and brothers Arthur, Bernard and Charles.

== Gallery ==
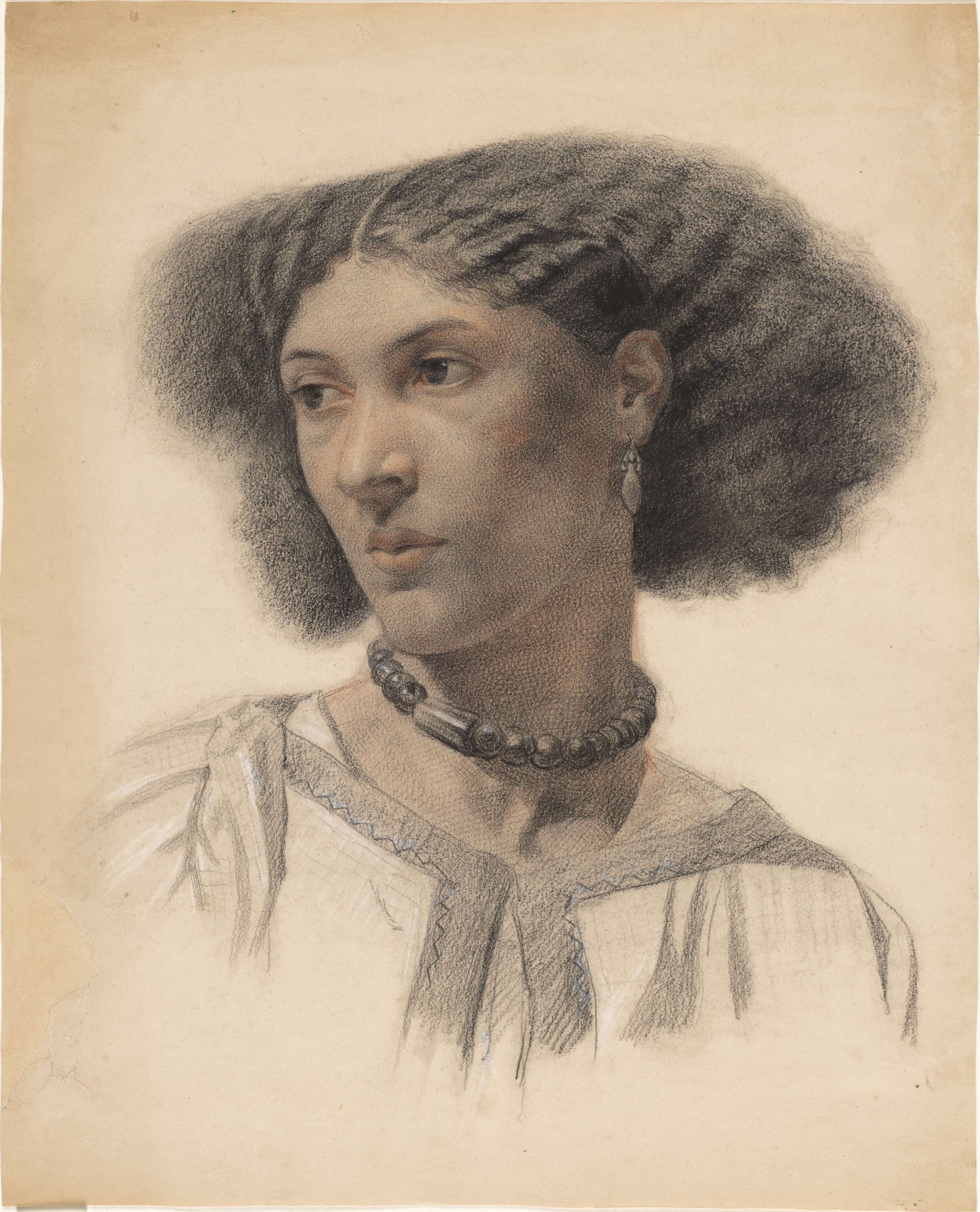
Portrait of Fanny Eaton by Walter Fryer Stocks

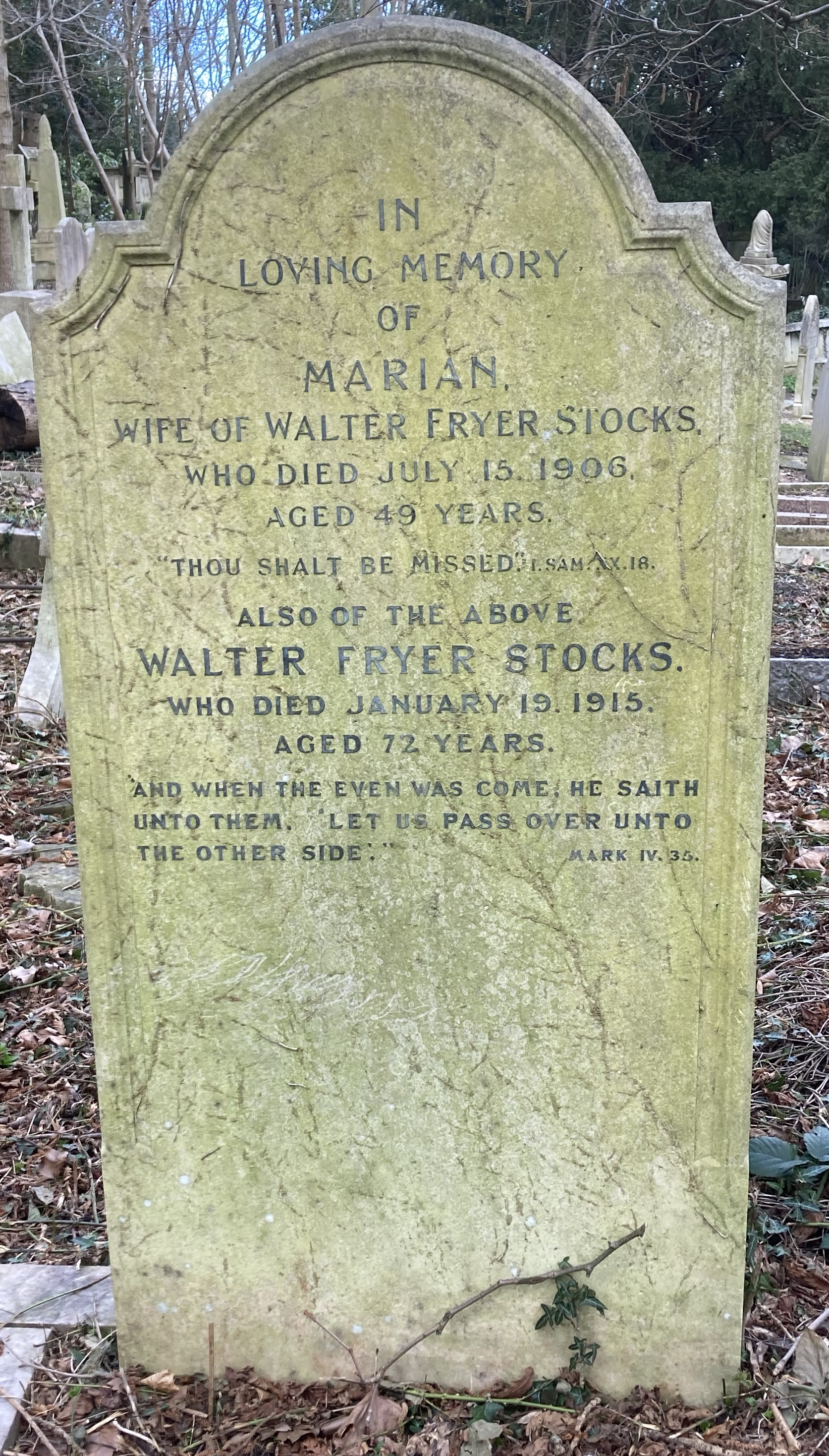
Grave of Walter Fryer Stocks in Highgate Cemetery (west side)

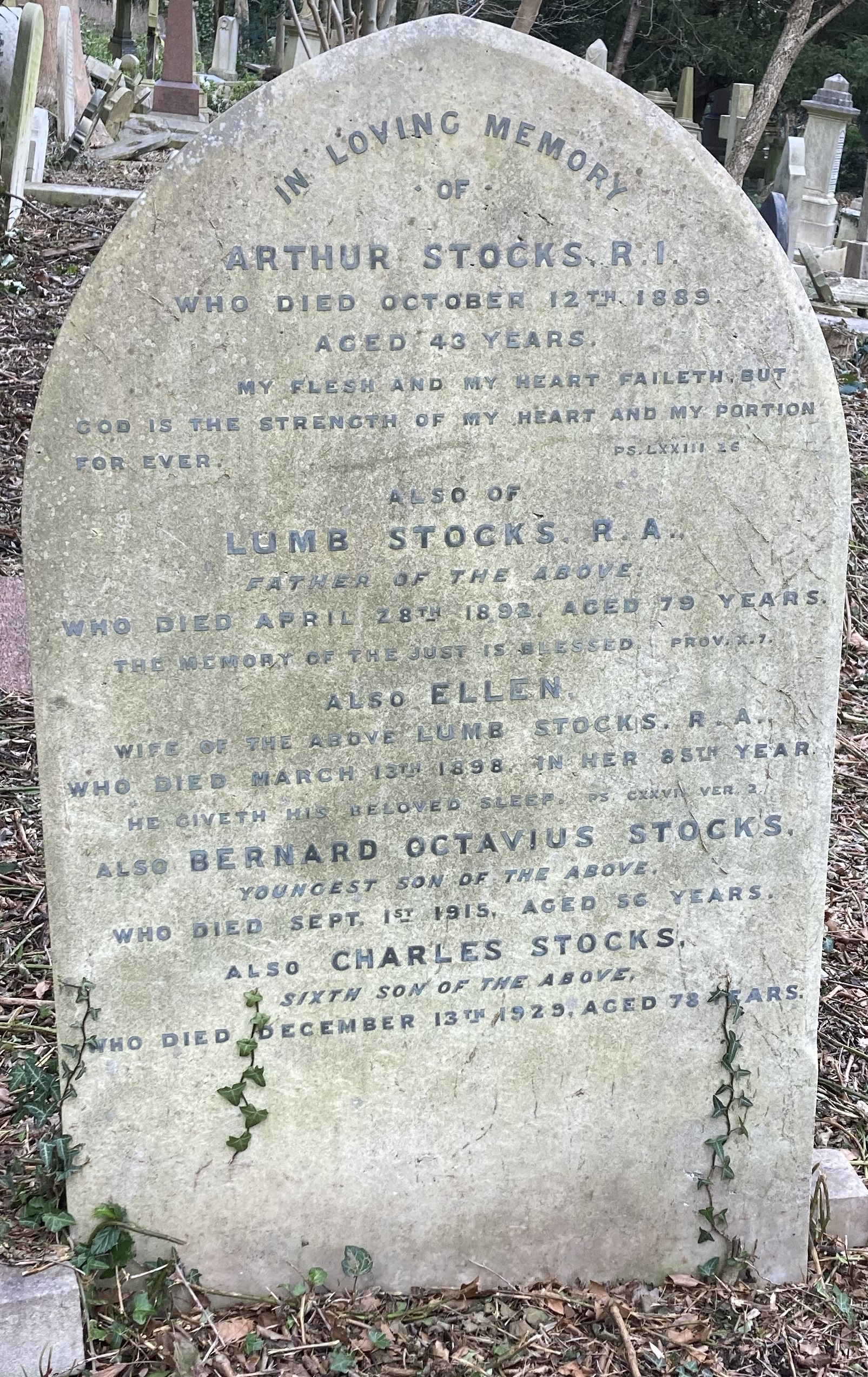
Family grave of Lumb Stocks in Highgate Cemetery (west side)
