= Joseph Harris (organist) =

English composer and organist, died 1814

Joseph Harris (1743–1814) was a composer and organist based in Ludlow and then Birmingham.

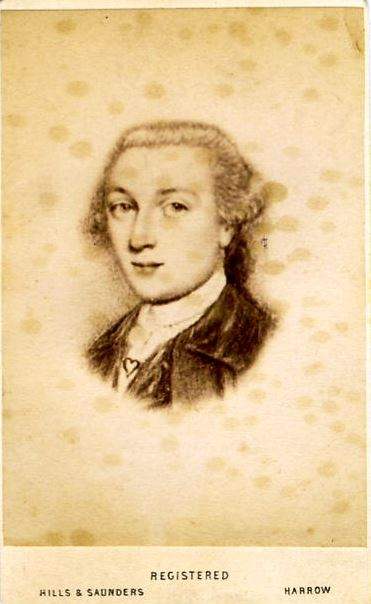
Sketch of Joseph Harris.

== Life ==
He was born in Bristol, son of John and Mary Harris, on 8 September 1743 and baptised in St Nicholas Church, Bristol on 8 October 1743.

He matriculated at Magdalen College, Oxford on 16 March 1773, and graduated B.Mus. 24 March 1779, whilst organist at Ludlow Parish Church. He compiled a personal manuscript copy of Handel's Messiah in 1766.

He was known as a virtuoso keyboardist, performing at concerts throughout the region before gaining the position of organist at St Martin's in Birmingham in 1771. One of his pupils was Anne Boulton, daughter of Birmingham industrialist Matthew Boulton.

He married his cousin Ann Harris (1747-1767) on 12 January 1767 at Ludlow, but she died later in the same year. He married again on 22 October 1771, to Anne Silvester (1748 - 1812) in Birmingham, with whom he had 11 children.

He died either in Liverpool or at Eccleston Hill Lodge Lodge (although this source incorrectly calls it Ecclusham Lodge near Wrexham). The Chester Courant of 1 November 1814 records his death at Eccleston Lodge.

== Appointments ==
- Organist at St Laurence's Church, Ludlow 1764 - 1771
- Organist at Birmingham Parish Church 1771 - 1802

Cultural offices
Preceded by David Valentine	Organist of St Laurence Church, Ludlow; 1764-1771	Succeeded by Miles Coyle
Preceded by Richard Hobbs	Organist of St Martin in the Bull Ring; 1771-1802	Unknown

== Compositions ==
He wrote:

- Eight Songs 1771
- Six piano quartets 1774
- A further collection of songs.
