= Penry Williams (artist) =

Welsh artist (1802–1885)

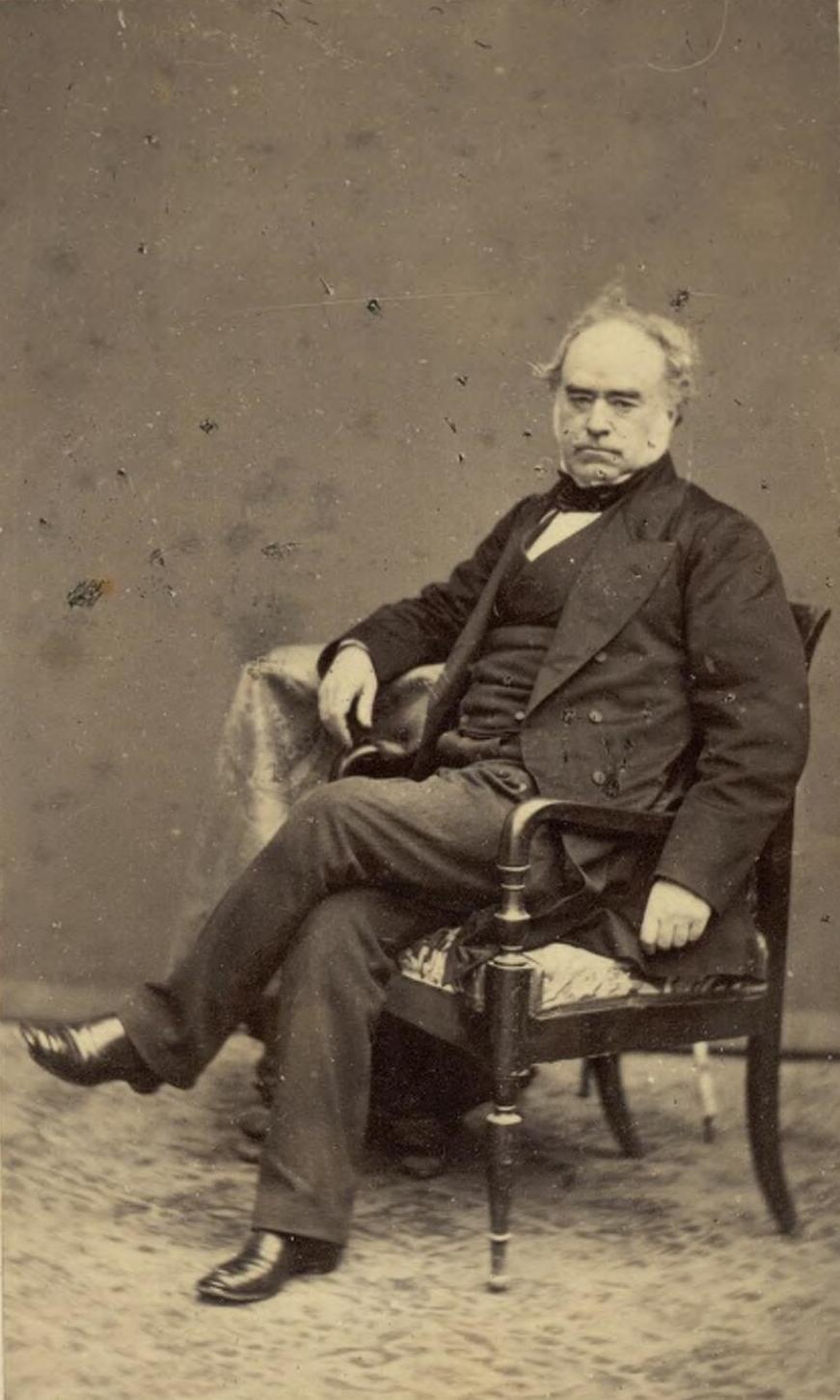
Portrait of Penry Williams

Penry Williams (1802 – 27 July 1885) was a Welsh artist who spent most of his life in Rome.

== Life ==
He was baptised in February 1802 at Merthyr Tydfil, and was the son of a house-painter. Sent to London by Sir John Guest and others, he studied in the schools of the Royal Academy under Henry Fuseli, and in 1821 gained a silver medal from the Society of Arts for a "drawing from the antique". From 1822, he was a frequent exhibitor of portraits and views at the Royal Academy, British Institution and Society of British Artists until 1827, when he settled in Rome.

In April 1828 Williams was elected an associate of the Society of Painters in Watercolours, exhibiting annually until 1833, when he resigned. Williams's Rome studio was one of the recognised attractions for English visitors, for half a century. He died in Rome on 27 July 1885, and his remaining works were sold at Christie's in the following year.

== Personal life ==
Throughout most of his time in Rome Williams had a relationship with the Welsh artist John Gibson

== Works ==
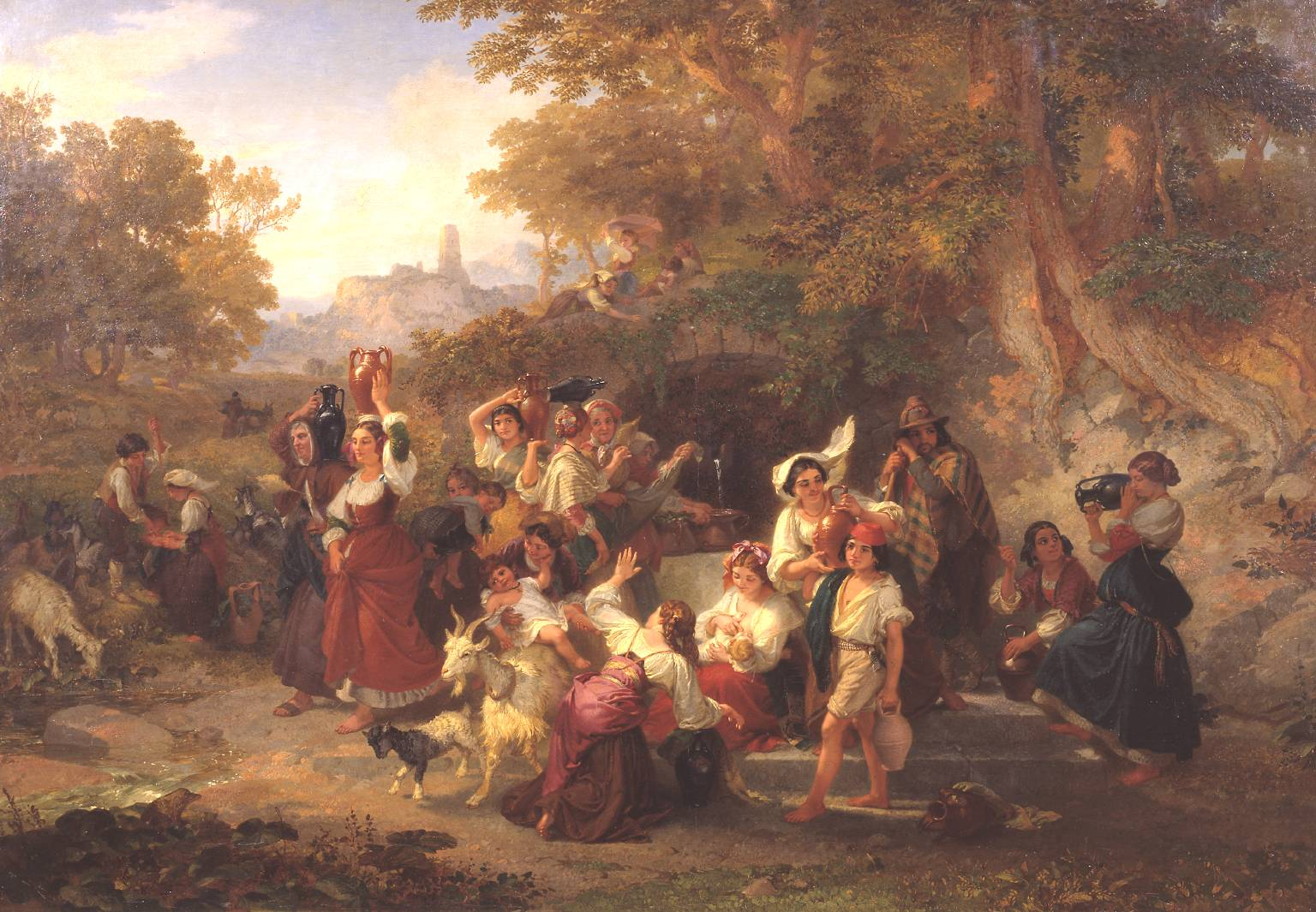
Neapolitan Peasants at a Fountain (1859), by Penry Williams

Williams worked mainly on Italian views and scenes of Roman life, in conventional style. He contributed works to the Royal Academy until 1869, and had many distinguished patrons. Among his prominent works were The Festa of the Madonna dell' Arco, Ferry on the River Ninfa, Il Voto, or the Convalescent, The Fountain: a Scene at Mola di Gaeta, Italian Girls preparing for a Festa (engraved by D. Lucas, 1830), and Procession to the Christening (engraved by Lumb Stocks for William Finden's British Gallery of Art). The National Gallery acquired his Neapolitan Peasants at a Fountain, Wayside in Italy, and The Tambourine; they have since been transferred to the Tate Gallery. The last two, presented by Robert Vernon, were engraved by C. Rolls for The Art Journal. Some of Williams's designs were engraved for The Amulet (1827–30) and the Literary Souvenir (1836).
