= Harold Carpenter Lumb Stocks =

English cathedral organist

Harold Carpenter Lumb Stocks (21 October 1884 – 1956) was an English cathedral organist, who served in St Asaph Cathedral.

== Background ==
Stocks was born in Essendon, Hertfordshire. He was the son of Marian Stocks and Walter Fryer Stocks, an artist. Stocks was also a composer, principally of church music, and the author of books on the training of choristers and cathedral organists.

== Career ==
Assistant organist:

- Ely Cathedral 1906–09

Organist of:

- Church of St John the Baptist, Yeovil 1909–11
- St Laurence Church, Ludlow 1911–17
- St Asaph Cathedral 1917–56

Cultural offices
Preceded by Norman Charles Woods	Organist and Master of the Choristers of St Laurence Church, Ludlow; 1911–1917	Succeeded by Frank Edgar Bastick
Preceded by William Edward Belcher	Organist and Master of the Choristers of St Asaph Cathedral; 1917–1956	Succeeded by Robert Duke Dickinson
