= Harriet Law =

British freethinker

- Born: Harriet Teresa Frost; 5 November 1831; Ongar, Essex, England
- Died: 19 July 1897 (aged 65); Peckham, London, England
- Occupation: Public speaker
- Known for: Only woman on the general council of the First International

Harriet Teresa Law (née Frost, 5 November 1831 – 19 July 1897) was a leading British freethinker in 19th-century London.

The daughter of a small farmer, she was raised as a "Strict Baptist" but later converted to atheism. She became a salaried speaker for the secularist movement and addressed many often hostile audiences around the country. She was invited to sit on the general council of the First International, the only woman to do so, where she engaged in debate with prominent communists including Karl Marx and Friedrich Engels. From 1877 to 1878 she published The Secular Chronicle, which covered subjects such as socialism, atheism and women's rights.

== Early years ==
Harriet Teresa Frost was born in Ongar on 5 November 1831. She was brought up as a Strict Baptist. Her father was a small farmer, but when his business failed he moved with his family to London's East End. Law taught in a Sunday school to bring some income to the family. In the 1850s she began debating with Owenites such as George Holyoake and Charles Southwell who were giving lectures in East London. In the process she lost her religious beliefs. She "saw the light of reason" in 1855 and became a strong supporter of Holyoake. She embraced atheism, feminism, and "Owenite co-operation" after these discussions.

Harriet married Edward Law on 11 January 1855. They lived at 38 Boyson Road in Walworth and had four children. Her husband was also a free thinker.

== Public figure ==
=== Secularist speaker ===
From 1859 Harriet Law was paid a salary for lecturing for the secular movement. She spoke out against Christianity at meetings around the country in the 1860s and 1870s. Often it was difficult to find premises that could be hired for such meetings, and often the audience was hostile and at times even violent. When giving a series of lectures in Keighley, Yorkshire, in September 1866 she had to compete with Henry Grattan Guinness, of the brewing family, a nonconformist evangelist who held meetings at the same time to try to counteract her influence. Writing in 1893, Annie Besant said of her, "Mrs. Harriet Law, a woman of much courage and of strong natural ability, had many a rough meeting in her lecturing days."

Mainstream feminist groups excluded Law due to her Marxist and atheist beliefs. Other opponents dismissed Law's views as worthless since she was from the lower classes, poorly educated and a woman. A member of the Bible Defence Association said he "could not debate in the streets with a woman, and especially one of Mrs Law's class." A lecture that Law gave in Woolwich on "How I became a freethinker and why I remain one" was attacked in the press as "the infidel lecture."

Some of the lectures Law gave at Cleveland Hall in Fitzroy Square in London in the 1860s were titled "The Teachings and Philosophy of J.S. Mill, Esq.", "The Late Robert Owen: a Tribute to His Memory" and "Appeal to Women to Consider their Interests in Connexion with the Social, Political, and Theological Aspects of the Times." In June 1867 she shared the stage at a suffrage meeting in Cleveland Hall with the American physician and woman's rights activist Mary Edwards Walker. Law talked of John Stuart Mill's proposal for Woman's suffrage, which was being debated by the House of Commons, while Walker spoke of reform to the marriage laws. In 1876 Law was engaged by the Lancashire Secular Union to give ten special lectures, each attended by about 5,000 people.

On her lecture tours in the provinces Harriet Law did not represent the leadership of the movement, but served as a freelance speaker at the meetings of the local secularist societies. Although prominent in the movement, Law did not join the leadership of the National Secular Society (NSS). This may have been due to difficulty working with its leader, Charles Bradlaugh. At the 1866 NSS conference in Leeds she backed George William Foote in his attempt to oust Bradlaugh, which did not succeed. Soon after, Foote was expelled from the NSS. She was offered a vice-presidency of the NSS in 1867 and again in 1876, but refused both times.

In the mid-1870s Annie Besant threatened to eclipse Law as the leading woman free thought lecturer. A biographer of Bradlaugh said "Mrs Besant had come on the scene, and there was not room for two ladies as Secularist advocates." Law fell out with Bradlaugh and Besant and left the NSS in 1877. George Holyoake, Charles Watts and Harriet Law then founded the British Secular Union, which remained active until 1884.

=== Communist leader ===
At first the International Workingmen's Association (IWA), now known as the First International, had mostly male membership, although in 1865 it was agreed that women could become members. The initial leadership was exclusively male. At the IWA General Council meeting on 16 April 1867 a letter from Harriet Law about Women's Rights was read, and it was agreed to ask her if she would be willing to attend council meetings. On 25 June 1867 she was admitted to the General Council, and for the next five years was the only woman representative. Mostly she remained silent, but she is recorded as intervening in a number of discussions. In 1868 Marx said that the "well-known orator Mrs. Harriet Law" represented the atheist popular movement in the General Council. It may have been due to her influence that Marx began to talk of Working Women as well as Working Men in declarations and addresses.

Law did not attend the IWA General Council meetings between August 1870 and October 1871. In response to a question on her absence Friedrich Engels said she had told him she considered she was still a member. She was among the signatories on the 1872 brochure The Fictitious Splits in the International in which Marx and Engels opposed Mikhail Bakunin and his supporters. After leaving the General Council, Law was elected to represent the Central Society of Working Women of Geneva at the IWA's Hague Congress in 1872, but for some unexplained reason was unable to attend. The Internationalist women of Geneva were against the "family wage" concept that was being advocated in America by Marxists such as Friedrich Adolph Sorge, and wanted the IWA to demand clauses requiring "equal advantages" for women in labour agreements.

=== Last years ===
Harriet Law bought the Secular Chronicle after the founder, George Reddalls, died of typhoid in October 1875. She was editor of the journal from 1876 to 1879, assisted by her daughter. She gave the paper a broader scope, with sections that covered atheism, women's rights, Owenite co-operation and republicanism. She published a short biography of Karl Marx, with a portrait, and in the next issue published an article by Marx in which he pointed out the errors in George Howell's History of the International. She published profiles of women such as the freethinker and women's rights activist Mary Wollstonecraft. In 1877 she published An Hour with Harriet Martineau.

Law continued to speak in public. In July 1877 it was reported that she had engaged Cleveland Hall for another 12 months, and that she and others would talk on "The Recent Trial in Relation to Secularism." (Note: In 1876 Bradlaugh and Besant republished a pamphlet advocating birth control, The Fruits of Philosophy, or the Private Companion of Young Married People, by the American Charles Knowlton. As they had expected, a charge of obscene libel was brought against them, and they used the trial to present arguments about sexuality, marriage and contraception. They were eventually acquitted on a technicality.) On 29 July 1877 she was scheduled to speak in Manchester on "The Freethought of the Future, as Foreshadowed in the Writings of Moncure D. Conway." However, illness forced her to cancel the talk. On 23 December 1877 she spoke in Glasgow, and a week later in Leeds. On 6 and 13 January 1878 she spoke in Newcastle-on-Tyne. Harriet Law handed the Secular Chronicle to new owners at the end on 1878. During her three years running the paper she had lost £1,000, a significant amount at the time.

Law's health forced her to cut back her activities after 1879. However, she continued to speak at times. A hostile account of a meeting in 1880 was given in The Shield of faith, which called her a "secular lady lecturer". The writer said "A long course of Woman's Rights may have satisfied Mrs. Law that every married woman should rule her husband..." but pointed out that "In law the husband is held responsible for what his wife says; the law holds that the husband rules the wife." On 6 March 1881 she spoke at the opening of Leicester Secular Society's new Secular Hall in Humberstone Gate, Leicester. The other speakers were George Jacob Holyoake, Annie Besant and Charles Bradlaugh.

Harriet Law died of a heart attack on 19 July 1897, having been ill with bronchitis. At that time, she lived at 24 Somerville Road in Peckham.

== Beliefs ==
On 27 August 1868 Law argued against Karl Marx, who opposed turning the IWA into what he called a "debating club". She was in favour of debates. On 28 July 1868 she again appeared to oppose Marx, praising the positive effect of factory automation in reducing the dependence of women on men. On education, she said that "The property of the Church must be secularised and devoted to schools. We want fewer parsons and more schoolmasters". Law was against imperialism during an era when many of the elite in Britain were proud of the continued expansion of the British Empire. She felt that a competitive economy did not let the worker get full value for his work. She was in favour of a communist system where a directing power distributed labour according to requirements. This was the only way to ensure the right to work and to obtain value for that work.

Harriet Law has been called "a florid middle-aged farmer's daughter" who "had what some devotees of 'culchaw' (Note: 'culchaw': culture. Refers to an upper-class English pronunciation of the word) do not possess—a great deal of natural ability. According to Bradlaugh she was "earnest, brusquely honest". William Stewart Ross said "She was a plain, blunt, honest woman, utterly free from all suspicion of humbug." Eleanor Marx said she was one of the first women to recognise, "the importance of a woman's organisation from the proletarian point of view", and went on to say "When the history of the labour movement in England is written, the name of Harriet Law will be entered into the golden book of the proletariat."
