= Secular Review =

British weekly periodical

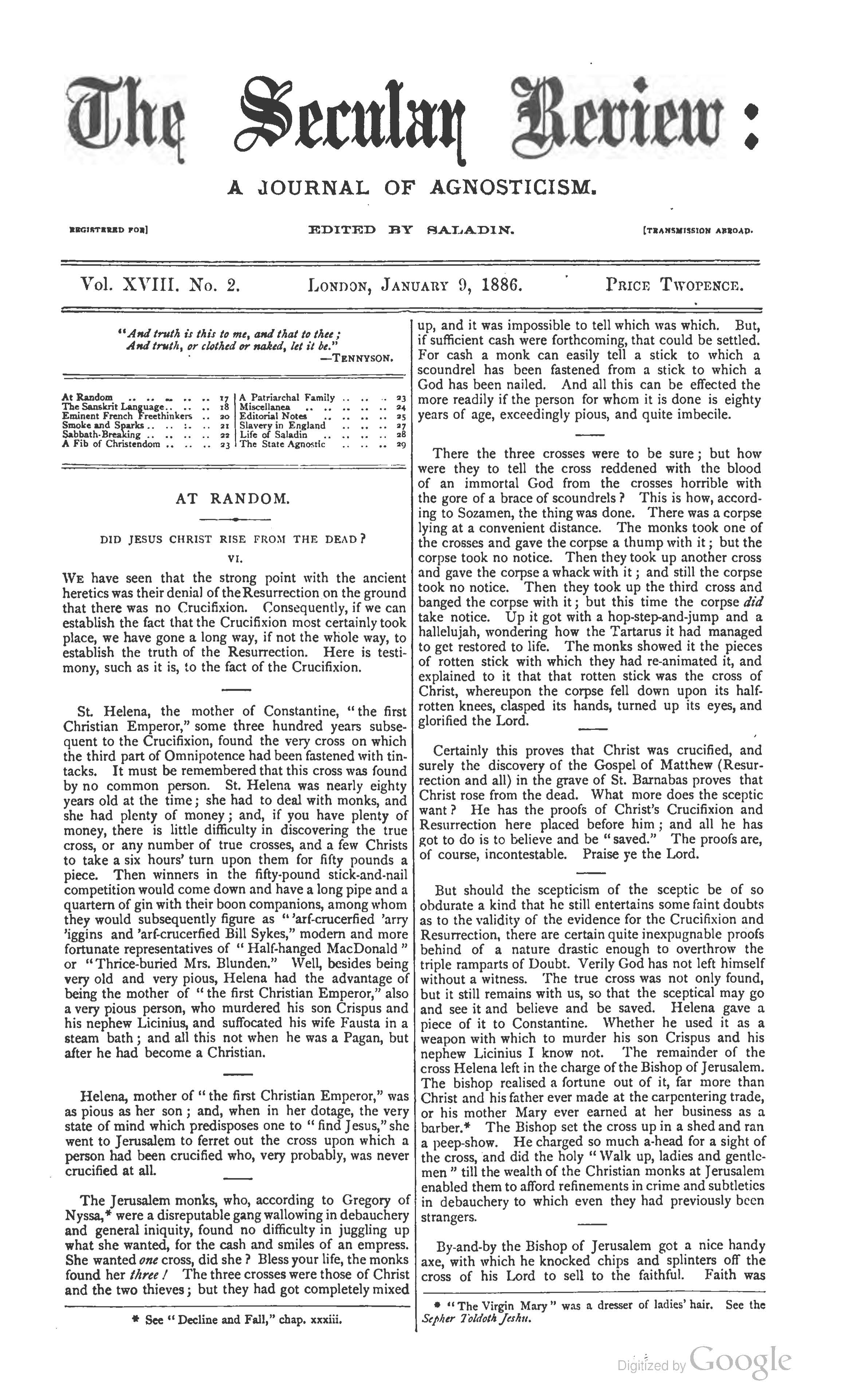
- Secular Review cover, 9 Jan. 1886
- Type: Weekly periodical
- Editor: George Jacob Holyoake (1876–1877); Charles Watts (1877–1882); George William Foote (1877–1878); William Stewart Ross (1882–1907)
- Founded: 1876
- Ceased publication: 1907
- Political alignment: Freethought
- Language: English

Secular Review (1876–1907) was a freethought/secularist weekly publication in nineteenth and early twentieth-century Britain that appeared under a variety of names. It represented a "relatively moderate style of Secularism," more open to old Owenite and new socialist influences in contrast to the individualism and social conservatism of Charles Bradlaugh and his National Reformer. It was edited during the period 1882–1906 by William Stewart Ross (1844–1906), who signed himself "Saladin."

== History ==
The journal was founded in August 1876 by George Jacob Holyoake, after he and George William Foote experienced difficulties with their collaborative editorship of the Secularist: A Liberal Weekly Review (1876–1877).

In February 1877, Charles Watts assumed the editorship. A new series was started in June 1877, merging it with Foote's Secularist, under joint editorship, to form the Secular Review and Secularist. Foote served as co-editor with Watts until March 1878, after which Watts edited the paper on his own until 1882.

William Stewart Ross joined Watts as co-editor in January 1882 and assumed sole editorship in July 1884, using the pseudonym "Saladin". In December 1888, Ross rechristened it the Agnostic Journal and Secular Review, and shortly thereafter changed the name again to the Agnostic Journal and Eclectic Review. Ross died in November 1906 and the last issue was published in June 1907.
