= British Secular Union =

British secularist society

- Formation: 1877; 149 years ago
- Region served: Great Britain

The British Secular Union was a secularist organisation, founded in August 1877, primarily as a response to what its founders regarded as the "dictatorial" powers of Charles Bradlaugh as President of the National Secular Society.

== History ==
The founding members were Kate Watts, Harriet Law, George William Foote and Josiah Grimson; George Holyoake had accepted the nomination of Vice President of the National Secular Society so only gave support for the formation. The group adopted the Secular Review as their official paper.

The British Secular Union had broadly the same goals as the National Secular Society but distanced themselves from Bradlaugh's style, especially when it came to the Knowlton Pamphlet, which advocated birth control. Even though Charles Watts owned the rights to the Knowlton pamphlet (and had no intention of publishing it), Charles Bradlaugh and Annie Besant broke with Watts and published the pamphlet anyway, subsequently facing prosecution. The issue of birth control was a contentious one within the secular movement. Bradlaugh managed to steer opinion away from the birth control element and instead made secularism a freedom of speech issue.

Like other secular societies, the British Secular Union opened its membership to women. Aside from membership, women were also able to lecture and run for executive positions.

While the British Secular Union did not have as many members as the NSS, it had strong regional representation with the largest regional secular group, the Leicester Secular Society, joining the union.
