= The Freethought Publishing Company =

English publishing company

- Status: Defunct
- Founded: 1877
- Founder: Annie Besant, Charles Bradlaugh
- Country of origin: U.K.
- Headquarters location: 28 Stonecutter Street, London E.C.
- Distribution: National
- Publication types: Books and tracts

The Freethought Publishing Company was established in 1877 by Annie Besant and Charles Bradlaugh to publish books and pamphlets to promote the cause of secularism, social reform and freedom of thought. Their publications were printed initially at 28 Stonecutter Street, London E.C and then at 63 Fleet Street, London E.C.

One of their first publications in 1877 was to reproduce a treatise on birth control written by a physician, Charles Knowlton, which had been published anonymously in the US in 1832 as The Fruits of Philosophy. The treatise advocated controlling reproduction and described methods to prevent conception. Besant and Bradlaugh were prosecuted and found guilty, but the verdict was quashed on a technicality. In the same year the company published Annie Besant's influential tract entitled The Law of Population: Its Consequences and Its Bearing Upon Human Conduct and Morals.

The company published a series of volumes called the International Library of Science and Freethought including books by George Holyoake, who had coined the term ‘secularism’, and translations from the German of The Pedigree of Man by Ernst Haeckel and of Mind in Animals by Ludwig Büchner. The company published essays by Edward Aveling, a spokesman for evolution and a founder member of the Socialist League; by Logan Mitchell, who wrote The Christian Mythology Unveiled; and republished essays by American freethinkers such as Robert Ingersoll and Moncure Conway. The company also published the Hall of Science Manuals with titles by Besant and Aveling.

The company published little after Bradlaugh died in 1891 and the last original publication was issued in 1902, a pamphlet written by Charles Watts.

== See also ==
- Rationalist Association, contemporaneous organisation with similar purpose
- The Freethinker magazine
