= Kate Watts =

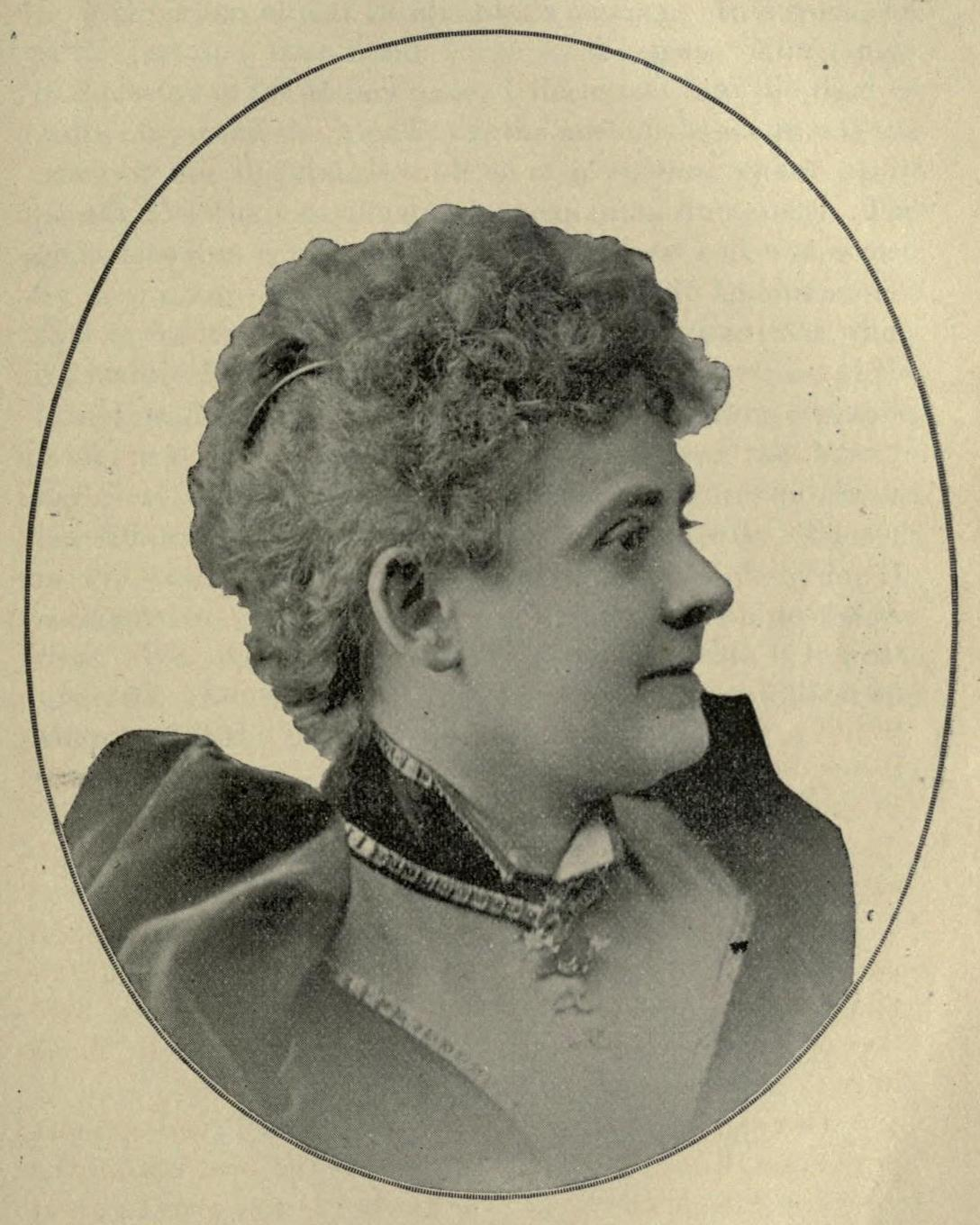
- Born: Eunice Kate Nowlan c. 1848; London, England
- Died: 1924
- Other names: Kate Eunice Watts
- Known for: early advocate for birth control
- Notable credit(s): Founder of Watts's Literary Guide (later New Humanist), and the Rationalist Press Association
- Spouse: Charles Watts (m. 1870)
- Children: 1

Eunice Kate Watts (née Nowlan; c. 1848 – 25 February 1924) was a British secularist and feminist writer and lecturer. She was one of the most prominent women active in the British freethought movement in the nineteenth and early twentieth centuries.

She was born in London to William and Eunice Nowlan, a freethinking family. In 1870 she married Charles Watts (after the death of his first wife, Mary Ann), and their daughter Kate Eunice Watts was born in May 1875. She was a committed advocate of female education and emancipation. Her series of articles 'The Education and Position of Women' in the Secular Review in 1879 argued that women should have the freedom to earn their own living, live in equal terms with their husbands if they chose to marry, and live a single life without fear of social opprobrium. She also wrote the pamphlet Christianity: Defective and Unnecessary.

Watts rose to prominence for her opposition to then NSS President & Founder Charles Bradlaugh's involvement in the Knowlton Trial, and was one of the founding members of the British Secular Union, the rival to Bradlaugh's NSS. In 1877 she wrote Reply to Mr Bradlaugh outlining her opposition, which centred on the internal politics of the secular movement and her desire to disassociate secularism with "sexual immorality" of the Owenite movement. She nonetheless indicated that she supported the need for birth control and sex education.
