= Hypatia Bradlaugh Bonner =

British activist (1858-1935)

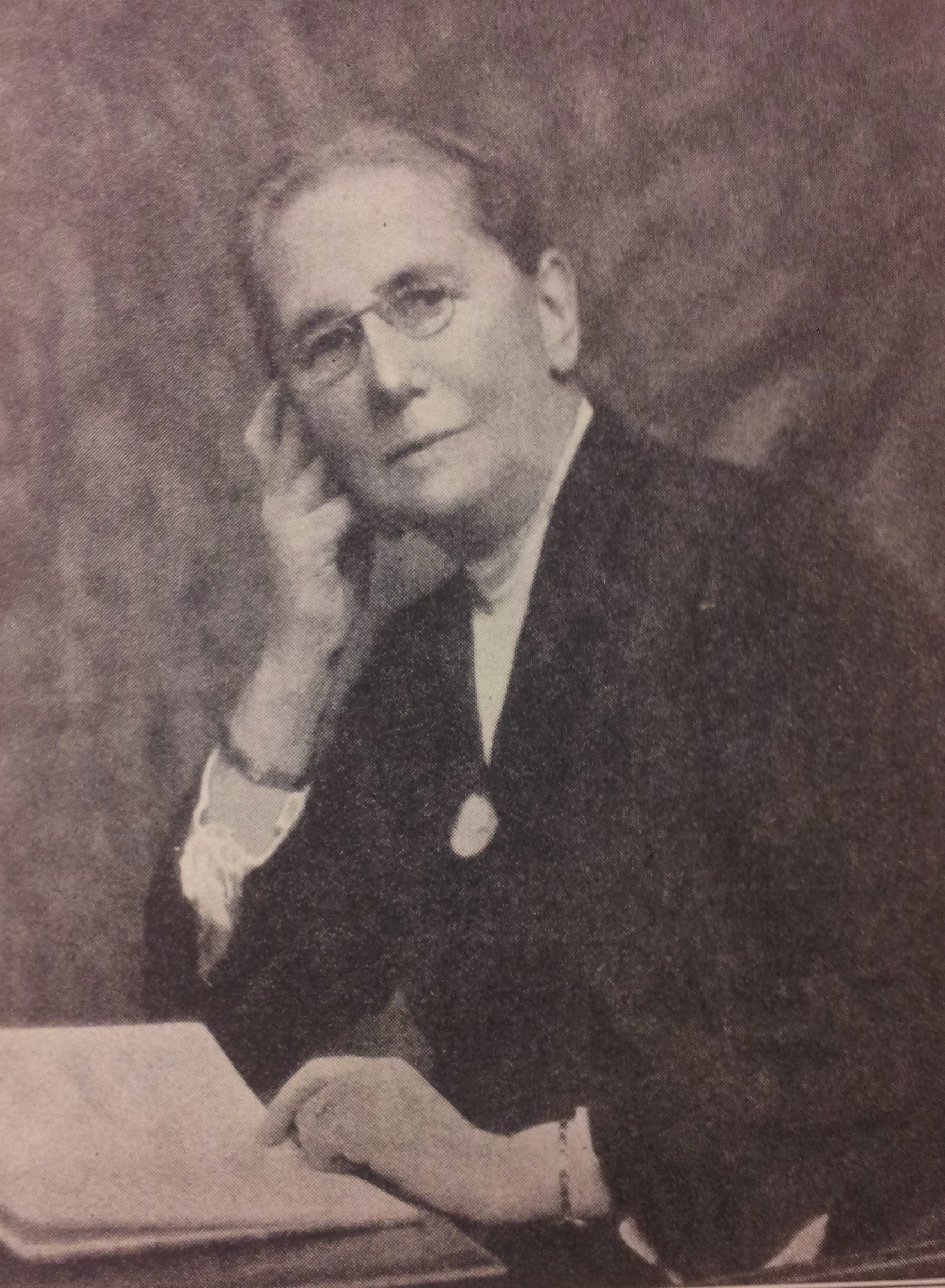
- 1929 photograph of Hypatia Bradlaugh Bonner
- Born: Hypatia Bradlaugh; 31 March 1858; Hackney, London, England
- Died: 25 August 1935 (aged 77); Tooting, London, England
- Education: University of London
- Father: Charles Bradlaugh

Hypatia Bradlaugh Bonner (31 March 1858 – 25 August 1935) was a British peace activist, author, atheist and freethinker, and the daughter of Charles Bradlaugh.

== Early life and teaching ==
She was born Hypatia Bradlaugh, at 3 Hedger's Terrace, Hackney, London, the second daughter of Charles Bradlaugh, the first openly atheist Member of Parliament and founder of the National Secular Society, and Susannah Lamb Hooper. She was named after Hypatia, the Ancient Greek pagan philosopher, mathematician, astronomer and teacher.

Bradlaugh Bonner was educated in private schools in London and Paris, and qualified as a science teacher from the University of London, which admitted women to "full privileges" (i.e. degrees) in 1878. She taught in the Hall of Science for the South Kensington Science and Art Examinations, and also acted as a secretary for her father after 1888.

The Halls of Science were mainly for adult education and self-help, like those offered by Mechanics' Institutes and religious organisations at the time. The South Kensington Hall of Science was started by Edward Aveling, and other teachers included her sister Alice Bradlaugh (1856–1888) and Annie Besant. The results from the South Kensington Hall of Science were very good, with students exceeding the national average on their examinations in all but one of their offered classes.

Bonner was also a lecturer for the National Secular Society and the Rationalist Press Association.

== Writing ==
Bonner is most remembered for being the author of her father's biography, Charles Bradlaugh: His Life and Work. The Spectator considered the two volumes to be more memoirs than a biography: "That it is preposterously long is manifest at once. More than eight hundred closely printed pages are too much for Charles Bradlaugh, viewed in regard to his real importance in the world", but accepted, "A day will come when they will be found useful".

From 1897 to 1904, she was editor of The Reformer, the main purpose of which according to Bernard Porter was to "vindicate her father's career".

However, she was an active contributor to many secularist periodicals including the National Reformer and author of many other books relating to secularism, blasphemy and freethinking. She often wrote in collaboration with her sister Alice under the signature 'A. and H. Bradlaugh', including a regular current affairs column in the National Reformer called 'Summary of News' during the 1880s. In Penalties upon Opinion she catalogues various trials and cases of blasphemy including the recent revival in blasphemy prosecutions in the first decades of the 20th century. In addition, she published a volume of short stories for children (Princess Vera, and Other Stories, 1886) as part of the Freethought Publishing Company's Young Folks' Library series.

== Peace activism ==
In the lead up to the First World War most peace societies were Christian associations. In 1910, Bonner became the chairperson of the first secular peace society, the Rationalist Peace Society. The aim of the society was to "protest against ideas and methods which are utterly opposed to reason and the interests of social progress". In her introduction to Essays towards peace, Hypatia noted that there was a "growing public opinion in favour of arbitration as the alternative to war" and that it was reason that demonstrated "the futility, the brutality, the economic waste, the immorality of war".

The Rationalist Peace Society remained active throughout the war, but fell into decline after peace was concluded.

== Final years ==
She was a popular lecturer until her voice broke in 1924 and continued to write and served as a magistrate from 1921 until 1934. Her role in public affairs has been estimated as "she expressed her radicalism and belief in equal status for women from within Liberalism rather than through the more publicized suffragette movement".

== Personal life ==
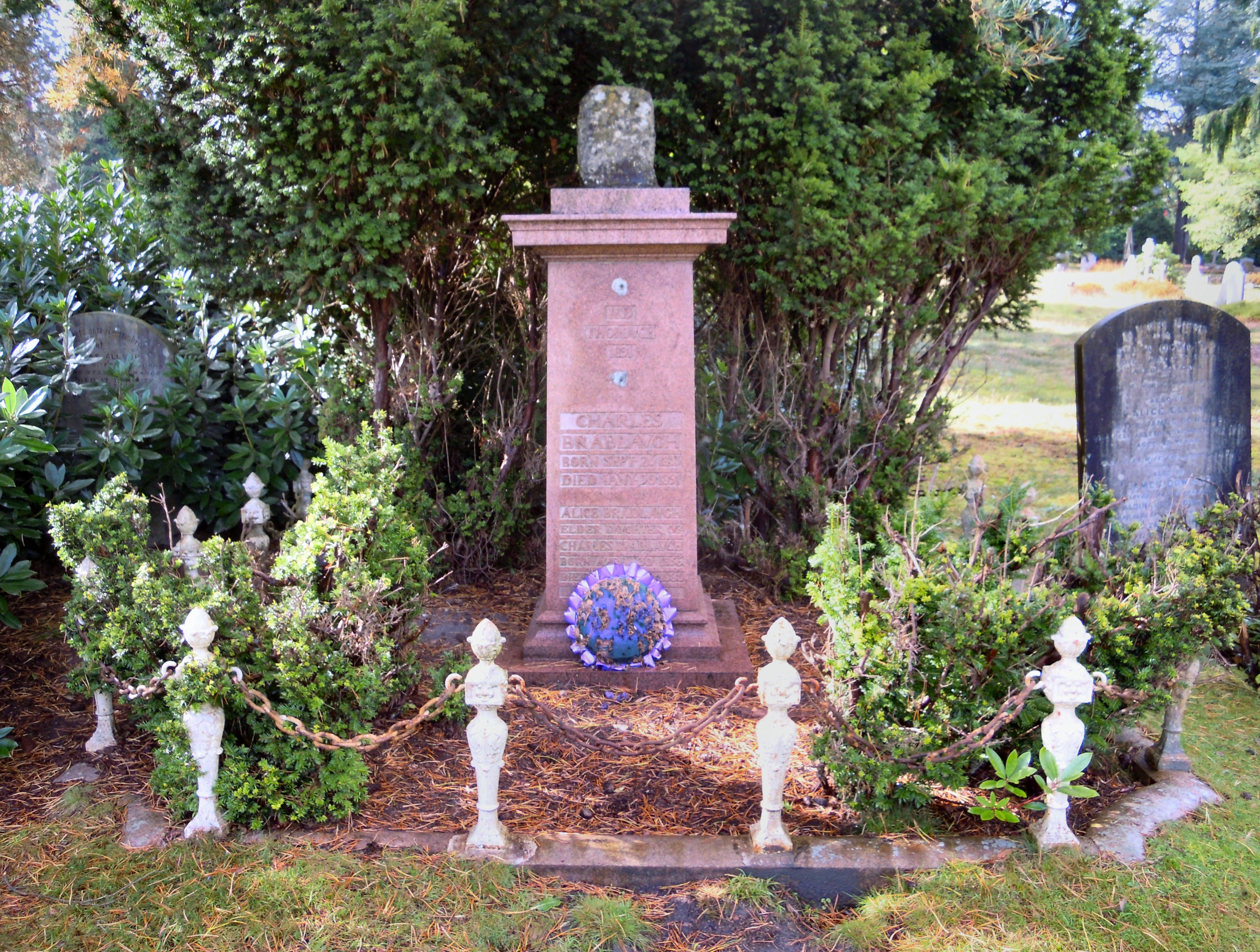
Grave of Bonner and her parents in Brookwood Cemetery

She married Arthur Bonner in 1885 in Marylebone, London. They had two children, Kenneth (June – September 1886) and Charles Bradlaugh Bonner (28 April 1890 – 2 September 1966).

She died at home on 25 August 1935 at 23 Streathbourne Road, Tooting, London, after an abdominal operation for cancer. She was cremated at Golders Green Crematorium on 28 August, and her ashes were buried in her father's grave at Brookwood Cemetery.

== Publications ==
- Charles Bradlaugh: A Record of His Life and Work (Volume 1, Volume 2, 1894)
- The Gallows and the Lash (1897)
- Penalties Upon Opinion (1912)
- The Christian Hell (1913)
- Christianity and Conduct (1919)
