= William Stewart Ross =

Scottish secularist writer and publisher (1844–1906)

William Stewart Ross (20 March 1844 – 30 November 1906) was a Scottish writer and publisher. He was a noted secularist thinker and used the pseudonym "Saladin". Between 1888 and 1906 he was the editor of the Agnostic Journal, successor to the Secular Review.

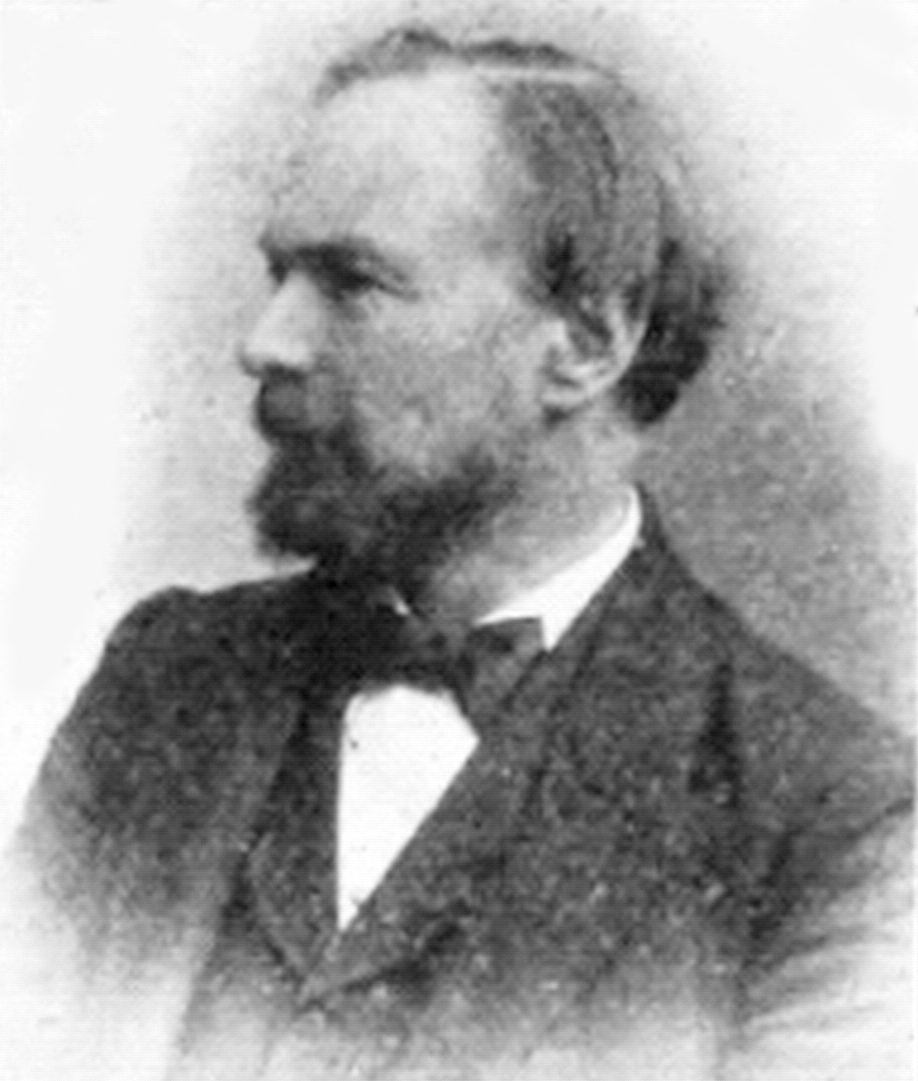
William Stewart Ross – "SALADIN"

== Life and career ==
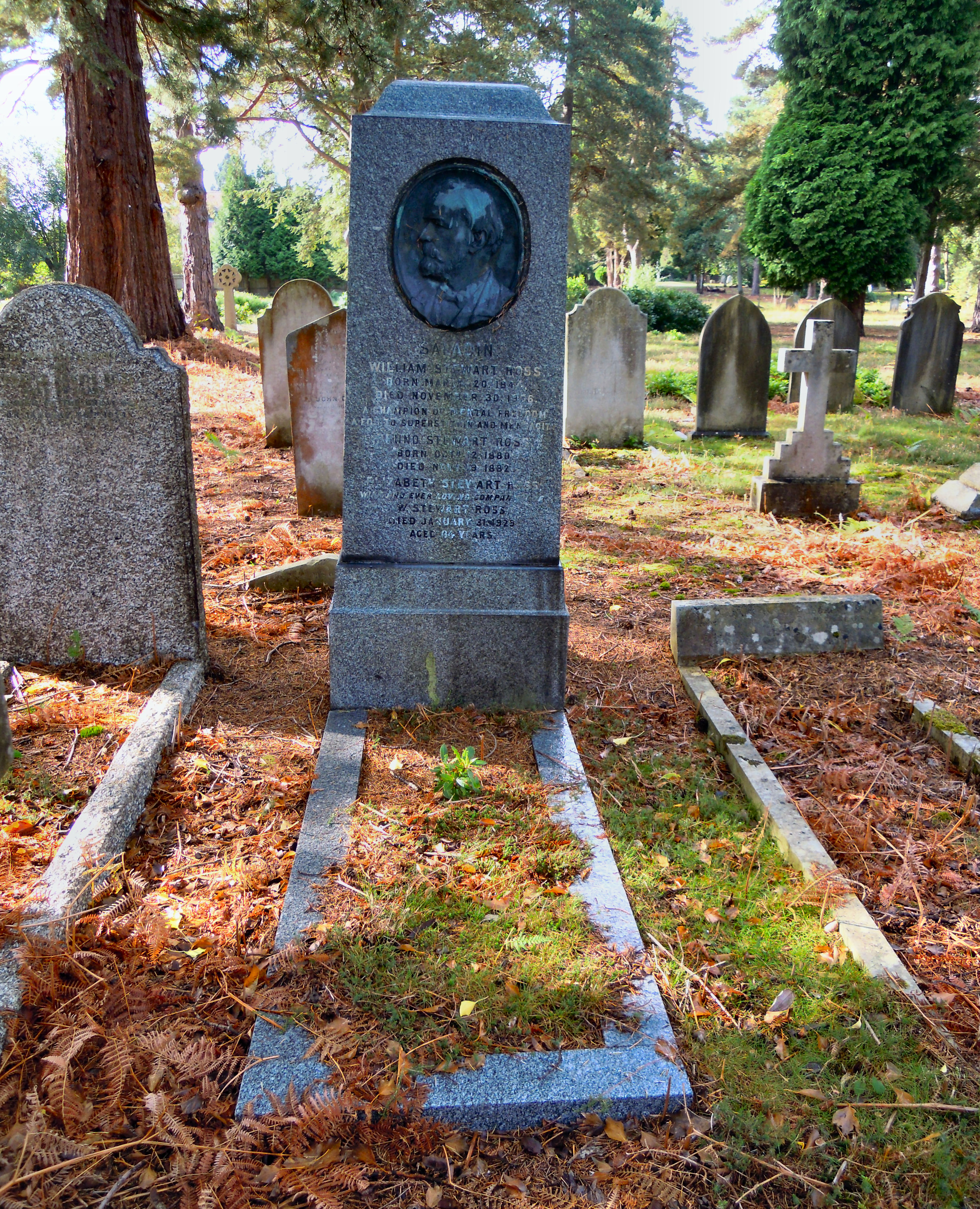
The grave of William Stewart Ross in Brookwood Cemetery

He was born in Kirkbean, Kirkcudbrightshire, into a Presbyterian family. At the age of 20, he began studying at Glasgow University, with the intention of entering the Church. However, he became more interested in literature, particularly the works of Robert Burns and Thomas Carlyle, and moved to London where he managed the Thomas Laurie bookshop.

In London in 1872, Ross established his own publishing company, W. Stewart & Co., and for some years primarily issued educational works and magazines. But Ross also became a leading advocate of freethought, agnosticism, rationalism and secularism, and served as president of the Lambeth Radical Association. In 1880 he chaired a lecture by Charles Bradlaugh, with whom he disagreed over the issue of birth control, and soon became associated with the branch of secular thought led by Charles Watts and his son C. A. Watts.

In 1882 he served as co-editor with the elder Watts on the Secular Review, and two years later Ross became its sole editor and proprietor, penning many essays on secularism using the pseudonym "Saladin". In December 1888, Ross changed the name of Secular Review to the Agnostic Journal and Secular Review, and shortly thereafter changed the name one final time to the Agnostic Journal and Eclectic Review. The last issue was published in June 1907, a few months after Ross's death.

Ross wrote a number of books, including The Flagellants (1884), God and his Book (1887), Roses and Rue (1891), and Woman: Her Glory and Her Shame (in two volumes, 1894). He also penned several volumes of poetry, winning a gold medal for the best poem memorializing Robert Burns at the unveiling of a statue in 1879, and another for a poem describing a visit to the graveside of the revered Scottish poet. One of his poems, Caractacus the Briton, published in 1881, is noted for its refrain, "Caractacus the Briton, the bravest of the brave!".

In later years he was confined to bed with sclerosis, but continued to write and edit. He died in London at the age of 62 and was buried in Brookwood Cemetery, Surrey, England. He was survived by his wife Elizabeth (née Sherar) and four children.
