= Charles Adolphus Row =

English Church of England clergyman and philosopher

- Born: 1816; St John, Cornwall
- Died: 1896 (aged 79–80)
- Known for: Preacher and moral philosopher

Charles Adolphus Row (1816–1896) was an English Church of England clergyman and moral philosopher.

== Life ==
Charles Adolphus Row was born in 1816. He was the third son of William Row of St John, Cornwall. He attended Pembroke College, Oxford where he matriculated on 7 May 1834 at the age of 17. He was a scholar at Pembroke from 1834 to 1838. He obtained a B.A. on 29 November 1838 and an M.A. on 11 November 1841.

From 1848 to 1861 Row was headmaster of Royal Free Grammar School, Mansfield.

In 1870 the Evangelical Magazine and Missionary Chronicle noted that Row was delivering a course of lectures in defence of the gospel at Cleveland Hall, Fitzroy square, London, the former secularist center. In May 1874 he was appointed to the Prebend of Harleston in St Paul's Cathedral.

Row delivered the Bampton Lectures at the University of Oxford in 1877. He took as his theme "Christian Evidences Viewed in Relation to Modern Thought." In his lectures he looked for a compromise between theologians who believed in the complete infallibility of the Bible and scientists who pointed out problems with a literal interpretation. He proposed an innovative solution, which he knew might seem daring to some of his audience since it allowed that the Bible might include errors of fact:

If, for example, we assume that inspiration was not a general but a functional endowment, and consequently limited to subjects in which religion is directly involved, and that in those which stand outside it the writers of the different books in the bible were left to the free use of their ordinary faculties, a large number of the objections which are popularly urged against Revelation from the standpoint of physical science and modern criticism would become simply nugatory.

Charles Adolphus Row died in 1896.

== Bibliography ==
Row was a prolific author. A sampling of his work:

- Row, Charles Adolphus (1850). Letter to the Right Honourable Lord John Russell, M.P., First Lord of His Majesty's Treasury, on the Constitutional Defects of the University and Colleges of Oxford: With Suggestions for a Royal Commission Inquiry into the Universities. James Ridgway.
- Row, Charles Adolphus (1864). The nature and extent of divine inspiration: as stated by the writers, and deduced from the facts, of the New Testament. Longman, Green, Longman, Roberts, and Green. ISBN 9780837049878.
- Row, Charles Adolphus (1868). The Jesus of the Evangelists: His Historical Character Vindicated; Or, An Examination of the Internal Evidence of Our Lord's Divine Mission with Reference to Modern Controversy. Williams and Norgate.
- Row, Charles Adolphus (1868). On Some of the Philosophical Principles Contained in Mr. Buckle's "History of Civilization" in Reference to the Laws of the Moral and Religious Developments of Man ...
- Row, Charles Adolphus (1874). The Principles of Modern Pantheistic and Atheistic Philosophy, as Exemplified in the Last Works of Strauss and Others: Being a Paper Read Before the Victoria Institute, Or Philosophical Society of Great Britain, 13th April, 1874. Robert Hardwicke.
- Row, Charles Adolphus (1874). Alleged difficulties in the moral teaching of the new testament: A lecture delivered in the New hall of science, Old street, City road, under the auspices of "The Christian Evidence Society". Hodder and Stoughton.
- Row, Charles Adolphus (1874). The Historical Evidence of the Resurrection of Jesus Christ. [A Lecture.].
- Row, Charles Adolphus (1875). The Supernatural in the New Testament Possible, Credible and Historical; Or, an Examination of the Validity of Some Recent Objections Against Christianity as a Divine Revelation. [An Answer to "Supernatural Religion: an Inquiry into the Reality of Divine Revelation." ].
- Row, Charles Adolphus (1877). Christian Evidences Viewed in Relation to Modern Thought: Eight Lectures Preached Before the University of Oxford in the Year 1877 on the Foundation of the Late Rev. John Bampton, M.A., Canon of Salisbury. Frederic Norgate.
- Row, Charles Adolphus (1880). On Human Responsibility.
- Row, Charles Adolphus (1881). Reasons for Believing in Christianity: Addressed to Busy People; a Course of Lectures Delivered at St. Paul's Cathedral, at the Request of the Dean and Chapter. Thomas Whittaker.
- Row, Charles Adolphus (1885). Man Not a Machine, But a Responsible Free Agent.
- Row, Charles Adolphus (1887). Future retribution viewed in the light of reason and revelation. Whittaker.
