= Secular Thought =

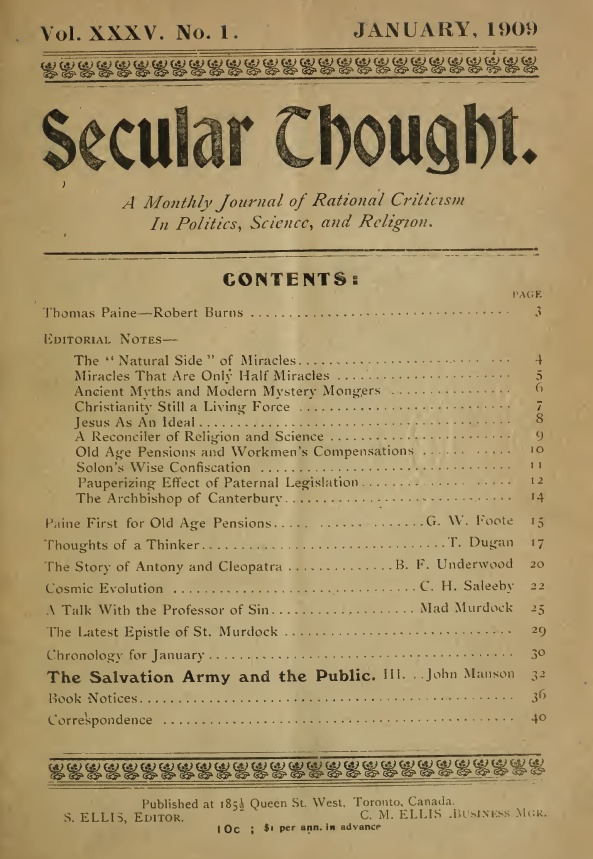
- Secular Thought cover (January 1909)
- Type: biweekly/monthly periodical
- Publisher: C. M. Ellis
- Editor: Charles Watts (1887–1891); James S. Ellis (1891–1911)
- Founded: 1887
- Ceased publication: 1911
- Political alignment: Freethought
- Language: English
- Headquarters: Toronto, Ontario
- Circulation: 800 (1899)

Secular Thought (1887–1911) was a Canadian periodical, published in Toronto, dedicated to promoting the principles of freethought and secularism. Founded and edited during its first several years by English freethinker Charles Watts, the editorship was assumed by Toronto printer and publisher James Spencer Ellis in 1891 when Watts returned to England. During that period, Secular Thought was the principal organ of the freethought movement in Canada, publishing large amounts of material from England and the United States in addition to commenting on Canadian affairs.
