= G. W. Foote =

English radical journalist and secularist (1850–1915)

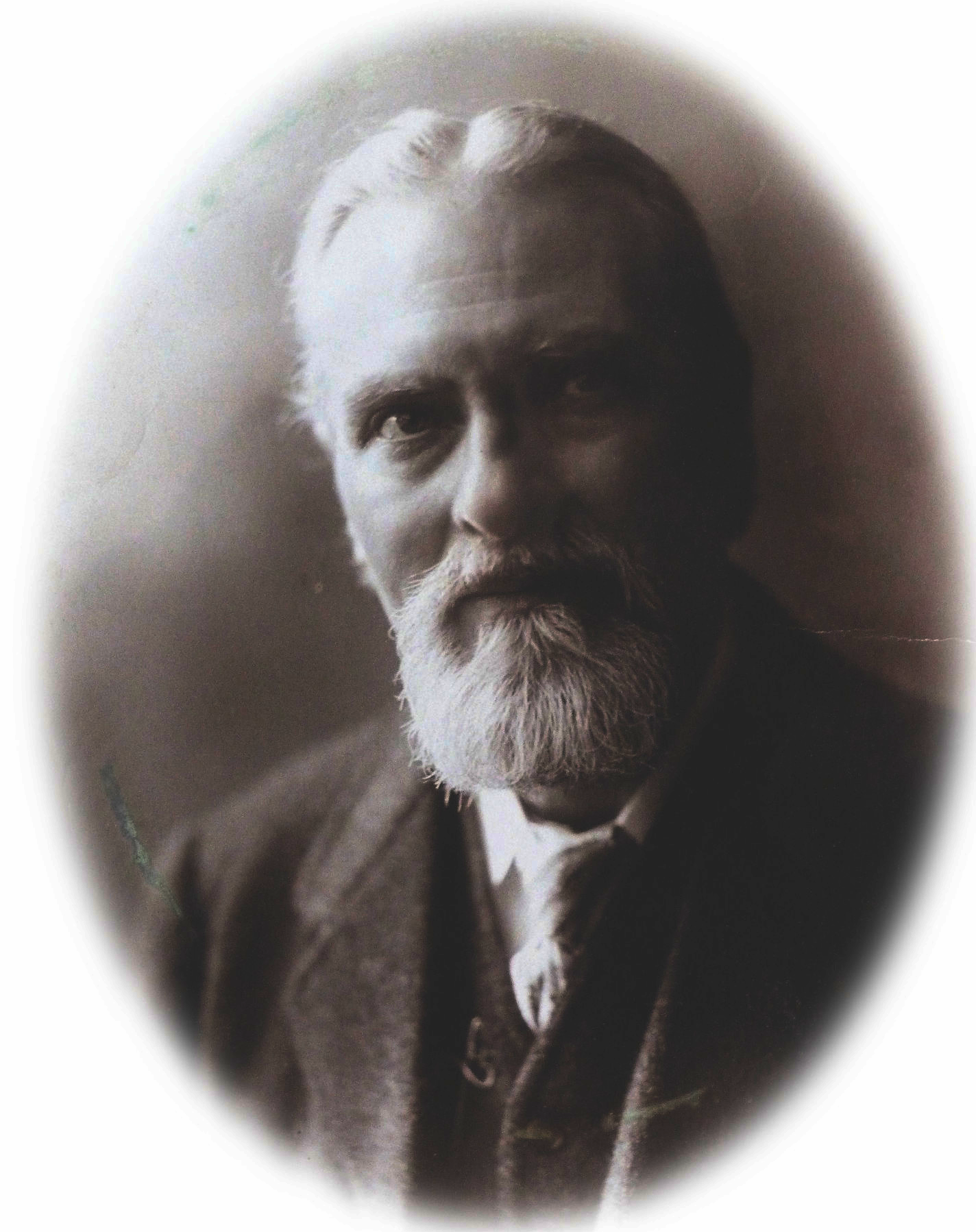
- Foote c. 1910
- Born: George William Foot; 11 January 1850; Plymouth, England
- Died: 17 October 1915 (aged 65); Westcliff-on-Sea, England
- Occupations: Journalist; writer; editor; publisher
- Years active: 1868–1915
- Known for: Secularism activism
- Criminal charges: Blasphemy
- Criminal penalty: 12-month sentence in Holloway prison
- Spouses: Henriette Mariane Heimann (m. 1877; died 1877) Rosalia Martha Angel (m. 1884)
- Children: 4

George William Foote (11 January 1850 – 17 October 1915) was an English radical journalist, writer, editor, publisher, and prominent secularist. He was a leading advocate of freethought, founding and editing notable publications such as The Freethinker and The Secularist and co-founding the British Secular Union. Additionally, he ran a publishing business known as the Pioneer Press. Foote was convicted of blasphemy in 1883 for his satirical attacks on Christianity published in The Freethinker and sentenced to a year in prison. He authored over eighty works, mainly polemical pamphlets, with his editorial essays from The Freethinker compiled into Flowers of Freethought (1893–94).

== Early life ==
George William Foot (Note: For unknown reasons Foote amended the spelling of his surname from Foot to Foote.) was born in Plymouth on 11 January 1850, the son of William Thomas Foot (a customs officer) and Ann (née Winzar). His father died when Foote was four years old and he was raised by his mother to be Anglican, but became a Unitarian at the age of 15.

== Career ==
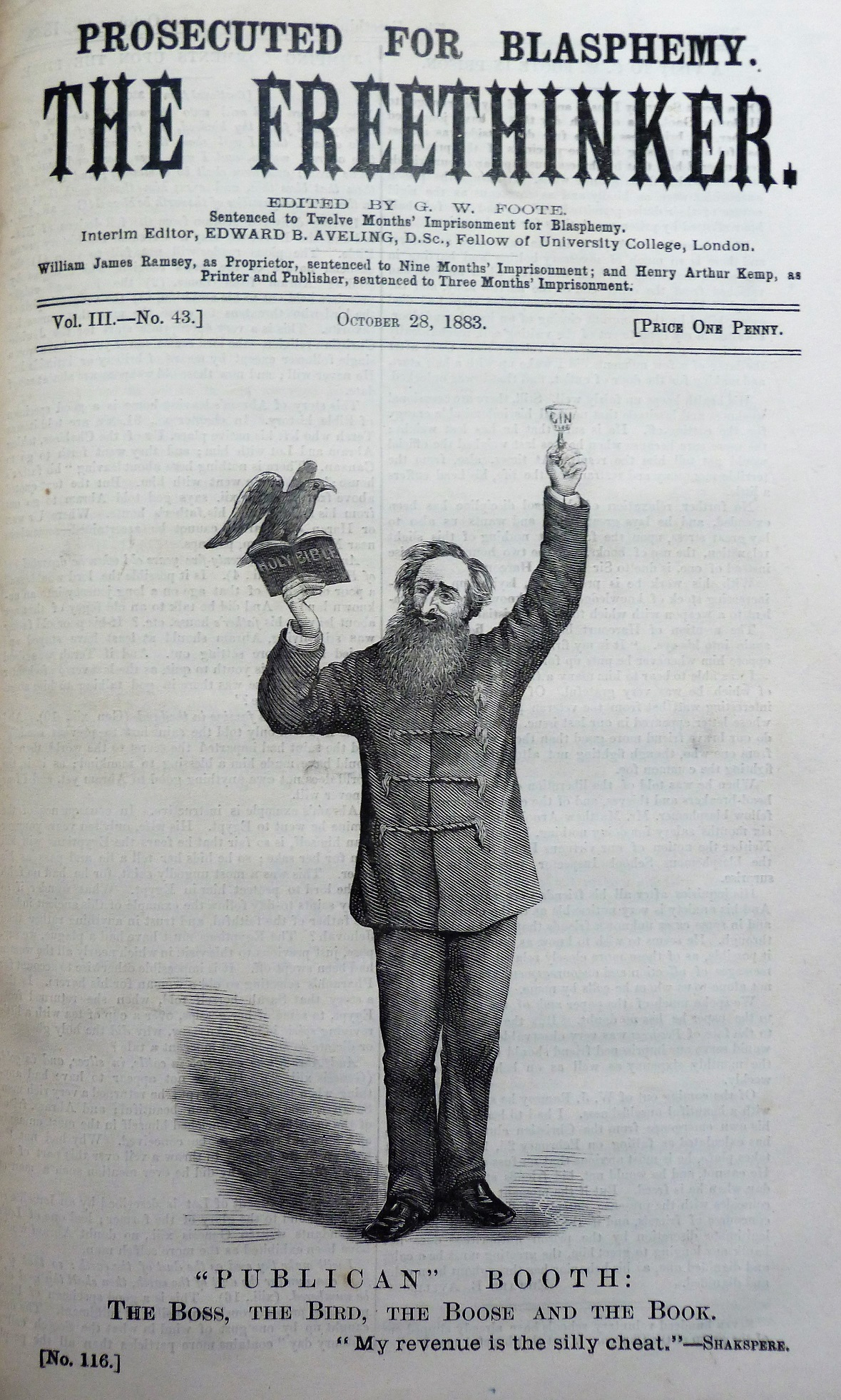
1883 cover of The Freethinker

In January 1868, Foote moved to London to work in a West End library, soon engaging in radical freethought. He founded a secular Sunday school and the Young Men's Secular Association at the Old Street Hall of Science in 1869, and began contributing to Charles Bradlaugh's National Reformer in 1870. He also served as secretary of the London Republican Club (1870) and the National Republican League (1871). In 1876, he opposed Bradlaugh's control over the secularist movement by starting his own paper, The Secularist, and in 1877, with G. J. Holyoake and Charles Watts, formed the British Secular Union.

Bradlaugh's exclusion from the House of Commons in 1880 prompted Foote to return to mainstream secularism. In May 1881, he launched The Freethinker, which featured satirical attacks on Christianity and infamous cartoons, leading to two prosecutions for blasphemy.

Foote was tried at the Old Bailey in March 1883, alongside William Ramsay, a shop manager, and William Kemp, a printer. He defended himself in court, arguing his crime was making blasphemy accessible to the working class while elite agnostics such as T. H. Huxley and Aubrey Beardsley faced no consequences. Foote received a 12-month sentence in Holloway prison, while Ramsey was given nine months and Kemp three months. However, an earlier charge heard before Lord Chief Justice Coleridge resulted in a divided jury. After serving his sentence, Foote, who was now a national figure, received a hero's welcome on release.

As Bradlaugh became more involved in parliament, Foote emerged as a key secularist leader during a period of declining popularity for the movement. He founded the London Secular Federation in 1888 and succeeded Bradlaugh as president of the National Secular Society (NSS) in 1890. Foote's succession marked a shift from direct parliamentary agitation to pressure group politics, focusing on humanitarian reforms and freethought issues. Under Foote, the NSS expanded its objectives to include "an extension of the moral law to animals, so as to secure them humane treatment and legal protection against cruelty". This led to cooperation between the NSS and the radical fringe of the animal defence movement, with Foote particularly supporting the Humanitarian League, led by Henry S. Salt.

A leading member of the Metropolitan Radical Federation, he championed free expression, opposed socialism, and grew disillusioned with what he saw as democratic mediocrity. In 1887, he debated socialism with Annie Besant. His defence of liberalism alienated many supporters who turned to socialism, leading to financial difficulties, conflicts with other leaders, and bankruptcy from 1901 to 1905. Despite these challenges, Foote played a significant role in sustaining secularist radicalism into the twentieth century.

Foote ran a publishing business from 1882, known later as the Pioneer Press, and edited The Freethinker until his death, along with other publications such as the Secularist, Liberal, Progress, Radical Leader, and Pioneer. He authored over eighty works, mainly polemical pamphlets, and his weekly editorial essays in The Freethinker were compiled as Flowers of Freethought (1893–4).

== Later life and death ==
In his later years, Foote suffered from bronchitis, leading the family to move from London to Westcliff-on-Sea in 1903. He died at his home at 39 Meteor Road on 17 October 1915 and was cremated at the City of London Crematorium in Ilford on 21 October. His death was related by Chapman Cohen in The Freethinker (31 October 1915):

When I saw him on the Friday (two days) before his death he said, "I have had another setback, but I am a curious fellow and may get all right again." But he looked the fact of death in the face with the same courage and determination that he faced Judge North many years ago. A few hours before he died he said calmly to those around him, "I am dying." And when the end came his head dropped back on the pillow, and with a quiet sigh, as of one falling to sleep, he passed away.

== Personal life ==
Foote's first marriage was to Henriette Mariane (born c. 1850), daughter of Adolph Heimann, a professor of German, on 20 March 1877. This marriage ended with her death in October of the same year. His second wife, Rosalia Martha (born c. 1862), daughter of Leopold Angel, a silversmith, supported his work but stayed in the background. They married on 12 April 1884, and had four children: a son named Francis, and three daughters named Helen, Florence, and Dorothy.

Foote was a cultured scholar with a deep knowledge of English literature, an admirer of Shakespeare, and a friend of George Meredith.

== Publications ==
- Foote, George William (1879). Secularism, The True Philosophy of Life: An Exposition and a Defence. Reprint, London: GW Foote & Co., 2016. ISBN 978-0-9508243-7-6
- Foote, George William (1885). The Jewish Life of Christ. London: Progressive Publishing Co.
- Foote, George William (1886). Prisoner for Blasphemy. London: Progressive Publishing Co. (Bradlaugh).
- Foote, George William (1889). Secularism and Theosophy: A Rejoinder to Mrs. Besant's Pamphlet. London: Progressive Publishing Co.
- Foote, George William (1889). Darwin on God. London: Progressive Publishing Co.
- Foote, George William (1889). The New Cagliostro: An Open Letter to Madame Blavatsky. London: Progressive Publishing Co.
