= National Reformer =

19th century British publication

The National Reformer was a secularist weekly publication in 19th-century Britain (1860–1893), noted for providing a longstanding "strong, radical voice" in its time, advocating atheism. Under the editorship of Charles Bradlaugh for the majority of its lifespan, each issue stated that "The editorial policy of the Paper is Republican, Atheistic, and Malthusian, but all opinions are freely admitted, provided only that they be expressed reasonably and in proper language."

== History ==
The journal was established in Sheffield in 1860, as an initiative by the Sheffield Secularists, on a prospectus describing its policy as "Atheistic in theology, Republican in politics, and Malthusian in social economy". The National Reformer was the official organ of the National Secular Society, which was established by Bradlaugh in 1866. He edited (or co-edited) the journal until his death in 1890, using it to publicise NSS activities among various other subjects of interest to freethinkers. Many leading booksellers refused to stock it, so the journal primarily circulated via independent sellers, local secular societies, and direct subscriptions.

In 1868 the Commissioners of the Inland Revenue acted against the National Reformer under the 1819 Blasphemous and Seditious Libels Act. Bradlaugh and John Stuart Mill campaigned to have the Act repealed and the case was allowed to fall. The following year, the 1819 Act was repealed.

Annie Besant became associated with the National Reformer in 1874, writing initially under the pen name "Ajax". Her full name joined Bradlaugh's on the masthead in 1881, however, and she co-edited the journal with him until October 1887, when they parted ways over her support of socialism (although Besant remained a contributor for a while after this time). Bradlaugh and Besant were prosecuted in 1877 for publications advocating birth control.

The journal reported extensively on Bradlaugh's struggles to take his seat as a Member of Parliament during the 1880s, with Special Extra Numbers appearing on several occasions to publish reports of his hearings in court. Among other things, the National Reformer is also notable for publishing James 'B. V.' Thomson's long poem "The City of Dreadful Night" across several issues in 1874.

After Bradlaugh's death the editorship was taken over by J. M. Robertson, with significant input from Hypatia Bradlaugh Bonner. However, in 1893 the journal ceased publication.
