= Charles Watts (secularist) =

English secularist (1836–1906)

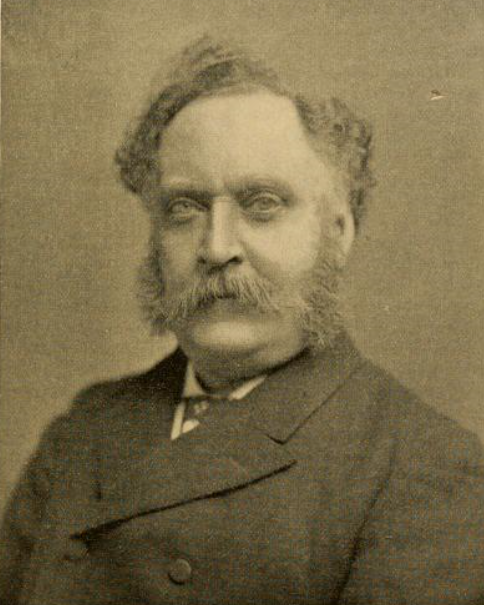
- Watts in 1894
- Born: 27 February 1836; Bristol, England
- Died: 16 February 1906 (aged 70); England
- Resting place: Highgate Cemetery
- Occupation(s): Writer, lecturer, publisher
- Relatives: Charles Albert Watts (son)

Charles Watts (27 February 1836 – 16 February 1906) was an English writer, lecturer and publisher, who was prominent in the secularist and freethought movements in both Britain and Canada.

== Life and career ==
He was born on 27 February 1836, in Bristol, to a family of Methodists, and showed precocious talents, giving his first lecture at age 14. At 16, he moved to London, and worked with his elder brother John Watts (1834–1866) in a printing office. Through this work the two brothers came into contact with freethinkers including Charles Southwell and Charles Bradlaugh. John Watts became an active proselytiser for secularism, and in 1863 was appointed editor of the National Reformer, a radical periodical founded by Bradlaugh, with Charles as assistant editor. In 1864, the brothers formed a publishing business, Watts & Co. He and his first wife, Mary Ann, had a son, Charles in 1858; in 1870 he married his second wife, the freethinker Kate Eunice Watts, with whom he had a daughter in 1875.

John Watts died from tuberculosis at age 32. Charles Watts took charge of the publishing business and toured the country, delivering hundreds of lectures on theological, social, and political issues. He declared himself an atheist and, with Bradlaugh and others, helped found the National Secular Society (NSS) in 1866. In 1876, he was appointed full-time editor and publisher of the National Reformer. He also wrote and published a wide range of pamphlets on secularism and republicanism, and wrote the first systematic history of freethought, eventually published in book form as Freethought: its Rise, Progress and Triumph. His wife, Kate Watts, often travelled with him and also wrote pamphlets, including The Education and Position of Woman and Christianity: Defective and Unnecessary.

In 1877, Charles Watts broke with Bradlaugh over the pamphlet The Fruits of Philosophy, which had been written by American physician and atheist Charles Knowlton, and which promoted birth control and discussed human sexuality. The pamphlet was published for the first time in Britain by James Watson's publishing company in 1845. In 1876, Charles Watts published the pamphlet and was prosecuted under the Obscene Publications Act. In protest of Watts' prosecution, Bradlaugh and Annie Besant, published the pamphlet it 1877 and were also prosecuted under the Obscene Publications Act, resulting in the infamous "Knowlton Trial" of Bradlaugh and Besant. Later Watts was released, resigned from the NSS, and, with George Holyoake and G. W. Foote, formed the British Secular Union, a short-lived rival group. Watts became editor of the Secular Review founded by Holyoake.

In 1882, he travelled for the first time to the United States to lecture, and also visited Canada, where he was invited to take up residence. He emigrated to Toronto in 1883, leaving his son Charles Albert Watts in charge of his publishing interests in Britain. Charles Watts then became the leader of the secularist movement in Canada, founding and editing Secular Thought in Toronto, and also regularly went on lecture tours of the US. Upon Bradlaugh's death, he returned to England in 1891, where his son had by then established the periodical Watts's Literary Guide (the forerunner of the New Humanist magazine) to promote secularist activities. Charles Watts rejoined the NSS and continued lecturing, as well as cooperating with Foote on the journal, The Freethinker. He returned to the US and Canada, with Foote, to lecture in 1896, and again visited the US in 1899.

He died in England, on 16 February 1906, aged 70, and is buried in a family grave on the eastern side of Highgate Cemetery. His son Charles remained active in the secularist movement, helping to develop the Rationalist Press Association; he was later buried with Watts.

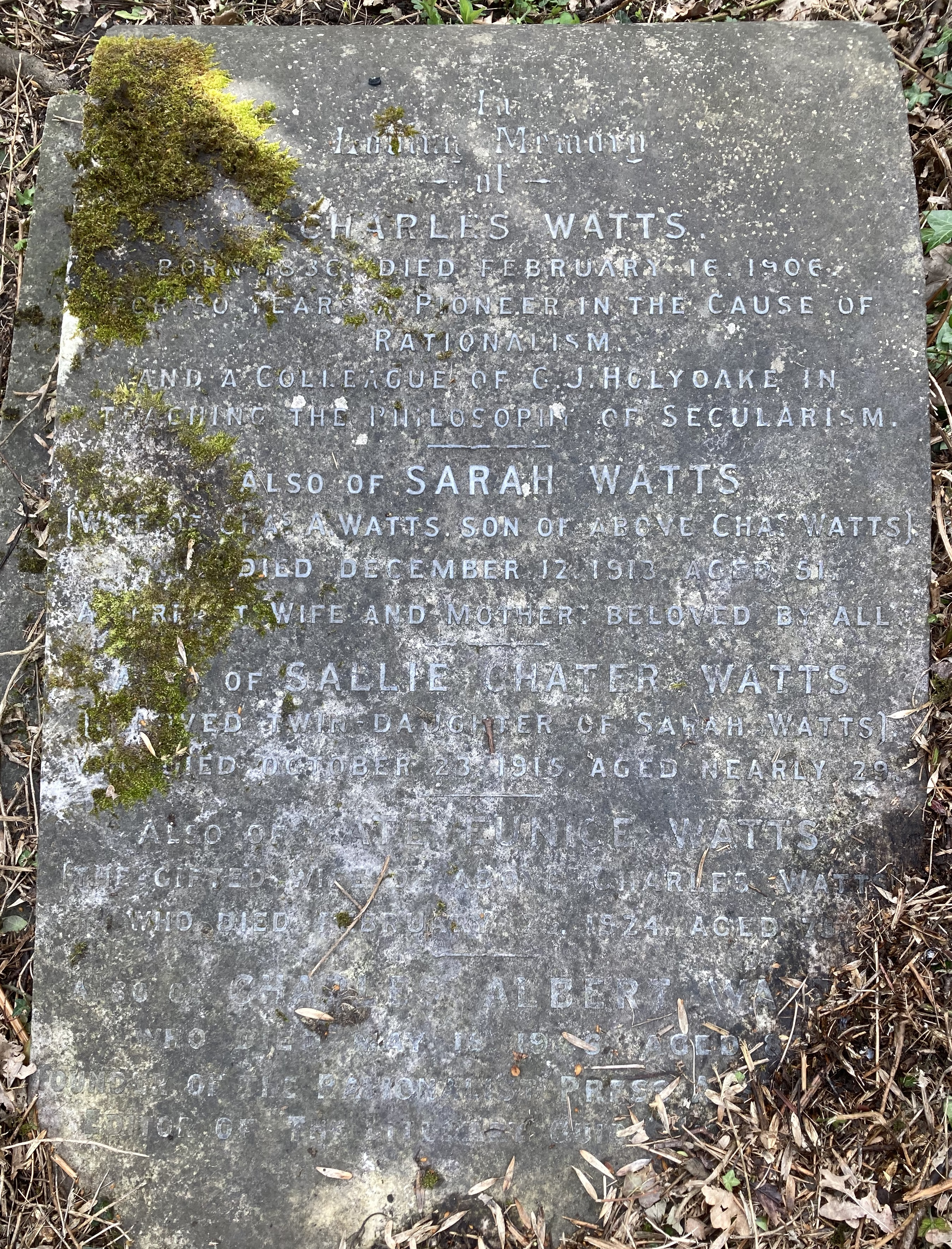
Family grave of Charles Watts in Highgate Cemetery

== Selected publications ==
- Evolution and Special Creation (1860)
- Christianity & Secularism: Which is the Better Suited to Meet the Wants of Mankind? (1882)
- The Origin, Nature and Destiny of Man (1893)

Non-profit organization positions
Preceded by New position	Secretary of the National Secular Society; 1866–1876	Succeeded by George Standring
