= Charles Knowlton =

American physician, atheist, writer and birth control advocate

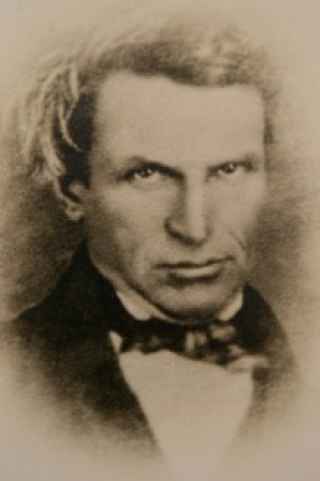
- Born: May 10, 1800
- Died: February 20, 1850 (aged 49)
- Known for: Advocating birth control
- Scientific career
- Fields: Physician

Charles Knowlton (May 10, 1800 – February 20, 1850) was an American medical doctor and writer.

== Education ==
Knowlton was born May 10, 1800, in Templeton, Massachusetts. His parents were Stephen and Comfort (White) Knowlton; his grandfather Ezekiel Knowlton was a captain in the revolution and a long-time state legislator. Knowlton attended local schools, then New Salem Academy. At age 18, he taught school briefly in Alstead, New Hampshire. As a young man, Knowlton was extremely concerned about his health. This led him to spend time with Richard Stuart, a "jack of all trades" in Winchendon who was experimenting with electricity. Knowlton married Stuart's daughter, Tabitha, and his condition was instantly cured.

Knowlton studied medicine with several area doctors, and attended two terms of 14-week "medical lectures" at Dartmouth. He supplemented his education by digging up and dissecting corpses. Knowlton was awarded his M.D. in 1824, moved to Hawley, Massachusetts, to begin his practice, and then served two months in the Worcester County jail for illegal dissection.

== Modern Materialism ==
While in jail, Knowlton formulated ideas that he eventually published as Elements of Modern Materialism in 1829. The book challenges the religious dualism of body and spirit, and Knowlton presents a psychological theory that has been described as "early behaviorism". Knowlton moved his family to North Adams, Massachusetts, in 1827, to be closer to a printer. In the summer of 1829, he took "one-horse load" of books down to New York city. He failed to sell any, but probably visited local freethinkers like Robert Dale Owen. Knowlton named his second son Stephen Owen, after his father and his friend. Knowlton was convinced Modern Materialism would make him as famous as John Locke, whom he quotes on the title page.

== The Fruits of Philosophy ==
In 1832, Knowlton moved his family and medical practice to Ashfield, Massachusetts. A year later, the town's new minister, Mason Grosvenor, began a campaign against "infidelity and licentiousness", targeting Knowlton as its source. Knowlton had written a little book entitled, The Fruits of Philosophy, or the Private Companion of Young Married People, and had been showing it to his patients. It contained a summary of what was then known about the physiology of conception, listed a number of methods to treat infertility and impotence, and explained a method of birth control he had developed: to wash out the vagina after intercourse with certain chemical solutions.

Knowlton was prosecuted and fined in Taunton, Massachusetts for the book. Abner Kneeland printed a second edition of Fruits of Philosophy in Boston in 1832, allowing it a wider circulation than the few closely guarded copies Knowlton had been lending to patients. This led to Knowlton's imprisonment in Cambridge at "hard labor" for three months, and was a central issue in Kneeland's blasphemy trial in 1838. Reverend Grosvenor filed a complaint against Knowlton in Franklin County, but after two juries failed to convict him, the charges were dropped. Grosvenor left Ashfield, and became a general agent for the Aetna insurance company.

== Later life ==
Knowlton became the leading country doctor in western Massachusetts, with a “ride” that covered thirty towns. He contributed several articles to the Boston Medical and Surgical Journal, as well as Kneeland's freethought paper, the Boston Investigator. Knowlton was an officer of several freethinking societies in New England and New York, and founded “The Friends of Mental Liberty” in Greenfield in 1845. In addition to affirming its members' right of "freely enquiring into the truth of all religions which claim to be a Revelation from some intelligent being superior to man", the group's Constitution declared that "Female members of this Society shall enjoy the same rights and privileges as male members."

Knowlton died on February 20, 1850. Twenty-seven years later, Charles Bradlaugh and Annie Besant were tried in London for publishing Knowlton's Fruits of Philosophy there. The book had been selling in moderate numbers in the interim, but the publicity from the Bradlaugh-Besant trial made it an overnight bestseller. Its circulation increased from an average of 700 per year to 125,000 in just one year. Besant subsequently published her own birth control manual.

== Writings ==
- Elements of Modern Materialism (Adams, Mass.: Oakey, 1829)
- Fruits of Philosophy (1891 Bradlaugh-Besant Reprint) Html version.

== See also ==
- Birth control movement in the United States
