= George Holyoake =

English secularist writer (1817–1906)

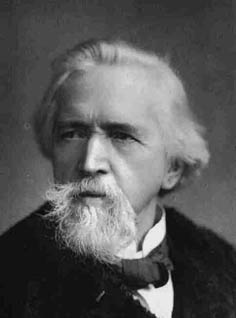
- Born: George Jacob Holyoake; 13 April 1817; Birmingham, Warwickshire, England
- Died: 22 January 1906 (aged 88); Brighton, Sussex, England
- Burial place: Highgate Cemetery, London
- Occupation: Newspaper editor
- Years active: 1846–1861
- Known for: Inventing the word secularism.
- Spouse: Eleanor Williams
- Relatives: Austin Holyoake (brother)

Signature
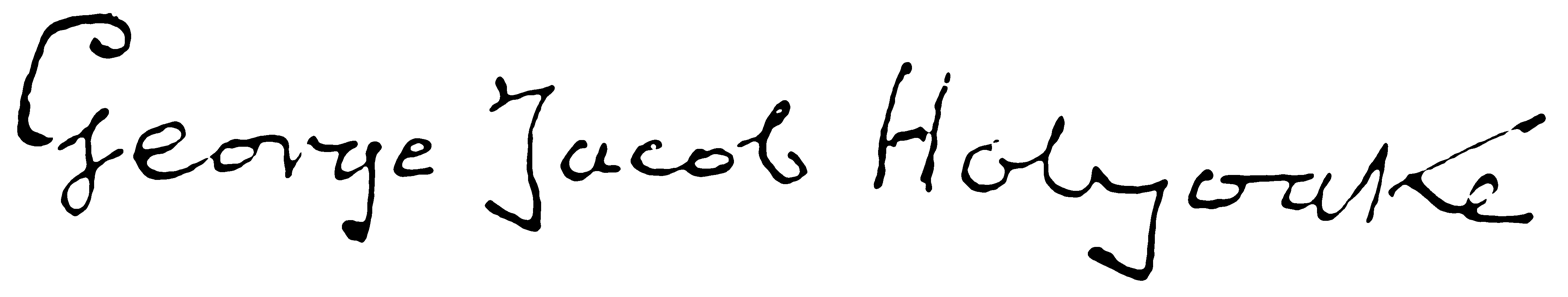

George Jacob Holyoake (13 April 1817 – 22 January 1906) was an English secularist, co-operator and newspaper editor. He coined the terms secularism in 1851 and "jingoism" in 1878. He edited a secularist paper, The Reasoner, from 1846 to June 1861, and a co-operative one, The English Leader, in 1864–1867.

== Early life ==
George Jacob Holyoake was born in Birmingham, where his father worked as a whitesmith and his mother as a button maker. He attended a dame school and a Wesleyan Sunday School, began working half-days at the same foundry as his father at the age of eight, and learnt his trade. At 18 he began attending lectures at the Birmingham Mechanics' Institute, where he encountered the socialist writings of Robert Owen and later became an assistant lecturer. He married Eleanor Williams in 1839 and decided to become a full-time teacher, but was rejected for his socialist views. Unable to teach full-time, Holyoake took a job as an Owenite social missionary. His first posting was in Worcester, but the following year he was transferred to a more important one in Sheffield.

== Owenism ==
Holyoake joined Charles Southwell in dissenting from the official Owenite policy that lecturers should take a religious oath to enable them to take collections on Sundays. Southwell had founded an atheist publication, Oracle of Reason, and was soon imprisoned on those grounds. Holyoake took over as editor, having moved to an atheist position as a result of his experiences.

Holyoake was influenced by the French philosopher of science, Auguste Comte, notable in sociology and famous for the doctrine of positivism. Comte had himself attempted to establish a secular "religion of humanity" to fulfil the cohesive function of traditional religion. Holyoake was an acquaintance of Harriet Martineau, who translated various works by Comte and was perhaps the first female sociologist. She wrote to him excitedly on reviewing Darwin's On the Origin of Species in 1859.

== Conviction for blasphemy ==
In 1842, Holyoake became one of the last persons convicted for blasphemy in a public lecture, held in April 1842 at the Cheltenham Mechanics' Institute, though this had no theological character and the incriminating words were merely a reply to a question addressed to him from the body of the meeting about poverty and the high cost of the Church of England. His answer included the words "the deity should be put on half-pay" and "Morality I regard, but I do not believe there is such a thing as God."

It took an intervention by supporters to save Holyoake from being walked in chains from Cheltenham to Gloucester Gaol, and a formal complaint was made to the Home Secretary, which was upheld. Holyoake was well supported by the Cheltenham Free Press at the time, but he was attacked in the Cheltenham Chronicle and the Examiner. Those at the lecture, the second in a series, moved and carried a motion "that free discussion was equally beneficial in the departments of politics, morals and religion." In 1842 Holyoake and the socialist Emma Martin formed the Anti-Persecution Union to support free thinkers in danger of arrest.

== Secularism ==
Holyoake nonetheless underwent six months' imprisonment and editorship of the Oracle changed hands. After the paper closed at the end of 1843, Holyoake founded a more moderate one, The Movement, which survived into 1845. Holyoake also founded The Reasoner, where he developed the concept of secularism. Among the causes he supported through the paper was that of Thomas Pooley, who was imprisoned for twenty-one months on a blasphemy charge in 1857. It was followed by the Secular Review in August 1876. He was the last person indicted for publishing an unstamped newspaper, but the prosecution was dropped when the tax was withdrawn.

He retained his disbelief in God, but after the Oracle soon came to see "atheism" as a negative term, preferring "secularism". He then adopted the term "agnostic", when it appeared.

In the 1850s Holyoake and Charles Southwell were lecturing in East London. Harriet Law, then a Baptist, began debating with them, and in the process changed her beliefs. She "saw the light of reason" in 1855 and became a supporter of Holyoake and a prominent secular speaker.

After an 1877 split with Charles Bradlaugh and Annie Besant, leaders of the National Secular Society (NSS), Holyoake, Charles Watts and Harriet Law founded the British Secular Union, which remained active until 1884.

On 6 March 1881, Holyoake was a speaker at the opening of Leicester Secular Society's Secular Hall in Humberstone Gate, along with Harriet Law, Annie Besant and Charles Bradlaugh. He chaired the Rationalist Press Association in 1899–1906.

== Co-operative movement ==
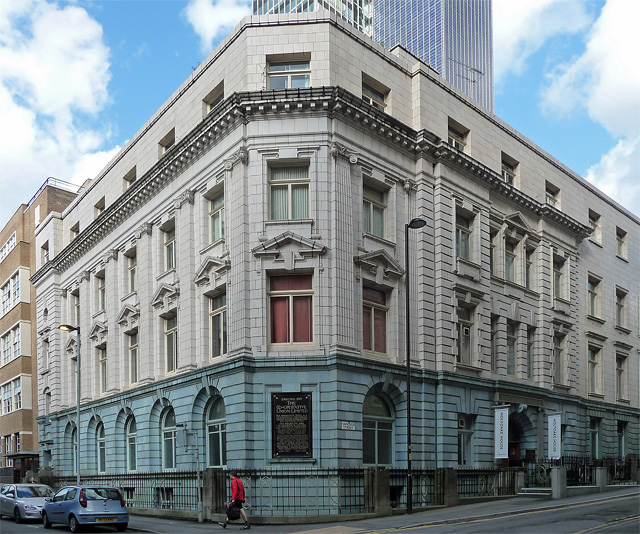
Holyoake House in Manchester, home to Co-operatives UK and the Co-operative College.

Holyoake's later years were mainly spent on the working-class co-operative movement. He served as President for the first day of the 1887 Co-operative Congress. He wrote a history of the Rochdale Pioneers (1857), The History of Co-operation in England (1875; revised ed. 1906) and The Co-operative Movement of To-day (1891). He also published (1892) an autobiography entitled Sixty Years of an Agitator's Life, and in 1905 two volumes of reminiscences, Bygones Worth Remembering.

Holyoake died in Brighton, Sussex, on 22 January 1906, and was buried in the eastern section of Highgate Cemetery in London. The grave lies in a north-east section, off the main paths, and is not readily accessible, but visible between graves on the east side of the main central-north path, behind George Eliot's grave.

The Co-operative Movement decided to build a lasting monument to him: a permanent home for the Co-operative Union in Manchester. Holyoake House was opened in 1911 and also houses the National Co-operative Archive. A second collection is held at Bishopsgate Library.

== Other aspects ==
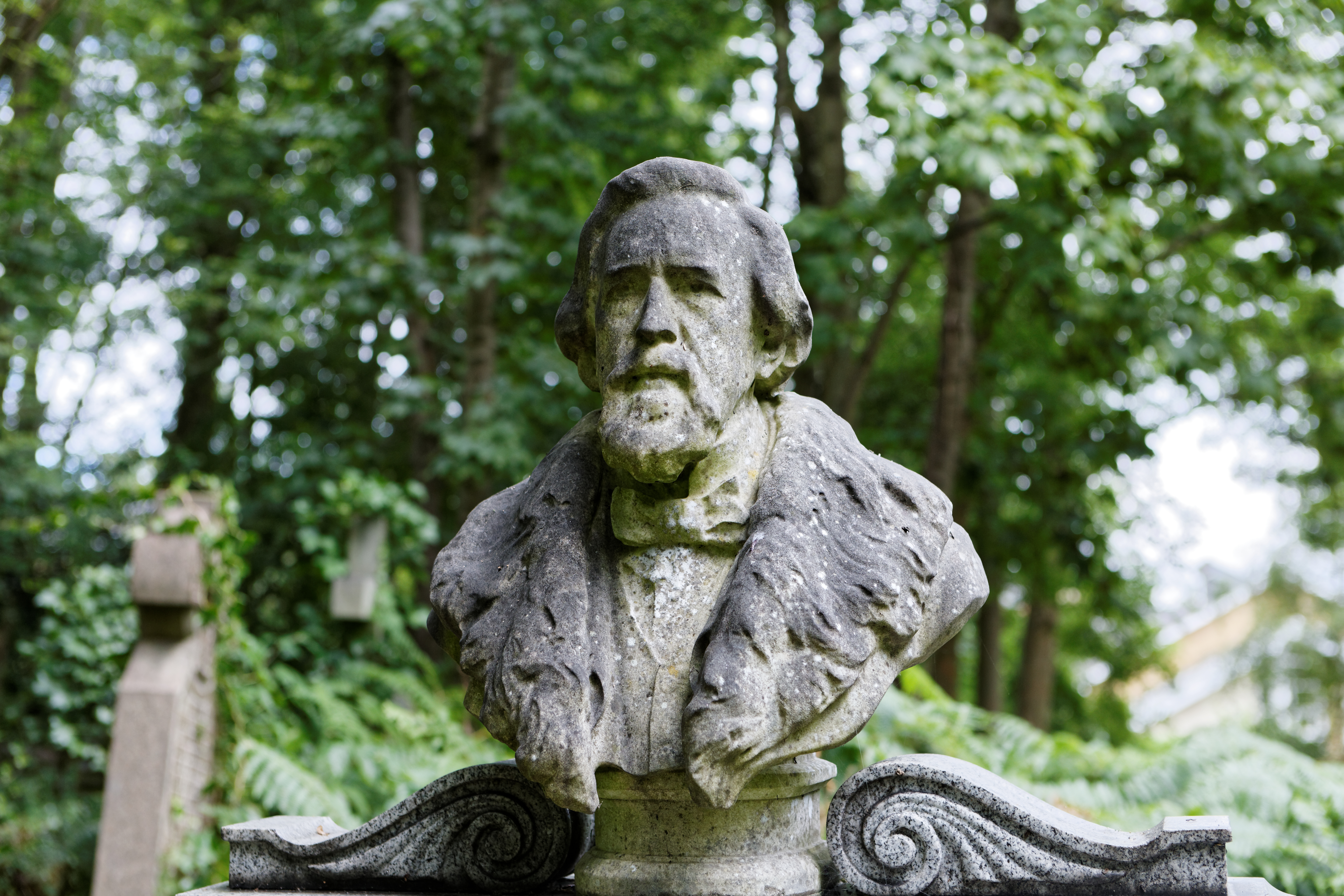
The grave of George Holyoake, Highgate Cemetery, London

Holyoake coined the term "jingoism" in a letter to The Daily News on 13 March 1878, referring to the patriotic song "By Jingo" by G. W. Hunt, popularised by the music hall singer G. H. MacDermott. Referring back to this he wrote, "I had certainly intended to mark, by a convenient name, a new species of patriots... [whose] characteristic was a war-urging pretentiousness which discredited the silent, resolute, self-defensiveness of the British people."

Holyoake was the uncle of an independent MP and convicted fraudster, Horatio Bottomley, and contributed to the cost of Bottomley's upkeep after he was orphaned in 1865. The New Zealand Prime Minister Keith Holyoake was related to him.

== Memorials ==
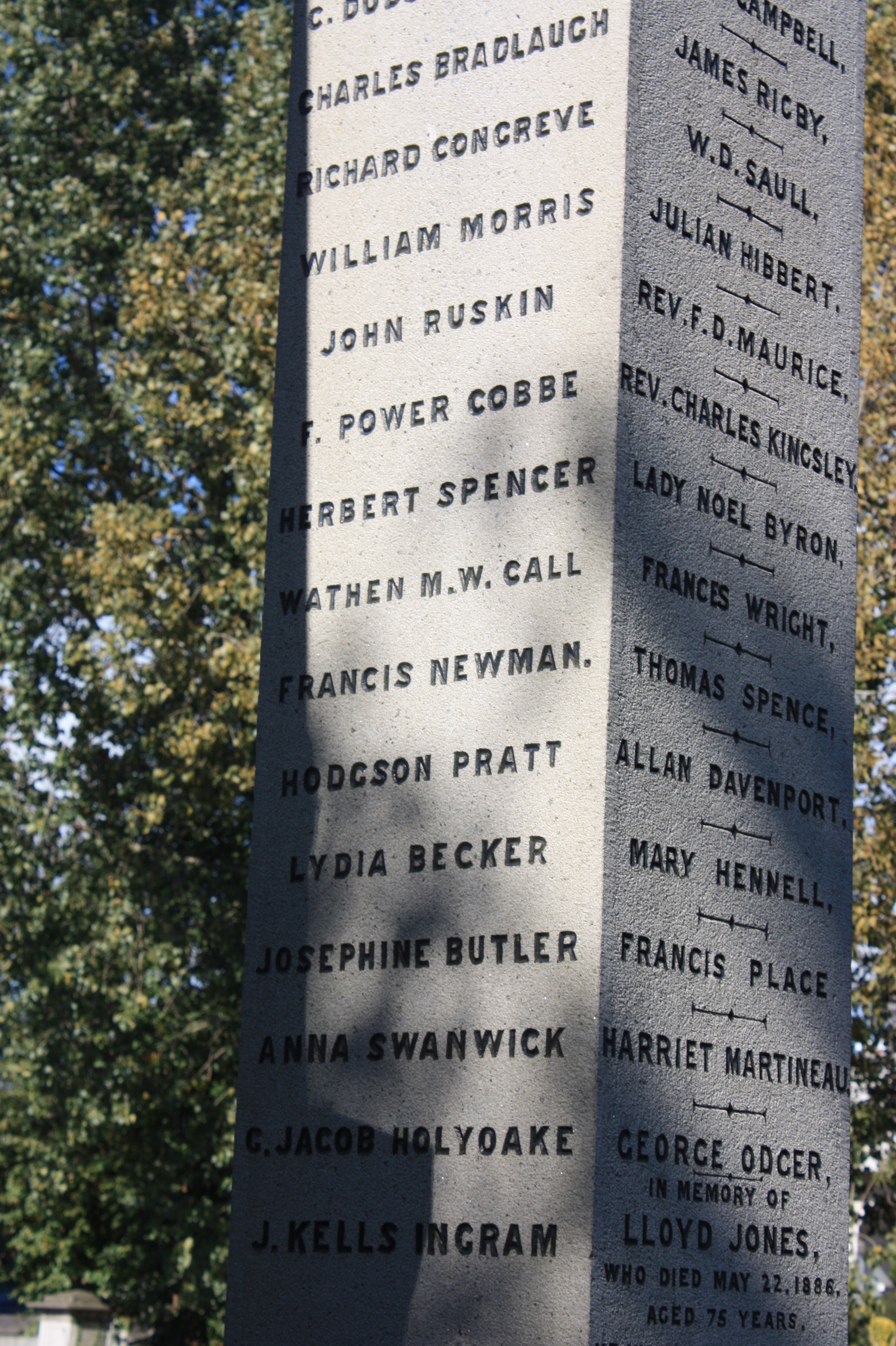
Holyoake's name on the lower section of the Reformers memorial, Kensal Green Cemetery

Holyoake is listed on the south face of the Reformers' Memorial in London's Kensal Green Cemetery.

The Cooperative Union Limited Holyoake House, Hanover Street, Manchester, Greater Manchester, M60 0AS has Holyoake commemorated on the side of the building as “one of the pioneers of Co-operation who for nearly 70 years was a strenuous worker for liberty and reform”.

The National Secular Society unveiled a blue plaque commemorating Holyoake on Friday 17 August 2018. It is mounted on the front of a newsagents' at 4 Woburn Walk in Bloomsbury, London, WC1H 0JL, as part of the Marchmont Association's scheme of local history commemorative plaques.

Holyoake Road in Headington, Oxford, Holyoake Walk in Ealing, London, Holyoake Terrace in Penrith, Cumbria and Holyoake Terrace in Sevenoaks, Kent, are named after George Holyoake.

== Publications ==
- Rationalism: A Treatise for the Times (London: J. Watson, 1845)
- The History of the Last Trial by Jury for Atheism in England: A Fragment of Autobiography (London: J. Watson, 1850)
- Christianity and Secularism Report of a Public Discussion Between Rev. Brewin and G. J. Holyoake (London: Ward & Co, 1853)
- Rudiments of Public Speaking and Debate or, Hints on the Application of Logic (New York: McElrath & Barker, 1853); 9th edition, revised & enlarged. 1904.
- The Trial of Theism (London, 1858)
- The Principles of Secularism (London, 1870)
- The History of Co-operation in England: Its Literature and its Advocates (Volume I Volume II) (London: Trübner & Co, 1875)
- English Secularism: A Confession of Belief (Chicago: The Open Court Publishing Company, 1896)

== See also ==
- Thomas Aikenhead – the last person executed for blasphemy in Britain
