= Charles Bradlaugh =

British politician and atheist (1833–1891)

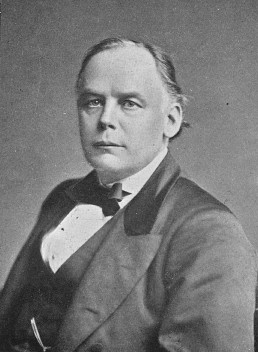

Member of Parliament for Northampton
- In office 1880–1891
- Preceded by: Charles George Merewether
- Succeeded by: Sir Moses Philip Manfield

Personal details
- Born: 26 September 1833 Hoxton, England, UK
- Died: 30 January 1891 (aged 57) London, England, UK
- Resting place: Brookwood Cemetery, Surrey
- Party: Liberal
- Relatives: Hypatia Bradlaugh (daughter)
- Known for: Founding the NSS (National Secular Society)

Charles Bradlaugh (/ˈbrædlɔː/; 26 September 1833 – 30 January 1891) was an English politician and atheism activist. He founded the National Secular Society in 1866, 15 years after George Holyoake had coined the term "secularism" in 1851.

In 1880, Bradlaugh was elected as the Liberal MP for Northampton. His attempt to affirm as an atheist ultimately led to his temporary imprisonment, fines for voting in the House of Commons illegally, and a number of by-elections at which Bradlaugh regained his seat on each occasion. He was finally allowed to take an oath in 1886. Eventually, a parliamentary bill which he proposed became law in 1888, which allowed members of both Houses of Parliament to affirm, if they so wished, when being sworn in. The new law resolved the issue for witnesses in civil and criminal court cases.

== Early life ==
Born in Hoxton (an area in the East End of London), Bradlaugh was the son of a solicitor's clerk. He left school at the age of eleven and then worked as an office errand-boy and later as a clerk to a coal merchant. After a brief spell as a Sunday school teacher, he became disturbed by discrepancies between the Thirty-nine Articles of the Anglican Church and the Bible. When he expressed his concerns, the local vicar, John Graham Packer, accused him of atheism and suspended him from teaching. He was thrown out of the family home and was taken in by Eliza Sharples Carlile, the widow of Richard Carlile, who had been imprisoned for printing Thomas Paine's The Age of Reason. Soon Bradlaugh was introduced to George Holyoake, who organised Bradlaugh's first public lecture as an atheist.

At the age of 17, he published his first pamphlet, A Few Words on the Christian's Creed. However, refusing financial support from fellow freethinkers, he enlisted as a soldier with the Seventh Dragoon Guards hoping to serve in India and make his fortune. Instead he was stationed in Dublin. In 1853, he was left a legacy by a great-aunt and used it to purchase his discharge from the army.

== Activism and journalism ==
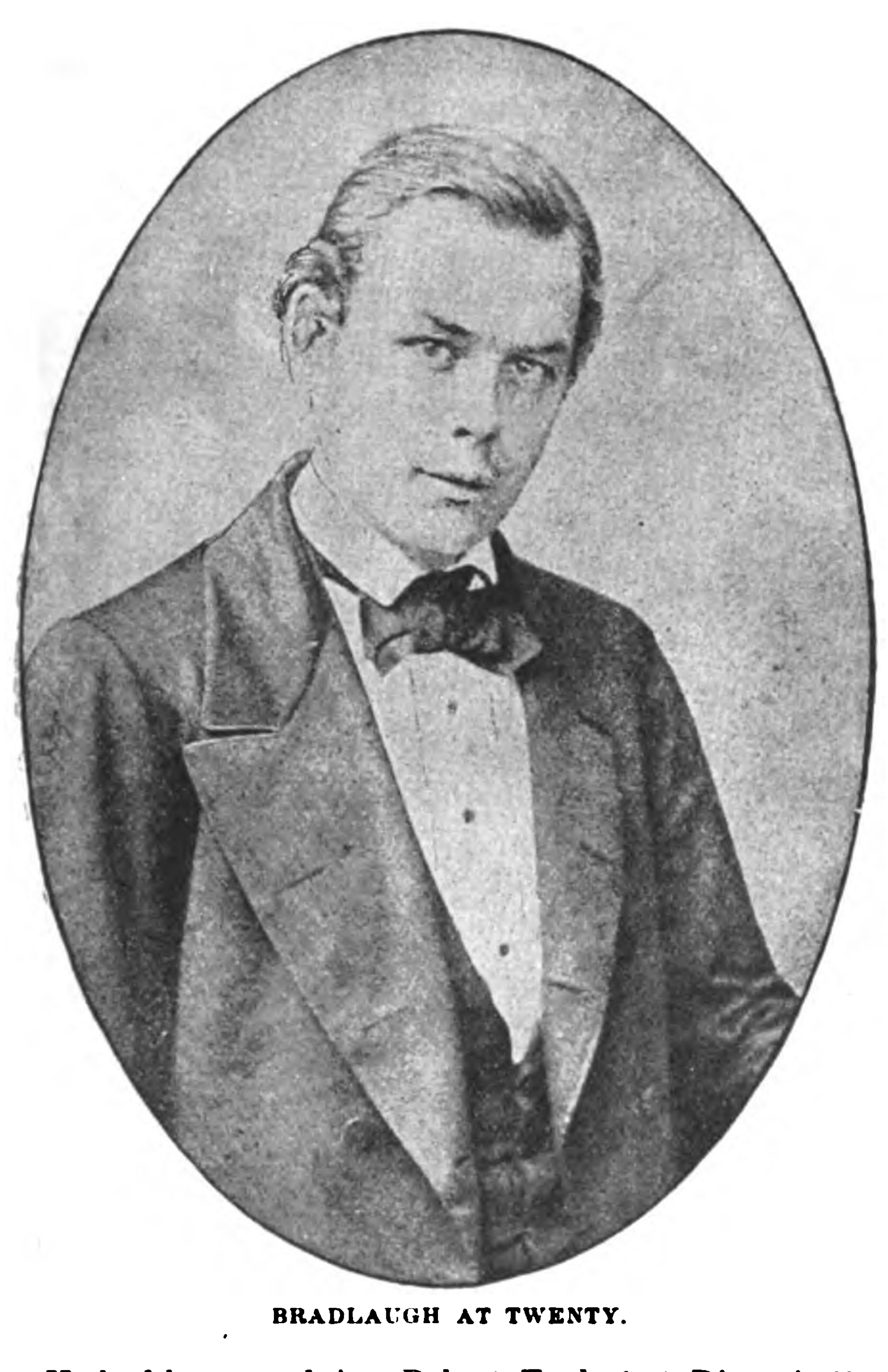

Bradlaugh returned to London in 1853 and took a post as a solicitor's clerk. By this time he was a convinced freethinker and in his free time he became a pamphleteer and writer about "secularist" ideas, adopting the pseudonym "Iconoclast" to protect his employer's reputation. He gradually attained prominence in a number of liberal or radical political groups or societies, including the Reform League, Land Law Reformers, and Secularists.

He was President of the London Secular Society from 1858. In 1860 he became editor of the secularist newspaper, the National Reformer, and in 1866 co-founded the National Secular Society, in which Annie Besant who joined in 1874 later became his close associate. In 1868, the Reformer was prosecuted by the British Government for blasphemy and sedition. Bradlaugh was eventually acquitted on all charges, but fierce controversy continued both in the courts and in the press.

A decade later (1877), Bradlaugh and Besant set up the Freethought Publishing Company and decided to republish the American Charles Knowlton's pamphlet advocating birth control, The Fruits of Philosophy, or the Private Companion of Young Married People, whose previous British publisher, Charles Watts, had already been successfully prosecuted for obscenity. The two activists were both tried in 1877, and Charles Darwin refused to give evidence in their defence, pleading ill-health, but at the time writing to Bradlaugh that his testimony would have been of little use to them because he opposed birth control. They were sentenced to heavy fines and six months' imprisonment, but their conviction was overturned by the Court of Appeal on the basis that the prosecution had not set out the precise words which were alleged to be obscene in the indictment. The Malthusian League was founded as a result of the trial to promote birth control. He was a member of a Masonic lodge in Bolton, although he was later to resign due to the nomination of the Prince of Wales as Grand Master.

On 6 March 1881 he spoke at the opening of Leicester Secular Society's new Secular Hall in Humberstone Gate, Leicester. The other speakers were George Jacob Holyoake, Annie Besant and Harriet Law.

Charles Bradlaugh challenged Hugh Price Hughes, a leading Methodist minister, to a debate on the merits of Christianity. Hughes accepted, on condition that each of them bring 100 individuals whose lives had been changed by their teaching. The debate was never held.

== Politics ==
Bradlaugh was an advocate of trade unionism, republicanism, and universal suffrage, but opposed socialism. His anti-socialism was divisive and many secularists who became socialists left the secularist movement because of its identification with Bradlaugh's liberal individualism. He was a supporter of Irish Home Rule and backed France during the Franco-Prussian War. He took a strong interest in India.

== Parliament ==
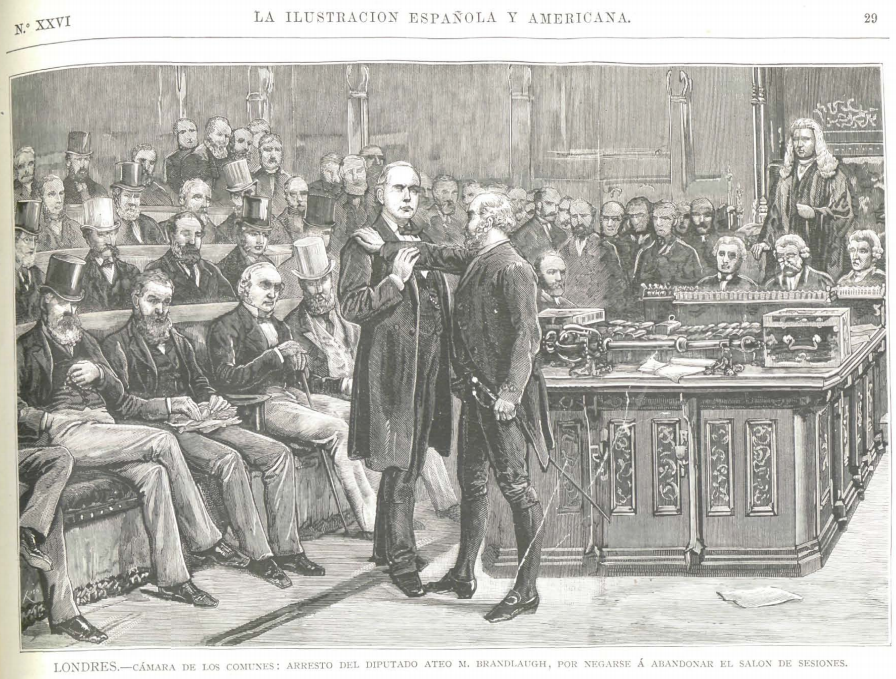
Bradlaugh's arrest in Parliament

After defeats in 1868 and 1874, Bradlaugh was elected Member of Parliament for Northampton in 1880. To take his seat and become an active Parliamentarian, he needed to signify his allegiance to the Crown and on 3 May Bradlaugh came to the Table of the House of Commons, bearing a letter to the Speaker "begging respectfully" to replace the religious Oath of Allegiance with a mere "affirmation", citing the Evidence Amendment Acts of 1869 and 1870. Speaker Brand declared that he had "grave doubts" and asked the House for its judgment. Lord Frederick Cavendish, for the Government, moved that a Select Committee be set up to decide whether persons entitled to make a solemn affirmation in court were also allowed to affirm instead of taking the Parliamentary oath.

=== First Select Committee ===
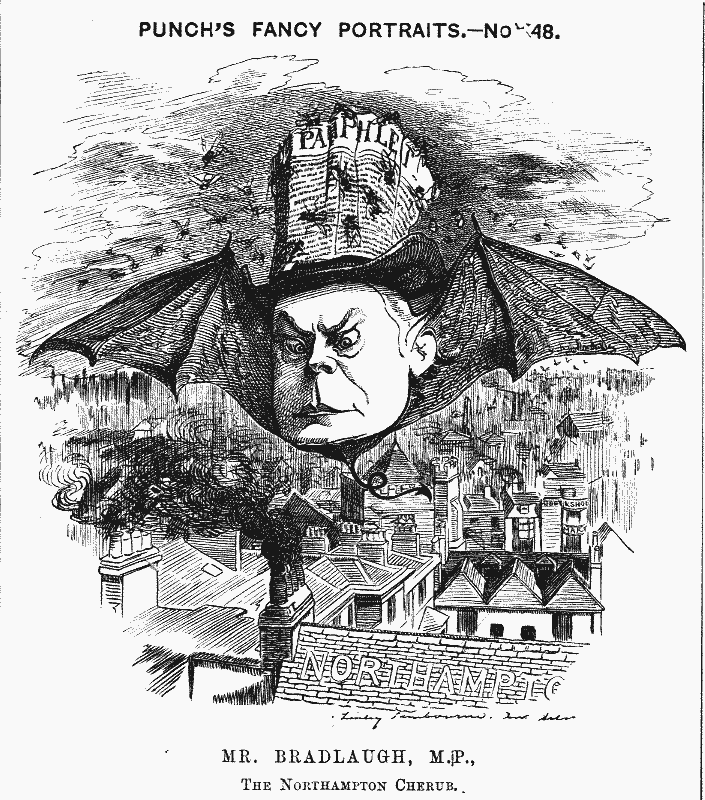
Caricature from Punch, 1881 – "Mr. Bradlaugh, M.P., The Northampton Cherub"

Bradlaugh's pamphlet "A plea for atheism", from the Conway Hall digital collections

This Select Committee held only one brief meeting on 12 May 1880. The Attorney General, Sir Henry James, moved that anyone entitled to affirm to give evidence in court was also entitled to affirm instead of taking the Oath in Parliament. Sir John Holker, Conservative MP for Preston, moved an amendment to reverse this finding, and the committee split down the middle with eight members (seven Conservatives and Charles Henry Hopwood, Liberal MP for Stockport) supporting the amendment and eight (all Liberals) opposing it; on the casting vote of the chairman Spencer Horatio Walpole the amendment was carried. Bradlaugh was not surprised that the Committee had gone against him, and notified the Speaker that he would attend to take the Oath on 21 May.

=== Attempts to take the Oath ===
To explain his actions, Bradlaugh wrote an open letter to The Times which was published on the morning of 21 May. He said it would have been hypocritical to voluntarily take the oath "including words of idle and meaningless character" without protest when another form of words was available, but now that the Select Committee had ruled he must, he would do so and "regard myself as bound not by the letter of its words, but by the spirit which the affirmation would have conveyed had I been permitted to use it."

Bradlaugh's letter was regarded as a direct provocation by his opponents, and when he came to the table, Sir Henry Drummond Wolff rose to object to the administration of the Oath to Bradlaugh. Speaker Brand allowed him to object, and Wolff argued that the Evidence Amendment Acts referred to by Bradlaugh only allowed an affirmation to one who regarded the oath as meaningless, so the House should not allow Bradlaugh to take it. Prime Minister William Gladstone, alerted to the fact that a protest was possible, moved to set up a second Select Committee to examine whether it was possible to interfere with a Member wishing to take the oath. Gladstone's amendment was carried by 289 to 214.

=== Second Select Committee ===
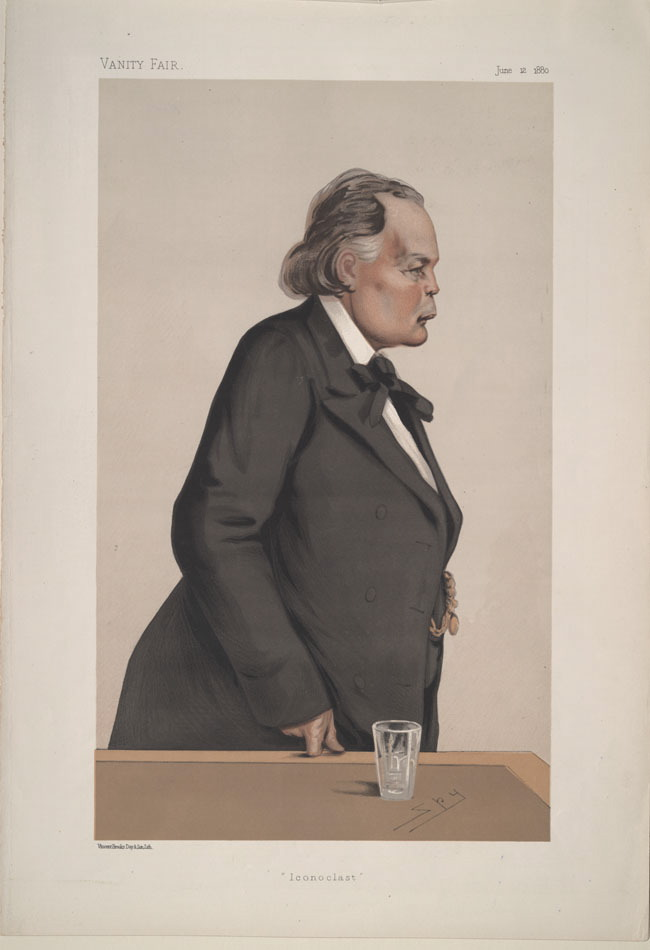
Bradlaugh by Spy in Vanity Fair, 1887

The Select Committee began deliberating on 1 June 1880, when it considered a paper put in by Sir Thomas Erskine May, the Clerk of the House. Sir Thomas found several precedents for Members disabled to sit for refusing to take the Oath, together with Quaker MP Joseph Pease who was permitted to affirm, and Jewish MPs Baron Lionel de Rothschild and David Salomons who were eventually allowed to take the Oath while omitting the words "on the true faith of a Christian".

On the following day, Erskine May and Bradlaugh himself were questioned by the Committee, with Bradlaugh arguing that, should the Committee decide he had no right to affirm, he would take the oath and regard it as binding on his conscience. When the Committee decided its report, it agreed by one vote an amendment declaring that the House could "and, in the opinion of your Committee, ought to" prevent Bradlaugh from taking the Oath. It also added (by 12 votes to 9) that it would be possible for an action in the High Court of Justice to test whether an affirmation was lawful, and therefore recommended that if Bradlaugh sought to affirm, he should be allowed to do so in order that such an action be brought to clarify the law. The second Select Committee had effectively reversed the outcome of the first.

When it was known that this was the likely outcome of the Select Committee, Bradlaugh's fellow Northampton MP Henry Labouchère initiated a debate on a motion to allow Bradlaugh to affirm. Sir Hardinge Giffard moved an amendment that Bradlaugh be not permitted to take either the Oath or make an affirmation. After two days of debate, Giffard's amendment was carried by 275 to 230, a defeat which surprised Gladstone. The majority comprised 210 Conservatives, 34 Liberals and 31 Irish Home Rulers; supporting Bradlaugh were 218 Liberals, 10 Home Rulers and 2 Conservatives. On the next day, Bradlaugh came to the Table claiming to take the Oath; in consequence of the previous night's vote the Speaker ordered him to withdraw.

Bradlaugh was permitted to address the House from behind the Bar (which was technically outside the Chamber), and treated the occasion as his maiden speech. He based his argument on law, contending that he was not legally disqualified, and asking "as one man against six hundred" for the same justice he would receive in the Courts. Although well received, the speech was too late to reverse the decision, and Henry Labouchère was forced to withdraw a motion to rescind it.

=== Imprisonment ===
The initial difficulty is in defining the word "God". It is equally impossible to intelligently affirm or deny any proposition unless there is at least an understanding, on the part of the affirmer or denier, of the meaning of every word used in the proposition. To me the word "God" standing alone is a word without meaning. ... So long as the word "God" is undefined I do not deny "God".

— Charles Bradlaugh

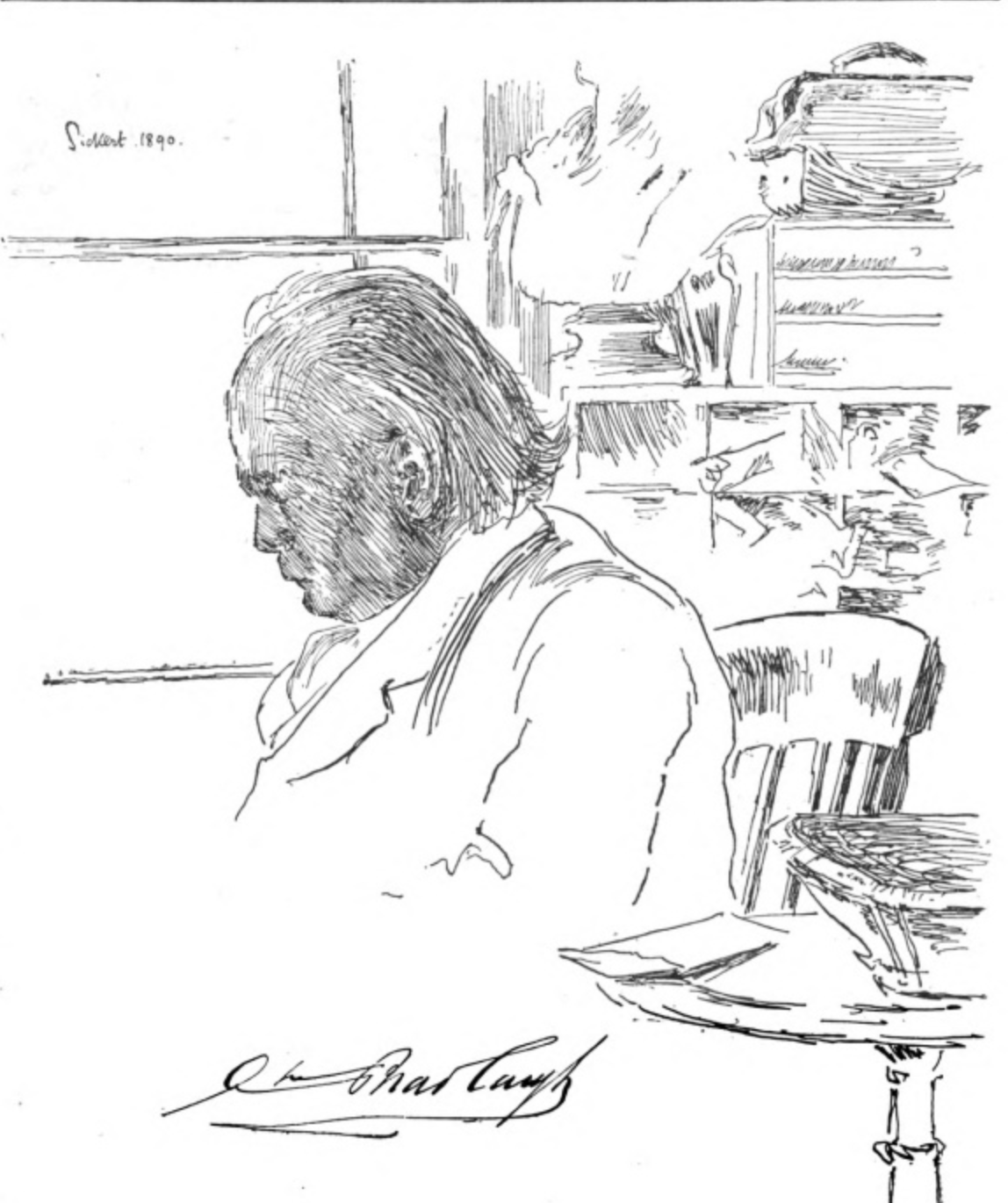
A portrait of Charles Bradlaugh in 1890, drawn by artist Walter Sickert, from the first issue of The Whirlwind

At that point Bradlaugh was summoned back to the table to be told the outcome of the debate; having relayed it, the Speaker then ordered him to withdraw. Bradlaugh "respectfully refused" to obey an order of the House which was "against the law". The Conservative leader Sir Stafford Northcote successfully moved a motion that Bradlaugh be required to withdraw (agreed on a division by 326 to 38, Liberal MPs being unwilling to challenge a motion which sustained the House's legal authority) but Bradlaugh "positively refused to obey". David Erskine, the Serjeant-at-arms, was sent for and led Bradlaugh out to the Bar of the House, but Bradlaugh then immediately returned to the table claiming to take the Oath. At this Sir Stafford Northcote moved that Bradlaugh be taken into custody. The House agreed, on a division by 274 votes to 7 and Bradlaugh was taken to the small prison cell located under Big Ben in the Clock Tower.

Lord Randolph Churchill roused the Conservatives by leading resistance to Bradlaugh.

Bradlaugh later returned to the House, but because Members had to take the oath before being allowed to take their seats, he effectively forfeited his seat in Parliament once he cast a vote in early 1881. His seat fell vacant and a by-election was declared. Bradlaugh was re-elected by Northampton four times in succession as the dispute continued. Supporting Bradlaugh were William Ewart Gladstone, T. P. O'Connor and George Bernard Shaw as well as hundreds of thousands of people who signed a public petition. Opposing his right to sit were the Conservative Party, the Archbishop of Canterbury, and other leading figures in the Church of England and Roman Catholic Church.

On at least one occasion, Bradlaugh was escorted from the House by police officers. In 1883 he took his seat and voted three times before being fined £1,500 for voting illegally. A bill allowing him to affirm was defeated in Parliament.

In 1886 Bradlaugh was finally allowed to take the oath, and did so at the risk of prosecution under the Parliamentary Oaths Act. Two years later, in 1888, he secured passage of a new Oaths Act, which enshrined into law the right of affirmation for members of both Houses, as well as extending and clarifying the law as it related to witnesses in civil and criminal trials (the Evidence Amendment Acts of 1869 and 1870 had proved unsatisfactory, though they had given relief to many who would otherwise have been disadvantaged). Bradlaugh spoke in Parliament about the London matchgirls strike of 1888.

== Personal life ==
On 5 June 1855, at St Philip's, Stepney, Bradlaugh married Susannah Lamb Hooper (1831–1877), daughter of Abraham Hooper, a plasterer. Their daughter Alice was born in 1856. A second daughter, Hypatia Bradlaugh Bonner (1858–1935), was named after Hypatia, the Greek philosopher, mathematician, astronomer and teacher. In 1859 they had a son, Charles Bradlaugh, who died in July 1870, aged ten, some two months after his parents had separated.

A longstanding friendship between Bradlaugh and Elizabeth Holyoake (died 1865) led to rumours that Bradlaugh, not William Bottomley, Elizabeth's husband, was the biological father of Horatio Bottomley (1860-1933)—a suggestion that Bottomley, in later life, was prone to encourage. The evidence is circumstantial, mainly based on the marked facial resemblance between Bradlaugh and Bottomley.

== Death ==
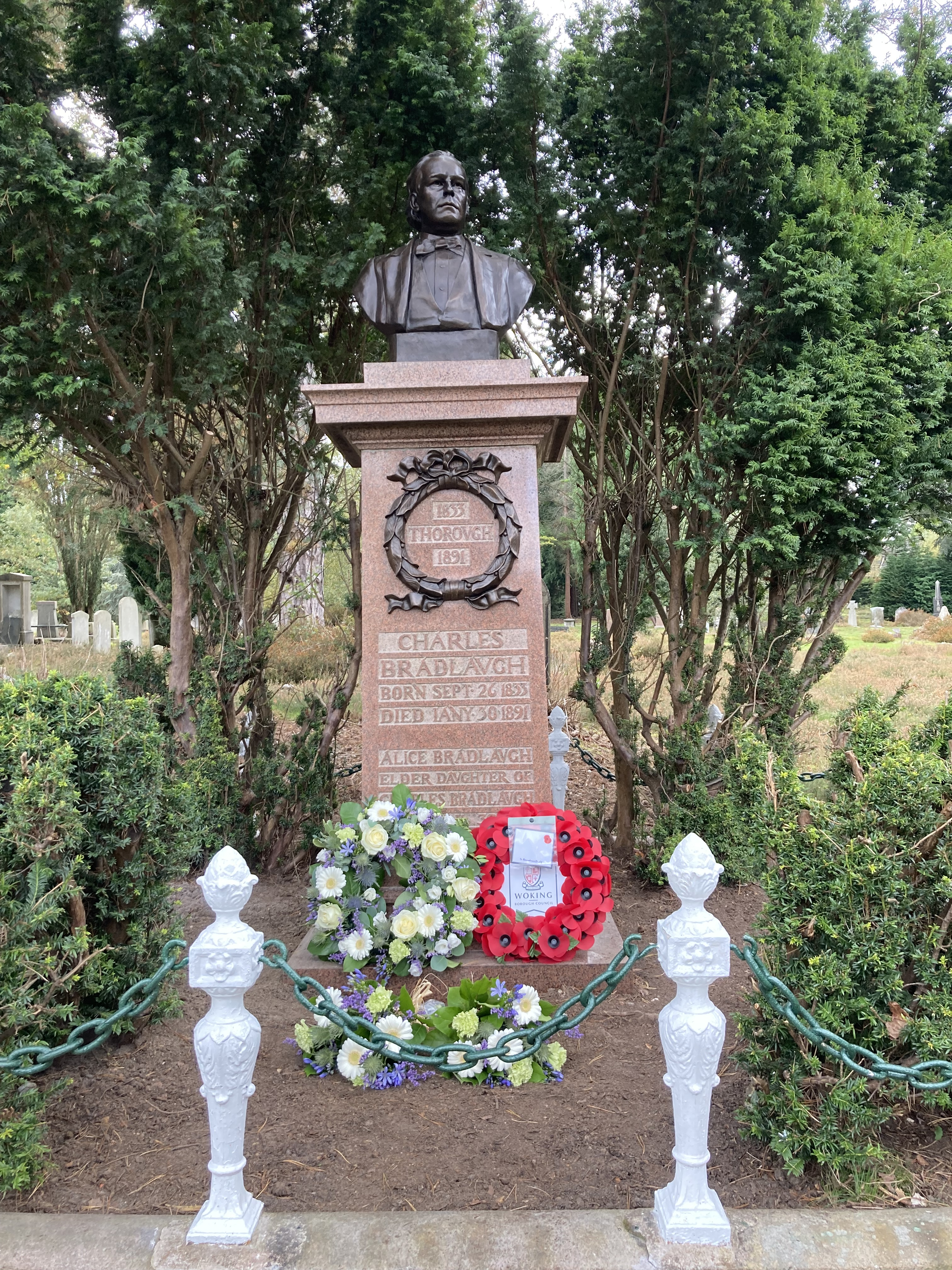
Bradlaugh's grave in Brookwood Cemetery, Surrey

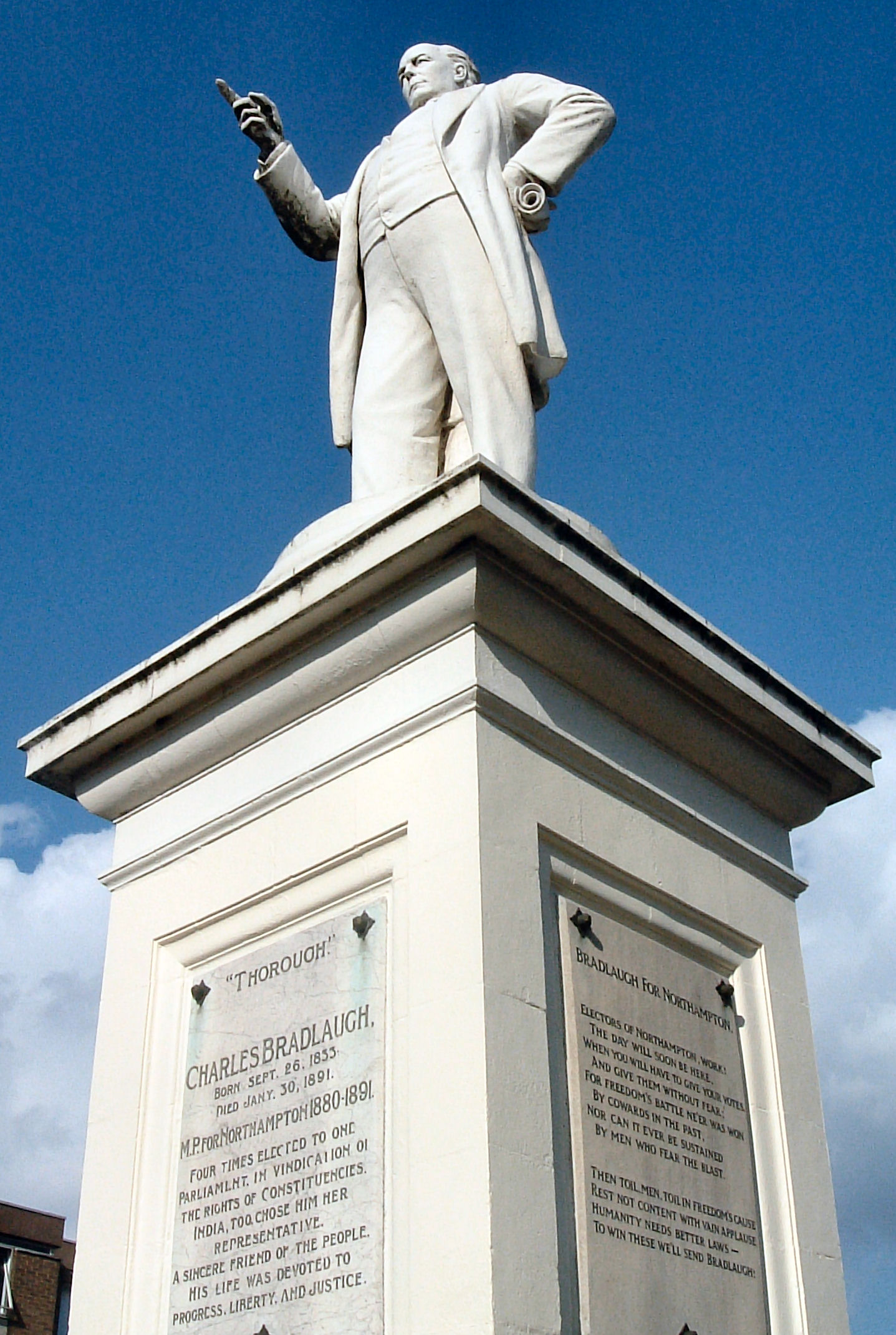
Bradlaugh's statue at Abington Square, Northampton

Bradlaugh died on 30 January 1891. His funeral was attended by 3,000 mourners, including a 21-year-old Mohandas Gandhi. He is buried in Brookwood Cemetery in Surrey.

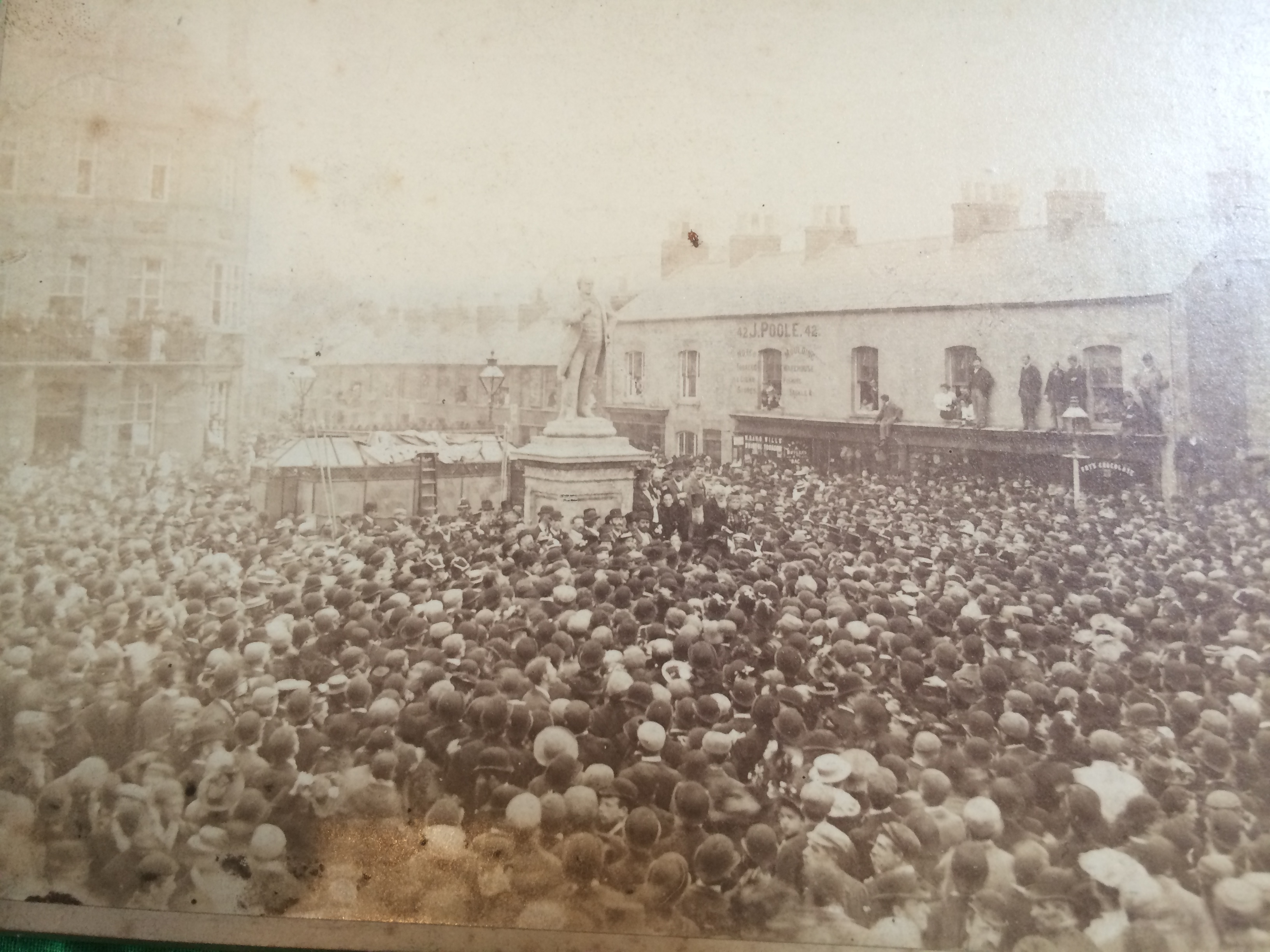
Photo of the Charles Bradlaugh Statue in Abington Square, Northampton, with a large crowd

In 1898, Bradlaugh's daughter Hypatia Bradlaugh Bonner wrote a pamphlet in answer to the question that was often addressed to her: whether her father "changed his opinions and became a Christian" before he died. Bonner laid out all the evidence and concluded that her father gave no indication that his opinions had changed in the "smallest" way.

== Commemoration ==
A statue of Bradlaugh is located on a traffic island at Abington Square, Northampton. The statue points west towards the centre of Northampton, the accusing finger periodically missing due to vandalism. In 2014 the statue was cleaned and returned to the stonework. New signs are to be installed in 2015 on the roundabout reading "Charles Bradlaugh MP".

Since 2002, an "Annual Commemoration" has taken place beneath the statue at 3 pm on the Sunday closest to his birthday, organised by the Charles Bradlaugh Society. Attendees are invited to speak about Charles Bradlaugh. 2014 saw the addition of the inaugural Bradlaugh Talk with speakers on issues relevant to Bradlaugh. The first speaker was Graham Smith, CEO of Republic.

Bradlaugh Fields, a community wildlife park situated to the north of Northampton, was named after Charles Bradlaugh when it opened in 1998. Other landmarks bearing his name include The Charles Bradlaugh pub, Charles Bradlaugh Hall at the University of Northampton, and Bradlaugh Hall in Lahore, Pakistan.

In November 2016 a portrait bust of Charles Bradlaugh was added to the Parliamentary Art Collection. Displayed in the Palace of Westminster, the sculpture was designed by Suzie Zamit (who is the fourth female sculptor to have work represented in the Parliamentary Art Collection) and was donated by the National Secular Society as part of its 150th anniversary celebrations.

== Works by Charles Bradlaugh ==
- Political Essays: A Compilation (1833–1891)
- Half-Hours with the Freethinkers 1857
- The Credibility and Morality of the Four Gospels, 1860
- "Who Was Jesus Christ, and What Did He Teach?" 1860
- A Few Words About the Devil (includes an autobiographical sketch) 1864
- "A Plea for Atheism" (included in Theological Essays) 1864
- The Bible: What It Is! 1870
- The Impeachment of the House of Brunswick 1875
- The Freethinker's Text-Book, Vol. 1 1876
- Is The Bible Divine? (Debate with Roberts) 1876
- Ancient and Modern Celebrated Freethinkers (rpt Half-Hours with the Freethinkers) 1877
- Why do men starve?, London: Austin & Co., 1870s, Wikidata Q26395493
- Poverty: its effects on the political condition of the people, London: Austin & Co., 1870s, Wikidata Q26720834
- When Were Our Gospels Written? 1881
- Perpetual Pensions [1881], International Library of Science & Freethought, Freethought Publishing Company, 28, Stonecutter Street, London E.C.
- Some Objections to Socialism 1884
- The Atheistic Platform: 12 Lectures by Charles Bradlaugh, Annie Besant [and others] 1884
- Is There a God? 1887
- Humanity's Gain from Unbelief 1889
- Labour and Law 1891
- The True Story of My Parliamentary Struggle 1882
- Heresy: Its Utility And Morality. A Plea And A Justification 1882
- Theological Essays (includes 20 essays) 1895
- Man, Whence and How? and Religion, What and Why? (rpt of The Freethinker's Text-Book, Vol 1) 1906

== See also ==
- Luis Emilio Recabarren, Chilean communist, was prevented from assuming his position because, as an atheist, he refused to be sworn in on a Bible.
- Bradlaugh Riots, a violent disturbance that took place in Northampton, England, on the night of 6 October 1874, following the defeat of Charles Bradlaugh at the 1874 Northampton by-election.

== Bibliography ==
- Alexander, Nathan G. (2019). Race in a Godless World: Atheism, Race, and Civilization, 1850-1914. New York/Manchester: New York University Press/Manchester University Press. ISBN 978-1526142375
- Alexander, Nathan G. "Atheism and Polygenesis in the Nineteenth Century: Charles Bradlaugh's Racial Anthropology." Modern Intellectual History. (2018)
- Arnstein, Walter L (1962). "Gladstone and the Bradlaugh Case". Victorian Studies. 5 (4): 303–330.
- Arnstein, Walter L. (1965) The Bradlaugh Case: a study in late Victorian opinion and politics. Oxford University Press. (2nd ed. with new postscript chapter published as The Bradlaugh Case: Atheism, Sex and Politics Among the Late Victorians, University of Missouri Press, 1983. ISBN 0-8262-0425-2)
- Besant, Annie. Autobiographical Sketches (1885) in which Bradlaugh plays a major role.
- Besant, Annie. An Autobiography (1893) in which Chap VI is devoted to Charles Bradlaugh.
- Bonner, Hypatia Bradlaugh (1891), Catalogue of the Library of the Late Charles Bradlaugh. London: Mrs. H. Bradlaugh Bonner
- Bonner, Hypatia Bradlaugh (1894). Charles Bradlaugh: A Record of His Life and Work, Vol I. London, T. Fisher Unwin.
- Bonner, Hypatia Bradlaugh (1894). Charles Bradlaugh: A Record of His Life and Work, With an Account of his Parliamentary Struggle, Politics and Teachings, by John M. Robertson, Vol II. London, T. Fisher Unwin.
- Champion of Liberty: Charles Bradlaugh (Centenary Volume) (1933). London, Watts & Co and Pioneer Press.
- Diamond, M. (2003) Victorian Sensation, London, Anthem Press. ISBN 1-84331-150-X, pp. 101–110.
- Headingly, Adolphe S. (1888). The biography of Charles Bradlaugh. London: Freethought Publishing Company.
- Manvell, Roger (1976). Trial of Annie Besant and Charles Bradlaugh. London: Elek/Pemberton.
- Niblett, Bryan (2011). Dare to Stand Alone: The Story of Charles Bradlaugh. Oxford: kramedart press. ISBN 978-0-9564743-0-8
- Robertson, J.M. (1920). Charles Bradlaugh. London, Watts & Co.
- Tribe, David (1971) President Charles Bradlaugh MP. London, Elek. ISBN 0-236-17726-5

Parliament of the United Kingdom
Preceded by Pickering Phipps; Charles Merewether	Member of Parliament for Northampton; 1880 – 1891; With: Henry Labouchère	Succeeded by Henry Labouchère; Moses Manfield
