= List of atheists (surnames R to S) =

Atheists with surnames starting R and S, sortable by the field for which they are mainly known and nationality.

Name	Dates	Known as / for	Who	Reference
Ivica Račan	1944–2007	Politician	Croatian leftist politician who led the Social Democratic Party of Croatia between 1989 up to 2007.	see source
James Rachels	1941–2003	Philosopher	American philosopher who specialized in ethics.	Rachels argued for the nonexistence of God based on the impossibility of a being worthy of worship.
Daniel Radcliffe	1989–	Actor	British (English) actor, most famous for his lead role in the Harry Potter series.	"I'm an atheist, but I'm very relaxed about it. I don't preach my atheism, but I have a huge amount of respect for people like Richard Dawkins who do. Anything he does on television, I will watch."
Alfred Radcliffe-Brown	1881–1955	Social scientist	British (English) social anthropologist who developed the theory of Structural functionalism.	"An atheist from at least his student years, he became an honorary associate of the Rationalist Press Association in 1952. An Oxford student remembered him as 'somewhat assertive in his arguments against religion' (C. Fuller, 'An interview with M. N. Srinivas', Anthropology Today, 15/5, 1999, 5), but the nearest he came to showing it in print was the suggestion that religion is a source of 'fears and anxieties from which [men] would otherwise be free—the fear of black magic or of spirits, fear of God, of the Devil, of Hell' (Radcliffe-Brown, Structure, 149). [...] His restraint may have sprung from an austere conception of science or from the functionalist fear that destroying a people's beliefs will undermine their social system."
Justin Raimondo	1951–2019	Blogger	American author and the editorial director of Antiwar.com	"Although I was raised a Catholic, I am not a believer."
Craig Raine	1944–	Author	British (English) poet and critic, the best-known exponent of Martian poetry.	Reviewing Raine's collection In Defence of T. S. Eliot, Charles Osborne and Sally Cousins wrote: "Raine, a fine poet, is also an entertaining and thought-provoking critic, and his subjects range widely from the Bible, which as an atheist he appreciates for its short stories, "some of the greatest ever written", to Bruce Chatwin, whom he sensibly does not take too seriously."
Frank Ramsey	1903–1930	Scientist	British (English) mathematician who also made significant contributions in philosophy and economics.	"His tolerance and good humour enabled him to disagree strongly without giving or taking offence, for example with his brother Michael Ramsey whose ordination (he went on to become archbishop of Canterbury) Ramsey, as a militant atheist, naturally regretted."
Ayn Rand	1905–1982	Author and philosopher	Russian-born American author and founder of Objectivism	"I am an intransigent atheist, but not a militant one."
James Randi	1928–2020	Skeptical investigator	American magician, debunker, and founder of the James Randi Educational Foundation.	"...I am a concerned, forthright, declared, atheist."
A. Philip Randolph	1889–1979	Activist	African-American leader during the civil rights movement.	"Although greatly influenced by his father's political and racial attitudes, Randolph resisted pressure to enter the ministry and later became an atheist."
Gwen Raverat	1885–1957	Artist	British (English) wood engraving artist who co-founded the Society of Wood Engravers in England.	"In spite of Gwen's lifelong atheism, during her funeral "there was something appropriate about the choice of Psalm 23 ('He shall feed me in green pastures: and lead me forth beside the waters of comfort')".
Derek Raymond	1931–1994	Author	British (English) writer, credited with being the founder of English noir.	[Derek Raymond was the pen name of Robert Cook] "Cook was an atheist, but he described his probes into abjection and despair with almost religious intensity."
Claire Rayner	1931–2010	Journalist	British (English) journalist best known for her role for many years as an agony aunt.	"I tell you something, in case anyone wonders, not a single out-of-body experience, no long corridors of light, I was an atheist when it started and I've remained one. People used to say to me, 'You wait until something really bad happens, you'll start praying', but I didn't and I can't. I don't put this down to any superior being, I put it down to the superb training and skill of the people looking after me. I remain the humanist I always was."
Jay Rayner	1966–	Journalist	British (English) journalist, writer and broadcaster.	"For however devout an atheist I may be (and, by God, I am), and however little time I have for the rituals of the tribe of which I am a part, there is still something about the taste of a fine piece of salt beef which speaks to a fundamental part of me."
Ron Reagan	1958–	Activist and journalist	American magazine journalist, board member of the politically activistic Creative Coalition, son of former U. S. President Ronald Reagan.	"I'm an atheist so... I can't be elected to anything, because polls all say that people won't elect an atheist.
Carl Reiner	1922–2020	Actor	American actor, film director, producer, writer and comedian, winner of nine Emmy Awards	"I'm not a believer, I call myself an atheist. It was man who invented God. I once wrote that there are 15 things I know about God, and one is that he is allergic to shellfish. There are far too many commandments and you really only need one: Do not hurt anybody."
Lady Michele Renouf	1946–	Activist and Holocaust denier	Campaigns on behalf of far right Holocaust deniers, including David Irving and Richard Williamson. She has produced a DVD about questioning the Holocaust, Jailing Opinions, and has been working on another DVD, Pious Piracy, questioning the existence of Jesus.	"An Australia-born socialite who became a believer in Holocaust denial and a major supporter of disgraced historian David Irving, Michele Renouf, an avowed atheist, nevertheless abhors Judaism. In a 2003 interview she said, "People act as though Judaism is just another religion like Christianity or Islam. It's not. It's a creed of domination and racial superiority."
Jean-François Revel	1904–2006	Philosopher	French politician, journalist, author, prolific philosopher and member of the Académie française.	"Despite asserting that he had always loathed the family, both the one he was born into and the ones he had created, in the same year he published Le Moine et le philosophe (1997, "The Monk and the Philosopher", 1998), a book-length dialogue between Revel, the convinced atheist, and his son Mathieu Ricard, who had abandoned a career in molecular biology research to go to live in Asia, to study Buddhism, and who subsequently became a Buddhist monk."
Griff Rhys Jones	1953–	Comedian	British (Welsh) comedian, writer, actor and television presenter.	"I read the whole of the Chronicles of Narnia when I was little and I grew up an atheist. My problem, I realise, was that I just didn't believe in Aslan."
Stan Rice	1942–2006	Author	American poet and artist, Professor of English and Creative Writing at San Francisco State University, and husband of writer Anne Rice.	Reviewing Anne Rice's Christ the Lord: Out of Egypt, Matt Thorne noted: "In a long author's note, Rice explains how she experienced an old-fashioned, strict Roman Catholic childhood in the 1940s and 1950s, before leaving the Church at 18 due to sexual pressure and her desire to read authors she considered forbidden to her, such as Kierkegaard, Sartre, and Camus. Two years later she married a passionate atheist, the poet and artist Stan Rice, and in 1974, began a literary career that she now retrospectively views as representing her 'quest for meaning in a world without God'."
Randolf Richardson	1973–	Activist	President of the Canadian atheists.	"Randolf Richardson is the founding President of the Canadian atheists; born and raised in Canada, he has always been an atheist, and has a passion for the freedoms born of our history that defined key constitutionally-fortified principles of Canadian culture that emphatically protect fairness, justice, and equality for everyone. ..."
Gerhard Richter	1932–	Artist	German artist, considered one of the most important German artists of the post-World War II period.	"Neither artist is a believer. A German critic, Hubertus Butin, has termed Richter "a professed atheist with a strong leaning toward Catholicism"-a characterization that the artist condoned with a sly smile, when I saw him in Cologne."
Marc Riley	–	Musician	British musician, alternative rock critic and radio DJ.	"The Bible made me an atheist." Marc Riley in response to the question "A book that changed me..."
Nikolai Rimsky-Korsakov	1844–1908	Musician	Russian Nationalist composer, member of "The Five", best known for the symphonic suite Scheherazade.	The Guardian describes as "a devout atheist - Stravinsky later described him rather disapprovingly as having a mind 'closed to any religious or metaphysical idea'"
Joseph Ritson	1752–1803	English antiquary	English writer and antiquary.	"Superstition is the mother of Ignorance and Barbarity. Priests began by persuading people of the existence of certain invisible beings, which they pretended to be the creators of the world, and the dispensers of good and evil; and of whose wills, in fine, they were the sole interpreters."
Diego Rivera	1886–1957	Painter	World-famous Mexican painter, muralist, and husband of Frida Kahlo.	"Rivera was of Jewish Converso heritage and Catholic upbringing, but a professed atheist and communist for most, if not all, of his life."
Richard J. Roberts	1943–	Scientist	British (English) biochemist and molecular biologist. He won the Nobel Prize in Physiology or Medicine in 1993 for the discovery of introns in eukaryotic DNA and the mechanism of gene-splicing.	"The Nobel Laureate Dr Richard Roberts will give a public lecture entitled A Bright Journey from Science to Atheism..."
Bryan Robertson	1925–2002	Art curator	British (English) curator and arts manager, "the greatest Director the Tate Gallery never had".	"We read mythology and had periods for religious knowledge with separate classes for Jews and Catholics as there would be now for Muslims. Myths, after all, are the vaudeville of religion; how can you become a convincing atheist without prior knowledge of what you're rejecting?"
Fyfe Robertson	1902–1987	Journalist	British (Scottish) television journalist.	"An atheist, despite his upbringing, he described himself as a humanist radical."
J. M. Robertson	1856–1933	Atheist activist	British (Scottish) journalist, advocate of rationalism and secularism, social reformer and Liberal Member of Parliament.	"In that year he came under the influence of the radical freethinker Charles Bradlaugh and, after being active in the Edinburgh Secular Society, accepted Bradlaugh's invitation to join him in London as assistant editor of the National Reformer. When Bradlaugh died, Robertson became editor until the publication failed in 1893, when he founded the Free Review, which he edited until 1895. [...] During the late 1880s and the 1890s Robertson extended his interests beyond atheism, free thought, and neo-Malthusianism and became increasingly involved with radical and ethical causes [...]."
Christopher Robin Milne	1920–1996	Inspirational figure	British son of author A. A. Milne who, as a young child, was the basis of the character Christopher Robin in his father's Winnie-the-Pooh stories and in two books of poems	"The books live on. But in real life Toad is dead; Alice is dead; Peter Pan and Wendy are long flown; and now Christopher Robin, a 'sweet and decent' man who overcame a childhood in which he was haunted by Pooh and taunted by peers, has left without saying his prayers - he was a dedicated atheist - aged 75."
Dove-Myer Robinson	1901–1989	Politician	New Zealand politician, Mayor of Auckland from 1959–1965 and 1968–1980.	"Preferring his second name, he began calling himself Dove-Myer. He also rejected Judaism, becoming a lifelong atheist."
Richard Rodgers	1902–1979	Musician	American composer of the music for more than 900 songs and 40 Broadway musicals, best known for his songwriting partnerships with the lyricists Lorenz Hart and Oscar Hammerstein II.	Rodgers' biographer William G Hyland states: "That Richard Rodgers would recall, at the very beginning of his memoirs, his great-grandmother's death and its religious significance for his family suggests his need to justify his own religious alienation. Richard became an atheist, and as a parent he resisted religious instruction for his children. According to his wife, Dorothy, he felt that religion was based on "fear" and contributed to "feelings of guilt."
Henry Rollins	1961–	Musician and activist	American singer-songwriter, spoken word artist, stand-up comedian, author, actor, activist and publisher. Associated acts: Black Flag, Rollins Band.	“I don't have any spiritual beliefs. There is no god in my world.”, "I guess necessity has shaped my “non-belief”. I respect someone’s religion and any reason that brought them to it but it’s never been something I felt I needed in my life."
Gilbert Romme	1750–1795	Politician	French politician and mathematician who developed the French Republican Calendar.	"Although an atheist, Romme did not support deChristianization, nor did he regret the fall of Maximilien Robespierre."
Ned Rorem	1923–2022	Musician	American composer	"I'm an atheist"
Steven Rose	1938–	Scientist	British (English) Professor of Biology and Neurobiology at the Open University and University of London, and author of several popular science books	"Have you ever broken one of the ten commandments? As an atheist from an early age, I can't readily remember them. But I expect I have."
Michael Rosen	1946–	Author	British (English) children's novelist, poet and broadcaster, Children's Laureate 2007–2009.	"Monica asked my parents if they minded if I said grace (my family are Jewish), they said not at all. Apparently, though, I wouldn't close my eyes, put my hands together or say the prayer but would only shout 'No thank you, God!' I am an atheist now."
Proinsias De Rossa	1940–	Politician	Irish politician, former President of the Workers' Party, leader of Democratic Left, and later a senior member of the Labour Party.	"Two weeks ago, the minister for social affairs, Proinsias de Rossa, announced the setting up of a commission on the family. He was described to me as "the social conscience of the present government, that tends to be a little Thatcherite." He is a socialist and an avowed atheist, remarkable for an Irish politician."
Martin Rowson	1959–	Artist	British (English) political cartoonist, novelist and satirist.	Rowson refers to himself as an atheist throughout his 2008 book The Dog Allusion: Gods, Pets and How to be Human (The title is a play on that of Richard Dawkins's The God Delusion.)
Manabendra Nath Roy	1887–1954	Politician	Indian (Bengali) revolutionary, internationally known political theorist and activist, founder of the Communist parties in Mexico and India. He later denounced communism, as exponent of the philosophy of radical humanism	"But Roy was an atheist and fierce priest hater..."
Dave Rubin	1976–	Talk show host	American political commentator, comedian, talk show host, and television personality	
Michael Ruse	1940–	Philosopher	British (English) philosopher of science, known for his work on the argument between creationism and evolutionary biology.	"Philosopher Michael Ruse has written: ' The God Delusion makes me embarrassed to be an atheist.' But in all the hype and embarrassment over geneticist Professor Richard Dawkins's anti-religious arguments, there is an important strand in his argument that has been overlooked: his views on morality."
Bertrand Russell	1872–1970	Philosopher	British (Welsh) philosopher and mathematician. He won the Nobel Prize in Literature in 1950. Though he considered himself an agnostic in a purely philosophical context, he said that the label atheist conveyed a more accurate understanding of his views in a popular context.	"As a philosopher, if I were speaking to a purely philosophic audience I should say that I ought to describe myself as an Agnostic, because I do not think that there is a conclusive argument by which one prove that there is not a God. On the other hand, if I am to convey the right impression to the ordinary man in the street I think I ought to say that I am an Atheist... None of us would seriously consider the possibility that all the gods of Homer really exist, and yet if you were to set to work to give a logical demonstration that Zeus, Hera, Poseidon, and the rest of them did not exist you would find it an awful job. You could not get such proof. Therefore, in regard to the Olympic gods, speaking to a purely philosophical audience, I would say that I am an Agnostic. But speaking popularly, I think that all of us would say in regard to those gods that we were Atheists. In regard to the Christian God, I should, I think, take exactly the same line."
Oliver Sacks	1933–2015	Scientist	American-based British neurologist, who has written popular books about his patients, the most famous of which is Awakenings.	"All of which makes the [Jewish] Wingate Prize a matter of bemusement. "Yes, tell me," he says, frowning. "What is it, and why are they giving it to an old Jewish atheist who has unkind things to say about Zionism?" "
Marquis de Sade	1740–1814	Writer	French aristocrat, revolutionary, and writer of philosophic, violent pornography espousing extreme freedom (licentiousness), who was morally, religiously, and legally untrammelled in pursuing personal pleasure as the highest principle.	"Marquis de Sade was renowned as a libertarian atheist who took the foundations of the Enlightenment, such as equality, pleasure and freedom of self-thought, to its limit to create his own, seemingly wayward, taxonomy."
Henry Salt	1851–1939	Activist	British (English) writer and campaigner for social reform in the fields of prisons, schools, economic institutions and the treatment of animals, a noted anti-vivisectionist and pacifist, and a literary critic, biographer, classical scholar and naturalist, and the man who introduced Mahatma Gandhi to the influential works of Henry David Thoreau.	"I approached Henry Salt's Life with caution, knowing him to be a "compendium of cranks" (he was an atheist, vegetarian, ex-Eton master, ethical socialist, prison reformer, correspondent of Gandhi, and married a lesbian perhaps without realising it)."
Eric Sams	1926–2004	Musician	British (English) musicologist and Shakespeare scholar.	"To these he brought the disciplines that had stood him in such good stead in music, most particularly the rejection of traditional beliefs unsupported by hard evidence. This also lay behind his own atheism."
Graeme Samuel	–	Businessperson	Australian businessman, formerly the chairman of the Australian Competition & Consumer Commission.	"Well in my own mind I'm absolutely certain. I'm not agnostic, I'm an atheist, but that's a view that's been formed over I guess, 45 years of thinking and of analysing and just - and I have no embarrassment about it, no shame about it, nor any pride. It's my way of life, my way of thinking. I'm an atheist. And I have to say to you that although there are still many who strongly adhere to religions of one form or another, I find many others that when you actually out yourself as an atheist, say, 'Yes, well so am I'."
Terry Sanderson	1946–2022	Atheist activist	British secularist and gay rights activist, author and journalist, President of the National Secular Society since 2006.	"Many members of the NSS are, of course, also atheists. Some, including myself, have come to the conclusion that belief in the supernatural is fallacious, and they don't hesitate to say so. The fact that adherents to the supernatural explanation of life apparently cannot bear to hear any opposition, and rush to label atheists as "fundamentalist", is a measure of where we are."
Margaret Sanger	1879–1966	Activist	American birth-control activist, founder of the American Birth Control League, a forerunner to Planned Parenthood. The masthead motto of her newsletter, The Woman Rebel, read: "No Gods, No Masters".	see source. The following quote most succinctly displays proof of her avowed atheism: '"While I personally believe in the sterilization of the feeble-minded, the insane and syphilitic, I have not been able to discover that these measures are more than superficial deterrents when applied to the constantly growing stream of the unfit. They are excellent means of meeting a certain phase of the situation, but I believe in regard to these, as in regard to other eugenic means, that they do not go to the bottom of the matter." ("Birth Control and Racial Betterment," Feb. 1919, The Birth Control Review).'
George Santayana	1863–1952	Philosopher	Spanish philosopher in the naturalist and pragmatist traditions who called himself a "Catholic atheist."	"Santayana playfully called himself 'a Catholic atheist,' but in spite of the fact that he deliberately immersed himself in the stream of Catholic religious life, he never took the sacraments. He neither literally regarded himself as a Catholic nor did Catholics regard him as a Catholic.""My atheism, like that of Spinoza, is true piety towards the universe, and denies only gods fashioned by men in their own image, to be servants of their human interests."
Robert Sapolsky	1957–	Scientist	American Professor of Biological Sciences and Professor of Neurology and Neurological Sciences at Stanford University.	Dan Barker: "When we invited Robert Sapolsky to speak at one of out national conventions to receive our 'Emperor Has No Clothes Award', Robert wrote to me, 'Sure! Get the local Holiday Inn to put up a sign that says Welcome, Hell-bound Atheists!' [...] So, welcome you hell-bound atheist to Freethought Radio, Robert." Sapolsky: "Well, delighted to be among my kindred souls." [...] Annie Laurie Gaylor: So how long have you been a kindred non-soul, what made you an atheist Robert?" Sapolsky: "Oh, I was about fourteen or so... I was brought up very very religiously, orthodox Jewish background and major-league rituals and that sort of thing [...] and something happened when I was fourteen, and no doubt what it was really about was my gonads or who knows what, but over the course of a couple of weeks there was some sort of introspective whatever, where I suddenly decided this was all gibberish. And, among other things, also deciding there's no free will, but not in a remotely religious context, and deciding all of this was nonsense, and within a two week period all of that belief stuff simply evaporated."
José Saramago	1922–2010	Author	Portuguese writer, playwright and journalist. He was awarded the Nobel Prize in Literature in 1998.	CNN reports that: "Among these works are mythical stories through which Saramago, a communist and atheist, weaves his own brand of social and political commentary."
Jean-Paul Sartre	1905–1980	Philosopher	French existentialist philosopher, dramatist and novelist who declared that he had been an atheist from age twelve.	"He was so thoroughly an atheist that he rarely mentioned it, considering the topic of God to be beneath discussion. In his autobiography, The Words, Sartre recalled deciding at about age twelve that God does not exist, and hardly thinking about it thereafter." "Although he regarded God as a self-contradictory concept, he still thought of it as an ideal toward which people strive." He rejected the Nobel Prize for Literature in 1964. According to Sartre, his most-repeated summary of his existentialist philosophy, "Existence precedes essence," implies that humans must abandon traditional notions of having been designed by a divine creator.
Adam Savage	1967–	Television presenter	American television co-host on the program MythBusters.	"I'm actually the fourth generation in my family to have no practical use for the church, or God, or religion. My children continue this trend."
Dan Savage	1964–	Author	American author and sex advice columnist.	"If Osama bin Laden were in charge, he would slit my throat; my God, I'm an atheist, a hedonist, and a faggot." Skipping Towards Gomorrah: The Seven Deadly Sins and the Pursuit of Happiness in America Savage declared in his syndicated sex advice column: "I'm Catholic—in a cultural sense, not an eat-the-wafer, say-the-rosary, burn-down-the-women's-health-center sense. I attended Quigley Preparatory Seminary North, a Catholic high school in Chicago for boys thinking of becoming priests. I got to meet the Pope in 1979..."
Vinayak Damodar Savarkar	1883–1966	Atheist activist	Indian revolutionary freedom fighter, and Hindu nationalist leader.	Savarkar was an atheist. When he was the Hindu Mahasabha president he used to give lectures on why there is no god.
Phil Sawford	1950–	Politician	British (English) politician and former Member of Parliament for Kettering.	"I, too, am a republican atheist, by the way—that should be put in the record—and agree with points made by other hon. Members."
Michael Schmidt-Salomon	1967–	Philosopher	German philosopher, author and former editor of MIZ (Contemporary Materials and Information: Political magazine for atheists and the irreligious) [MIZ title in German: Materialien und Informationen zur Zeit (MIZ) (Untertitel: Politisches Magazin für Konfessionslose und AtheistInnen)]	"Like many other so-called "Atheists" I am also not a pure atheist, but actually an agnostic..."
Arthur Schopenhauer	1788–1860	Philosopher	German philosopher and author of the book The World as Will and Representation.	"Within Schopenhauer's vision of the world as Will, there is no God to be comprehended, and the world is conceived of as being meaningless."
Rosika Schwimmer	1877–1948	Activist	Hungarian-born pacifist, feminist and female suffragist.	"Schlotfeldt sent her another letter on Jan. 11, 1927, in which he specifically asked her about a statement she had made to Col. Lee Alexander Stone in September 1925, in which she wrote: "I am an uncompromising pacifist for whom even Jane Addams is not enough of a pacifist. I am an absolute atheist. I have no sense of nationalism, only a cosmic consciousness of belonging to the human family." (Both Schwimmer and Rabe knew Addams, the noted co-founder of Chicago's famed Hull House and the first woman to receive a Nobel Peace Prize.) Schwimmer responded to "my dear Mr. Schlotfeldt" in a Jan. 21, 1927, letter that she was "quoted correctly" in her response to Stone. "
John Searle	1932–	Philosopher	American philosopher, Slusser Professor of Philosophy at the University of California, Berkeley, widely noted for contributions to the philosophy of language, the philosophy of mind, and to social philosophy.	Reviewing an episode of the Channel 4 series Voices: "On the one hand, Sir John Eccles, a quiet-spoken theist with the most devastating way of answering questions with a single "yes", on the other, Professor Searle, a flamboyant atheist using words I've never heard of or likely to again "now we know that renal secretions synthesize a substance called angiotensin and that angiotensin gets into the hypothalamus and causes a series of neuron firings."
Brian Sedgemore	1937–2015	Politician	British (English) Labour Party politician.	"Moreover, unless I am much mistaken, as that person is a Church Commissioner he must be a member of the Church of England, an organisation of which I was a member before I became an atheist."
Amartya Kumar Sen	1933–	Scientist	Indian winner of the 1998 Nobel Laureate in Economics.	see sources
Andy Serkis	1964–	Actor	British (English) actor and director, best known for his portrayal of Sméagol/Gollum in The Lord of the Rings.	"Serkis has been an atheist since his teens but feels spiritual when he's up a mountain (he once climbed the Matterhorn solo) and is much drawn to the karmic possibilities of energy transference. 'Not in a woo-ey way,' he smiles, 'but the idea that your energy lives on after you I find very relieving.'" Catherine Shoard, "Beastie Boy: You can take Andy Serkis out of the animal gear, but you can't take the animal out of Andy Serkis,"
Claude Shannon	1916–2001	Scientist	American electrical engineer and mathematician, has been called "the father of information theory", and was the founder of practical digital circuit design theory.	"Shannon described himself as an atheist and was outwardly apolitical."
Aziz Shavershian	1989–2011	Bodybuilder	Australian bodybuilder, internet celebrity, personal trainer, model and a part-time stripper who maintained a cult following.	"What religion are you?" - "was catholic, now atheist."
George Bernard Shaw	1856–1953	Irish playwright	Irish playwright.	"All the sweetness of religion is conveyed to the world by the hands of storytellers and image-makers. Without their fictions the truths of religion would for the multitude be neither intelligible nor even apprehensible; and the prophets would prophesy and the teachers teach in vain."
Percy Bysshe Shelley	1792–1822	Author	British Romantic poet, contemporary and associate of John Keats and Lord Byron, and author of The Necessity of Atheism.	Listing of Shelley's The Necessity of Atheism at Amazon.com
Ariane Sherine	1980–	Author	British comedy writer, journalist and creator of the Atheist Bus Campaign.	"I'm a believer - in plastering buses with atheist slogans."
Michael Shermer	1954–	Author	American science writer and editor of Skeptic magazine. Has stated that he is an atheist, but prefers to be called a skeptic.	"I am an atheist. There, I said it. Are you happy, all you atheists out there who have remonstrated with me for adopting the agnostic moniker? If "atheist" means someone who does not believe in God, then an atheist is what I am. But I detest all such labels. Call me what you like — humanist, secular humanist, agnostic, nonbeliever, nontheist, freethinker, heretic, or even bright. I prefer skeptic."
Hanna Sheehy-Skeffington	1877–1946	Politician	Irish suffragist and nationalist.	"She had been a militant nationalist among the pacifist internationalist feminists, a republican among the free staters, a feminist among the nationalists, and an atheist in holy Ireland."
Owen Sheehy-Skeffington	1909–1970	Politician	Irish university lecturer and Senator.	"His parents combined Irish nationalism, atheism, feminism, pacifism, and socialism. Sheehy-Skeffington learned to think for himself, coming to share their politics, minus his mother's later abstentionist republicanism."
Clare Short	1946–	Politician	British politician, former Labour Secretary of State for International Development, now an Independent MP.	"Father Doonagh might have described this helping hand to a needy stranger as an act of Christian charity. That's probably not how the atheist Short would see it."
Dmitri Shostakovich	1906–1975	Musician	Soviet composer, one of the greatest and most popular of the 20th century.	see source
Don Siegel	1912–1991	Actor	American film director and producer.	"His first chance came in 1944, when after a long period of feuding with Warner, Warner offered him a short. Siegel himself is a Jewish-born atheist. "I wondered what I could do which would most annoy Warner as a Jew; and decided on a present-day retelling of the story of the nativity. To my surprise he liked the idea, and it was a big success. So then I wondered what else I could do which would irritate him and tried something quite different, which was Hitler Lives."
Herbert A. Simon	1916–2001	Social scientist	American political scientist and economist, one of the most influential social scientists of the 20th century.	"The "ardent debater" championed unpopular causes, "but from conviction rather than cussedness", in high-school discussions: the single tax, free trade, unilateral disarmament, strengthening the League of Nations. Indeed, his first publication, whilst still in grade school, was a letter to the Editor of the Milwaukee Journal, defending atheism."
Joe Simpson	1972–	Sportsperson	British (English) mountaineer, author and motivational speaker, famous for his book Touching the Void, subsequently filmed.	Q: "You say you are an atheist - did your experience affect your belief or just confirm it?" Simpson: "Confirmed it very powerfully. I saved my own life: it wasn't some omniscient being."
Clive Sinclair	1940–2021	Businessperson	British (English) entrepreneur and inventor of the world's first 'slim-line' electronic pocket calculator and early personal computers.	"Oh God no," says Sir Clive Sinclair. "I was once asked [to be a godparent] and I said I can't, I'm an atheist. Actually I think I did have a couple, once, but I can't say I looked after them. Sort of lost them, or forgot about them."
Maurice Sinet	1928–2016	Artist	French radical left-wing cartoonist.	"The editor of the weekly, Philippe Val, 55, asked Siné to retract. The cartoonist — who was an anticolonial critic of the Algerian war, supports a Palestinian state, is a fierce atheist and spends a good part of the day on a respirator — said he would rather castrate himself."
Jill Singer	c.1957–2017	Journalist	Australian journalist, columnist and television presenter.	"I love Christmas. Some might think I have no right to because I am an atheist. But for countless millions of non-believers across the world, today is still a very special day. [...] Like Dawkins, I am an atheist who is deeply concerned about the rapidly escalating intolerance of free thought and speech that is being fuelled by religious fundamentalism, whether we are talking about Australia, the US, Iraq, Indonesia or Saudi Arabia."
Peter Singer	1946–	Philosopher	Australian utilitarian philosopher, proponent of animal rights, and Ira W. DeCamp Professor of Bioethics at Princeton University.	"I am an atheist."
Bhagat Singh	1907–1931	Activist and politician	Indian revolutionary freedom fighter.	"I had become a pronounced atheist."
Dennis Skinner	1932–	Politician	British (English) politician, who has been the Labour Member of Parliament for Bolsover since 1970.	"All MPs may reserve a particular seat in Parliament for morning prayers, which they then keep for the rest of the day. Skinner, an atheist, refuses to pray, but still likes to 'bagsy' his favourite pew. Following a complaint from the Tory Chris Grayling, the Serjeant at Arms issued him with a formal reprimand. 'Dennis told him to get stuffed,' says a colleague. 'It's an excellent spot for heckling, and he's not going to vacate it without a fight.'"
Joe Slovo	1926–1995	Politician	South African Communist politician, leader of the South African Communist Party and leading member of the African National Congress.	"Although Joe grew up in a religious household, he became an atheist while retaining respect for "the positive aspects of Jewish culture".
Arthur Smith	1954–	Comedian	British (English) alternative comedian and writer.	"Digger: What makes you laugh and what makes you sad? Arthur: Laugh... Woody Allen. Sad ... The patent mortality that lurks at the edge of one's vision. Digger: The fact that we know we're going to die? Arthur: Yes, I speak as a rationalist and an agnostic/atheist - the essential tragedy of the end of life."
Bob Smith	1969–	Artist	American graphic artist, who prompted controversy with his creation of Jesus Dress Up.	Smith explains his atheism and answers questions about his position on his website.
Brendan Powell Smith	–	Artist	American artist, author, and creator of The Brick Testament, which illustrates stories from the Bible by dioramas of LEGO bricks.	"I've been fascinated with religion ever since I became an atheist at about the age of 13. Prior to that I had been a regular churchgoer and my mother was even a Sunday School teacher at our local Episcopal church. But as my childhood was approaching its end, I had this idea (I'm not sure from where) that it would be a good idea to "prepare for adulthood" by consciously trying rid myself of what seemed like childish ways of thinking. I recognized superstitions for what they were, and tried to turn away from "magical thinking". I didn't intend for any of this to affect my religious beliefs, but in the end it did in a profound way, and soon enough I found myself the only atheist I knew amongst my family, friends, and community."
Charles Lee Smith	1887–1964	Atheist activist	American atheist activist and an editor of the Truth Seeker until his death. He also founded the American Association for the Advancement of Atheism. Smith was arrested twice in 1928 for selling atheist literature and for blasphemy. Since he refused to swear an oath to God on the Bible, he was not allowed to testify in his own defense.	"Closer to home, in Arkansas, atheist activist Charles Lee Smith was twice arrested in 1928, first for selling atheist literature and then for blasphemy. Moreover, since he couldn't as an atheist swear an oath to God on the Bible, he wasn't permitted to testify in his own defense!"
George H. Smith	1949–2022	Philosopher	Japanese libertarian philosopher, author and educator. Smith authored Atheism: The Case Against God.	"This book is a presentation and defense of atheism."
Joan Smith	1953–	Author	British (English) novelist, journalist and human rights activist.	"Like most atheists, I don't mind in the least being insulted for my beliefs, as long as I am not prevented from expressing them."
Ian Smith	1938–	Actor	Australian soap opera character actor and television screenwriter, best known today for his long-running role as Harold Bishop in Neighbours.	" Ian himself is the longest-serving member of the cast, and fans are often shocked when they meet him, expecting him to be an old fuddy duddy like his famous alter ego. "I can't argue with any of his morals on life," Ian says. "He believes in honesty, in not doing anybody any harm, and doing an honest day's work for an honest day's pay. "As far as those things go, I pretty much base him on my own values, but I swear, I drink booze and I'm an atheist, so I am different to Harold." "
Linda Smith	1958–2006	Comedian	British (English) comedian and comedy writer, president of the British Humanist Association from 2004 until her death.	"But it was secondary school, Bexleyheath Comprehensive, that really put me off God. I suddenly thought in assembly that this was all rubbish, all these stupid old gits like the headmaster and the deputy headmaster reading out this piffle and all these sulky kids moving their mouths to these hymns. I do remember enquiring whether or not you could be removed from assembly on the grounds of being an atheist, but I was told that it didn't count. You could only be excluded if you were Jewish, Catholic or Muslim. But not believing in God was not a valid reason.""An atheist from childhood, Linda Smith was appointed president of the British Humanist Society in 2004, declaring her intention to wake up a society which she felt had become stuck in the past."
Michael Smith	1932–2000	Scientist	British-born Canadian biochemist and Nobel Laureate in Chemistry in 1993.	see source
Quentin Smith	1952–2020	Philosopher	American philosopher and professor of philosophy at Western Michigan University. Smith co-authored the book Theism, Atheism and Big Bang Cosmology with William Lane Craig.	Smith has written papers arguing for the nonexistence of God.
Robert Smith	1972–	Sportsperson	American football player and analyst.	"Former Minnesota Vikings running back Robert Smith, an atheist, says he has no objection to making religious counseling and services available to interested players."
Robert Smith	1959–	Musician	British Musician vocalist guitarist songwriter multi-intramentalist, He is the lead singer and principal songwriter of the rock band The Cure.	Robert Smith himself stated in a press conference in 1992: "I don't believe in god. I wish I did." A quote from a 1989 issue of The Face magazine [1] that further clarifies Smith's religious position: "....I used to lay myself open to visions of God, but I never had any. I come from a religious family, and there have been moments when I've felt the oneness of things, but they never last, they fade away, leaving me with the belief that it's only fear that drives people to religion. And I don't think I'm ever going to wake up and know that I was wrong." " Robert Smith interviewed by Ray Cokes for Interview Music Plant 2Nite 2001 stated to Question: Which religion, if any, makes the most sense to you? "..I think if the world, as a whole, could outlaw religion for one year, people would be really amazed at how happy the place could be. I think that religion is the worst invention of man, in the history of men." at the 0:51 mark
Warren Allen Smith	1921–2017	Author	American writer, activist and humanist.	Author of Who's Who in Hell.
Barbara Smoker	1923–2020	Atheist activist	British humanist activist and freethought advocate. Wrote the book Freethoughts: Atheism, Secularism, Humanism – Selected Egotistically from The Freethinker.	see source
Steven Soderbergh	1963–	Filmmaker	American filmmaker, Academy Award-winning director of such films as Traffic, Erin Brockovich, Ocean's Eleven, Sex, Lies, and Videotape and Che (film).	"I’m a hardcore atheist."
Todd Solondz	1959–	Film director	American screenwriter and independent film director known for his style of dark, thought-provoking satire.	In response to the question "Is there a God?", Solondz said "Well, me, I'm an atheist, so I don't really believe there is. But I suppose I could be proven wrong."
Marie Souvestre	1830–1905	Activist	French headmistress, a feminist educator who sought to develop independent minds in young women.	"To learn at Les Ruches came Anna (Bamie) Roosevelt, the favourite sister and later adviser of Theodore Roosevelt [...] and Richard Potter—though Beatrice Potter (later Webb), then antipathetic to the Frenchwoman's energetic atheism, declined to follow her sister Rosy. [...] In London, Souvestre became intimate, as well as with the Harrisons and Stracheys, with Leslie Stephen, the Morleys, the Chamberlains, Mrs J. R. Green, and a wider circle of radicals and freethinkers, including the young Beatrice Webb. A convinced humanist, candidly pro-Boer, anti-imperialist, and anti-clerical—though she also frequented and liked the Mandell Creightons—she impressed with her intellect and charmed with her personality."
Richard Spencer	1978–	White supremacist	American, president of the National Policy Institute, and said to have created the term "alt-right"	"I’m an atheist."
Robert Spitzer	–	Social scientist	American psychiatrist, Professor of Psychiatry at Columbia University, a major architect of the modern classification of mental disorders.	"Dr Spitzer has said repeatedly that as an "atheist Jew" his only interest in the issue is scientific truth, adding that an orthodoxy which forbids acknowledgement of the possibility of change is as flawed as that which labels homosexuality an act of will and morally wrong."
Hedi Stadlen	1916–2004	Politician	Austrian Jewish political activist, philosopher and musicologist.	"Both parents were Jewish, although not observant. Towards the end of the First World War, when there was starvation in Vienna, Hedi's father sent mother and daughter to the countryside; in some villages, farmers and shopkeepers expressed their intense anti-Semitism by refusing to sell food unless the buyer could produce a Christian baptismal certificate. Hans Simon arranged for both mother and daughter to be baptised. Later on, when Hedi was 14, she was able to dispense with a religious identity altogether, choosing to become "konfessionslos" ("without religion"), in accordance with the provisions of the Austrian constitution. It was, for her, a relief: she was already a convinced atheist."
Joseph Stalin	1878–1953	Leader	Soviet ruler from 1922-1953.	Became an atheist after entering a Georgian Orthodox seminary at the age of 16
Richard Stallman	1953–	Activism	American software freedom activist, hacker, and software developer.	see source
Pete Stark	1931–2020	Politician	American (U.S.) Representative (D-CA), the first openly atheist member of Congress.	Stark called himself "a Unitarian who does not believe in a supreme being" and has been identified as an atheist.
David Starkey	1945–	Historian	British (English) historian, television and radio presenter, and specialist in the Tudor period.	"Like a lot of atheists, Starkey can seem a little obsessed with religion. [...] 'Personally, I find the inclusiveness and uncertainty of the Church of England as horrible as the brittle, iron-edged certainties of Islam and I would much rather the chairman of the National Secular Society held up the Coronation sword. But I can't see that happening. Although I am an atheist, unlike a Richard Dawkins, I understand the importance of religious motive and, broadly, I am sympathetic to it - except when it is fused with the political, which is what Henry does, and which modern Islam wants to do, and also what Tony Blair and George Bush flirt with.' "
Wayne Static	1965–2014	Musician	American frontman for Industrial Metal band Static-X	quoted saying that he is an atheist in an interview with concertlivewire.com
David Ramsay Steele	–	Author	Author of From Marx to Mises: Post-Capitalist Society and the Challenge of Economic Calculation (an exposition of the economic calculation problem) and Editorial Director of Open Court Publishing Company.	"Reviewing Steele's book, Victor J Stenger called it "A clear, concise, complete, and convincing presentation of the case for atheism."
Britney Spears	1981–	Musician and songwriter	American singer and dancer; teen pop idol	"Like I said, God would not have let this happened to me. I don't believe in god [sic] anymore because of the way my children and my family have treated me. There is nothing to believe in anymore. I'm an atheist y'all."
George Warrington Steevens	1869–1900	Author	British journalist and writer.	"By early 1890 Steevens had broken with his family's Brethrenism, and he described himself as 'a discontented atheist' (Steevens to Browning; Oscar Browning MSS)."
Victor J. Stenger	1935–2014	Scientist	American physicist, emeritus professor of Physics and Astronomy at the University of Hawaii and adjunct professor of Philosophy at the University of Colorado.	Author of the book God: The Failed Hypothesis.
Bruce Sterling	1954–	Author	American science fiction author, best known for his novels and his seminal work on the Mirrorshades anthology, which helped define the cyberpunk genre.	In response to the question "What do you think about Umberto Ecco's words that "libraries are the houses of God", and since you are doing that Dead Media project - I kinda connected you two in my head?", Sterling said "I don't believe in God. I read Umberto Eco, though."
Juliet Stevenson	1956–	Actress	British (English) actress.	"The actress Juliet Stevenson was on the ITV1 Sunday programme last week, reading the poems of Philip Larkin. She revealed that she, like him, was an atheist."
Robert Louis Stevenson	1850–1894	Author	British (Scottish) novelist, poet and travel writer, especially famous for his works Treasure Island and The Strange Case of Dr Jekyll and Mr Hyde.	"A decadent dandy who envied the manly Victorian achievements of his family, a professed atheist haunted by religious terrors, a generous and loving man who fell out with many of his friends - the Robert Louis Stevenson of Claire Harman's biography is all of these and, of course, a bed-ridden invalid who wrote some of the finest adventure stories in the language. [...] Worse still, he affected a Bohemian style, haunted the seedier parts of the Old Town, read Charles Darwin and Herbert Spencer, and declared himself an atheist. This caused a painful rift with his father, who damned him as a "careless infidel".
Max Stirner	1806–1856	Philosopher	German-born anarchist philosopher and author	Author of The Ego and Its Own
Matt Stone	1971–	Writer/voice actor	Co-creator of South Park	On the March 25, 2011 Nightline, he stated, "I am an atheist, I live my life like I'm an atheist."
J. Michael Straczynski	1954–	Writer	American writer and producer, creator of Babylon 5.	When asked what book he would choose to memorize, Straczynski said "Despite being an atheist, I would probably choose the Book of Job."
Christer Sturmark	1964–	Businessperson	Swedish IT entrepreneur and chairman of The Swedish Humanist Organisation.	Translation: I am also an atheist. I find that just about everybody are atheists. The religions of the world has created many gods. Hinduism has millions. Most of the people I meet that call themselves Christians are atheists when it comes to all gods, except for one.
Jack Suchet	1908–2001	Scientist	South African born obstetrician, gynaecologist and venereologist, who carried out research on the use of penicillin in the treatment of venereal disease with Sir Alexander Fleming.	"Suchet's father Jack, an atheist and eminent surgeon, emigrated from South Africa to England in the 1930s and never spoke about his family's past."
Eleazar Sukenik	1889–1953	Scientist	Israeli archaeologist and professor of Hebrew University in Jerusalem, undertaking excavations in Jerusalem, and recognising the importance of the Dead Sea Scrolls to Israel.	"I read a few sentences. It was written in beautiful Biblical Hebrew. The language was like that of the Psalms.' One of these was the Isaiah scroll, which I saw recently in the Rockefeller Museum in East Jerusalem: sections of goat-skin parchment, sewn together, 27 feet long. I felt in the presence of something numinous, although I have been a convinced atheist since boyhood. But this document is a testament to the inexplicable persistence of the human mind, in the face of all the evidence, in believing that we are on earth for a divine purpose."
Harkishan Singh Surjeet	1916–2008	Politician	Indian politician, General Secretary of the Communist Party of India (Marxist) from 1992 to 2005 and a member of the party's Polit Bureau from 1964 to 2008.	"Surjeet, who always sported a white turban, was also passionately opposed to the Sikh separatist campaign that bled Punjab for a decade until 1993. An atheist, he led a spartan lifestyle and always wore simple, even crumpled clothes."
Veton Surroi	1961–	Politician	Kosovo Albanian publicist and politician.	"Veton liked good food, good wine, Faulkner, opera, La Traviata, Tchaikovsky, Celtic music, jazz, blues, you name it," she said. "But he cared more about his people. He was an atheist but most Muslims still respected him," she [his wife] said, before correcting her use of the past tense. "I mean he is an atheist. His favourite novel was Faulkner's As I Lay Dying but I believe he is alive. You have to believe that."
Leonard Susskind	1940–	Scientist	American theoretical physicist; a founding father of superstring theory and professor of theoretical physics at Stanford University.	In a review of Susskind's book The Cosmic Landscape: String Theory and the Illusion of Intelligent Design, Michael Duff writes that Susskind is "a card-carrying atheist."
David Suzuki	1936–	Activist	Canadian university professor, science broadcaster, and environmental activist.	"As an atheist, Suzuki declares, he has no illusions about life and death, adding that the individual is insignificant in cosmic terms."
Julia Sweeney	1959–	Comedian	American actor and comedian. Alumna of Saturday Night Live, author/performer of a one-woman autobiographical stage show about finding atheism: Letting Go of God.	see source
Matthew Syed	1970–	Sportsperson	British (English) table tennis international, three times the Men's Singles Champion at the Commonwealth Table Tennis Championships and competing for Great Britain in two Olympic Games, now a Times journalist.	"Those of a religious persuasion will doubtless be screaming at their newspapers by now, proclaiming that the true route towards happiness (and away from damaging, as opposed to useful, negative emotions) is not to be found in the writings of Darwin, Oliver James, Easterlin or any other mortal. And they may be on to something. Even atheists such as myself read the New Testament with a sense of amazement at the wisdom embedded in the teachings of Christ. "It is better to give than to receive," he said, something that must have sounded like a wind-up to his long-suffering disciples."
