= Barry Duke =

South African journalist (born 1947)

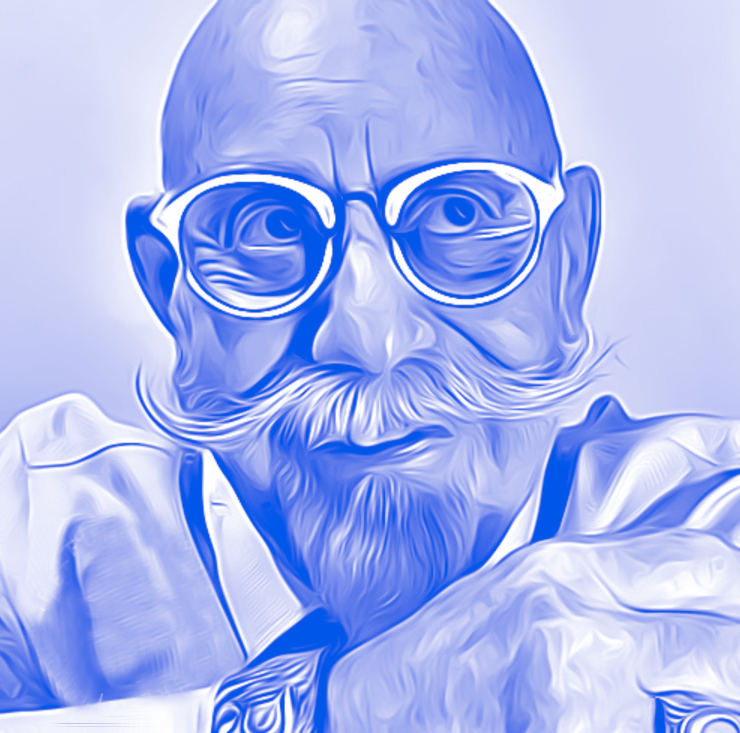
- Born: February 1, 1947 (age 79); Johannesburg, South Africa
- Occupations: Journalist, activist, editor

Barry Duke (born 1 February 1947 in Johannesburg) is a journalist, atheist, gay rights activist, former editor of The Freethinker and current editor of The Pink Humanist and The Angry Atheist.

== Life and career ==
Born in apartheid South Africa, Duke began writing as a trainee journalist in his teens for The Springs Advertiser in 1964. After completing a course in photojournalism in 1967, he moved to The Star (South Africa) newspaper in Johannesburg working as an investigative journalist and The Star's chief magistrates' court reporter. In 1973, Duke moved to the UK, where he continued to write anti-apartheid pieces for Argus Newspapers (now Independent News and Media). In 1974 Duke joined publishing company Broadstrood Press whilst beginning to write regularly for The Freethinker. Leaving publishing in 1980, Duke began working as a public relations executive for British Transport Hotels. When the company was privatized, Duke left in 1983 to work for Citigate Publishing and pursue freelance work. In 1996, Duke left Citigate to look after a terminally ill partner, but continued to write freelance. In 1997, Duke took over as the interim editor of The Freethinker, following the death of previous editor Peter Brearey. After six months, Duke was confirmed as the editor. Duke was sacked at the beginning of January 2022. In 2011, he took on the additional role of editor of The Pink Humanist, published by the Pink Triangle Trust. In 2023, Duke launched "The Angry Atheist" blog.

== Activism ==
Duke was involved in the Anti-Apartheid Movement and on arriving in the UK as a refugee from South Africa continued supporting the African National Congress.

Duke strongly opposed the Nationwide Festival of Light, and worked alongside The Freethinker and National Secular Society to try to counter its effects and influence. In 1979, Duke was a founding member of the Gay Humanist Group, (now Gay and Lesbian Humanist Association) after Mary Whitehouse began a private prosecution for blasphemous libel against Gay News (see Whitehouse v Lemon.) After the founding of the Gay Humanist Group, Duke was very active in the promotion of gay and atheist rights and was also briefly the treasurer of the National Secular Society (NSS).

In 2010, he relocated to Spain and, in 2017, was awarded a Lifetime Achievement Award by the NSS. In the same year, he was married to his partner of 20 years, Marcus Oliver Robinson, in Gibraltar. He once wrote a weekly column for Euro Weekly News, an English paper published in Spain.

In 2025 Duke published his biography, Well, Goodness, Godless Me - A Romp Through the Life (So Far) of a Rebellious Gay Atheist.
