= David Reynolds (author) =

David Alan Clifton Reynolds (born October 1948) is an English author and publisher.

== Biography ==
Reynolds was born in London and worked as a sub-editor at Oz magazine, editorial assistant on the Rationalist Press Association's Humanist journal, and editor of The Freethinker, before graduation from the London School of Economics. He went on to work in publishing, working as a sub-editor, in effect a writer, at Reader's Digest. He joined the recently founded Dorling Kindersley in 1975 as an editor, working on John Seymour's Complete Book of Self-Sufficiency and John Hedgecoe's Photographer's Handbook among others. In 1979 he co-founded Shuckburgh Reynolds, a book packaging company producing illustrated international co-editions. He became a co-founder of Bloomsbury Publishing in 1986, having worked on a business plan with co-founder Nigel Newton since 1984. At Bloomsbury he was Publishing Director for Non-Fiction; his authors included Hunter S. Thompson, Patti Smith, Joanna Lumley, Brian Sewell, Jonathan Coe, Richard Williams, Ranulph Fiennes, Prue Leith, Monty Don and Fred Zinnemann. In 1999 he left Bloomsbury to pursue a career as a writer. In 2006 he was a co-founder of Old Street Publishing, of which he is a director. In 2005 he qualified as a teacher of literacy to adults and was employed part-time as a teacher by South Thames College, an FE college in Wandsworth. In 2006 he was involved in the launch of Quick Reads, a series of books intended for emerging adult readers, and became its literacy editor, a role he fulfilled until 2024. For four years, beginning in 2014, he was First Story Writer in Residence at King Solomon Academy in Paddington.

== Freethinker Editor ==
Reynolds served as editor of the secularist/atheist publication The Freethinker from September 1968 to July 1970, the youngest person to have done so.

According to The Freethinker's historian, Jim Herrick:

He persuaded new writers to contribute, and introduced photographs, interviews and a regular cartoon by Daly. He continued Tribe's determination to keep the Freethinker squarely in touch with the crises of the modern world. A typically wide-ranging front-page was headed "A Holy Mess" and began: "Egypt and Israel, India and Pakistan, Federal Nigeria and the breakaway 'Biafra', are the prime examples at the present time of strife stemming from deep-seated religious differences" and went on to discuss the situation in Northern Ireland. (19 October 1968)

== Publishing ==
Reynolds was Deputy Managing Director and Publishing Director (non-fiction) for Bloomsbury Publishing, co-founding the company with Chief Executive Nigel Newton, Liz Calder and Alan Wherry. Reynolds departed in 1999.

== Writing ==
Reynolds's first book, Swan River (2001), was shortlisted for the PEN/Ackerley Prize for Autobiography. His second and third books were Slow Road to Brownsville (2014) and Slow Road to San Francisco (2020). His fourth book is a work of crime fiction, The Lady in the Park (2025).

== Personal life ==
Reynolds is married and has three daughters and six grandchildren. He lives in London.

== Bibliography ==
- Swan River: a memoir of a family mystery (Picador, 2001)
- Slow Road to Brownsville: A Journey through the Heart of the Old West (Greystone Books, 2014)
- Slow Road to San Francisco: Across the USA from Ocean to Ocean (Muswell Press, 20 Aug. 2020)
- The Lady in the Park (Muswell Press, 5 June, 2025)
