= Ethel Venton =

British politician and animal welfare activist

- Born: 1891; East End of London
- Died: February 1988 (aged 96–97)
- Occupations: Labour Party councillor and animal welfare activist
- Known for: Secularism

Ethel Venton (1891 – February 1988) was an English secularist, Labour Party councillor and animal welfare activist. She was the first female president of the National Secular Society, from 1971–1972, having previously served as a vice-president.

== Biography ==
Ethel Johnstone was born in the East End of London, and married Laurence (Laurie) Venton (died 1957) in 1915.

=== Labour party activism ===
During the 1930s, Venton served as a Labour Party councillor in West Ham and was a member of committees concerned with hospitals and child welfare.

=== Secularist activism ===
Venton joined the National Secular Society and was a friend of Chapman Cohen, serving as a vice-president of the Society for some years. When, in 1971, long-serving president David Tribe unexpectedly decided not to stand again, Venton was elected his successor. She was the only candidate and served as president for only one year before being replaced by Barbara Smoker in 1972.

According to her obituary in The Freethinker,

Becoming NSS president in her late seventies, she had a hard act to follow by succeeding David Tribe, the Society's most effective post-war president... Mrs Venton had difficulty in adjusting to new methods of campaigning. However, she realised times were changing and accepted that the NSS had to alter its style and image. Although unable to cope with modern public relations techniques, she recognised that ability in others and gave credit where it was due. Ethel Venton followed the example of her immediate predecessor by always putting the Society's interests first and leaving it in a sound condition.

=== Animal welfare activism ===
Venton was a vegetarian, and a committed opponent of animal cruelty. She was secretary of the National Council for Animal Welfare, organising the annual "Animal Fair" at the old Royal Horticultural Hall (Lindley Hall, London) in that capacity for many years before a fall at the age of 86 led to declining health and the decision to merge the NCAW into the Royal Society for the Prevention of Cruelty to Animals.

=== Final years and death ===
According to her obituary in The Freethinker, March 1988:

Despite failing health and infirmity, Mrs Venton remained independent and lived alone until a few months before her death. Last September, in the early hours of the morning, she had a serious fall and was not found for several hours. After that she never left hospital.

There was a secular committal ceremony at Southend-on-Sea Crematorium.
