= Kit Mouat =

English poet, author and humanist activist

Kit Mouat (1 March 1920 – 3 September 1986) was an English poet, author and secular humanist activist and editor. She worked and wrote under the pseudonym "Kit Mouat" to protect her diplomat husband. She also used the names Jane MacKay and Jean MacKay, and Catharine Lund.

== Life and family ==
Mouat was born Joan Mabel Sandison in Croydon, Surrey, England, in March 1920. Her father was Dr Alexander Sandison OBE (1885-1972, awarded OBE in 1934), and her mother was Esther Catherine Gold (1880-1937). Their marriage was announced in The Times.

Mouat's older brother, also called Alexander (1914-1990) became a scientific librarian, and in retirement led a campaign against the Abbey National Building Society's plans to become a public company. Alexander collapsed and died after addressing the annual meeting of Abbey National on 10 April 1990.

Mouat's mother had a mastectomy when Mouat was 13 years old, and died three years later. Her father remarried in 1938.

During the Second World War, Mouat served in the Women's Royal Naval Service. She married Ian Peter MacKay MBE (awarded in 1945 following war service in Italy) on 4 September 1948. MacKay had been born in Gosforth, Northumberland, on 31 May 1919, and survived Mouat to die on 2 February 1995. Leaving the military in 1946, he joined the Central Office of Information the following year, and the Foreign Office in 1948.

From 1949-1953, the couple were posted to Stockholm . According to the Diplomatic Service List, 1979 After a year back in the Foreign Office, MacKay was made Second Secretary in Copenhagen, 1955, after which he was posted to Berlin in 1957 and The Hague in 1959. From 1962 he was First Secretary to the Foreign Office.

== Poetry ==
Mouat's poetry was published in a variety of publications, including Tribune, Women's Voice, Free Press, Humanist in Canada, The Humanist, Progressive World, The Norseman, Croydon Advertiser, Breakthru international poetry magazine, and The Freethinker. She published three collections of poetry: Time Smoulders, and other poems (1971), Poems of an Angry Dove (1975), and I'm Staying (1985). Her work appeared in the anthology, Eve Before The Holocaust: an anthology of women's poems and stories on the nuclear threat (D. Sealy/Blackrose, 1984).

== Humanist activism ==
Mouat was the first secretary of the Agnostics Adoption Bureau, which was later renamed the Independent Adoption Society, and founded the Humanist Letter Network.

Mouat edited the secularist journal The Freethinker August 1966 – January 1967. According to The Freethinker's historian, Jim Herrick:

She introduced personal articles from readers describing "How I Became a Humanist" and invited much discussion of the role of humanism.

== Cancer activism ==
Mouat herself was diagnosed with primary breast cancer in 1969. In 1986, she wrote:

After another 12 years however, 'inoperable (terminal) secondary cancers' were found in my lymph glands, lung etc. I was given a few months to live; a maximum of 2 years. That was nearly 4 years ago.

In 1982, Mouat founded a mutual-aid network of three support groups for cancer patients called Cancer Contact. She described its work, and her views on the state of cancer research and medicine, in her contribution to a three-part series on cancer in the feminist magazine Spare Rib. Her 1984 book, Fighting for our Lives: an introduction to living with cancer, was based on the work of Cancer Contact.

== Death ==
Mouat died in St Catherine's Hospice, Crawley, on 3 September 1986. She was 66.

According to The Freethinker,

The Rev Eric Hayden, rector of Cuckfield, conducted a secular service which included readings from Voltaire and D'Holbach, at the Surrey and Sussex Crematorium, Worth. Kit Mouat's husband said: "Although she was an atheist, she dearly wished to have the funeral conducted by the village rector". Mr Hayden, a personal friend, said he did not need permission of the Anglican authorities to conduct the secular service.

== Bibliography ==
- What Humanism is About (Barrie and Rockliff, 1963. Translated into German as Leben In Dieser Welt, 1964)
- "Theological Striptease", in Oz, issue 1, February 1967, pp.13, 17. Online
- The Problem of Loneliness (National Secular Society, 1967)
- Time Smoulders and other poems (The Mitre Press, 1971)
- Poems of an Angry Dove (The Mitre Press, 1975)
- An Introduction to Secular Humanism (Gay Humanist Group, 1980)
- Fighting for our Lives: an introduction to living with cancer (with a preface by Sheila Hancock (Heretic Books, 1984)
- I'm Staying: more poems by Tribune Poet Kit Mouat (Woodwick Press, 1985). ISBN 0-9510319-0-2.
