= William McIlroy (secularist) =

British secularist and atheist activist, writer and editor (1928–2013)

William J. "Bill" McIlroy (4 July 1928 – 22 August 2013) was a British secularist and atheist activist, writer and editor.

McIlroy was for many years editor of The Freethinker (three stints: 1970–71, 1975–December 1976, September 1981–December 1992) and general secretary of the National Secular Society (two stints: 1963–1970, 1972–1977). In 2005, he received a lifetime achievement award from the NSS for 50 years of service to the secularist movement.

== Personal life ==
Born in Northern Ireland, he later lived in Coventry, London and Sheffield. His wife Margaret, with whom he had two daughters, predeceased him, dying from multiple sclerosis. William McIlroy lived independently in Brighton for the last 15 years of his life before being diagnosed with cancer in 2012.

== Freethinker editor ==
McIlroy served as editor of The Freethinker for 14 years in total. He first served as editor during 1970–1971, having stepped down as general secretary of the National Secular Society. In Jim Herrick's history of The Freethinker, "Vision and Realism" (1982), Herrick commented on McIlroy's "journalistic flair and sense of humour":

Within a few months, he was running stories like the one headed "Nun-running Scandal Hits the Vatican", about a nun-running racket from the poverty-stricken Indian state of Kerala to meet a shortage of Catholic nuns. His exposure of the indoctrination tactics of sects and cults was ahead of its time. As a former General Secretary of the National Secular Society he was in a good position to use the Freethinker as a campaigning arm and he did much to gain media publicity for secularist activities.

== Campaigning activities ==
As National Secular Society General Secretary from 1963 to 1970, McIlroy worked alongside David Tribe, the Australian-born president of the society 1963–1971. Tribe's memoir of the period, published by the NSS, notes McIlroy's activities in support of liberalising Sunday:

Entertainment, sport, commerce, trade and industry were specifically banned (with exceptions to enable the faithful to attend church). In the early 1960s the potential organisers of such activities were strangely silent until the NSS, notably through William McIlroy's battles with the Lord's Day Observance Society, galvanised them into supportive action.

McIlroy was secretary of the Committee Against Blasphemy Law, which was founded in August 1977 to protest the trial of the editor and publishers of Gay News. In 1989, McIlroy, along with Nicolas Walter, reformed The Committee Against Blasphemy Law to protest the threat to Salman Rushdie over Rushdie's The Satanic Verses. The committee issued a new Statement Against Blasphemy Law, signed by more than 200 public figures.

McIlroy was the keynote speaker at the inaugural meeting of the Gay Humanist Group, which became the Gay and Lesbian Humanist Association.

== Interviews ==
- Fine, Zac (2007). Praise Be for Secularism. Rocks Magazine.

== Publications ==
- McIlroy, William (1970). Educational reform: Story of a Campaign. London: National Secular Society. OCLC 39400306.
- ——————— (1995). Foundations of Modern Humanism (PDF). Sheffield: Sheffield Humanist Society. ISBN 978-0-9525644-0-9. OCLC 32922506. Archived from the original (PDF) on March 3, 2016.
- ——————— (2007). Without the Faith: Freethinkers and Freethought in Brighton and Hove. Brighton: Brighton and Hove Humanist Society. ISBN 978-0-9555257-0-4. OCLC 144595527.
