= Keith Porteous Wood =

British secularist

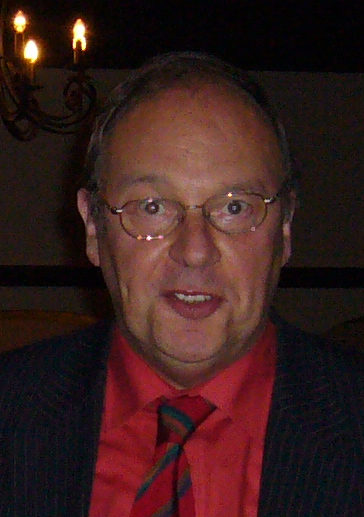
- Born: November 1947 (age 77)
- Occupation: President of the National Secular Society
- Partner: Terry Sanderson

Keith Porteous Wood (born November 1947) is the president of the National Secular Society in the United Kingdom. From 1996 until November 2017 he held the paid position of general secretary which was later re-titled executive director.

In 2007, he received the Distinguished Service to Humanism Award from the International Humanist and Ethical Union for his work in building up the National Secular Society and campaigning for secularism both nationally and internationally.

== Biography ==
Before his appointment as National Secular Society general secretary in 1996, Wood had been director of finance for companies in the wholesale and retail food distribution, financial services and insurance sectors.

On his retirement in 2017, he stepped down from his position as the executive director and was elected president, replacing his life partner Terry Sanderson, who was president for eleven years before stepping down and being elected a vice president. They had been together for over two decades before the recognition of same-sex relationships by the state, and they entered into a civil partnership in 2006 although Sanderson hinted they were about to marry in his 2015 autobiography. They remained together until Sanderson's death in 2022.

== Secularist and humanist activities ==
In 1996, Wood was appointed general secretary of the National Secular Society, following the retirement of Terry Mullins (who had held the post since 1979). Describing him as a "radical campaigner in a business suit", Peter Brearey, then editor of The Freethinker, welcomed Wood's appointment, noting his campaigning track record and background of "25 years in senior managerial and professional roles covering administration, accounting, legal and company secretarial issues."

In 2013, following criticisms from Lord Carey, that David Cameron was "feeding anxieties" about Christian persecution and "that the government seemed to be "aiding and abetting" aggressive secularisation," Wood declared that Carey had "no right to insist that his discriminatory and intolerant views should prevail over those of the public and Parliament".

As an international representative of the International Humanist and Ethical Union, he has criticised the activities of the Holy See within the United Nations system and accused the Vatican of not fulfilling its political obligations under the UN Convention on the Rights of the Child. Wood is strongly critical of the Vatican and the Roman Catholic Church over Catholic sex abuse cases, worldwide and corruption in the Vatican. He stated, "Child abuse is a major issue, along with corruption, that he [Pope Francis] needs to sort out. His legacy will be judged, I think, on his ability to deal with these immensely difficult problems."

== See also ==
- Atheism
- Secularism
- Freethought

== Bibliography ==
- Brearey, Peter (1996). "Radical campaigner in a business suit." The Freethinker, Vol. 116 (6), June, p. 7.

== Writings by Keith Porteous Wood ==
- Secularism at the end of the 20th century (1997). Leicester: Leicester Secular Society.
