= Cobell =

Cobell is a surname. Notable people with the surname include:

- Denis Cobell (born 1938), British secularist, humanist, republican and pacifist
- Elouise P. Cobell (1945–2011), American tribal elder and activist, banker and rancher
