= Venton =

Venton may refer to:

- Ethel Venton (1891–1988), English secularist
- Harley Venton (born 1953), American actor
- Richie Venton (born 1953), Scottish trade unionist
- Venton, Maryland, an unincorporated community in the United States
- Venton hamlet, a hamlet within the civil parish of Drewsteignton, Devon, UK
