= George Standring =

George Standring (1855–1924) was a British radical politician.

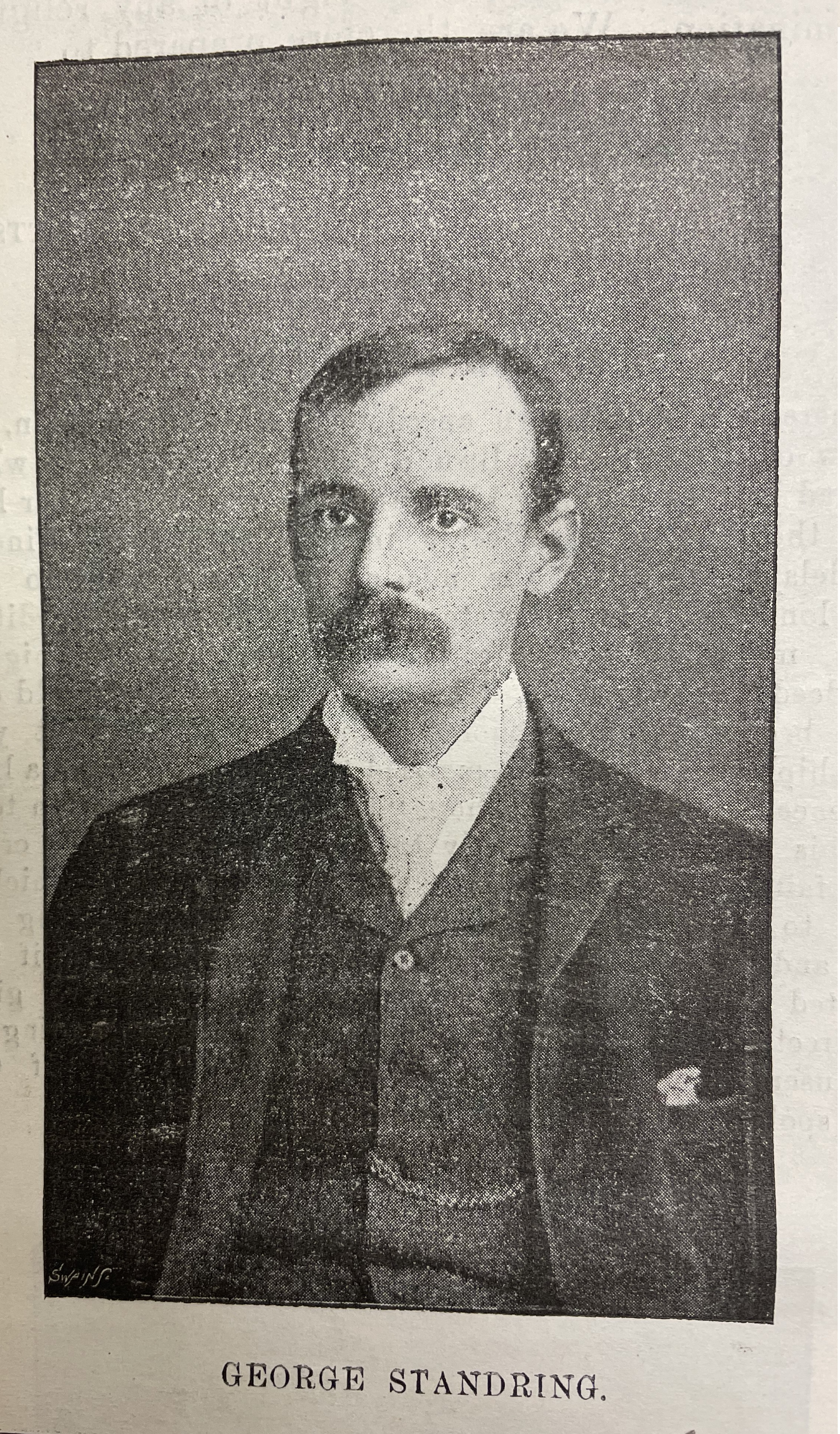
Reproduction of photograph of George Standring (published in the Freethinker, 1893)

Born in 1855, Standring was brought up as a Wesleyan Methodist, but became an atheist when he was seventeen, and joined the National Secular Society (NSS), becoming its secretary in 1875. That year, he also launched the Republican Chronicle newspaper, and served as its editor as it became the Republican and the Radical, finally leaving the paper in 1889. He used the paper's printing press to publish work for numerous other radical groups, including the Fabian Society from its formation.

Standring was personally opposed to socialism for many years, but in 1894 changed his mind, leaving the NSS, and joining the Fabian Society. He was almost immediately elected to its executive, serving until 1908, and again from 1909 to 1910. He founded and served as secretary of the Freethought Federation, as a rival to the NSS.

In 1903, Standring was elected to Finsbury Borough Council. He was also secretary of the Socialist Supper Club.

Non-profit organization positions
Preceded by Charles Watts	Secretary of the National Secular Society; 1876–1877	Succeeded by Robert Forder
