= Peter Brearey =

British secularist, socialist, and journalist

Peter Leslie Brearey (23 December 1939 – 7 May 1998) was a British secularist, socialist, and journalist, and editor of The Freethinker from 1993 to 1998.

He was born in Dewsbury. Although his family background was Church of England, Brearey rejected religion as a teenager. He was a member of the Young Communist League and subsequently the Communist Party of Great Britain. He remained a Marxist for the rest of his life, but had moved away from the CPGB towards the Socialist Party of Great Britain.

He started his own newspaper, the Dewsbury Sentinel, at the age of sixteen, and went on to work for many local newspapers and contribute to hundreds of publications. He was news editor of the Wakefield Express, editor of the Ossett Observer, and founding editor of Healthview, newspaper of Yorkshire Regional Health Authority. He also wrote an opinion column for the Pontefract and Castleford Express, one edition of which (from 1985) was cited by Granville Williams in a discussion of the decline of local newspaper journalism:

In stark contrast to the politicised headlines and stories in most of the national press attacking the miners, the P&C went in for straight reporting. The paper did have an opinion column though, written by Peter Brearey, with the headline "A Time For Calm After The Storm" which argued it was a time for reconciliation, to get the pits working again and make the Five Towns a centre for investment.

An activist in the National Union of Journalists, his book for young journalists, "Never Say Scoop", was published in 1981.

He was editor of The Freethinker (this had been a childhood ambition) from 1993 until his death from cancer at the age of 58. According to the Dictionary of Atheism, Skepticism & Humanism, Brearey "brought color and life to the journal". In New Humanist, Jim Herrick wrote that "his acceptance of the Freethinker editorship could be seen as the culmination of his career. His editorship was innovative yet faithful to the past." Keith Porteous Wood, then General Secretary of the National Secular Society (of which Brearey was a vice-president), noted that Brearey "kept the magazine as much as possible away from involvement in arguments in the movement, saddened by the energy they dissipated."

A couple of months before his death he and his wife had moved to Orkney. He was buried in the garden of his house on Sanday to the singing of The Red Flag.

== Works ==
- Never Say Scoop (1981) Cleckheaton: Kirklees Monographs
