= Chapman Cohen =

English atheist, secularist writer, and lecturer (1868–1954)

- Born: 1 September 1868; Leicester, England
- Died: 4 February 1954 (aged 85); Brentwood, Essex, England
- Other names: CC
- Occupations: Freethinker and secularist writer and lecturer
- Children: 2
- Parent(s): Enoch Cohen and Deborah Barnett

Chapman Cohen (1 September 1868 – 4 February 1954) was an English freethinker, atheist, and secularist writer and lecturer.

== Life ==
Chapman Cohen (known by his contemporaries as CC) was the elder son of Enoch Cohen, a confectioner, and his wife, Deborah (née Barnett). He was born in Leicester, although the family moved to London in 1889. He attended a local elementary school but was otherwise self-educated. He had read Spinoza, Locke, Hume, Berkeley, and Plato by the time he was eighteen. He was a bibliophile and avidly collected books all his life.

Cohen recalled that he had "little religion at home and none at school", as he was withdrawn from Religious Instruction classes. He described his own attitude to religion as being characterised by "easy-going contempt".

Cohen and his wife, Celia, had two children; a son, Raymond, who entered the medical profession, and a daughter, Daisy, who died at the age of 29 from tuberculosis.

== Secularist activism ==
Cohen moved to London in 1889, and soon became involved in the secularist movement. Cohen commented that,

My introduction to the platform of the National Secular Society was quite accidental. I had heard none of its speakers, read none of its publications, except an occasional glance at Bradlaugh's National Reformer. I knew there was a Freethought movement afoot, but that was about all.

Cohen (1940, p. 61) relates that in the Summer of 1889 he was walking in Victoria Park when he came across a crowd listening to a Christian speaker:

the speaker was opposed by an old gentleman – at least he seemed old to me – who suffered from an impediment in his speech. The lecturer in replying spent part of his time in mimicking the old gentleman's speech. After he had "replied," the lecturer asked for more opposition. Mainly because of his treatment of the old man I accepted the invitation.

He spoke against the same lecturer – at their invitation – a few weeks later. Shortly afterwards he was invited to speak by the local branch of the National Secular Society (NSS). After a year of lecturing for the freethought cause, he joined the NSS. He was elected a vice-president of the NSS in 1895.

In 1897 Cohen began contributing weekly articles to G. W. Foote's Freethinker, having previously written accounts of his lecture tours. In 1898 he became assistant editor of The Freethinker, and after Foote's death in 1915 he was appointed editor. Cohen had written for other freethought journals before joining The Freethinker, and had briefly edited The Truthseeker, owned by J.W. Gott. Cohen also succeeded Foote as President of the National Secular Society.

Foote's tradition of militant journalism was maintained by Chapman, although the style changed from an emphasis on biblical criticism to criticism of religion based on a materialistic philosophy and the findings of science, particularly evolution. Chapman was a prolific author and his writing is characterised by a clarity of style and intellectual rigour.

Between the wars Chapman dominated the NSS. A study of Chapman's engagements as listed in The Freethinker reveal that during the 1919 indoor lecturing season, he spoke at no less than 34 venues on more than 50 occasions. Venues included Manchester and Leicester (often), Abertillery, South Shields, Swansea, Glasgow, Paisley, Edinburgh, Liverpool, Belfast, Leeds. Subjects included "Christianity, the Army and the Nation", "Freethought, Religion and Death" and "God and Evolution". In 1919 he also debated with the Glasgow spiritualists. His engagements for 1935 show there was little sign of a reduction in his commitments.

His approach to his lectures and debates was similar and he was well known for his quickfire responses and sharp humour. A story related by Cohen's son Raymond to this contributor makes the point. At one meeting the issue of deathbed recantations came up. At the time it was believed that Napoleon had been a heretic who recanted on his deathbed and begged for God’s mercy. During the meeting a heckler shouted "What did Napoleon say on his deathbed?" Cohen looked puzzled, scratched his head and replied "Not tonight, Josephine?”

In 1940, summarising his own contribution to the secularist movement, Cohen wrote:

For about forty-four years I have been busy in the interests of Freethought with my pen as well as with my tongue, and for about forty-two years I have been a regular writer for one of the oldest Freethought journals in Europe, and with a single exception, the oldest in the world. For twenty-four years I have been the official editor of that journal, and for the same period, President of the National Secular Society, the only organisation for the propagation of militant Freethought in the British Isles.

My career as a lecturer – continuously lecturing – is a record in the history of the Freethought movement.

As such Cohen is both the longest serving President of the NSS and the longest serving editor of The Freethinker. However, his greatest memorial is his writings both numerous books and pamphlets and in the columns of The Freethinker. The series of eighteen Pamphlets for the People makes the case for freethought and secularism with great clarity and force. His Almost an Autobiography (1940) gives just a little insight into a very private man although it deals mainly with his opinions presented with his characteristic panache and humour.

According to Edward Royle (2004), "as an organizer Cohen did much to build up the resources of secularism in the inter-war years, but by 1949, when he was persuaded to resign as president, many members felt he had stayed on too long."

Cohen remained editor of The Freethinker until 1951, when he retired and was replaced by F.A. Ridley.

== Impact ==
Stanley describes Cohen as "highly visible" and according to David Berman (writing before the present prominence of writers such as Richard Dawkins), Cohen was "probably the last popular and popularist champion of atheism in Britain".

On his death, The Times printed a short obituary of Cohen, which said:

He was the author of many books setting forth the freethought philosophy of life, which had a large sale, and he was outstanding as a forthright, witty and courteous debater and lecturer.

He was cremated at St. Albans crematorium.

== Publications ==
- Pamphlets for the People: Nos 1-18. London: Pioneer Press, 1916.
- Almost an autobiography: confessions of a freethinker. London: Pioneer Press, 1940.
- Essays in freethinking: first series. London: Pioneer Press, 1923.
- Essays in freethinking: second series. London: Pioneer Press, 1927.
- Essays in freethinking: third series. London: Pioneer Press, 1928.
- Essays in freethinking: fourth series. London: Pioneer Press, 1938.
- Essays in freethinking: fifth series. London: Pioneer Press, 1939.
- Essays in freethinking: volume one. Reprint of Essays in freethinking, first and second series. Revised edition. Austin, Texas: American Atheist Press, 1987.
- Essays in freethinking: volume two. Reprint of Essays in freethinking, third and fourth series. Revised edition. Austin, Texas: American Atheist Press, 1987.
- God and the universe: Eddington, Jeans, Huxley and Einstein. London: Pioneer Press, 1931.
- A Grammar of Freethought. London: Pioneer Press, 1921.
- Materialism restated. London: Pioneer Press, 1927 (3rd edition 1943).
- Materialism : Has it been Exploded ?, London : Watts & Co., 1928. Verbatim Report of Debate between Chapman Cohen and C.E.M. Joad.
- Opinions, random reflections and wayside sayings. London: Pioneer Press, 1931.
- Religion and sex: studies in the pathology of religious development. London/Edinburgh: T. N. Foulis, 1919. Reprint, New York: AMS Press, 1975.
- Theism or atheism: the great alternative. London: Pioneer Press, 1921.
- The Other Side of Death: A Critical Examination of the Belief in a Future Life, with a Study of Spiritualism. London: Pioneer Press, 1922.
- War, civilization and the churches. London: Pioneer Press, 1930.
- Determinism or Free Will? Walter Scott, 1912. 2nd edition revised and enlarged. Pioneer Press, 1919.

== Bibliography ==
- Berman, David (1988, 1990). A History of Atheism in Britain, From Hobbes to Russell. London: Routledge.
- Cohen, Chapman (1940). Almost an autobiography: the confessions of a freethinker. London: Pioneer Press.
- Herrick, Jim (1982). Vision and Realism: 100 years of The Freeethinker. London: G.W. Foote & Co. Ltd.
- Royle, Edward (2004). "Cohen, Chapman (1868–1954)", Oxford Dictionary of National Biography, Oxford University Press, Retrieved 23 July 2009.
- Stanley, Matthew (2008). "Mysticism and Marxism: A.S. Eddington, Chapman Cohen, and political engagement through science popularization." Minerva, Vol. 46 (2), June, pp. 181–194. Online
