= Denis Cobell =

Denis Cobell (born 1938) is a prominent UK secularist, humanist, republican and pacifist. He was President of the National Secular Society from 1997 to 2006.

== Early life ==
Cobell was born in Hove just before the Second World War. His parents were strict evangelical Christians; his father was a lay preacher. Cobell was baptised and attended St Nicolas's Church of England School in Portslade. Following the 11-plus examinations he went to Hove County Grammar School for Boys.

== Working life ==
Cobell began his training as a nurse at Southlands Hospital, Shoreham-by-Sea, in 1956. He moved to London in 1960 and worked at Guy's Hospital for over 30 years, finally becoming a senior nurse. In 1994 he shifted from full-time to part-time, continuing to work for the National Health Service until he finally retired in December 2004 (after 48 years in the NHS).

== Family ==
Cobell married in 1968 and has three children and three grandchildren.

== Atheism, secularism and humanism ==
In his late teens, Denis Cobell spent time at Hove Public Library reading a variety of books including works by Bertrand Russell, who he was to meet at his North Wales home in 1959. He discovered both the Unitarian Church in New Road Brighton and the Brighton and Hove Humanist Group. In terms of developing his atheist views, Denis Cobell had some interesting conversations. He talked with the Rev John Rowland of the Unitarians. John Rowland had worked for the Rationalist Press Association on the Literary Guide (precursor to the New Humanist magazine) and wrote in The Freethinker. During this time Cobell also met the feminist author Daisy L. Hobman, who was the initiator of the Brighton and Hove Humanist Group. Denis was invited to give a talk at the Group's first public meeting.

Cobell started writing for secular / humanist and socialist publications from the late 1950s and also spoke at Speakers' Corner in Hyde Park during the 1960s and 1970s. He also co edited the Hyde Park Socialist quarterly paper from 1968 to 1984; a regular contributor to this paper was FA Ridley, a former President of the National Secular Society.

Cobell joined the Lewisham Humanist Group in 1973 and has been the Hon Secretary since 1974.

He continues to officiate at many secular funerals, baby namings and weddings.

He was Humanist Chaplain to the Mayor of Lewisham 1998-99 and also the Humanist Chaplain to Greenwich Hospital, and Chaplain to UK Armed Forces Humanist Association.

He is a Director of the publishing company responsible for The Freethinker.

Cobell joined the Council of the National Secular Society in 1976, and became president in 1997. He stepped down as president in 2006 but remained on the Society's Council of Management. He has announced that he will retire from the Council in 2009.

== Other activities ==
Cobell is a pacifist and is currently Chair of the Right to Refuse to Kill (RRK) Group for recognition of conscientious objectors. He was a signatory to the "Manifesto of the Third Camp Against US Militarism and Islamic Terrorism".

Cobell was Treasurer of Brighton Young Liberals in 1959–60; the chairman was Navnit Dholakia, later Lord Dholakia, who was President of the Liberal Democrats, 2000–2004.

== Works and articles ==
Over 300 articles and reviews in various journals - including The Freethinker, Guy's King's & St Thomas' Gazette, New Humanist, Nursing Mirror, Nursing Standard and Socialist Leader.

== Bibliography ==
=== Secularism and humanism ===
- Alternative Christmas message. BBC Radio London, 25 December 1995. Transcript available online here:
- Right of Reply. The Independent, 2 November 1998. Available online here:
- Review of 'Humanism' by Barbara Smoker. Gay and Lesbian Humanist, Autumn 1998. Available online here:
- Review of 'All in the Mind', by Ludovic Kennedy. Gay and Lesbian Humanist, Summer 1999.Available online here:
- "Losing my religion", Nursing Standard, Vol. 16 (20), 30 January - 5 February 2002, pp. 20–21.

=== Health ===
- "The origin and history of syphillis" [sic?], Nursing Mirror, 17 September 1965, p. 120-.
- Du Plessis, P., Bor, R., Slack, D., Swash, E., Cobell, D. (1995). "Assessment of HIV Counselling and Social Care Services in a London Hospital", British Journal of Guidance & Counselling, Vol. 23 (1), pp. 45–51
