= Robert Forder =

English publisher (1844 – 1901)

Robert Joseph Forder (14 October 1844 – 14 August 1901) was an English freethinker, radical, publisher and bookseller and birth controller. He was particularly associated with the career of Charles Bradlaugh and the National Secular Society (NSS).

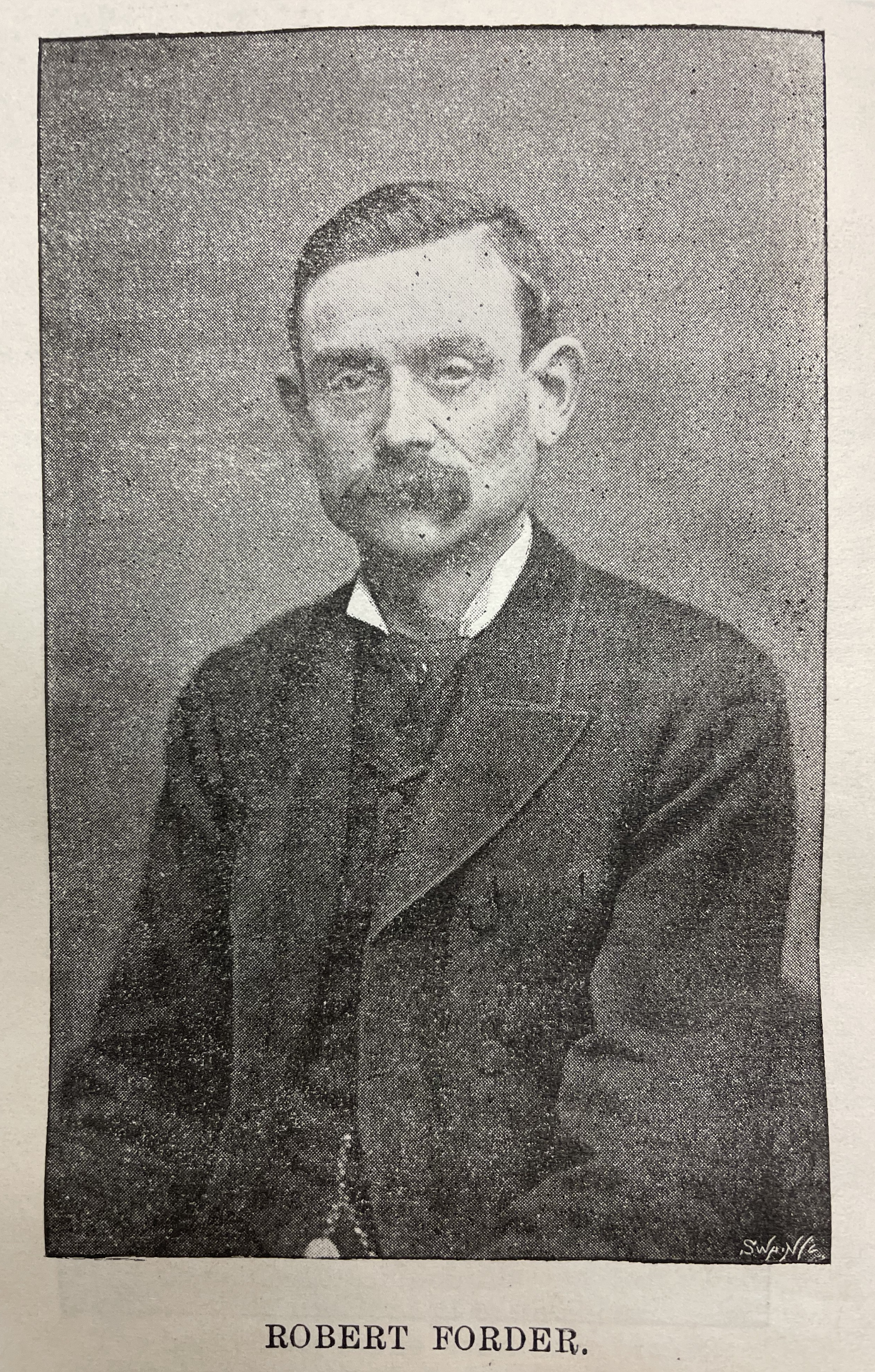
Reproduction of photograph of Robert Forder (published in the Freethinker, 1893)

Forder was born in Yarmouth, Norfolk and was of humble, rural origins. He received little in the way of formal education. At the age of 16 he moved to Deptford and, having failed to be accepted by the army because he was too puny, obtained employment in Deptford with a marine engineer's. He then moved to Woolwich and obtained work at the Arsenal. It was in Woolwich that he first began to move in radical circles and became a familiar speaker at open air venues throughout London - Kennington, Smithfield, Mile End Waste etc. In 1862 he encountered Charles Bradlaugh at a meeting in Hyde Park and in 1865 went on to join The Reform League.

By 1875 he had joined the NSS Council and in 1877 became the first paid secretary of the organisation after the brief temporary tenure of George Standring. This followed Bradlaugh and Annie Besant falling out with Charles Watts (the original NSS secretary) over Bradlaugh and Besant's republication of the pioneering birth control pamphlet Charles Knowlton's 'Fruits of Philosophy'

As secretary of the NSS Forder was closely involved with Bradlaugh's successful campaigns to publish birth control literature at a price all could afford and from 1880-1886 to enter the House of Commons as an MP for Northampton when initially barred due to his atheism.

After Bradlaugh's resignation as President of the NSS and his death in 1891, Forder took over the freethinkers' publishing and bookselling business which Bradlaugh and Besant had established at 28 Stonecutter Street, close to Fleet Street. From this address, and until his death, Forder continued to publish and sell literature from what will have been London's leading radical bookshop and publishing house of its era. In particular, he became the leading supplier of birth control literature, referred to then as 'Malthusian literature'. This included Henry Allbutt's "Wife's Handbook" which went on to sell over 500,000 copies.
