= David Tribe =

Australian humanist

David Harold Tribe
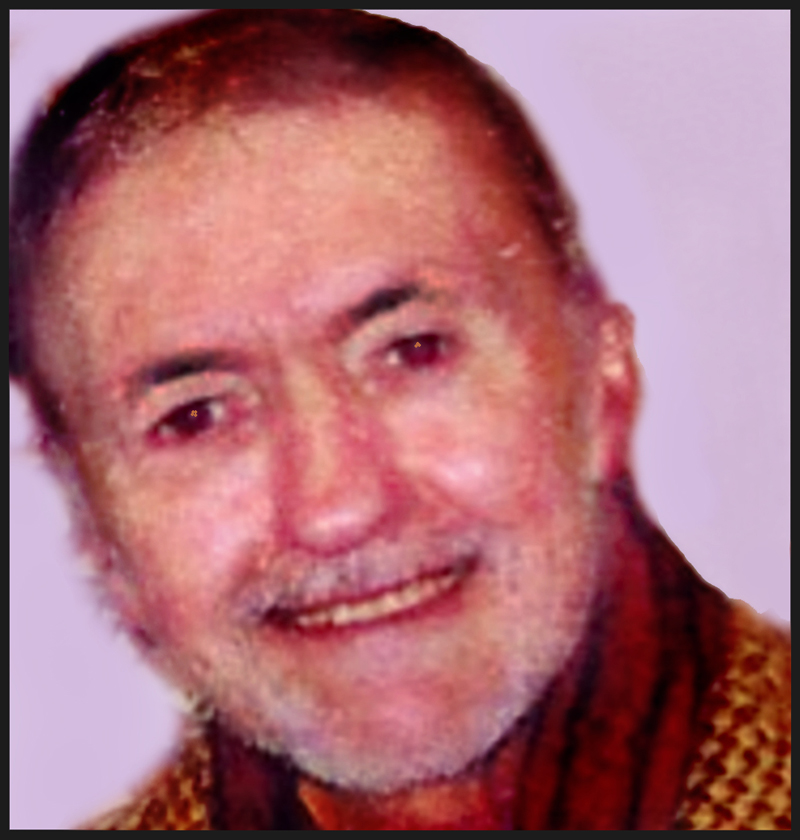
- David Tribe around 2000
- Born: 17 December 1931; Sydney, Australia
- Died: 30 May 2017 (aged 85); Mosman, NSW, Australia
- Occupation: Author

David Harold Tribe (1931–2017) was an Australian secularist, humanist, and author of numerous books, articles and pamphlets. He was born in Sydney, Australia, grew up in Brisbane, and lived in the United Kingdom from the 1950s into the 1970s.

== Biography ==
David was the top student in Queensland for both primary and secondary schooling. He achieved a Lilley Memorial Medal in 1945, was the top boy in the Junior examination in 1947, and then top student in the State's Senior examination in 1949. His family lived in the suburb of St Lucia, Queensland, where he attended Ironside State School, and then Brisbane State High School, where he was dux.

In Nucleoethics he admitted that despite such success, he did not recall "a golden childhood" and was "immensely relieved to outgrow my youthful fears and persecutors". David was an only child, and says he had few close friends. David describes his parents as of Anglican and Methodist origins, but they briefly associated with the Plymouth Brethren after he had been attending one of their Sunday schools. A grandmother turned Seventh-day Adventist. But his parents drifted back via Baptists and Church of Christ to the Methodists, although there were some evangelical and "American hot-gospelling rallies" along the way. David liked the Methodists who "wore their religion lightly". Then, "after a period in the ideological wilderness, I entered the infidel movement".

After achieving various bursaries and fellowships he studied medicine at the University of Queensland. Here he edited Trephine, the annual magazine of the University's Medical Society, and demonstrated talent as a singer and actor - appearing in Noël Coward's Blithe Spirit (play) in 1953. He represented the State several times in the University debating competition. He also enjoyed painting. He had early literary aspirations, filing for copyright in 1954 a work entitled Harem by Installments (The Autobiography of Al B Manleigh Jnr), which does not seem to have ever been published.

Despite his academic success, and after having wished to be a doctor since primary school, Tribe found he did not enjoy hospital and medical work. He chose not to qualify as a doctor, and left Australia for Britain some time soon after 1954 to pursue a literary career. He worked in various jobs as a sketch artist, public relations officer, and journalist and became a lecturer in liberal studies, English language and literature, British life and institutions, journalism and humanism.

In Britain, Tribe was chair of Humanist Group Action (1961–1964), president of the National Secular Society (1963–1971), editor of The Freethinker (1966). He was also an executive committee member of the National Council for Civil Liberties (1961–1972). A close ally in the National Secular Society, Bill McIlroy, commented on his work there: "Although he has never been popular with those in the movement who are ready to compromise with opponents before the first shot has been fired, David Tribe enjoys the respect and support of people who value clear thinking, plain speaking and a respect for principles." During his time at the National Secular Society he was particularly concerned with the problem of religion in schools. Another member, Denis Cobell, who later became president of the society, recalled David as a powerful orator and debater, who would harangue other speakers, at Speakers Corner in Hyde Park, and Conway Hall, right back to the late fifties.

Tribe closely observed any groups with which he became involved. He saw selfish and sinful behaviours among the religious groups, and turned an equally stern eye on the secular groups he made his home in. In Nucleoethics in 1972 he observed: "In so far as there were no creeds, dietary and other tabus there was less occasion for humbug. I did, however, find that there were some humanists ... who thought ... about 'changed lives' as a result of some new humanist insight into living. What precisely this was I was never, despite involvement in the centre of humanist affairs, able to find out. I happened to find a materialist interpretation of the world more plausible and a libertarian attitude to sex and other appetites more congenial than the one I was brought up in (perhaps I was never really 'saved'), but I was unable to see that in everyday matters of tolerance, balanced judgement, truthfulness, trustworthiness, and the rest humanists were any better than anyone else".

David returned to Australia in 1972 to look after his terminally ill father, William Harold Tribe. He continued to contribute to secularist, rationalist and humanist organisations, but did not again hold office-bearer roles. From 1973 to 1987 he worked in the NSW Public Service on publicity, public relations and policy most notably in environmental protection and recycling.

His years of work on environmental policy did not prevent him later entering debate in humanist journals expressing doubt regarding anthropogenic global warming and climate change (AGWCC) stating in 2013: "if scientific consensuses have political and commercial consequences, entire populations can be adversely affected. AGWCC is very complex. Whether it turns out to be 'absolute crap' or 'the greatest moral challenge of our time' seems unlikely to be settled in my lifetime". David Tribe had already expressed stern observations on scientists in Nucleoethics. "Now it seemed to me that in science ... even more than in the arts the great bulk of people ... were chasing a meal-ticket or social status rather than quenching any passionate search for knowledge. ... Within the rigours of their own disciplines, trendiness, deference to authority, purblind commitment to pet theories, however discredited, wilfulness, jealousy and One-up-manship were more noticeable than outsiders imagine. Outside their professional competence, they showed no greater resistance than non-scientists to mythology, ancient or modern ... and no less tendency to 'irrationalism' in everyday life. Even when their professional researches were models of objectivity and humility, these did not necessarily spill over into their private lives and influence their moral judgements".

In 2001, Tribe became an honorary associate of Rationalist International. In 2005 he put $300,000 into a foundation to establish the University of Sydney's "David Harold Tribe Awards" in fiction, poetry, philosophy, sculpture, and symphony.

In May 2017, severe illness placed him in Sydney's Royal North Shore Hospital, from where he was sent to Montana Nursing Home in the nearby suburb of Mosman. On Tuesday 30 May, he woke and enjoyed a supper, but was found peacefully deceased later that evening.

== Bibliography ==
- Religion and human rights (19__) London: National Secular Society.
- Secular education (19__) London: National Secular Society.
- Freethought and Humanism in Shakespeare (1964). London: Pioneer Press.
- Agnostic adoption (1965). London: National Secular Society.
- Religion and Ethics in Schools (1965). London: National Secular Society.
- Why are We Here? (a poem) (1965). London: Outposts Publications.
- School morality without religion (1967). London : National Secular Society.
- Universal affirmation (1967). London : National Secular Society.
- The scandal of religious broadcasting (1967). London : National Secular Society.
- 100 Years of Freethought (1967). London: Elek Books.
- Humanism, Christianity, and Sex (1968). London: National Secular Society.
- Figure in a Japanese landscape (1970). Frensham : Sceptre Press.
- The Cost of Church Schools (1970). London: National Secular Society.
- The open society and its friends (1971) London: National Secular Society.
- President Charles Bradlaugh, MP (1971). London: Elek Books. ISBN 0-236-17726-5
- Nucleoethics: Ethics in Modern Society (1972). London: MacGibbon and Kee. ISBN 0-261-63266-3
- Broadcasting, Brainwashing, Conditioning (1972). London: National Secular Society. ISBN 0-903752-01-8
- Questions of Censorship (1973). London: Allen & Unwin. ISBN 0-04-701007-X
- The Rise of the Mediocracy (1975). London: Allen & Unwin. ISBN 0-04-300057-6
- Words and Ideas (2009). Sydney: Humanist Society of NSW. ISBN 978-0-9807165-0-4

=== Essays and columns ===
- Tribe, David (March 2012). "Why the net is over-rated". Backburn. Australian Author. 44 (1): 21.
