= Terry Sanderson (writer) =

British LGBT rights activist, secularist, author and journalist (1946–2022)

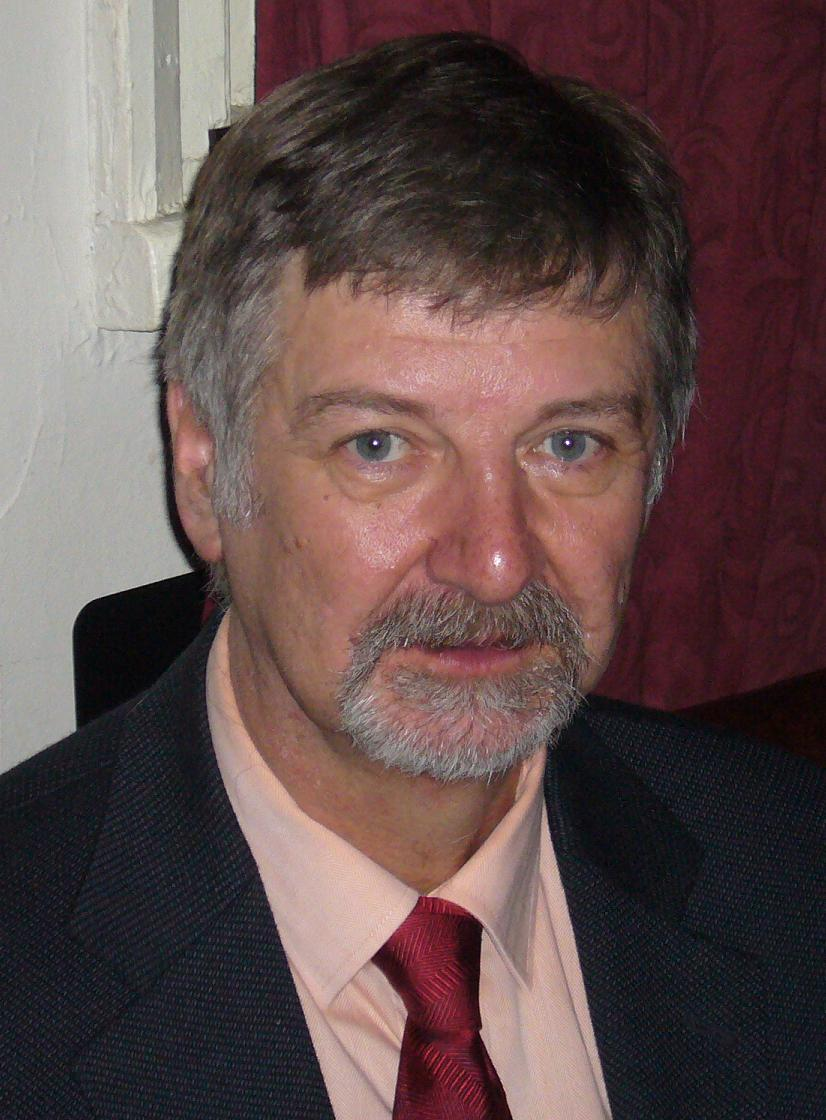
- Born: Terence Arthur Sanderson; 16 November 1946; Maltby, South Yorkshire, England
- Died: 12 June 2022 (aged 75)
- Occupations: Secularist, gay rights activist, author, journalist
- Partner: Keith Porteous Wood
- Website: gtmediawatch.org

Terence Arthur Sanderson (16 November 1946 – 12 June 2022) was a leading British secularist and gay rights activist, author, and journalist. He served as president of the National Secular Society from 2006 to 2017 and was a long-standing columnist for Gay Times.

== Early life and career ==
In 1946, Sanderson was born to a poor mining family in the South Yorkshire village of Maltby. He came out as gay after starting work in Rotherham at the age of seventeen. His parents found out after reading an interview with Sanderson in a local newspaper, concerning his booking a venue for a meeting of the Campaign for Homosexual Equality. Moving to London in the early 1970s, Sanderson worked as a disability support worker or other similar jobs, and on the Woman's Own.

== Career ==
Terry Sanderson chairing a panel discussion on religion at the Secular Conference 2014

Sanderson began campaigning for equality for gay people in 1969. His MediaWatch columns for Gay Times have been a feature since 1982, and were described as "probably the most informative record of the extent of press homophobia in the UK in the 1980s". In 1986, after experiencing problems with a Christian-owned publisher, Sanderson established The Other Way Press as a specifically gay-themed publishing house. Sanderson was elected President of the National Secular Society in 2006, having previously served as a vice-president for a number of years. He helped organize protests during the state visit by Pope Benedict XVI to the United Kingdom.

== Personal life ==
Sanderson was in a relationship with Keith Porteous Wood, the current president of the National Secular Society. They had been together for over two decades before the recognition of same-sex relationships by the state, and they entered into a civil partnership in 2006. In 2015 his autobiography The Adventures of a Happy Homosexual was published and then revised with a new epilogue in 2021 as The Reluctant Gay Activist following his diagnosis and treatment for bladder cancer. His cancer returned in 2022 and he died at his home in London on 12 June that year, aged 75.

== Works ==
- How to be a Happy Homosexual (1986) London: The Other Way Press, ISBN 0-948982-00-4, (5th ed, 1999)
- The Potts Correspondence and Other Gay Humour (1987) London: The Other Way Press, ISBN 0-948982-01-2
- "Gays and the Press" (1989), in Shepherd, Simon and Wallis, Mick, Coming on strong: gay politics and culture London: Routledge; Chapter 13, pp. 231–241,ISBN 0-04-445352-3
- Making Gay Relationships Work (1990) London: The Other Way Press, ISBN 0-948982-02-0
- Stranger in the Family: how to cope if your child is gay (1991) London: The Other Way Press, ISBN 0-948982-03-9, (2nd ed, 1996)
- Mediawatch: treatment of male and female homosexuality in the British media (1995) London: Continuum International Publishing, ISBN 978-0-304-33186-4
- The Potts Papers (1996) London: The Other Way Press, ISBN 0-948982-09-8
- Assertively Gay: how to build gay self-esteem (1997) 2nd revised edition, London: The Other Way Press, ISBN 978-0-948982-10-1
- The Gay Man's Kama Sutra (2003) London: Carlton Books, ISBN 978-1-84222-794-7
- The Adventures of a Happy Homosexual: Memoirs of an Unlikely Activist (2015) The Otherway Press ISBN 978-1786102331
- The Reluctant Gay Activist (2021) Independently published, ISBN 979-8452007791
