= Edward Royle =

British academic (born 1944)

Edward Royle (born 29 March 1944) is a British academic who is Emeritus Professor of History at the University of York and author of several books on the history of religious ideas, particularly in York and Yorkshire.

== Career ==
Royle gained his PhD at the University of Cambridge. He spent the majority of his career in the Department of History at the University of York, where he retired as an emeritus professor. He is an active member of the University's Centre for Eighteenth-Century Studies. His main research interests have been in the history of York and Yorkshire since the mid-eighteenth century.

Professor Royle is a local Methodist Preacher.

== Works ==
- Radical Politics, 1790–1900: Religion and Unbelief. Longman. 1971.
- Victorian Infidels: the Origins of the British Secularist Movement, 1791–1861 (PDF). Manchester University Press. 1974. Archived from the original (PDF) on 30 October 2005.
- (as editor) Infidel Tradition: From Paine to Bradlaugh. Macmillan. 1976.
- Radicals, Secularists and Republicans: popular freethought in Britain, 1866–1915. Manchester University Press. 1980. ISBN 9780847662944.
- (with James Walvin) English Radicials and Reformers 1760–1848. University Press of Kentucky. 1982.
- The Victorian Church in York. Borthwick Paper. Vol. 64. Borthwick Institute. 1983.
- Nonconformity in Nineteenth-century York. Borthwick Paper. Vol. 68. Borthwick Institute. 1985.
- A History of the Nonconformist Churches of York. Borthwick Texts and Calendars. Vol. 18. Borthwick Institute. 1993.
- Chartism (3rd ed.). Longman. 1996.
- Modern Britain: A Social History 1750–1997 (2nd ed.). Arnold. 1997.
- Robert Owen and the Commencement of the Millennium. A study of the Harmony Community. Manchester University Press. 1998. ISBN 9780719054266.
- The Eighteenth-Century Church in Yorkshire. Borthwick Paper. Vol. 95. Borthwick Institute. 1999.
- Revolutionary Britannia? Reflections on the Threats of Revolution in Britain, 1789–1848. Manchester University Press. 2000. ISBN 9780719048036.
- (editor, with Ruth M. Larsen) Archbishop Thomson's Visitation Returns for the Diocese of York, 1865. Borthwick Texts and Studies. Vol. 34. Borthwick Institute. 2006.
