= National Secular Society =

British campaigning organisation founded in 1866

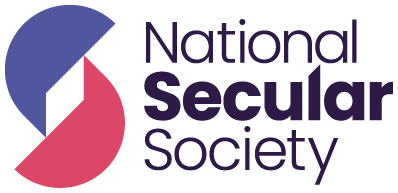
- Formation: 1866; 160 years ago
- Founder: Charles Bradlaugh
- Type: NGO
- Legal status: Limited company
- Headquarters: London
- Region served: United Kingdom
- President: Keith Porteous Wood
- Executive Director: Stephen Evans
- Website: www.secularism.org.uk

The National Secular Society (NSS) is a British campaigning organisation that promotes secularism and the separation of church and state. It holds that no one should gain advantage or disadvantage because of their religion or lack of it. The Society was founded in 1866 by Charles Bradlaugh.

== Objectives ==
The NSS, whose motto is "Challenging religious privilege", campaigns for a secular state where there is no established state religion; where religion plays no role in state-funded education, does not interfere with the judicial process nor does it restrict freedom of expression; where the state does not intervene in matters of religious doctrine nor does it promote or fund religious activities, guaranteeing every citizen's freedom to believe, not to believe or to change religion.

Although the organisation was explicitly created for those who reject the supernatural, the NSS does not campaign to eradicate or prohibit religion, arguing that freedom of religion, as well as freedom from religion, is a human right and that state sponsorship of selected religions encroaches upon that right. It holds that belief should be a private matter for the home or place of worship and does not belong in the public sphere. In seeking to represent the interests and viewpoints of atheists, the NSS is often critical of what it sees as the damaging effects of religion.

== History ==
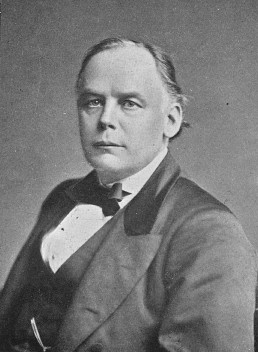
Charles Bradlaugh, the founder of the National Secular Society

The National Secular Society was founded in 1866 with Charles Bradlaugh as president and Charles Watts as secretary. There were a number of secularist groups around the UK and they joined up to coordinate and strengthen their campaigns. The word secularism was coined by George Holyoake in 1851. The NSS's principles asserted that "this is the only life we have, and that we should work for its improvement".

In 1877 Bradlaugh and Annie Besant were prosecuted for publishing a book containing birth control information, The Fruits of Philosophy by the American doctor Charles Knowlton. They were convicted, but acquitted on appeal. The issue of contraception, which the NSS advocated, divided secularists and a breakaway group, the British Secular Union, was formed. It closed after a few years.

Bradlaugh's struggle to enter Parliament became an important moment in the development of 19th-century secularism. He was elected for Northampton in 1880. He believed he had the right to affirm rather than swear on the Bible, but when refused, said he would take the oath. He was told that since he did not believe in the Bible he could not swear on it. For six years he struggled to overcome this problem, by legal and electoral methods. In 1886 a new government allowed him to be sworn in. He later brought about a change giving all MPs the right to affirm. He was a very active MP on behalf of the poor, the Irish and Indian independence.

Bradlaugh, who died in 1891, was succeeded as president by G. W. Foote, editor of The Freethinker. Foote noted that the death of Bradlaugh brought the "heroic period" of freethought to an end, and he never succeeded in galvanising NSS members as Bradlaugh had done. Foote's successor was Chapman Cohen (president from 1915 to 1949), a prolific pamphleteer and author of books on religion and philosophy for a popular audience. In the first half of the twentieth century the NSS campaigned against the BBC's religious broadcasting policy, for disestablishment and for secular education.

Notable presidents in the second half of the 20th century were David Tribe and Barbara Smoker, who did much to increase the use of the media to put across secularist views. In the 21st century, the NSS continues as an organisation campaigning in the UK and EU against what it regards as religious privilege in public life.

== Organisation ==
The NSS is incorporated as a UK Company Limited by Guarantee, no. 01418145. The Society's income in the year 2006–2007 was £232,149, as quoted in the Accounts submitted to the authorities at Companies House. It receives no funding from the government or outside bodies: its campaigning is wholly supported by membership subscriptions and donations. Membership numbers are not included on the NSS website, although an article in The Daily Telegraph on 13 February 2012 stated that the society had about 7,000 members.

== Education and faith schools ==
Education is one of the NSS's prime concerns, and it continues to campaign against public funding of faith schools. It holds that morality, ethics and citizenship should be taught outside a religious framework. It also opposes the teaching of creationism, or intelligent design as an alternative to mainstream science. In addition, it is against the appointment of teachers and support staff according to religious criteria, as part of a more general campaign against exemptions from anti-discrimination legislation for religious bodies. The Society has successfully campaigned for the legal right of older pupils to opt themselves out of religious assemblies at school.

The Society argues that children of families of no-faith and "the wrong faith" are being increasingly discriminated against in admission procedures, because of the high number of religious schools. Together with City Technology Colleges (which also have admissions privileges), the Society would like to see these schools become community schools, although it accepts the need for a transition period to achieve this goal. The NSS has drawn attention to recent statistical research supporting its claims of discrimination in faith schools, based on selection of pupils from wealthier families. Specifically, religious schools take in 10% fewer poor pupils than are representative of the local area. However, both representatives from the Church of England and a separate Parent Association denied the existence or evidence of selection to their own schools being based on social background, and a spokesman for the Centre of Economics has indicated that the bias in social background may stem from those more likely to apply to a religious school, not the selection process.

The NSS has claimed that faith schools exacerbate religious, ethnic and cultural divisions, by separating children from those of other faiths and cultural backgrounds. In 2010, the NSS instigated a judicial review to test the legality of prayers being part of the official business of Council meetings, as it believes politics and religion should be kept separate.

== Other campaigns ==
The NSS has campaigned on a number of other issues. These include the successful abolition of the blasphemy law in the United Kingdom; removal of the 26 bishops from the House of Lords; exemption of religious organisations from discrimination and equality laws; withdrawal of state funding of chaplains in prisons, hospitals and armed services; the end of tax exemption for churches; and stopping public funding of religious broadcasting (the NSS has long argued, for example, that Thought for the Day is religious propaganda broadcast by the BBC at licence-payers' expense).

Further campaigns are concerned with the conscientious objections by doctors and pharmacists to refuse to administer certain procedures or treatments; the religious exemption from laws requiring stunning of animals before slaughter and for the labelling of meat produced without stunning (much of it is currently sold to the general public unlabelled, both in shops and in restaurants); and the reform of the Scouts movement to remove references to God from their promise.

The NSS is frequently invited to submit consultation documents to Government and major UK organisations. For example, it has written about faith-based welfare; doctors' conscientious objections; the prosecution of racist and religious crimes; the census; organ donation; and equality issues.

It co-sponsored the launch of the Council of Ex-Muslims of Britain and a conference for International Women's Day – Women's Rights, the Veil and Islamic and Religious Laws.

As well as its activities in the UK, the NSS has been active in Europe and at the UN, often as a representative for the International Humanist and Ethical Union (IHEU). Most notable have been interventions at the Council of Europe and the European Parliament.

At a Council of Europe conference in San Marino, its interventions caused the closing communiqué to be changed to require consultation on inter-cultural matters, giving much more emphasis to civil society, as opposed to religious bodies. In Strasbourg, the NSS argued against what it saw as undue religious influence on the Council of Europe. Close links have been maintained with the politicians and secretariat.

The NSS started assisting Roy Brown on the UN Human Rights Council in Geneva, and continues on a broader front, raising awareness of its problems with a growing list of international bodies.

In the European Parliament (EP), the NSS is involved with the Separation of Religion & Politics Working Group, and attended the launch of the Brussels Declaration. The organisation's president, Keith Porteous Wood, also spoke at a meeting in the EP sponsored by Catholics for Choice on Religion & Politics in the New Europe, and made a representation in a debate to the EP President about an invitation to the Pope to address the EP. The Society continues to be consulted by politicians seeking information or proposals. Wood spoke about problems with the United Nations Human Rights Commission at a UDHR 60th Anniversary Conference in Brussels, and at the Libre Penseé Conference at the Senate in Paris.

On 2 December 2011, the NSS and an atheist councillor took Bideford Town Council to the High Court over prayers held during council meetings. The High Court ruled on 10 February 2012 that the town council was not acting lawfully, as under Section 111 of the Local Government Act 1972 councils could not do anything they were not specifically permitted to do by the act. As prayers were not mentioned by the act, they could not be held as a formal part of the meeting. However, the judge tempered this ruling by rejecting Councillor Bone's argument that his human rights had been breached, stating that prayers could be held as long as councillors were not summoned to attend and they did not appear as an item on the agenda. Mr Justice Ouseley declared that the fact that atheists might feel uncomfortable during prayers was not a reason for them to be granted the protection of the state under human rights law, which had been the argument of the NSS's counsel. At the time of the case, the 1972 act was being superseded by the Localism Act 2011, which gave councils a general power of competence 'to do anything individuals may generally do.' In light of the ruling, the law was brought into force ahead of schedule in February 2012, and its general power of competence was asserted to have restored the ability of councils to hold prayers as part of the meeting should the majority of them wish to do so. To remove any remaining confusion, in March 2015 the Local Government (Religious etc. Observances) Act 2015 was granted Royal Assent, explicitly restoring the right of councils to hold prayers as a formal part of meetings should they wish.

The NSS has campaigned against the practice of some local authorities in granting parking concessions to churchgoers. In 2011, the NSS announced its intention to take forward a legal challenge against Woking Borough Council, which allowed those attending services in churches close to the town centre to claim a refund of their parking charges. The policy was retained following a review, but the council indicated the scheme could be extended to members of all religious communities or voluntary organisations on a case-by-case basis. Some councillors were critical of the challenge and the amount spent on defending the policy, with one councillor referring to the National Secular Society as 'bullying and intolerant.'

In February 2019, the NSS released a 48-page report titled For the Public Benefit? The case of removing 'the advancement of religion' as a charitable purpose. It argues that the advancement of religion should not be 'regarded as an inherent public good', and charities should be required to 'demonstrate a tangible, secular public benefit under one of the other charitable purpose headings'.

In 2023, the NSS reported over 40 Islamic charities to the Charity Commission for divisive or extremist rhetoric, and reiterated their call for a reform to charity law, writing: "Charities registered under 'the advancement of religion' are uniquely enabled to promote regressive and hateful messages in a way they could not under any other charitable purpose." One of these, Fountains of Knowledge, opened the mosque at which the suspect in the 2025 Manchester synagogue attack worshipped. The NSS responded that the incident "underlines the urgent need to reform charity law".

The NSS has been vocally opposed to "medically unnecessary genital cutting" including female genital mutilation and male circumcision. The group takes the stance that non-medical circumcision on children is forced circumcision and only an adult can consent to the practice being performed on them. In 2024, they submitted information to the UK parliament encouraging regulation and an age of consent for circumcision. The document briefly touches on many circumcision controversies and roots the perspective firmly in the concept of freedom of religion, especially the freedom from religion. The group's perspective on FGM is that the laws banning the practice are not enforced thoroughly enough.

== Secularist of the Year award ==
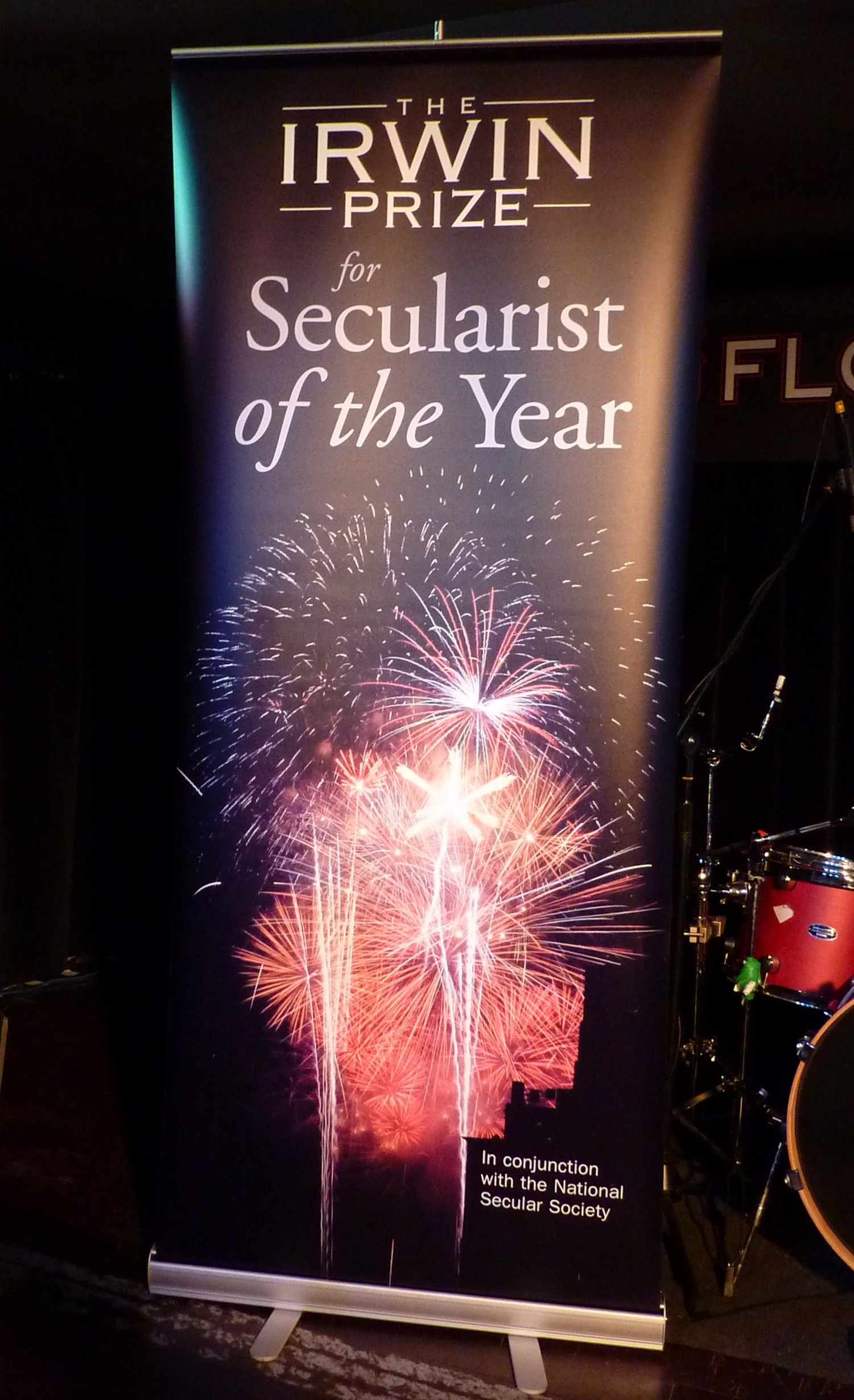
The Secularist of the Year poster used at the ceremony

Each year, the NSS holds the Secularist of the Year award ceremony at which the Irwin Prize of £5,000 is presented. Nominations for the Secularist of the Year are made by members of the National Secular Society; the winner is chosen by the Officers of the Society, along with Michael Irwin, who has donated the funds which underpin the award. Previous prize winners include former Liberal Democrat Member of Parliament (MP) Evan Harris; Eric Lubbock, 4th Baron Avebury; Sophie in 't Veld MEP; and Peter Tatchell.

== Presidents ==
- Charles Bradlaugh (1866–1890) (A. Trevelyan held the Presidency, 1871–1872)
- GW Foote (1890–died 17 October 1915)
- Chapman Cohen (1915–1949)
- R.H. Rosetti (1949–died 2 December 1951)
- F.A. Ridley (18 December 1951 – 1963)
- David Tribe (1963 – June 1971)
- Ethel Venton (June 1971 – 1972)
- Barbara Smoker (1972 −1996)
- Daniel O'Hara (1996–1997)
- Denis Cobell (1997–2006)
- Terry Sanderson (2006–2017)
- Keith Porteous Wood (2017–)

== Secretaries ==
- 1866: Charles Watts
- 1876: George Standring
- 1877: Robert Forder
- 1892: Edith Vance
- 1927: John Seibert
- 1951: P. V. Morris
- 1955: Colin McCall
- 1963: William McIlroy
- 1970: Martin Page
- 1972: William McIlroy
- 1977: Jim Herrick
- 1979: Terry Mullins
- 1996: Keith Porteous Wood (executive director)
- 2017: Stephen Evans (chief executive officer)

== See also ==
- National Federation of Atheist, Humanist and Secular Student Societies
- Humanists UK
- Conway Hall Ethical Society
- Humanists International
- Rationalist Association

== Bibliography ==
- Cohen, Chapman (1940). Almost an Autobiography: confessions of a freethinker. London: Pioneer Press.
- Royle, Edward (1974). Victorian Infidels: the origins of the British Secularist Movement, 1791–1866. Manchester: Manchester University Press. ISBN 0719005574 Online version
- Royle, Edward (1980). Radicals, Secularists and Republicans: popular freethought in Britain, 1866–1915. Manchester: Manchester University Press. ISBN 0719007836
- Smoker, Barbara (2002). Freethoughts: atheism, secularism, humanism – Selected Egotistically from "The Freethinker. (Selections of contributions to The Freethinker). London: G.W. Foote & Co. ISBN 0950824356.
- Tribe, David (1967). 100 Years of Freethought. London: Elek Books.
- Tribe, David (1971). President Charles Bradlaugh, MP. London: Elek Books. ISBN 0236177265
