= Barbara Smoker =

British humanist (1923–2020)

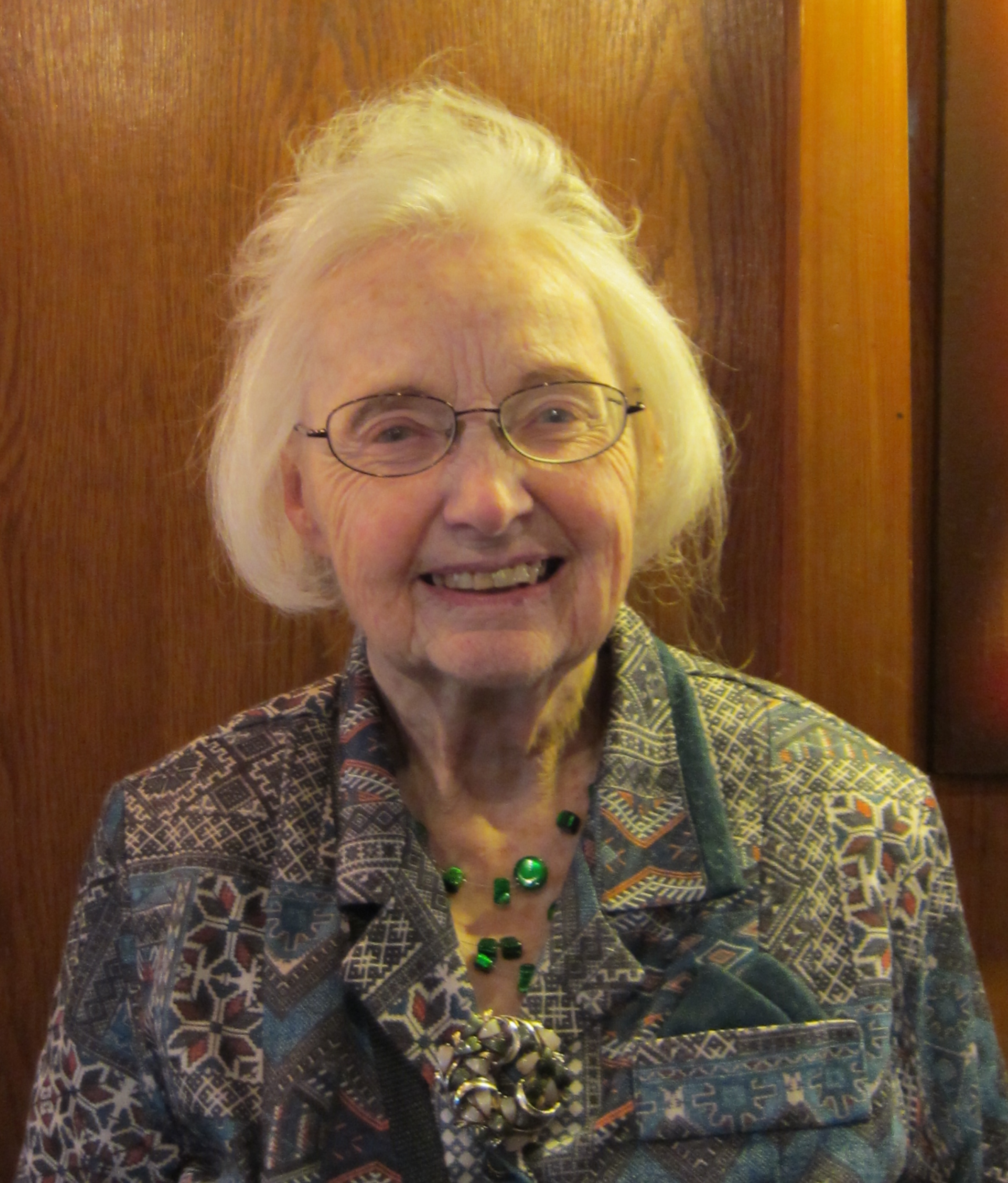
- In Bloomsbury in 2017
- Born: 2 June 1923; Catford, London, England, UK
- Died: 7 April 2020 (aged 96); Lewisham, London, England, UK

Philosophical work
- Institutions: National Secular Society; Humanists UK; South Place Ethical Society; Voluntary Euthanasia Society; Women's Royal Naval Service
- Main interests: Humanism

Barbara Mary Smoker (2 June 1923 – 7 April 2020) was a British humanist activist and freethought advocate. She was also President of the National Secular Society (1972–1996), Chair of the British Voluntary Euthanasia Society (now known as Dignity in Dying) (1981–1985) and an Honorary Vice President of the Gay and Lesbian Humanist Association in the United Kingdom.

== Biography ==
Barbara Smoker was born in Catford, London in 1923 into a Roman Catholic family. She served in the Women's Royal Naval Service from 1942 to 1945 in southeast Asia. In 1949 she became an atheist, inspired by the writing of Hector Hawton, managing director of the Rationalist Press Association and editor of The Humanist.

In 1950 Smoker joined the humanist movement when she became a member of the South Place Ethical Society, and the West London Ethical Society. As a volunteer with the Ethical Union (later known as the British Humanist Association and as Humanists UK), she became a close friend of Harold Blackham and worked with him to organise the first World Humanist Congress in London, in 1952, to follow the conference in Amsterdam where Humanists International had been founded. In this time she also worked closely with Ashton Bural, who ran the Progressive League, a humanist campaigning organisation that worked closely with the Ethical Union. She became a popular humanist celebrant at non-religious funerals, wedding ceremonies, gay and lesbian commitments, and baby-namings, as well as a trainer of celebrants for the British Humanist Association. She also wrote the popular children's textbook Humanism, which saw widespread use in schools.

Her longest stint in her career as an activist was her tenure as President of the National Secular Society, spanning nearly 25 years (1972 –1996). In that capacity, she represented atheist and secularist viewpoints in print, on lecture platforms, speaking tours, on radio and television. As well as leading the NSS, she was also active in various social campaigns, such as the abolition of the death penalty, prison reform, nuclear disarmament, legalisation of abortion and for the Voluntary Euthanasia Society; she served as chair of the latter organisation from 1981 to 1985. She claimed to have financed the manufacture of the first Make Love, Not War badges that were popular in Britain during the 1960s.

Barbara Smoker became the South Place Ethical Society's last and only female Appointed Lecturer in 1986. As of May 2014, with the death of Dr Harry Stopes-Roe, she became the only living Appointed Lecturer. In 2005 Barbara Smoker received the Distinguished Humanist Service Award from Humanists International. She was also awarded Honorary Member of Humanists UK (formerly the British Humanist Association) at some stage in recognition of her activism. Smoker lived in southeast London and in 2012 was elected the Honorary life president of the South East London Humanist Group in recognition that she was its last surviving founder member.

She died in Lewisham Hospital on 7 April 2020, aged 96, from cancer /.

== Publications ==
- Good God! a string of verses to tie up the deity (1977) B & T, London, ISBN 0-905934-01-6
- Atheism on a Soap-Box (1985). London: National Secular Society.
- Humanism (2017, 7th edition), Barbara Smoker. G. W. Foote & Co. Ltd. ISBN 978-1-911578-04-8 (an introduction to Humanism for secondary education)
- Blackham's Best (2007, 3rd edition), edited by Barbara Smoker. Published by British Humanist Association. ISBN 978-0-901825-84-1 (Excerpts from the work of Harold John Blackham).
- Freethoughts (2002), Barbara Smoker. G.W. Foote & Co. ISBN 0-9508243-5-6. (Selections of contributions to The Freethinker).
- My Godforsaken Life - Memoir of a Maverick (2018) Thornwick Press ISBN 978-1-912664-02-3 (autobiography)

Editor:

- The Future of our Past: from Ancient Greece to Global Village, by Harold Blackham (1996). Prometheus Books. ISBN 1-57392-042-8

Contributor:

- ROBINSON, PATRICIA (10 September 2014). "Street lighting is too bright in Lewisham". News Shopper.
- Read, Carly (19 August 2014). "Elderly woman suffers sleepless nights as Lewisham Council changes lamppost light which beams through bedroom". News Shopper.
- "Birthday salute to veteran secular campaigner Barbara Smoker". Camden New Journal. 6 June 2013. Archived from the original on 19 November 2016.
- Smoker, Barbara (18 May 2016). "Letters to the editor: Vote Leave to beat the bureaucrats". Evening Standard.

== See also ==
- Humanists UK
- National Secular Society
