= Jim Herrick =

British activist (1944–2023)

Jim Herrick (August 1944 – 20 June 2023) was a British humanist and secularist. He studied history and English literature at Trinity College, Cambridge University, and then worked as a school teacher for seven years. He wrote or edited several books on humanism and the history of freethought.

== Biography ==
Herrick was a trustee of the Rationalist Association and was editor of its journal New Humanist for 18 years from 1984. He subsequently became literary editor of New Humanist until his retirement in 2005. He was the recipient of the second International Rationalist Award by Rationalist International in 2002.

He was editor of International Humanist News, published by the International Humanist and Ethical Union (IHEU). In 1996 he received the Distinguished Humanist Service Award from the IHEU. He was a signatory to Humanist Manifesto III.

From January 1977 until 1981, Herrick edited The Freethinker. He later wrote that publication's centenary history. He was a founder member of the Gay and Lesbian Humanist Association.

Herrick stepped down as a vice-president of the National Secular Society at the 2007 AGM but remained on the Council of Management until stepping down at the 2009 AGM.

== Publications ==
- Aspiring to the Truth: Two Hundred Years of the South Place Ethical Society. (2016). With an introduction by Nicolas Walter. Published by CreateSpace Independent Publishing Platform. ISBN 1-5329793-7-1.
- Humanism: An Introduction. (2003). ISBN 0-301-00301-7. (Also published by Prometheus Books, 2005. ISBN 1-59102-239-8)
- Humanist Anthology: From Confucius to David Attenborough. (1995). London, Rationalist Press Association. Edited by Margaret Knight; 2nd edition, revised by Jim Herrick. ISBN 0-301-94001-0
- Against the Faith: Some Deists, Skeptics and Atheists. (1985). London: Glover & Blair. ISBN 0-906681-09-X (Also published by Prometheus Books, 1994. ISBN 0-87975-288-2).
- Vision and Realism: A Hundred Years of The Freethinker. (1982). London: GW Foote & Co. ISBN 0-9508243-0-5
- Selected articles for New Humanist on the newhumanist.org.uk website.
