= The Freethinker (journal) =

Skeptic journal

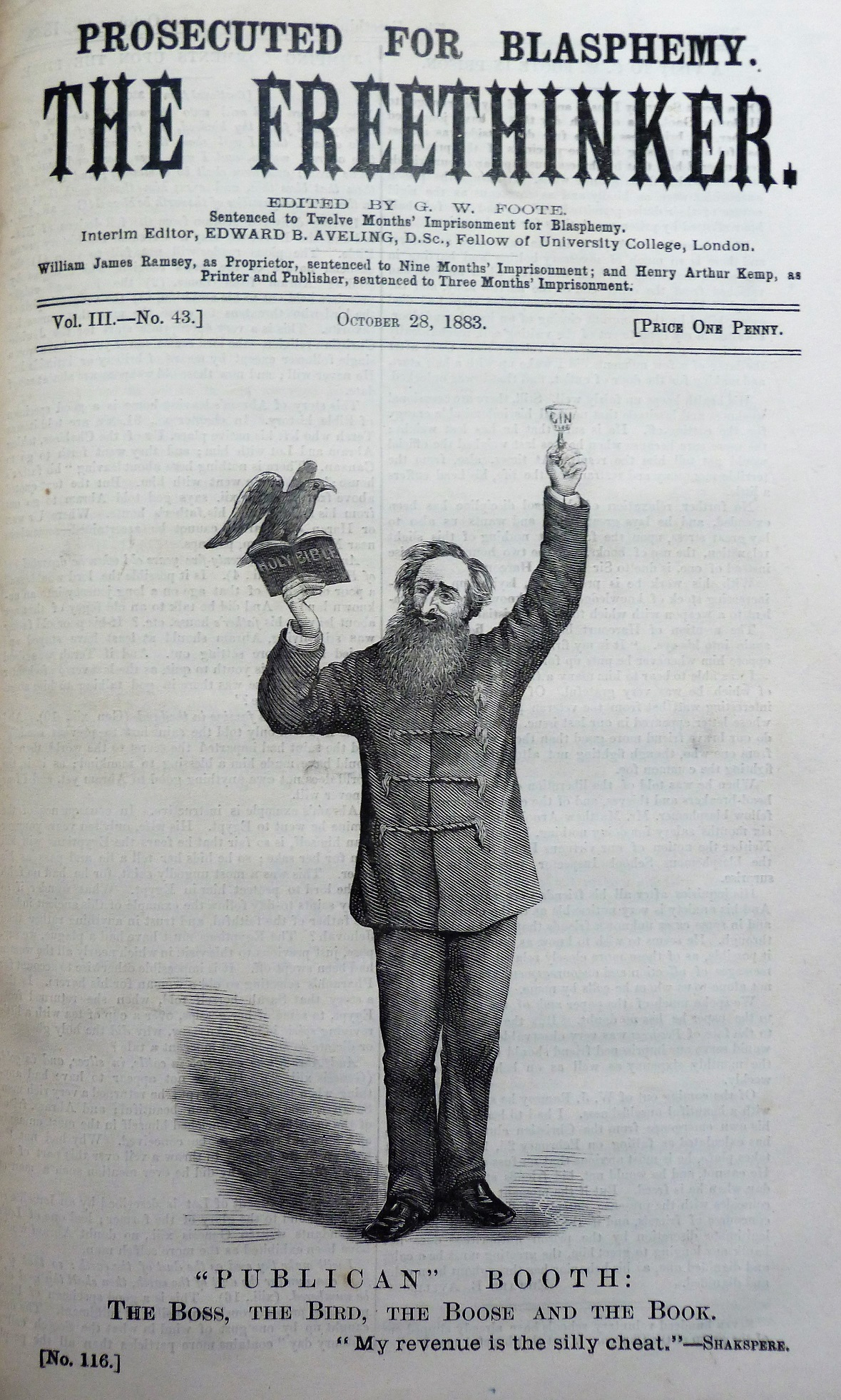
- Cover of Volume III, Number 43 from October 1883
- Categories: Science magazine
- Frequency: Monthly
- First issue: 1 May 1881
- Final issue: April 2014 (print)
- Country: United Kingdom
- Language: English
- Website: freethinker.co.uk

The Freethinker is a British secular humanist periodical founded by G. W. Foote in 1881. One of the world's oldest surviving freethought publications, it moved online-only in 2014.

It has always taken an unapologetically atheist, anti-religious stance. In Issue 1 (May, 1881), Foote set out The Freethinker's purpose:

The Freethinker is an anti-Christian organ, and must therefore be chiefly aggressive. It will wage relentless war against superstition in general, and against Christian superstition in particular. It will do its best to employ the resources of Science, Scholarship, Philosophy and Ethics against the claims of the Bible as a Divine Revelation; and it will not scruple to employ for the same purpose any weapons of ridicule or sarcasm that may be borrowed from the armoury of Common Sense.

Although closely linked with the National Secular Society for most of its history (NSS Presidents and General Secretaries have at various times also served as Freethinker editor), The Freethinker is strictly autonomous and is not, and never has been, published by the NSS; it has been published by G. W. Foote & Co. Ltd. since its inception.

In 2006, the magazine's front-page masthead was changed from "Secular humanist monthly" to "The Voice of Atheism since 1881".

Daniel James Sharp is the current editor, succeeding Emma Park from April 2024.

== History ==
Following the publication of anti-religious cartoons in the Christmas 1882 edition of The Freethinker, Foote was prosecuted for blasphemy, and sentenced to 12 months imprisonment with hard labour. On receiving his sentence from Mr Justice North (a devout Catholic), Foote said "with great deliberation" to the Judge "My Lord, I thank you; it is worthy of your creed". His description of this experience was published in 1886 as Prisoner for Blasphemy.

The April 2014 edition of The Freethinker contained an announcement that the May issue would be the last to appear in print; publication would continue online. The Freethinker kept its own website until all new content was moved to a section of the Patheos website, the first article appearing on 16 July 2021.

The Freethinker bulletin of 22 January 2022 announced that Barry Duke was moving to the newly established OnlySky website. His successor, Emma Park, was announced on The Freethinker website on 27 January 2022. In June 2022 Barry Duke explained that although The Freethinker was due to move from the Patheos website to OnlySky, the board of G. W. Foote & Co. Ltd. decided to keep its own dedicated website and to terminate his editorship. He was succeeded by Emma Park.

On 1 April 2024, a bulletin from The Freethinker announced that Daniel James Sharp had succeeded Emma Park as editor from this date.

== List of Freethinker editors ==
- George William Foote, May 1881 – October 1915 (Edward Aveling edited the paper during Foote's imprisonment, 1883)
- Chapman Cohen, October 1915 – June 1951
- Frank Ridley, June 1951 – April 1954
- A Committee consisting of F. A. Hornibrook, Bayard Simmons, G. H. Taylor May 1954 – August 1959.
- Colin McCall replaced Simmons in 1957, his name appearing alongside Hornibrook and Taylor from December that year. He became sole editor from August 1959 until December 1965
- David Tribe, January 1966 – May 1966
- Kit Mouat, June 1966 – January 1967
- David Collis, January 1967 – October 1967
- Karl Hyde, November 1967 – August 1968
- David Reynolds, September 1968 – July 1970
- William McIlroy, August 1970 – December 1971
- Nigel Sinnott, January 1972 – September 1973
- Christopher Morey, October 1973 – December 1974
- William McIlroy, January 1975 – December 1976
- Jim Herrick, January 1977 – August 1981
- William McIlroy, September 1981 – December 1992
- Peter Brearey, January 1993 – May 1998
- Barry Duke, June 1998 – January 2022
- Dr Emma Park, January 2022 – March 2024
- Daniel James Sharp, April 2024 –

== Bibliography ==
- Cohen, Chapman (1940). Almost an Autobiography: Confessions of a Freethinker. London: Pioneer Press.
- Herrick, Jim (1982). Vision and Realism: A Hundred Years of The Freethinker. London: GW Foote & Co. ISBN 0950824305.
- Marsh, Joss (1998). Word Crimes: Blasphemy, Culture, and Literature in Nineteenth-Century England. Chicago: University of Chicago Press. ISBN 0226506916.
- Smoker, Barbara (2002). Freethoughts: Atheism, Secularism, Humanism – Selected Egotistically from 'The Freethinker'. London: GW Foote & Co. ISBN 0950824356.
