= Thinker's Library =

Book series

The Thinker's Library was a series of 140 hardcover books published between 1929 and 1951 for the Rationalist Press Association by Watts & Co., London, a company founded by the brothers John and Charles Watts and then run by the latter's son Charles Albert Watts. The name was suggested by Archibald Robertson, a member of the company's board of directors, who took an active interest in setting up the series and was later to write several volumes himself. The Thinker’s Library was intended as a successor to the cheap paperback “Sixpenny Reprints” from the same publisher, the aim being to bring humanist, philosophical and scientific works to as wide an audience as possible. Unlike the previous series, the volumes in the Thinker’s Library were small hardbacks (6 ½ x 4 ¼ inches) bound in brown clothette, with grey dustjackets, priced at one shilling. The covers of the early editions featured title, author’s name and a brief description of the book between Doric columns, with the image of Rodin’s The Thinker at the foot. The design would change several times over the course of the series, but the figure of the Thinker remained ever-present.

The library covered a wide range of subjects with a broadly humanist slant. The lists of titles occasionally published in individual volumes were arranged under these headings: General Philosophy, Psychology, Anthropology, General Science, Religion, History, Fiction and Miscellaneous. The last group included collections of essays by several writers, drama (a volume containing two plays by Euripides), poetry (James Thomson’s The City of Dreadful Night) and memoirs (the Autobiography of Charles Darwin). The focus was initially on reprints, often abridgements of, or selections from, longer works from well-known free-thinking writers; Darwin, J. S. Mill, H. G. Wells and Herbert Spencer were among those represented in the first ten volumes. However, as the series continued it focused more and more on original titles. The first of these to be published in the series was A. E. Mander’s Psychology for Everyman (And Woman) in 1935; reprinted several times, it was to sell over 400,000 copies, and was followed by the same author’s Clearer Thinking: Logic for Everyman the following year. Further original titles were contributed by J. A. C. Brown, Adam Gowans Whyte, Sir Arthur Smith Woodward and George Godwin, among others, and it was Godwin's The Great Revivalists that brought the series to a close in 1951.

== List of titles ==
Dates given are of first publication in the Thinker's Library. Abridgements of longer works are indicated by an asterisk.

1. First and Last Things: A Confession of Faith and Rule of Life by H. G. Wells (1929)
2. Education: Intellectual, Moral, and Physical by Herbert Spencer (1929)
3. The Riddle of the Universe by Ernst Haeckel. Translated by Joseph McCabe (1929)
4. Humanity's Gain from Unbelief, and Other Selections from the Works of Charles Bradlaugh. With prefatory note by Hypatia Bradlaugh Bonner (1929)
5. On Liberty by John Stuart Mill (1929)
6. A Short History of the World by H. G. Wells (1929)
7. The Autobiography of Charles Darwin. With two appendices by his son Sir Francis Darwin (1929)
8. The Origin of Species by Charles Darwin. Last (sixth) edition (1929)
9. Twelve Years in a Monastery by Joseph McCabe. Third and revised edition (1929)
10. History of Modern Philosophy by A. W. Benn (1930)
11. Gibbon on Christianity: being the 15th and 16th chapters of Edward Gibbon's Decline and Fall of the Roman Empire. With an introduction by J. M. Robertson (1930)
12. The Descent of Man by Charles Darwin. Part 1 and the concluding chapter of Part 3, with a preface by Major Leonard Darwin (1930)
13. History of Civilization in England (Vol. I) by Henry Thomas Buckle (1930)*
14. Anthropology (Vol. I) by Sir Edward B. Tylor. With an introduction by A. C. Haddon (1930)
15. Anthropology (Vol. II) by Sir Edward B. Tylor (1930)
16. Iphigenia: Two plays by Euripides. Translated by C. B. Bonner. Contains the plays Iphigenia in Aulis and Iphigenia in Tauris (1930)
17. Lectures and Essays by Thomas Henry Huxley (1931)
18. The Evolution of the Idea of God by Grant Allen (1931)*
19. An Agnostic's Apology, and Other Essays by Sir Leslie Stephen (1931)
20. The Churches and Modern Thought: An Inquiry into the Grounds of Unbelief and an Appeal for Candour by Vivian Phelips [Philip Vivian] (1931)
21. Penguin Island by Anatole France. Translated by A. W. Evans (1931)
22. The Pathetic Fallacy: A Study of Christianity by Llewelyn Powys (1931)
23. Historical Trials: A Selection by Sir John MacDonell, K. C. B. Edited by R. Lee, with a preface by Lord Shaw of Dunfermline (1931)*
24. A Short History of Christianity by J. M. Robertson (1931)
25. The Martyrdom of Man by Winwood Reade (1931)
26. Head-hunters: Black, White, and Brown by A. C. Haddon (1932)*
27. The Evidence for the Supernatural: A Critical Study made with 'Uncommon Sense' by Ivor Ll. Tuckett (1932)*
28. The City of Dreadful Night and Other Poems: A selection from the Poetical Works of James Thomson (B.V.). With a preface by Henry S. Salt (1932)
29. In the Beginning: The Origin of Civilisation by G. Elliot Smith (1932)
30. Adonis: a Study in the History of Oriental Religion by Sir James G. Frazer. From Part IV of The Golden Bough (1932)*
31. Our New Religion by H. A. L. Fisher (1933)
32. On Compromise by John Morley (1933)
33. A History of the Taxes on Knowledge: Their Origin and Repeal by Collet Dobson Collet. Introduction by George Jacob Holyoake (1933)*
34. The Existence of God by Joseph McCabe (1933)
35. The Story of the Bible by MacLeod Yearsley (1933)*
36. Savage Survivals: The Story of the Race Told in Simple Language by J. Howard Moore (1933)
37. The Revolt of the Angels by Anatole France. Translated by Mrs Wilfrid Jackson (1933)
38. The Outcast by Winwood Reade (1933)
39. Penalties Upon Opinion: or Some Records of the laws of Heresy and Blasphemy by Hypatia Bradlaugh Bonner. Revised and enlarged by F. W. Read (1934)
40. Oath, Curse, and Blessing: and other Studies in Origins by Ernest Crawley. Edited by Theodore Besterman (1934)
41. Fireside Science by Sir E. Ray Lankester. Selected and prepared by C. M. Beadnell (1934)
42. History of Anthropology by A. C. Haddon (1934)
43. The World's Earliest Laws by Chilperic Edwards (1934)
44. Fact and Faith by J. B. S. Haldane (1934)
45. Men of the Dawn: The Story of Man’s Evolution to the End of the Old Stone Age by Dorothy Davison (1934)
46. The Mind in the Making by James Harvey Robinson. With an introduction by H. G. Wells (1934)
47. The Expression of the Emotions in Man and Animals by Charles Darwin. Revised and abridged by C. M. Beadnell (1934)*
48. Psychology for Everyman (and Woman) by A. E. Mander (1935)
49. The Religion of the Open Mind by Adam Gowans Whyte. Foreword by Eden Philpotts (1935)
50. Letters on Reasoning by J. M. Robertson (1935)*
51. The Social Record of Christianity by Joseph McCabe (1935)
52. Five Stages of Greek Religion: Studies Based on a Course of Lectures Delivered in April 1912 at Columbia University by Gilbert Murray (1935)
53. The Life of Jesus by Ernest Renan (1935)
54. Selected Works of Voltaire. Translated with an introduction by Joseph McCabe (1935)
55. What are we to do with our lives? by H. G. Wells (1935)
56. Do What You Will: Essays by Aldous Huxley (1936)
57. Clearer Thinking (Logic for Everyman) by A. E. Mander (1936)
58. History of Ancient Philosophy by A. W. Benn (1936)
59. Your Body: How it is Built and How it Works by D. Stark Murray (1936)
60. What is Man? by Mark Twain. With an introduction by S. K. Ratcliffe (1936)
61. Man and His Universe by John Langdon-Davies (1937)
62. First Principles by Herbert Spencer. Sixth and final edition, with an introduction by T. W. Hill (1937)
63. Rights of Man: Being an Answer to Mr Burke’s Attack on the French Revolution by Thomas Paine. Edited by Hypatia Bradlaugh Bonner, with an introduction by G.D.H. Cole (1937)
64. This Human Nature: A History, A Commentary, An Exposition by Charles Duff (1937)*
65. Dictionary of Scientific Terms as Used in the Various Sciences by C. M. Beadnell (1938)
66. A Book of Good Faith by Montaigne. Chosen and arranged by Gerald Bullett (1938)
67. The Universe of Science by H. Levy. Revised and expanded edition (1938)
68. Liberty To-day by C. E. M. Joad. Revised edition (1938)
69. The Age of Reason by Thomas Paine (1938)
70. The Fair Haven by Samuel Butler. With an introduction by Gerald Bullett (1938)
71. A Candidate for Truth: Passages from Emerson. Chosen and arranged by Gerald Bullett (1938)
72. A Short History of Women by John Langdon-Davies (1938)*
73. Natural Causes and Supernatural Seemings by Henry Maudsley (1939)*
74. Morals, Manners, and Men by Havelock Ellis (1939)
75. Pages from a Lawyer's Notebooks by E. S. P. Haynes (1939)
76. An Architect of Nature: The autobiography of Luther Burbank. With a biographical sketch by Wilbur Hall (1939)
77. Act of God by F. Tennyson Jesse (1940)
78. The Man versus The State by Herbert Spencer (1940)
79. The World as I See It by Albert Einstein. Translated by Alan Harris (1940)
80. Jocasta's Crime: An Anthropological Study by Lord Raglan (1940)
81. The Twilight of the Gods and Other Tales by Richard Garnett (1940)*
82. Kingship by A. M. Hocart (1941)*
83. Religion Without Revelation by Julian Huxley (1941)*
84. Let the People Think by Bertrand Russell (1941)
85. The Myth of the Mind by Frank Kenyon (1941)
86. The Liberty of Man and Other Essays by Robert G. Ingersoll (1941)
87. Man Makes Himself by V. Gordon Childe (1941)
88. World Revolution and the Future of the West by W. Friedmann (1942)
89. The Origin of the Kiss and Other Scientific Diversions by C. M. Beadnell (1942)
90. The Bible and its Background (Vol. I: The Old Testament and More Important Books of the Apocrypha) by Archibald Robertson (1942)
91. The Bible and its Background (Vol. II: The New Testament) by Archibald Robertson (1942)
92. The Conquest of Time by H. G. Wells. Written to replace his First and Last Things (1942)
93. The Gospel of Rationalism by Charles T. Gorham (1943)
94. Life's Unfolding by Sir Charles Sherrington (1943)
95. An Easy Outline of Astronomy by M. Davidson (1943)
96. The God of the Bible: A Searching Study of the Christian Creed by Evans Bell (1943). First published as “Task of To-day” (1852)
97. Man Studies Life: The Story of Biology by G. N. Ridley (1944)
98. In Search of the Real Bible by A. D. Howell Smith (1944)
99. The Outlines of Mythology by Lewis Spence (1944)
100. Magic and Religion: Being chapters I to VII of the abridged edition of The Golden Bough by Sir James G. Frazer. With foreword by Prof. G. M. Trevelyan (1944)*
101. Flight from Conflict by Laurence Collier (1944)
102. Progress and Archaeology by V. Gordon Childe (1944)
103. The Chemistry of Life: An Easy Outline of Biochemistry by J. S. D. Bacon (1944)
104. Medicine and Mankind by Arnold Sorsby (1944)*
105. The Church and Social Progress: An Exposition of Rationalism and Reaction by Marjorie Bowen (1945)
106. The Great Mystics by George Godwin (1945)
107. The Religion of Ancient Mexico by Lewis Spence (1945)
108. Geology in the Life of Man: A Brief History of its Influence on Thought and the Development of Modern Civilization by Duncan Leitch (1945)
109. A Century for Freedom: A Survey of the French "Philosophers" by Kenneth Urwin (1946)
110. Jesus: Myth or History? by Archibald Robertson (1946)
111. The Ethics of Belief and Other Essays by William Kingdon Clifford. Edited by Sir Leslie Stephen and Sir Frederick Pollock (1947)
112. Human Nature, War and Society by John Cohen. With a foreword by Lord Raglan (1946)
113. The Rational Good: A Study in the Logic of Practice by L. T. Hobhouse. With a foreword by Archibald Robertson (1947)
114. Man: The Verdict of Science by G. N. Ridley (1946)
115. The Distressed Mind by J. A. C. Brown (1946)
116. The Illusion of National Character by Hamilton Fyfe (1946)*
117. Population, Psychology, and Peace by J. C. Flugel. With an introduction by C. E. M. Joad (1947)
118. Friar's Lantern by G. G. Coulton (1948)
119. Ideals and Illusions by L. Susan Stebbing. With an introduction by Prof. A. E. Heath (1948)
120. An Outline of the Development of Science by Mansel Davies (1947)
121. Head and Hand in Ancient Greece: Four Studies in the Social Relations of Thought by Benjamin Farrington (1947)
122. The Evolution of Society by J. A. C. Brown (1947)
123. Background to Modern Thought by C. D. Hardie (1947)
124. The Holy Heretics: The Story of the Albigensian Crusade by Edmond Holmes (1947). First published as “The Albigensian or Catharist Heresy” (1925)
125. Man His Own Master by Archibald Robertson (1948)
126. Men Without Gods by Hector Hawton (1948)
127. The Earliest Englishman by Sir Arthur Smith Woodward. With a foreword by Sir Arthur Keith (1948)
128. Astronomy for Beginners by Martin Davidson (1948)
129. The Search for Health by D. Stark Murray (1948)
130. The Mystery of Anna Berger by George Godwin (1948)
131. Wrestling Jacob: A Study of the Life of John Wesley by Marjorie Bowen (1948)*
132. The Origins of Religion by Lord Raglan (1949)
133. The Hero: A Study in Tradition, Myth, and Drama by Lord Raglan (1949)
134. The Life of John Knox by Marjorie Bowen (1949)
135. The French Revolution by Archibald Robertson (1949)
136. The Art of Thought by Graham Wallas (1949)*
137. Literary Style and Music: Including Two Short Essays on Gracefulness and Beauty by Herbert Spencer (1950)
138. The Origin of Species by Charles Darwin. A Reprint of the First Edition. With a foreword by Dr C. D. Darlington, F. R. S. (1950)
139. The Science of Heredity by J. S. D. Bacon (1951)
140. The Great Revivalists by George Godwin (1951)

== Bibliography ==
- Cooke, Bill (2003). The Blasphemy Depot: A Hundred Years of the Rationalist Press Association. London: Rationalist Press Association. ISBN 0-301-00302-5. Republished as: The Gathering of Infidels: A Hundred Years of the Rationalist Press Association, Amherst, New York: Prometheus Press, 2006. ISBN 1-591-02196-0.
