= Watts & Co. (publishing firm) =

British publishing firm

Watts & Co. was a British publishing house which aimed to promote rationalism and secular education and "publish free thought books at affordable prices". The firm had a close relationship with the Rationalist Press Association (later known as the Rationalist Association) and many of books it published were imprinted "Issued for the Rationalist Press Association Limited".

== Company history ==
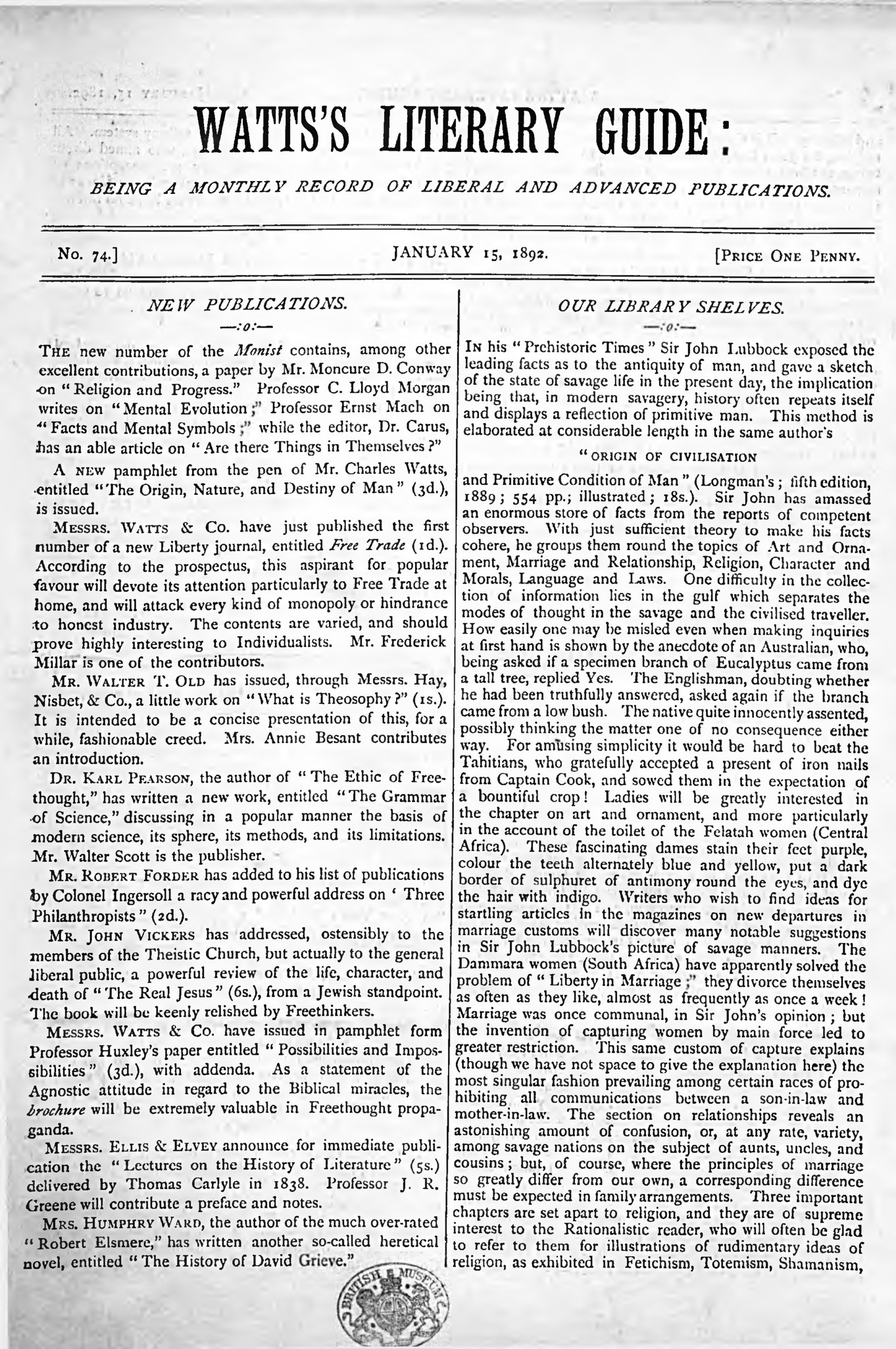
Watts's Literary Guide, Being a Monthly Record of Liberal and Advanced Publications, No. 74, 15 January 1892

Watts & Co. was founded in 1864 by the English secularist Charles Watts and his elder brother John Watts (1834–1866). In 1880 the firm's name, Watts & Co., was changed to C. Watts and in 1882 changed to C. A. Watts & Co., but it was still commonly referred to, including on the title pages of many of the published books, as Watts & Co. Its premises were initially located at 17 Johnson's Court (just off Fleet Street), London.

In the first ten years of its operation the firm competed with its main business rival, the secularist Charles Bradlaugh's Freethought Publishing Company, for market share. To do that it published the works of William Stewart Ross (who penned essays using his nom de plume, "Saladin"), who was a strong critic of Bradlaugh on certain aspects of doctrine and social policy.

When Charles Watts migrated to America in 1882 he handed over the publishing the firm to his son, Charles Watts Jr. (also referred to as C. A. Watts).

In 1885 the firm launched Watts's Literary Guide, a long-lasting periodical which changed its title three times: in 1884 to The Literary Guide and Rationalist Review, in 1956 to the Humanist and in 1972 to the New Humanist. Under the latest title it still being published in 2024.

After publishing Joseph McCabe's The Religion of the Twentieth Century in 1899 to modest acclaim, the firm had its first major success in 1900 with Ernst Haeckel's The Riddle of the Universe which had sold 100,000 copies by 1905. In 1902 the firm launched its Cheap Reprints series, which Watts viewed a vehicle to make great works of free thought and "rationalist thought available to people ... of modest means and limited leisure". Authors in this series included Charles Darwin, Thomas Huxley and John Stuart Mill. Each volume was sold for sixpence, a price shunned by mainstream publishers as inviting bankruptcy but which in fact ended up selling "in the region of 4,000,000 copies".

Watts & Co. launched the Thinker's Library series in 1929 under the editorship of Charles Watts Jr.'s son Fredrick. Running for 22 years, it comprised 140 titles as hardbacks bound in red cloth, with the selling price set in the beginning at no more than one shilling per volume. The series "sold several million copies of philosophical works over the years".

Over the years C. A. Watts & Company Limited maintained a strong link with the Rationalist Press Association. In 1953 the organizations agreed that "the publishing policy of CA Watts & Co would be decided by the Rationalist Press Association Board".

In 1960 Watts & Co. was sold to Sir Isaac Pitman and Sons. Henceforth the Pemberton Publishing Company, a subsidiary of the Rationalist Press Association, would handle "all the publishing affairs of the ... Association". The last Pemberton title was published in 1989 and from that time all titles were directly published by the Rationalist Press Association itself.

== Book series ==
- Changing World Library
- Conway Memorial Lecture
- The Forum Series
- The History of Science Series
- The Inquirer's Library
- Library of Science and Culture
- Life-Stories of Famous Men
- The New Thinker's Library
- Pamphlets for the Million
- The People's Platform
- R. P. A. Cheap Reprints
- R. P. A. Extra Series
- The Story of the Sciences
- The Thinker's Forum
- Thinker's Library
- Thrift Books
- The World of Youth Series
- The World of Youth Library

== Legacy ==
Watts & Co. successfully published modestly priced books on "rationalist and humanist" themes which were read by millions of people throughout the English-speaking world. This was done in the face of hostility from certain church leaders, booksellers, judges and politicians who objected to books which "challenged the traditional religious outlook" and in the face of skeptical mainstream publishers who believed that Watts' publishing program would lead to their bankruptcy.

Watts & Co. "provided a vehicle for unusual talents" such as Joseph McCabe, Hector Hawton and Nicolas Walter "to thrive".

The Rationalist Press Association/Watts & Co. partnership operated "one of the first book clubs" where "members of the association subscribing five shillings and upwards" and in return "received books to the value of their subscriptions".

Bill Cooke has argued that the Watts & Co. was "the first systematic venture to publish affordable non-fiction in paperback form", with its Cheap Reprints series appearing before the launch of Ernest Benn Limited's Sixpenny Library, J. M. Dent's Everyman's Library and Penguin's Pelican Books.
