= Francis Ratcliffe =

Australian zoologist and conservationist (1904–1970)

Francis Noble Ratcliffe OBE
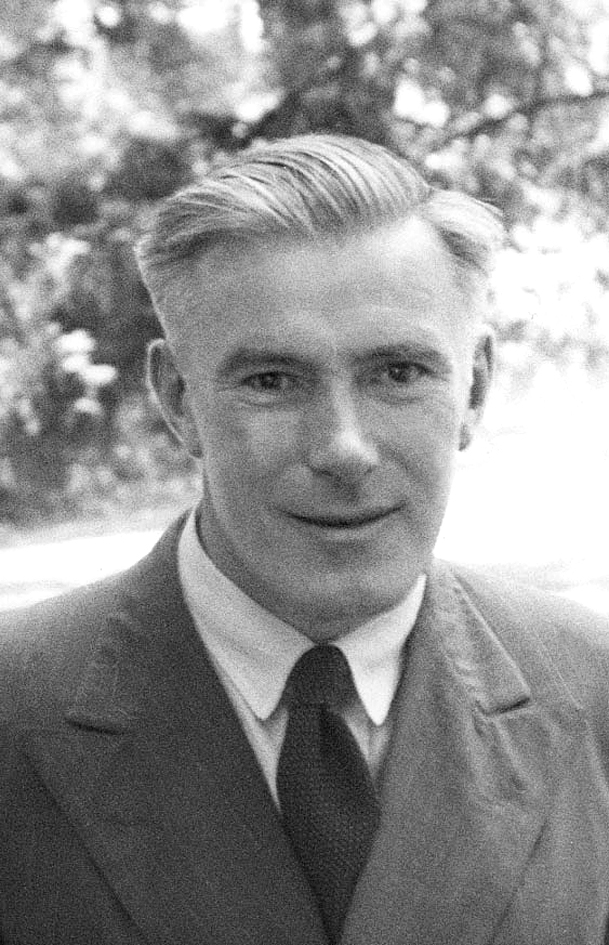
- Francis Ratcliffe
- Born: 11 January 1904; Calcutta, India
- Died: 8 December 1970 (aged 66); Canberra, Australia
- Education: Berkhamsted School
- Alma mater: University of Oxford; Princeton University
- Occupations: Zoologist; Conservationist
- Father: Samuel Kerkham Ratcliffe
- Relatives: Nicholas Walter (nephew); William Grey Walter (brother-in-law); Arnold Beck (brother-in-law)

Francis Noble Ratcliffe OBE (11 January 1904 – 8 December 1970) was an Australian zoologist and conservationist.

Ratcliffe was born a British citizen in Calcutta, India. He was educated at Berkhamsted School and the University of Oxford in the United Kingdom, and at Princeton University in the USA. After a short period working in London with the Empire Marketing Board, in 1929 he was brought to Australia by the CSIR to study flying foxes in northern New South Wales and Queensland, afterwards returning to Britain to work in the zoology department at the University of Aberdeen. However, he returned to Australia permanently in 1935, working with the CSIR, and its successor the CSIRO, on such problems as wind erosion, termites and rabbit control. He was also a founder of the Australian Conservation Foundation, serving as its first Honorary Secretary.

Ratcliffe retired from the CSIRO in 1969. He died in Canberra the following year of a cerebral haemorrhage.

== Bibliography ==
As well as various scientific papers and reports, books authored by Ratcliffe include:

- 1938 – Flying Fox and Drifting Sand: the Adventures of a Biologist in Australia. Angus and Robertson: Sydney.
- 1951 – The Rabbit Problem: a Survey of Research Needs and Possibilities. CSIRO: Melbourne.
- 1952 – Australian termites: The biology, recognition, and economic importance of the common species. CSIRO: Melbourne.

1965 (with Frank Fenner) Myxmatosis, Cambridge University Press.

1970 – The Commercial Hunting of Kangaroos. Australian Conservation Foundation: Melbourne.
