= Eleanor K. Baum =

American electrical engineer

- Born: New York City, U.S.
- Education: City College of New York (BS, 1958); Polytechnic Institute of New York (MS, PhD, 1964)
- Known for: First female engineering dean in the U.S. Advancing women and minorities in engineering
- Title: Dean Emerita, Albert Nerken School of Engineering
- Awards: National Women's Hall of Fame (2007); WITI Hall of Fame (1996); SWE Upward Mobility Award (1990); Emily Warren Roebling Award (1988)
- Scientific career
- Fields: Electrical engineering, Engineering education
- Workplaces: Pratt Institute; Cooper Union

Eleanor K. Baum (born 1940) is an American electrical engineer and educator. In 1984, she became the first female dean of an engineering school in the United States, at Pratt Institute in Brooklyn, New York.

Now retired, in 1987 she was made dean of the Albert Nerken School of Engineering at Cooper Union. She was also the first woman president of the American Society for Engineering Education (ASEE), and has served as president of the Accreditation Board for Engineering and Technology (ABET). She is a former chair of the New York Academy of Sciences.

== Early life and family ==
She was born in 1940, an only child. Her parents left Europe during the Holocaust and moved to the United States where they urged her to become an elementary schoolteacher, or, as a secondary option, a high school math teacher. As she was growing up, her parents would hide articles with themes of "the joys of being a schoolteacher" under her pillow. Baum considered herself "one of [the] really good kids," who did what they were told. She has stated that because she was an only child, all of her parents’ hopes and dreams were centered on her, so she felt obligated to behave.

According to Baum, engineering was her "big rebellion". When she told her mother about her career choice, her mother said, "You can’t do that. People will think you’re weird, and no one will marry you."

== Education ==
She attended Midwood High School in Brooklyn, New York where she excelled in advanced science and mathematics classes. Although there were a few other girls in her advanced chemistry classes, Baum was the only girl in her advanced physics and advanced mathematics classes. Engineering was dominated by men which, in addition to her adolescent rebellion, influenced her to choose it.

Baum was met with resistance upon applying to engineering colleges: Her high school teachers were discouraging and balked in a similar way that her mother did. One of the engineering schools she applied to would not admit her because it did not have a sufficient ladies' room.

After initial resistance, she was finally accepted to City College of New York. She graduated in 1958 as the only woman in her engineering class. Baum said, "Being the only girl in college classes was not wonderful... you become all women. If I don’t know something, then it’s 'all women can’t'..." Privacy was also an issue; fellow students were particularly interested in her grades. In 1964, she earned her Ph.D from Polytechnic Institute of New York (now New York University Tandon School of Engineering).

== Career ==
After graduating from City College of New York, she worked at the Sperry Rand Corporation and General Instrument Corporation, both of the aerospace industry. Baum maintained ties to industry through consulting.

In 1984, Baum became the dean of Pratt Institute's school of engineering in New York, a distinctive role because it made her the first woman dean of an engineering school in the United States. Three years later, she became dean of the Albert Nerken School of Engineering at Cooper Union.

During her tenure at Cooper Union, she is credited with increasing female enrollment in the engineering program from roughly 5% to nearly 40%.

== Societies ==
Baum is a fellow of the Accreditation Board for Engineering and Technology (ABET), the Institute of Electrical and Electronics Engineers (IEEE), the Society of Women Engineers (SWE), and the American Society for Engineering Education (ASEE). She was the first woman to serve as president of the ASEE. She has served as president of ABET and sat on the National Science Foundation's Engineering Advisory Board. She was involved with the Engineering Manpower Commission.

== Awards ==
In 1988, the National Women's Hall of Fame presented Baum with the Emily Warren Roebling Award. In 1990, the Society of Women Engineers awarded her the SWE Upward Mobility Award. In 1996, Baum was inducted into the Women in Technology International Hall of Fame. In 2007, she was inducted into the National Women's Hall of Fame. She is a Dean Emeritus at Cooper Union.

She holds honorary doctorates from several prestigious institutions, including the University of Notre Dame, Union College, and the Colorado School of Mines.

== Personal life ==
She is married to physicist Paul Baum and has two daughters.

== See also ==
- Sukumar Brahma
- Johan H. Enslin
