= Wiren Becker =

American electrical engineer

Wiren Dale Becker, who works for IBM, was named a Fellow of the Institute of Electrical and Electronics Engineers (IEEE) in 2015 for contributions to electric power distribution and signal integrity in high-speed interconnects for computing systems.

== See also ==
- Sukumar Brahma
- Johan H. Enslin
