= Mohammad Shahidehpour =

Iranian electrical engineer and academic

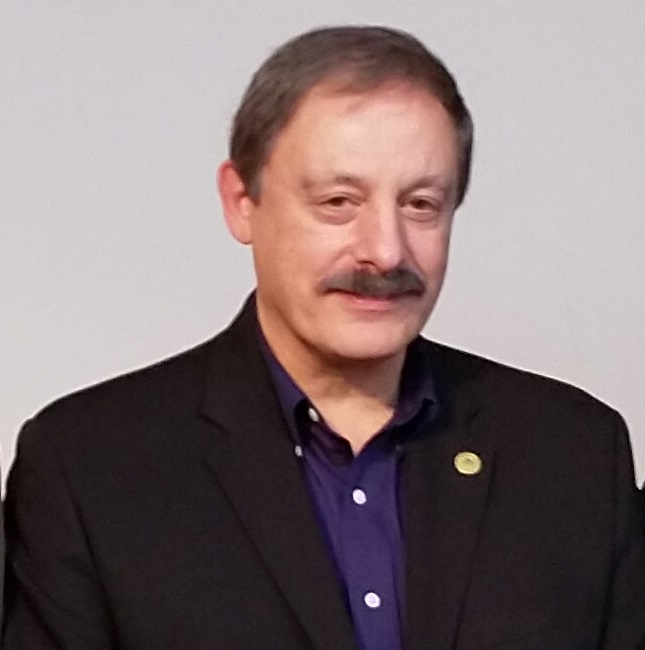
- Prof. Mohammad Shahidehpour at SGC2018
- Born: July 27, 1955 (age 70); Tehran, Imperial State of Iran
- Occupation: Professor
- Years active: 1981–
- Known for: Carl Bodine Distinguished Professor

Dr. Mohammad Shahidehpour is a prominent figure in the field of electrical engineering, currently serving as the Carl Bodine Distinguished Professor and Chairman of the Electrical and Computer Engineering Department at Illinois Institute of Technology (IIT). With over 300 technical papers and five books to his name, Shahidehpour has made significant contributions to electric power systems planning, operation, and control. His research has been instrumental in advancing the understanding of electricity restructuring and the integration of renewable energy sources into the power grid, making him a globally recognized expert in his field.

Shahidehpour has held various leadership positions, including serving as President of the National Electrical Engineering Honor Society (Eta Kappa Nu) and on its executive board for eight years. He has had a long association with IEEE, having served as Editor of the IEEE Transactions on Power Systems for fifteen years and currently holding the roles of Vice President of Publication for IEEE/PES and Editor-in-Chief of the IEEE Transactions on Smart Grid. As an IEEE Distinguished Lecturer, he has shared his expertise on electricity restructuring issues around the world. In recognition of his outstanding contributions, he was elected a member of the National Academy of Engineering in 2016. His accolades also include several prestigious awards, such as the IEEE/PES T. Burke Hayes Faculty Recognition Award and the Edison Electric Institute's Outstanding Faculty Award, further cementing his reputation as a leading authority in electrical engineering.

== Career ==
Shahidehpour was the president of National Electrical Engineering Honor Society (Eta Kappa Nu) and served on its executive board for eight years. He was Editor of the IEEE Transactions on Power Systems for fifteen years, and is currently the Vice President of Publication for IEEE/PES and also Editor in Chief of the IEEE Transactions on Smart Grid. He is a member of the editorial board of KIEE Journal of Power Engineering (Korea), International Journal of Emerging Electric Power Systems, IEEE Power and Energy Magazine, and International Journal of Electric Power Systems Research. Shahidehpour is an IEEE Distinguished Lecturer and has lectured across the globe on electricity restructuring issues. He is also an Honorary Professor at North China Electric Power University in China and Sharif University of Technology in Iran. He is a Fellow of IEEE. He was also elected a member of the National Academy of Engineering in 2016 for contributions to the optimal scheduling of generation in a deregulated electricity market with variable renewable energy sources.

== Awards ==
Shahidehpour is the recipient of:

- 2007 IEEE/PES T. Burke Hayes Faculty Recognition Award in Electric Power Engineering
- 2005 IEEE/PES Best Transactions Paper Award
- 2004 IEEE/PSO Best Transactions Paper Award
- Edison Electric Institute's Outstanding Faculty Award
- ΗΚΝ’s Outstanding Young Electrical Engineering Award
- Sigma Xi’s Outstanding Researcher Award
- IIT's Outstanding Faculty Award
- University of Michigan’s Outstanding Teaching Award

== Education ==
- Ph.D. Electrical Engineering Department, University of Missouri, Columbia, 1981
- M.S. Electrical Engineering Department, University of Missouri, Columbia, 1978
- B.S. Electrical Engineering Department, Sharif University of Technology, Iran, 1977

== See also ==
- Sukumar Brahma
- Johan H. Enslin
- Hassan Bevrani
