= A. W. Benn =

Rationalist Press Association honorary associate (1843–1915)

Alfred William Benn (1843–1915) was an agnostic and an honorary associate of the Rationalist Press Association. His book A History of Modern Philosophy (first published in 1912) was republished in the Thinker's Library series in 1930.

He was the author of The Greek Philosophers (2 vols, 1882); The History of English Rationalism in the Nineteenth Century (2 vols, 1906); and The History of Ancient and Modern Philosophy (2 vols, 1912).

Benn was also a member of the London Positivist Society and a friend of the lawyer and positivist Vernon Lushington. Lushington's daughter Susan recorded in her diary on 3 September 1889 that Benn and his wife visited the Lushington's Surrey home - Pyports, Cobham - and how Mrs Benn told her "how she came to be a positivist."
