= Archibald Robertson (atheist) =

English writer (1888–1961)

- Born: Archibald Horace Mann Robertson; 1886; Durham, England
- Died: 14 October 1961 (aged 74–75); Oxford, England
- Other name: "Harold" (disputed)
- Citizenship: United Kingdom
- Education: Winchester College. Trinity College, Oxford
- Organization: Rationalist Association
- Known for: Communism, atheism, anti-fascism
- Notable work: Philosophers on Holiday
- Political party: Communist Party of Great Britain (CPGB)
- Spouse: Sylvia

Archibald Horace Mann Robertson (Note: Some sources erroneously give his second name as "Harold") (1886 – 14 October 1961) was an English civil servant who became a writer on history, and social affairs from a left-wing perspective and critiques of Christianity.

== Early years ==
Robertson was born in Durham in 1886, eldest of the three sons of the similarly named Archibald Robertson and his wife Julia, née Mann. The father was an Anglican clergyman and the master of Hatfield College, Durham, who later became Principal of King's College, London and then Bishop of Exeter.

In 1899 Robertson won a scholarship to Winchester College, where it was that he began to doubt the Christian and Tory orthodoxies which were expected of him. This process started with his reading of the history of the French Revolution. Further spurs to his thinking came from Shelley's Queen Mab with its "devastating notes", J. W. Draper's History of the Conflict between Religion and Science and, most of all, Belfort Bax's The Ethics of Socialism.

From school he won a scholarship to Trinity College, Oxford, where he was in due course awarded a first-class degree in Greats. Meanwhile, he continued his political interest. The 1906 General Election, a landslide victory for the Liberals and the first substantial representation for the Labour Party, took place shortly after he started at Oxford. He avidly read left-wing periodicals such as The Clarion, Labour Leader, The New Age and Justice, the weekly newspaper of the Social Democratic Federation. He became a regular contributor to at least the last of these, (using the style A. H. M. Robertson)

In 1910, having graduated, he entered the British Civil Service and at the outbreak of the war in 1914 he was working as private secretary to the Permanent Secretary of the British Admiralty. His position exempted him from active service, but he agonised, as did many on the left, about the morality of the conflict. Eventually he decided to support the war, on grounds which he much later described as "casuistry". He left the ILP and the Fabians but continued to contribute to rationalist and socialist publications, and wrote books. At this period he published using the pseudonym Robert Arch, partly to avoid confusion with his father, who was writing on topics in church history, and also to lower his profile with respect to his employers in the Admiralty.

In 1919 he met his old hero Belfort Bax, and after the latter's death in 1926 Robertson wrote a pamphlet of appreciation. Bax had introduced him to the Rationalist Press Association (RPA), which Robertson joined in 1920. In 1925 became a member of its board of directors. He took an active part in the decision to launch the Thinker's Library in 1929, and it was he who suggested that name for the series.

== 1931 onwards ==
Following the death of his father, in 1931 Robertson resigned from the civil service. He thereafter devoted himself to left-wing politics, history and the critique of the Christian religion, writing under his own name. With a number of others he became concerned that the RPA focussed too narrowly on the demolition of superstition and the popularisation of science, valuable though that work was. Robertson and his allies advocated a greater emphasis on social issues. As he a little later wrote to Charles Watts "... The younger generation are not interested in the criticism of religion except so far as it bears on social questions. They are interested in peace, economics and sex questions. And the RPA doesn't help them. ..." In 1931 a group of nine members who saw things in that way including C. E. M. Joad, J. B. Coates and J. A. Hobson stood for election to the RPA Board and were defeated. Disappointed, they decided to form the Federation of Progressive Societies and Individuals (FPSI). Robertson soon resigned from the RPA Board to devote his energies to the FPSI.

He made several trips to the Soviet Union, publishing his first impressions in Philosophers on Holiday. After his fourth visit, prompted partly also by the rise in Germany of Nazism, in 1938 he became a member of the Communist Party, and remained so for the rest of his life.

From the early 1940s he became reconciled with the RPA and most of his many subsequent books were published by Watts & Co, the RPA publisher.

For fifteen years following the end of World War II he was an Appointed Lecturer for the South Place Ethical Society, where his lectures were very popular and respected by his colleagues.

He died in Oxford on 14 October 1961. Robertson was married; his wife Sylvia survived him.

== Works ==
- A. H. M. Robertson (1918). "Ether, Matter, and the Soul". Hibbert Journal. 17 (520).
- Robert Arch (1920). Society and Superstition. A common sense view of religion. London: Pioneer Press.
- Robert Arch (1925). Wealth, work and wages : economics for everyone. London: Social Democratic Federation.
- Robert Arch (1926). Whence, Whither, and Why?. London: Watts & Co.
- Robert Arch (1927). E B Bax, Thinker and Pioneer. London: Hyndman Literary Committee.
- John William Draper (1927) [1874]. History of the Conflict between Religion & Science. With introduction and notes by Robert Arch. London: Watts & Co.
- Archibald Robertson (1933). Philosophers on Holiday: a Dialogue. London: Eric Partridge.
- Archibald Robertson (1942). The Bible and its Background. Thinker's Library. London: Watts & Co. (Volume I Volume II both 1949 second editions)
- Archibald Robertson (1945). Morals in World History. London: Watts & Co. (second edition in 1947)
- Archibald Robertson (1946). Jesus: Myth or History?. Thinker's Library. London: Watts & Co.
- Archibald Robertson (1948). Man his own Master: an Essay in Humanism. Thinker's Library. London: Watts & Co.
- Archibald Robertson (1949). The French Revolution. Thinker's Library. London: Watts & Co.
- Archibald Horace Mann Robertson (1949). Church and People in Britain: Religious Romance and Historical Reality. London: Watts & Co.
- Archibald Robertson (1952). How To Read History. London: Watts & Co.
- Archibald Robertson (1953). The Origins of Christianity. London: Lawrence & Wishart.
- Archibald Robertson (1954). Rationalism in Theory and Practice. London: Watts & Co.
- Archibald Robertson (1960). The Reformation. London: Watts & Co.
- Archibald Robertson (1960). Socialism and Religion: An Essay. London: Lawrence & Wishart.
