= Adam Gowans Whyte =

Scottish journalist, author, and translator

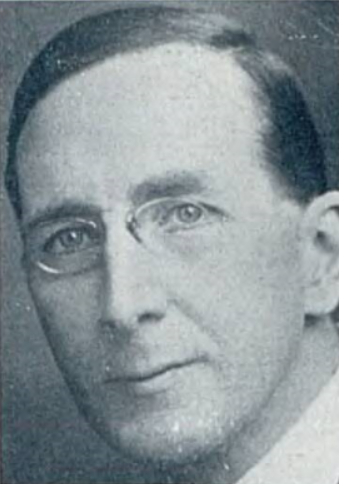
- Born: 1 August 1875; Glasgow, Scotland
- Died: 31 July 1950 (aged 74); Corsham, Wiltshire
- Education: University of Glasgow
- Occupations: Journalist; author; translator
- Employer: Rationalist Press Association
- Spouse: Kate E. Whyte

Adam Gowans Whyte (1 August 1875 – 31 July 1950) was a Scottish journalist, author, and translator. He was a well-known scientific journalist and regular contributor to the freethought press, and was a founder of the Rationalist Press Association.

== Life ==
Adam Gowans Whyte was born in Scotland in 1875, the seventh of nine children. His father, a dentist, died when he was twelve years old. He studied at Allan Glen's School, Glasgow, before attending the University of Glasgow in 1895.

Whyte moved to London in 1898, where he earned a living as a journalist.

== Rationalist Press Association ==
In 1899, Whyte co-founded the Rationalist Press Association (RPA). One of its original directors, he remained one until his death in 1950.

In 1930, Whyte began contributing a section called "The Open Window" to the beginning of each issue of the RPA's Literary Guide under the pseudonym "Protonius". He was later appointed Literary Advisor, earning a salary of £4000 a year, and played a significant role in selecting titles for Watts & Co. and their Thinker's Library until his death.

Whyte also edited various electrical publications. From 1901 until his retirement, he was editor of the Electrical Industries journal.

== Death ==
Whyte was the last surviving founder of the Rationalist Press Association. He died suddenly on 31 July 1950. Whyte was cremated on 3 August 1950 at Golders Green Crematorium, where the secular service was led by C. Bradlaugh Bonner.

== Selected bibliography ==
- Electricity in Locomotion, an account of its mechanism, its achievements and its prospects (1911)
- The Religion of the Open Mind (1913)
- The Natural History of Evil (1920)
- Stanley Baldwin: a biographical character study (1926)
- Forty years of electrical progress; the story of the G.E.C. (1930)
- Anthology of Errors (1940)
- The Danger of Being an Atheist (1940)
- Why Worry about Religion? A question for the new generation (1946)
- The story of the R.P.A., 1899-1949 (1949)
- The Ladder of Life: from molecule to mind (1951)
