= James C. Brown =

James C. Brown may refer to:

- James C. Brown (Ontario politician) (1868–1937), Ontario farmer and political figure
- James C. Brown (Pennsylvania politician) (1828–1892), member of the Pennsylvania Senate, and of the Pennsylvania House of Representatives
- James Campbell Brown (1843–1910), chemist and professor
- James Clark Brown (1830–1891), New Zealand MP in 1870 & 1871–1890
- James Clifford Brown (1923–2004), English composer
- James Clifton Brown (1841–1917), member of Parliament of the United Kingdom for Horsham, 1876–1880
- James Conway Brown (1838–1908), Welsh musician
- James Cooke Brown (1921–2000), American sociologist and science fiction author

== See also ==
- James A. C. Brown (1911–1964), Scottish psychiatrist
- James Brown (disambiguation)
