= Arnold Beck =

British engineer and academic

- Born: 7 August 1916
- Died: 11 October 1997 (aged 81)
- Education: Gresham's School, University College, London
- Spouse: Monica Ratcliffe
- Parent(s): Major Hugh Beck and Diana L. Beck
- Engineering career
- Discipline: electrical engineering
- Institutions: Institute of Electrical and Electronics Engineers

Arnold Hugh William Beck (7 August 1916 – 11 October 1997) was a British scientist and electrical engineer, a specialist in plasma and microwaves, Professor of Engineering in the University of Cambridge.

== Early life and education ==
The younger son of Major Hugh Beck and Diana L. Beck, the young Beck was educated at Gresham's School, Holt, and University College, London, where he graduated BSc Eng. His old college elected him to a Fellowship in 1979.

== Career ==
In 1937, after graduation, Beck became a research engineer with Henry Hughes & Sons, remaining with the firm until 1941. Then, with the Second World War in progress, he was seconded to the Admiralty Signal Establishment until 1945. From 1947 he was an engineer with Standard Telephones and Cables, ultimately as head of the Valve Research Division. In 1958 he was appointed a Lecturer in Electrical Engineering at Cambridge, where he led a group researching new ways to generate very high frequency radio waves. In 1964 he was promoted to Reader and in 1966 was elected to one of the three Professorships of Engineering established that year. He was also Head of the University's Electrical Division from 1971 to 1981, and when he retired in 1983 he was given the title of Emeritus Professor and was elected a Life Fellow of Corpus Christi, where he had been a Fellow since 1962.

== Personal life ==
In 1947, Beck married Monica, a daughter of Samuel K Ratcliffe, they had no children, but raised her son Nicolas Walter from her previous marriage to William Grey Walter. In 1959, he was elected a Fellow of the Institute of Electrical and Electronics Engineers.

== Publications ==
- Velocity Modulated Thermionic Tubes (1948)
- Thermionic Valves (1953)
- Space-charge Waves (1958)
- Words and Waves (1967)
- Introduction to Physical Electronics (with H. Ahmed) (1968)
- Handbook of Vacuum Physics, Vol. 2, Parts 5 and 6, 1968
- Statistical Mechanics, Fluctuations and Noise (1976)

== See also ==
- Sukumar Brahma
- Johan H. Enslin
