= Charles Duff =

Northern Irish writer

- Born: 7 April 1894; Enniskillen, County Fermanagh, Ireland
- Died: 15 October 1966 (aged 72)
- Education: Portora Royal School
- Occupations: Military officer and writer

Charles Duff (7 April 1894 – 15 October 1966) was a Northern Irish writer of books on language learning. He also wrote a popular book on hanging and other means of execution.

== Early life ==
Duff was born in Enniskillen, County Fermanagh, Ireland, and attended Portora Royal School (now Enniskillen Royal Grammar School), which is located in the town.

== Career ==
Duff served as an officer in the British Merchant Navy in World War I and then in the intelligence division of the Foreign Office and Her Majesty's Diplomatic Service. He resigned from the Foreign Office in the 1930s, claiming it was solidly supportive of fascism in Spain and ready to back a similar system in Britain.

== Languages ==
After he retired, Duff taught linguistics and languages in London and Singapore, while writing travel guides, histories, satires, and a series of text books for the active self-learner. He was fluent in seven languages. His many translations included works by Francisco de Quevedo, Émile Zola, B. Traven, Maxim Gorky, and Arnold Zweig.

Duff's best known book is A Handbook of Hanging. This also covers electrocution, decapitations, gassings, innocent men executed and botched executions. It has been reissued intermittently in the UK, for instance in 1948, 1953, 1954, 1974, etc., and in the United States in 1999, with an introduction by Christopher Hitchens.

Duff's book James Joyce and the Plain Reader (1932) is an introduction James Joyce's major works that seeks to guide "the plain reader" through the author's oeuvre. Duff both situates Joyce within a long literary tradition and emphasises his originality. In describing Joyce, Duff draws on ethnic stereotypes, describing Irish people as motivated by "a restless and often fantastic imagination". Joyce himself owned a copy of Duff's book, and the literary scholar Jean-Michel Rabaté argues that, when Joyce came to complete Finnegans Wake (1939), he was pleased with Duff's book and incorporated elements of Duff's thought into his work, including the vindication of the rights of the "plain reader". George Orwell, in a 1933 letter to Eleanor Jacques, described James Joyce and the Plain Reader as "weak trash, which would give the impression that J[oyce] was a writer on the [Hugh] Walpole—[J. B.] Priestley level."

== Works ==
- A Handbook on Hanging (later editions: A New Handbook on Hanging)
- Anthropological Report on a London Suburb (satire), 1935
- Russian for Beginners
- Spanish for Beginners
- French for Beginners
- Italian for Beginners
- German for Beginners
- How to Learn a Language, 1947
- French for Home Study
- England and the English
- The Basis and Essentials of French, 1940 (2nd edition)
- The Basis and Essentials of German (with Richard Freund)
- The Basis and Essentials of Spanish
- The Basis and Essentials of Italian
- The Basis and Essentials of Russian (with Anissime Krougliakoff)
- The Basis and Essentials of Portuguese and reader
- All Purpose Russian for Adults
- Six Days to Shake an Empire
- Italian for Adults
- Mysterious People: An Introduction to the Gypsies, 1965
- The Truth about Columbus and the Discovery of America, 1936
- Handrail and the Wampus; three segments of a polyphonic biogriad, 1931
- James Joyce and the Plain Reader, 1932
- This Human Nature (No. 64 in the Thinker's Library)

=== Short story ===
- "The Haunted Bungalow", London: Associated Newspapers, 1936
