= Elmer and Elsie (robots) =

Robots built in the 1940s

Elmer and Elsie (ELectroMEchanical Robot, Light-Sensitive) were two electronic robots that were built in the late 1940s by neurobiologist and cybernetician William Grey Walter. They were the first robots in history that were programmed to "think". Elmer and Elsie were often labeled as tortoises because of how they were shaped and the manner in which they moved. They were capable of phototaxis, which is the movement that occurs in response to light stimulus.

== Description ==
Elmer and Elsie, or the "tortoises" as they were known, were constructed between 1948 and 1949 using war surplus materials and old alarm clocks. They had a plastic shell and contained a single photocell light sensor, or a touch sensor, hooked up to two different paths that ran two different motors acting as two separate neuron brains.. The photocell enabled to robot to have phototropic behaviour -- it could follow light. The touch sensor told the robot when it had run into something, allowing it to turn away to avoid it, and so "explore" a room.

The robots were designed to show the interaction between both light-sensitive and touch-sensitive control mechanisms which were basically two nerve cells with visual and tactile inputs. These systems interacted with the motor drive in such a way that the tortoises were actually finding their way around obstacles.

In one experiment a light was placed on the nose of one of the tortoises. It appeared that the robot was looking at itself in a mirror. Its light began flickering and the robot started shaking as if excited to see itself in the mirror. Walter argued that if this behavior were seen in an animal it "might be accepted as evidence of some degree of self-awareness."

== Legacy ==
Elmer and Elsie inspired later generations of robotics researchers such as Rodney Brooks, Hans Moravec and Mark Tilden. Rodney Brooks' "Intelligence without Representation" is in many ways a modern take on Elmer and Elsie. Modern replicas of the tortoises may be found in the form of BEAM robotics. An original tortoise is on display in London, England in the Science Museum's Making the Modern World gallery. In 1995, one was replicated by Owen Holland, of the University of the West of England, which used some of the original parts. An original tortoise as seen at the Festival of Britain is in the collection of the Smithsonian Institution.

== See also ==
- Robotic vacuum cleaner
- Turtle (robot)
