= Natasha Walter =

British feminist writer (born 1967)

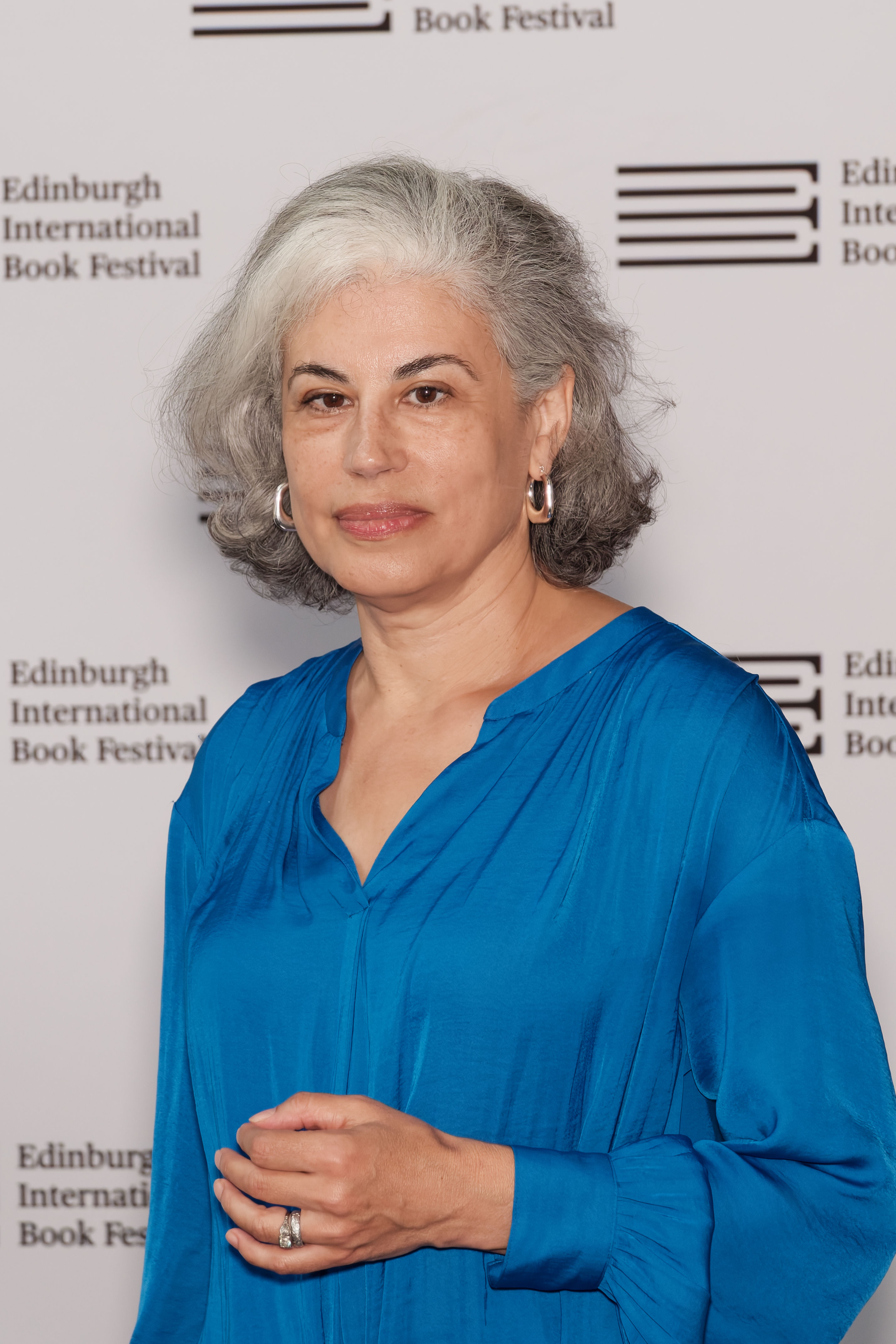
- Walter in 2026
- Born: 20 January 1967 (age 59)
- Education: St. John's College, Cambridge, Harvard
- Relatives: Nicolas Walter (father); William Grey Walter (grandfather)
- Writing career
- Genres: Non-fiction and fiction
- Notable works: The New Feminism (1998); Living Dolls: The Return of Sexism (2010); A Quiet Life (2016)
- Movement: Feminism

Natasha Walter (born 20 January 1967) is a British feminist writer and human rights activist. Her fifth book, Feminism for a World on Fire (2026, Virago) is published in 2026. She is the author of a novel, A Quiet Life (2016), and three other works of non-fiction: Before the Light Fades: A Family Story of Resistance (2023, Virago), Living Dolls: The Return of Sexism (2010, Virago), and The New Feminism (1998, Virago). She is also the founder of the charity Women for Refugee Women.

== Early life ==
Walter was brought up in a liberal Jewish household. Her father was Nicolas Walter, an anarchist and secular humanist writer, while her mother Ruth Walter (née Oppenheim) was a teacher and (later) social worker. Her grandfather was William Grey Walter, a neuroscientist. Her grandparents on her mother's side were Jewish refugees from Nazi Germany.

Walter read English at St John's College, Cambridge, graduating with a double first, and then won a Frank Knox Fellowship to Harvard.

== Career ==
Walter's first job was at Vogue magazine, and she subsequently became Deputy Literary Editor of The Independent and then a columnist and feature writer for The Guardian. She went on to write for many publications, and to appear regularly on BBC2's Newsnight Review and Radio 4's Front Row. In 1999 she was a judge on the Booker Prize and in 2013 she was a judge on the Women's Prize for Fiction (formerly the Orange Prize). She continued to write for The Guardian.

Walter was the founder in 2006 of the charity Women for Refugee Women, where she was the director until 2021. The charity supports women who seek asylum to tell their stories and challenges the injustices they experience.

In 2008 Women for Refugee Women produced the play Motherland which Natasha Walter wrote based on the experiences of women and children in immigration detention. It was directed by Juliet Stevenson and performed at the Young Vic in 2008 by Juliet Stevenson, Harriet Walter and others. Women for Refugee Women subsequently worked in partnership with other organisations to campaign for the end to the detention of children for immigration purposes in the UK, a policy which the government announced it would end in 2010.

Women for Refugee Women publishes research on the experiences of women in the asylum process, campaigns for an end to the detention of refugee women, and supports refugee women throughout the UK.

Walter is the author of The New Feminism, published by Virago in 1998. Her book Living Dolls, also published by Virago, looks at the resurgence of sexism in contemporary culture.

In March 2015, Natasha Walter was the Humanitas Visiting Professor of Women's Rights at Cambridge University.

Walter is also the author of a novel, A Quiet Life, which is based loosely on the life of Melinda Marling, the wife of Cambridge spy Donald Maclean.

Walter's memoir, Before the Light Fades, was published by Virago in 2023. It tells the story of her mother's death by suicide, and the legacy of the political activism of her mother in the 1960s and that of her grandfather in the 1930s.

== Personal life ==
Walter lives in London with her partner and their two children. She is Jewish.

In October 2019, Walter was arrested for blocking a road in Extinction Rebellion's 'October Rebellion' in London's Trafalgar Square. She tweeted: "I was one of 100s arrested yesterday for drawing attention to the destruction of our beautiful planet." She has continued to be active with Extinction Rebellion and Writers Rebel, a group of writers involved with the climate movement.

== Works ==
- The New Feminism (1998). ISBN 978-1-86049-636-3
- On the Move: Feminism for a New Generation (1999, as editor). ISBN 978-1-86049-818-3
- Living Dolls (2009). ISBN 978-1-84408-484-5
- A Quiet Life (2016). ISBN 978-0008113759
- Before the Light Fades: A Family Story of Resistance (2023). ISBN 978-0349017822

== Recognition ==
She was recognized as one of the BBC 100 Women of 2013.
