= Professor of Engineering (Cambridge) =

The Professorships of Engineering are several established and personal professorships at the University of Cambridge.

The senior professorship in the university's Department of Engineering was founded in 1875 as the Professorship of Mechanism and Applied Mechanics, renamed to the Professorship of Mechanical Sciences in 1934, and then to Professorship of Engineering in 1966.

Also 1966, the university established three further permanent Professorships of Engineering. However, in 2001 one of these 1966 chairs was suppressed in order to fund the establishment of the Prince Philip Professorship of Technology to mark the 80th birthday of the university's then-Chancellor. In 2011, another of the 1966 chairs was renamed the Sir Kirby Laing Professorship of Civil Engineering.

In 1974, the university established another Professorship of Engineering on a permanent basis, replacing a single-tenure professorship vacated in the same year. The 1974 professorship was itself replaced by a professorship established in 2012, with the additional creation intended to afford a brief period of overlap between the 1974 and 2012 professors.

The university has also established Professorships of Engineering limited to a single tenure (i.e. personal chairs) for various specific individuals.

== Professors of engineering (1875) ==
=== Professors of Mechanism and Applied Mechanics ===
- James Stuart (1875–1889)
- Alfred Ewing (1890–1903)
- Bertram Hopkinson (1903–1918)
- Charles Inglis (1919–1934) (professorship renamed in 1934)

=== Professors of Mechanical Sciences ===
- Charles Edward Inglis (1934–1943) (incumbent since 1919)
- John F. Baker, Lord Baker (1943–1966) (professorship renamed in 1966)

=== Professors of Engineering ===
- John F. Baker, Lord Baker (1966–1968) (incumbent since 1943)
- Peter McGregor Ross (1970–1974)
- David Edward Newland (1976–2003)
- Daniel Wolpert (2005–2013)

== Professors of Engineering (1966, suppressed in 2001) ==
- Arnold Beck (1966–1970)
- John Edward Carroll (1983–2001)

== Professors of Engineering (1966) ==
- Kenneth H. Roscoe (1968–1970)
- Michael F. Ashby (1973)
- Stephen Williamson (1989–1997)
- Gehan Anil Joseph Amaratunga (1998–)

== Professors of engineering (1967) ==
=== Professors of Engineering ===
- John Horlock (1967–1974)
- Andrew N. Schofield (1974)
- Robert J. Mair, Lord Mair (1998–2011) (professorship renamed in 2011)

=== Sir Kirby Laing Professors of Civil Engineering ===
- Robert J. Mair, Lord Mair (2011–2017) (incumbent since 1998)
- Mark Girolami (2019–)

== Professors of Engineering (1974, suppressed in 2013) ==
- Alistair MacFarlane (1974–1988)
- Keith Glover (1989–2013)

== Professors of Engineering (2012) ==
- Rodolphe Juan Sepulchre (2013–)

== Professors of Engineering (single-tenure creations) ==
- John Flavell Coales (1965–1974)
- Jacques Heyman (1971–1992)
- Kenneth L. Johnson (1977–1992)
- Richard William Prager (2008–)
