= Owen Holland (academic) =

Owen Holland (born 1947) is professor emeritus of cognitive robotics (Informatics) in the Sackler Centre for Consciousness Science at the University of Sussex. He was until recently a professor of computer science at the University of Essex, England. Previously, he has held faculty positions at Caltech, Bielefeld University, Starlab and the University of the West of England.

Holland is best known for his work in biologically-inspired robotics, where he has contributed to the theory and practice of collective robotics, ant algorithms and machine consciousness, among other sub-fields. Some of the projects he has been involved in have attracted attention from the media, notably the Slugbot project, which aimed to produce a robotic predator capable of sustaining its energy levels from hunting and digesting slugs. Holland is also known for recovering and restoring one of Grey Walter's robot 'tortoises'.

For the last ten years he has mainly been interested in the prospects for building a conscious machine. In 2001 he was an organiser and session chair for one of the first symposia on machine consciousness, and in 2003 he edited a special issue of the Journal of Consciousness Studies on the topic. In 2004 he obtained the first major funding for a machine consciousness project which investigated whether a human-like robot with a self-model and a world-model might exhibit features characteristic of consciousness. The robot, CRONOS, was further developed in a European project ECCEROBOT led by Holland, which ran from 2009 – 2011. Holland has been an active contributor to most of the machine consciousness symposia held in the last decade, and serves on the editorial board of the International Journal of Machine Consciousness.
