= George Stanley Godwin =

English author

George Stanley Godwin (1889–1974) was an English writer of fiction and non-fiction books.

== Childhood and youth ==
George S. Godwin was born in London, England, the youngest boy of a large family, and was only three years old when his father died. He was educated at boarding schools. Failing his studies at college he spent a couple of years in Germany. After returning to England Godwin reportedly worked briefly for a German bank in England. In the spring of 1909 he was admitted to membership of the Middle Temple and started studying law. His mother died in 1910.

== Whonnock years ==
In September 1911 Godwin, then age 22, left for British Columbia, Canada, where one of his brothers managed a real estate agency. George Godwin was employed as "real estate broker" with the agency, but that ended with the arrival of his future wife, Dorothy Alicia Purdon from Ireland. They married in the spring of 1912 and moved to acreage in Whonnock, British Columbia. Godwin’s dreams of living off the land did not materialize. Godwin's first novel, The Eternal Forest (1929), was inspired by his years in Whonnock.

== War years ==
At the outbreak of the First World War, Godwin wanted to join the Canadian armed forces, but was rejected for active service because of poor eyesight. He returned with his wife and son to England in 1915, where he joined the Canadian Expeditionary Force after all and embarked for France in September 1916 with the 29th Vancouver Battalion. In the summer of 1917, after suffering a "severe cold" in France the previous winter, Godwin was hospitalized in England. He did not return to France but was assigned to a different Canadian unit in Britain. In December 1918, diagnosed with pulmonary tuberculosis, he was shipped to Canada and placed in the Balfour Military Sanatorium in the West Kootenay, BC, for recovery. Godwin returned to England and his family in the summer of 1920. His second novel, Why Stay We Here? (1932), closely follows Godwin's own wartime experiences. This book starts and ends at the same community described in The Eternal Forest.

== Freelancer, author, and publisher ==
Although Godwin was called to the bar in the fall of 1917 (in absentia) he did not pursue a career in law. During his stay in British Columbia, Godwin had freelanced for Vancouver newspapers and upon his return to England writing became his profession. He made a good income mostly as freelance for newspapers, magazines and publicity people. That allowed the family some luxury and his five children the education they desired. Aside from freelancing, the main source of his income, Godwin wrote a good number of fiction and non-fiction books. His efforts in publishing, started in the mid 1930s under the style The Acorn Press, ended because of the paper shortage of the war years. Godwin tried to enlist with the army, was rejected, but found employment writing for the War Office.

== After the Second World War ==
Godwin resumed his work as a writer and freelancer. Starting in the fall of 1949 he was for a year the editor of the literary quarterly The Adelphi. Godwin and his wife spent their final years living in the countryside near Cripps Corner in Sussex in a house that combined two old cottages. Their property included seven acres of woodland as well as an established orchard. Godwin continued writing and had plans for another book but that did not materialize. His last book was published in 1957.

== Bibliography ==
=== Fiction ===
- The Eternal Forest. London: P. Alan, 1929, 318 pp.
- The Eternal Forest, under western skies. New York: Appleton, 1929. Reissued by Godwin Books, R. S. Thomson ed., 1994.
- Why Stay We Here?. London: P. Alan and New York: Appleton, 1930. 332 pp. Reissued by Godwin Books, R. S. Thomson ed., 2003.
- Empty Victory: A futuristic novel. London: John Long, 1932. 288 pp.
- "The Lake of Memory", (serialized in The Adelphi, 1950)

=== Biography ===
- Vancouver, A Life: 1757–1798. London: Philip Alan, 1930 and New York Appleton. 308 pp.

=== Play ===
- The Disciple: a play in three acts. London: Acorn Press, 1936. 88 pp.

=== Non-fiction ===
- Cain; or, the future of crime. London: Paul Kegan, 1928; New York: Dutton, 108 pp.
- Columbia; or, the future of Canada. London: Paul Kegan, New York: Dutton, 1928. 95 pp.
- Discovery: The Story of the Finding of the World. London: Heath, Cranton, 1933. 96 pp.
- Peter Kürten: A Study in Sadism. The Acorn Press, 1938. 58 pp.
- Queen Mary College, An Adventure in Education. London: Queen Mary College and Acorn Press, 1939. 209 pp.
- The Land our Larder: the story of the Surfleet experiment and its significance in war. London: Acorn Press, 1939, 2nd Edition 1940. 127 pp.
- Our Woods in War: a survey of their vital rôle in defence. London: Acorn Press. 1940. 116 pp.
- Priest or Physician? A study of faith-healing. London: Watts, Thinkers Forum No. 10, 1941. 44 pp.
- Japan’s New Order. London: Watts, Thinkers Forum No. 23. 1942. 32 pp.
- A Century of Trading: The story of the Firm of White, Child & Beney. Ed. George Godwin, London: White, Child & Beney, [1943] 31 pp. (Samuel White & Co. Exporter of Textile Machinery Sundries.)
- Marconi (1939–45): A War Record. London: Chatto and Windus, 1946. 125 pp. Also a French version: Marconi, 1939–1945, sa contribution à l'effort de guerre, Londres: Chatto and Windus, 1947
- The Great Mystics. London: Watts, Thinkers Library No. 106, 1945. 106 pp. Folcroft Library Edition, 1974. Norwood Editions, 1976, etc.
- Hansons of Eastcheap: The Study of the House Samuel Hanson and Son Ltd., London, private printing for S. Hanson & Son, 1947
- The Mystery of Anna Berger. London: Watts, Thinkers Library No. 130, 1948. 226 pp.
- The Trial of Peter Griffiths: The Blackburn Baby Murder. Griffith, Peter, George Godwin ed. London: W. Hodge, 1950. Notable British Trials 219 pp.
- The Great Revivalists. London: Watts, Thinkers Library, No. 140, 1951. 220 pp.; Boston: Beacon Press. 1950.
- The Middle Temple: the Society and Fellowship. London: Staples Press. 1954. 174 pp.
- Crime and Social Action. London: Watts, 1956. 277 pp.
- Criminal Man. New York: Braziller, 1957. 277 pp.
- Geoff, self-published, 1967. in memory of his son Geoffrey Stephen Godwin who died at sea.

Aside from George Godwin's Peter Kürten, a study in sadism, The Acorn Press also published in 1938 The Sadist, an account of the crimes of Peter Kürten, by Karl Berg. Authorized translation by Olga Illmer and George Godwin. 177 pp. This book was re-issued in 1945 by The Medical Press in New York and Heinemann in London.
