= First and Last Things =

1908 book by H. G. Wells

- First edition (UK)
- Author: H. G. Wells
- Original title: First and Last Things: A Confession of Faith and a Rule of Life
- Language: English
- Subject: Philosophy
- Publisher: Archibald Constable (UK); G.P. Putnam's Sons (US)
- Publication date: November 1908
- Publication place: United Kingdom
- Pages: 307
- Preceded by: New Worlds for Old
- Followed by: The War in the Air

First and Last Things is a 1908 work of philosophy by H. G. Wells setting forth his beliefs in four "books" entitled "Metaphysics," "Of Belief," "Of General Conduct," and "Some Personal Things." Parts of the book were published in the Independent Magazine in July and August 1908. Wells revised the book extensively in 1917, in response to his religious conversion, but later published a further revision in 1929 that restored much of the book to its earlier form. Its main intellectual influences are Darwinism and certain German thinkers Wells had read, such as August Weismann. The pragmatism of William James, who had become a friend of Wells, was also an influence.

== Summary ==
In the first book, Wells emphasises his scepticism: neither the senses nor the mind can be relied upon uncritically, and "The world of fact is not what it appears to be." Beliefs are not convictions, but rather positions arrived at "exactly as an artist makes a picture" and are adopted "because I feel a need for them, because I feel an often quite unanalysable rightness in them. . . . My belief in them rests upon the fact that they work for me and satisfy a desire for harmony and beauty."

In the second book, devoted to his "essential beliefs," Wells asserts as "quite an arbitrary act of my mind" and "a choice" his "most comprehensive belief": "the external and the internal and myself . . . make one universe in which I and every part are ultimately important." On this point, he refuses argument, calling this "unfounded and arbitrary declaration" to be his "fundamental religious confession." But he rejects use of "the name of God" because "the run of people" would misunderstand his meaning. He affirms the freedom of the will, and asserts that "'What am I to do?' is the perpetual question of our existence." After analysing the various motives to action that he feels, he resolves them by embracing a "ruling idea," viz. an historically emerging "solidarity of humanity," although he acknowledges that "the species is still as a whole unawakened, still sunken in the delusion of the permanent separateness of the individual and of races and nations." Wells, however, regards this solidarity of humanity as a biological "fact." The direction of this human development is "to Power and Beauty," but he takes a confessedly "mystical" attitude in regard to these terms, refusing to define, or even to distinguish them. He rejects personal immortality. He criticises the Christianity he was raised in because he does not believe in the existence of "a divine-human friend and mediator" (though he admits the "splendid imaginative appeal" of the idea). He regards "all religions to be in a measure true," but also as "false."

In the third book, by far the longest and occupying more than half the volume, Wells develops the "rule of life" that he promises in its subtitle. This involves a resolve to work for Socialism, which he considers to be "a great social and political movement that correlates itself with my conception of a great synthesis of human purpose as the aspect towards us of the universal scheme." But he rejects the notion of "rights" and "justice" as grounds for this conception: "There is no equity in the universe." Wells refers frequently in this part of First and Last Things to volumes he wrote in the preceding six or seven years on this perspective, addressing also such tactical questions as the attitude an individual intent on furthering social change ought to take toward existing institutions and conventions. "So far as he possibly can a man must conform to common prejudices, prevalent customs and all laws,—whatever his estimate of them may be." This book also contains a prophetic section on the nature of modern warfare, and several on women, sex, and marriage that were considered remarkably bold and provocative in Edwardian England.

In the final book, Wells "shamelessly" offers some personal reflections about love, death, and life. "Passionate love" is "the intensest thing in life"; "It is the essential fact of love as I conceive it, that it breaks down the boundaries of self." The concluding sentence of First and Last Things is: "In the ultimate I know, though I cannot prove my knowledge in any way whatever, that everything is right and all things mine."

== Background ==
First and Last Things was written at a time when Wells's "private life was to a considerable degree in turmoil." Amber Reeves, his lover, who inspired Ann Veronica and would in 1909 bear a daughter by Wells, was a brilliant student of philosophy at the University of Cambridge's Newnham College. Indeed, some passages of First and Last Things contain criticisms of Wells's ideas by a "friend" who is doubtless Amber Reeves.

The origins of the First and Last Things are to be found in a reading and discussion group of which Amber Reeves was a part. The group was "based originally on the Young Fabians and probably closely affiliated with the Oxford socialist movement." Wells was invited in the fall of 1907 to deliver three lectures to the group, and as he says in the volume's opening pages, "my notes soon outran the possibilities" and he "expanded these memoranda into a book."

== Reception ==
First and Last Things received few contemporary reviews.
