= Samuel Kerkham Ratcliffe =

English journalist and lecturer (1868-1958)

Samuel Kerkham Ratcliffe (1868–1958) was an English journalist and lecturer.

== Life ==
Ratcliffe's father owned a King's Lynn flour mill, but moved to work as a railway clerk in Manchester when that business failed. Samuel was sent to be live with an aunt and attend school in London. He started working as a journalist for The Echo, edited by John Passmore Edwards, eventually rising to be leader-writer.

In May 1902 Ratcliffe joined the Indian English-language newspaper The Statesman as its assistant editor under Paul Knight. Later that year he met Sister Nivedita, who would become a lifelong friend. In 1903 Ratcliffe became the acting editor of The Statesman, and continued with the newspaper until 1907 when he was forced to resign for espousing Indian nationalism. Returning to London, he worked for the Daily News under A. G. Gardiner, as well as writing for the Manchester Guardian, The Spectator, the Nation and the Contemporary Review. Ratcliffe was editor of the Sociological Review from 1910 to 1917.

Ratcliffe began lecturing for the South Place Ethical Society in 1912. In 1913 he delivered a series of lectures to the League of Political Education in New York. For the next three decades he spent the winter months lecturing across the United States: "It is probable", suggested his Manchester Guardian obituarist, "that no Englishman ever travelled so many miles in America or was heard by so many thousands of people there as he." He also continued lecturing in England, where he became a member of the South Place Ethical Society's panel in 1915 and in the 1930s was the society's most regular lecturer.

== Personal life ==
Ratcliffe's son was the scientist Francis Ratcliffe, and one of his two daughters Katherine Monica Ratcliffe (1911-2012) married the neurophysiologist W. Grey Walter and their only child was Nicolas Walter his grandson. After the couple divorced in 1945, Monica married Cambridge University scientist Arnold Beck with whom she brought up Nicolas.
