= C. Marsh Beadnell =

Surgeon Rear-Admiral Charles Marsh Beadnell, CB (17 February 1872 – 27 September 1947), best known as C. Marsh Beadnell, was a British surgeon and Royal Navy officer.

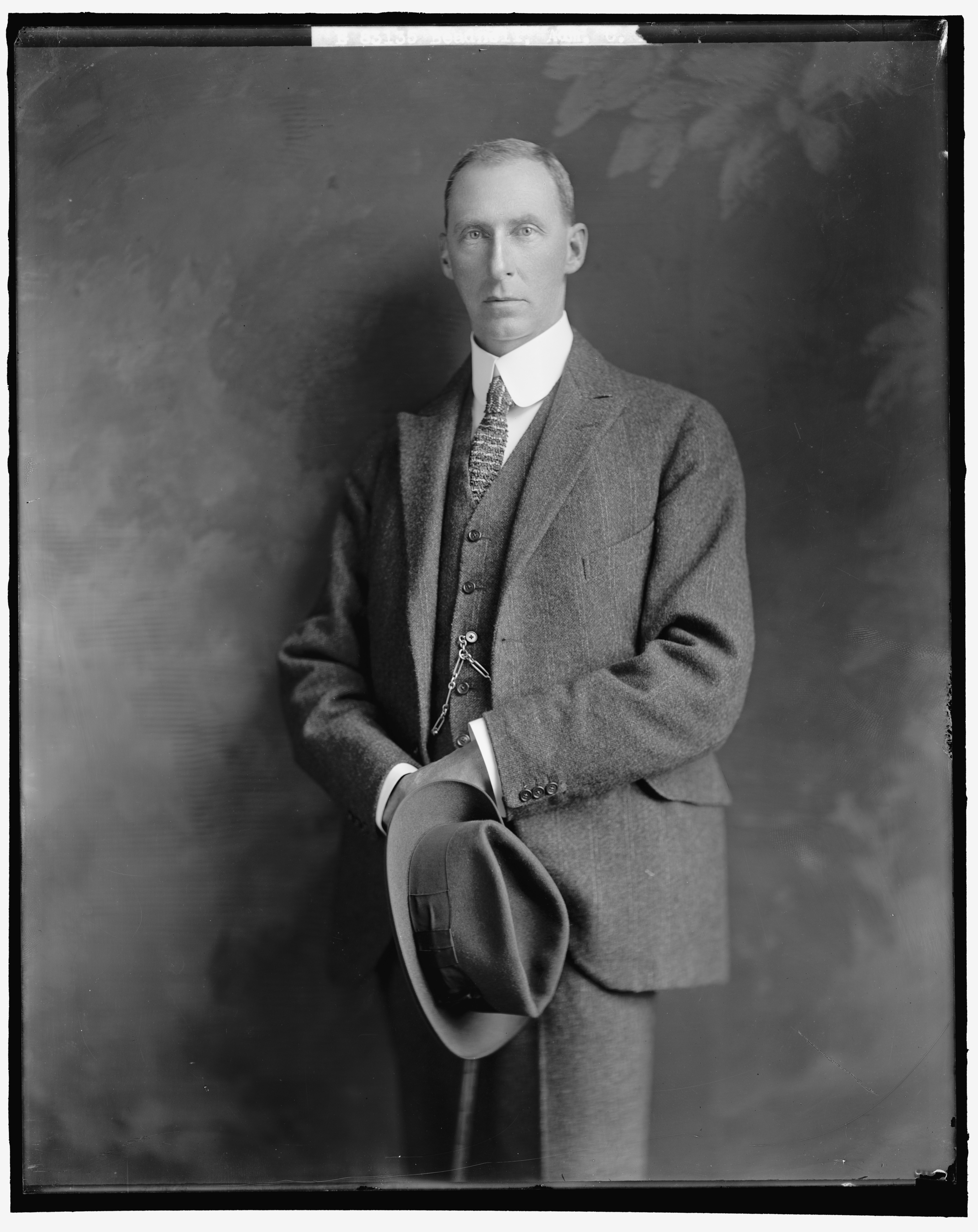

Beadnell was born in Rawalpindi. He was educated at Cheltenham College and studied medicine at Guy's Hospital. He was a Fellow of the Chemical Society and of the Royal Anthropological Institute. A rationalist and sceptic, he was president of the Rationalist Press Association (1940–1947).

He was appointed a Companion of the Order of the Bath (CB) in the 1924 Birthday Honours.

Beadnell described himself as a "devout agnostic". He died in Petersfield, Hampshire.

== Selected publications ==
- The Reality or Unreality of Spiritualistic Phenomena: Being a Criticism of Dr. W.J. Crawford's Investigation into Levitations and Raps (1920)
- A Picture Book of Evolution: Adapted from the Work of the Late Dennis Hird (1932)
- Fireside Science (1934) [with Ray Lankester]
- Dictionary of Scientific Terms, as Used in the Various Sciences (1938)
- The Origin of the Kiss and Other Scientific Diversions (1942)
- An Encyclopaedic Dictionary of Science and War (1943)
