= Rationalist Association =

Irreligious organisation in the United Kingdom

The Rationalist Association
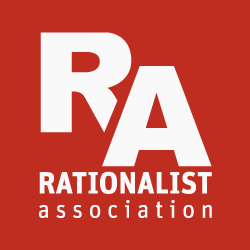
- Merged into: Humanists UK (2025)
- Formation: 1885
- Founder: Charles Albert Watts
- Location: United Kingdom
- Products: New Humanist; Thinker's Library
- President: Laurie Taylor
- Chair of Trustees: Clive Coen
- Key people: Harold Blackham; Nicholas Walter; Vera Brittain; Hector Hawton; Jonathan Miller
- Website: rationalist.org.uk

The Rationalist Association was a charity in the United Kingdom which published New Humanist magazine between 1885 and 2025. Since 2025, the Rationalist Press has been the publishing imprint of Humanists UK.

The original Rationalist Press Association (RPA) was founded in 1885 by a group of freethinkers who were unhappy with the increasingly political and decreasingly intellectual tenor of the British secularist movement, which made its name publishing cheap reprints of classic literature – such as works by Charles Darwin and John Stuart Mill – through its Thinker's Library series, along with literature that was deemed too anti-religious to be handled by mainstream publishers and booksellers.

In 2002, the RPA became a wholly owned subsidiary of the Rationalist Association, a charity established to continue its work. In 2025, the Rationalist Association merged with Humanists UK, which took over ownership of the RPA and publication of New Humanist. As the Rationalist Press, the original 1885 RPA became the publishing imprint of Humanists UK.

== History ==
The impetus for the creation of the Rationalist Press Association can be traced back to Charles Albert Watts, the publisher who printed the National Reformer and a majority of Charles Bradlaugh's books. In 1890 Watts formed the Propagandist Press Committee, with George Jacob Holyoake as president, in order to circumvent the problem caused by booksellers who refused to handle secularist books. Holyoake remained president as the committee changed its name to the Rationalist Press Committee and finally settled on the Rationalist Press Association in 1899. Members of the association paid a subscription fee and received books annually to the value of that fee.

The Association became quite successful after 1902, when it started selling reprints of serious scientific works by authors such as Julian Huxley, Ernst Haeckel and Matthew Arnold. It achieved even greater success through the Thinker's Library series of books, published by Watts & Co. from 1929 until 1951 under the leadership of Charles Watts's son Fredrick. The Association's continued success in selling books of a heretical nature, mostly by agnostic or atheist authors, contributed to a growing rationalist zeal and a growing demand for this type of literature. By 1959 the Association had reached its highest membership, with more than 5,000 members. Yet its success also contributed to its demise: rationalist literature became so popular that the Association's readership was taken by larger, more established mainstream publishers. The result was a steady decline in membership.

In 2002, the Association changed its name to The Rationalist Association.

In 2006, Jonathan Miller was chosen to be its president. He said in response to being chosen: "Not believing in religion is very widespread, but I think this community gets overlooked. I am flattered and honoured".

In Jan 2025, the organisation merged with Humanists UK, which now publishes the quarterly magazine, New Humanist.

== Presidents and chairs ==
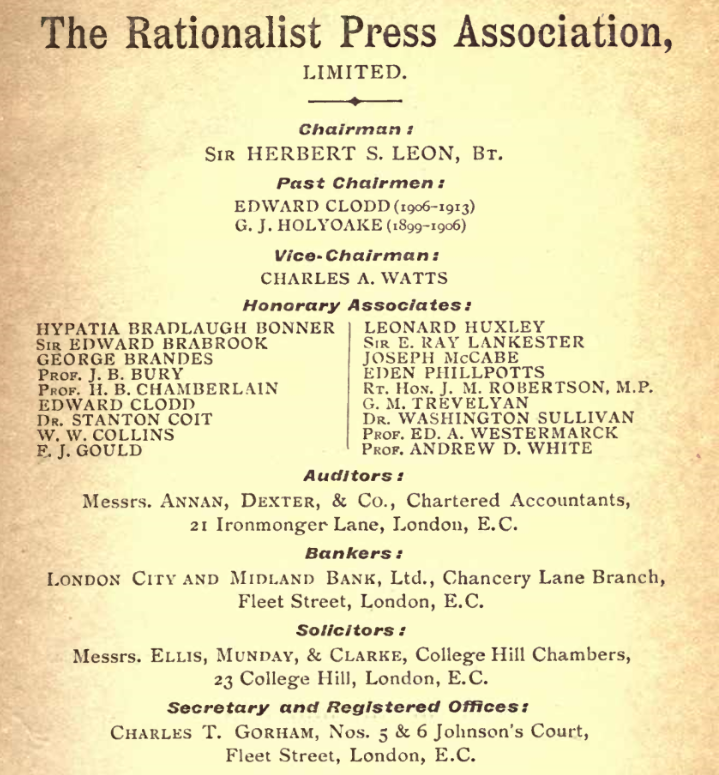
Rationalist Press Association members for 1917 published in The R.P.A. Annual for the Year 1917

Presidents and chairs of the Rationalist Association
1913–1922	Herbert Leon
1922–1926	
1926–1929	Graham Wallas
1929–1933	Harold Laski
1933–1940	Harry Snell, 1st Baron Snell
1940–1947	Charles Marsh Beadnell
1948–1949	C. D. Darlington
1949–1954	A. E. Heath
1955–1970	Bertrand Russell
1970–1973	Barbara Wootton, Baroness Wootton of Abinger
1973–1981	Peter Ritchie Calder
1982–1999	Hermann Bondi

== See also ==
- Conway Hall Ethical Society
- Humanists UK
- International Humanist and Ethical Union
- National Secular Society
- Rationalist Society of Australia

== Bibliography ==
- Haynes, E. S. P. (1907), Religious Persecution. A study in political psychology.
- "Our Book Column". The Sydney Stock and Station Journal (NSW: 1896-1924). NSW: National Library of Australia. 12 April 1907. p. 3.
- Mill, John Stuart (1907), Three Essays on Religion
- Gould, F.J. (1929), The Pioneers of Johnson's Court, London: Watts & Co.
- Whyte, Adam Gowans (1949), The Story of the R.P.A. 1899-1949, London: Watts & Co.
- Cooke, Bill (2003), The Blasphemy Depot: A Hundred Years of the Rationalist Press Association, London: Rationalist Press Association, ISBN 0-301-00302-5
