= Ernest Mander =

Alfred Ernest Mander (13 December 1894 – 26 February 1985) was a British psychology writer and political activist who became prominent in New Zealand and Australia.

Born in Great Malvern in Worcestershire, Mander was educated at Queen's College, Taunton, and became a journalist before studying law at the University of Birmingham.

During World War I, Mander served in France with the Royal Field Artillery, then from 1917 worked for the Ministries of Munitions and Labour. He became active in the socialist movement, serving on the first committee of Hands Off Russia. He became the general secretary of the National Union of Ex-Service Men, and sold his house in order to help finance it. However, the group dissolved late in 1920, and Mander emigrated to New Zealand, where he lectured at the Victoria University College.

Mander's political views had moved to the right, and in 1929 he became the dominion secretary of the Reform Party. The party was at a low ebb, having suffered a serious defeat in the 1928 New Zealand general election, and Mander moved on to become general secretary of the New Zealand Manufacturers' Federation.

In 1935, Mander began writing books on psychology in Psychology for Everyman (and Woman) being followed in 1936 by Clearer Thinking (Logic for Everyman). The titles were frequently revised and in print until at least 1970, selling around 600,000 copies. In 1936, he also wrote To Alarm New Zealand, which argued that white British immigrants to the country should be encouraged.

Around the end of 1937, Mander emigrated to Sydney in Australia, and became secretary of the New South Wales Employment Council. In 1938, he wrote Alarming Australia, following the themes of To Alarm New Zealand.

Mander served in the Australian Intelligence Corps in the early years of World War II, then the Second Australian Imperial Force from 1941. Although he was temporarily promoted to major, he was placed in reserve in 1942, and found time to write Our Sham Democracy, which argued that voters lacked the knowledge to make decisions based on the latest knowledge. He worked for the New South Wales Public Service, continued to write, and also lectured part-time for the Workers' Educational Association. On occasion, he appeared on television, on the "Nation's Forum of the Air".
