= Hector Hawton =

British author (1901–1975)

Hector Hawton (7 February 1901 – 14 December 1975) was a British humanist, novelist and rationalist writer.

== Biography ==
Hawton was born in Plymouth and was educated at Plymouth College. He married Mary Bishop, they had two sons. He worked as a journalist for the Western Morning News (1919–1923), National Press Agency (1923–1927) and was an editor for Empire News (1927–1929).

During World War II he worked for No. 4 Group RAF at Heslington Hall, Yorkshire. He was managing director of the Rationalist Press Association (1952–1971) and editor for The Humanist.

Hawton is credited with drafting the original Amsterdam Declaration during the first World Humanist Congress of Humanists International (then: International Humanist and Ethical Union, IHEU) in the Netherlands, from 22 to 27 August 1952. During the congress the general assembly agreed on a statement of the fundamental principles of modern Humanism.

Hawton was sympathetic to the Christ myth theory. He wrote the introduction to the 1967 reprint of J. M. Robertson's book Pagan Christs. He ghostwrote many of the books attributed to Eustace Chesser.

Hawton authored many novels, including science fiction. Some of these were published under the pseudonyms Jack Lethaby or John Sylvester.

He identified as a Marxist but later moved away from this viewpoint. He has been described as "one of the most significant humanists in postwar Britain."

== Publications ==
Nonfiction

- Flight From Reality (1941)
- Night Bombing (1944)
- The Men Who Fly (1944)
- Men Without Gods (1948)
- Philosophy for Pleasure (1949)
- Why be Moral?: How to Decide What is Right and What is Wrong Without Invoking a Supernatural Law-Giver (1947)
- The Thinker's Handbook: A Guide to Religious Controversy (1950)
- The Feast of Unreason (1952)
- Reason in Action (1956) [with Archibald Robertson, J. B. Coates, Donald Ford and H. J. Blackham]
- The Humanist Revolution (1963)
- Controversy: The Humanist/Christian Encounter (1971)

Novels

- Murder Cave (1934)
- Frozen Fire (1935)
- Murder at H.Q. (1935)
- Unnatural Causes (1947)
- Murder by Mathematics (1948)
- The Case of the Crazy Atom (1948)
- Master of the World (1949)
- Tower of Darkness (1950)
- Blue-Eyed Buddha (1951)
- Operation Superman (1951)
- Black Emperor (1952)
- Death of a Witch (1952)
- The Flying Saucer (1952)
- The Lost Valley (1953)
- Rope for the Judge (1954)
- Skeleton in the Cupboard (1955)
- The Green Scorpion (1957)
