= New Humanist =

Quarterly magazine published by Humanists UK

- Editor: Niki Seth-Smith
- Deputy Editor: Jessica Abrahams
- Chair of Editorial Board: Ian Dunt
- Categories: Humanism, rationalism
- Frequency: Quarterly
- Publisher: Humanists UK
- Founded: 1885 (under the name Watt's Literary Guide)
- Country: United Kingdom
- Based in: London
- Language: English
- Website: newhumanist.org.uk
- ISSN: 0306-512X

New Humanist is a British current affairs magazine, published by Humanists UK and based in London, that focuses on culture, news, philosophy, and science from a sceptical perspective.

== History ==
New Humanist has been in print for 141 years, starting out life as Watts's Literary Guide, founded by C. A. Watts in November 1885. It later became The Literary Guide and Rationalist Review (1894–1954), Humanist (1956–1971) and New Humanist in 1972.

Notable columnists, past and present, include Laurie Taylor, Simon Hoggart, Sally Feldman, Shaparak Khorsandi, Samira Ahmed, Marcus Chown and Michael Rosen.

Jim Herrick was editor of New Humanist from 1984 until 2002, and subsequently became the journal's literary editor until his retirement in 2005. From 2002 until 2005 the magazine's editor was Frank Jordans. In 2005 Caspar Melville took over as managing editor of the magazine and CEO of the Rationalist Association. Daniel Trilling assumed the position of editor in 2013. Samira Shackle was editor from spring 2020 to spring 2023.

Niki Seth-Smith is the current Editor. New Humanist was shortlisted for the Foreign Press Association awards in 2023 and won the Piazza Grande Religion Journalism Award in 2023 and 2024.

In January 2025, the Rationalist Association, which had published the magazine for its first 139 years, merged with Humanists UK. In May that year, Humanists UK announced it had appointed Ian Dunt to chair the magazine's new editorial board. In February 2026, Humanists UK announced it had appointed additional editorial board members in the form of writer Shaparak Khorsandi, geneticist Adam Rutherford, AI expert Kate Devlin, physicist Jim Al-Khalili, author Natasha Walter, journalist Stephen Bush, sociologist Laurie Taylor, broadcaster and journalist Samira Ahmed, political scienist Brian Klaas, reporter Peter Geogheghan, columnist Polly Toynbee, and the philosophers AC Grayling and Jonathan Wolff.
