= Hassan Bevrani =

Academician in electrical engineering

- Born: 1968 (age 57–58)
- Occupation: Professor
- Known for: Fellow member of IEEE.

Hassan Bevrani is a distinguished academician in the field of electrical engineering. He earned his PhD from Osaka University in 2004. Currently, he holds the position of a professor and is the Program Leader of the Micro/Smart Grids Research Center (SMGRC) at the University of Kurdistan, where he also serves as the Vice Chancellor for Research. He is a fellow member of IEEE.

Bevrani's contributions to electrical engineering, particularly in the realms of power system stability and smart grid operations, have made him a pivotal figure in the field.

== Education ==
Hassan Bevrani holds a Ph.D. degree in electrical engineering. His full education history is given below.

- BSc. in Electrical Engineering, Ferdowsi University, Mashhad, Iran (1986 - 1991)
  - Thesis title: Frame Grabber: design and Implementation
- MSc. in Electrical Engineering, K. N. Toosi University of Technology, Tehran, Iran (1994 - 1997)
  - Thesis title: Modeling, nonlinear and robust control of DC/DC switching converters
- PhD. in Electrical Engineering, Osaka University, Japan (2002 - 2004)
  - Thesis title: Decentralized robust load-frequency control synthesis in restructured power systems

== Professional engagements ==
Throughout his career, Bevrani has collaborated with various international institutions including:

- Osaka University, Japan
- Kumamoto University, Japan
- Queensland University of Technology, Australia
- Kyushu Institute of Technology, Japan
- Centrale Lille, France
- Technische Universität Berlin, Germany

== Publications ==
Bevrani has made significant contributions to the field with:

- 5 international books, including the followings:
  - "Robust power system frequency control", Springer, 2009 and
  - "Microgrid dynamics and control", Wiley, 2017
- 15 book chapters
- Over 250 journal and conference papers

== Awards and memberships ==
- Fellow member of IEEE
- Citations: 12,729
- h-index: 46
- i10-index: 130

== Research interests ==
His primary research areas encompass:

- Microgrid dynamics and control
- Smart grid operation and control
- Power system stability
- Intelligent/robust control applications in power electric industry

== Courses taught ==
- Pulse Techniques
- Microelectronic Circuits
- Power Electronics
- English for Electrical Engineers
- Linear Control Systems
- Electric circuits
