= Nicolas Walter =

British anarchist and atheist activist

- Born: Nicolas Hardy Walter; 22 November 1934; South London, England
- Died: 7 March 2000 (aged 65); Milton Keynes, England
- Education: Rendcomb College; Exeter College, Oxford
- Occupations: Writer; Journalist
- Movement: Anarchism; Anti-war; Humanism
- Spouses: Ruth Oppenheim (m. 1962; div. 1982) Christine Morris (m. 1987)
- Children: 2, including Natasha Walter
- Father: William Grey Walter
- Relatives: Samuel Kerkham Ratcliffe (grandfather)

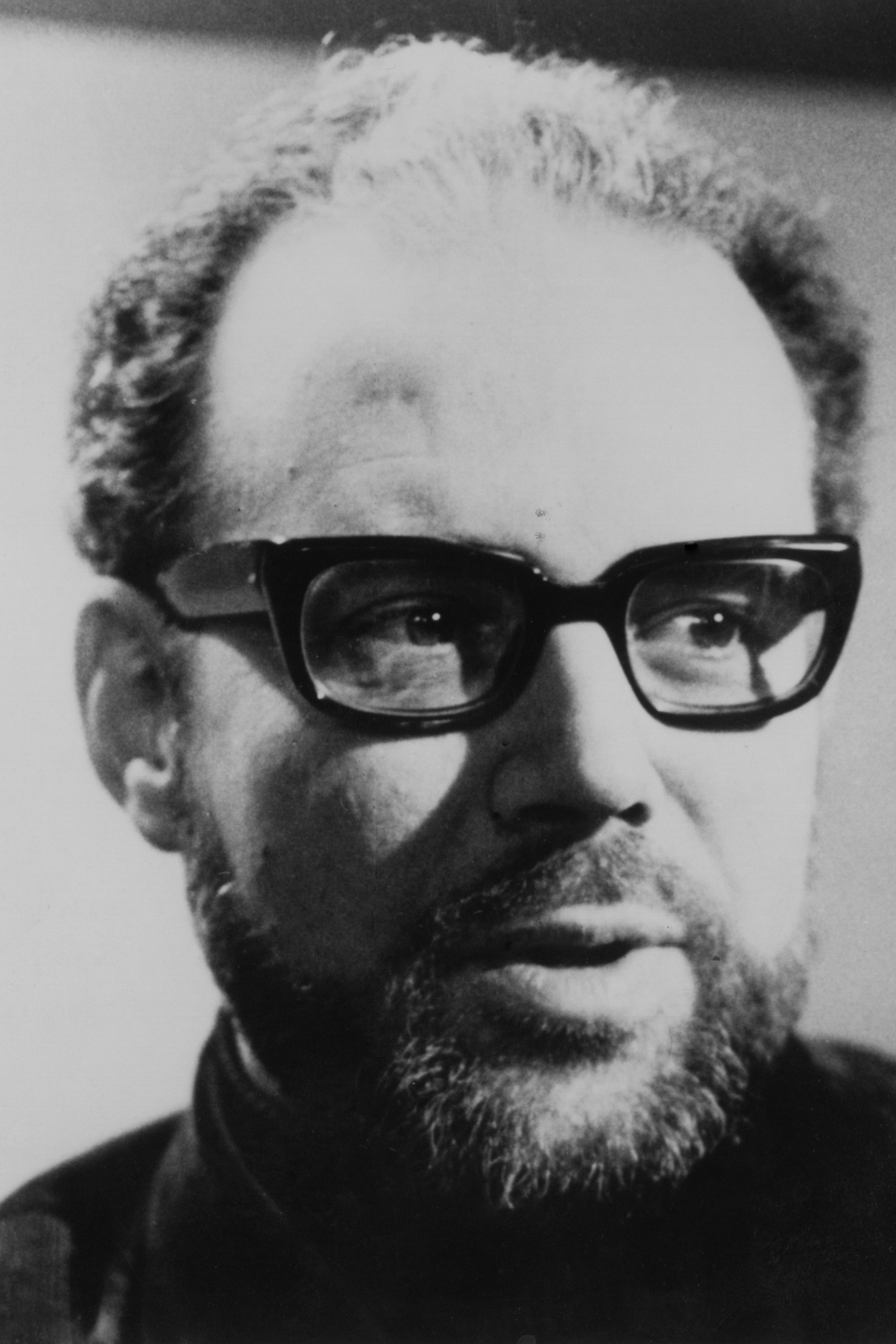
Nicolas Walter (Commons)

Nicolas Hardy Walter (22 November 1934 – 7 March 2000) was a British anarchist and atheist writer, speaker and activist. He was a member of the Committee of 100 and Spies for Peace, and wrote on topics of anarchism and humanism.

== Background ==
Nicolas was the son of Katherine Monica (née Ratcliffe) and William Grey Walter, an American-born British neurophysiologist, cybernetician and robotician. His paternal grandfather was Karl Walter (1880-1965), a journalist, writer and translator who worked for the Kansas City Star and the Horace Plunkett Foundation. Karl married an American woman called Margaret Hardy and lived in the US from 1908 until the outbreak of the First World War. His maternal grandfather was Samuel Kerkham Ratcliffe (1868-1958), a former member of the executive of the Fabian Society. After his parents divorced in 1945, his mother Monica (1911-2012) subsequently married a Cambridge University scientist Arnold Beck with whom she brought up Nicolas.

Walter attended Rendcomb College, Cirencester. He served two years National Service in the Royal Air Force, where he learned Russian prior to working in Signals Intelligence, and then read modern history at Exeter College, Oxford. At this time he joined the Labour Party.

Alongside his work for media associated with the causes that became his personal mission, as a working journalist Walter held editorial roles at Which? and The Times Literary Supplement before working as press officer for the British Standards Institution.

== Peace movement activism ==
Walter was heavily involved in the peace movement, being a founder member of the Committee of 100. Walter married Ruth Oppenheim, another member of the Committee of 100 in 1962, who was the daughter of refugees from Nazi Germany. The couple had two children, Susannah (born 1965) and Natasha Walter (born 1967), but divorced in 1982.

Walter was a member of Spies for Peace, which only became known after he died, along with Ruth, who was happy to be publicly identified by Natasha Walter in 2013. In March 1963, the group broke into regional seat of government No. 6 (RSG-6), copied documents relating to the government's plans in the event of nuclear war and distributed 3,000 leaflets revealing their contents.

In 1966, Walter was imprisoned for two months under the Ecclesiastical Courts Jurisdiction Act 1860, after a protest against British support for the Vietnam War. As Prime Minister Harold Wilson read the lesson (on the subject of beating swords into ploughshares) at a Labour Party service at the Methodist Church in Brighton, Walter and friends interrupted by shouting "Hypocrite!"

== Anarchism ==
Walter's book About Anarchism was first published in 1969. It went through many editions and has been translated into many languages. A revised edition was published in 2002, with a foreword by his daughter, the journalist and feminist writer Natasha Walter.

Walter had a long association with Freedom Press and was a regular contributor to Freedom among other publications. The last writing he did appeared in Freedom.

A collection of his writings from Freedom and elsewhere was published in 2007 as The Anarchist Past and Other Essays, edited by David Goodway.

== Rationalism, humanism and secularism ==
Walter was appointed Managing Editor of the Rationalist Press Association in 1975, but his progressive disability and the fact he was not, as Bill Cooke puts it, "a born administrator" led to difficulties.

He was a prominent member of the South Place Ethical Society and became one of its Appointed Lecturers in 1978. He resigned from this position in 1979 following a special meeting of the Society to consider a paper by Albert Lovecy and vote on the motion "that the Society has no theistic creed and does not practise worship". Peter Cadogan managed to have the motion amended to "does not practise worship of a deity" and it was passed. Walter remarked "many people ... have joined the society as part of their rejection of religion".

Walter was editor of the Rationalist Press Association's magazine New Humanist from February 1975 until July 1984, when Jim Herrick took over.

In 1989, in the aftermath of the fatwa on Salman Rushdie and his book The Satanic Verses, Walter (along with William McIlroy) re-formed The Committee Against Blasphemy Law. It issued a Statement Against Blasphemy Law, signed by more than 200 public figures. Walter and Barbara Smoker were attacked while counter-demonstrating during a Muslim protest against the book in May 1989. Walter's book Blasphemy Ancient and Modern put the Rushdie controversy into historical context.

Walter also served as company secretary of G. W. Foote & Co., publishers of The Freethinker, and was a vice-president of the National Secular Society.

Walter occasionally wrote or spoke about how secular humanists might face death – he had done so himself. In a letter to The Guardian in 1993 (16 September, p. 23) he explained:

All of us will die, and most of us will suffer before we do so. "The last act is bloody, however fine the rest of the play may be," said Pascal. Raging against the dying of the light may be good art, but is bad advice. "Why me?" may be a natural question, but it prompts a natural answer: "Why not?" Religion may promise life everlasting, but we should grow up and accept that life has an end as well as a beginning.

== Publications ==
- Humanism: What's in the Word (1997). London: Rationalist Press Association, ISBN 0-301-97001-7. Also published as Humanism: Finding Meaning in the Word by Prometheus Books, 1998, ISBN 1-57392-209-9.
- Blasphemy, Ancient and Modern (1990). London: Rationalist Press Association, ISBN 0-301-90001-9.
- About Anarchism (1969). London: Freedom Press. Updated edition published by Freedom Press in 2002, ISBN 0-900384-90-5.
- Nonviolent Resistance: Men Against War (London: Nonviolence 63, Schools for Non-Violence, 1963).
