= Charles Albert Watts =

English secularist editor and publisher

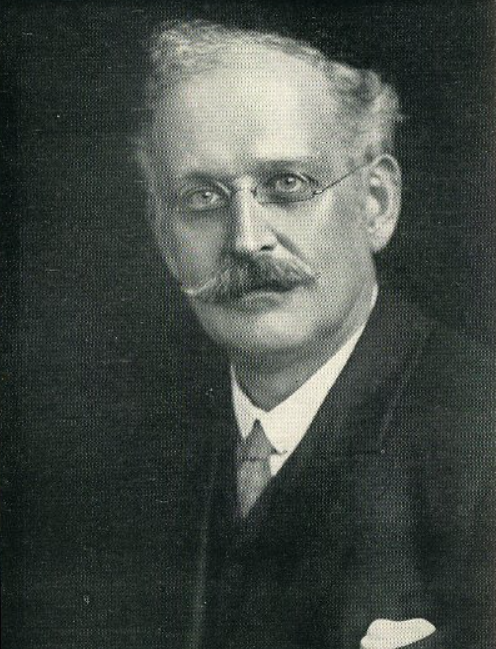
- Born: 27 May 1858; London, England
- Died: 15 May 1946 (aged 87); England
- Occupation(s): Editor, publisher
- Notable credit(s): Founder of Watts's Literary Guide (later New Humanist), and the Rationalist Press Association
- Relatives: Charles Watts (father)

Charles Albert Watts (27 May 1858 – 15 May 1946) was an English secularist editor and publisher. He founded the journal Watts's Literary Guide, which later became the New Humanist magazine, and the Rationalist Press Association. His father Charles Watts was also a prominent secularist writer. Father and son are sometimes confused with each other, and Charles Albert Watts is sometimes referred to as C. A. Watts or Charles Watts Jr.

== Life and career ==
Charles Albert Watts was the son of Charles Watts and his first wife Mary Ann Watts, and was the nephew of John Watts, all of whom were active in the rationalist and secularist movement in London, based around Charles Bradlaugh. John and Charles Watts both edited the National Reformer, and founded a radical publishing house, Watts & Co., in London in 1864. Charles Watts co-founded the National Secular Society in 1866, and became a leading spokesman for the group after his brother's death, but broke with Bradlaugh in 1877 and, in 1883, emigrated to Toronto, Ontario, Canada, leaving his son Charles Albert to run his publishing house and continue his editorial work.

In November 1885, the younger Watts established a journal, Watts's Literary Guide. In the first issue, which sold for one penny, the then-anonymous editor set out his ambition to fill it with "literary gossip" of interest to freethinkers, together with recording "the best liberal publications in this country". It also contained details of his father's speaking tours of Canada and the US, and regular criticisms of the Christian establishment on every front, from science and metaphysics to history and poetry. Soon afterwards, he also organised the Propagandist Press Committee, which later became the Rationalist Press Association. This provided him with a large group of subscribers, and enabled him to expand the magazine in size and with a widening readership. The name was changed to The Literary Guide in 1894.

C. A. Watts himself remained anonymous. He was described as "...decisive but self-effacing. He encouraged controversy in his pages, though he shrank from it himself." He did not allow his own name to appear in the magazine until his sixtieth birthday, in 1918. He edited the regular journal for over 60 years until his death, writing editorial content himself and drawing on contributors from a wide range of disciplines, including Annie Besant, Walt Whitman, and H. G. Wells.

He also expanded the work of his business, C. A. Watts & Co., into publishing books, including a series of "cheap reprints" which made the works of such writers as Charles Darwin, Thomas Huxley and John Stuart Mill available to a mass audience, at only sixpence a volume. This later became the Thinker's Library, a series of 140 small books published between 1929 and 1951. They included essays, literature, and extracts from works by various classical and contemporary humanists and rationalists.

Charles Albert Watts died in 1946 at the age of 87. The magazine was later renamed The Humanist, and then New Humanist.
