= James A. C. Brown =

Scottish psychiatrist

- Born: 1911
- Died: 1965 (aged 53–54)
- Education: University of Edinburgh
- Scientific career
- Fields: Psychiatry

James Alexander Campbell Brown (1911–1965) was a psychiatrist who was born in Edinburgh, Scotland.

== Career ==
Brown took a degree in medicine at the University of Edinburgh. Later, he traveled to mainland Europe where he studied in many countries.

During the Second World War, Brown was a specialist in psychiatry in the Middle East. He practiced psychiatry in the army, but also gained experience in mental hospitals, prisons and selection boards. Later, he became interested in the normal individual's adjustment to society. Brown joined a large industrial concern after the war, where he worked for seven years.

Even though Brown was educated in a school of thought which considered mental illness mainly as an individual and biological problem, he later regarded it basically as a social one. He took the view that the mental conflicts of the neurotic are in large part induced by the sick society in which he or she lives. Thus, Brown argued that the efficiency of industry cannot be weighed solely in terms of the amount goods it produces or its financial profits, but also by considering the cost of human health and happiness the goods were produced. He expressed this view in his work The Social Psychology of Industry (1954).

== Works ==
- The Social Psychology of Industry. Pelican Books, Vol.296. Penguin Books, Harmondsworth (Middlesex) 1954. https://doi.org/10.1037/14347-000
- Techniques of Persuasion. From propaganda to brainwashing. Pelican Books, Vol.604. Penguin Books, Harmondsworth (Middlesex) 1963. p.325
- The Distressed Mind. The thinker's library, Vol.115. Watts & Co., London 1946. p.154
- The Evolution of Society. The thinker's library, Vol.122. Watts & Co., London 1947. p.184
- Freud and the Post-Freudians. Pelican Books. Penguin Books, Harmondsworth (Middlesex) 1961.
