= Johan H. Enslin =

- Born: South Africa
- Occupation: Professor
- Known for: Fellow of the Institute of Electrical and Electronics Engineers; Duke Energy Endowed Chaired Professor in Smart Grid at Clemson University

Johan H. Enslin is a scientist in the field of electrical engineering, and a Fellow of the Institute of Electrical and Electronics Engineers (IEEE). He has been named as a fellow member for his contributions to integration of renewable energy into power networks and using power electronics. He serves as the president of the IEEE Power Electronics Society (PELS) for the period 2025-2026. Enslin, the Duke Energy Endowed Chair in Smart Grid Technology at Clemson University, has taken on a new role as a program director for the U.S. Department of Energy’s Advanced Research Projects Agency–Energy (ARPA-E), beginning his term in January 2024.

Johan Enslin previously held the position of Director at the Energy Production and Infrastructure Center (EPIC) and was the Duke Energy Distinguished Chaired Professor in Power Systems at UNC Charlotte. With a career spanning 40 years, Enslin has been a leader in both academia and industry across the US, Europe, and South Africa. He has served as an executive for private businesses and as a professor of electrical engineering, initiating and leading renewable energy teams, companies, and multi-disciplinary power system projects. Throughout his career, Enslin has worked with over 80 power utilities, governments, and industries in the US, Europe, Asia, and Africa. He is a prolific author, having written over 350 technical papers for IEEE and other organizations, as well as contributing to scientific books. Enslin is a lifelong leader in the IEEE and CIGRÉ working groups and committees, and holds more than 25 provisional and final patents. He has received several awards and is a registered Professional Engineer in South Africa, as well as a Fellow of the SAIEE and Fellow of the IEEE. Enslin currently serves on the scientific advisory boards for several companies, non-profit organizations, and university centers, and is an Emeritus Director on the E4 Carolinas Board. In 2014, he was awarded the Charlotte Business Journal Energy Leadership Award and graduated from the Leadership North Carolina (LNC), Class XXII.

== Education ==
Johan received the B.S. degree in 1981, the M.S. degree in 1983, and the Ph.D. degree in 1988, all from Rand Afrikaans University, South Africa.

== Career ==
He is currently a Duke Energy Endowed Chaired Professor in Smart Grid at Clemson University.

== See also ==
- Sukumar Brahma
- Mohammad Shahidehpour
- Hassan Bevrani
