= Sukumar Brahma =

- Born: India
- Occupation: Professor
- Known for: Fellow of the Institute of Electrical and Electronics Engineers; Dominion Energy Distinguished Professor in power engineering

Sukumar Brahma is a scientist in the field of electrical engineering, and a Fellow of the Institute of Electrical and Electronics Engineers (IEEE). He has been named as a fellow member for his contributions to power system protection with distributed and renewable generation.

== Education ==
Sukumar received the B.E. degree from Gujarat University in 1989, the M.Tech. degree from The Indian Institute of Technology Bombay, Mumbai, India in 1997, and the Ph.D. degree from Clemson University, Clemson, SC, USA, in 2003.

== Career ==
He is currently a Dominion Energy Distinguished Professor in power engineering and the Director of Clemson University Electric Power Research Association, Clemson University.

== See also ==
- Johan H. Enslin
- Mohammad Shahidehpour
