= Irreligion in the United Kingdom =

Total population
- United Kingdom: 25,273,945 – 37.8% (2021); England: 20,715,664 – 36.7% (2021); Scotland: 2,780,900 – 51.1% (2022); Wales: 1,446,398 – 46.5% (2021); Northern Ireland: 330,983 – 17.4% (2021) (Note: Includes No Religion, Jedi Knight, Agnostic, Atheist, Humanist, Free Thinker and 'No religion: Other')

Religions
- Irreligion: (including atheism, agnosticism, etc.); Note

Religion in England and Wales (2021 census)
1. Christian (46.2%)
2. No religion (37.2%)
3. Muslim (6.50%)
4. Hindu (1.70%)
5. Sikh (0.90%)
6. Buddhist (0.50%)
7. Jewish (0.50%)
8. Other religions (0.60%)
9. Not stated (5.99%)

Irreligion in the United Kingdom has a history going back to approximately the 1700s, when the rejection of Christianity was first developed as a philosophical position. Irreligion is more prevalent in the UK than in other parts of Europe, with the term "secularism" first used in the mid-19th century. In 2021 the United Kingdom census showed less than half of the population declared themselves to be Christians in England and Wales, with those identifying as having "no religion" being the fastest-growing group. This has led to British institutions and legislative structures being criticised as increasingly unrepresentative of what is becoming a largely non-religious population.

== 1700–1850 ==
Organised activism for irreligion in the United Kingdom derived its roots from the legacy of British nonconformists. The South Place Religious Society, which would later become associated with the Ethical movement, was founded in 1793.

One of earliest open avowals of irreligion in England was The Necessity of Atheism, published by Percy Bysshe Shelley, then a young Oxford student in 1811. This followed a pamphlet published nearly 30 years earlier by a physician named Matthew Turner, entitled Answer to Dr. Priestley’s Letters to a Philosophical Unbeliever, thought to be the first of its kind, and followed by other works in which Turner developed his critique of belief in God.

The Oracle of Reason, the first avowedly atheist periodical publication in British history, was published from 1841 to 1843 by Charles Southwell. It suffered from numerous imprisonments of its staff, including Southwell, George Holyoake and Thomas Paterson, for missives deemed "blasphemous" by the authorities (Holyoake was the last person in Britain convicted of blasphemy in a public lecture). Holyoake took to publishing The Movement (1842–1845) following his six-month sentence, which later became The Reasoner (1845–1860) and shifted to a larger focus on social issues facing the British working class, increasing the publication's readership. It was during this time that Holyoake developed his idea for the replacement of Christianity with an ethical system based upon science and reason, terming his proposal "secularism".

== 1850–1900 ==
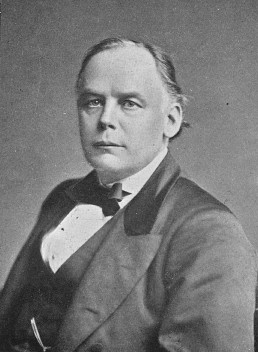
Charles Bradlaugh, Member of Parliament for Northampton and founder of the National Secular Society in 1866.

George Holyoake's coining of the word secularism in 1851 offered the English-speaking world the clarification of the nascent movement for separation of religion and state. The National Secular Society, founded in 1866 by the politician Charles Bradlaugh, spearheaded the advocacy for freeing citizens from absolute government requirements involving religious observances; the Leicester Secular Society was founded in 1851. Bradlaugh's 1880 election to Parliament brought on a decade-long dispute over the demanded right to affirm declarations of office rather than swear oaths, as he was denied his seat for five years by a ruling that he had no right to affirm and resolutions preventing him from swearing an oath. When Bradlaugh was ultimately admitted in 1886, he took up the issue and saw the Oaths Act 1888 passed, which confirmed the right to optionally affirm declarations for inaugurations to office and offering testimony to government bodies.

In 1881, The Freethinker began circulation as Britain's longest-running humanist periodical. In 1896, the Union of Ethical Societies was formed in the United Kingdom by American Stanton Coit as a union of pre-existing British Ethical movement societies; this group would later become known as the Ethical Union and the British Humanist Association. In 1899, the Rational Press Association was formed by a group of free-thinkers including Charles Albert Watts and George Holyoake.

Meanwhile, the South Place Religious Society became further aligned with organised secularist advocacy during the tenure of Moncure D. Conway as minister of the congregation; Conway, an American Unitarian minister who served from 1864 to 1885 and 1892–1897, moved the congregation further away from doctrinal Unitarianism, and spent the break in his tenure (during which Stanton Coit served in his stead) writing a biography of American revolutionary ideologue Thomas Paine. In 1888, the South Place Religious Society became the South Place Ethical Society, now known as the Conway Hall Ethical Society.

== 20th century ==
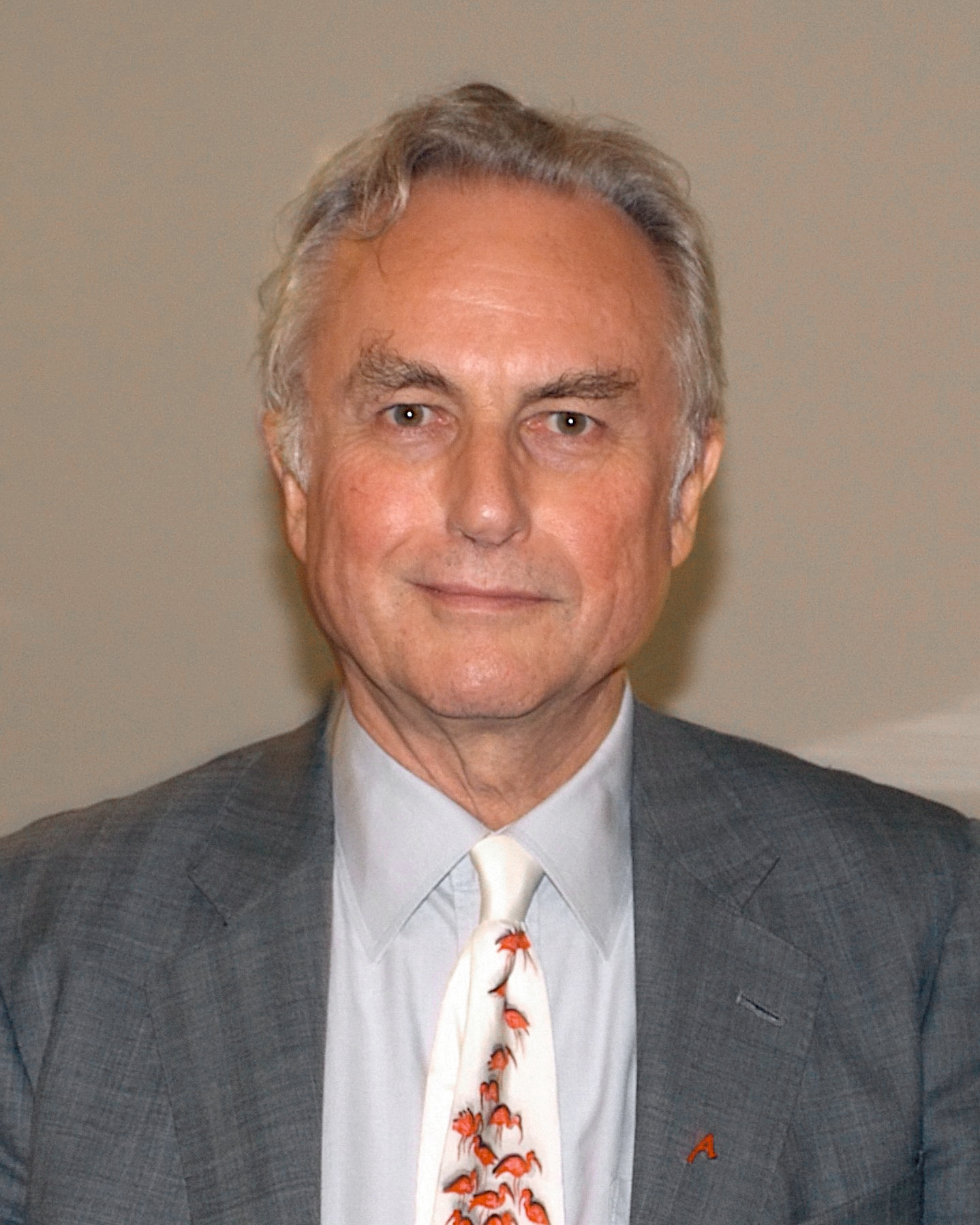
Richard Dawkins has been a significant figure in irreligion since the 1970s.

The 1960s were a significant time for irreligion, as the Ethical Union rebranded as the British Humanist Association, which went on to co-found the International Humanist and Ethical Union and create a symbol for humanism, the Happy Human. Broadcasters such as Margaret K. Knight sensationalised Britain with open advocacy of non-religious values and secular education. Senior figures in the British humanist movement went out to take on leading roles in institutions such as UNESCO, the World Health Organization, and the Food and Agriculture Organization.

John William Gott, a working man of Bradford, West Yorkshire, attacked religion, especially Christianity, seeing it as reducing the opportunity for a socialist revolution. His lectures on rationalism and scepticism, and anti-Christian pamphlets, saw him jailed for blasphemy in 1911. Liberal Prime Minister H. H. Asquith was one of a group of Members of Parliament who proposed an ultimately unsuccessful piece of legislation to abolish blasphemy offences. Gott was jailed again ten years later for a pamphlet showing Jesus as a clown, and died in 1922 soon after his nine-month sentence which included hard labour despite his worsening physical condition. There was a public backlash against his sentence. Gott was the last Briton jailed for blasphemy. The offence remained a technical crime through common law, until being abolished in the Criminal Justice and Immigration Act 2008.

Evolutionary biologist Richard Dawkins, who first came to prominence in 1976 following the release of The Selfish Gene, increasingly figured in British irreligion with the release of his 1986 work The Blind Watchmaker, in which he argued in favour of evolutionary natural selection as opposed to intelligent design and creationism.

== 21st century ==
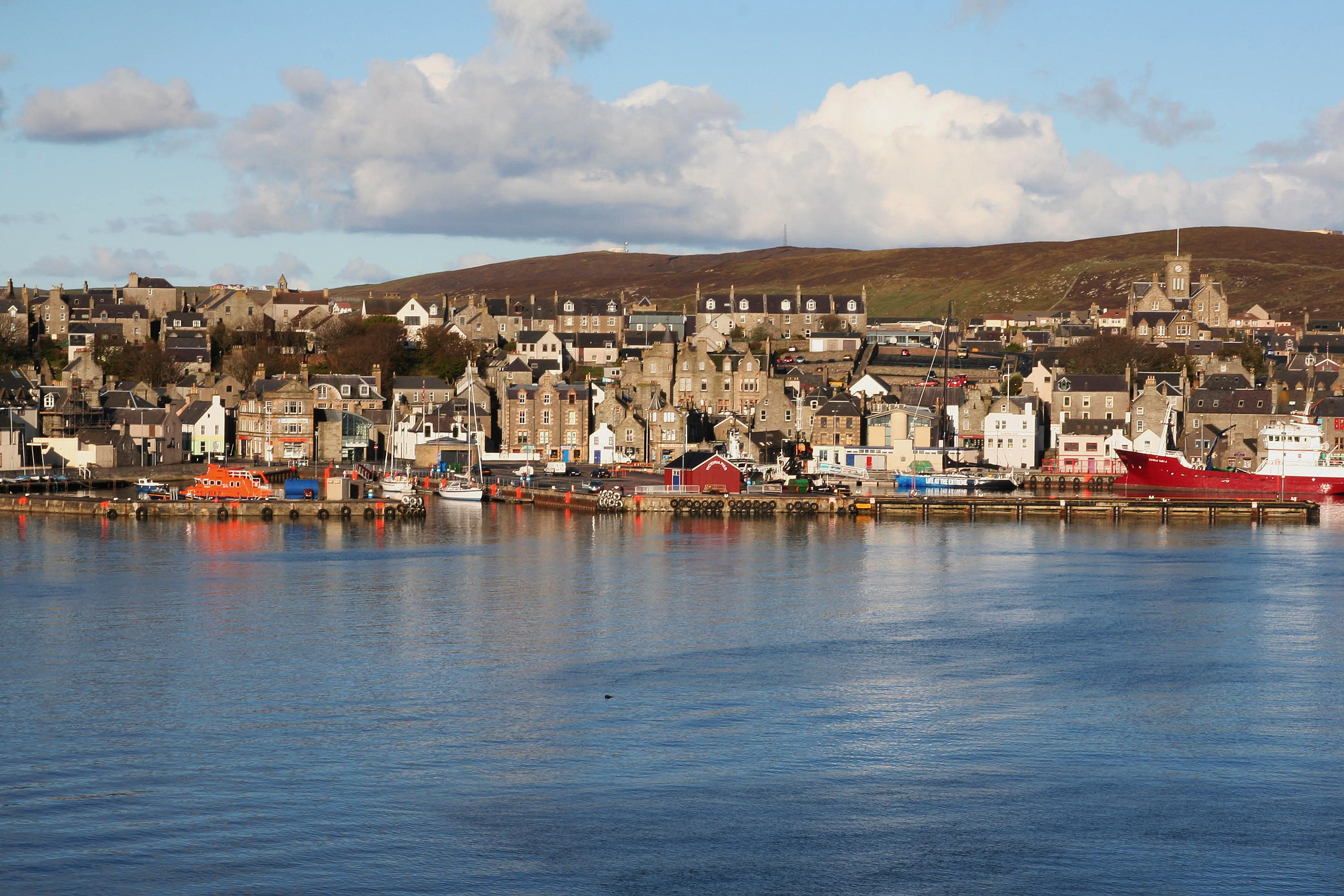
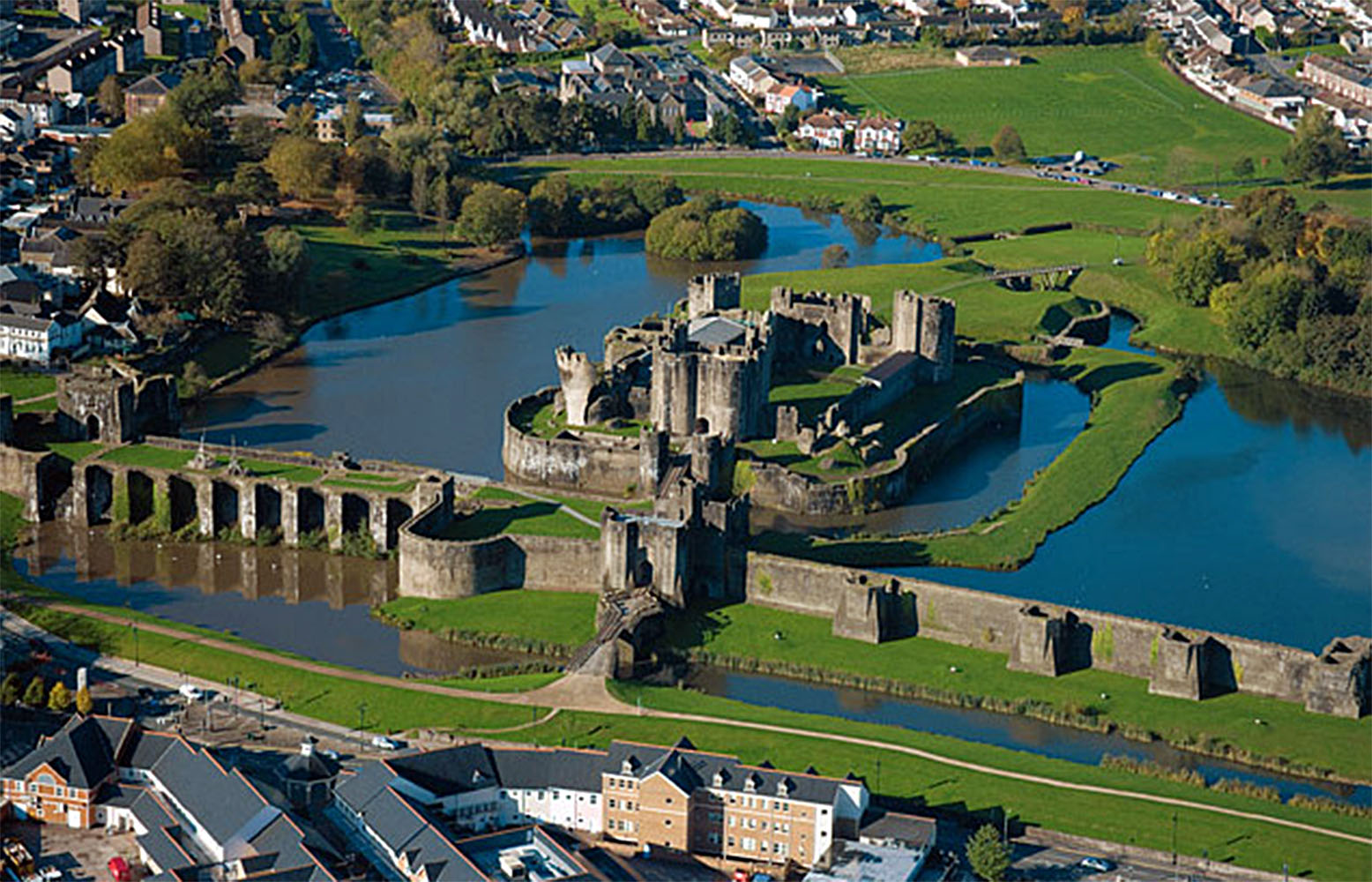
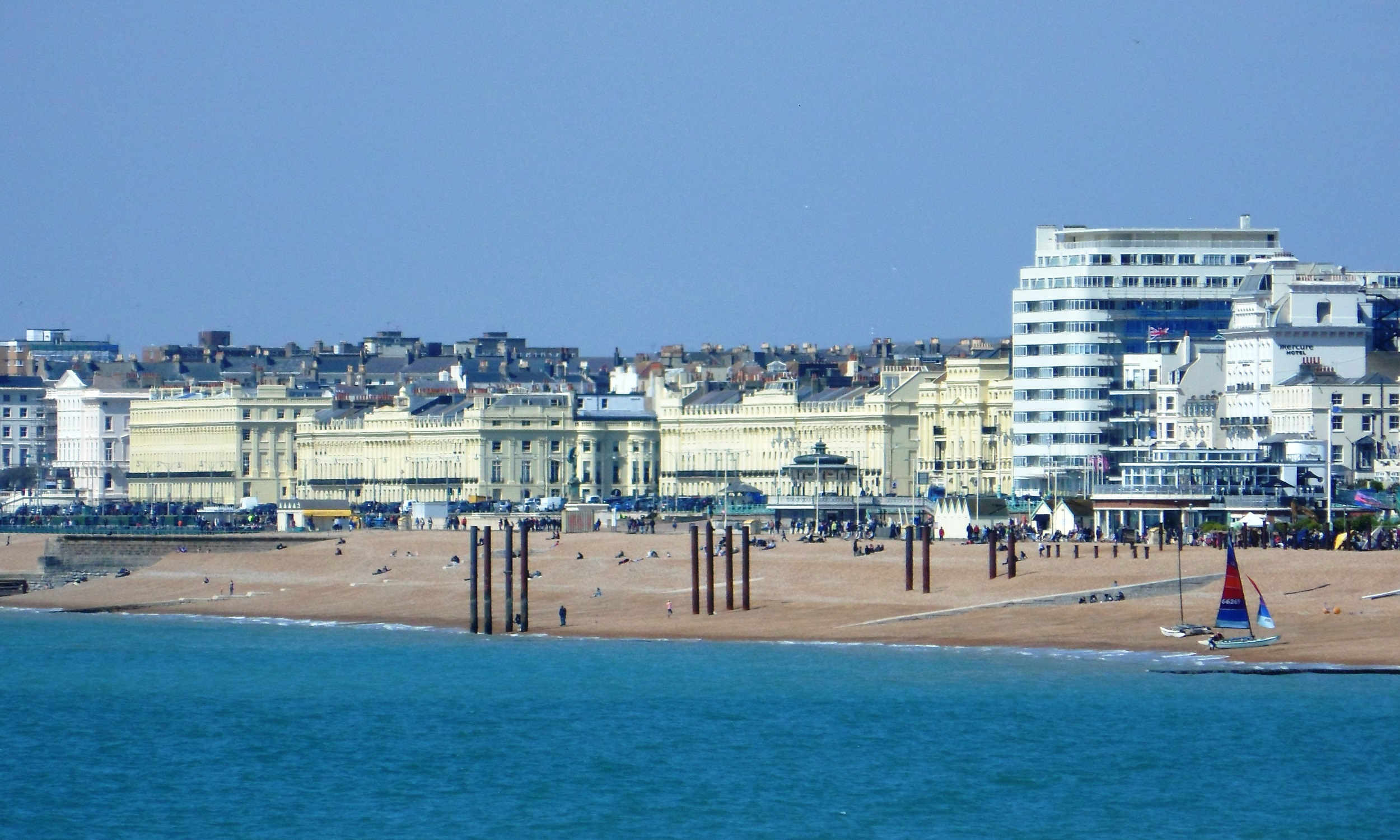
The most irreligious local authority from each country of Great Britain. In descending order, Shetland Islands (62.8%) in Scotland; Caerphilly (56.7%) in Wales; and Brighton and Hove (53.5%) in England.

In the 21st century, New Atheism became a popular topic of debate, support and critique in the United Kingdom. Dawkins' 2006 book The God Delusion and Christopher Hitchens' 2007 book God Is Not Great were considered emblematic works of the era among British authors, and Dawkins advocated for the Brights movement. The Atheist Bus Campaign was inaugurated during this time, in which advertisements on double-decker buses were purchased by the British Humanist Association in order to advocate non-belief in the supernatural; the campaign caused controversy and complaints to authorities, but soon spread to other countries and continents, taking root in the United States as a variety of atheist billboard campaigns.

== Current statistics ==
Although questions on religion were not present in the UK national census until 2001, irreligion in the United Kingdom has been increasing, with Christianity perceived to be on the decline. Mori Polls have shown that British Christians support a secular state, while Britons are amongst the most sceptical in the world about religion. Irreligion is also more prevalent than in some parts of Europe.

Official statistics published in 2019 put the number of people saying they have "no religion" at 39% of the population, an increase of 46% since 2011, with over 8 million more people declaring that they did not belong to any religious group. The figures also showed a 14% decline (from 59.3% to 51%) in the number of people identifying as Christian. According to Humanists UK, the 2018 British Social Attitudes Survey (BSAS) reported around 52% of the UK population was non-religious. The results of the 2021 United Kingdom census showed less than half of the population (46.2%, 27.5 million people) declared themselves to be Christians in England and Wales, a 13.1 percentage point decrease from 2011. The number of those identifying as having no religion became the second most common response, increasing by 12.0 percentage points to 37.2% (22.2 million) from 25.2% (14.1 million) in 2011. The equivalent census for Scotland in 2022 recorded no-religion as a majority (51.1%) of the population.

Aside from affiliation with organised religion, a large majority of Britons do not believe in a God or gods, an afterlife, or attend religious services. An international study by Pew Research Centre in 2018 discovered that when grouping all non-Muslims, 36% in the United Kingdom did not believe in God. 27% of Britons believed in a "a god" in 2020, with 16% believing in another form of higher power.

Around 5% of all adults in 2024 and 2025 attended Churches weekly, which was 8% in 2018 in years before the COVID-19 pandemic.

Religion has also been shown to have the least influence on youth. A 2009 survey of 1,000 teenagers aged 13 to 18 reports that two-thirds of British teenagers do not believe in God. Even among those identifying as Anglicans polled in a 2013 survey doubted the existence of God.

=== In representative democracy ===
British institutions and legislative structures have been criticised as being increasingly unrepresentative of what is becoming a largely non-religious population. The All-Party Parliamentary Humanist Group meets to discuss and share information on matters of interest relating humanism. In 2024, the UK elected its least religious Parliament, with 40% of new MPs choosing to make a secular affirmation rather than swear a religious oath, up from 24% in 2019. This included 50% of the new Cabinet and the new Prime Minister. Analysis showed this was because of the greatly increased intake of Labour and Liberal Democrat MPs, who were younger and less religious than the Conservative MPs they replaced. While some religious MPs take the affirmation for religious or other reasons, commentators noticed that this was likely outnumbered by self-declared atheist MPs who took the more traditional oath.

== Demographics ==
Historical population
Year	Pop.	±%
2001	9,103,727 (Note: Figures are for Great Britain only, i.e. excludes Northern Ireland. The census for Northern Ireland combined results for 'No Religion' and 'Religion not stated' together.)	—
2011	16,221,509	+78.2%
2021	25,273,945	+55.8%
Religious Affiliation was not recorded in the census prior to 2001. Source: Office for National Statistics

=== Geographical distribution ===
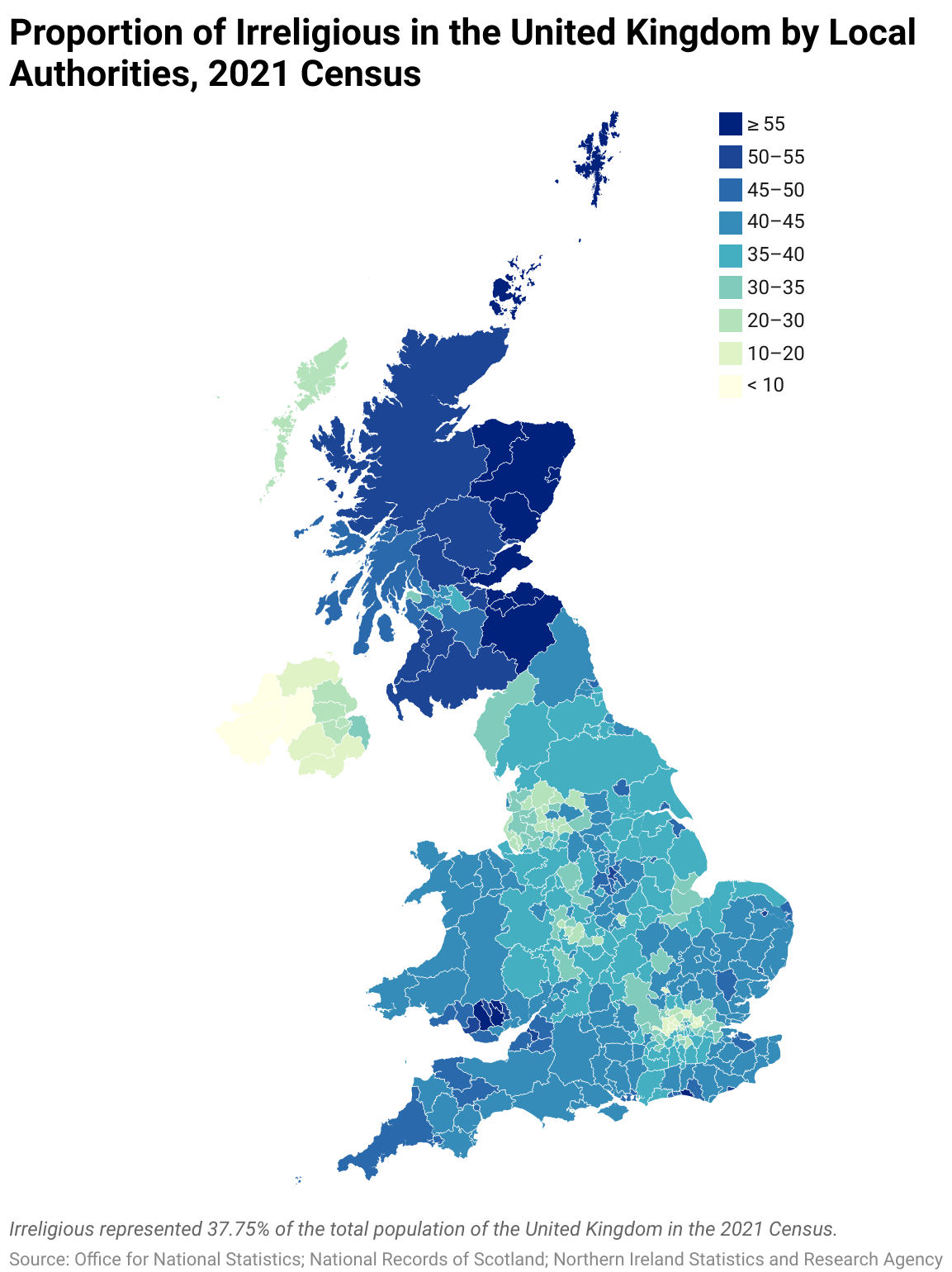
Distribution of Irreligious by local authority, 2021 census

Irreligious in the United Kingdom by region and country
Region / Country	2021 (Note: 2021/22: England and Wales, Northern Ireland, and Scotland)		2011 (Note: 2011: England and Wales, Northern Ireland, and Scotland)		2001 (Note: 2001: England and Wales, Northern Ireland and Scotland)	
Region / Country	Number	%	Number	%	Number	%
England	20,715,664	36.7%	13,114,232	24.7%	7,171,332	14.6%
—South East	3,733,094	40.2%	2,388,286	27.7%	1,319,979	16.5%
—East	2,544,509	40.2%	1,631,572	27.9%	902,145	16.7%
—South West	2,513,369	44.1%	1,549,201	29.3%	825,461	16.7%
—North West	2,419,624	32.6%	1,397,916	19.8%	705,045	10.5%
—Greater London	2,380,404	27.1%	1,694,372	20.7%	1,130,616	15.8%
—Yorkshire and the Humber	2,161,185	39.4%	1,366,219	25.9%	699,327	14.1%
—West Midlands	1,955,003	32.9%	1,230,910	22.0%	647,718	12.3%
—East Midlands	1,950,354	40.0%	1,248,056	27.5%	664,845	15.9%
—North East	1,058,122	40.0%	607,700	23.4%	276,196	11.0%
Scotland	2,780,900 (Note: Scotland held its census a year later after the rest of the United Kingdom due to the COVID-19 pandemic. As a result, data shown is for 2022 as opposed to 2021.)	51.1%	1,941,116	36.7%	1,394,460	27.6%
Wales	1,446,398	46.5%	982,997	32.1%	537,935	18.5%
Northern Ireland	330,983	17.4%	183,164	10.1%	—N/a	—N/a
United Kingdom	25,273,945	37.8%	16,221,509	25.7%	9,103,727	15.9%

The five local authorities with the largest proportion of those who identified as holding no religious beliefs were all located in Scotland: Shetland Islands (62.75%), Fife (60.55%), Midlothian (60.54%), Aberdeenshire (58.96%) and Clackmannanshire (58.33%). In Wales, the highest proportion was in Caerphilly at 56.70%; in England, the highest proportion was in Brighton and Hove at 55.20%; and in Northern Ireland, the highest concentration was in Ards and North Down at 30.63%.

== See also ==
- Disestablishmentarianism
- Religion in the United Kingdom
