= Floris van den Berg =

Dutch religious philosopher

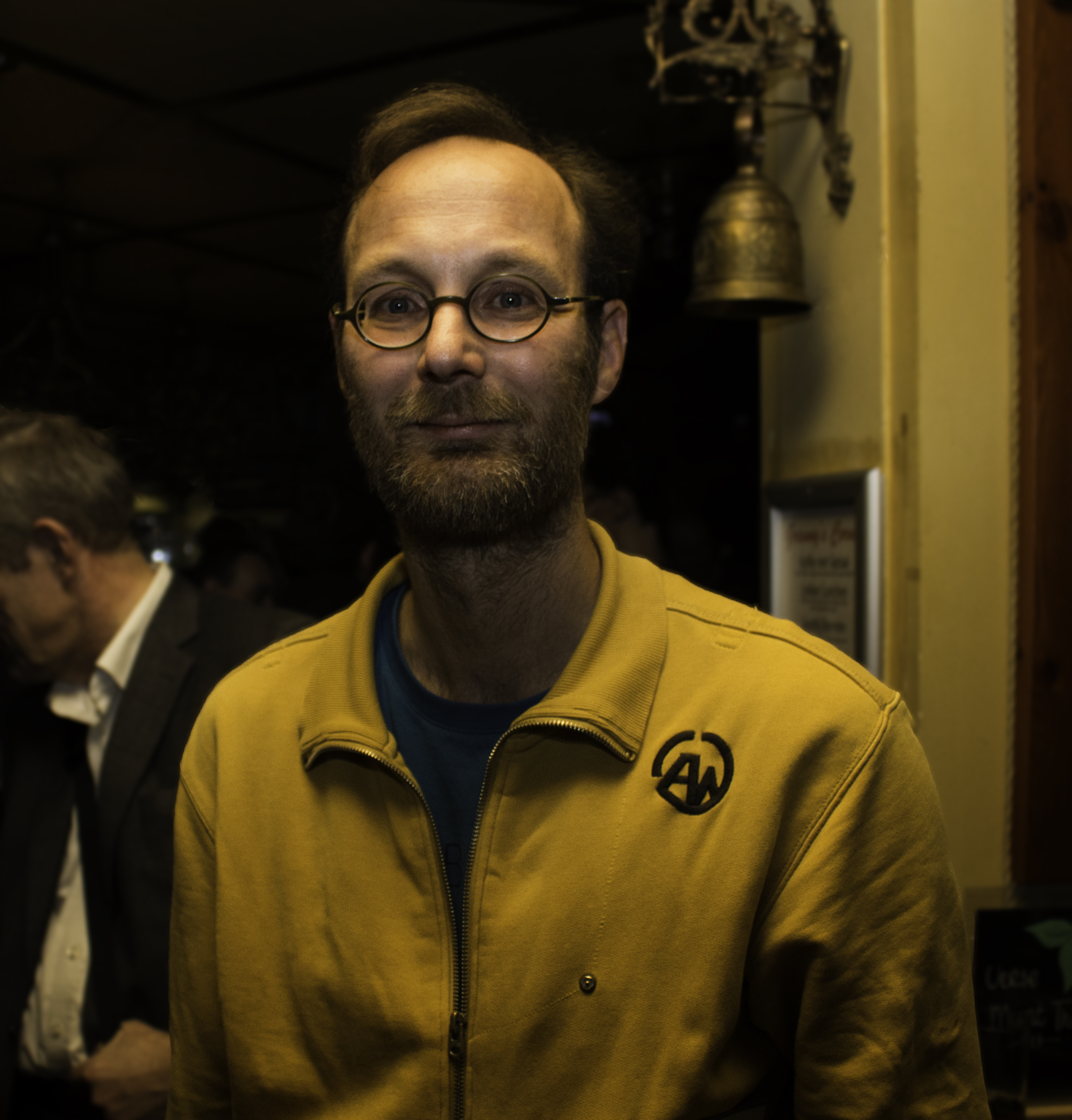
- Floris van den Berg, 2014
- Born: 4 February 1973 (age 53); Naarden, Gooi, Netherlands
- Occupations: philosopher, author

Floris van den Berg (born 4 February 1973) is a Dutch philosopher and author, mostly known for his atheism campaign in the Netherlands.

== Activities ==
Van den Berg was raised in a liberal Catholic home, but became an atheist activist as an adult.

Following the initiative of Ariane Sherine and Richard Dawkins for the Atheist Bus Campaign in the United Kingdom, which was taken up in several other European countries, Floris van den Berg announced the intention to launch a similar campaign in the Netherlands on 12 January 2009. Kees van der Staaij of the ultraconservative Protestant Reformed Political Party (SGP) asked parliamentary questions about the matter to Secretary of State of Transport Tineke Huizinga, and discussed the topic with Van den Berg on 28 January in Nova. However, the bus campaign was abandoned, because the major bus companies Connexxion, Arriva and Veolia do not allow messages of a political or religious nature.

In January 2017, Floris participated in the EO television series Rot op met je religie ("To Hell With Your Religion"), in which he lives together with two Christians, a Muslim, a Jew and a fellow atheist for two weeks. They go on a journey throughout the country to discover, discuss and critique religious ideas and rituals.

Floris is a vegan and an advocate of sentientism.

== Works ==
- Geleefde brieven / Deel I: Prometheus (2009). ISBN 9789067282260.
- Hoe komen we van religie af? (2009). ISBN 9789089180247.
- Filosofie voor een betere wereld (2009). ISBN 9789089240538.
- Harming others : universal subjectivism and the expanding moral circle, Dissertation, Leiden University 2011 (dissertation advisor Prof. dr. P. B. Cliteur).
- Geleefde brieven / Deel III: Ikaros (2012). ISBN 9789067282697.
- Philosophy for a Better World, Prometheus Books, (2013). ISBN 9781616145033.
- De vrolijke veganist – Ethiek in een veranderende wereld (2013). ISBN 9789089242655.
- Utopische Meditaties. Gedichten & gedachten (2014). ISBN 9789402205497
- Beter Weten (2015). ISBN 9789089243768.
- De vrolijke feminist (2016). ISBN 9789089242181.
