= Jon Worth =

Political blogger, journalist and editor

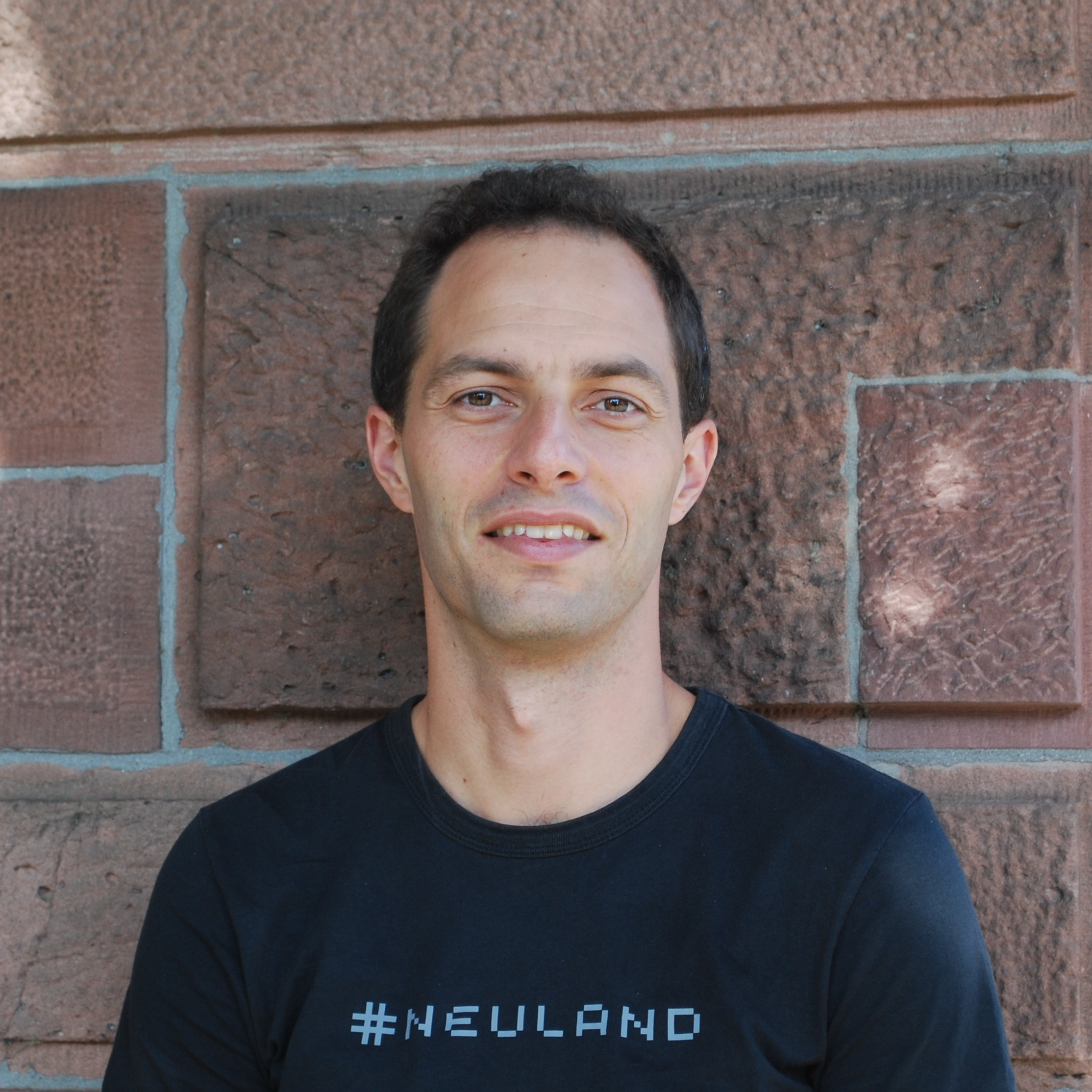
- Born: 23 May 1980 (age 46); Newport, Wales
- Education: Merton College
- Occupations: EU railway campaigner Blogger; Editor; Journalist
- Writing career
- Genre: Non-Fiction
- Subjects: Rail transport in Europe; Brexit; European Union; Germany
- Website: jonworth.eu

Jon Worth (born 23 May 1980) is an independent railway commentator and campaigner, political blogger, journalist, and editor who regularly writes about transport policy and EU railway policy, EU policy, Brexit and German domestic and foreign policy. He was a visiting professor at the College of Europe from 2015 to 2026 lecturing in political communications.

Worth studied Philosophy, Politics and Economics at Merton College, University of Oxford, where he obtained a BA. He also holds an MA in European Politics from the College of Europe, Bruges. Jon Worth's "Euroblog" started in 2005. It was ranked the third most influential left-of-center blog in 2010 by Social Europe.

== Transport advocacy ==
From 2021/2022, the focus of his work shifted increasingly towards transport policy and specifically policy on rail transport in Europe.

In 2021 he founded the public advocacy group Trains for Europe to advocate for more night trains across Europe.

In the summer of 2022, he started the #CrossBorderRail campaign drawing attention to issues within the European rail network, and specifically the border connections between countries. He has crossed every EU border to determine the ease-of-use of international rail systems, documenting findings, and detailing findings to the E.U. railways commissioner. He categorizes the problems with crossing borders via rail in different categories like infrastructure deficiency of just a scheduling conflict. He later moderated panel discussions with representatives from rail operators and governments covering cross border rail ticketing.

Worth claimed in 2023 that railway operators have focused on maximizing profit rather than increasing market share. He suggested running railways as a public service or increasing competition could improve market share.

Worth has frequently raised the environmental impact of aviation and pushed for more investment in rail.

In succession of #CrossBorderRail Worth analysed rail opportunities for connections to London via the rail channel tunnel in the #CrossChannelRail campaign.

In 2026 Worth was a founding member of the European Rail Passengers Union and he started a weekly newsletter on European railway news.

== Blogging ==
According to a 2010 survey by Waggener Edstrom, a Brussels-based consultancy, Worth's Euroblog was similar in influence to the BBC's Gavin Hewitt and the Financial Times' Brussels Blog in a survey attempting to identify key influential voices in online Brussels policy debates. His site has been described as one of the best known blogs about EU politics.

After the acquisition of Twitter by Elon Musk, Worth has moved to using Mastodon and Bluesky. He has criticized EU institutions still using commercial social media platforms and has described in an academic context how social media impacts EU politics.

== Professional career ==
Worth started his career as a civil servant in the UK in 2004 on the European Fast Stream scheme. In 2007 he left the civil service to become a web designer.

In his political work, he has mostly worked on the left in British politics. He was president of the NGO Young European Federalists Europe between 2003 and 2005. In British politics, he was responsible for the online campaign supporting Harriet Harman's 2007 bid for Labour Party Deputy Leader. Worth also ran online campaigning for Diane Abbott's Labour Leadership bid in 2010. He was one of the founders of the Atheist Bus Campaign in 2008, the campaign having first been visualized in his blog entry "In your face atheism?". In 2013, at the time of his move to Berlin, he left the Labour Party and joined the German Greens, where he ran in the 2016 local elections.

He was a visiting professor at the College of Europe in Bruges, where he had been teaching from 2015–16 academic year to 2025-26 academic year. He is a university lecturer in political communications. He taught students in the politics department about online communications in the EU and (together with Pierpaolo Settembri and Costanza Hermanin) ran a negotiation simulation.

He became significantly involved in advocacy and analysis of Brexit. As a UK citizen in Germany, he has regularly appeared in the German media to talk about Brexit. He documented Brexit in detail, creating more than 50 diagrams and 200 blog posts on the topic. From January to March 2019 he wrote 27 flowcharts documenting possible future eventualities. Officials in the British government liked his diagrams so much they printed them out and hung them on their walls. He cast a vote for Remain.

He is a member of the Europe Policy Group of the World Economic Forum and the Transparency International EU Advisory Group.
