= Atheist billboard =

An atheist billboard is an outdoor billboard that promotes divestment or outreach to atheists, nontheists, or nonreligious individuals. Similar to the Atheist Bus Campaign first undertaken in the United Kingdom by Ariane Sherine in October 2008, atheist billboards often include messages or graphics which either assert the lack of evidence for the existence of deities or positively encourage those who are privately questioning the existence of a deity (or the supernatural), and such advertisements have garnered controversy and negative reactions from local theists.

== United States ==
The earliest-documented atheist billboard was first posted by FreeThoughtAction and the American Humanist Association in January 2008 along Route 95 South in Ridgefield; the billboard stated "Don't believe in God? You are not alone" against a cloudy sky background. It was followed in June 2008 by another billboard (containing the same words and background) along Interstate 95 near the Allegheny Avenue exit which was funded by Steve Rade, a Huntingdon Valley businessman, and spearheaded (and underlined) by the Greater Philadelphia Coalition of Reason (PhillyCOR); a large batch of billboards with the same contents was posted in November 2008 by COCORE, an umbrella organization of atheists and secular humanists in Colorado, at 10 sites in Denver and one in Colorado Springs, with the payment for the campaign going to upwards of $5,000 for four weeks starting on November 17. By this time, local atheist groups were encouraged to spearhead the billboards by the Atheist Bus Campaign, which had been started in the United Kingdom and soon spread to other countries in which public transit constitutes a main means of both transportation and advertisement (for both businesses and religious movements).
