= Rot op met je religie =

- Genre: Reality show, religion
- Directed by: Pim Mookhoek, Nicolien Kool
- Presented by: Kefah Allush
- Country of origin: Netherlands
- Original language: Dutch
- No. of seasons: 1
- No. of episodes: 5

Production
- Producer: Tuvalu Media
- Production locations: Haarlem and elsewhere in the Netherlands
- Running time: 40 minutes
- Production company: EO

Original release
- Network: NPO 2
- Release: 16 January – 20 January 2017

Rot op met je religie (English: To Hell With Your Religion) is a 2017 Dutch television series by the Evangelische Omroep, presented by Kefah Allush.

== Setting and purpose ==
In this reality show, four religious people (two Christians, a Muslim and a Jew) and two atheists live together in the same house in Haarlem, and discuss and debate their religious beliefs, practices and traditions. It features mutual criticism of religion as well as interfaith dialogue. The participants also travel across the Netherlands to visit houses of worship, an abortion clinic and a halal slaughterhouse amongst other places, and cook together despite their widely varying ethical views on food.

The EO hopes the programme will show what 'religious stress' does to the candidates, and what effect this has on their beliefs. Just before the first episode was broadcast, the EO published a survey about religious stress amongst Dutch citizens, which showed amongst other things that 93% of the population is in favour of freedom of speech, and 82% supports freedom of religion, but almost half think that religion should not be professed in public. Previously, the EO made similar programmes about refugees (Rot op naar je eigen land, "Piss Off To Your Own Country", 2015) and environmental issues (Rot op met je milieu, "Get Lost With Your Environment", 2016).

== Participants ==
Name	Worldview
Jan	Christian (Baptist)
Sheila	Jewish (Liberal Jew)
Safeer	Muslim (Ahmadiyya)
Dineke	Christian (Dutch Reformed)
Bryan	atheist
Floris	atheist (Freethinker and vegan)

== Reception ==
Stichting KijkOnderzoek, a ratings tracking service, reported that about 531,000 people watched the first episode.

According to NRC Handelsblad, the EO used the programme to deliberately fan the flames of religious stress, and by their selection of participants created an unfair representation of the various worldviews: "The casting wants us to primarily look for reasonableness amongst the four religious participants (...). Even the two non-believers clash occasionally, because one is vegan and the other finds that to be politically correct bullshit. In short: in the first episode, the religious stress isn't quite fairly distributed yet between the followers of God and those who reject the existence of the fairytale character of god."

After three episodes, de Volkskrant, too, concluded that "the EO does everything within their power to let all hell break loose. There is no live and let live." Just like in the previous Rot op series, the programme would primarily be "about confrontation, heated discussions and perhaps a vain hope of reconciliation." It noted that the most fierce nonbeliever, Floris, "is portrayed the least sympathetic by the montage so far." On the preview of the fourth episode, in which Safeer shows his unease when meeting a gay Muslim, the newspaper's reviewer (referencing Genesis 1:4) commented: "Someone saw the announcement, and saw it was not good. Stress!"

A critic from ThePostOnline disagreed with the Volkskrant's criticism of the montage: "By definition, media select that which is appetising." On the contrary, 'sensational television' is interesting, especially to discover who 'understands the art of living and tolerance best'. In his opinion, the atheist and vegan Floris, "whose raised voice against his religious fellow man may go into Dutch television history as legendary", drawing the comparison to the late politician Pim Fortuyn, finishes last in this regard, followed by the imam Safeer, whilst sympathy for the atheist Bryan is growing throughout the series, and the Jewish Sheila has had the audience's sympathy from the beginning. Furthermore, the EO allegedly lacked a sense of humour, and the idea of 'let it be' would only rarely feature in the show.
