= Rot op met je milieu =

- Genre: Reality show, sustainability
- Presented by: Dennis van der Geest
- Country of origin: Netherlands
- Original language: Dutch
- No. of seasons: 1
- No. of episodes: 4

Production
- Producer: Tuvalu Media
- Production location: Netherlands
- Running time: 40 minutes
- Production company: EO

Original release
- Network: NPO 2
- Release: 11 October – 14 October 2016

Rot op met je milieu (English: Get Lost With Your Environment) is a 2016 Dutch television series by the Evangelische Omroep, presented by Dennis van der Geest.

== Setting and purpose ==
Six people confront each other's hugely differing opinions and behaviours towards environmental issues, whilst spending two weeks together in a small house in IJmuiden. Everything that goes into the house, such as waste and furniture, may not be removed from it during that fortnight, and presenter Dennis delivers them their combined CO_{2} emissions each morning in the symbolic shape of red balloons. The participants also go on educative trips to see environmental problems in practice, and how these may be dealt with and perhaps resolved. They must participate in these activities, unless they find this way too difficult to handle.

== Participants ==
Anne Fleur reflects on her experiences during Rot op met je milieu.

Name	Role
Anne Fleur	Environmentalist and vegan (pro-sustainability)
Donny	Climate change denier (anti-sustainability)
Hajo	climate change denier, has a master's degree in climatology
Jetse	Involved citizen (middle ground)
Roxanne	Uninvolved citizen (middle ground)
Susanne	Student sustainable development (pro-sustainability)

== Reception ==
During a preview, GroenLinks leader Jesse Klaver said: 'I'm really looking forward to this series. I think this is the best way to show how your personal behaviour has an effect on such a large phenomenon as the environment.'

Trouw reviewer Renate van der Bas wrote that viewers of the programme 'learn a lot', and characterised it as 'a fitting call' for more sustainability. However, the title chosen for the show, Rot op met je milieu, was 'not very subtle', and the selection of participants 'rather over the top'. Hans Beerekamp of NRC Handelsblad opined that the show was 'somewhat less predictable' than your average reality show, 'but most of it is still the result of editorial manipulation'. Beerekamp mostly criticised the fact that the two participants Donny and Roxanne, who he said represented the 'super-spoilt generation', didn't seem to realise how they contributed to the current environmental problems through their own behaviour.

== See also ==
- Rot op met je religie
