= Anne Fleur Dekker =

Dutch journalist

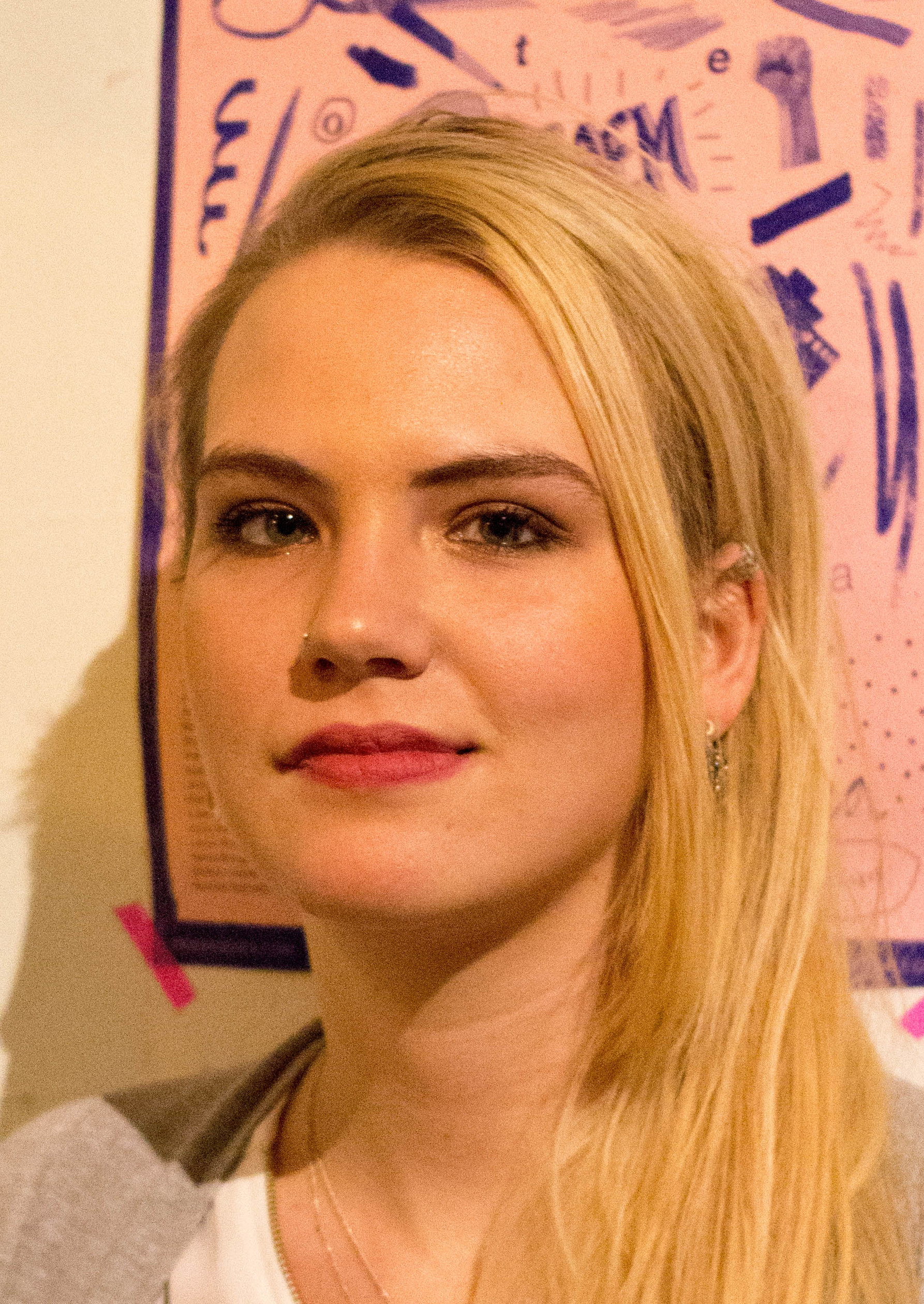
- Dekker, in 2017
- Born: 28 April 1994 (age 32); Blaricum, Netherlands
- Occupation: GroenLinks party employee in Hilversum (May 2016–March 2017)
- Notable credit(s): Activist whose criticism of conservative politicians Geert Wilders and Thierry Baudet sparked widespread controversy, and who subsequently had to go into hiding
- Anne Fleur Dekker's voice Recorded May 2017
- Website: https://annefleurd.com

Anne Fleur Dekker (born 28 April 1994) is a Dutch publicist, feminist and journalist. Dekker has written opinion pieces and blogs for politically left-wing websites and magazines, and has been an activist for several causes. She is a former GroenLinks party employee in Hilversum.

Dekker rose to nationwide prominence in March 2017, after politician Geert Wilders of the Party for Freedom (PVV) spread a message about a July 2016 tweet in which Dekker allegedly advocated for stoning Geert Wilders. Although Dekker claimed the tweet was written "sarcastically", this resulted in Dekker receiving threats en masse, and she was forced to go into hiding.

== Biography ==
=== Early life and education ===
Anne Fleur Dekker was born on 28 April 1994 in the North Holland town of Blaricum. She grew up in Bussum, and later moved to neighbouring Hilversum, where she went to grammar school. Her father voted CDA, her mother (a sister of MP Robin Linschoten) voted VVD, two conservative parties; but Dekker herself was gradually attracted to leftist politics. In her youth, she was often confronted with injustice, which she desired to counter. After seeing Al Gore's An Inconvenient Truth (2006), she decided to sign up for DWARS, the youth wing of GroenLinks.

In May 2016, she became a party volunteer for the local Hilversum GroenLinks department. After controverse the party decided not to support her as Dekker stated. GroenLinks did not give a reaction . As of October 2016, Dekker studied but not know what degree or if she finished her study, and often took part in public protests. By then, she said, she "often received criticism, ranging from 'unworldly leftist weirdo' to actual death threats."

=== Environmentalism and political protests ===
Dekker reflects on her experiences during the Rot op met je milieu show.

Dekker thinks it is important for children to be educated about environmental issues, such as recycling. When she was in primary school, the class once visited a waste processing and sewage company, which had a deep impact on her.

In October 2016, Dekker appeared in the four-episode EO television show Rot op met je milieu ("Get Lost With Your Environment"), in which she took up the position of environmental activist. In scenes on a fishing boat and at a pig farm, she was seen crying over the suffering and maltreatment of animals ("I don't want this to exist!"). The other participants especially sympathised with her on the needless killing of non-consumable fish in the form of bycatch.

During Veggie Fair on 23 October 2016 in Lisserbroek, Dekker gave a talk on effective activism. On 4 December, during VegFest 2016, Dekker lectured about her experiences during Rot op met je milieu, and about veganism and activism in general.

On 22 December, Dekker held a plea to stop eating meat during a "peace service for the animals" in the Vrijburg Church in Amsterdam.

On 20 January 2017, Dekker was part of the Women's March demonstration by several hundreds of people against American president Donald Trump (inaugurated that day), and against Geert Wilders, at the Museumplein in Amsterdam, "because they claim to serve the common man, but they don't actually do so," and were using Mexicans, Muslims and refugees as scapegoats. In response to Trump's controversial travel and immigration ban, passed on 27 January, Dekker organised a protest on 29 January at Schiphol Airport, to "show our solidarity with all the people who are currently stuck, or are unjustly stopped from travelling to the United States. Lots of these people, whom Trump is now refusing entry, have got visa, a job and a house, and now all of the sudden they're rejected because of this bizarre measure." They wanted to protest against the way in which KLM was complying with Trump's travel ban, and had prevented some passengers from boarding planes to the US based on their nationality. When setting foot inside the terminal, the protesters, numbering a few dozen, were removed by the Marechaussee (according to Dekker, this happened "brutally"; some people allegedly fell down and received minor injuries), because they were only allowed to protest outside the terminal, not inside.

On 15 April 2017, Dekker spoke at and participated in a Konijn in Nood ("Rabbits in Need") protest, supported by the Party for the Animals, against a rabbit breeding company in Moergestel. The animal rights activists demonstratively destroyed rabbit cages with sledgehammers, marched with torches and beating drums, and held a one-minute silence for the 'animal hell' to which they claim these rabbits were subjected.

In July 2017, Dekker participated in the demonstrations against the 2017 G20 Hamburg summit. The weblog she maintained these days was widely read, and received many negative reactions from Dutch right-wing media such as PowNed, who published a scathing piece entitled "All of Holland Hates Anne Fleur Dekker". Much of the criticism focused on the fact that Dekker reported much Neo-Nazi and 'excessive' police violence against leftist activists, but was silent about leftist violent rioting and vandalism (often referred to as "black bloc" tactics), which she claimed not to have witnessed.

=== Controversy and in hiding ===
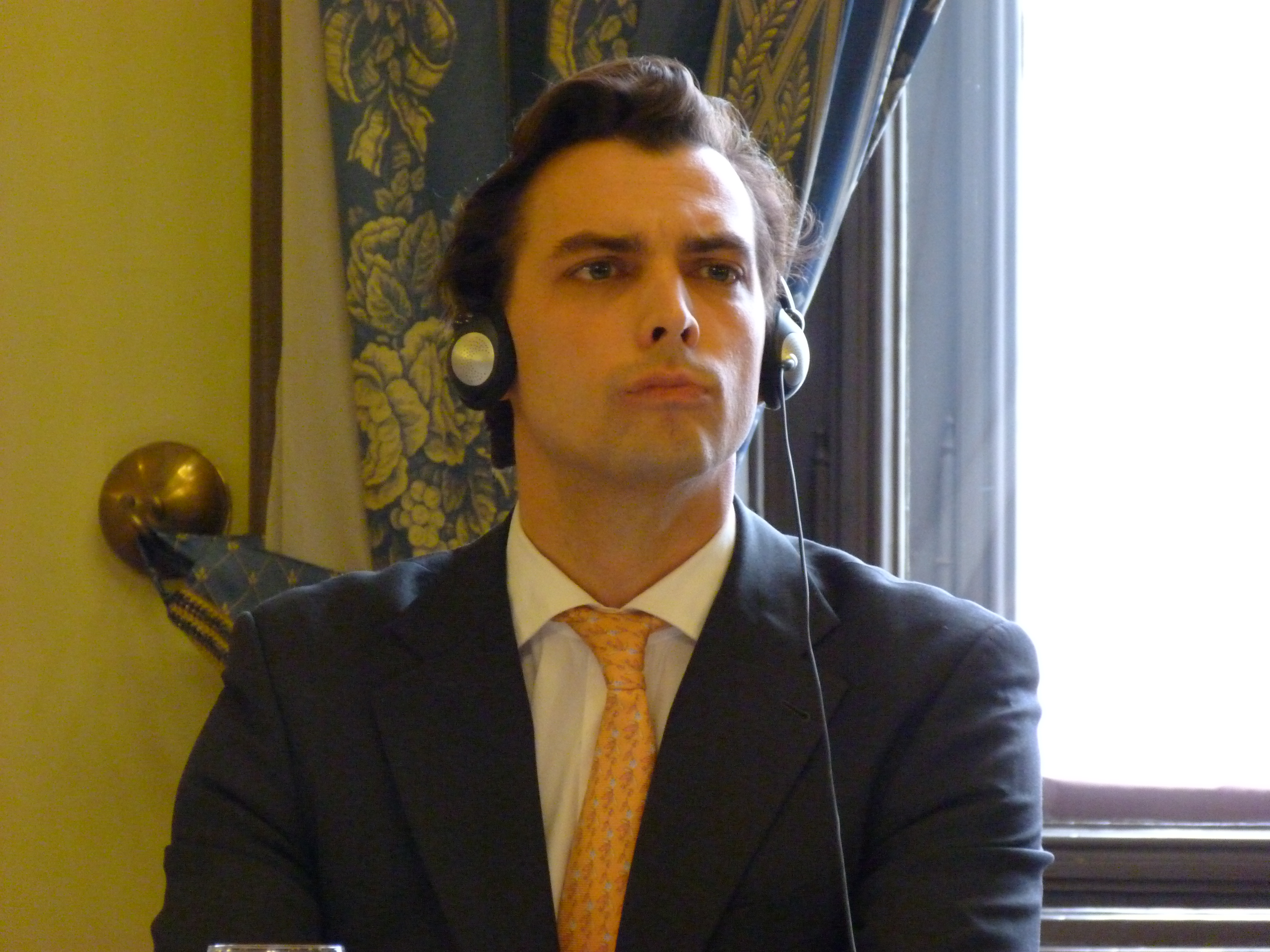
FvD leader Thierry Baudet

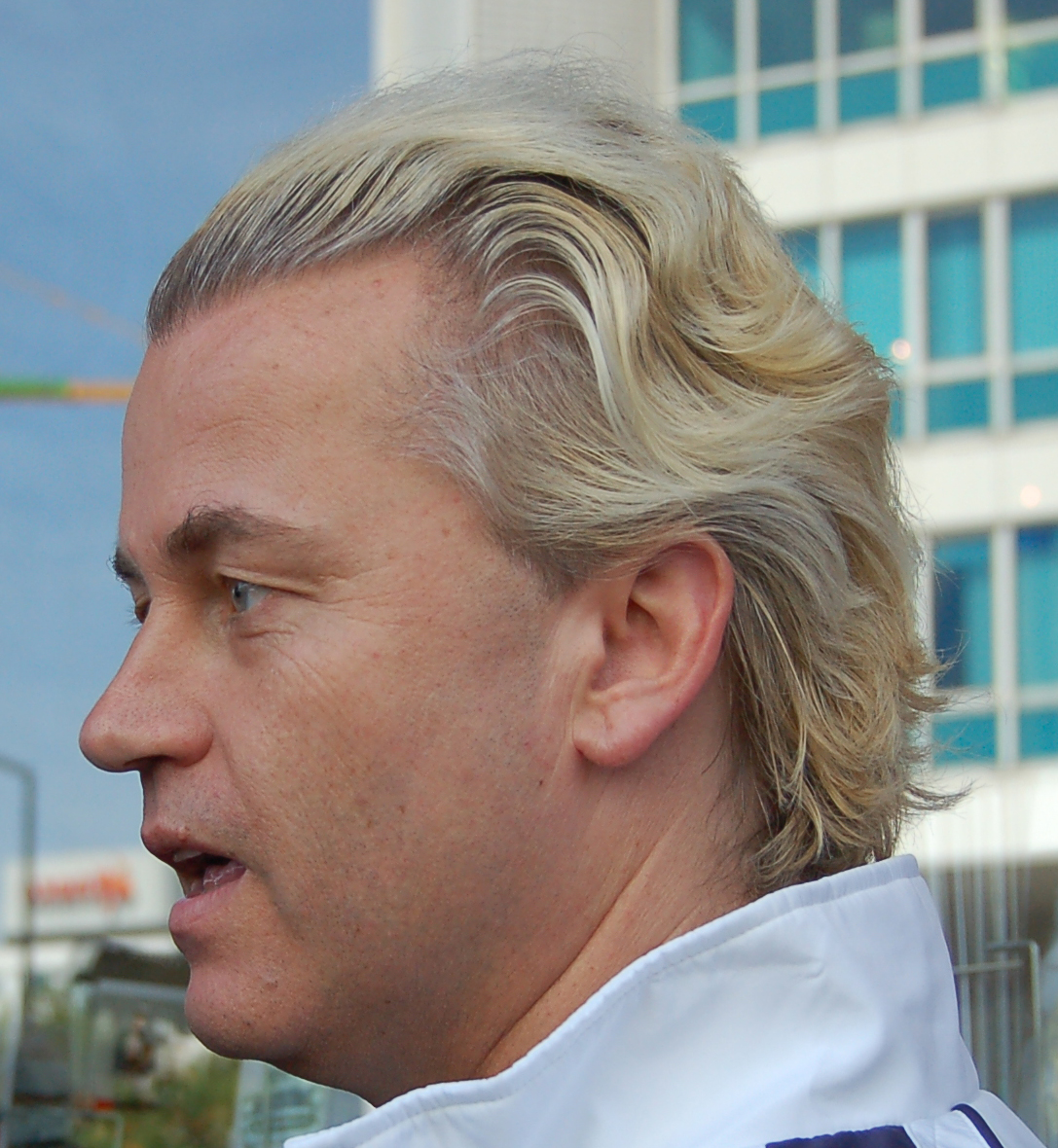
PVV leader Geert Wilders

On 16 March 2017, one day after the Dutch general election of 2017, during which Thierry Baudet's party Forum for Democracy (FvD) won two seats, Dekker wrote an opinion piece at Joop.nl, which was read about 70,000 times. She claimed that Baudet had justified rape in his description of the manners of Gregor, the main character of Baudet's 2014 novel Voorwaardelijke liefde ("Conditional Love"), thereby reigniting a controversy that had raged three years ago when the book was first published. Next, on 18 March, the right-wing populist conspiracist website liefdevoorholland.com resurfaced a few earlier online posts of Dekker as well, including an old tweet stemming from 19 July 2016. At the time, Dekker responded to a Belgian woman who had proposed on Facebook to throw stones at a mosque with "at least 500 people, as a 'fun action' in response to the radical Muslim violence of the past few nights". On 19 July 2016, Dekker tweeted a screenshot of this post with the commentary "Fine type this again", and next a new tweet saying: "Who will join [me] in throwing 500 stones at Wilders? Seems like a 'fun action' to me." Afterwards, she claimed her tweet was intended sarcastically. The website made a collage of an edited photo of Dekker with devil horns and two of her tweets, added an accusation of electoral fraud to the post and demanded a recount. However, contrary to her earlier tweet, Dekker did not preside over any polling place during the 2017 elections. According to the NOS, Hilversum mayor Broertjes had refused this because she had a "distinct political profile", but Dekker herself claimed she had already indicated two weeks before the elections that she would be too busy.

When Wilders spread the link to the liefdevoorholland.com post via Facebook on 19 March 2017, Dekker was soon forced to go into hiding because of countless serious threats and hateful expressions aimed at her via her workplace, at her family, at GroenLinks, and at the city council of Hilversum via Twitter, Facebook and by email. She thought the followers of Wilders and Baudet had "provoked" each other to threaten her. Allegedly, this was a lot worse because she was a woman, and according to her "all the right-wing platforms are now running rampant: GeenStijl, De Dagelijkse Standaard, The Post Online". She blamed Wilders, saying that he hadn't put her tweet in the right context. On 27 March, Wilders announced in a tweet he was probably going to report Dekker to the police for the 19 July 2016 tweet, in which she supposedly incited violence against him.

Dekker speaks about the hate campaign she was subjected to.

At the Joop Café podcast, Dekker said on 24 March: "Thierry Baudet [is] more dangerous than Wilders. In my article at Joop, I say that Baudet is a Wilders in sheep's clothing; but by now, my opinion is that he's at least ten times as bad as Wilders. Wilders is a one man show with a group of followers, whereas Baudet is really building a movement. Thanks to that club, I'm now in hiding." On Twitter, she advocated for pieing Baudet. This resulted in even more controversy, because the late right-wing populist politician Pim Fortuyn was pied in 2002 and assassinated four weeks later. In late-night talkshow Pauw on 28 March, host Jeroen Pauw suggested that pieing Baudet or any other politician was an act of violence in itself, and might encourage others to commit murder. Dekker rejected and condemned violence. She stood by her Wilders tweet as "cynical" and exposing the "double standard" by which almost nobody condemned the mosque stoning, but everyone was outraged over any threat against Wilders. However, she expressed some regret over the Baudet tweet, which was "perhaps not very clever" of her, but still said "justifying rape" was far worse. Former VVD politician Ed Nijpels criticised her behaviour as "duplicitous", whereas PvdD leader Marianne Thieme defended her right to free speech.

On 30 March, Dekker announced she had revoked her GroenLinks membership, because according to her, the party leadership had failed to support her cause. The next day, controversial Het Parool columnist Theodor Holman wrote that Dekker's radical activism turned him on, and he wanted to have sex with her. Dekker reacted furiously that he was a "filthy creep", that she felt "verbally assaulted", and called on the newspaper to prevent him from publishing such "misogynist locker room columns" in the future.

In February 2018 she said on Twitter that she was being threatened by her former leftist colleagues because she had become friends with several right-wing politicians. In fact she got into a serious relationship with a well known member of the FVD. She started to meet up with FVD members and even started to go to Baudet's FVD book releases/meetings. Paul van der Bas, author, speaker, boyfriend later broke up his relationship with her. Dekker got a holiday job in Lyon France (2019 summer) for a few months. She called it immigration but came back late 2019.

== Writings ==
Dekker has written for several left-wing media including Joop.nl and De Socialist, a monthly publication by the International Socialists.
