= Atheist Bus Campaign =

Bus ad campaign that started in Great Britain

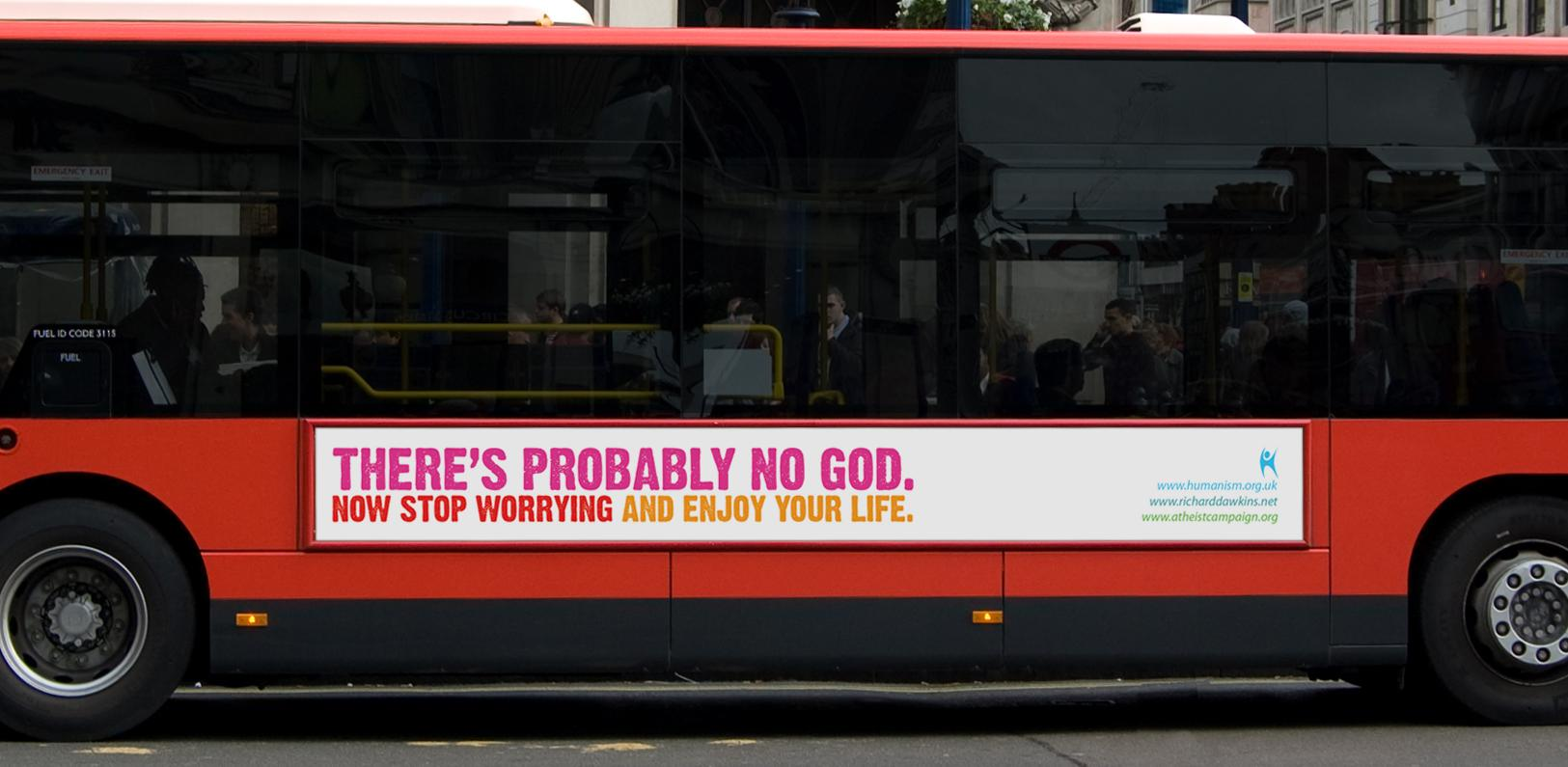
A London bus carrying the Atheist Bus Campaign advert

The Atheist Bus Campaign was an advertising campaign in 2008 and 2009 that aimed to place "peaceful and upbeat" messages about atheism on transport media in Britain, in response to evangelical Christian advertising.

It was created by comedy writer Ariane Sherine and launched on 21 October 2008, with official support from the British Humanist Association and Richard Dawkins. The campaign's original goal was to raise £5,500 to run 30 buses across London for four weeks early in 2009 with the slogan: "There's probably no God. Now stop worrying and enjoy your life."

Richard Dawkins, author of The God Delusion, agreed to match all donations up to a maximum of £5,500, providing a total of £11,000 if the full amount were to be raised. The campaign reached that target by 10:06 am on 21 October and had raised £100,000 by the evening of 24 October. The campaign closed on 11 April 2009, having raised a total of £153,523.51.

The first buses started running on 6 January 2009 – 800 ran around the UK and it was also planned to place 1,000 adverts on the London Underground featuring quotations from famous atheists. There were also two large LCD screens placed on Oxford Street, central London. The campaign received a number of complaints, but was cleared of any unethical advertising by the ASA.

== Initial proposal ==
Sherine first proposed the campaign in June 2008 in a guardian.co.uk Comment is Free blog post, Atheists – gimme five in the Guardian. She expressed her frustration that the Christian organisation JesusSaid.org was allowed to use bus advertising to promote the web address of a website that said that all non-Christians would burn in hell for all eternity. Sherine called on atheists to counter this kind of evangelical advertising by donating five pounds towards a positive philosophical advert. Her idea was taken up by political blogger Jon Worth, who went on to set up a PledgeBank page. The PledgeBank page closed on 31 July 2008, having received 877 of the 4,679 pledges necessary for the original target of £23,400. This event attracted some limited comment in the mainstream media early in August. Sherine then wrote a follow-up Comment is free article, Dawkin 'bout a Revolution, detailing events since the original piece. In response, the British Humanist Association offered to lend the campaign its official support and undertook to administer all donations. Sherine then asked Richard Dawkins for a quote for the campaign, at which point he offered to match the first £5,500 raised.

== History of the campaign ==
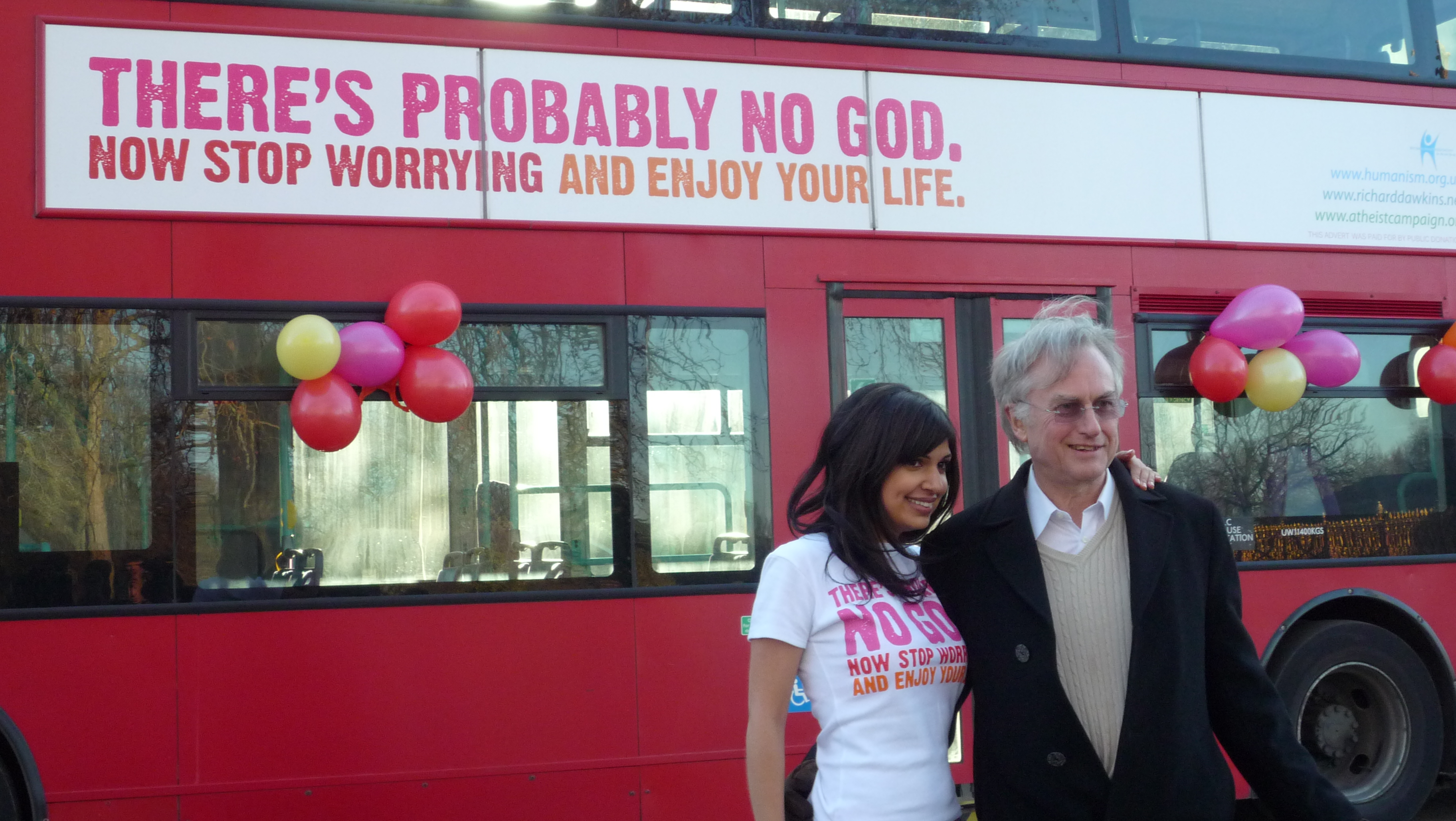
Ariane Sherine and Richard Dawkins at the campaign launch

The Atheist Bus Campaign's donation phase launched on Tuesday 21 October 2008 with another article by Sherine, All aboard the atheist bus campaign, on Comment is free. To the surprise of the organisers the fundraising target was broken within hours of the launch, raising almost £48,000 by the end of day one.

After four days the campaign had raised more than £100,000. There have been donations to the Justgiving page every day since the campaign's launch, and by 9 January 2009 the total had surpassed £140,000. The BHA has reported a flood of interest in its activities and the Atheist Bus Campaign Facebook group has been growing rapidly since the launch. Many atheists feel the campaign has given them a voice and represented them in a way they have long hoped for.

The story attracted widespread media attention around the world. Writing in The Times, Joan Bakewell observed that "Not since Going to Work on an Egg has an advertising initiative made such an impact, and for so little cost."

There has been some opposition to the adverts. By 21 January 2009 the ASA had received 326 complaints about the bus adverts, including a complaint from Stephen Green of Christian Voice (UK) who said "It is given as a statement of fact and that means it must be capable of substantiation if it is not to break the rules." Hanne Stinson of the BHA has suggested that if the ASA rule on this complaint, then the ASA will be ruling on whether God exists. On 21 January the ASA ruled that the adverts were not in breach of its rules as the advert "was an expression of the advertiser's opinion" and was incapable of substantiation. They also claimed that although the advert was contrary to many people's beliefs, it would not generate "serious or widespread offence". By the end of the year, the ASA had received 392 complaints about the adverts.

The campaign has also received criticism from leading clergy including George Carey, the former Archbishop of Canterbury, and Peter Price, the former Bishop of Bath and Wells, who said "the campaign lacked both judgement and a sense of reality."

In Southampton, a bus driver refused to drive a bus displaying the advert. His employers, First Bus, undertook to find him another bus to drive.

Canadian author, Margaret Atwood, has said of the campaign: "That's religion! Once you're paying money to put slogans on things, well it's either a product you're selling, a political party or religion".

== Notable donors ==
Television critic Charlie Brooker was the fourth person to donate to the campaign, giving £100 with the comment "I hope to God this helps".The poet and musician Labi Siffre donated £1000 on 22 October 2008 with the verse, "As God knew / What Judas would do / In the final accounting / Who betrayed who?" Philosopher AC Grayling donated £500, while writer Zoe Margolis donated with the comment "About time the rational voices were heard too". Richard Dawkins donated the most of any celebrity with £5,500, but even his donation has been eclipsed by that of an unknown donor called Simon Bishop, who has given £20,000 to the campaign. The campaign is also supported by Matthew Parris. Additionally, Paul Woolley, the director of Christian think tank Theos, and a close associate of the Archbishop of Canterbury, has donated £50 as he thinks the campaign is a "great way to get people thinking about God. The posters will encourage people to consider the most important question we will ever face in our lives." The Gay and Lesbian Humanist Association is a supporter of the Campaign.

== "Probably" ==
"There's probably no god. Now stop worrying and enjoy your life."

The wording of the proposed advert caused considerable debate among atheists and Christians alike and Sherine discussed it in a post-launch article, "Probably the best atheist bus campaign ever", on the Guardian's "Comment Is Free" section. Dawkins stated that he preferred the wording "There is almost certainly no God". Ariane Sherine claims it is necessary to be factually accurate, and that as it is impossible to disprove the existence of God it is only possible to say one 'probably' does not exist. Critic D. J. Taylor felt that this qualification let the campaign down, but admired it for introducing some tentativeness into an often polarised debate, while atheists including A. C. Grayling think that they can be certain there is no God and therefore the word 'probably' should not be used. It was also suggested that inserting the word would avoid a breach of the Advertising Standards Authority's rules.

== Don't Label Me campaign ==
The final phase of the campaign challenged the idea that children should be labelled with their parents' religion. In November 2009, an ad appeared on billboards, not buses, in London, Edinburgh, Cardiff and Belfast, displaying a young girl's picture with the caption "Please don't label me" followed by "Let me grow up and choose for myself". The background displays phrases ascribing various labels to the child—"Libertarian child", "Catholic child", "Sikh child", "Capitalist child", "Atheist child", "Protestant child", and so forth.

On 21 November 2009 it was reported in The Times and the Daily Telegraph that the children featured in the 'Don't Label Me' campaign were from an Evangelical Christian family. The British Humanist Association stated that the photographs had been sourced from a photographic agency website, and that it was unaware of the religious background of the models.

== Follow up works ==
In addition, Atheist Bus Campaign donors have raised over £23,000 for the British Humanist Association's Inclusive Schools campaign.

Following publicity from the campaign, the BBC has agreed to allow a special version of Thought for the Day. It will be presented as Thought for the Afternoon, and will be the first programme of the series not presented by a figure from an established faith.

Partly in response to the campaign three different Christian groups have launched advertising campaigns. Slogans include, "There definitely is a God; so join the Christian Party and enjoy your life."; "The fool hath said in his heart, There is no God.", a quote from Psalm 53; and "There IS a God, BELIEVE. Don't worry and enjoy your life." The Christian Party's adverts were the most-complained about of 2009, with the ASA receiving 1,204 complaints regarding them.

When Richard Dawkins turned down a debate with Christian apologist William Lane Craig in 2011, adverts were placed in Oxford with a parody slogan "There's probably no Dawkins. Now stop worrying and enjoy Oct 25th at the Sheldonian Theatre."

== Bus adverts in other countries ==
=== United States ===
Influenced by the Atheist Bus Campaign, the American Humanist Association launched a bus campaign in Washington, D.C., in November 2008 with the slogan "Why believe in a God? Just be good for goodness' sake." The Freedom From Religion Foundation had also launched a bus campaign in the United States, featuring buses with various quotations appearing during February and March 2009.

In February, a campaign formed in Bloomington, Indiana, in the United States, to run ads saying "You Can Be Good Without God" in various cities in the state of Indiana.

Significant attention and media coverage has been devoted to atheist roadside billboard campaigns, funded by various groups at the local level between 2008 and 2010.

=== Canada ===
In February 2009, a nationwide campaign was launched by the Freethought Association of Canada with Justin Trottier and Chris Hammond serving as spokespersons. The Toronto Transit Commission in Canada approved the advertisements on the commission's buses, trams, and metro and rapid transit trains, with the same message as the British adverts, and debuted in mid-February.

Following a request by the Association humaniste du Québec, the Société des transports de Montréal, Canada, accepted the proposed message "Dieu n'existe probablement pas, alors cessez de vous inquiéter et profitez de la vie", a translation of the original UK advert, and ten bus took to the road during March 2009. Secular Humanists and Free Thinkers in Halifax, Nova Scotia, and London have had their adverts refused. In Canada's capital city, Ottawa, the ads were initially refused, but the decision was ultimately overturned by Ottawa City Council and the ads will be permitted. In British Columbia, Vancouver, Victoria and Kelowna adverts were barred on the ground that no religious advertisement is allowed on buses.

The ads also ran in Calgary and eventually Halifax and Ottawa. The ads were initially rejected in both Halifax and Ottawa, but court cases overturned the bans.

In 2010, CFI Canada announced plans to put ads on Canadian buses with the phrase "Extraordinary Claims require Extraordinary Evidence". Below that phrase it lists Allah, bigfoot, UFOs, homeopathy, Zeus, Psychics and Christ. As of 2014, the bus campaign has not gone into action and it is unclear if it was cancelled.

In 2014, a series of ads were designed and planned to be placed on buses in Winnipeg, Manitoba. The campaign was intended to coincide with the launch of the Canadian Museum of Human Rights and featured opposition to the public funding of religious school boards in Ontario. The ads highlighted public funding of religious schools as a human rights violation. The ads were blocked by Pattison Outdoor Advertising who cited the Canadian Advertising Foundation's Code of Standards. The advertising campaign was privately funded by Dr. Richard Thain, a dentist and humanist from Eastern Ontario. Thain launched a lawsuit against the City of Winnipeg and Pattison Outdoor Advertising in 2017 with a claim that his charter right to freedom of expression had been denied by the refusal to carry the ads. The parties in the suit are expected to have an examination for discovery early in 2020. Several of the ads were carried in a modified form on bus shelters in the City of Winnipeg.

=== Brazil ===
On 11 December 2010 the Brazilian Association of Atheists and Agnostics (ATEA) attempted to run a bus campaign with the slogan "Ateísmo – celebre a razão" ("Atheism – Celebrate reason"), but were prevented from doing so on buses in Salvador, Bahia and Porto Alegre. The agency responsible for bus ads in Salvador informed that they would not sign the ad contract for fear of lawsuits, while in Porto Alegre, the passengers' association barred the campaign as the city ordinance prevents that bus ads bear messages related to religion. Instead, billboards were placed outdoors. The messages were "Religião não define caráter" ("Religion does not define character") and "Se deus existe, tudo é permitido" ("If God exists, everything is permitted").

=== Australia ===
The Atheist Foundation of Australia also attempted to run a bus campaign with the slogan "Atheism – celebrate reason", but were prevented from doing so by advertising company APN Outdoor, Australia's largest outdoor advertiser, which refused to run the adverts.

In the state of Tasmania the government-owned bus company, Metro Tasmania, also rejected the ads, citing their precedent of blocking any controversial material. However, after conciliation before the office of the Anti-Discrimination Commissioner the ads were scheduled to appear in 2010.

=== New Zealand ===
In New Zealand, fund-raising was started in December 2009 for the NZ Atheist Bus Campaign, administered by the Humanist Society of New Zealand. In just a couple of days, the original target of NZ$ 10000 was reached. A new doubled target of NZ$20,000 was reached in under a week. The organisers said this will provide signs for 12 buses in Auckland, eight in Wellington and four in Christchurch. However the advertisements were later rejected by several bus companies, notably NZ Bus, leading the organisers to bring a claim of discrimination to the Human Rights Review Tribunal. The organisers later ran a billboard campaign in the three cities with some of the money raised for the bus campaign using three different slogans combined with the slogan used in the original United Kingdom campaign.

=== Finland ===
In Finland a similar campaign was announced on 16 March 2009 to run on buses in Finland in three of the country's largest cities, Helsinki, Tampere and Turku. The campaign was run by Vapaa-ajattelijain liitto. In Helsinki, the text said "Jumalaa tuskin on olemassa. Lopeta siis murehtiminen ja nauti elämästä", a direct translation of the English campaign. In Tampere and Turku the text was changed to "Iloitse elämästäsi kuin se olisi ainoasi, koska se on" ("Enjoy your life as if it was your only one, because it is") due to opposition of local transportation providers.

=== Germany ===
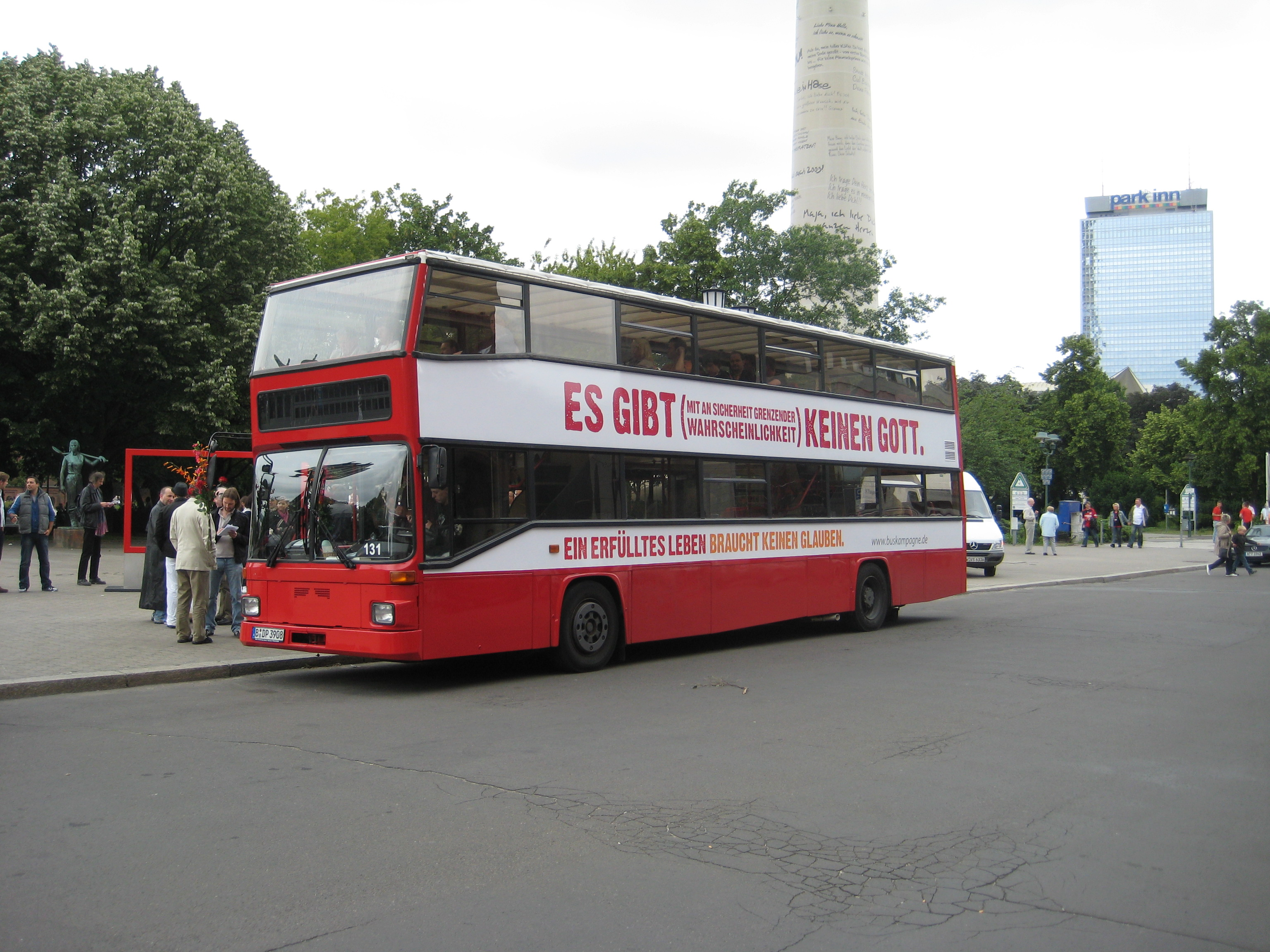
The bus in Berlin.

The German Atheist Bus Campaign had problems finding a bus company that would run their ads and the official website states that they were rejected by 17 companies from all over Germany. Instead they decided to drive the bus themselves on a tour that covered 20 major German cities. On each stop the bus took people from the city on a sightseeing roundtrip with an emphasis on what they saw as scientific and religious historical developments in respect to secularisation and atheism. This decision was met with mixed reactions from the supporters of the campaign who had originally hoped for a conventional advertising campaign, which had succeeded in other countries.

Among the general populace, the Atheist Bus Campaign was not well received, with some passerby viewing it as being reminiscent of the era of state atheism during the German Democratic Republic.

Campus Crusade for Christ decided to accompany the atheist bus tour with their own bus, bearing the slogan "Knowing God" ("Gott kennen"). Events arranged at the bus stops drew support from local Christian churches. This was praised by the Evangelical Church in Germany.

=== Austria ===
In Austria the Atheist Bus Campaign (Atheistische Buskampagne) was launched in July 2009 and had a follow-up campaign in the fall of 2010. Like in Germany advertising on buses for religious (but also political) purposes was not allowed by the bus services that are usually operated by the cities and not private companies. The first leg of the campaign was running three slogans: "There is probably no god.", "Es gibt keinen Gott" and "Gott ist ein tschechischer Schlagersänger." The third is a humorous reference to the Czech singer Karel Gott.

=== Ireland ===
The Humanist Association of Ireland ran a series of advertisements on Dublin commuter trains which they called the Unbelievable Campaign. The campaign was to highlight that judges and the president have to take a religious oath, which effectively stops 250,000 people from taking these posts.

=== Italy ===
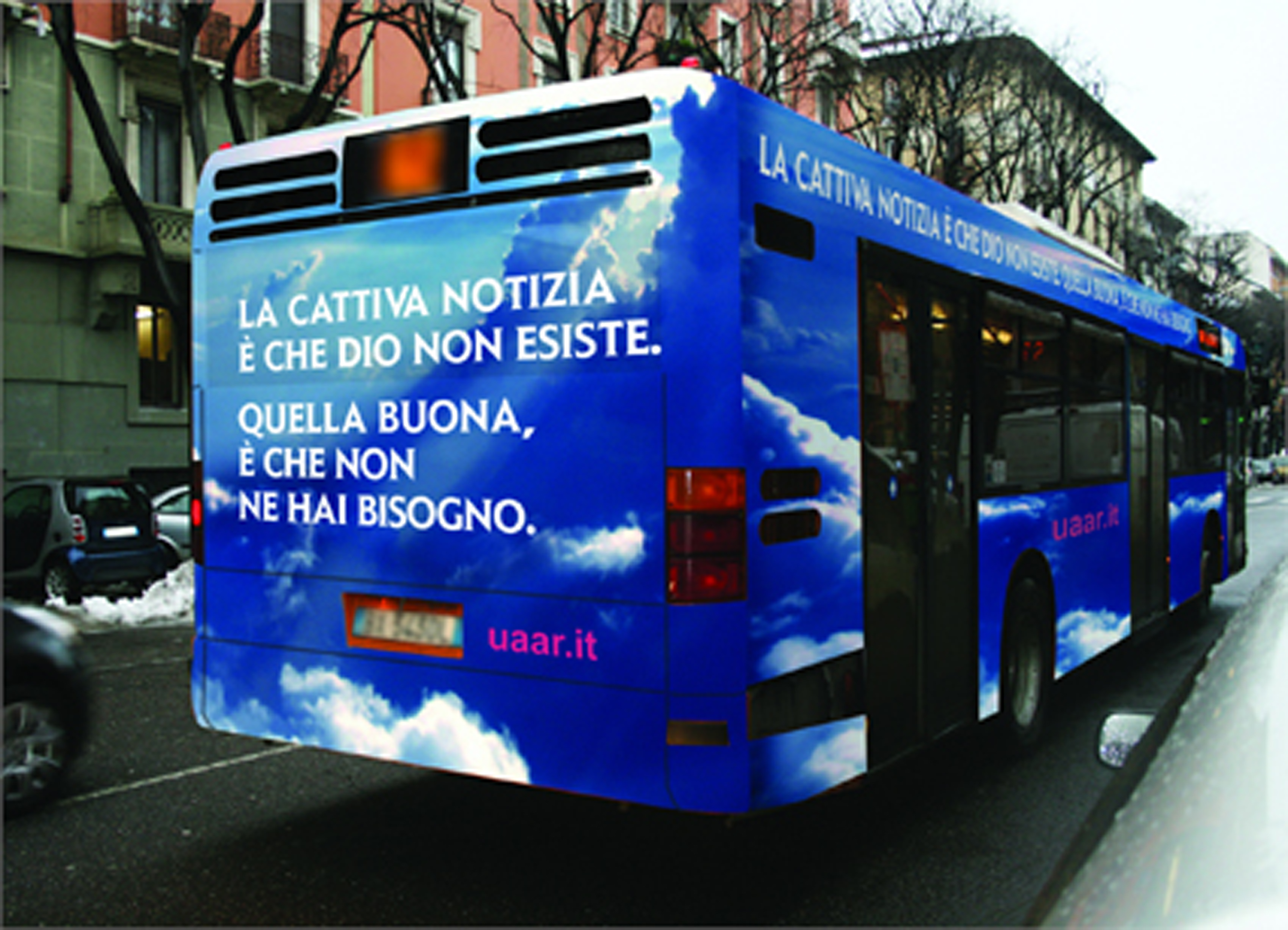
The original bus advert of the Italian campaign

An atheist bus campaign promoted by the Italian Union of Rationalist Atheists and Agnostics (UAAR) was due to start on 4 February 2009 in Genoa. The city was chosen on the occasion of the nomination of its archbishop, Cardinal Angelo Bagnasco, as president of the Italian Episcopal Conference (CEI). The slogan of the Italian campaign reads "La cattiva notizia è che Dio non esiste. Quella buona è che non ne hai bisogno", meaning "The bad news is that God does not exist. The good news is that you do not need him".

On 16 January 2009 IGPDecaux, the company holding licenses for ads on public transport in Genoa, refused to give authorization to the atheist bus campaign on the grounds that it may "offend the moral, civic and religious convictions of the public". Antonio Catricalà, the then head of the Italian National Authority for Fair Trading and Competition, announced that the Authority filed a case against the Atheist Bus initiative because of the potentially "dangerous and mendacious nature" of the ads. As a reaction, the UAAR launched a new campaign in Genoa with a different slogan to comply with the advertising authority's rules: "The good news is there are millions of atheists in Italy. The excellent news is they believe in freedom of expression".

=== Netherlands ===
On 12 January 2009, Dutch philosopher, atheist activist and director of the Center for Inquiry Low Countries, Floris van den Berg, announced the intention to launch a similar campaign in the Netherlands. Kees van der Staaij of the conservative Protestant Reformed Political Party (SGP) asked parliamentary questions about the matter to Secretary of State of Transport Tineke Huizinga, and discussed the topic with Van den Berg on 28 January in Nova. However, the bus campaign was abandoned, because the major bus companies Connexxion, Arriva and Veolia do not allow messages of a political or religious nature.

On 11 March 2009, Van den Berg was interviewed by the NOS when he took a new initiative to place a billboard along the A4 motorway near Schiphol, that for the first time in the Netherlands promoted an atheist message: "There is probably no god. Dare to think for yourself and enjoy this life!"

=== Spain ===
In Spain an advertising campaign has been launched with the slogan "Probablemente Dios no existe. Deja de preocuparte y goza de la vida", a direct translation of the British advert, on buses in Barcelona which started on 12 January. Madrid and Valencia will follow up at the end of January. This campaign has received criticism from Catholics.

=== Sweden ===
In Sweden, the Swedish Humanist Association ran ads in the Stockholm Metro during the summer of 2009 with the slogan "Gud finns nog inte", meaning "God probably does not exist" that were influenced by the British ads.

=== Russia ===
In Russia in September 2010 activists of "Общественное объединение по продвижению секуляризма в России" decided to make the same campaign in Moscow. It proposed the slogan "По всей видимости Бога нет" (It seems that there's no God). But clericals in the authorities prohibited it. After the activists were trying to get success via change the Campaign slogan on quotation from art.14 of Constitution of Russia "Russian Federation is a secular state", but clerical lobby prohibited this quotation also. Atheists were refused by Advertising Committee of Moscow, large advertising company News Outdoor (division of News Corporation of Rupert Murdoch) and small advertising agencies, city bus operator Mosgortrans, etc.". Now activists are collecting donations for "Atheistmobile" to ride in Moscow with Campaign slogan.

=== Switzerland ===
The Swiss Freethinkers' Association planned to put the statement "Wahrscheinlich gibt es keinen Gott. Kein Grund zur Sorge, geniess das Leben!" onto one public bus in ten cities of Switzerland. The campaign is a reaction to billboards with Bible quotes such as "I believe that Jesus Christ is God's son" or "Jesus is the light of life". The stated goal of the campaign was to give people a voice who feel harried by missionary messages.

Unknown parties have threatened the Luzern public transport operator VBL to set their buses on fire if they carry such messages; VBL employees were also verbally harassed. The Freethinkers' Association received hate email from radical Christians. The political party Evangelische Volkspartei was thinking about creating a counter-campaign.

In Bern, the metropolitan public transport operator SVB refused to carry the campaign, saying that they "do not want to take part in this provocation". Zürich and Geneva showed similar reactions: The cities did not want to risk offending religious feelings.
