= European Rail Passengers Union =

Belgium non-profit for rail passenger rights

The European Rail Passengers Union (ERPU) was established as an non profit in Belgium in June 2026. The ERPU aims to advocate for rail passenger's rights on a European level. The idea for the organization grew over time and be came more concrete in December 2025. An umbrella organisation for national rail passenger organisation already exists (European Passengers' Federation, EPF). In contrast to the EPF a personal membership is possible in the ERPU.
