= Ariane Sherine =

British writer (born 1980)

Ariane Sherine Juniper
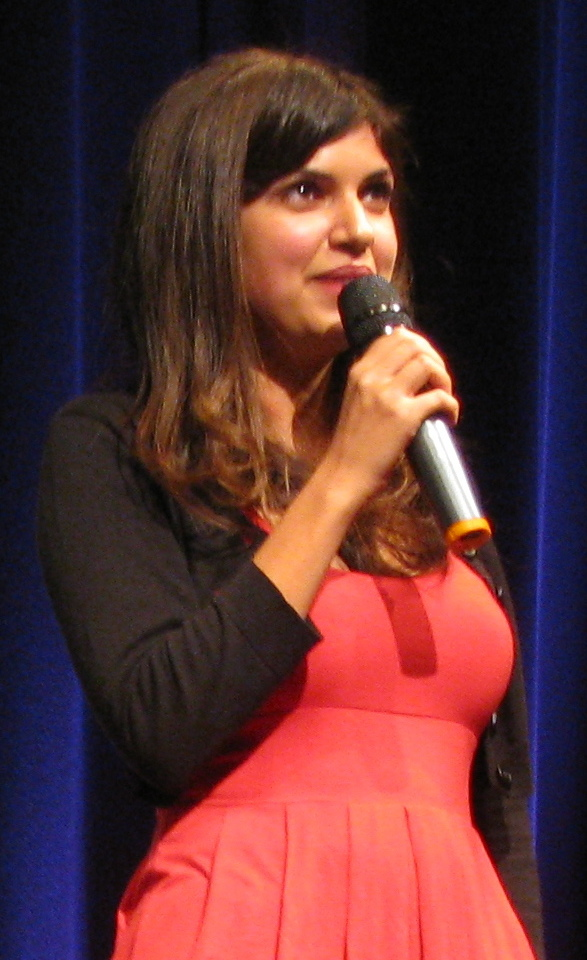
- Sherine at TAM London in 2009
- Born: 3 July 1980 (age 46); London, England
- Occupations: Comedy writer, journalist
- Spouse: Adam Juniper
- Website: arianesherine.com

Ariane Sherine Juniper (born 3 July 1980) more commonly known as Ariane Sherine is a British musical stand-up comedian, comedy writer, author, novelist, journalist and singer-songwriter. She created the Atheist Bus Campaign, which ran in 13 countries during January 2009.

== Career ==
Sherine has written more than 75 columns for The Guardian's Comment & Debate section, and has also written for The Observer, The Spectator, The Sunday Times, The Independent, Independent on Sunday, Esquire magazine, NME, and New Humanist.

She was expelled from school aged 16, and spent her late teens hanging out with the band Duran Duran at their studio. She sang backing vocals and played piano on two tracks at the recording sessions for the Duran Duran album Pop Trash.

She started in journalism aged 21, reviewing albums for NME before coming runner-up in the BBC Talent New Sitcom Writers' Award 2002. She also did six months on the stand-up comedy circuit in 2003, reaching the Final of the Laughing Horse New Act of the Year.

She then wrote comedy for British TV shows including the BBC sitcoms My Family and Two Pints of Lager and a Packet of Crisps, and links for the Channel 4 quiz show Countdown after appearing on the show in 2004. In addition, Sherine wrote episodes of several CBBC and CITV shows, including The Story of Tracy Beaker, The New Worst Witch and Space Pirates, before returning to journalism in early 2008.

In 2010, Sherine suffered a major nervous breakdown which she attributed to being violently attacked by a boyfriend while pregnant in 2005, as well as having had a violent childhood. She was diagnosed with generalised anxiety disorder, paranoia and obsessive-compulsive disorder, for which she is on medication. As a result of her breakdown, she did not write for over three years.

Sherine returned to writing for The Guardian at the end of 2013. In 2014, her comedy pop group The Lovely Electric released their debut album. Sherine wrote, performed and co-produced all the tracks. The album received good reviews, and an average of 4.7 stars out of 5 on Amazon.

In 2016, Sherine went back to the stand-up circuit. Her song Love Song for Jeremy Corbyn was featured in the London Evening Standard. Her weekly email Adventures of a Stand-Up Comic was serialised on the UK's leading comedy website, Chortle.

In October 2018, Sherine featured on the front cover of The Times as she was interviewed for T2 about her book on therapy, Talk Yourself Better, which was published by Hachette and featured interviews with celebrities including Stephen Fry, Charlie Brooker, David Baddiel and Dolly Alderton.

In April 2019, it was revealed that Sherine had signed a two-book deal for two more self-help titles with Hachette, How to Live to 100 and Happier, both co-writes with David Conrad, a consultant in public health.

In July 2020, Sherine announced her intention to become a pop star called Ariane X, and release her debut album at the end of 2021.

How to Live to 100 was published on 1 October 2020 and featured Sherine interviewing celebrities such as Richard Osman, Derren Brown, Jeremy Vine, Charlie Brooker, Lou Sanders, Jon Holmes, Josie Long, Robin Ince, Robert Llewellyn, Yomi Adegoke, Bec Hill and more on topics related to health and longevity.

In late June 2021, Sherine published a new podcast, Love Sex Intelligence, where she chats candidly and humorously with guests about love, sex, dating, romance and relationships.

Her debut novel Shitcom, which she had written almost 20 years earlier, was self-published almost unedited using Amazon's self-publication service in July 2021. Sherine was interviewed about the book by British Comedy Guide.

In April 2022, Sherine became editor of interiors website These Three Rooms.

In 2024, Sherine released her debut album Better under the artist name Ariane X.

== Atheism ==
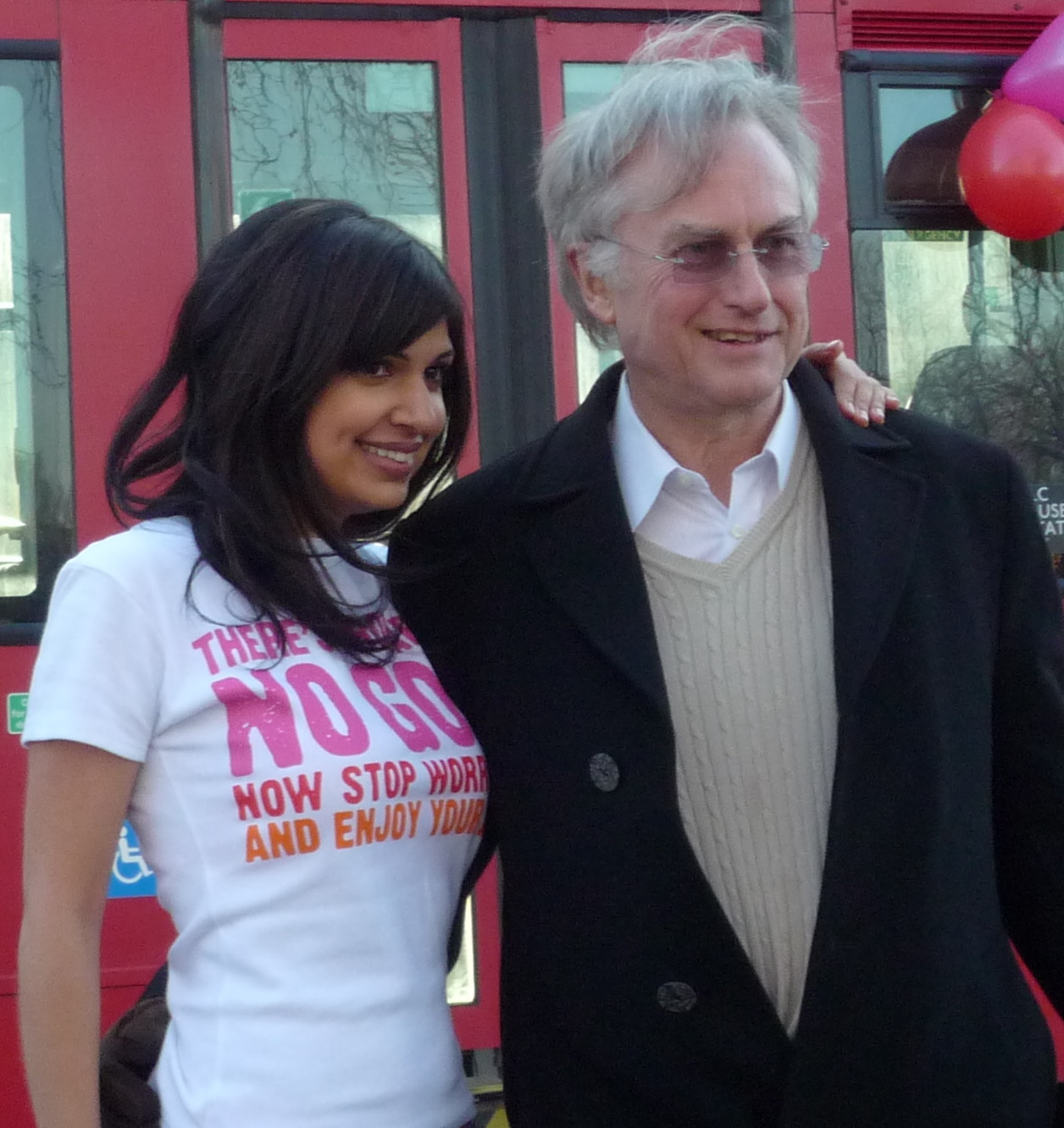
Sherine and Richard Dawkins at the Atheist Bus Campaign launch in London in January 2009

Sherine started the Atheist Bus Campaign in response to an evangelical Christian bus advertisement which gave the URL of a website "telling non-Christians they would spend 'all eternity in torment in hell', burning in 'a lake of fire'". She was brought up Christian, although her late father was a Unitarian Universalist, while her mother's side of the family are Parsi Zoroastrians (both parents are non-practising). In 2009, Sherine was nominated for Secularist of the Year 2009 (The Irwin Prize), a title awarded by the National Secular Society.

In January 2009, Sherine gave a non-religious equivalent of Thought for the Day on Radio 4's iPM programme. She spoke about accepting the beliefs of others as long as they are expressed peacefully, and how the freedom to hold them is more important than the beliefs themselves. Sherine's broadcast follows a similar one made by Richard Dawkins in 2002. Despite numerous objections over decades, Thought for the Day continues to be exclusively reserved for religious speakers in its usual slot on Radio 4's Today Programme, on weekday mornings.

In late 2009, Sherine announced that she was ceasing atheist campaigning and returning to journalism and writing a novel. She remains a distinguished supporter of Humanists UK.

== Books ==
In October 2009 the first atheist charity book, The Atheist's Guide to Christmas was released, which Sherine had been editing for the prior six months. The full advance and royalties from the book were donated to the UK HIV charity Terrence Higgins Trust. The book featured contributions from 42 atheist celebrities including Richard Dawkins, Derren Brown, Brian Cox, Charlie Brooker, David Baddiel, Simon Le Bon, Claire Rayner, Jenny Colgan, Josie Long, Simon Singh, Ben Goldacre, Adam Rutherford, Richard Herring and AC Grayling and became a bestseller.

In October 2018, Sherine's self-help book Talk Yourself Better: A Confused Person's Guide to Therapy, Counselling and Self-Help was published by Robinson (Little, Brown) in the UK. Sherine's life story in the book was serialised in the Mail on Sunday and Sherine was a featured guest on BBC Radio 4's Loose Ends.

In April 2019, it was announced that Sherine had signed a further book deal with Robinson for two popular science titles: How To Live To 100, examining the evidence for the benefits of lifestyle changes on increased longevity; and Happier, exploring factors which affect personal happiness and wellbeing.

== Philanthropy ==
In December 2013, Sherine launched a new campaign in The Guardian called Give Just One Thing, linked to a free e-book she had written called Give: How to Be Happy, available from the website givebook.co.uk. The campaign encouraged people to do just one of ten practical actions to improve the world, from signing the Organ Donor register to organising a charity initiative. As part of the campaign, Sherine sold 50% of her possessions in aid of the humanitarian charity Medecins Sans Frontieres.

== Personal life ==
Sherine has written for The Guardian about the physical violence and emotional abuse she received throughout her childhood at the hands of her late father, and about her experiences of domestic abuse during pregnancy from a former boyfriend, and her subsequent abortion. Sherine now has a young daughter, whom she describes as "my amazingly wonderful girl... I love her to infinity and back". She wrote and performed a song, "The Best Thing", to celebrate her daughter's 10th birthday.

On 4 May 2026 Sherine married Adam Juniper and adopted his surname in a double-barrelled surname form now going by the name Ariane Sherine Juniper.
