= Blasphemy law in the United Kingdom =

Laws prohibiting blasphemy and blasphemous libel in the United Kingdom date back to the medieval times as common law and in some special cases as enacted legislation. The common law offences of blasphemy and blasphemous libel were formally abolished in England and Wales in 2008 and Scotland in 2024. Equivalent laws remain in Northern Ireland.

Historically, blasphemy laws in England and Wales protected only Christianity, particularly the established Church of England, with prosecutions targeting those who denied Christian doctrine or mocked religious beliefs. The last person executed for blasphemy in Britain was Thomas Aikenhead, a 20-year-old Scottish student hanged in Edinburgh in 1697, while the last person imprisoned for blasphemy was John William Gott in 1921. The laws remained largely dormant until the landmark 1977 case Whitehouse v Lemon demonstrated they were still enforceable. The 1985 Law Commission recommended abolition of the offences, citing their anachronistic nature and incompatibility with modern human rights principles.

Following extensive campaigning by secular and religious groups, including Humanists UK and members of the All-Party Parliamentary Humanist Group, blasphemy and blasphemous libel were abolished in England and Wales by the Criminal Justice and Immigration Act 2008. The Racial and Religious Hatred Act 2006 had previously demonstrated Parliament's approach to addressing religious hatred by focusing on harm to individuals while explicitly protecting the right to criticise or attack religions as ideas and institutions. Scotland followed suit with the Hate Crime and Public Order (Scotland) Act 2021, which came into effect in 2024. More recently, concerns have emerged in the 2020s that blasphemous self-expression was once again being criminalised through prosecutions under the Public Order Act 1986, leading to calls for further legislative reform to protect freedom of expression and freedom of religion.

== England and Wales ==
The common law offences of blasphemy and blasphemous libel were abolished in England and Wales by the Criminal Justice and Immigration Act 2008. See also Racial and Religious Hatred Act 2006.

=== Ecclesiastical offences ===
The offence of blasphemy was originally part of canon law. In 1378, at the command of Pope Gregory XI, persecution of John Wycliffe and the Lollards was undertaken. However, the only punishment available to the bishops at the time was excommunication. The clergy, dissatisfied with this, forged an act of Parliament, without the assent of the Lords or Commons, enabling the arrest and imprisonment of heretics. In the following year an attempt was made by Parliament to repeal the act, which prompted a series of prosecutions, and the repeal failed. Not satisfied with their new powers, further powers were sought and granted under King Henry IV in 1401 (Note: Sometimes the year 1400 is given, as until 1752, the new year began in England on March 25 rather than January 1, and this statute was passed in February.) through the statute De heretico comburendo. These new powers allowed the bishops to arrest and imprison all preachers of heresy, all schoolmasters infected with heresy, and all owners and writers of heretical books. On refusal to abjure (solemnly renounce) or relapse after abjuration, the heretic could be handed over to civil officers, to be taken to a high place before the people and there be burnt, so that their punishment might strike fear in the hearts and minds of others. In April 1399, William Sawtrey was convicted of heresy and put to penance by his bishop. He was again arrested on 12 February 1401, as a relapsed heretic and was convicted by the Archbishop of Canterbury. Sawyer was burnt on 2 March, eight days before the power to inflict such punishment was granted. There is a long list of those burnt, or hanged and burnt, between 1414 and 1506. In the 17th century, blasphemy was declared a common law offence by the Court of King's Bench, punishable by the common law courts.

In 1656, the Quaker James Naylor was sentenced by the Second Protectorate Parliament to flogging, to be pilloried, branded on the forehead and the piercing of his tongue by a red-hot poker, and thereafter kept in prison on hard labour indefinitely. In sentencing Naylor, the judge, Lord Commissioner Whitelock, makes the distinction between heresy and blasphemy.

=== Common law offences ===
From the 16th century to the mid-19th century, blasphemy against Christianity was held as an offence against common law. When formulating his new Church of England's doctrines in the 1530s, Henry VIII made it an offence to say or print any opinion that contradicted the Six Articles (1539). Blasphemy was also used as a legal instrument to persecute atheists, Unitarians, and others. Ever since 1838, blasphemy was considered to be only a crime against beliefs of the Church of England.

All blasphemies against God, including denying his being or providence, all contumelious reproaches of Jesus Christ, all profane scoffing at the Holy Scriptures, and exposing any part thereof to contempt or ridicule, were punishable by the temporal courts with death, imprisonment, corporal punishment and fine. In 1656, two weavers, William Bond and Thomas Hibbord were indicted in Wiltshire for atheistic statements. In May of the same year, Alexander Agnew, known as "Jock of Broad Scotland", was convicted and hanged for blasphemy in Dumfries.

Taylor's Case in 1676 was the first reported case of the common law offence of blasphemy. It is unclear whether or not there were any unreported earlier cases. Lord Sumner said "Taylor's case is the foundation stone of this part of the law".

The report by Ventris contains the following passage:

And Hale said, that such kind of wicked blasphemous words were not only an offence to God and religion, but a crime against the laws, State and Government, and therefore punishable in this Court. For to say, religion is a cheat, is to dissolve all those obligations whereby the civil societies are preserved, and that Christianity is parcel of the laws of England; and therefore to reproach the Christian religion is to speak in subversion of the law.

In Rex v Woolston, "the Court declared they would not suffer it to be debated, whether to write against Christianity in general was not an offence punishable in the Temporal Courts at common law: it having been settled so to be in Taylor's Case in 1 Vent. 293. 3 Keb 607, 621 and in the case of The King v Hall, ante, 416. They desired it might be taken notice of, that they laid their stress upon the word general, and did not intend to include disputes between learned men on particular controverted points."

In 1841, Edward Moxon was found guilty of the publication of a blasphemous libel (Percy Bysshe Shelley's Queen Mab), the prosecution having been instituted by Henry Hetherington, who had previously been condemned to four months imprisonment for a similar offence, and wished to test the law under which he was punished. In the case of Cowan v Milbourn (1867) the defendant had broken his contract to let a lecture-room to the plaintiff, on discovering that the intended lectures were to maintain that the character of Christ is defective, and his teaching misleading, and that the Bible is no more inspired than any other book, and the Court of Exchequer Chamber held that the publication of such doctrine was blasphemy, and the contract therefore illegal. On that occasion, the court reaffirmed the dictum of Lord Chief Justice Hale, that Christianity is part of the laws of England.

The commissioners on criminal law (sixth report) remarked that although the law forbade all denial of the being and providence of God or the Christian religion, it is only when irreligion assumes the form of an insult to God and man that the interference of the criminal law took place.

The dictum "if the decencies of controversy are observed, even the fundamentals of religion may be attacked without the writer being guilty of blasphemy" was followed in R v Boulter (1908) 72 JP 188.

In the case of Bowman v Secular Society [1917] AC 406, Lord Sumner, echoing Hale's remarks in Taylor, summarized the position using the Latin phrase, deorum injuriae diis curae, "offences to the gods are dealt with by the gods": blasphemy is an offence against the (Christian) state, and is prohibited because it tends to subvert (Christian) society; offence to God as such is outside the reach of the law.

The last person in Britain to be sent to prison for blasphemy was John William Gott on 9 December 1921. He had three previous convictions for blasphemy when he was prosecuted for publishing two pamphlets entitled Rib Ticklers, or Questions for Parsons and God and Gott. In these pamphlets Gott satirised the biblical story of Jesus entering Jerusalem (Matthew 21:2–7) comparing Jesus to a circus clown. He was sentenced to nine months' hard labour despite suffering from an incurable illness, and died shortly after he was released. The case became the subject of public outrage.

In a 1949 speech, Lord Denning placed the blasphemy laws in the past, saying that "The reason for this law was because it was thought that a denial of Christianity was liable to shake the fabric of society, which was itself founded upon Christian religion. There is no such danger to society now and the offence of blasphemy is a dead letter".

In 1977, however, the case Whitehouse v Lemon (involving the periodical Gay News publishing James Kirkup's poem The Love that Dares to Speak its Name) demonstrated that the offence of blasphemous libel, long thought to be dormant, was still in force. During the House of Lords appeal Lord Scarman said that "I do not subscribe to the view that the common-law offence of blasphemous libel serves no useful purpose in modern law. ... The offence belongs to a group of criminal offences designed to safeguard the internal tranquillity of the kingdom."

The following cases, in particular, were approved by the House of Lords in Whitehouse v Gay News Ltd:

- R v Hetherington (1841) 4 St Tr (NS) 563, (1841) 5 JP 496, (1841) 4 Jur 529
- Shore v Wilson (1842) 9 Cl & F 524
- R v Ramsay and Foote (1883) 15 Cox 231, (1883) 48 LT 733
- Bowman v Secular Society Ltd [1917] AC 406, 33 TLR 376, 86 LJ Ch 117

Lord Scarman said that in his judgement the modern law of blasphemy was correctly formulated in article 214 of Stephen's Digest of the Criminal Law, Ninth Edition, 1950, which reads:

Every publication is said to be blasphemous which contains any contemptuous, reviling, scurrilous or ludicrous matter relating to God, Jesus Christ, or the Bible, or the formularies of the Church of England as by law established. It is not blasphemous to speak or publish opinions hostile to the Christian religion, or to deny the existence of God, if the publication is couched in decent and temperate language. The test to be applied is as to the manner in which the doctrines are advocated and not as to the substance of the doctrines themselves. Everyone who publishes any blasphemous document is guilty of the (offence) of publishing a blasphemous libel. Everyone who speaks blasphemous words is guilty of the (offence) of blasphemy.

The Human Rights Act 1998 requires the courts to interpret the law in a way that is compatible with the Convention for the Protection of Human Rights and Fundamental Freedoms. The offence of blasphemous libel is believed by some to be contrary to the freedom of speech provisions in the Convention. However, just before the introduction of the Human Rights Act 1998, a claim that the blasphemy law is inconsistent with article 10 of the Convention (providing for freedom of expression) was rejected in the case of Wingrove v UK (1997); a case brought by solicitor Mark Stephens. The Court decided that it was within the state's margin of appreciation for a restriction on free speech.

When the BBC decided to broadcast Jerry Springer: The Opera in January 2005, they received over 63,000 complaints by offended Christian viewers who objected to the show's portrayal of Christian icons (including one scene depicting Jesus professing to be "a bit gay"). The fundamentalist group Christian Voice sought a private blasphemy prosecution against the BBC, but the charges were rejected by City of Westminster magistrates' court. Christian Voice applied to have this ruling overturned by the High Court, but the application was rejected, the court finding that the common law blasphemy offences specifically did not apply to stage productions (section 2(4) of the Theatres Act 1968) and broadcasts (section 6 of the Broadcasting Act 1990).

==== Religion to which the offences relate ====
In R v Gathercole (1838), the defendant was convicted of criminal libel for publishing an attack on a Roman Catholic nunnery. Alderson B., in his direction to the jury, said that "a person may, without being liable to prosecution for it, attack Judaism, or Mahomedanism, or even any sect of the Christian religion (save the established religion of the country); and the only reason why the latter is in a different situation from the others is, because it is the form established by law, and is therefore a part of the constitution of the country. In the like manner, and for the same reason, any general attack on Christianity is the subject of a criminal prosecution, because Christianity is the established religion of the country."

In Bowman v Secular Society Ltd (1917), Lord Sumner said that this was a "strange dictum" because insulting a Jew's religion was no less likely to provoke a fight than insulting an episcopalian's religion.

The Church in Wales was disestablished in 1920. In 1985, the Law Commission said that the effect of this was that the church was no longer "the form established by law" nor "part of the constitution" of the Principality of Wales, within the meaning of those expressions in the dictum from R v Gathercole set out above. They said that, at that date, there was no authority as to the effect of this, if any, on the law of blasphemy in Wales.

In Whitehouse v Lemon (as Whitehouse v Gay News Ltd [1979] when it reached the Law Lords), Lord Scarman said that the offence did not protect the religious beliefs and feelings of non-Christians. He said it was "shackled by the chains of history" in this respect.

In R v Chief Metropolitan Stipendiary Magistrate, ex parte Choudhury (1991), a divisional court held that the offences prohibited attacks only on the Christian religion, and did not prohibit attacks on the Islamic religion.

It was also held that the failure of these offences to prohibit attacks on non-Christian religions did not violate article 9 of the Convention for the Protection of Human Rights and Fundamental Freedoms (which relates to freedom of religion).

==== Mode of trial ====
At the time of their abolition, blasphemy and blasphemous libel were indictable-only offences.

==== Sentence and orders on conviction ====
The death penalty for blasphemy was abolished by the Ecclesiastical Jurisdiction Act 1677 (29 Cha. 2. c. 9).

In R v Woolston, the defendant was sentenced to a fine of £25 for each of his four discourses (i.e. £100 altogether) and to imprisonment for the term of one year. He was also required to enter into a recognizance for his good behaviour during his life, himself in the sum of £3,000 and by others in the sum of £2,000. (As to recognizances, see also binding over).

==== Number of prosecutions ====
Before 1883, prosecutions were "much more common". In the years 1883 to 1922 there were five prosecutions. There was an unsuccessful private prosecution in 1971. The next successful prosecution was in 1977.

==== Individual prosecutions, arrests and failures to prosecute ====
In England a significant case was the imprisonment of Cornish well-sinker Thomas Pooley for twenty-one months in 1857. The last prominent 19th-century prosecution for blasphemy was the case of R v Ramsey and Foote, when the editor, publisher and printer of The Freethinker were sentenced to imprisonment.

In 1908, police court proceedings were taken against Harry Boulter for blasphemy uttered at a meeting at Highbury Corner, Hyde Park. An orator with links to the Rationalist movement he was jailed for a month in June 1909 and in November 1911 he was sentenced to three months for repeating the offence.

In February 1925, the Glasgow-based radical Guy Aldred was arrested in Hyde Park and charged with blasphemy and sedition.

In 1988, British author Salman Rushdie's novel The Satanic Verses was published. A number of Muslims considered the book to blaspheme against Islam, and Iranian clerical leader Ayatollah Khomeini issued a fatwa in 1989 calling for Rushdie's death, "along with all the editors and publishers aware of its contents". Consequently, the government was petitioned for Rushdie to be prosecuted for blasphemy. No charges were laid because, as a House of Lords select committee stated, the law only protects the Christian beliefs as held by the Church of England. The Rushdie case stimulated debate on this topic, with some arguing the same protection should be extended to all religions, while others claimed the UK's ancient blasphemy laws were an anachronism and should be abolished. Despite much discussion surrounding the controversy, the law was not amended.

Michael Newman, a secondary school science teacher and an atheist, was arrested under England's blasphemy law for selling Nigel Wingrove's blasphemous video Visions of Ecstasy in February 1992 in Birmingham. He was forced to resign from his school position due to protests from Christian parents. As a result, he became a subject of discussion in the media, including an appearance on Channel Four's Comment programme in England.

== Reform ==
=== Proposals to amend the law and protests ===
The Law Commission published a report in 1985 on Criminal Law: Offences against Religious and Public Worship. The report noted that "there is no one agreed definition of blasphemy and blasphemous libel and that it would scarcely be practicable, even if it thought desirable, to amend the common law definition by statute". The authors added that "it is now clear that none of the arguments for retaining a law of blasphemy are sufficiently strong to support this view and each of them is outweighed by other considerations which persuade us that a law of blasphemy is not a necessary part of a criminal code. Moreover, we have no doubt that any replacement offence which might be devised would in practice prove to be unacceptably wide in ambit." The Commission concluded "that the common law offences of blasphemy and blasphemous libel should be abolished without replacement". A minority report sought to create a replacement offence such that citizens should not purposely "insult or outrage the religious feelings of others".

In 2002, a deliberate and well-publicised public repeat reading of the poem The Love that Dares to Speak its Name by James Kirkup took place on the steps of St Martin-in-the-Fields church in Trafalgar Square and failed to lead to any prosecution by the Director of Public Prosecutions. It suggested Jesus was a homosexual. An earlier reading in 1977 had led to prosecution. Outraged Christians tried to drown out the 2002 reading. "We have won an important victory for free speech and the right to protest", declared human rights campaigner Peter Tatchell. "No one was arrested. The police didn't even take our names and addresses. The blasphemy law is now a dead letter. If the authorities are not prepared to enforce the law, they should abolish it". A trial would have involved all those who read and published the poem, including several writers, academics and MPs in Britain. After the event, Tatchell said "The blasphemy law gives the Christian religion privileged protection against criticism and dissent. No other institution enjoys such sweeping powers to suppress the expression of opinions and ideas."

On 15 May 2002 the House of Lords appointed a select committee "to consider and report on the law relating to religious offenses". The committee's first report was published in April 2003; it summarised the state of the law in this area, and found that the present law on blasphemy was unlikely to result in successful prosecution. The committee found no consensus on whether a new law against blasphemy was required, but concluded that any law should apply to all faiths. Home Secretary David Blunkett responded with plans to criminalise incitement to religious hatred, which became the Racial and Religious Hatred Act 2006, and he suggested the blasphemy law might be repealed once the new law was in force.

=== Abolition ===
In January 2008, a spokesman for prime minister Gordon Brown announced that the government would consider supporting the abolition of the blasphemy laws during the passage of the Criminal Justice and Immigration Bill. The government consulted the Church of England and other churches before reaching a decision. The move followed a letter written to The Daily Telegraph at the instigation of MP Evan Harris and the National Secular Society and was signed by leading figures including Lord Carey, former Archbishop of Canterbury, who urged that the laws be abandoned. Evan Harris and Lord Avebury shared the National Secular Society's 2009 Person of the Year award for their work to abolish the offence of blasphemous libel.

On 5 March 2008, an amendment was passed to the Criminal Justice and Immigration Act 2008 which abolished the common law offences of blasphemy and blasphemous libel in England and Wales. The peers also voted for the laws to be abandoned during March. The Act received royal assent on 8 May 2008, and the relevant section came into force on 8 July 2008.

=== Statutory offences ===
The Sacrament Act 1547 (1 Edw. 6. c. 1) set a punishment of imprisonment for reviling the sacrament of the Lord's Supper. It was repealed by the First Statute of Repeal (1 Mar. Sess. 2. c. 2) in 1553 and revived again in 1558.

The interregnum Parliament in 1650, "holding it to be [its] duty, by all good ways and means to propagate the Gospel in this Commonwealth, to advance Religion in all Sincerity, Godliness, and Honesty" passed "An Act against several Atheistical, Blasphemous and Execrable Opinions, derogatory to the honor of God, and destructive to humane Society", known as the Blasphemy Act of 1650 and intended to punish those "who should abuse and turn into Licentiousness, the liberty given in matters of Conscience". All acts of Interregnum period were considered void after the English Restoration due to their lack of royal assent.

Profane cursing and swearing was made punishable by the Profane Oaths Act 1745, which directed that the offender be brought before a justice of the peace, and fined an amount that depended on his social rank. It was repealed by section 13 of the Criminal Law Act 1967.

Those denying the Trinity were deprived of the benefit of the Toleration Act 1688. The Blasphemy Act 1697 enacted that if any person, educated in or having made profession of the Christian religion, should by writing, preaching, teaching or advised speaking, deny that the members of the Holy Trinity were God, or should assert that there is more than one god, or deny the Christian religion to be true, or the Holy Scriptures to be of divine authority, he should, upon the first offence, be rendered incapable of holding any office or place of trust, and for the second incapable of bringing any action, of being guardian or executor, or of taking a legacy or deed of gift, and should suffer three years imprisonment without bail.

The Doctrine of the Trinity Act 1813 (53 Geo. 3. c. 160) excepted from these enactments "persons denying as therein mentioned respecting the Holy Trinity".

=== Relationship between the common law and statutory offences ===
A person offending under the Blasphemy Act 1697 was also indictable at common law. In Rex v Carlile, Mr Justice Best said:

So far as the Statute of William containing provisions so inconsistent with the common law as to operate as a repeal by implication, as far as it applies to the offence of libel, it seems intended to aid the common law. It is called "An Act for the More Effectual Suppression of Blasphemy and Prophaneness." It would ill deserve that name if it abrogated the common law, inasmuch as, for the first offence, it only operates against those who are in possession of offices, or in expectation of them. The rest of the world might with impunity blaspheme God, and prophane the ordinances and institutions of religion, if the common law punishment is put an end to. But the Legislature, in passing this Act, had not the punishment of blasphemy so much in view as the protecting the Government of the country, by preventing infidels from getting into places of trust. In the age of toleration in which that statute passed, neither churchmen or sectarians wished to protect in their infidelity those who disbelieved the Holy Scriptures. On the contrary, all agreed, that as the system of morals which regulated their conduct was built on these Scriptures, none were to be trusted with offices who shewed they were under no religious responsibility. This Act is not confined to those who libel religion, but extends to those who, in the most private intercourse by advised conversation, admit that they disbelieve the Scriptures. Both the common law and this statute are necessary; the first to guard the morals of the people; the second for the immediate protection of the Government.

== Scotland ==
By the law of Scotland, as it originally stood, the punishment for blasphemy was death, a penalty last imposed on Thomas Aikenhead in Edinburgh in 1697. By the Leasing-making (Scotland) Act 1825 (6 Geo. 4. c. 47), amended by the Leasing-making, etc. (Scotland) Act 1837 (7 Will. 4 & 1 Vict. c. 5), blasphemy was made punishable by fine or imprisonment or both. The last prosecution for blasphemy in Scotland was in 1843 when bookseller Thomas Paterson was sentenced at Edinburgh High Court to fifteen months in prison for selling profane placards,

BOW-STREET POLICE-OFFICE.

SATURDAY, DEC. 24, 1842.

(Reported especially for the Oracle of Reason.)

This being the day on which Mr. Thomas Paterson, bookseller, of No. 8, Holywell street, was to appear at this office and answer to four summonses preferred against him for exhibiting certain profane placards in his window, to the annoyance of the neighbourhood and the public—the court was crowded with persons anxious to hear the charges.

Mr. Twyford was the presiding magistrate. Mr. Hall was also on the bench.

The name of Mr. Paterson having been called within and without the court three times, and no answer having been given.

According to the 18th–19th century legal writer David Hume (nephew of the philosopher), Scots law distinguished between blasphemy, which was uttered in passion generally in the heat of the moment, and other offences which involved the propagation of ideas contrary to religion. It is blasphemy, Hume wrote

when it is done in a scoffing and railing manner; out of a reproachful disposition in the speaker, and, as it were, with passion against the Almighty, rather than with any purpose of propagating the irreverent opinion. The like sentiments uttered dispassionately or conveyed in any calm or advised form, are rather a heresy or an apostasy than a proper blasphemy.

— Quoted in Commonwealth of Massachusetts v Kneeland, 37 Mass. 206 (1838)

The Human Rights Act 1998 applies in Scotland as well as England and Wales, and therefore poses similar challenges to the existing Scottish blasphemy laws as those described above. Additionally, some legal commentators believe that, owing to the long time since successful prosecution, blasphemy in Scotland is no longer a crime, although blasphemous conduct might still be tried as a breach of the peace.

In 2005, the Crown Office and Procurator Fiscal Service considered a complaint under the blasphemy law regarding the BBC transmission of Jerry Springer: The Opera, but did not proceed with charges.

On 24 April 2020, the Scottish Government published a new bill that seeks to reform hate crime legislation to provide better protection against race, sex, age and religious discrimination, and would also decriminalise blasphemy. Humanists UK, which campaigns against blasphemy laws, welcomed the bill. The Hate Crime and Public Order (Scotland) Act 2021 received royal assent on 23 April 2021 and abolished the common law offence of blasphemy from 1 April 2024.

== Northern Ireland ==
Blasphemy and blasphemous libel continue to be offences under the common law of Northern Ireland. On 5 November 2009, in the House of Lords, an amendment to the Coroners and Justice Bill was moved, which would have abolished these offences in Northern Ireland, but following a brief debate, the amendment was withdrawn.

In March 2019, Northern Ireland Humanists, part of Humanists UK, launched a campaign to abolish blasphemy laws in Northern Ireland, following on from the referendum result in Ireland and other recent international efforts to repeal blasphemy laws.

== Campaign to reform Public Order Act ==
Following the abolition of blasphemy laws in England and Wales in 2008, concerns have emerged that blasphemy offences are being effectively reintroduced through prosecutions under the Public Order Act 1986. The controversy centres on a 2025 case where a man was convicted for burning a Quran outside the Turkish Embassy in London, originally charged with harassing "the religious institution of Islam" before the charge was amended. Humanists UK argued that prosecutors circumvented explicit free speech protections in Section 29J of the Public Order Act by charging the defendant under sections not covered by these safeguards.

In response to these concerns, MPs have called for legislative reform to protect freedom of expression regarding religion. A Freedom of Expression (Religion) Bill has been proposed to extend Section 29J protections to cover all parts of the Public Order Act. The campaign has been supported by civil liberties groups, with Humanists UK warning that if the Public Order Act can be interpreted to criminalise blasphemy, it "urgently needs amendment to prevent such misapplications".

== Bibliography ==
- Hypatia Bradlaugh Bonner (1912). Penalties Upon Opinion, or, Some records of the laws of heresy and Blasphemy. Watts & Co. on behalf of Rationalist Press Association.
- Marsh, Joss (1998). Word crimes: blasphemy, culture, and literature in nineteenth-century England. University of Chicago Press. ISBN 0-226-50691-6
- Walter, Nicolas (1990). Blasphemy Ancient and Modern. London: Rationalist Press Association. ISBN 0-301-90001-9

== See also ==
- Blasphemy law
- George William Foote
- Religion in the United Kingdom
- Status of religious freedom in the United Kingdom
- Richard Webster (British author)
