= Freedom of religion in the United Kingdom =

The right to freedom of religion in the United Kingdom is provided for in all three constituent legal systems, by devolved, national, European, and international law and treaty. Four constituent nations compose the United Kingdom, resulting in an inconsistent religious character, and there is no state church for the whole kingdom.

In 2023, the country was scored 4 out of 4 for religious freedom.

== Laws guaranteeing freedom of religion ==
=== European Convention on Human Rights ===
The ECHR guarantees in Article 9 that subjects will have:

The right to freedom of thought, conscience and religion this right includes freedom to change his religion or belief and freedom, either alone or in community with others and in public or private, to manifest his religion or belief, in worship, teaching, practice and observance[…] The freedom to manifest one's religion or beliefs shall be subject only to such limitations as are prescribed by law and are necessary in a democratic society in the interests of public safety, for the protection of public order, health or morals, or for the protection of the rights and freedoms of others.

=== Human Rights Act ===
The right is given in the United Kingdom by s. 1 ss. (1)(a) of the Human Rights Act 1998 (HRA), as the "right and fundamental freedom".

=== United Nations General Assembly ===
In Article 18 of the International Covenant on Civil and Political Rights, which was adopted by the United Nations General Assembly in resolution 2200A (XXI) on 16 December 1966, the UN resolved that:

Everyone shall have the right to freedom of thought, conscience and religion. This right shall include freedom to have or adopt a religion or belief of his choice, and freedom, either individually or in community with others and in public or private, to manifest his religion or belief in worship, observance, practice or teaching.

The United Nations Human Rights Committee, a subsidiary body of the General Assembly, also affirmed in General Comment 22 on July 30, 1993, that the right to freedom of religion applies to unconventional or extra-institutional religions, as well as atheist or anti-clerical beliefs:

Article 18 [of the International Covenant on Civil and Political Rights] protects theistic, non-theistic and atheistic beliefs, as well as the right not to profess any religion or belief. The terms belief and religion are to be broadly construed. Article 18 is not limited in its application to traditional religions or to religions and beliefs with institutional characteristics or practices analogous to those of traditional religions.

== Monarchy ==
The Act of Settlement 1701 decrees that the monarch of Great Britain (later the United Kingdom) "shall join in communion with the Church of England". This act was specifically designed to prevent a Catholic monarch from ascending to the throne, but in effect discriminates against all religions other than Protestantism. Members of the royal family in line of succession who married a Roman Catholic (though not adherents of other denominations or faiths) were excluded from the succession. Under the provisions of the Succession to the Crown Act 2013, marrying a Roman Catholic no longer disqualifies a person from succeeding to the Crown; however, the provision of the Act of Settlement requiring the monarch to be a Protestant continues unrepealed.

== Churches with special status ==
=== Church of England ===
In England, the state church is the Church of England, and the Supreme Governor of the church is the British monarch. As already mentioned, the monarch is required to "join in communion with the Church of England". As part of the coronation ceremony, the monarch swears an oath to "maintain and preserve inviolably the settlement of the Church of England, and the doctrine, worship, discipline, and government thereof, as by law established in England" before being crowned by the senior cleric of the Church, the Archbishop of Canterbury. All clergy of the Church swear an oath of allegiance to the monarch before taking office.

Parliament has the authority to govern the Church of England, but since 1919, it has generally delegated this authority to the Church's General Synod (formerly known as the Church Assembly). Parliament retains the ability to veto measures of the General Synod or Church Assembly; this rarely invoked power was used in 1927 and 1928 to prevent the adoption of a revised prayer book. Measures also require royal assent.

The appointment of bishops and archbishops of the Church falls under the royal prerogative. In current practice, the Prime Minister makes the choice from two candidates submitted by a commission of prominent Church members, then passes his choice on to the monarch. The Prime Minister plays this role even though they themself are not required to be a member of the Church of England or even a Christian—for example Clement Attlee was an agnostic who described himself as "incapable of religious feeling".

Although it is an established church, the Church of England receives no state funding. Instead, the Church relies on donations, land and investments.

=== Church of Scotland ===
Since the Church of Scotland Act 1921, the Church of Scotland has been independent from the state. The monarch does, however, take an oath to preserve the Church of Scotland at the meeting of the Privy Council immediately following his or her accession. The monarch also has the right to attend the General Assembly of the Church of Scotland, but usually sends a High Commissioner in his or her place.

=== Church in Wales ===
Since 1920, the Church in Wales has been independent of the state. The church is, however, legally required to perform opposite-sex marriages where at least one of those being married has resided in one of its parishes for six months (a similar requirement applies to the Church of England).

== Adoption agencies ==
The Equality Act 2006 is equally applied to both religious-based and secular adoption agencies. The Catholic adoption agencies unsuccessfully attempted to negotiate a compromise that would have included an exemption for religious-based agencies. This exemption would have allowed them to continue facilitating adoption exclusively for opposite-sex parents.

== Education ==
Several university student associations have implemented rules that mandate affiliated groups to allow "anybody, regardless of faith, ethnicity, or sexuality, to sit on their ruling committees and to address their meetings." However, some Christian Unions argue that they should be permitted to require that their ruling committees share their beliefs.

== Service provision ==
In May 2008, Lillian Ladele, a registrar from Islington, London, took her employer, Islington London Borough Council, to the London Central Employment Tribunal, with the financial backing of the Christian Institute. Ladele had refused to conduct civil partnerships on religious grounds, and following complaints from other staff she was disciplined under the Council's Fairness for All policy. Ladele claimed she had been subject to direct and indirect discrimination, and harassment in the workplace, on grounds of her religion. In July 2008, the tribunal found in Ladele's favour, however this ruling was overturned by the Employment Appeal Tribunal in December, 2008.

In 2011 a judge ruling on a bed and breakfast refusing to accommodate unmarried couples found in favour of a gay couple under the Equality Act 2010 but allowed an appeal, commenting that the ruling: 'does affect the human rights of the defendants to manifest their religion'.

== History ==
Due to the United Kingdom having been formed by the union of previously independent states from 1707, most of the largest religious groups do not have UK-wide organisational structures.

The Oath of Supremacy, originally imposed by King Henry VIII of England through the Act of Supremacy 1534, required any person taking public or church office in England to swear allegiance to the monarch as Supreme Governor of the Church of England. Roman Catholics who refused to take the Oath of Supremacy were indicted for treason on charges of praemunire.

The First Declaration of Indulgence of 1672 was an attempt by Charles II to allow for more religious toleration by suspending the execution of penal laws against nonconformists and recusants. However, the Declaration was rejected by parliament and the Test Act of 1673 was issued in its place, which required anyone holding civil, military or religious office to take oaths of supremacy and allegiance, denounce transubstantiation and receive anglican eucharist. This was extended to include peers in 1678.

The Second Declaration of Indulgence (1687) issued by James II shortly allowed for full religious freedom until the Glorious Revolution. The subsequent Toleration Act of 1688 granted freedom of worship only to nonconformists who had pledged to the oaths of allegiance and supremacy and rejected transubstantiation, i.e., to Protestants who dissented from the Church of England. The Act intentionally did not apply to Roman Catholics, Jews, nontrinitarians, and atheists.. In practice, it allowed for Baptists, Congregationalists and Presbyterians to function as tolerated religions while imposing some regulations to the way they are allowed to organise themselves.

The Nonconformist Relief Act 1779 allowed freedom of worship for all self-declared Protestants who took the oaths of allegiance and supremacy.

The Doctrine of the Trinity Act 1813 extended religious toleration to Unitarians.

Anti-Catholic sentiment slowly decreased over the years and in late 18th century, the process of Catholic emancipation began. The Papists Act 1778 allowed Roman Catholics to own property and to inherit land and the Roman Catholic Relief Act 1791 allowed them to worship, practice law, and establish Catholic schools. Finally, the Roman Catholic Relief Act 1829 allowed catholics to hold civil offices. The Roman Catholic Church officially reestablished dicoeses in England in 1850 and in Scotland in 1878.

=== Blasphemy law ===
The common law offence of blasphemy was repealed in 2008. The last person to be imprisoned for blasphemy in the UK was John William Gott in 1922, for comparing Jesus Christ to a clown. The next blasphemy case was in 1977, when Mary Whitehouse brought a private prosecution (Whitehouse v. Lemon) against the editor of Gay News for blasphemous libel after he published a poem by James Kirkup called "The Love That Dares to Speak Its Name". Denis Lemon was given a nine-month suspended sentence and a £500 fine for publishing the "most scurrilous profanity" which portrayed the sexual love of a Roman centurion for the body of Christ on the cross. The sentence was upheld on appeal.

In this appeal case, Lord Scarman held that the modern law of blasphemy was correctly formulated in Article 214 of Stephen's Digest of the Criminal Law, 9th edition (1950). This states as follows:

Every publication is said to be blasphemous which contains any contemptuous, reviling, scurrilous or ludicrous matter relating to God, Jesus Christ or the Bible, or the formularies of the Church of England as by law established. It is not blasphemous to speak or publish opinions hostile to the Christian religion, or to deny the existence of God, if the publication is couched in decent and temperate language. The test to be applied is as to the manner in which the doctrines are advocated and not to the substance of the doctrines themselves.

In 1996 the European Court of Human Rights (case #19/1995/525/611) upheld a ban on Visions of Ecstasy, an erotic video about a 16th-century nun, based on the video infringing on the blasphemy law. The Court estimated that a limited ban on vulgar or obscene publications that would be offensive to believers, while keeping legal the criticism of religion, was compatible with the principles of a democratic society.

On May 8, 2008, the offence of blasphemy was abolished. However, some acts that were once viewed as blasphemous may now be prosecutable under other legislation, such as the Public Order Act 1986 as amended by the Racial and Religious Hatred Act 2006.

== See also ==
- Religion in the United Kingdom
- Religion in England
- Religion in Northern Ireland
- Religion in Scotland
- Religion in Wales
