= Alan King-Hamilton =

British barrister and judge (1904–2010)

His Honour Alan King-Hamilton QC

Personal details
- Born: 9 December 1904 West Hampstead, London, England
- Died: 23 March 2010 (aged 105)
- Spouse: Rosalind Irene Ellis (m. 1935; died 1991)
- Education: Trinity Hall, Cambridge

Myer Alan Barry King-Hamilton QC (9 December 1904 – 23 March 2010) was a British barrister and judge who was best known for hearing numerous high-profile cases at the Old Bailey during the 1960s and 1970s. These included the trial of Janie Jones in 1974 and the 1977 blasphemous libel trial against Gay News and its editor, Denis Lemon, for publishing "The Love That Dares to Speak Its Name", a poem by James Kirkup.

== Early life and career ==
King-Hamilton was born Myer Alan Barry Harris in West Hampstead, London on 9 December 1904, the youngest child and only son of solicitor Alfred Harris (1871-1959) and Constance Clyde Druiff (1877-1963). His father changed the family surname to King-Hamilton in 1916. King-Hamilton attended York House prep school and briefly The Haberdashers' Aske's Boys' School, but completed his schooling at Bishop's Stortford College. He read law at Trinity Hall, Cambridge, receiving a third-class BA degree in 1927. He later commented that "it is not essential or even important to get a First, or even a Second, to succeed at the Bar." Hamilton took his MA in 1929, the same year in which he was called to the Bar by the Middle Temple.

In 1935, he married Rosalind Irene Ellis (1906–1991), with whom he had two daughters. During his first few years at the Bar, King-Hamilton specialised in road traffic law before branching out into other areas.

== Military service ==
In 1939, King-Hamilton became a censor with the Ministry of Information and by 1945 had achieved the rank of squadron leader in Royal Air Force Intelligence. Upon demobilization, he returned to his legal career.

== Judicial career ==
After being appointed QC in 1954, King-Hamilton was appointed Recorder of Hereford from 1955 to 1965, of Gloucester from 1956 to 1961 and of Wolverhampton until 1964. In that year, he was appointed an additional judge of the Central Criminal Court, which led to his most notable reported cases.

=== Emil Savundra trial ===
Emil Savundra ran a fraudulent insurance company and had been exposed on television by David Frost. His 1968 trial for fraud, under King-Hamilton, led to his conviction and imprisonment for eight years. Despite this, King-Hamilton described Savundra as "What a man. How could one not admire his spirit?" in his memoirs, and would have had him as an imaginary dinner party guest, along with Cleopatra, Dame Edith Evans and others.

=== Janie Jones trial ===
King-Hamilton also presided over the 1973 trial of Janie Jones, a pop singer and madame, on charges of procuring women to become prostitutes, blackmail and perverting the course of justice. After the jury convicted her on the first and third charges, King-Hamilton sentenced Jones to seven years imprisonment, describing her as "the most evil woman he had ever met". Jones's own recollection was that he had said "of all the women I've ever tried, you are the most evil. I thought one woman was really evil, but you leave that woman in the shade."

=== Peter Hain trial ===
In 1976 Peter Hain, then leader of the Young Liberals, was charged with the robbery of £490 from a branch of Barclays Bank in Putney. He was acquitted on the ground of mistaken identity and later accused King-Hamilton of bias against him.

=== Gay News trial ===
A poem, The Love that Dares to Speak its Name, was published in the 3 June 1976 issue of Gay News. The poem, written from the viewpoint of a Roman centurion, graphically describes him having sex with Jesus after his crucifixion, and also claims that Jesus had had sex with numerous disciples, guards, and even Pontius Pilate.

Christian morality campaigner Mary Whitehouse initiated a private prosecution following the refusal of the Director of Public Prosecutions to take action. The trial, under the name Whitehouse v Lemon, was heard by King-Hamilton at the Old Bailey on 4 July 1977, with John Mortimer QC and Geoffrey Robertson representing Denis Lemon and John Smyth representing Whitehouse. On Monday 11 July, the jury found both defendants guilty. Gay News Ltd was fined £1,000, and Lemon was fined £500 and sentenced to nine months' imprisonment suspended for two years. King-Hamilton said that "it had been touch and go whether he would send Lemon to jail immediately. He would later say "It was a difficult summing up to prepare but I felt as if I had an influence over my left shoulder, I felt that I was being guided to put it helpfully to the jury... the previous prosecution was back in the early 1920s and did not give me much help."

After retiring in 1979, King-Hamilton acted as an arbitrator in the Channel 4 television series Case on Camera.

== Death ==
King-Hamilton died on 23 March 2010, at the age of 105.
