= John Gott =

John Gott may refer to:

- John William Gott (1866–1922), last person in Britain to be sent to prison for blasphemy
- Jon Gott (born 1985), gridiron football player
- John Gott (bishop) (1830–1906), Bishop of Truro, 1891–1906
- J. Richard Gott (born 1947), U.S. astrophysicist
