= Mary Whitehouse =

British conservative activist (1910–2001)

Mary Whitehouse CBE
- Whitehouse in 1981
- Born: Constance Mary Hutcheson; 13 June 1910; Nuneaton, Warwickshire, England
- Died: 23 November 2001 (aged 91); Colchester, Essex, England
- Education: Chester City Grammar School; Cheshire County Teacher Training College
- Organisation: National Viewers' and Listeners' Association
- Movement: Social conservatism; Nationwide Festival of Light
- Spouse: Ernest Raymond Whitehouse (m. 1940; died 2000)
- Children: 5

Constance Mary Whitehouse (née Hutcheson; 13 June 1910 – 23 November 2001) was a British teacher and conservative activist. She campaigned against social liberalism and the mainstream British media, both of which she accused of encouraging a more permissive society. She was the founder and first president of the National Viewers' and Listeners' Association, through which she led a longstanding campaign against the BBC. A hard-line social conservative, she was termed a reactionary by her socially liberal opponents. Her motivation derived from her Christian beliefs, her aversion to the rapid social and political changes in British society of the 1960s, and her work as a teacher of sex education.

Whitehouse became an art teacher, at the same time becoming involved in evangelical Christian groups such as the Student Christian Movement (which became increasingly more liberal leading up to, and after, a 1928 split with the Universities and Colleges Christian Fellowship) and Moral Re-Armament. She became a public figure via the Clean-Up TV pressure group, established in 1964, in which she was the most prominent figure. The following year she founded the National Viewers' and Listeners' Association, using it as a platform to criticise the BBC for what she perceived as a lack of accountability and excessive use of bad language and portrayals of sex and violence in its programmes. During the 1970s she broadened her activities and was a leading figure in the Nationwide Festival of Light, a Christian campaign that gained mass support for a period. She initiated a successful private prosecution against Gay News on the grounds of blasphemous libel, the first such case for more than 50 years. Another private prosecution, for gross indecency, was against the director of the play The Romans in Britain, which had been performed at the National Theatre.

Whitehouse's campaigns continue to divide opinion. Her critics have accused her of being a highly censorious, bigoted figure, and her traditional moral convictions brought her into direct conflict with advocates of the sexual revolution, feminism, children's rights, and LGBT rights. Supporters argue she was attempting to halt a decline in Britain's moral standards. According to Ben Thompson, the editor of an anthology of Whitehouse-related letters published in 2012, "From [...] feminist anti-pornography campaigns to the executive naming and shaming strategies of UK Uncut, her ideological and tactical influence has been discernible in all sorts of unexpected places in recent years."

== Early life ==
Whitehouse was born in Croft Road, Nuneaton, Warwickshire. In her autobiography, she claimed that the house later became a sex shop, although this is understood to have been either a falsehood or exaggeration, as it is instead RAM Newsagents, who were selling pornographic magazines, not a "sex shop" as she described. She was the second of four children of a "less-than-successful businessman" and a "necessarily resourceful mother". She won a scholarship to Chester City Grammar School, where she was keen on hockey and tennis, and after leaving she did two years of unpaid apprentice teaching at St John's School in Chester, Cheshire. At the Cheshire County Teacher Training College in Crewe, specialising in secondary school art teaching, she was involved with the Student Christian Movement before qualifying in 1932. She became an art teacher at Lichfield Road School in Wednesfield, where she stayed for eight years, and at Brewood Grammar School, both in Staffordshire.

She joined the Wolverhampton branch of the Oxford Group, later known as Moral Re-Armament (MRA), in 1935. At MRA meetings she met Ernest Raymond Whitehouse; they married at Chester on 23 March 1940 and remained married until he died in Colchester, Essex, aged 87, in 2000. The couple had five sons, two of whom (twins) died in infancy.

Whitehouse returned to teaching in 1953. That year she broadcast on Woman's Hour on the day before the coronation of Elizabeth II "as a loyal housewife and subject" and wrote an extensive article on homosexuality for The Sunday Times. According to Ben Thompson this concerned how a mother might "best avoid inadvertently pressuring her sons towards that particular orientation" and gained enough attention to be republished as a pamphlet.

She taught art and was senior mistress at Madeley Modern School in Madeley, Shropshire, from 1960, taking responsibility for sex education. Shocked at the moral beliefs of her pupils, she became concerned about what she and many others perceived as declining moral standards in the British media, especially in the BBC. She gave up teaching at the end of 1964 to concentrate on her campaigning.

== Clean Up TV campaign and the NVALA ==
=== Beginnings ===
Whitehouse began her activism in 1963 with a letter to the BBC requesting to see Hugh Greene, the BBC's Director-General. Greene was out of the country at the time, so she accepted an invitation to meet Harman Grisewood, his deputy, a Roman Catholic who she felt listened to her with understanding. Over the next few months though, she continued to be dissatisfied with what she saw on television.

With Norah Buckland, the wife of a vicar, she launched the Clean Up TV (CUTV) Campaign in January 1964 with a manifesto appealing to the "women of Britain". The campaign's first public meeting, on 5 May 1964, was held in Birmingham Town Hall. Richard Whitehouse, one of her sons, recalled in 2008: "Coaches arrived from all over the country. Two thousand people poured in and suddenly there was my mother on a podium inspiring them to rapturous applause. Her hands were shaking. But she didn't stop."

Although he regularly clashed with Whitehouse, the academic Richard Hoggart shared some of her opinions and was present on the platform with her at this meeting. The Times commented the following day: "Perhaps never before in the history of the Birmingham Town Hall has such a successful meeting been sponsored by such a flimsy organisation."

=== Sir Hugh Greene at the BBC ===
Hugh Greene, knighted in January 1964, became her bête noire. He was, according to Whitehouse, "the devil incarnate" who "more than anybody else ... [was] responsible for the moral collapse in this country." The CUTV manifesto asserted that the BBC under Greene spread "the propaganda of disbelief, doubt and dirt ... promiscuity, infidelity and drinking". In place of this, the authors argued, the corporation's activities should "encourage and sustain faith in God and bring Him back to the hearts of our family and national life." Interviewed by the Catholic Herald for its Christmas 1965 issue, Whitehouse thought the BBC loaded its programmes in favour of the 'new morality'. She commented about one unnamed television programme, believing it to be "unbalanced" and biased, in which "youngsters were asking questions [and] there was not a single member of the panel who was prepared to say outright that pre-marital relations were wrong. In fact, when a girl asked a clergyman, 'Do you think that fornication is sin?' he replied, 'It depends on what you mean by sin and what you mean by fornication.'" Whitehouse thought it was a "big hazard" for "present-day children" that "so many adults do not stand for anything" and affirmed that it was the responsibility of the BBC to have a "missionary role" to compensate for this social deficiency.

The Clean Up TV petition, using the manifesto, gained 500,000 signatures. Whitehouse complained in 1993 that during Greene's period at the BBC "hardly a week went by without a sniping reference to me". Whitehouse's critics responded quickly. The playwright David Turner had heckled her at Birmingham Town Hall; his work was criticised during the meeting. Within a few months, an episode of Swizzlewick, a twice-weekly serial he created, featured a parody of her as Mrs Smallgood.

In a speech Greene delivered in 1965 he argued, without naming Whitehouse directly, that the critics of his liberalisation of broadcasting policy would "attack whatever does not underwrite a set of prior assumptions" and saw the potential for "a dangerous form of censorship ... which works by causing artists and writers not to take risks". He defended the right of the BBC "to be ahead of public opinion". Greene ignored Whitehouse, blocked her from participation in BBC broadcasts, and purchased a painting of Whitehouse with five breasts by James Lawrence Isherwood.

The National Viewers' and Listeners' Association (later known as Mediawatch-UK) was launched to succeed CUTV in November 1965, with Whitehouse's then home in Claverley, Shropshire, hosting its first office, replacing what they themselves perceived as CUTV's negativity with an active campaign for legislative change. The former cabinet minister Bill Deedes, later editor of The Daily Telegraph, supported the group in that period and was the leading speaker at NVALA's founding conference in Birmingham on 30 April 1966, and acted as a contact between his parliamentary colleagues and Whitehouse. Quintin Hogg, better known as Lord Hailsham, was another high-profile politician who gave his support to NVALA and Whitehouse at that time.

Through the letters she frequently sent to Harold Wilson, the Prime Minister, Whitehouse caused particular difficulties for civil servants at 10 Downing Street. Reportedly, for some time Downing Street intentionally "lost" her letters to avoid having to respond to them. It has though been suggested that her contact with parliamentarians helped give her some leverage over the BBC which her own direct communication with the corporation's executives could not achieve. Although accepting the differences between them, Whitehouse wrote to Wilson on 1 January 1968: "You have always treated our approaches to you seriously and with courtesy."

Geoffrey Robertson, QC, suggests that when Greene left the BBC in 1969, contrary to the view that it was because of disagreements over the appointment of the Conservative Lord Hill as BBC chairman in 1967, whereby she could be given some credit for his departure, it was more to do with a political struggle between the BBC and the Labour Prime Minister, Wilson. However, Hill was prepared to meet Whitehouse at Broadcasting House.

=== Television and war ===
War coverage met with her objections. During his brief period as editor of Panorama (1965–66), Jeremy Isaacs received a letter from Whitehouse complaining about his decision to repeat Richard Dimbleby's coverage of the liberation of the Belsen concentration camp. She complained about this "filth" being allowed on air as "it was bound to shock and offend". In a 1994 interview, Whitehouse continued to maintain that it was "an awful intrusion" and "very off-putting".

Later in 1965, the decision by the BBC not to broadcast Peter Watkins' The War Game on 6 August 1965 led to Whitehouse writing to Sir Hugh Greene and Harold Wilson on 5 September, and again to the Home Secretary Frank Soskice on 6 October. In her view, a decision over whether to broadcast Watkins' film should be taken by the Home Office rather than the BBC. Nuclear war was "too serious a matter to be treated as entertainment. For a producer to be allowed, as now appears possible, to prejudice the effectiveness of our Civil Defence Services, or the ability of the British people to re-act with courage, initiative and control in a crisis, surely goes far beyond the responsibility" which should be given to someone in this role. The letter was leaked at the time and extracts were published.

The contemporary coverage of the Vietnam War, "the first 'television war'", demonstrated for Whitehouse that television was "an ally of pacifism". In a 1970 speech to the Royal College of Nursing she argued that "[h]owever good the cause ... the horrific effects on men and terrain of modern warfare as seen on the television screen could well sap the will of a nation to safeguard its own freedom, let alone resist the forces of evil abroad." Trying to reconcile this "pacifism" with her objection to fictional violence, she saw such news coverage as "desensitisation" in which the media use the "techniques of violence" to raise "impact" in order "to satisfy an apparently insatiable demand for realism".

=== Programmes: comedy and drama from the mid-1960s to 1980 ===
The situation comedy Till Death Us Do Part attacked many of the things Whitehouse cherished. She objected to its profane language: "I doubt if many people would use 121 bloodies in half-an-hour", and "Bad language coarsens the whole quality of our life. It normalises harsh, often indecent language, which despoils our communication."

Whitehouse and the NVALA won a libel action against the BBC and its writer Johnny Speight in July 1967 with a full apology and substantial damages, after Speight implied in a BBC radio interview that the organisation's members and its head were fascists. Shortly after Speight's interview, she was mocked in an episode of the series entitled "Alf's Dilemma" (27 February 1967). Alf Garnett is shown reading her book Cleaning Up TV, and agreeing with every word, but the episode ends with the book being burned to exclamations of "Unclean, unclean".

Whitehouse was critical of comedians such as Benny Hill and his use of dancers; she described Dave Allen as "offensive, indecent and embarrassing" after a comic account of a conversation following sexual intercourse. In return, comedy writers during this era saw her as possessing humorous potential. The Goodies comedy team created an episode ("Gender Education", 1971) with the principal objective of irritating her.

Whitehouse criticised the work of Dennis Potter from Son of Man (1969) onwards, arguing that the BBC was at the centre "of a conspiracy to remove the myth of god from the minds of men", and also A Clockwork Orange (1971). In the case of the violence in A Clockwork Orange, she rejected any attempt to show a 'copycat' correlation in academic studies, but urged its acceptance as a fact arrived at by common sense. In December 1974, she wrote of the "deliberate propagation" of the idea that there is no proof of the effects of television on "standards and behaviour". To reject its effect, and its ability to "declaim or pervert truth, is to deny the potency of communication itself, it is crazily to question the ability of education to affect the social conscience and to train the human mind".

Chuck Berry's novelty song "My Ding-a-Ling" was one of several pop songs to receive Whitehouse's disapproval in this period. She was unsuccessful in trying to persuade the BBC to ban it, but her campaign to stop Alice Cooper's "School's Out" being featured on Top of the Pops was successful. Cooper sent her a bunch of flowers, since he believed the publicity helped the song to reach number one. The NVALA had around 150,000 members at its peak, but claimed 30,000 in April 1977.

=== Doctor Who ===
Doctor Who met with her heaviest disapproval during Philip Hinchcliffe's tenure as producer between 1975 and 1977. She described the serial Genesis of the Daleks (1975) as consisting of "teatime brutality for tots", said The Brain of Morbius (1976) "contained some of the sickest and most horrific material seen on children's television", and on The Seeds of Doom (1976), in which the Doctor (Tom Baker) survives an encounter with a giant carnivorous plant monster, she commented: "Strangulation—by hand, by claw, by obscene vegetable matter—is the latest gimmick, sufficiently close up so they get the point. And just for a little variety, show the children how to make a Molotov cocktail."

Following her complaint about The Deadly Assassin (broadcast later in 1976), Whitehouse received an apology from the Director-General of the BBC, Sir Charles Curran. A freeze-frame cliffhanger ending to the third episode, in which the Doctor appeared to drown, was altered for repeat showings. The series' next producer, Graham Williams, was told to lighten the tone and reduce the violence following Whitehouse's complaints. Senior television executives commented that at this time her views were not disregarded lightly.

Philip Hinchcliffe later remarked, "I always felt that Mary Whitehouse thought of Doctor Who as a children's programme, for little children, and it wasn't ... so she was really coming at the show from the wrong starting-point."

=== After 1980 ===
Whitehouse criticised the ITV adventure/drama series Robin of Sherwood (1984–1986). Simon Farquhar, in an obituary for The Independent of the series' creator, Richard Carpenter, wrote that Whitehouse "objected to the [show's] relentless slaughter and blasphemous religious elements, but was deftly silenced by Carpenter in public when he introduced himself to her and the audience by saying "I'm Richard Carpenter, and I'm a professional writer. And you're a professional... what?"

Within a week of the launch of Channel 4 in November 1982, Whitehouse was objecting to swear words in the soap opera Brookside and two feature films the channel screened, Woodstock (1970) and Network (1976). On 25 November, she called for the resignation of the channel's chief executive, Jeremy Isaacs, over a scene in Brookside "in which a young thug had tried to force a schoolgirl to have sex with him", according to an item in The Times.

In 1984 Whitehouse won a case in the High Court against John Whitney, director-general of the Independent Broadcasting Authority, who had failed to forward the feature film Scum (1979) for consideration by other IBA board members to decide if Channel 4 should transmit it. The channel had screened the theatrical remake, based on a then-banned BBC television play, in June 1983. The High Court decision was overturned on appeal when it reached the House of Lords.

Whitehouse's supporters have asserted that her campaigns helped end Channel 4's "red triangle" series of films in 1986, so named after the warning preceding them which featured a red triangle with a white centre. The broadcasting of these films with the triangle had received criticism from opponents of Whitehouse.

In 1988, she made an extended appearance on the British TV discussion programme After Dark, alongside James Dearden, Shere Hite, Joan Wyndham, Naim Attallah and others. She was said to have had a role in the establishment of the Broadcasting Standards Council in 1988, which later became the Broadcasting Standards Commission and was subsumed into the Office of Communications in 2004.

In August 1989, in a broadcast of In the Psychiatrist's Chair on BBC Radio, Whitehouse confused the playwright Dennis Potter with his hero in The Singing Detective. She claimed that Potter's mother had "committed adultery with a strange man and that the shock of witnessing this had caused her son to be afflicted" with psoriatic arthropathy. Potter's mother won substantial damages from the BBC and The Listener. Whitehouse alleged she had a blackout at the interview's halfway point and claimed her comments were not intentional.

Some years earlier, Potter had publicly defended Whitehouse on several occasions without agreeing with her arguments.

Whitehouse stepped down as President of the National Viewers and Listeners Association in May 1994. Michael Grade, at the time the Chief Executive of Channel 4, reflected on her career:

I don't think she has had any effect at all. She never sees things in context. She will see something in an exploitation video and condemn it in the same breath as she will condemn a Dennis Potter classic. I respect her fortitude in fighting the battles over the years, trying to get her point of view across, but it is a point of view which would have totally destroyed British television if it had become the set of values by which we had commissioned programmes.

At the same time, William Rees-Mogg, Chairman of the Broadcasting Standards Commission, commented that she was "on the whole a force for the good, an important woman".

== Other campaigns and private prosecutions ==
=== Permissiveness ===
Whitehouse had taken up other campaigns against the permissive society by the early 1970s. She objected to the UK edition of The Little Red Schoolbook, "a manual of children's rights" on sex, drugs and attitudes to adults, which was successfully prosecuted for obscenity in July 1971. It was originally published in Denmark where, according to Whitehouse, it had done "incalculable damage" and was "a revolutionary primer", in which "open rebellion against the 'system', be it school, parents or authority generally, was openly advocated, while children were constantly exhorted to collect evidence against teachers of alleged injustices or anything which was likely to enhance revolution."

She was "greatly relieved—for the sake of the children" at the £50 fine and £115.50 costs imposed on Richard Handyside and Geoffrey Collins, its publishers, who also had works by Che Guevara and Fidel Castro on their small list of publications. For Whitehouse it was a "fundamental right of a child to be a child" and "the duty of mature people to ensure that childhood is protected against the inroads of those who would exploit its immaturity for political, social or personal gain." A modified second edition was allowed to be published in the UK, but the original verdict in the prosecution was sustained in the Appeal Court and the European Court of Human Rights (see Handyside v United Kingdom). An unexpurgated edition of the book, bar one minor cut, was published in the UK during July 2014.

Along with the (Catholic) Labour peer Lord Longford, Malcolm Muggeridge and Cliff Richard, Whitehouse was a leading figure in the Nationwide Festival of Light, which protested against the commercial exploitation of sex and violence. The Festival's mass "rally against permissiveness" in Trafalgar Square was attended by 50,000 people in September 1971. On 25 August that year she had had an audience with Pope Paul VI regarding 'moral pollution', in which she attempted to present the pontiff with Oz28 and the Little Red School Book, but these items found their way to an official of the Papal See instead. In his foreword to Whitehouse's book, Who Does She Think She Is? (1971), Malcolm Muggeridge wrote: "It is literally true that but for her the total demolition of all Christian decencies and values in this country would have taken place virtually without a word of public protest."

Following the release on appeal of the defendants in the Oz trial, "an unmitigated disaster for the children of our country", Whitehouse launched the Nationwide Petition for Public Decency in January 1972, which gained 1.35 million signatures by the time it was presented to the Prime Minister, Edward Heath, in April 1973. She had around 300 speaking engagements during the period of her highest profile. A tour of Australia in 1978 was met by counter-protests by feminists and others in various cities and she was hit with a cream pie in Brisbane. A pornographic magazine Whitehouse was launched in 1975 by publisher David Sullivan, who deliberately named it after her.

=== Opposition to paedophilia and child pornography ===
The Paedophile Information Exchange had been asked to help the Albany Trust, which received public money, to produce a booklet on paedophilia, which was to have been published by the Trust. Whitehouse mentioned the connection in a speech, asserting that public funds were being used to subsidise paedophile groups, and the Trust withdrew its support for the production of the pamphlet in 1977. However, PIE itself did not receive public funding.

Her subsequent petition against paedophilia and child pornography was signed by 1 1/2 million people. Whitehouse urged the Conservative opposition to push for a bill on the subject, in the absence of interest from the Labour government. The private member's bill proposed by Conservative MP Cyril Townsend became the Protection of Children Act 1978.

=== Gay News and other cases of alleged blasphemy ===
Whitehouse took private prosecutions in a number of cases where official action was not forthcoming. The action against Gay News in 1977 concerned "The Love That Dares to Speak Its Name", a poem by James Kirkup, a fellow of the Royal Society of Literature, the theme of which was the sexual fantasies of a Roman centurion about the body of Jesus Christ. She was the plaintiff in a charge of blasphemous libel against Gay News (Whitehouse v Lemon), a trial at the Old Bailey between 4 and 7 July 1977. It was the first prosecution for the offence since 1922. "I simply had to protect Our Lord", said Whitehouse at the time, Kirkup's poem being in her opinion "the recrucifixion of Christ by 20th-century weapons". The prosecution counsel John Smyth, representing Whitehouse, told the jury: "It may be said that this is a love poem—it is not, it is a poem about buggery", while the defence case was that the poem suggested all of mankind could love Jesus Christ. The Archbishop of Canterbury Donald Coggan and Cardinal Basil Hume both declined Whitehouse's invitation to give evidence at the trial.

Denis Lemon, the editor and owner of Gay News, published the poem in the 3–16 June 1976 issue on the basis that the "message and intention of the poem was to celebrate the absolute universality of God's love". Whitehouse told Michael Tracey and David Morrison, the authors of a book about her: "I think it shook me more than anything I had seen or come into contact with all the time I had been campaigning. ... I don't think Jesus Christ has ever been more real to me as a person than he was at that particular moment."

Gay News lost the case; the jury decided the case on a 10–2 majority. Lemon and his paper were fined, and Lemon received a nine-month suspended prison sentence. A Guardian editorial after the verdict said of the trial: "No evidence was called, or allowed to be called, about the merits of the poem in literature or theology", despite the case concerning blasphemy, or to suggest that Kirkup's intention had been to "scandalise" which, given the poet's "list of serious works", the newspaper thought should have been proven. The judge in at the prosecution, Alan King-Hamilton QC, had only allowed novelist Margaret Drabble and journalist Bernard Levin to appear as "character" witnesses for the newspaper. The Spectator editorial on 15 July commented: "The prosecution was perverse, the verdict misguided. As for the punishments, given that this was in effect a test case, they are excessive" and "left the law on obscenity even more muddled and confused than it was before, and have served no useful purpose whatsoever, except to delight Mrs Whitehouse". The Court of Appeal and the House of Lords dismissed appeals, although Lemon's suspended prison sentence was overturned.

The backlash that Whitehouse received led her to suggest that an "intellectual/homosexual/humanist lobby" was to blame, a comment that did not escape the attention of members of this as yet non-existent group. The Gay Humanist Group, later GALHA and now LGBT Humanists UK, came into being in 1979. Maureen Duffy, the group's honorary president, described the group as driven by an "ethics of compassion", best characterised "a fluid morality, based on a perception of fellowness, fellow feeling, fellow suffering". Ever since its foundation, LGBT Humanists UK has continued to organise events, assist those seeking asylum who are fleeing anti-LGBT+ prejudice and/or religious discrimination, and to provide a site of fellowship and community for non-religious LGBT+ communities in the UK.

Geoffrey Robertson, QC, the barrister for Gay News in the case, described Whitehouse as homophobic in The Times in 2008, saying: "Her fear of homosexuals was visceral". He describes the beliefs she reveals in her book, Whatever Happened to Sex?, as "nonsense", such as her assertion that "homosexuality was caused by abnormal parental sex 'during pregnancy or just after'", saying that for her, "being gay was like having acne: 'Psychiatric literature proves that 60 per cent of homosexuals who go for treatment get completely cured'".

Whitehouse had hoped to use the blasphemy laws against material other than Kirkup's poem and was interested in pursuing a possible action against allegedly blasphemous content for some time. She had hoped that it could be used as a basis for prosecution if Jens Jørgen Thorsen succeeded in his effort to produce the film The Many Faces of Jesus—which depicted Jesus engaged in sex acts with men and women—in the United Kingdom. The NVALA sent a translated copy of the screenplay to William Whitelaw, the shadow home secretary, and urged the Home Office to deny Thorsen entry. Whitehouse gained more widespread support regarding Thorsen than in the Gay News dispute. NVALA organised a publicity campaign, which resulted in Thorsen's intentions gaining significant public condemnation in September 1976 from leading public figures, including Queen Elizabeth II, who described the planned film as "obnoxious" in response to NVALA letters. In February 1977, Thorsen was denied entry to the United Kingdom after he arrived at Heathrow Airport carrying a copy of the Many Faces of Jesus screenplay. Home Secretary Merlyn Rees explained, to cheers in Parliament, that the action was "on the grounds that his exclusion was conducive to the public good".

Whitehouse and a letter writing campaign from the Festival of Light, after unsuccessfully lobbying the British Board of Film Censors (later the British Board of Film Classification) to refuse the film a certificate, were successful in persuading some councils in Britain to ban screenings of Monty Python's Life of Brian (1979) in their areas on unproven grounds that the film is blasphemous. Nearly a decade later, a threatened campaign by Whitehouse against Martin Scorsese's The Last Temptation of Christ (1988), with the law against blasphemy still in force at the time, failed to materialise.

=== The Romans in Britain ===
In 1982 she pursued a private prosecution against Michael Bogdanov, the director of a National Theatre production of Howard Brenton's The Romans in Britain, a play that "drew a direct parallel between the Roman invasion of Celtic Britain in 54 BC and the contemporary British presence in Northern Ireland". The first act contains "a brief scene" of (simulated) anal rape—the police had visited the production three times and found no basis for legal action. In the prosecution Whitehouse's counsel claimed Section 13 of the Sexual Offences Act 1956, which described the offence of "procuring an act of gross indecency", was applicable. Because this was a general Act, there was no possibility of defence on the basis of artistic merit, unlike that permitted under the Obscene Publications Act 1959.

Since Whitehouse had not seen the play, the prosecution evidence rested on the testimony of her solicitor, Graham Ross-Cornes, who claimed he saw the actor's penis. However, cross-examination revealed that he had seen a performance of the play from the back row of the stalls, 90 feet from the stage. Lord Hutchinson, counsel for Bogdanov, was able to demonstrate the nature of the illusion performed on stage. This was achieved by suggesting that it might have been the actor's thumb protruding from his fist, rather than his erect penis. The defence had argued that the Act did not apply to the theatre; the judge Mr Justice Staughton then ruled that it did. After three days, the action was withdrawn after the prosecution counsel told Whitehouse that he was unable to continue with the case; the litigation was ended by the Attorney General putting forward a plea of nolle prosequi. Both sides claimed a victory; Whitehouse's side asserted that the important legal point had been made with the ruling on the applicability of the Sexual Offences Act 1956, while Bogdanov said it was because she knew that he would not be convicted. Whitehouse had to meet £20,000 costs, most of which was paid by an anonymous donor.

Whitehouse's account of the trial is recorded in A Most Dangerous Woman (ISBN 0-85648-540-3); she wrote that she was of the opinion that the legal point had been established, and they had no wish to criminalise Bogdanov, the play's director.

=== Margaret Thatcher's government ===
By the 1980s, Whitehouse had found a powerful ally in the Conservative government, particularly in Margaret Thatcher herself, whose support base partially consisted of social conservatives. It has been claimed by the Conservative journalist Bruce Anderson that the market orientation of the Thatcher government prejudiced it against Whitehouse in private.

It has been claimed by commentators not necessarily in agreement with her that Whitehouse's efforts played a part in the passage of the Protection of Children Act 1978, the Indecent Displays (Control) Act 1981, which concerned sex shops, and the Video Recordings Act 1984, which banned 'video nasties', a term reportedly coined by Whitehouse. She screened edited highlights from these films for MPs at the House of Commons in late 1983, which included extracts from The Evil Dead (1981) considered by her "the number one nasty". It was "a highly effective means of lobbying the government to introduce tight state controls on the burgeoning video industry".

Around 1986, papers released in late December 2014 indicate, Whitehouse met Thatcher on at least two occasions to discuss the possibility of banning sex toys using a potential extension of the "deprave and corrupt" provision in the Obscene Publications Act 1959. The plan was abandoned because the Home Secretary, Leon Brittan, thought the concept of public taste would be a problematic concept for legal action.

== Later years and assessments of her influence ==
Whitehouse was appointed a CBE in the 1980 Birthday Honours. In 1988, she suffered a spinal injury in a fall, which severely curbed her campaigning activities. Whitehouse retired as president of the NVALA in 1994. She died, aged 91, in a nursing home in Colchester, Essex, on 23 November 2001. Whitehouse is buried in the churchyard of the parish church of St Mary the Virgin in Dedham in Essex.

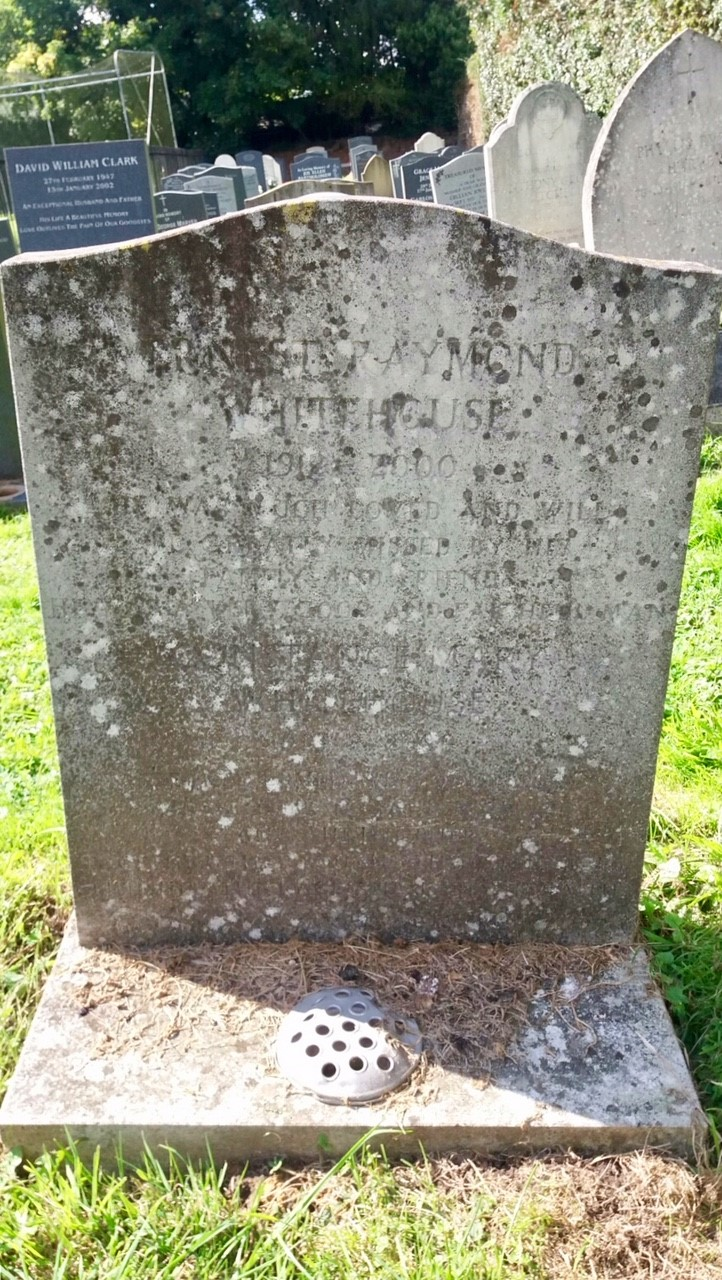
The grave of Mary Whitehouse's husband, Ernest Raymond Whitehouse

The journalist Mary Kenny believes "Mary Whitehouse was a significant figure. Some of her battles were justified, even prophetic. Today her attacks on 'kiddie porn' would be widely supported." The academic Richard Hoggart observed: "her main focus was on sex, followed by bad language and violence. Odd: if she had reversed the order, she might have been more effective."

Writing in the Dictionary of National Biography, the philosopher Mary Warnock opined, "Even if her campaigning did not succeed in 'cleaning up TV', still less in making it more fit to watch in other ways, she was of serious intent, and was an influence for good at a crucial stage in the development both of the BBC and of ITV. She was not, as the BBC seemed officially to proclaim, a mere figure of fun."

The papers of the NVALA for 1970–1990 have been deposited at the library of the University of Essex.

Whitehouse's early campaign and her disagreements with the BBC under Greene were the basis of a drama first broadcast in 2008 entitled Filth: The Mary Whitehouse Story, written by Amanda Coe. Julie Walters played Whitehouse, Alun Armstrong played her husband, Ernest, and Hugh Bonneville played Greene.

Her favourite programmes were Dixon of Dock Green (winner of NVALA's Best Family Viewing Award in 1967), Neighbours, and coverage of snooker. She had privately expressed gratitude to Dennis Potter and the BBC for his television play Where Adam Stood in 1976.

In 1984 the NVALA gave an award to Antony Jay and Jonathan Lynn, writers of the situation comedy Yes Minister, and Thatcher, who had declared the show her favourite programme, presented the award. Whitehouse sat laughing next to Thatcher as the Prime Minister acted out a sketch, written principally by her press secretary, Bernard Ingham, alongside a reluctant Paul Eddington and Nigel Hawthorne, the lead actors in the programme. In accepting the award, Lynn thanked Whitehouse and the NVALA and congratulated Thatcher for "taking her rightful place in the world of situation comedy".

In 1989 a sketch comedy show began on BBC Radio 1 called The Mary Whitehouse Experience, starring alternative comedians David Baddiel, Rob Newman, Steve Punt and Hugh Dennis. The title was an oblique reference to Whitehouse's campaigning against her perception of declining values on TV and radio, although she was rarely satirised directly. The show later transferred to television and made household names of its four protagonists.

In 2017, in episode 15 of Endeavour, "Canticle", the character Mrs Pettibon is loosely based on Mary Whitehouse.

The two-part BBC Two documentary Banned! The Mary Whitehouse Story, shown in March and April 2022, looks back on Whitehouse's life. It features contributions from Gyles Brandreth, Michael Grade, Beatrix Campbell, Ken Loach, Peter Bradshaw, Ben Thompson, Peter Tatchell and David Sullivan.

== See also ==
- Censorship
- Pornography
- "Mary Long", a song in Deep Purple's 1973 album Who Do We Think We Are
- "Pigs (Three Different Ones)", a song in Pink Floyd's 1977 album Animals, which mentions Whitehouse.
- Whitehouse (band)
- "Up Against the Wall", a song in Tom Robinson Band's 1978 album Power in the Darkness references Whitehouse
