= Leslie Scarman, Baron Scarman =

English judge (1911–2004)

The Right Honourable The Lord Scarman OBE PC
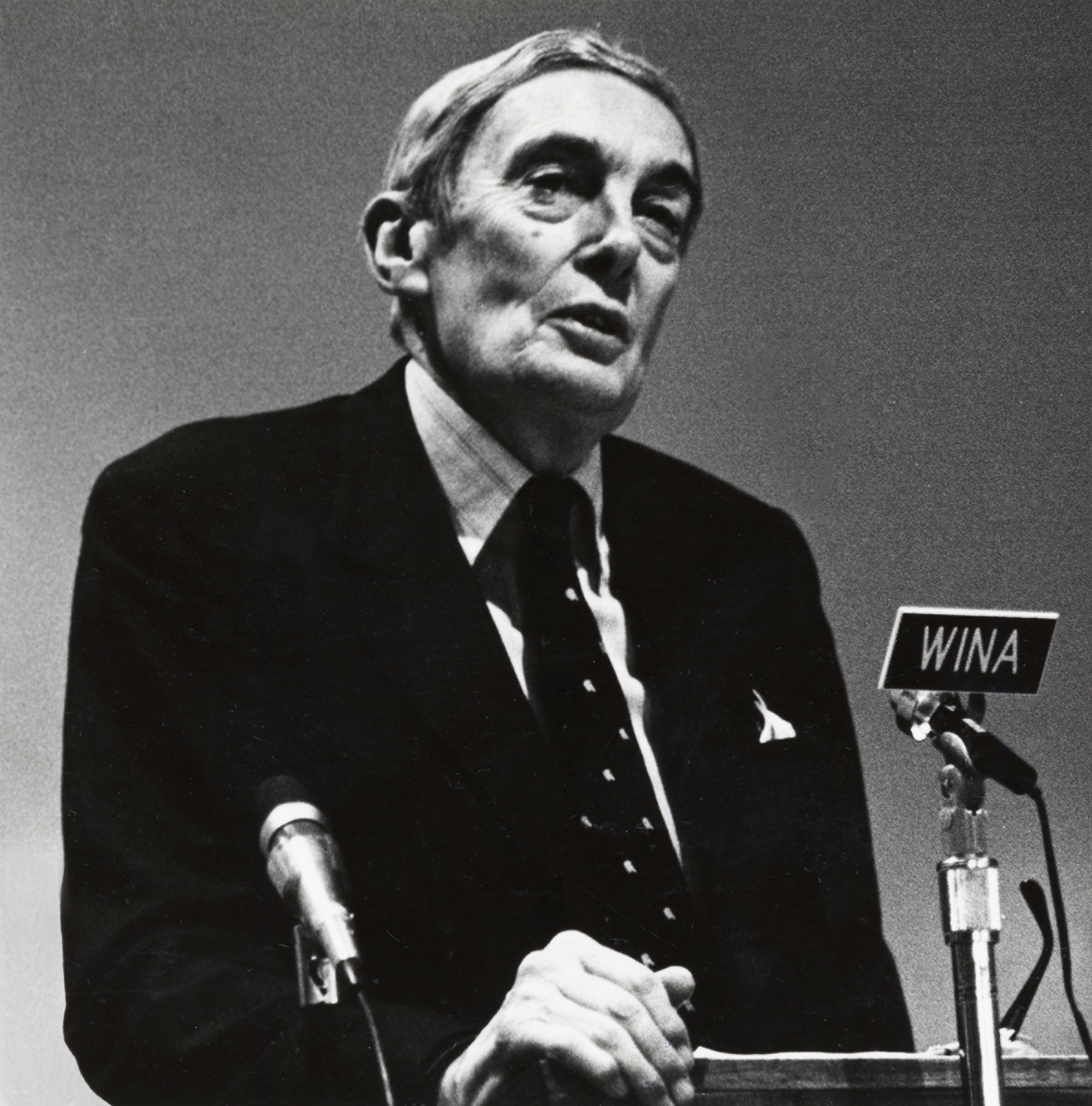
- Born: Leslie George Scarman; 29 July 1911; Streatham, London, England
- Died: 8 December 2004 (aged 93); Westgate-on-Sea Kent, England
- Resting place: St Mary Magdeline Church, Monkton, Kent, England
- Education: Brasenose College, Oxford
- Occupations: Judge; barrister
- Title: Lord of Appeal in Ordinary
- Term: 1977–1986
- Spouse: Ruth Wright (m. 1947)
- Children: 1

Member of the House of Lords
- Lord Temporal
- Lord of Appeal in Ordinary; 30 September 1977 – 8 December 2004

Leslie George Scarman, Baron Scarman, OBE, PC (29 July 1911 – 8 December 2004) was an English judge and barrister who served as a Law Lord until his retirement in 1986. He was described as an "outstanding judicial figure, entrusted with the most high-profile inquiries and marked by his integrity".

== Early life and education ==
Scarman was born in Streatham but grew up on the border of Sussex and Surrey. He won scholarships to Radley College and then Brasenose College, Oxford, where he read Classics, graduating in 1932 with a double first.

== Legal career ==
He was called to the bar at the Middle Temple in 1936. He remained briefless until World War II, which he spent in the Royal Air Force as a staff officer in England, North Africa, and then continental Europe. He was present with Arthur Tedder when Alfred Jodl surrendered at Reims. He was appointed an Officer of the Order of the British Empire (OBE) in 1944. He returned to law in 1945, practising from chambers at 2, Crown Office Row, known since the 1970s as Fountain Court Chambers, and in the late 1940s and early 1950s he started to build the chambers' reputation for commercial litigation, together with Alan Orr and Melford Stevenson, supported by a notable clerk, Cyril Batchelor. He became a Queen's Counsel in 1957.

Scarman was appointed a High Court judge in 1961, assigned to the Probate, Divorce and Admiralty Division, transferring to the Family Division when the latter was created in 1971. On his appointment he received the customary knighthood. He joined the Court of Appeal in 1973, and was sworn of the Privy Council. On 30 September 1977, Scarman was made a Lord of Appeal in Ordinary, becoming Baron Scarman, of Quatt in the County of Salop. He served in the Lords until his retirement in 1986.

He was appointed head of the Law Commission from 1965 to 1973, during which time 27 commission-inspired statutes were made law. As a judge, Scarman's career had some controversial decisions. Although widely regarded as a liberal, he upheld the blasphemy conviction of Gay News (1979), punctured the GLC's Fares Fair low-cost public transport policy (1981) and supported the banning of trade unions at GCHQ (1985).

He presided over the 1972 inquiry into the Northern Ireland riots of August 1969 and the public inquiry on the causes of the race riots in Brixton in 1981. He also chaired the Red Lion Square disorders (1975) and the Grunwick dispute (1977) inquiries.

== Later life ==
After entering the House of Lords the more liberal aspects of his character dominated: he was chancellor of the University of Warwick and president of the British Institute of Human Rights, and worked on behalf of the Prince's Trust, the Birmingham Six and Charter 88. Scarman was elected to the American Philosophical Society in 1983. In 1991 he set up the Scarman Trust aimed at helping young people from deprived communities.

== Personal life and death ==
He married Ruth Wright in 1947, with whom he had one son. He died in 2004 at his home in Westgate-on-Sea.

== Notable judgments ==
- Crabb v Arun District Council [1975] EWCA Civ 7
- Whitehouse v Lemon; Whitehouse v Gay News Ltd [1979] AC 406, [1979] 2 WLR 281, [1979] 1 All ER 898
- Pao On v Lau Yiu Long [1980] AC 614
- Sidaway v Board of Governors of the Bethlem Royal Hospital [1985] AC 871

== In popular culture ==
Scarman appeared in the final episode of series one of the BBC1 drama Ashes to Ashes, played by Geoffrey Palmer.

Academic offices
Preceded by The Viscount Radcliffe	Chancellor of the University of Warwick; 1977–1989	Succeeded by Shridath Ramphal
