= Whitehouse v Lemon =

1976 blasphemy court case in the United Kingdom

Whitehouse v Lemon is a 1976 court case involving the blasphemy law in the United Kingdom. It was the last successful blasphemy trial in the UK.

== "The Love That Dares to Speak Its Name" ==
"The Love That Dares to Speak Its Name" is a poem by James Kirkup. It is written from the viewpoint of a Roman centurion who describes having sex with Jesus after his crucifixion, and also says that Jesus had had sex with other men including disciples, guards, and Pontius Pilate. The poem itself was considered of low artistic value, both by critics and the author himself. The title alludes to the phrase "the love that dare not speak its name", made famous in Regina v Wilde.

In 1976, the poem was published in Gay News, with an accompanying illustration.

== Prosecution ==
In early November 1976, Mary Whitehouse obtained a copy of the poem and announced her intention to bring a private prosecution against the magazine. Leave to bring this prosecution was granted on 9 December 1976. The charges named Gay News Ltd and Denis Lemon as the publishers. A charge against Moore Harness Ltd for distributing was subsequently dropped. The indictment described the offending publication as "a blasphemous libel concerning the Christian religion, namely an obscene poem and illustration vilifying Christ in his life and in his crucifixion".

The Gay News Fighting Fund was set up in December 1976. Judge Alan King-Hamilton QC heard the trial at the Old Bailey on 4 July 1977, with John Mortimer QC and Geoffrey Robertson QC representing the accused and John Smyth representing Mary Whitehouse.

=== Verdict and sentence ===
On Monday 11 July, the jury found both defendants guilty. Gay News Ltd was fined £1,000. (Note: £1,000 in 1976 equates to approximately £7,000 in 2025, according to calculations based on the Consumer Price Index measure of inflation.) Denis Lemon was fined £500 and sentenced to nine months' imprisonment, suspended. (Note: £500 in 1976 equates to approximately £3,000 in 2025, according to calculations based on the Consumer Price Index measure of inflation.) It had been "touch and go", said the judge, whether he would actually send Denis Lemon to jail.

Mary Whitehouse's costs of £7,763 were ordered to be paid four-fifths by Gay News Ltd and one-fifth by Lemon. (Note: £7,763 in 1976 equates to approximately £52,000 in 2025, according to calculations based on the Consumer Price Index measure of inflation.)

=== Appeals ===
Gay News Ltd and Denis Lemon appealed against conviction and sentence. On 17 March 1978, the Court of Appeal quashed Denis Lemon's suspended prison sentence but upheld the convictions on the basis that the law of blasphemy had been developed before mens rea, literally, a "guilty mind", became an essential element of a crime.

Gay News readers voted by a majority of 20 to 1 in favour of appealing to the House of Lords. The Law Lords heard the appeal against conviction and delivered their judgement on 21 February 1979.

At issue was whether or not the offence of blasphemous libel required specific intent of committing such a blasphemy. By a majority of 3 to 2, the Lords concluded that intention was not required. Lord Scarman was of the opinion that blasphemy laws should cover all religions and not just Christianity and sought strict liability for those who "cause grave offence to the religious feelings of some of their fellow citizens or are such as to tend to deprave and corrupt persons who are likely to read them". The appeal was lost.

The European Commission of Human Rights declared the case inadmissible to be heard by the European Court of Human Rights on 7 May 1982. The £26,435 raised by the Gay News Fighting Fund through benefits and donations from the gay community and others, (Note: £26,435 in 1982 equates to approximately £94,000 in 2025, according to calculations based on the Consumer Price Index measure of inflation.) including a £500 donation from Monty Python, (Note: £500 in 1982 equates to approximately £2,000 in 2025, according to calculations based on the Consumer Price Index measure of inflation.) was sufficient to cover the costs of the trial and appeals.

== Abolition of blasphemous libel as an offence ==
On 5 March 2008, an amendment was passed to the Criminal Justice and Immigration Act 2008 which abolished the common law offences of blasphemy and blasphemous libel in England and Wales. The peers also voted for the laws to be abandoned during March. The Act received royal assent on 8 May 2008, and the relevant section came into force on 8 July 2008.

== Later appearances of the poem ==
In 1996, the Lesbian and Gay Christian Movement was investigated by the police after publishing a hyperlink to the Queer Resources Directory, an American website, that included a copy of the poem. In April 1997 the police declared that they did not intend to prosecute. The investigation was commented on by civil liberties groups as raising issues about whether linking legally constituted publication. However, it did not produce a legal precedent on the question as it did not go to court.

In 2002, a deliberate and well-publicised public repeat reading of the poem took place on the steps of St Martin-in-the-Fields church in Trafalgar Square, London, without any incidents. Kirkup criticised the politicising of his poem.

== See also ==
- John William Gott
- List of works depicting Jesus as LGBT
- The Romans in Britain
