= Religious offense =

Action offending religious sensibilities and arousing negative emotions

Religious offenses are actions that are considered to violate religious sensibilities and arouse negative emotions in people with strong religious beliefs. Traditionally, there are three unique types of acts that are considered to be religious offenses:

- Heresy (wrong choice) means questioning or doubting dogmatic established beliefs.
- Blasphemy (evil-speaking) is the act of insulting or showing contempt for a religious deity.
- Apostasy (revolt or renunciation) implies the abandonment of a prescribed religious duty (i.e. disloyalty, sedition or defection)

Sacrilege is the violation or injurious treatment of a sacred object, site or person.

Individuals in any given religious community may be sensitive to different things in different measures, particularly in relation to topics such as sexuality, infancy, society, and warfare. Religious offense can be caused deliberately or motivated by religious intolerance, especially between specific religious beliefs regarding "sacred truth". However, every religion is essentially a set of beliefs conveyed from generation to generation which are, by religious definition, held to be immutable truths by that religion's believers or followers. Anything that tends to weaken or break that chain of authoritative continuity is likely to be deemed offensive and, in some jurisdictions, severely punishable.

The notion that freedom of speech and the absence of censorship should allow religious practices or beliefs to be criticized is also a cause of conflict. The use or misuse of religious paraphernalia, particularly scripture, may also cause offense.

== Legal ==
Blasphemy laws were once almost universal, and are still common in states with strong religious traditions, but such restrictions have been extinguished in most secular jurisdictions that incorporate the principles of the Universal Declaration of Human Rights.

Article 18 of the UDHR allows "the right to "freedom of thought, conscience and religion; this right includes freedom to change religion or belief, and freedom, either alone or in community with others and in public or private, to manifest religion or belief in teaching, practice, worship and observance"; and Article 19 allows "the right to freedom of opinion and expression; this right includes freedom to hold opinions without interference and to seek, receive and impart information and ideas through any media and regardless of frontiers".

With these two articles, Article 18 of the UDHR allows people to hold and express religious ideas and other beliefs (or a lack of religious belief) that may be offensive to others or to the majority of citizens, and Article 19 explicitly mandates freedom of speech, per which citizens are to be permitted to criticize leaders, even if some religious people may find such criticism seriously offensive.

Some extreme religious leaders in such secular societies campaign for the offence of blasphemy to be reinstated in order to enforce respect for their various religious beliefs above any scientific or moral challenge.

In some jurisdictions, any challenge to divine authority may be deemed homologous to treason and subject to serious forms of punishment, typically the death penalty. There is a fine line between the ideas of fair comment and religious offences caused by questioning the veracity of divine revelation. More recently, the term religious hatred is used in modern laws such as the British Racial and Religious Hatred Act 2006, which aim to promote religious tolerance by forbidding hate crimes.

== See also ==
- Censorship by religion
- Criticism of Christianity
- Criticism of Islam
- Criticism of religion
- Sacred-profane dichotomy
- Secularity
- The Satanic Verses
