= Blasphemy =

Act of insulting of religion

Blasphemy is an insult that shows contempt, disrespect or lack of reverence concerning a deity, an object considered sacred, or something that is considered inviolable. Some religions, especially Abrahamic ones, regard blasphemy as a crime, including insulting the Islamic prophet Muhammad in Islam, speaking the sacred name in Judaism, and blasphemy of God's Holy Spirit, which is an eternal sin in Christianity. It was also a crime under English common law, and it is still a crime under Italian law (Art. 724 del Codice Penale).

In the early history of the Church, blasphemy "was considered to show active disrespect to God and to involve the use of profane cursing or mockery of his powers". Motivations behind this come from disagreement with the Church, feelings of hopelessness or Church abandonment, or feelings of confinement. In the medieval world, those who committed blasphemy were seen as needing discipline. By the 17th century, several historically Christian countries had legislation against blasphemy. Blasphemy was proscribed speech in the U.S. until well into the 20th century. Blasphemy laws were abolished in England and Wales in 2008, and in Ireland in 2020. Scotland repealed its blasphemy laws in 2021. Many other countries have abolished blasphemy laws including Denmark, the Netherlands, Iceland, Norway and New Zealand. As of 2019, 40 percent of the world's countries have blasphemy laws on the books, including 18 countries in the Middle East and North Africa, or 90% of countries in that region.

== Etymology ==
The word blasphemy came via Middle English blasfemen and Old French blasfemer and Late Latin blasphemare from Greek βλασφημέω, from βλασ, "injure" and φήμη, "utterance, talk, speech". From blasphemare also came Old French blasmer, from which the English word blame came. Blasphemy: 'from Gk. blasphemia "a speaking ill, impious speech, slander," from blasphemein "to speak evil of." "In the sense of speaking evil of God this word is found in Ps. 74:18; Isa. 52:5; Rom. 2:24; Rev. 13:1, 6; 16:9, 11, 21. It denotes also any kind of calumny, or evil-speaking, or abuse (1 Kings 21:10 LXX; Acts 13:45; 18:6, etc.)."

== History ==
=== Middle Ages ===
Heresy received more attention than blasphemy throughout the Middle Ages because it was considered a more serious threat to Orthodoxy, while blasphemy was mostly seen as irreverent remarks made by persons who may have been drunk or diverged from good standards of conduct in isolated incidents of misbehavior. When the fundamental understanding of the sacred became more contentious during the Reformation, blasphemy started to be regarded as similar to heresy.

The intellectual culture of the early English Enlightenment embraced ironic or scoffing tones in contradistinction to the idea of sacredness in revealed religion. The characterization of "scoffing" as blasphemy was defined as profaning the Scripture by irreverent "Buffoonery and Banter". From at least the 18th century on, the clergy of the Church of England justified blasphemy prosecutions by distinguishing "sober reasoning" from mockery and scoffing. Religious doctrine could be discussed "in a calm, decent and serious way" (in the words of Bishop Gibson) but mockery and scoffing, they said, were appeals to sentiment, not to reason.

=== Common law ===
It was a common law crime according to William Blackstone's Commentaries on the Laws of England:

Blasphemy against the Almighty is denying his being or providence, or uttering conteumelious reproaches on our Savior Christ. It is punished, at common law by fine and imprisonment, for Christianity is part of the laws of the land".

In 1636, the Puritan-controlled Massachusetts Bay Colony made blasphemy – defined as "a cursing of God by atheism, or the like" – punishable by death. The last person hanged for blasphemy in Great Britain was Thomas Aikenhead aged 20, in Scotland in 1697. He was prosecuted for denying the veracity of the Old Testament and the legitimacy of Christ's miracles.

In the United States, blasphemy was recognized as proscribed speech well into the 20th-century. The Constitution entailed a right to articulate views on religion, but not to commit blasphemy, with the Harvard Law Review stating, "The English common law had punished blasphemy as a crime, while excluding "disputes between learned men upon particular controverted points" from the scope of criminal blasphemy. Looking to this precedent, 19th-century American appellate courts consistently upheld proscriptions on blasphemy, drawing a line between punishable blasphemy and protected religious speech."

The common law offences of blasphemy and blasphemous libel were repealed in England & Wales by the Criminal Justice and Immigration Act 2008. In the 18th and 19th centuries, this meant that promoting atheism could be prosecuted. The last successfully prosecuted case was Whitehouse v. Lemon (1976) where the court repeated what had by then become a textbook standard for blasphemy law cases in the UK:

It is not blasphemous to speak or publish opinions hostile to the Christian religion, or to deny the existence of God, if the publication is couched in decent and temperate language. The test to be applied is as to the manner in which the doctrines are advocated and not as to the substance of the doctrines themselves.

The common law offense of blasphemy was abolished in Scotland via the Hate Crime and Public Order (Scotland) Act 2021.

In Norway, the Norwegian Law from 1687 prescribed death penalty for blasphemy, but during the 1700's, the punishment for blasphemy became less severe. The last time someone was accused of blasphemy in a Norwegian court was in 1933. The last remainder of the blasphemy paragraph was abolished in 2015.

== By religion ==
=== Christianity ===
==== Biblical texts ====
Christian theology condemns blasphemy. "Thou shalt not take the name of the Lord thy God in vain", one of the Ten Commandments, forbids blasphemy, which Christians regard as "an affront to God's holiness".

Leviticus 24:16 states that "anyone who blasphemes the name of Yahweh will be put to death".

In Mark 3:29, blaspheming the Holy Spirit is spoken of as unforgivable—an eternal sin.

==== Church history ====
In the early history of the Church, blasphemy "was considered to show active disrespect to God and to involve the use of profane cursing or mockery of his powers".

In The Whole Duty of Man, sometimes attributed to Richard Allestree or John Fell, blasphemy is described as "speaking any evil Thing of God", and as "the highest Degree whereof is cursing him; or if we do not speak it with our Mouths, yet if we do it in our Hearts, by thinking any unworthy Thing of him, it is look'd on by God, who sees the Heart, as the vilest Dishonour."

- Thomas Aquinas says that "[if] we compare murder and blasphemy as regards the objects of those sins, it is clear that blasphemy, which is a sin committed directly against God, is more grave than murder, which is a sin against one's neighbor. On the other hand, if we compare them in respect of the harm wrought by them, murder is the graver sin, for murder does more harm to one's neighbor, than blasphemy does to God".
- The Book of Concord calls blasphemy "the greatest sin that can be outwardly committed".
- The Baptist Confession of Faith says: "Therefore, to swear vainly or rashly by the glorious and awesome name of God…is sinful, and to be regarded with disgust and detestation. …For by rash, false, and vain oaths, the Lord is provoked and because of them this land mourns".
- The Heidelberg Catechism answers question 100 about blasphemy by stating that "no sin is greater or provokes God's wrath more than the blaspheming of His Name".
- The Westminster Larger Catechism explains that "The sins forbidden in the third commandment are, the abuse of it in an ignorant, vain, irreverent, profane...mentioning...by blasphemy...to profane jests, ...vain janglings, ...to charms or sinful lusts and practices".
- Calvin found it intolerable "when a person is accused of blasphemy, to lay the blame on the ebullition of passion, as if God were to endure the penalty whenever we are provoked".

==== Catholic prayers and reparations for blasphemy ====
In the Catholic Church, there are specific prayers and devotions as Acts of Reparation for blasphemy. For instance, The Golden Arrow Holy Face Devotion (Prayer) first introduced by Sister Marie of St Peter in 1844 is recited "in a spirit of reparation for blasphemy". This devotion (started by Sister Marie and then promoted by the Venerable Leo Dupont) was approved by Pope Leo XIII in 1885. The Raccoltabook includes a number of such prayers. The Five First Saturdays devotions are done with the intention in the heart of making reparation to the Blessed Mother for blasphemies against her, her name and her holy initiatives.

The Holy See has specific "Pontifical organizations" for the purpose of the reparation of blasphemy through Acts of Reparation to Jesus Christ, e.g. the Pontifical Congregation of the Benedictine Sisters of the Reparation of the Holy Face.

==== Disputation of Paris ====
During the Middle Ages a series of debates on Judaism were staged by the Catholic Church, including the Disputation of Paris (1240), the Disputation of Barcelona (1263), and Disputation of Tortosa (1413–14), and during those disputations, Jewish converts to Christianity, such as Nicholas Donin (in Paris) and Pablo Christiani (in Barcelona) claimed the Talmud contained insulting references to Jesus.

The Disputation of Paris, also known as the Trial of the Talmud, took place in 1240 at the court of the reigning king of France, Louis IX (St. Louis). It followed the work of Nicholas Donin, a Jewish convert to Christianity, who translated the Talmud and pressed 35 charges against it to Pope Gregory IX by quoting a series of alleged blasphemous passages about Jesus, Mary or Christianity. Four rabbis defended the Talmud against Donin's accusations. A commission of Christian theologians condemned the Talmud to be burned and on 17 June 1244, twenty-four carriage loads of Jewish religious manuscripts were set on fire in the streets of Paris. The translation of the Talmud from Hebrew to non-Jewish languages stripped Jewish discourse from its covering, something that was resented by Jews as a profound violation.

Between 1239 and 1775, the Roman Catholic Church at various times either forced the censoring of parts of the Talmud that it considered theologically problematic or the destruction of copies of the Talmud. During the inquisition, sects deemed heretical such as the Waldensians were also charged with blasphemy.

=== Islam ===
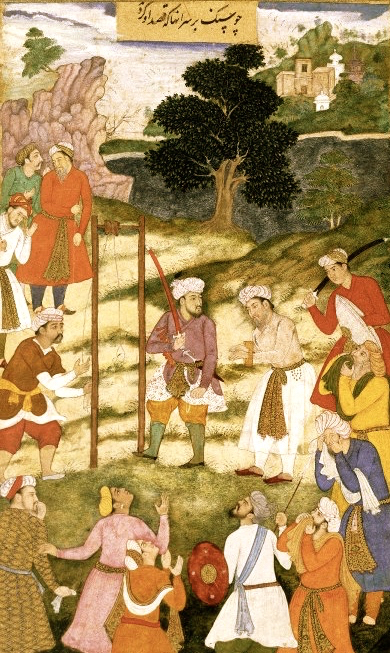
Sufi teacher Mansur Al-Hallaj was executed in Baghdad amid political intrigue and charges of blasphemy in 922.

==== Punishment and definition ====
Blasphemy in Islam is impious utterance or action concerning God, Muhammad or anything considered sacred in Islam. The Quran admonishes blasphemy, but does not specify any worldly punishment for blasphemy. The hadiths, which are another source of Sharia, suggest various punishments for blasphemy, which may include death. However, it has been argued that the death penalty applies only to cases where there is treason involved that may seriously harm the Muslim community, especially during times of war. Different traditional schools of jurisprudence prescribe different punishment for blasphemy, depending on whether the blasphemer is Muslim or non-Muslim, a man or a woman. In the modern Muslim world, the laws pertaining to blasphemy vary by country, and some countries prescribe punishments consisting of fines, imprisonment, flogging, hanging, or beheading. Blasphemy laws were rarely enforced in pre-modern Islamic societies, but in the modern era some states and radical groups have used charges of blasphemy in an effort to burnish their religious credentials and gain popular support at the expense of liberal Muslim intellectuals and religious minorities. In recent years, accusations of blasphemy against Islam have sparked international controversies and played part in incidents of mob violence and assassinations of prominent figures.

==== Failed OIC anti-blasphemy campaign at UN ====
The campaign for worldwide criminal penalties for the "defamation of religions" had been spearheaded by Organisation of Islamic Cooperation (OIC) on behalf of the United Nations' large Muslim bloc. The campaign ended in 2011 when the proposal was withdrawn in Geneva, in the Human Rights Council because of lack of support, marking an end to the effort to establish worldwide blasphemy strictures along the lines of those in Pakistan, Saudi Arabia, and Iran. This resolution had passed every year since 1999, in the United Nations, with declining number of "yes" votes with each successive year. In the early 21st century, blasphemy became an issue in the United Nations (UN). The United Nations passed several resolutions which called upon the world to take action against the "defamation of religions". However, in July 2011, the UN Human Rights Committee (UNHRC) released a 52-paragraph statement which affirmed the freedom of speech and rejected the laws banning "display of lack of respect for a religion or other belief system'.

==== Depictions of Muhammad ====
When the Danish newspaper Jyllands-Posten decided to publish cartoons of Muhammad, its editor-in-chief wrote an editorial that the newspaper was publishing the cartoons because Muslims had to get over their "sickly oversensitivity". Another editor looked upon it as a cultural initiation: "By making fun of people we're also including them in our society. It's not always easy for those concerned, but that the price they're got to pay". Editors expressed concern that Danish comedians, artists and so on were self-censoring because they were afraid of a violent response from Muslims.

The global protests that erupted in February 2006 shocked the artists who submitted cartoons. After receiving a bomb threat one cartoonist was angry that Muslims fleeing persecution in their own countries would "want the laws they have fled" to be enforced in Denmark. The editors stood their ground: "Everyone had to accept being subject to satire."

Al Qaeda claimed responsibility for a car bombing at the Danish embassy in Islamabad, Pakistan in June 2008 which they said was revenge for the "insulting drawings".

After the Charlie Hebdo attack in 2015 Je Suis Charlie became a rallying cry for secular, free speech advocates. Emmanuel Todd was very skeptical and critical of the "right to blasphemy" narrative. Skeptics thought it amounted to little more than ridicule of a marginalized group. Scholars rebutting Todd's study have found that many of the protestors were liberal, tolerant people who did not have Islamophobic or xenophobic views. For many of the Je Suis Charlie protestors the sentiment of the protest was simply: it is not ok to kill someone because they have offended you.

=== Judaism ===
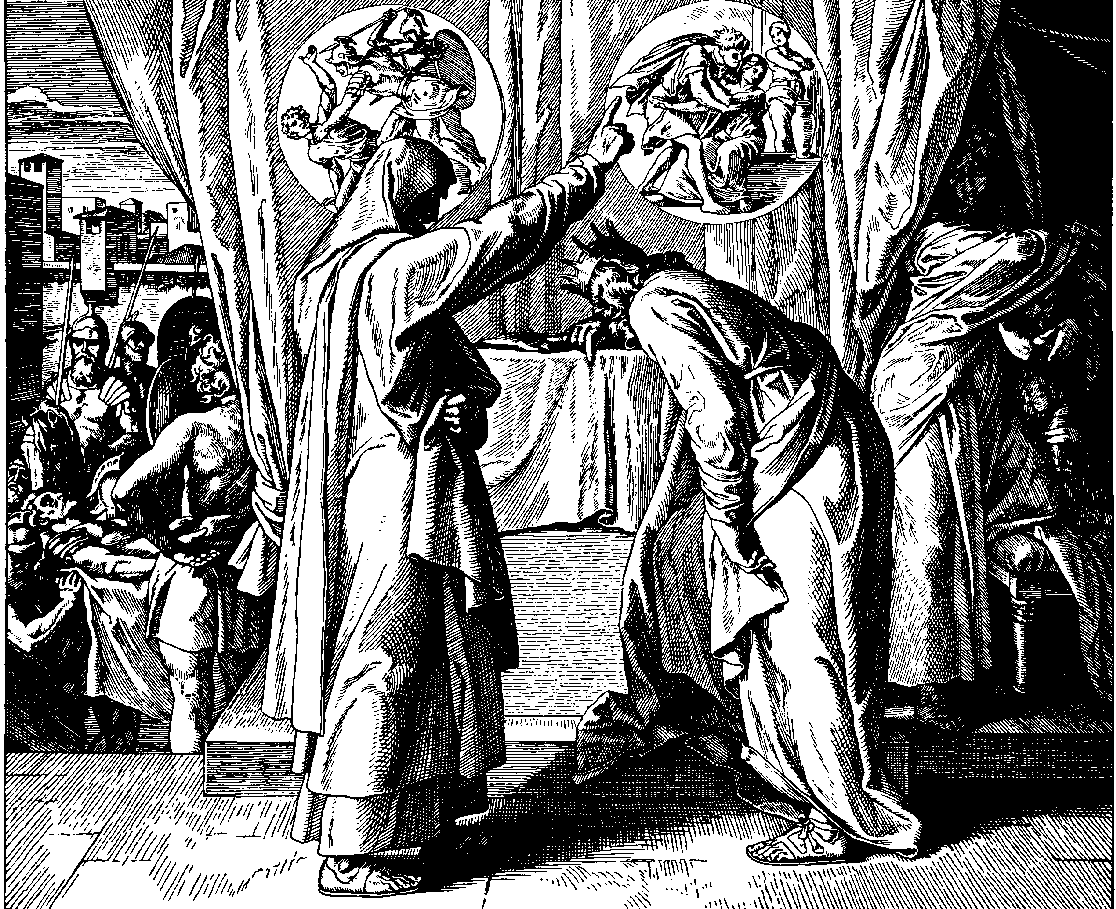
Nathan confronts David over his sex scandal with Bathsheba the wife of Uriah the Hittite, saying "by this deed you have given occasion to the enemies of the LORD to blaspheme" (2 Samuel 12:14).

In Leviticus 24:16, the punishment for blasphemy is death. In Jewish law, the only form of blasphemy which is punishable by death is blaspheming the name of the Lord. Leviticus 24:16 states that, "anyone who blasphemes the name of Yahweh will be put to death."

The Seven Laws of Noah, which Judaism sees as applicable to all people, prohibits blasphemy.

In one of the texts of the Dead Sea Scrolls, called the Damascus Document, violence against non-Jews (also called Gentiles) is prohibited except in cases where it is sanctioned by a Jewish governing authority, "so that they will not blaspheme".

=== Buddhism ===
Buddhism has no concept of blasphemy. In contrast, in West Asia, the birthplace of Abrahamic religions (namely Islam, Judaism, and Christianity), there was no room for such tolerance and respect for dissent where heretics and blasphemers had to pay with their lives.

Insulting Buddhism is a punishable offence in some Buddhist majority counties like Sri Lanka and Myanmar. In 2015 a man from New Zealand was sentenced to prison for depicting a picture of Buddha with headphones. Similarly in 2020, Shakthika Sathkumara, a Sri Lankan author, was sentenced 10 years in prison for insulting Buddhism.

=== Sikhism ===
Blasphemy is taken harshly by Sikhs. It is called "beadbi" by Sikhs. In October, 2021, a Nihang Singh killed a man for beadbi of the Sarbloh Granth. In December, 2021, a man was beaten to death at the Golden Temple for committing blasphemy. Such punishments are justified with orthodox Sikhs saying, "instant justice" is deserving for beadbi which is the "ultimate act of crime".

== Backlash against anti-blasphemy laws ==
=== Affirmation of freedom of speech ===
Multilateral global institutes, such as the Council of Europe and the UN, have rejected the imposition of "anti-blasphemy laws" and have affirmed freedom of speech.

==== Council of Europe ====
The Parliamentary Assembly of the Council of Europe, after deliberating on the issue of blasphemy law passed the resolution that blasphemy should not be a criminal offence, which was adopted on 29 June 2007 in the Recommendation 1805 (2007) on blasphemy, religious insults and hate speech against persons on grounds of their religion. This Recommendation set a number of guidelines for member states of the Council of Europe in view of Articles 10 (freedom of expression) and 9 (freedom of thought, conscience and religion) of the European Convention on Human Rights.

==== United Nations ====
After the Organisation of Islamic Cooperation's campaign seeking to impose punishment for "defamation of religions" was withdrawn due to consistently-dwindling support for their campaign, the UN Human Rights Committee (UNHRC), in July 2011, released a 52-paragraph statement that affirmed freedom of speech and rejected laws banning "display of lack of respect for a religion or other belief system'. The UNHRC's General Comment 34 - Paragraph 48 on the International Covenant on Civil and Political Rights (ICCPR) 1976, concerning freedoms of opinion and expression states:

Prohibitions of displays of lack of respect for a religion or other belief system, including blasphemy laws, are incompatible with the Covenant, except in the specific circumstances envisaged in article 20, paragraph 2, of the Covenant. Such prohibitions must also comply with the strict requirements of article 19, paragraph 3, as well as such articles as 2, 5, 17, 18 and 26. Thus, for instance, it would be impermissible for any such laws to discriminate in favor of or against one or certain religions or belief systems, or their adherents over another, or religious believers over non-believers. Nor would it be permissible for such prohibitions to be used to prevent or punish criticism of religious leaders or commentary on religious doctrine and tenets of faith.

=== International Blasphemy Day ===
International Blasphemy Day, observed annually on September 30, encourages individuals and groups to openly express criticism of religion and blasphemy laws. It was founded in 2009 by the Center for Inquiry. A student contacted the Center for Inquiry in Amherst, New York to present the idea, which CFI then supported. Ronald Lindsay, president and CEO of the Center for Inquiry, said, regarding Blasphemy Day, "[W]e think religious beliefs should be subject to examination and criticism just as political beliefs are, but we have a taboo on religion", in an interview with CNN.

Events worldwide on the first annual Blasphemy Day in 2009 included an art exhibit in Washington, D.C., and a free speech festival in Los Angeles.

=== Repeals ===
Other countries have removed bans on blasphemy. France did so in 1881 (this did not extend to Alsace-Moselle region, then part of Germany, after it joined France) to allow freedom of religion and freedom of the press. Blasphemy was abolished or repealed in Sweden in 1970, England and Wales in 2008, Norway with Acts in 2009 and 2015, the Netherlands in 2014, Iceland in 2015, France for its Alsace-Moselle region in 2016, Malta in 2016, Denmark in 2017, Canada in 2018, New Zealand in 2019, and Ireland in 2020. Countries in Northern Europe, like Sweden, removed blasphemy laws in the 20th century. As a result, problems arose in Scandinavia and governments reinstated certain laws and regulations. Certain instances of book burning occurred as well. Many instances of hate speech are being tried under blasphemy laws, especially in books and religious ideas. Denmark has also fully reinstated blasphemy laws on various book publications.

== Nations with blasphemy laws ==
Blasphemy laws and penalties by jurisdiction: Death sentences Prison sentences Fines, other restrictions, or unknown penalty Blasphemy is a common law offence Blasphemy laws repealed No blasphemy laws

In some countries, incl. those with a state religion, such as Algeria, Egypt, Indonesia, Iran, Iraq, Kuwait, Malaysia, Morocco, Nigeria, Oman, Pakistan, Qatar, Russia, Saudi Arabia, Turkey and the United Arab Emirates, blasphemy is illegal under the criminal code.

=== Purpose of blasphemy laws ===
In some states, blasphemy laws are used to impose the religious beliefs of a majority, while in other countries, they are justified as putatively offering protection of the religious beliefs of minorities. With blasphemy banned and treated as a crime, it can be either some laws which directly punish religious blasphemy, or some laws that allow those who are offended by blasphemy to punish blasphemers. Those laws may condone penalties or retaliation for blasphemy under the labels of blasphemous libel, expression of opposition, or "vilification," of religion or of some religious practices, religious insult, or hate speech.

=== Nations with blasphemy laws ===
As of 2012, 33 countries had some form of anti-blasphemy laws in their legal code. Of these, 21 were Muslim-majority nations – Afghanistan, Algeria, Bahrain, Egypt, Indonesia, Iran, Jordan, Kuwait, Lebanon, Malaysia, the Maldives, Morocco, Oman, Pakistan, Qatar, Saudi Arabia, Somalia, Sudan, Turkey, the UAE and Western Sahara. Blasphemy is treated as a capital crime (death penalty) in some Muslim nations. In these nations, such laws have led to the persecution, lynchings, murder or arrest of minorities and dissident members, after flimsy accusations.

The other twelve nations with anti-blasphemy laws in 2012 included India and Singapore, as well as Christian majority states, including Denmark (abolished in 2017), Finland, Germany, Greece (abolished in 2019), Ireland (abolished in 2020), Italy, Malta (abolished in 2016), the Netherlands (abolished in 2014), Nigeria, Norway (abolished in 2015) and Poland. Spain's "offending religious feelings" law is also, effectively, a prohibition on blasphemy. In Denmark, the former blasphemy law which had support of 66% of its citizens in 2012, made it an offence to "mock legal religions and faiths in Denmark". Many Danes saw the "blasphemy law as helping integration because it promotes the acceptance of a multicultural and multi-faith society."

In the judgment E.S. v. Austria (2018), the European Court of Human Rights declined to strike down the blasphemy law in Austria on Article 10 (freedom of speech) grounds, saying that criminalisation of blasphemy could be supported within a state's margin of appreciation. This decision was widely criticised by human rights organisations and commentators both in Europe and North America.

In Afghanistan, Iran, Pakistan, Saudi Arabia and the northern portion of Nigeria, blasphemy is punishable by death. The act is punishable by up to one year of imprisonment in Brazil, up to two years of imprisonment in South Africa, up to three years of imprisonment in India, up to four years of imprisonment in Russia and up to five years of imprisonment in Indonesia.

== Hyperbolic use of the term blasphemy ==
In contemporary language, the notion of blasphemy is often used hyperbolically (in a deliberately exaggerated manner). This usage has garnered some interest among linguists recently, and the word blasphemy is a common case used for illustrative purposes.

== See also ==
- Blasphemy laws
- Defamation of religion and the United Nations
- Desecration
- Freedom of speech
- Hate crime
- International Blasphemy Day
- Quran desecration
- Religious offense
- Sacrilege
- Thou shalt not take the name of the Lord thy God in vain
