= Blasphemous libel =

Former common law criminal offence in England and Wales

Blasphemous libel was originally an offence under the common law of England. Today, it is an offence under the common law of Northern Ireland, but has been abolished in England and Wales, and repealed in Canada and New Zealand. It is a form of criminal libel that consists of the publication of material which exposes the Christian religion to scurrility, vilification, ridicule, and contempt, with material that must have the tendency to shock and outrage the feelings of Christians.

Historically, the common law offences of blasphemy and blasphemous libel were adopted from the common law of England as common law offences in British colonies and territories. From the late 19th century, several colonies and countries replaced the common law offences with adopted versions of the draft code called "the Stephen Code" written by Sir James Fitzjames Stephen as part of a Royal Commission in England in 1879. The Stephen Code included the offence of blasphemous libel but omitted blasphemy. The common law offences of blasphemy and blasphemous libel were abolished in England and Wales with the passage of the Criminal Justice and Immigration Act 2008 but the offences remain as part of the common law, criminal code, or criminal statute in various countries, states, territories, and legal jurisdictions.

== United Nations General Comment 34 ==
Blasphemy laws are incompatible with the International Covenant on Civil and Political Rights (ICCPR). In July, 2011, the UN Human Rights Committee released a 52-paragraph statement, General Comment 34 on the International Covenant on Civil and Political Rights 1976, concerning freedoms of opinion and expression. Paragraph 48 states:

Prohibitions of displays of lack of respect for a religion or other belief system, including blasphemy laws, are incompatible with the Covenant, except in the specific circumstances envisaged in article 20, paragraph 2, of the Covenant. Such prohibitions must also comply with the strict requirements of article 19, paragraph 3, as well as such articles as 2, 5, 17, 18 and 26. Thus, for instance, it would be impermissible for any such laws to discriminate in favor of or against one or certain religions or belief systems, or their adherents over another, or religious believers over non-believers. Nor would it be permissible for such prohibitions to be used to prevent or punish criticism of religious leaders or commentary on religious doctrine and tenets of faith.

== Defence ==
In both Canada and New Zealand and other jurisdictions that adopted versions of the Stephen Code under their respective legislation, it was not blasphemous libel to express in good faith and decent language any opinion on a religious subject.

== Australia ==
The offences of blasphemy and blasphemous libel in English common law were carried over to the Australian colonies and "received" into state law.

Blasphemy and blasphemous libel are not criminal offences under Australian federal law, and the common law offences were abolished by the Criminal Code Act 1995.

These offences were abolished completely in Queensland and Western Australia when those jurisdictions adopted Criminal Codes that abolished the common-law offences, in 1899 and 1913 respectively, and did not replace them with code offences.

The 1924 Criminal Code of Tasmania includes the offences of both blasphemy and blasphemous libel, and also abolished both common law offences, while in New South Wales, the Crimes Act recognises blasphemous libel and the common-law offences have not been abolished: in both states, the relevant laws have not been enforced for many years, and are generally regarded as obsolete.

The Australian Capital Territory abolished the common law offence of blasphemous libel, but not blasphemy, with the Law Reform (Abolitions & Repeals) Act 1996.

In South Australia, Victoria, and the Northern Territory, the situation is uncertain as the local Criminal Codes (or Crimes Act in Victoria) do not mention blasphemy or blasphemous libel, but did not specifically abolish the common law offences: in the event, these laws have not been enforced for many years, and are regarded as obsolete.

== Canada ==
=== Summary of offence and defence ===
Blasphemy and Blasphemous libel were common law offences before the Criminal Code Act of 1892 abolished the common law offence of Blasphemy but included the offence of Blasphemous libel. Before repeal in December 2018, blasphemous libel was an offence under section 296 of the Criminal Code of Canada.

296

(1) Every one who publishes a blasphemous libel is guilty of an indictable offence and liable to imprisonment for a term not exceeding two years

(2) It is a question of fact whether or not any matter that is published is a blasphemous libel.

(3) No person shall be convicted of an offence under this section for expressing in good faith and in decent language, or attempting to establish by argument used in good faith and conveyed in decent language, an opinion on a religious subject.

It was an indictable offence punishable with imprisonment for a term not exceeding two years. The offence of blasphemous libel, like all other laws of Canada, was subject to section 2 of the Canadian Charter of Rights and Freedoms, which protects freedom of expression. Before the law's repeal, no court was asked to consider whether blasphemous libel was consistent with the Charter's guarantee of freedom of expression, which came into force in 1982.

=== Last prosecution: R v Rahard (1935) ===
The last prosecution of a charge of blasphemous libel was in 1935, in R v Rahard, in Quebec. In that case, the court adopted an argument that prosecutor E. J. Murphy had proffered in the case of R v Sperry (unreported) in 1926. Mr. Murphy put the issue this way:

The question is, is the language used calculated and intended to insult the feelings of and the deepest religious convictions of the great majority of the persons amongst whom we live? If so, they are not to be tolerated any more than any other nuisance is tolerated. We must not do things that are outrages to the general feeling of propriety among the persons amongst whom we live.

In Rahard, the Court found the Rev. Victor Rahard of the Anglican Church of Canada guilty of blasphemous libel for his aspersions upon the Roman Catholic Church.

The words "calculated and intended to insult the feelings and the deepest religious convictions of the great majority of the persons amongst whom we live", which the court used, were adopted from the summing up of Lord Coleridge, LCJ. in R v Bradlaugh.

=== Repeal ===
On 6 June 2017, Bill C-51 was introduced into the 42nd Canadian Parliament by the Minister of Justice to repeal the blasphemous libel law, among other provisions that were found to be unconstitutional or obsolete. The bill passed the House of Commons on 11 December 2017. The Senate passed the bill with amendments on 30 October 2018. The House, however, notified the Senate on 10 December that it disagreed with the amendments, so on 11 December the Senate voted not to insist on them and the bill was passed. On 13 December, the governor general formally granted royal assent making the repeal official.

== Republic of Ireland ==
In the Republic of Ireland, §13 of the Defamation Act, 1961 prescribed penalties for blasphemous libel, but did not define the offence. The only attempted prosecution since the 1937 Constitution was in 1999; the Supreme Court ruled that the Constitution had extinguished the common law offence of blasphemous libel, since when "it is impossible to say of what the offence of blasphemy consists". The Defamation Act 2009 defines a new offence of "Publication or utterance of blasphemous matter", which was held to be required by Article 40.6.1.i. of the Constitution, which states "The publication or utterance of blasphemous, seditious or indecent matter is an offence which shall be punishable in accordance with law". The 37th amendment subsequently deleted "blasphemous" from the constitution.

== New Zealand ==
It was an offence in New Zealand under section 123 of the Crimes Act 1961 to publish any blasphemous libel. The maximum punishment was one-year imprisonment. No one could be prosecuted without the consent of the Attorney General.

Section 123(3) of the Crimes Act 1961 provided:

It is not an offence against this section to express in good faith and in decent language, or to attempt to establish by arguments used in good faith and conveyed in decent language, any opinion whatever on any religious subject.

=== Repeal ===
On 19 March 2018, Justice Minister Andrew Little introduced a Crimes Amendment Bill which included repeal of section 123. The bill passed the first reading on 28 March and was referred to the Justice select committee which reported back on 28 September with the recommendation that the repeal of Section 123 proceed without change. The bill passed second reading on 11 December 2018, the Committee of the Whole House on 20 February 2019, and the third reading on 5 March 2019. The royal assent was received on 11 March and the Act came into force on 12 March 2019 repealing Section 123 of the Crimes Act 1961 on that date.

== United Kingdom ==
=== England and Wales ===
In 1985, the Law Commission (England and Wales) published a report, Criminal Law: Offences against Religious and Public Worship, that concluded that the common law offences of blasphemy and blasphemous libel should be abolished without replacement. In England and Wales, the common law offence of blasphemous libel was abolished on 8 July 2008 by the Criminal Justice and Immigration Act 2008. The Racial and Religious Hatred Act 2006 created an offence of inciting hatred against a person on the grounds of their religion.

=== Northern Ireland ===
Blasphemous libel is an offence under the common law of Northern Ireland. Section 7 of the Libel Act 1843 creates a defence.

See also the Criminal Libel Act 1819, the Libel Act 1792 (32 Geo. 3. c. 60) and section 8 of the Law of Libel Amendment Act 1888.

== See also ==
- Blasphemy
- Blasphemy law
- Defamation
