= John William Gott =

Socialist; last person imprisoned for blasphemy in Britain (1866-1922)

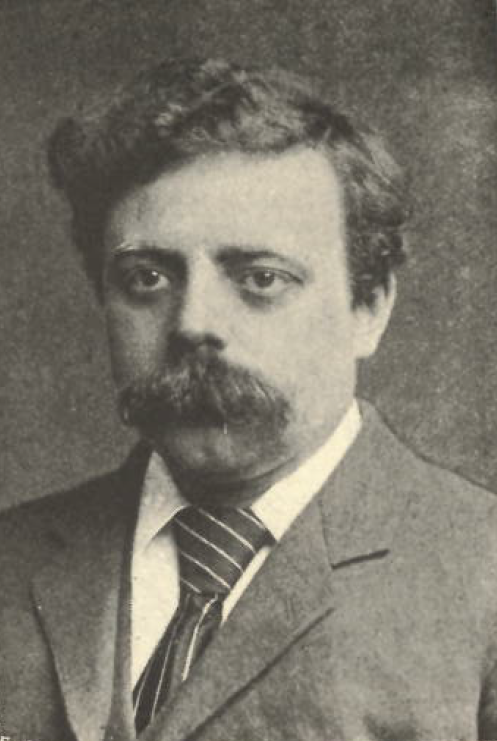
Gott, in about 1900

John William Gott (1866 – 4 November 1922) was a British socialist and the last person in Britain to be sent to prison for blasphemy. His was also the last public prosecution for blasphemy. Later prosecutions were purely private.

== Religious statements ==
A trouser salesman from Bradford, he led the Freethought Socialist League, working with Thomas Stewart and Ernest Pack. Gott believed that Christian influence was undermining attempts to achieve socialism. Gott and his supporters promoted virulent and public attacks on Christianity. He boasted that his organisation was "responsible for more outdoor lectures on Secularism and Rationalism than all other Societies combined." This was not always easy, as Gott frequently had to solicit funds to continue the lectures.

== Initial imprisonment ==
Gott came to the attention of the Home Office in 1902 with the Truth Seeker when local Manchester residents started to agitate against its circulation. The Home Office advised the Chief Constable of Bradford not to prosecute; the Leeds police however decided to prosecute the publishers of the Truth Seeker in 1903. This prosecution was thrown out by the magistrate but Gott was again charged in Leeds for "Rib Ticklers or Questions for Parsons" in 1911.

In 1911, Gott was sentenced to four months in jail for blasphemy because of publishing attacks on Christianity. His imprisonment produced a number of petitions in his support and an attempt in parliament to repeal the law on blasphemy. Gott was supported by a number of M.P.s as well as the Conway Hall Ethical Society and many of its members and supporters like Frederick James Gould, William Thomas Stead, Chapman Cohen and George William Foote. The proposed new legislation to replace the blasphemy law was supported by the Prime Minister H. H. Asquith, but it failed to pass through parliament.

== Further imprisonments ==
After the death of his wife Gott stepped up his campaigning. Further periods of imprisonment followed: two weeks at Birkenhead in 1916; and six weeks in Birmingham in 1917. In 1918 he was sentenced for exhibiting a poster contrary to the Defence of the Realm Act.

His final arrest was in 1921, initially for obstruction after selling birth control tracts and other material. The charge was increased to blasphemy. At his last trial at the Old Bailey in London in 1921, he was found guilty, and sentenced to nine months' imprisonment with hard labour. An appeal was lodged, supported by the National Secular Society; the Lord Chief Justice upheld the conviction. Giving the judgement at the Court of Appeal, Lord Trevethin C.J. said:

It does not require a person of strong religious feelings to be outraged by a description of Jesus Christ entering Jerusalem "like a circus clown on the back of two donkeys". There are other passages in the pamphlets equally offensive to anyone in sympathy with the Christian religion, whether he be a strong Christian, or a lukewarm Christian, or merely a person sympathizing with their ideals. Such a person might be provoked to a breach of the peace.

By the time Gott was released, his weak health had been broken by the conditions of his imprisonment. He died on 4 November 1922, at the age of 56. Historian Edward Royle describes him as a "witty and attractive character" who became more "embittered" after the death of his wife. He was buried at Scholemoor Cemetery, Bradford.
