= Racial and Religious Hatred Act 2006 =

Act of Parliament of the United Kingdom

- Act of Parliament
- Parliament of the United Kingdom
- Long title: An Act to make provision about offences involving stirring up hatred against persons on racial or religious grounds.
- Citation: 2006 c. 1
- Territorial extent: England and Wales

Dates
- Royal assent: 16 February 2006
- Commencement: 1 October 2007 (partially)
Other legislation
Amended by	None
Relates to	Police and Criminal Evidence Act 1984; Public Order Act 1986; Protection from Harassment Act 1997

Status: Current legislation

History of passage through Parliament

Text of statute as originally enacted

The Racial and Religious Hatred Act 2006 (c. 1) is an act of the Parliament of the United Kingdom which creates an offence in England and Wales of inciting hatred against a person on the grounds of their religion. The act was the Labour Government's third attempt to bring in this offence: provisions were originally included as part of the Anti-Terrorism, Crime and Security Bill in 2001, but were dropped after objections from the House of Lords. The measure was again brought forward as part of the Serious Organised Crime and Police Bill in 2004-5, but was again dropped in order to get the body of that Bill passed before the 2005 general election.

The act is notable because two amendments made in the House of Lords failed to be overturned by the Government in the House of Commons.

Most of the Act came into force on 1 October 2007.

== Previous attempts at legislation ==
After the terrorist attacks of 11 September 2001, the Government in Britain brought forward the Anti-Terrorism, Crime and Security Bill. Clause 38 of that Bill would have had the effect of amending Part 3 of the Public Order Act 1986 to extend the existing provisions on incitement to racial hatred to cover incitement to religious hatred. When the Bill reached the House of Lords, an amendment to remove the clause was passed by 240 votes to 141. The Commons reinstated the clause, but the Lords again removed it. Finally, the then Home Secretary, David Blunkett, accepted that the Commons had to accede to the Lords' insistence that the clause be left out of the Bill.

The government brought the proposal back before Parliament in the Serious Organised Crime and Police Bill in the Session leading up to the general election in May 2005. During the Lords debate on the relevant section of the Bill, on 5 April 2005 (the day on which the general election was called), the provision was removed. When the Bill returned to the Commons on 7 April, the Government announced that it was dropping the measure so as to secure the passage of the Bill as a whole before the Dissolution of Parliament.

At the general election, the Labour Party confirmed that, were it to be re-elected, it would bring in a Bill to outlaw incitement to religious hatred: "It remains our firm intention to give people of all faiths the same protection against incitement to hatred on the basis of their religion. We will legislate to outlaw it and will continue the dialogue we have started with faith groups from all backgrounds about how best to balance protection, tolerance and free speech".

== Controversy ==
The Act amends the Public Order Act 1986 as follows:

- Section 29A
  - Meaning of "religious hatred"
    - In this Part "religious hatred" means hatred against a group of persons defined by reference to religious belief or lack of religious belief.
- Section 29B:
  - (1) A person who uses threatening words or behaviour, or displays any written material which is threatening, is guilty of an offence if he intends thereby to stir up religious hatred.

The Government's plan was simply to add 'or religious' after 'racial' in the existing law, which would then have penalised use of 'threatening, abusive or insulting words or behaviour'. Critics of the Bill (before the removal of the words 'abusive or insulting ' and the addition of a requirement for the intention of stirring up religious hatred) asserted that the Act would make major religious works such as the Bible and the Quran illegal in their current form in the UK. Comedians and satirists also feared prosecution for their work. While sympathising with those who promoted the legislation, actor and comedian Rowan Atkinson said: "I appreciate that this measure is an attempt to provide comfort and protection to them but unfortunately it is a wholly inappropriate response far more likely to promote tension between communities than tolerance." Leaders of major religions and race groups spoke out against the Bill, as did non-religious groups such as the National Secular Society, English PEN and Humanists UK (who had since 2001 been pointing to the vital differences between ethnicity and religion when the context was restricting freedom of speech).

Supporters of the Bill responded that all UK legislation has to be interpreted in the light of the Human Rights Act 1998, which guarantees freedom of religion and expression, and so denied that an Act of Parliament is capable of making any religious text illegal.

The House of Lords passed amendments to the Bill on 25 October 2005 which have the effect of limiting the legislation to "A person who uses threatening words or behaviour, or displays any written material which is threatening... if he intends thereby to stir up religious hatred". This removed the abusive and insulting concept, and required the intention – not just the possibility – of stirring up religious hatred.

The Government attempted to overturn these changes, but lost the House of Commons votes on 31 January 2006.

The Shadow Attorney General Dominic Grieve had described the legislation as a "foolish manifesto commitment" which had been introduced to "appease" some minority groups, and that the policy "threatened free speech".

== History ==
- 11 July 2005 – The bill was passed by the House of Commons and was passed up to the House of Lords.
- 11 October 2005 – The bill was read by the House of Lords as a 300-strong group of protesters demonstrated in Hyde Park. Forty-seven Lords spoke in the debate, of whom nine came out in support of the bill.
- 25 October 2005 – The House of Lords passed amendments to the Bill.
- 31 January 2006 – The Commons agreed to an amendment from the House of Lords by 288 to 278, contrary to the position of the Government. A second Lords amendment was approved by 283 votes to 282 in the absence of Prime Minister Tony Blair, who had apparently underestimated support for the amendment. This made the bill the Labour government's second (and third) defeat since the 2005 election. The Tories' strategy to win the vote was inspired by "A Good Day", an episode of American television series The West Wing.
- 16 February 2006 – The Bill received Royal Assent to become the Racial and Religious Hatred Act 2006 c. 1.
- 1 October 2007 – The act came partially into force with the publication of a Statutory Instrument. Remaining provisions awaiting commencement are the insertion of sections 29B(3), 29H(2), 29I(2)(b) and 29I(4) into the Public Order Act 1986:

== See also ==
- Censorship in the United Kingdom
- Freedom of speech
- Incitement
- Public Order Act 1986

== Bibliography ==
- Doe, N; Sandberg, R (2008), "The Changing Criminal Law on Religion", Law & Justice, 161: 88–97
- Goodall, K (2007), "Incitement to Racial Hatred: All Talk and No Substance", Modern Law Review, 70 (1): 89, doi:10.1111/j.1468-2230.2006.00627.x, hdl:1893/262, S2CID 145396261
- Hare, I (2006), "Crosses, Crescents and Sacred Cows: Criminalising Incitement to Racial Hatred", Public Law: 521
