= Gay News =

British LGBT newspaper (1972-1983)

- Type: Fortnightly newspaper
- Format: Tabloid
- Owner: RP Marketing Ltd.
- Publisher: Robert Palmer
- Editor: Denis Lemon
- Associate editor: Keith Howes, Alison Hennegan
- News editor: Michael Mason
- Staff writers: Martin Corbett; Ian Dunn; Glenys Parry; Suki J. Pitcher; Doug Pollard
- Founded: June 1972
- Ceased publication: 15 April 1983
- Political alignment: Liberal
- Language: English
- Headquarters: London, England; United Kingdom
- Circulation: ca. 18,000
- Price: GB£0.30 UK; US$1.00 US

Gay News was a fortnightly newspaper in the United Kingdom founded in June 1972 in a collaboration between former members of the Gay Liberation Front and members of the Campaign for Homosexual Equality (CHE). At the newspaper's height, circulation was 18,000 to 19,000 copies.

== History of Gay News ==
The original editorial collective included Denis Lemon (editor), Martin Corbett (who later was an active member of ACT UP), David Seligman, a founder member of the London Gay Switchboard collective, Ian Dunn of the Scottish Minorities Group (and later co-founder of the Paedophile Information Exchange), Glenys Parry (national chair of CHE), Suki J. Pitcher, and Doug Pollard, who later went on to launch the weekly gay newspaper, Gay Week (affectionately known as Gweek) (he later became a presenter on Joy Melbourne 94.9FM, Australia's first full-time GLBTI radio station, and was for a time editor of Melbourne Star, the city's fortnightly gay newspaper). Amongst Gay News's early "Special Friends" were Graham Chapman of Monty Python's Flying Circus, his partner David Sherlock, and Antony Grey, secretary of the UK Homosexual Law Reform Society from 1962 to 1970.

Sex between men had been partially decriminalised for males over the age of 21 in England and Wales with the passage of the Sexual Offences Act 1967. After the Stonewall Riots in New York in 1969, the Gay Liberation Front spread from the United States to London in 1970. Gay News was the response to a nationwide demand by lesbians and gay men for news of the burgeoning liberation movement.

The paper played a pivotal role in the struggle for gay rights in the 1970s in the UK. It was described by Alison Hennegan (who joined the newspaper as Assistant Features Editor and Literary Editor in June 1977) as the movement's "debating chamber". Although essentially a newspaper, reporting alike on discrimination and political and social advances, it also campaigned for further law reform, including parity with the heterosexual age of consent of sixteen, against the hostility of the church which treated homosexuality as a sin, and the medical profession which treated homosexuality as a pathology. It campaigned for equal rights in employment (notably in the controversial area of the teaching profession) and the trades union movement at a time when left politics in the United Kingdom was still historically influenced by its Nonconformist roots in its hostility to homosexuality. But under the influence of its features editors, Howes and Hennegan, it also excavated the lesbian and cultural history of past decades as well as presenting new developments in the arts. Keith Howes later published the encyclopaedic reference, Broadcasting It, ostensibly dealing with homosexuality in film, radio and TV from 1923 to 1993 but amounting to a cultural review of British homosexuality in the 20th century.

Two of the paper's news staff, Michael Mason and Graham McKerrow, later founded the London weekly newspaper Capital Gay which was launched in June 1981.

Gay News challenged the authorities from the outset by publishing personal contact ads, in defiance of the law; in early editions this section was always headlined "Love knoweth no laws."

In the first year of publication, editor Denis Lemon was charged and fined for obstruction, for taking photographs of police behaviour outside the popular leather bar in Earls Court, the Coleherne pub.

In September 1973 Gay News, in conjunction with the Gay Liberation Front, recognised that they were receiving a large volume of information calls to their offices. Accordingly, they put out a call for a switchboard to be organised. Six months later, on 4 March 1974, the London Gay Switchboard (now Switchboard - LGBT+ Helpline) was formed. Gay News alongside Switchboard and the Health Education Council went on to hold the first open conference on HIV/AIDS in Britain on 21 May 1983. At this conference Mel Rosen, of Gay Men's Health Crisis, New York, declared "I hope you get very scared today because there is a locomotive coming down the tracks and it's leaving the United States."

In 1974, Gay News was charged with obscenity, having published an issue with a cover photograph of two men kissing. It won the court case.

The newspaper was featured in the 1975 film Tommy. In 1976 Mary Whitehouse brought a private prosecution of blasphemy (Whitehouse v Lemon) against both the newspaper and its editor, Denis Lemon, over the publication of James Kirkup's poem The Love that Dares to Speak its Name in the issue dated 3 June 1976. Lemon was found guilty when the case came to court in July 1977 and sentenced to a suspended nine-month prison sentence and personally fined £1,000. When all totalled up, fines and court costs awarded against Lemon and Gay News amounted to nearly £10,000. After a campaign and several appeals the suspended prison sentence was dropped, but the conviction remained in force. The case drew enormous media coverage at the time. In 2002 BBC Radio 4 broadcast a play about the trial.

Gay News Ltd ceased trading on 15 April 1983.

== Campaign against W.H. Smith ==
One of the biggest problems the newspaper faced was that, although it was not an obscene publication, sale outlets were hard to find. W.H. Smith then controlled about one-third of the newspaper and magazine distribution in the UK through a wholly owned subsidiary. They rejected the paper's initial request for distribution, citing the low potential for sales. In July 1975, after the paper's readership had grown, W.H. Smith agreed to distribute the paper in its London bookstalls. In January 1978, W.H. Smith dropped Gay News from distribution after a row with the paper over its coverage of the Paedophile Information Exchange. W.H. Smith's action prompted widespread backlash, causing protests outside of its branches and at the firm's Annual General Meeting. In 1982, W.H. Smith again agreed to distribute the paper, noting that its circulation figures of approximately 20,000 copies per issue made it financially attractive.

== Famous judgments ==
- Whitehouse -v- Lemon; Whitehouse -v- Gay News Ltd On Appeal From Regina -v- Lemon[1979] 2 WLR 281

== See also ==
- Hall-Carpenter archives
