= Champerty and maintenance =

Doctrines in common law jurisdictions that aim to preclude frivolous litigation

Champerty and maintenance are doctrines in common law jurisdictions that aim to preclude frivolous litigation:

- Maintenance is the intermeddling of a disinterested party to encourage a lawsuit. It is: "A taking in hand, a bearing up or upholding of quarrels or sides, to the disturbance of the common right."
- Champerty (from Old French champart) is the financial support, by a party not naturally concerned in the suit, of a plaintiff that allows them to prosecute a lawsuit on condition that, if it be brought to a successful issue, the plaintiff will repay them with a share of the proceed from the suit.

In Giles v Thompson Lord Justice Steyn declared: "In modern idiom maintenance is the support of litigation by a stranger without just cause. Champerty is an aggravated form of maintenance. The distinguishing feature of champerty is the support of litigation by a stranger in return for a share of the proceeds."

At common law, maintenance and champerty were both crimes and torts, as was barratry (the bringing of vexatious litigation). This is generally no longer so as, during the nineteenth century, the development of legal ethics tended to obviate the risks to the public, particularly after the scandal of the Swynfen will case (1856–1864). However, the principles are relevant to modern contingent fee agreements between a lawyer and a client and to the assignment by a plaintiff of his rights in a lawsuit to someone with no connection to the case. Champertous contracts, such as third-party litigation funding agreements, can still, depending on jurisdiction, be void for public policy or attract liability for costs.

== History ==
The restrictions arose to combat abuses in medieval England. Unscrupulous nobles and royal officials would lend their names to bolster the credibility of doubtful and fraudulent claims in return for a share of the property recovered. Speaking extrajudicially in the early seventeenth century, Lord Chief Justice Coke described the origins of maintenance in this way:

Maintenance, manutenentia, is derived from the verb manutenere, and signifieth in law a taking in hand, bearing up, or upholding of quarrels and sides, to the disturbance or hindrance of common right.

The comments were made in context of the court previously having been anxious to prevent a wide range of maintenance; the term "maintenance" had been used to apply not just to those who gave support in civil claims, but also to those who sought to maintain robbers, heretics and even "a new sect coming from beyond the sea, clad in white garments". Judicial independence was gradually established, however, and by the early 19th century Jeremy Bentham wrote:

A mischief, in those times it seems but too common, though a mischief not to be cured by such laws, was, that a man would buy a weak claim, in hopes that power might convert it into a strong one, and that the sword of a baron, stalking into court with a rabble of retainers at his heels, might strike terror into the eyes of a judge upon the bench. At present, what cares an English judge for the swords of a hundred barons? Neither fearing nor hoping, hating nor loving, the judge of our days is ready with equal phlegm to administer, upon all occasions, that system, whatever it be, of justice or injustice, which the law has put into his hands.

== By jurisdiction ==
=== Australia ===
In Australia, champerty and maintenance as common law causes of action (as either a crime or a tort) have mostly been abolished by statute. In New South Wales, champerty and maintenance were abolished by the Maintenance, Champerty and Barratry Abolition Act 1993. In Victoria, champerty and maintenance was abolished as a tort by section 32 of the Wrongs Act 1958, and as a crime by section 332A of the Crimes Act 1958. In South Australia, champerty and maintenance was abolished as a crime and a tort under Schedule 11 of the Criminal Law Consolidation Act 1935 - importantly though, it is an open issue whether it is misconduct for a legal practitioner who is a party to or concerned in a champertous contract or arrangement.

=== Canada ===
In Canada, the common law crimes of champerty and maintenance were abolished, alongside all remaining common law offences except contempt of court, by the 1953 consolidation of the Criminal Code. However, champerty and maintenance remain torts in some Canadian jurisdictions.

In Ontario, champertous agreements are invalid under the Champerty Act, RSO 1897, c. 327.

=== England and Wales ===
Maintenance and champerty have not been crimes or torts since the passing of the Criminal Law Act 1967. However, the 1967 act stated:

The abolition of criminal and civil liability under the law of England and Wales for maintenance and champerty shall not affect any rule of that law as to the cases in which a contract is to be treated as contrary to public policy or otherwise illegal.

— section 14(2)

There are circumstances in which a non-party who funds litigation can be liable for costs, if the action fails.

For instance, in Re Oasis Merchandising Services Ltd the Court of Appeal reincarnated the tort against the assignment of a wrongful trading claim by a liquidator to a specialist litigation company to pursuing directors for wrongful trading. This has come under criticism given that claims against directors are enforced sub-optimally as company liquidators, typically accountants, are cautious to take on risks rather than save as much of the company as possible.

=== Hong Kong ===
In Hong Kong, champerty and maintenance were long thought to be obsolete both as a crime and a tort, but these two principles have been revived in recent years in response to the prevalence of recovery agents which present problems quite different from the mischief which historically these rules intended to combat.

The recovery agents typically perform "ambulance chasing" on accident victims, offering to arrange lawyers to handle their claims on a "no win no fee" basis. If the claim succeeds the recovery agents share a portion of the damages. This is seen as deception on uneducated victims who are ignorant to the availability of legal aid. The division of the damages in effect deprives the victims of the just compensation that they are entitled to for their bodily injury. The intermeddling of recovery agents in the lawsuit also presents ethical problems to lawyers, who may have undermined impartiality in advising on settlement. In response, the Department of Justice and the Law Society of Hong Kong carried out a massive publicity campaign aiming at educating the public to refuse recovery agents, citing that maintenance and champerty are criminal offences under the laws of Hong Kong.

In 2008, 21 people were arrested for champerty, maintenance and conspiracy. They were recovery agents "helping" accident victims on a "no win no fee" basis. One of the people arrested was a lawyer. Champerty and maintenance carries a sentence of up to seven years in Hong Kong.

On 25 June 2009, Winnie Lo Wai Yan, a solicitor, was convicted for conspiracy to maintain and a recovery agent was convicted for conspiracy to champer. She was found to have agreed to share 25% from the damages paid to the next friend of an 18-year-old traffic accident victim who suffered from permanent total loss of earning capacity. On 10 July 2009, Lo was sentenced to 15 months' imprisonment and the recovery agent was sentenced to 16 months' imprisonment (Case number: DCCC 610/2008). Lo appealed in the same year and on 3 December 2010, her appeal was dismissed by the Court of Appeal (Case number: CACC 254/2009).

On 30 January 2012, Lo's conviction was quashed in the Court of Final Appeal (Case number: FACC 2/2011). The Reasons for Judgment, published on 23 February 2012, stated that there is a serious problem with the finding made and endorsed by the trial judge and the Court of Appeal respectively that Lo knew that there had been champerty involved. Although the judge found maintenance and champerty are constitutional, he questioned whether criminal liability for maintenance should be retained in Hong Kong as liability for both maintenance and champerty were abolished in places such as England and South Australia.

On 26 March 2013, Louie Mui Kwok-keung, a barrister, was sentenced in the District Court to 3.5 years of imprisonment. He pleaded not guilty on 18 February 2013, to five counts of champerty and maintenance, allegedly committed between 1999 and 2008. He was the first barrister in the city to be convicted of such crimes (Case number: DCCC 890/2012).

=== Ireland ===
The Maintenance and Embracery Act 1634 passed by the Parliament of Ireland provides that "all statutes heretofore made in England concerning maintenance, champerty and embracery, or any of them now standing and being in their full strength and force, shall be put in due execution in this realme of Ireland". Poynings' Law had already imported all English statutes up to 1495; the 1634 act additionally imported the Maintenance and Embracery Act 1540. The 1634 and 1540 acts are still in force in the Republic of Ireland. In 2015 Persona Digital Telephony Ltd and Sigma Wireless Networks Ltd, which lost to Esat Digifone in a 1997 telecoms bidding process criticised by the Moriarty Tribunal, applied to launch a lawsuit against those involved in the 1997 bidding, to be funded by a UK company, Harbour Litigation Funding, in return for part of any damages awarded. In 2016, the High Court ruled that such third-party funding constituted champerty prohibited by the 1634 act; Persona said it would have to drop the case, being unable to afford the €10m expenses.

=== New Zealand ===
Maintenance and champerty are torts, not crimes, under New Zealand law. Despite calls for their abolition, the New Zealand Law Commission recommended their preservation in a 2001 report titled Subsidising Litigation.

=== United States ===
This concept exists in American jurisprudence but is disdained by "fans of entrepreneurial lawyering in the academy and elsewhere". There has been recent common usage of the term in the media in Nevada and Ohio. In NAACP v. Button, laws that overburden free speech rights in the name of preventing champerty were found to be unconstitutional. Courts in Florida have found that the causes of action for maintenance and champerty are no longer viable in Florida, but have been superseded by laws related to abuse of process, malicious prosecution, and wrongful initiation of litigation. Florida courts have held that champerty and maintenance may continue to exist as affirmative defenses, but only as to the enforceability of the champertous contract itself.

== See also ==
- Litigation funding
- Subpoena ad testificandum
