= Common Informers Act 1951 =

Act of the Parliament of the United Kingdom

Common Informers Act 1951 (Note: Section 3(1).)
- Act of Parliament
- Parliament of the United Kingdom
- Long title: An Act to abolish the common informer procedure.
- Citation: 14 & 15 Geo. 6. c. 39
- Introduced by: Sir Lionel Heald, Private Member's Bill (Commons)
- Territorial extent: United Kingdom

Dates
- Royal assent: 22 June 1951
- Commencement: 1 September 1951 (Note: Section 3(3).)
Other legislation
Amends	Sale of Wares after Close of Fair Act 1331; Tithe Act 1540; Commissioners Clauses Act 1847; Bank of England Act 1694
Amended by	Charities Act 1960; Ecclesiastical Jurisdiction Measure 1963; Statute Law Revision Act 1964; Criminal Law Act 1967; Theft Act 1968; Statute Law (Repeals) Act 1969; Courts Act 1971; Statute Law (Repeals) Act 1971; Hallmarking Act 1973; Statute Law (Repeals) Act 1976; Statute Law (Repeals) Act 1977; Statute Law (Repeals) Act 1978; Inshore Fishing (Scotland) Act 1984; Wages Act 1986; Statute Law (Repeals) Act 1993; Licensing Act 2003; Statute Law (Repeals) Act 2013; Statute Law (Repeals) Measure 2018
Relates to	Common Informers Act 1623; Sunday Observance Act 1780; Common Informers Act (Northern Ireland) 1954

Status: Partially repealed

Text of statute as originally enacted

Revised text of statute as amended

Text of the Common Informers Act 1951 as in force today (including any amendments) within the United Kingdom, from legislation.gov.uk.

The Common Informers Act 1951 (14 & 15 Geo. 6. c. 39) is an act of the Parliament of the United Kingdom that abolishes the principle of, and procedures concerning a common informer.

== Background ==
A common informer was a person who provided evidence in criminal trials, or who prosecuted for breaches of Irish penal laws, solely for the purpose of being rewarded with the penalty recovered, or a share of it. In medieval England, there was no police force and the state bureaucracy was insufficiently well developed to be able to ensure obedience to new laws. The practice of allowing the public to sue for penalties was successful and soon became widespread.

An action by a common informer was termed a "popular" or qui tam action. A legal action by an informer had to be brought within a year of the offence, unless a specific time was prescribed by the statute. The informer had to prove his case strictly and was given no assistance by the court, being denied discovery.

Following the Revolution of 1688 in England, the Popery Act 1698 (11 Will. 3. c. 4) introduced a reward of £100 for the apprehension of any Roman Catholic priest. The result was that Catholics were placed at the mercy of common informers who harassed them for the sake of gain, even when the government would have left them in peace.

Jonathan Swift described common informers as "a detestable race of people", while Edward Coke called them "viperous vermin".

In 1931, Millie Orpen, a solicitor's clerk, brought an action as a common informer against a cinema chain for opening on a succession of Sundays, contrary to the Sunday Observance Act 1780, s.1. Orpen claimed £25,000 against the cinema company and individual members of its board of directors. The claim was based on a forfeit of £200 per performance per defendant. The judge, Mr Justice Rowlatt, expressed some distaste for the proceedings. He found against the cinema chain, awarding Orpen £5,000, with costs, but found for the individual directors on the grounds there was no evidence they were guilty on any particular Sunday. Costs were awarded to the directors against Orpen. The judge granted a stay pending an appeal by the company. Later in the year Orpen brought a claim against another chain, but was thwarted by a change in the law legalising Sunday opening for cinemas before her case could be decided.

== The act ==
Many statutes, such as the Simony Act 1588 (31 Eliz. 1. c. 6) and the White Herring Fisheries Act 1771 (11 Geo. 3. c. 31), provide for penalties for offenders in breach of the provisions. Before this act, there were further statutory provisions for the levied penalties to be paid over to an informer. For example, section 15 of the Commissioners Clauses Act 1847 (10 & 11 Vict. c. 16) as of 2025 still in force, states:

Every person who shall act as a commissioner, being incapacitated or not duly qualified to act, or before he has made or subscribed such declaration as aforesaid, or after having become disqualified, shall for every such offence be liable to a penalty of fifty pounds; and such penalty may be recovered by any person, with full costs of suit, in any of the superior courts; and in every such action the person sued shall prove that at the time of so acting he was qualified, and had made and subscribed the declaration aforesaid, or he shall pay the said penalty and costs without any other evidence being required from the plaintiff than that such person had acted as a commissioner in the execution of this or the special act; nevertheless all acts as a commissioner of any person incapacitated, or not duly qualified, or not having made or subscribed the declaration aforesaid, done previously to the recovery of the penalty, shall be as valid as if such person had been duly qualified.

The act removed the right to recover a penalty from 48 acts, including:

Statute	Citation	Status
Sale of Wares after Close of Fair Act 1331	5 Edw. 3. c. 5	Repealed
Quality and Marks of Silver Work Act 1423	2 Hen. 6. c. 17	Repealed by Statute Law Revision Act 1953
Ecclesiastical Jurisdiction Act 1531	23 Hen. 8. c. 9	Repealed
Apprentices Act 1536	28 Hen. 8. c. 5	Repealed
Maintenance and Embracery Act 1540	32 Hen. 8. c. 9	Repealed
Leases by Corporations Act 1541	33 Hen. 8. c. 27	Repealed
Simony Act 1588	31 Eliz. 1. c. 6	In force
Sale of Horses Act 1555	31 Eliz. 1. c. 12	Repealed
Court Leet Act 1603	1 Jas. 1. c. 5.	Repealed by Statute Law Revision Act 1958
Act of Uniformity 1662	14 Cha. 2. c. 4	Repealed
Bank of England Act 1694	5 & 6 Will. & Mar. c. 20.	In force
Standard of Silver Plate, etc. Act 1696	8 & 9 Will. 3. c. 8.	Repealed
Plate Assay Act 1700	12 & 13 Will. 3. c. 4.	Repealed
Plate (Offences) Act 1738	12 Geo. 2. c. 26	Repealed
Gold and Silver Thread Act 1741	15 Geo. 2. c. 20	Repealed 1 January 1975
Universities (Wine Licences) Act 1743	17 Geo. 2. c. 40.	Repealed by Licensing Act 2003
Linen (Trade Marks) Act 1744	18 Geo. 2. c. 24	Repealed by Statute Law Revision Act 1959
Disorderly Houses Act 1751	25 Geo. 2. c. 36	Repealed
Fisheries (Scotland) Act 1756	29 Geo. 2. c. 23	Repealed by Inshore Fishing (Scotland) Act 1984
Bank Notes (Scotland) Act 1765	5 Geo. 3. c. 49	Repealed by Statute Law (Repeals) Act 1993
White Herring Fisheries Act 1771	11 Geo. 3. c. 31	Repealed by Marine and Coastal Access Act 2009
Plate Assay (Sheffield and Birmingham) Act 1772	13 Geo. 3. c. 52	Repealed
Sunday Observance Act 1780	21 Geo. 3. c. 49	Repealed
Fires Prevention Act 1785	25 Geo. 3. c. 77	Repealed by Criminal Law Act 1967
Gold and Silver Thread Act 1788	28 Geo. 3. c. 7	Repealed by Hallmarking Act 1973
Land Tax Commissioners Act 1798	38 Geo. 3. c. 48	Repealed by Finance Act 1963
Gold Plate (Standard) Act 1798	38 Geo. 3. c. 69	Repealed by Hallmarking Act 1973
Partridges Act 1799	39 Geo. 3. c. 34	Repealed
Sale of Offices Act 1809	49 Geo. 3. c. 126	Repealed by Statute Law (Repeals) Act 2013
Places of Religious Worship Act 1812	52 Geo. 3. c. 155	Repealed
Ecclesiastical Courts Act 1813	53 Geo. 3. c. 127	Repealed
Apothecaries Act 1815	55 Geo. 3. c. 194	Repealed by Statute Law (Repeals) Act 1989
North American Fisheries Act 1819	59 Geo. 3. c. 38	Repealed
Levy of Fines Act 1822	3 Geo. 4. c. 46	Repealed by Criminal Law Act 1967
Juries Act 1825	6 Geo. 4. c. 50	Partially repealed
Lighting and Watching Act 1833	3 & 4 Will. 4. c. 90	Repealed by Parish Councils Act 1957
Ecclesiastical Leases Act 1836	6 & 7 Will. 4. c. 20	Repealed by the Statute Law (Repeals) Measure 2018
Metropolitan Police Courts Act 1839	2 & 3 Vict. c. 71	Repealed
Public Notaries Act 1843	6 & 7 Vict. c. 90	Repealed by Statute Law (Repeals) Act 1993
Commissioners Clauses Act 1847	10 & 11 Vict. c. 16	In force
Summary Jurisdiction Act 1848	11 & 12 Vict. c. 43	Repealed
Larceny Act 1861	24 & 25 Vict. c. 96	Repealed by Theft Act 1968
Hosiery Manufacture (Wages) Act 1874	37 & 38 Vict. c. 48	Repealed
Seal Fishery Act 1875	38 & 39 Vict. c. 18	Repealed
Justices Clerks Act 1877	40 & 41 Vict. c. 43	Repealed
Municipal Corporations Act 1882	45 & 46 Vict. c. 50	Repealed
Representation of the People Act 1949	12, 13 & 14 Geo. 6. c. 68	Repealed

Most of these have themselves been repealed. The Crown was also prohibited from bringing actions as a common informer (s.1(5)). The former penalties were not all abolished but were commuted to £100, later revised to level 3 of the standard scale, though the purpose of this provision was obscure, for it was thought that not even the Crown could now bring such an action.

== Subsequent developments ==
Qui tam claims were codified in the United States under the False Claims Act, under which Abraham Lincoln sought to penalise manufacturers who sold his Army shoddy goods. It saw a revival in the U.S. from 1986 in actions by "whistleblowers". In May 2007 a consultative document from the Home Office Ministry of John Reid raised the question of whether members of the public who informed on companies or individuals defrauding the government should be entitled to a reward. It gained the attention of the House on 24 May 2007:

The Parliamentary Under-Secretary of State for the Home Department (Mr. Vernon Coaker): Seizing criminal assets delivers a wide range of benefits, from depriving criminals of capital to reducing the incentives for crime and the harm caused by crime, as well as promoting fairness and confidence in the criminal justice system. In 2006-07 the total amount recouped by all agencies involved in asset recovery in England, Wales and Northern Ireland was £125 million. This is a five-fold increase over five years. We want to build on this success. The Government are therefore publishing today an Asset Recovery Action Plan. The Action Plan has two purposes. Firstly it sets out robust proposals on how we are to reach our challenging target of recovering £250 million of the proceeds of crime by 2009-10. The Plan goes on to outline, for consultation, policy proposals for taking things further, including some radical ideas to move towards the Government's long term vision of detecting up to £1 billion of criminal assets.

The consultation period will end on 23 November 2007. A copy of the Action Plan is being placed in the Library of the House.

Submissions were obtained from the Fraud Advisory Panel, the Institute of Chartered Accountants, and the Local Authorities Coordinators of Regulatory Services, amongst others.

== Bibliography ==
- Beresford, M. W. (1957). "The Common Informer, the Penal Statutes and Economic Regulation". The Economic History Review. 10 (2). Blackwell Publishing: 221–238. doi:10.2307/2590859. JSTOR 2590859.
- Edwards, J. Ll. J. (1951). "Common Informers Act, 1951". Modern Law Review. 14 (4): 462–465. doi:10.1111/j.1468-2230.1951.tb00220.x.
- Home Office (2007). "Asset Recovery Action Plan: A Consultation Document" (PDF).
- Walker, P (24 May 2007). "Fraud whistleblowers could get cash rewards". The Guardian. London.
