= Blasphemy law in Australia =

Blasphemy and Blasphemous Libel are not criminal offences under Australian federal law, but the de jure situation varies at the federal, state and territory level. English Common law offences and statute law were "received" into law in Australian states and territories, and have not been abolished or repealed in some states and territories. Prosecutions for blasphemy or blasphemous libel remain possible, but have not recently been enforced in any Australian jurisdiction.

The English common law offences of blasphemy and blasphemous libel and the Blasphemy Act 1697 carried over to the Australian colonies and "received" into state law remained extant following Federation in 1901 unless specifically abolished or repealed. The common-law offences were abolished totally in Queensland in 1899 and in Western Australia in 1913, when those jurisdictions adopted criminal codes that superseded and abolished the common law offences. Tasmania abolished both common law offences in 1924 but replaced them with Criminal Code offences, which were subsequently repealed in 2024.

In South Australia, Victoria, and the Northern Territory, the situation is not clear, as the local criminal codes do not include blasphemy or blasphemous libel as offences, but also do not specifically abolish the common-law offences. In a subsection, the Victoria Crimes Act recognises the common law offence of blasphemous libel. The Australian Capital Territory abolished the common law offence of Blasphemous Libel in 1996, but failed to abolish the common law offence of blasphemy. In New South Wales, the criminal codes mention the offences of blasphemy and blasphemous libel, but leave the definition of blasphemy and the penalty to the common law.

== Origin of Australian blasphemy law ==
When the Australian colonies were established, they received English common law that included the common law offences of blasphemy and blasphemous libel with the potential for substantial penalties. The exact date that the common law was received varies by jurisdiction. The common law offences remain in force until abolished by legislation and may yet exist in some jurisdictions.

The Australian colonies also received the English Blasphemy Act 1697; long title "An Act for the more effectual suppressing of Blasphemy and Profaneness". This Act remains in force until repealed by legislation; it was repealed in Queensland in 1899, Western Australia in 1919, Tasmania in 1924, and the Commonwealth of Australia in 1995. It may still be in force in other states and territories.

== Religion to which the offences relate ==
In England where the common law offences originated, the question was considered settled in 1838 by Gathercole's Case. Baron Charles Alderson, speaking for the court, declared that "A person may, without being liable to prosecution for it, attack Judaism, or Mahomedanism, or even any sect of the Christian religion (save the established religion of the country); and the only reason why the latter is in a different situation from the others is, because it is the form established by law, and is therefore a part of the constitution of the country". As Australia and Australian states and territories have no established religion it is doubtful that the common law offences of blasphemy and blasphemous libel apply in Australia.

In Australia in 1992, the Australian Law Reform Commission stated that "The law of blasphemy is an ancient common law offence constituted by the publication of material which provokes outrage in Christians by insulting, ridiculing or vilifying God, Christ or the Christian religion as practised in the Church of England".

In 1994, the New South Wales Law Reform Commission added that "The common law offence of blasphemy applies only to scurrilous criticism of the fundamental tenets of the Church of England and other Christian denominations of coincident conviction. Such discrimination by the law in favour of a particular religion is itself an indicator of the need for review and possible reform."

In 1998, the Australian Human Rights and Equal Opportunity Commission in a report titled Article 18 – Freedom of religion and belief made use of the following definition: Blasphemy is an ancient English common law offence defined as a publication containing contemptuous, reviling, scurrilous or ludicrous matter relating to God, Jesus Christ, the Bible or the formularies of the Church of England which are calculated to provoke outrage in the feelings of any sympathiser or believer in Christianity. A person who publishes any blasphemous document is guilty of publishing a blasphemous libel.

== Blasphemy prosecutions in Australia ==
Prosecutions for blasphemy in Australia are rare and there have been few since 1919. As Australia has no established church, blasphemy offences that originated with English common law where they applied only to an established church may not be applicable to Australia, but there were some prosecutions and convictions.

== Abolition and repeal of blasphemy law in Australia ==
Common law offences remain part of the common law of a jurisdiction until "abolished" by legislation or superseded by specific legislation that takes precedence over the common law offence. In jurisdictions with specific legislation, the legislation must be "repealed" to remove the offence. Jurisdictions, known as "common law jurisdictions" use common law exclusively. Other jurisdictions, known as "code jurisdictions", use a Criminal Code or Crimes Act with all common law abolished. Yet other jurisdictions are "mixed jurisdictions" as they have a mixture of both with a Criminal Code or Crimes Act and common law offences that have not been abolished. In Australia, the Commonwealth, Queensland, Tasmania, and Western Australia are code jurisdictions with all common law offences abolished. In code and mixed jurisdictions the common law may still define the offence and set the penalties.

All common law offences were abolished and replaced by a criminal code without replacing the common law offences of blasphemy and blasphemous libel with criminal code offences in Queensland in 1899, Western Australia in 1919, and the Commonwealth in 1995. Tasmania abolished the common law offences in 1924 but introduced blasphemy code offences with the Tasmanian Criminal Code Act 1924. In 1996, the Australian Capital Territory abolished the common law offence of blasphemous libel but not blasphemy.

Although the common law offences of blasphemy and blasphemous libel were abolished in England and Wales in 2008, they have not been abolished in Australia in South Australia, Victoria, New South Wales and Norfolk Island, and the Northern Territory, and blasphemy but not blasphemous libel remains as an offence in the Australian Capital Territory.

It has been suggested that in states and territories where blasphemy laws remain, the laws have become "dead letter" laws and the common law concept of desuetude may apply, whereby an offence may lapse through prolonged disuse. However, British precedents indicate that desuetude has not applied since the Middle Ages and that common law offences must be abolished by legislation. After a long period of disuse, the English common law offences of blasphemy and blasphemous libel were declared to be dead letter laws by Lord Denning in 1949, but in 1977 in the case Whitehouse v Lemon, the House of Lords held that they were not dead letter laws. It requires further investigation or legal decisions to establish whether or not the common law offences of blasphemy and blasphemous libel are extant in Australian states and territories where they have not been abolished or replaced by legislation.

In 1994, the New South Wales Law Reform Commission recommended that all blasphemy offences be abolished without replacement. The Commission pointed out, in a report that is equally applicable to other states and territories, that every other law reform agency in Australia and in other common law countries that had considered the question had also recommended the abolition of blasphemy offences.

== Australian blasphemy law and the United Nations ==
Australia signed the International Covenant on Civil and Political Rights (ICCPR) on 18 December 1972. This covenant is binding on signatory countries. The UN Human Rights Committee adopted General Comment 34 in July 2011 that stated in paragraph 48 that "Prohibitions of displays of lack of respect for a religion or other belief system, including blasphemy laws, are incompatible with the Covenant … ".

Australia also signed the International Convention on the Elimination of All Forms of Racial Discrimination (ICERD) on 13 October 1966 and ratified it on 30 September 1975. This Convention includes an individual complaints mechanism, effectively making it enforceable against its parties, and is monitored by the Committee on the Elimination of Racial Discrimination (CERD). Parties to ICERD undertake to guarantee the right of everyone to equality before the law and equality in the enjoyment of the rights to freedom of thought, conscience and religion, freedom of opinion and expression.

Australian laws that prohibit blasphemy or blasphemous libel are discriminatory and contravene Australia's obligations under the ICCPR and ICERD and contravene international law.

== Religion and hate speech ==
In some jurisdictions, such as Tasmania, Queensland, and Victoria, someone who is offended by someone else's attitude toward religion or toward one religion can seek redress under legislation which prohibits hate speech.

== Position of the Anglican church ==
The English common law offences of blasphemy and blasphemous libel received into Australian law were intended to protect the tenets of the Anglican church but the Anglican church no longer supports the retention of these laws. At a meeting in the chapel of the United Kingdom Houses of Parliament in early 2015, Justin Welby, Archbishop of Canterbury said that Christians must stand up for religious freedom of atheists and Muslims as much as themselves and that he was opposed to all restrictions on freedom of speech concerning religion which did not constitute hate speech. He thanked the former MP Evan Harris, a humanist, for his efforts to abolish the blasphemy laws in the UK.

== Law Commission reports ==
=== England ===
Australian blasphemy law originated in England where the continued existence of the common law offences of blasphemy was controversial. In 1985, the English Law Commission published a report on Criminal Law: Offences against Religious and Public Worship, which recommended the abolition of blasphemy offences. The report noted that "there is no one agreed definition of blasphemy and blasphemous libel and that it would scarcely be practicable, even if it thought desirable, to amend the common law definition by statute". The authors added that "it is now clear that none of the arguments for retaining a law of blasphemy are sufficiently strong to support this view and each of them is outweighed by other considerations which persuade us that a law of blasphemy is not a necessary part of a criminal code. Moreover, we have no doubt that any replacement offence which might be devised would in practice prove to be unacceptably wide in ambit." The Commission concluded "that the common law offences of blasphemy and blasphemous libel should be abolished without replacement". These two offences were abolished in July 2008.

=== Australian Law Reform Commission ===
In 1992, the Australian Law Reform Commission produced Report 57 on Multiculturalism and the Law which "considers the role of the common law offence of blasphemy in federal law". The Commission noted that blasphemy is not a Commonwealth offence, but is picked up in Commonwealth legislation which refers to 'blasphemous' material (currently under review) and that as blasphemy is not specifically defined in any of this legislation it must be assumed that the English common law definition of blasphemy applies. The report noted that it is not within the power of the Commonwealth to abolish the offence of blasphemy except in some Territories, but is within power to remove references to 'blasphemous material' in federal law.

The Commission considered Australia's international obligations under covenants and conventions to which Australia is a party: The International Covenant on Civil and Political Rights (ICCPR) guarantees freedom of thought, conscience and religion, freedom of expression, the enjoyment of one's culture, the profession and practice of one's religion and the use of one's own language in community with other members of one's ethnic and religious community; and parties to the International Convention on the Elimination of All Forms of Racial Discrimination (CERD), undertake to guarantee the right of everyone to equality before the law and equality in the enjoyment of the rights to freedom of thought, conscience and religion, freedom of opinion and expression, and freedom of peaceful assembly and association.

The commission noted that blasphemy law provides only limited protection as religious affiliations in Australia are many and diverse. Although most Australians describe themselves as Christian, the largest single group of whom are Catholics, a growing minority (more than 300,000 in 1986) are members of non-Christian religious faiths, particularly Islam, Buddhism and Judaism, and that nearly two million Australians do not subscribe to any religion. The offence of blasphemy, however, protects only the Christian religion, with specific reference to the rituals and doctrines of the Anglican Church. Offences that involve the common law of blasphemy apply only to material that vilifies Christianity. This is not consistent with Australia's human rights obligations.

As part of their considerations, the commission released Discussion Paper 48 (DP 48) in 1991 that proposed that all references to 'blasphemous' material in federal law should be removed. In the submissions received there were strong views expressed both for and against the Commission's proposal. Submissions opposing the removal of all references to blasphemy from federal law were divided into two groups: those arguing that there should be no change to the existing law, and those arguing that all references to the offence should remain and be extended to include other religions. The commission reported that "it is argued that extending blasphemy law to cover all religions would raise serious difficulties in defining 'religions' and 'gods', would have grave consequences for freedom of speech and might contribute to religious conflict. On the other hand, removing all references to blasphemy in federal law would have the effect of removing an apparently preferential position of one religion and moving towards a situation of parity between religions in federal law. For this reason it should be done. In so far as blasphemy causes hurt to a person's sensibilities, the existing provisions on offensive behaviour and other public order offences are sufficient."

The report recommended that the criminal law be amended so that "all references to blasphemy in federal legislation should be removed".

=== New South Wales ===
In 1994, the New South Wales Law Reform Commission released a report on blasphemy after considering the law in New South Wales, other Australian states and territories, other jurisdictions in the region, the history of the law, international developments, freedom of speech, and public submissions. After considering possible options, the Commission recommended that all blasphemy law be abolished without replacement. The Commission pointed out that every other law reform agency in Australia and in other common law countries which had considered the question had likewise recommended the abolition of the offence of blasphemy. The report with its conclusions and recommendation is equally applicable to other Australian states and territories.

The review process began in 1990, the then New South Wales Attorney General, J R A Dowd, QC, MP, wrote to several major churches seeking views on the need for a review of the law of blasphemy. At the same time, the Australian Law Reform Commission was undertaking associated work in connection with its reference on Multiculturalism and the Law. The issues that arose in written submissions, preliminary meetings and telephone calls were incorporated by the Commission into Discussion Paper 24: Blasphemy, ("DP 24") which was published in February 1992. DP 24 considered various options for reform and offered tentative proposals to focus the debate, but did not make specific recommendations for reform. It sought to promote discussion of, and invite submissions on, the issues. Sixty-one written submissions were received from a range of individuals and organisations. The Commission considered the submissions and in 1994 released: Report 74 (1994) – Blasphemy.

In the report, the Law Reform Commission noted that while there is a real question as to whether blasphemy still exists in the criminal law of New South Wales, even if it was "received" as law in colonial times, given the long period of disuse, Section 49 of the Defamation Act 1974 (NSW) abolished the common law misdemeanour of criminal libel, but expressly left in operation "the law relating to blasphemous, seditious or obscene libel". Schedule 1 of that Act inserted section 574A into the Crimes Act, relating to the initiation of criminal proceedings for blasphemous libel giving recognition to the continued existence of the common law offence of blasphemous libel. Section 574A has since been repealed.

The commission noted that a traditional common law offence carries a large maximum penalty, and could easily result in considerable stigma in the event of conviction, but they doubted whether the offence of blasphemy has any existing deterrent effect, given that the offence is so obscure, prosecutions are so rare, and the penalty largely unknown. Adding that there has only been one successful prosecution for blasphemy in New South Wales ever, and that occurred over 120 years ago – they noted that the outcry resulting from the penalty imposed upon the convicted blasphemer caused far more civil unrest than the material which the prosecution was intended to suppress. They considered the possibility that wider knowledge of the offence might actually encourage some to publish that which the law sought to prevent as many authors and publishers have relished their "martyrdom" resulting from legal suppression.

The Commission found that: there are both legal and policy concerns with preserving the existing common law offence of blasphemy; public order is clearly capable of being preserved in New South Wales without the offence of blasphemy; it is inappropriate for the criminal law to be used to protect an individual's religious convictions in a secular society; the offence: curtails freedom of speech; it is unclear why religious beliefs merit special protection whereas other beliefs do not; that there is considerable uncertainty about the elements (and indeed the very existence) of the offence; the scope of the existing offence is limited to attacks on the Church of England and related Christian denominations; as a common law offence, blasphemy would have to be tried upon indictment in a superior court, with a judge and jury; and as a common law offence, sentencing is "at large" – that is, without any statutory limits or guidance.

In conclusion, the commission favoured the abolition of blasphemy law and considered that there is no need for a substituted or replacement offence. They recommended that the common law of blasphemy should be abolished.

== Blasphemy law by jurisdiction ==
=== Federal law ===
The federal law of Australia does not recognize blasphemy as an offence. In 1991, the Australian Law Reform Commission proposed the removal of all references to blasphemy in federal legislation. Until 2019, the final law against blasphemy is a prohibition against the registration of a ship which has a blasphemous name. This law existed on a more practical level and is to prevent strained relations between Australia and other more religious nations, and to protect the vessel and its occupants from harm whilst in foreign waters. Following the Ruddock Review into Religious Freedoms, which recommended that such references to blasphemy be repealed and replaced with terms not exclusive to religious, The Commonwealth amended the Shipping Regulations to remove this prohibition. The Australia Criminal Code Act 1995 does not create an offence of blasphemy or blasphemous libel while Chapter 1 section 1.1 of the Act abolishes the common law offences of blasphemy and blasphemous libel and the Blasphemy Act 1697.

=== New South Wales ===
Criminal law in New South Wales is currently governed by the Crimes Act 1900. Sections 529 and 574 of the Act refer to blasphemous libel but leave the definition of blasphemy and the penalty to the common law. Section 529 on Criminal defamation Subsection (1) abolishes the common law misdemeanour of criminal libel, but Subsection (2) states that Subsection (1) does not affect the law relating to blasphemous, seditious or obscene libel. Section 574 states that no person shall be liable to prosecution in respect of any publication by him or her orally, or otherwise, of words or matter charged as blasphemous, where the same is by way of argument, or statement, and not for the purpose of scoffing or reviling, nor of violating public decency, nor in any manner tending to a breach of the peace. Under the modern law, it is the character of the publication which will ascertain whether or not it is blasphemous. On one hand, light criticism of Christianity, made by way of argument or statement will not be punished even where it questions Christianity. Though publications created in a style which may be characterised as “scoffing or reviling, [or] violating public decency” may be blasphemous.

Section 49 (1) of the Defamation Act 1974 (NSW) states that: "The common law misdemeanour of criminal libel is abolished," but 49 (2) states, "This section does not affect the law relating to blasphemous, seditious or obscene libel." While the NSW Defamation Act 1974 was repealed by Section 46 of the Defamation Act 2005, the latter makes no mention of blasphemy or blasphemous libel, so the Defamation Act 2005 has no impact on the common law offence of blasphemous libel.

Blasphemous libel is also mentioned in section 35 of the Imperial Acts Application Act 1969 (NSW), which allows judges to seize blasphemous or seditious material from a defendant if convicted, and Schedule 3, subsection (22) of the Criminal Procedure Act 1986 (NSW).

The last successful prosecution for blasphemous libel in New South Wales took place in 1871. The case was R. v. William Lorando Jones (unreported, Parramatta Quarter Sessions, Simpson J., 18 February 1871). In that case, the elderly Mr. Jones was found guilty for saying that the Old Testament was immoral and unsuitable for a female readership. The Court sentenced Mr. Jones to a fine of £100 and two years in jail. A public outcry over the sentence resulted in the release of Mr. Jones four weeks later.

In 1994, the New South Wales Law Reform Commission recommended that all blasphemy offences be abolished without replacement. The Commission noted that the public outcry resulting from the penalty imposed upon the convicted blasphemer in the 1871 case caused far more civil unrest than the material which the prosecution was intended to suppress.

=== Queensland ===
The criminal law of Queensland was codified in 1899 with the enactment of the Criminal Code Act 1899 (Qld). Sir Samuel Walker Griffith, who was responsible for the development of the Code, stated that it did not include those provisions of English law which were "manifestly obsolete or inapplicable to Australia". All blasphemy offences were abolished in Queensland by the combined operation of Section 5 of the Code that abolished the common law offences of blasphemy and blasphemous libel and repealed the Blasphemy Act 1697 and the absence of any offence of blasphemy or blasphemous libel in the Code.

The Objectionable Literature Act 1954 (Qld) allowed the state to prevent the distribution of literature which is blasphemous, but was repealed in 1991.

The Anti-Discrimination Act 1991 (Qld) allows a person to file a complaint against anyone who commits "religious vilification," but the conduct must be directed at a person or a group of people, so it does not prohibit blasphemy outright.

=== South Australia ===
The South Australia Criminal Law Consolidation Act 1935 makes no mention of blasphemy offences. The Act abolished certain common law offences but not the common law offences of blasphemy and blasphemous libel which might yet exist.

In 1977, the Criminal Law and Penal Methods Reform Committee stated that "today it would seem anachronistic to charge anyone with blasphemous libel".

=== Tasmania ===
In late 2024, Tasmania repealed Section 119 of the Criminal Code Act 1924 (publishing blasphemous libel) and Section 12 of the Police Offences Act 1935 (blasphemous language) following advocacy from the Rationalist Society of Australia.

Prior to this, Section 3 of the Tasmania Criminal Code Act 1924 (No. 69 of 1924) repealed the Blasphemy Act 1697 and section 6 abolished the common law offences of blasphemy and blasphemous libel while Section 119 of the Criminal Code made blasphemy or blasphemous libel or both an offence, but left the definitions and penalties to common law. Section 119 formerly stated that any person who, by words spoken or intended to be read, wilfully publishes a blasphemous libel is guilty of a crime of blasphemy, that the question whether any matter so published is or is not blasphemous is a question of fact, that it is not an offence under section 119 to express in good faith and in decent language, or to attempt to establish by arguments used in good faith and conveyed in decent language, any opinion whatever upon any religious subject, and that no person shall be prosecuted under this section without the consent in writing of the Attorney-General. The maximum penalty possible was 21 years in prison.

A person who is aggrieved because aspersions are cast upon his religious belief, affiliation, or religious activity does not need to file a complaint under the Criminal Code. He can seek redress under the Anti-Discrimination Act (1998).

=== Victoria ===
The Crimes Act 1958 (Victoria) does not include blasphemy or blasphemous libel as crimes but does not abolish the common law offences. However, Section 469AA (1) (a) (Seizure and destruction of documents containing libel) of the Act allows for the seizure and destruction of documents following a conviction for publishing a "blasphemous libel", indicating that the Act recognises that the common law offence exists. The offences of blasphemy and blasphemous libel may yet exist under common law.

The Crown last laid a charge of blasphemous libel in 1919. The case concerned socialist journalist Robert Samuel Ross, who had published a satirical piece in which Bolsheviks ransack heaven. The prosecutor dropped the charge but proceeded on a charge of sending blasphemous materials through the mail. The Court convicted Ross, and sentenced him to six months of hard labour.

In 2019, Fiona Patten introduced a bill to abolish the common law offences of blasphemy and blasphemous libel in the Victorian Legislative Council; however, the bill lapsed in November 2022 at the end of the 59th Parliament.

A person who is aggrieved because someone is engaging in conduct that incites hatred against, serious contempt for, or revulsion or severe ridicule of him on the ground of his religious belief or activity can seek redress under the Racial and Religious Tolerance Act 2001.

=== Western Australia ===
The Criminal Code Act Compilation Act 1913 (WA), abolished blasphemy law in Western Australia by the combined operation of Appendix B Section 4 of the Code, which abolished the common law offences of blasphemy and blasphemous libel and repealed the Blasphemy Act 1697, and the absence of any offence of blasphemy or blasphemous libel in the Code. The Criminal Code Act Compilation Act 1913 (WA) was substantially based on the Queensland Code and Section 4 essentially mirrors section 5 of the Criminal Code Act 1899 (Qld).

=== Australian Capital Territory ===
By its Law Reform (Abolitions & Repeals) Act 1996, the Australian Capital Territory abolished the common law offence of blasphemous libel. The common law offence of blasphemy may yet exist.

=== Northern Territory ===
The Northern Territory Criminal Code Act 1983 has codified offences in the Northern Territory. The Code makes no mention of blasphemy or blasphemous libel but does not abolish the common law. The offences of blasphemy and blasphemous libel in the Northern Territory may yet exist under common law.

=== Norfolk Island ===
Before 2007, offences on Norfolk Island were determined by common law and the Crimes Act 1900 (N.S.W.) which did not abolish common law and acknowledged the offence of Blasphemous Libel under sections 529 and 574 (see New South Wales above).

The Norfolk Island Act 1979 granted the Australian external territory of Norfolk Island limited self-government and powers to pass, amend, and repeal laws. The Norfolk Island Criminal Code 2007 repealed all of the Crimes Act 1900 (N.S.W.) except for specified parts and sections – sections 529 and 574 were repealed but the common law was not abolished. This meant that the common law offences of blasphemy and blasphemous libel may have existed without the safeguards provided by section 574 of the Crimes Act 1900 (N.S.W.).

The Norfolk Island Legislative Assembly was abolished on 1 July 2015. From 1 July 2016, all New South Wales laws also apply to the approximately 2,000 residents on Norfolk Island, under both the Norfolk Island Legislation Amendment Act 2015 and the Territories Legislation Amendment Act 2016.

== See also ==
- Blasphemy law
- Blasphemy law in the United Kingdom
- Blasphemous libel
- Defamation of religion and the United Nations
- Islam and blasphemy
- Freedom of speech or Freedom of expression
- Criminal law of Australia
- International Covenant on Civil and Political Rights (ICCPR)
- International Convention on the Elimination of all Forms of Racial Discrimination (ICERD)
- Committee on the Elimination of Racial Discrimination (CERD)
- Blasphemy law in New Zealand
