= Statute of Northampton =

Act of the Parliament of England

- Act of Parliament
- Parliament of England
- Long title: None
- Citation: 2 Edw. 3
- Territorial extent: England and Wales; Ireland

Dates
- Royal assent: 1328 by Edward III of England
- Commencement: 24 April 1328 (Note: Start of session.)
- Repealed: 1 January 1970

Other legislation
- Amended by: Woollen Manufacture Act 1809; Statute Law Revision Act 1863; Statute Law (Ireland) Revision Act 1872; Civil Procedure Acts Repeal Act 1879; Sheriffs Act 1887; Statute Law Revision Act 1950Criminal Law Act 1967
- Repealed by: Statute Law (Repeals) Act 1969
- Relates to: Statute of Lincoln; Statute of Westminster 1285; Statute of Winchester; Sale of Wares after Close of Fair Act 1331

Status: Repealed

Text of statute as originally enacted

The Statute of Northampton (2 Edw. 3) was an act of the Parliament of England which met in Northampton in 1328. The parliament also ratified the Treaty of Edinburgh–Northampton which ended the First War of Scottish Independence.

== List of chapters ==
Chapter	Short title	Subject	Repealing act (if any)	
Chapter	Short title	Subject	England & Wales	Ireland
1	None	Confirmation of charters	Statute Law Revision Act 1863 (26 & 27 Vict. c. 125)	Statute Law (Ireland) Revision Act 1872 (35 & 36 Vict. c. 98)
2	Pardons for Felony, Justices of Assize, etc. Act 1328	Pardons for felony, justices of assize, etc.	Statute Law Revision and Civil Procedure Act 1881 (44 & 45 Vict. c. 59)	Statute Law Revision Act 1950 (14 Geo. 6. c. 6)
3	None	Riding or going armed	Criminal Law Act 1967	
4	None	Sheriff	Sheriffs Act 1887 (50 & 51 Vict. c. 55)	
5	None	Sheriff	Sheriffs Act 1887 (50 & 51 Vict. c. 55)	
6	None	Confirmation of statutes, etc.	Statute Law Revision Act 1863 (26 & 27 Vict. c. 125)	Statute Law (Ireland) Revision Act 1872 (35 & 36 Vict. c. 98)
7	None	Inquiry of past felons, etc.	Statute Law Revision Act 1863 (26 & 27 Vict. c. 125)	Statute Law (Ireland) Revision Act 1872 (35 & 36 Vict. c. 98)
8	None	Commands in delay of justice	Statute Law (Repeals) Act 1969 (c. 52)	
9	Staples Act 1328	The staples	Statute Law Revision Act 1863 (26 & 27 Vict. c. 125)	Statute Law (Ireland) Revision Act 1872 (35 & 36 Vict. c. 98)
10	None	Pardon of fines	Statute Law Revision Act 1863 (26 & 27 Vict. c. 125)	Statute Law (Ireland) Revision Act 1872 (35 & 36 Vict. c. 98)
11	None	Common Bench	Statute Law Revision Act 1863 (26 & 27 Vict. c. 125)	Statute Law (Ireland) Revision Act 1872 (35 & 36 Vict. c. 98)
12	None	Annexing hundreds to counties	Statute Law Revision Act 1863 (26 & 27 Vict. c. 125)	Statute Law (Ireland) Revision Act 1872 (35 & 36 Vict. c. 98)
13	None	Process for past trespasses	Statute Law Revision Act 1863 (26 & 27 Vict. c. 125)	Statute Law (Ireland) Revision Act 1872 (35 & 36 Vict. c. 98)
14	None	Measure, etc. of cloths imported	Woollen Manufacture Act 1809 (49 Geo. 3. c. 109)	
15	Keeping of Fairs Act 1328	Keeping of fairs	Statute Law (Repeals) Act 1969 (c. 52)	
16	None	Inquests	Civil Procedure Acts Repeal Act 1879 (42 & 43 Vict. c. 59)	
17	None	Writs of deceit	Statute Law Revision Act 1863 (26 & 27 Vict. c. 125)	Statute Law (Ireland) Revision Act 1872 (35 & 36 Vict. c. 98)

== Riding armed ==
Chapter 3 would later be argued in legal disputes in the United States of America about Second Amendment rights. It said

Item, it is enacted, that no man great nor small, of what condition soever he be, except the King's servants in his presence, and his ministers in executing of the King's precepts, or of their office, and such as be in their company assisting them, and also [upon a cry made for arms to keep the peace, and the same in such places where such acts happen,] be so hardy to come before the King's justices, or other of the King's ministers doing their office, with force and arms, nor bring no force in affray of the peace, nor to go nor ride armed by night nor by day, in fairs, markets, nor in the presence of the justices or other ministers, nor in no part elsewhere, upon pain to forfeit their armour to the King, and their bodies to prison at the King's pleasure.

The modern relevance of the legislation has been disputed: firearms did not exist at the time, and it is not immediately clear whether "nor to go nor to ride armed" (originally ne de chivaucher ne de daler arme in Anglo-Norman French) referred to carrying weapons or to wearing armour; it is also not clear whether it should be read primarily as permitting riding armed in the context of an official militia or posse, or as a prohibition in other situations.

== Qui tam ==
Chapter 15 regulated fairs and in particular required a lord to follow a royal charter or established usage to keep a fair open "for the Time that they ought to hold it, and no longer," with pre-publication of the closing time, subject to a fine for the lord and grievous punishment for the merchants if the fair stayed open longer.

Sale of Wares after Close of Fair Act 1331
- Act of Parliament
- Parliament of England
- Long title: The Penalty if any do sell Ware at a Fair after it is ended.
- Citation: 5 Edw. 3. c. 5
- Territorial extent: England and Wales; Ireland

Dates
- Royal assent: 1331
- Commencement: 30 September 1331 (Note: Start of session.)
- Repealed: 23 July 1958

Other legislation
- Amended by: Common Informers Act 1951
- Repealed by: Statute Law Revision Act 1958
- Relates to: Statute of Northampton

Status: Repealed

Text of statute as originally enacted

Enforcement against sales after the closing time of the fair was strengthened three years later with qui tam provisions in the Sale of Wares after Close of Fair Act 1331 (5 Edw. 3. c. 5), allowing private citizens to prosecute cases and receive a quarter of the fines based on double the value of improperly sold goods. This provision was not repealed until the Common Informers Act 1951 (14 & 15 Geo. 6. c. 39).

== See also ==
- List of acts of the Parliament of England, 1327–1376
