= Blasphemy law in New Zealand =

The publishing of any "blasphemous libel" was a crime in New Zealand under Section 123 of the Crimes Act 1961 which allowed for imprisonment for up to one year. However, Section 123 protected all publications and opinions on any religious subject expressed in good faith and decent language against prosecution and specified that prosecution may proceed only with the leave of the attorney-general.

On 5 March 2019, Parliament unanimously passed the Crimes Amendment Bill, which repealed Section 123 of the Crimes Act. The bill received the Royal Assent on 11 March 2019 and came into force the following day.

== Origin of New Zealand blasphemy law ==
In 1840, New Zealand received into law all English common law offences, including the common law offences of blasphemy and blasphemous libel, and the English Blasphemy Act 1697, titled "An Act for the more effectual suppressing of Blasphemy and Profaneness".

In 1893, the New Zealand Criminal Code Act 1893, based on the work of James Fitzjames Stephen and developments by George Burbidge in the Canadian Criminal Code, 1892, repealed specific Acts of the Westminster parliament and abolished all common law offences but replaced some offences from the repealed Acts and common law with code offences. The Code repealed the Blasphemy Act 1697 and abolished the common law offences of blasphemy and blasphemous libel but replaced the common law offence of blasphemous libel with section 133 of the Code, with safeguards to prevent overuse and abuse of the law.

Queensland followed New Zealand seven years later with the Criminal Code Act 1899 (Qld) which repealed the Blasphemy Act 1697 and abolished both common law offences, and omitted both blasphemy and blasphemous libel from the code. Sir Samuel Walker Griffith, who was responsible for the development of the Queensland code, stated that it did not include those provisions of English law which were "manifestly obsolete or inapplicable to Australia".

The New Zealand Crimes Act 1908 replaced the Criminal Code Act 1893 and the 1908 Act was in turn replaced by the Crimes Act 1961. Section 133 on blasphemous libel in the New Zealand Criminal Code Act 1893 became Section 150 of the Crimes Act 1908 and then Section 123 of the Crimes Act 1961 with minor updating of the language.

Section 6 of the 1893 Act and Section 5 of the 1908 Act abolished common law offences and other offences by repealed Acts of the Westminster parliament. Section 9 of the Crimes Act 1961 expanded Section 150 of the 1908 Act to abolish all common law offences, including blasphemy and blasphemous libel and any possibility of convictions under any Act of the Parliament of England, Great Britain, or the United Kingdom; removing any ambiguity regarding the continual existence of common law or other offences in New Zealand. However, Section 123 of the 1961 Act did not define blasphemous libel or indicate the religion to which the law applied, leaving this to the common law.

== Religion to which the offences relate ==
In England, where the offences originated, the question was considered settled in 1838 by Gathercole's Case. Baron Charles Alderson, speaking for the court, declared that "A person may, without being liable to prosecution for it, attack Judaism, or Mahomedanism, or even any sect of the Christian religion (save the established religion of the country); and the only reason why the latter is in a different situation from the others is, because it is the form established by law, and is, therefore, a part of the constitution of the country".

It might, therefore, be assumed that if the laws of blasphemy and blasphemous libel ever applied in New Zealand they applied only to the Church of England. However, as New Zealand and other states and territories within the Realm of New Zealand have never had an established religion, it is doubtful that the common law offences of blasphemy and blasphemous libel were received into New Zealand law or could be enforced in New Zealand, or that Section 123 of the Crimes Act 1961 could be applied in New Zealand.

The English blasphemy laws were also received into Australian law and the question of the religion to which the laws relate has been considered by Australian law commissions. Their findings are of direct relevance to New Zealand. In 1992, the Australian Law Reform Commission stated that "The law of blasphemy is an ancient common law offence constituted by the publication of material which provokes outrage in Christians by insulting, ridiculing or vilifying God, Christ or the Christian religion as practised in the Church of England".

In 1994, the New South Wales Law Reform Commission added that "The common law offence of blasphemy applies only to scurrilous criticism of the fundamental tenets of the Church of England and other Christian denominations of coincident conviction. Such discrimination by the law in favour of a particular religion is itself an indicator of the need for review and possible reform."

In 1998, the Australian Human Rights and Equal Opportunity Commission in a report titled Article 18 – Freedom of religion and belief made use of the following definition: "Blasphemy is an ancient English common law offence defined as a publication containing contemptuous, reviling, scurrilous or ludicrous matter relating to God, Jesus Christ, the Bible or the formularies of the Church of England which are calculated to provoke outrage in the feelings of any sympathiser or believer in Christianity. A person who publishes any blasphemous document is guilty of publishing a blasphemous libel."

== Position of the Anglican church ==
The New Zealand law of blasphemous libel originated with the English common law offences of blasphemy and blasphemous libel that were intended to protect the tenets of the Church of England, but the Church of England no longer supports the retention of these laws, either in England or New Zealand.

At a meeting in the chapel of the Houses of Parliament in early 2015, Justin Welby, Archbishop of Canterbury, said that Christians must stand up for religious freedom of atheists and Muslims as much as themselves and that he was opposed to all restrictions on freedom of speech concerning religion which did not constitute hate speech. He thanked the former MP Evan Harris, a humanist, for his efforts to abolish the blasphemy laws in the UK.

Interviewed by The Dominion Post on 8 May 2017, Anglican Archbishop Philip Richardson said the law against blasphemous libel was pointless, saying "My view is, God's bigger than needing to be defended by the Crimes Act". Richardson, known as Bishop of Taranaki and Tikanga Pakeha Archbishop and Primate of the Anglican Church in Aotearoa, New Zealand and Polynesia, said that he found it surprising New Zealand still had a blasphemy law in place. In a different interview he added: "It is an archaic and unhelpful law and it should be repealed. Freedom of speech is a fundamental of democracy, and indeed as any parent knows, freedom is a consequence of love."

== Law Commission reports ==
The New Zealand Law Commission has not given close consideration to the abolition of New Zealand's blasphemy laws. Law Commissions in England, where the laws originated, and Australia have however considered the question and recommended the abolition of all blasphemy laws.

=== England ===
In England, the continued existence of the common law offences of blasphemy and blasphemous libel was controversial. In 1985 the Law Commission published a report on Criminal Law: Offences against Religious and Public Worship, that recommended the abolition of all blasphemy offences. The report noted that "there is no one agreed definition of blasphemy and blasphemous libel and that it would scarcely be practicable, even if it thought desirable, to amend the common law definition by statute". The authors added that "it is now clear that none of the arguments for retaining a law of blasphemy are sufficiently strong to support this view and each of them is outweighed by other considerations which persuade us that a law of blasphemy is not a necessary part of a criminal code. Moreover, we have no doubt that any replacement offence which might be devised would in practice prove to be unacceptably wide in ambit." The Commission concluded, "that the common law offences of blasphemy and blasphemous libel should be abolished without replacement". These two offences were subsequently abolished in July 2008.

=== Australia ===
As Australian blasphemy law shares a common origin with New Zealand blasphemy law, Australian law commission reports are relevant to New Zealand.

In 1992, the Australian Law Reform Commission produced Report 57 on Multiculturalism and the Law which "considers the role of the common law offence of blasphemy in federal law". The Commission noted that as blasphemy is not specifically defined in any Australian legislation it must be assumed that the English common law definition of blasphemy applies.

The Commission considered Australia's international obligations under covenants and conventions to which Australia is a party: The International Covenant on Civil and Political Rights (ICCPR) guarantees freedom of thought, conscience and religion, freedom of expression, the enjoyment of one's culture, the profession and practice of one's religion and the use of one's own language in community with other members of one's ethnic and religious community; and parties to the International Convention on the Elimination of All Forms of Racial Discrimination (CERD), undertake to guarantee the right of everyone to equality before the law and equality in the enjoyment of the rights to freedom of thought, conscience and religion, freedom of opinion and expression, and freedom of peaceful assembly and association.

The commission noted that blasphemy law provides only limited protection as religious affiliations are many and diverse. Although most Australians describe themselves as Christian, a growing minority (more than 300,000 in 1986) are members of non-Christian religious faiths, particularly Islam, Buddhism and Judaism, and that nearly two million Australians do not subscribe to any religion. The offence of blasphemy, however, protects only the Christian religion, with specific reference to the rituals and doctrines of the Anglican Church. Offences that involve the common law of blasphemy apply only to material that vilifies Christianity. This is not consistent with Australia's human rights obligations.

The commission proposed that all references to 'blasphemous' material in federal law should be removed. The commission reported that "it is argued that extending blasphemy law to cover all religions would raise serious difficulties in defining 'religions' and 'gods', would have grave consequences for freedom of speech and might contribute to religious conflict. On the other hand, removing all references to blasphemy in federal law would have the effect of removing an apparently preferential position of one religion and moving towards a situation of parity between religions in federal law. For this reason it should be done. In so far as blasphemy causes hurt to a person's sensibilities, the existing provisions on offensive behaviour and other public order offences are sufficient." The report concluded with the recommendation that the criminal law be amended so that "all references to blasphemy in federal legislation should be removed".

==== New South Wales ====
In 1994 the New South Wales Law Reform Commission released a report on blasphemy after considering the law in New South Wales, other Australian states and territories, other jurisdictions in the region, the history of the law, international developments, freedom of speech, and public submissions. After considering possible options, the Commission recommended that all blasphemy law be abolished without replacement. The Commission pointed out that every other law reform agency in Australia and in other common law countries which had considered the question had likewise recommended the abolition of the offence of blasphemy. The report with its conclusions and recommendation is equally applicable to other Australian states and territories.

== Prosecutions in New Zealand ==
The only prosecution for blasphemous libel in New Zealand before the 2019 repeal of section 123 of the Crimes Act 1961 was the case of John Glover, publisher of the newspaper The Maoriland Worker in 1922 for the publication of two poems by British poet Siegfried Sassoon, although the poems were widely available in other publications and bookstores at the time. The Crown laid a charge of blasphemous libel over the 12 October 1921 issue of The Maoriland Worker which included the two poems. The alleged blasphemy was the closing lines of Sassoon's poem 'Stand-to: Good Friday Morning':

O Jesus, send me a wound to-day,
And I'll believe in Your bread and wine,
And get my bloody old sins washed white!

The case was tried in the Supreme Court, now known as the High Court, in 1922. The jury returned a verdict of not guilty with a rider: "That similar publications of such literature be discouraged". The Supreme Court of 1922 was established in 1841 but renamed the High Court in 1980 to allow for the establishment of a higher court known as the Supreme Court of New Zealand in 2004.

In 1998, the Crown decided not to prosecute Te Papa museum for displaying Tania Kovats' Virgin in a Condom and Sam Taylor-Wood's Wrecked, a contemporary photograph based on Leonardo da Vinci's, The Last Supper, which featured a topless woman at the centre of the table in place of Christ. In 2006, the Crown decided not to pursue blasphemy charges against CanWest, a broadcaster, for airing an episode of South Park featuring a menstruating Virgin Mary statue. The former section 123(4) of the Crimes Act 1961 required the leave of the Attorney-General before charges of blasphemous libel could proceed. The Attorney-General usually refused to pursue prosecutions on the basis of free speech objections as the right to free speech is protected by the New Zealand Bill of Rights Act 1990.

== Censorship ==
Apart from the use of Section 123 of the Crimes Act 1961, attempts have been made to censor films and television programmes considered blasphemous using broadcasting standards and film censorship legislation such as the Films, Videos, and Publications Classification Act 1993 and the Broadcasting Act 1989.

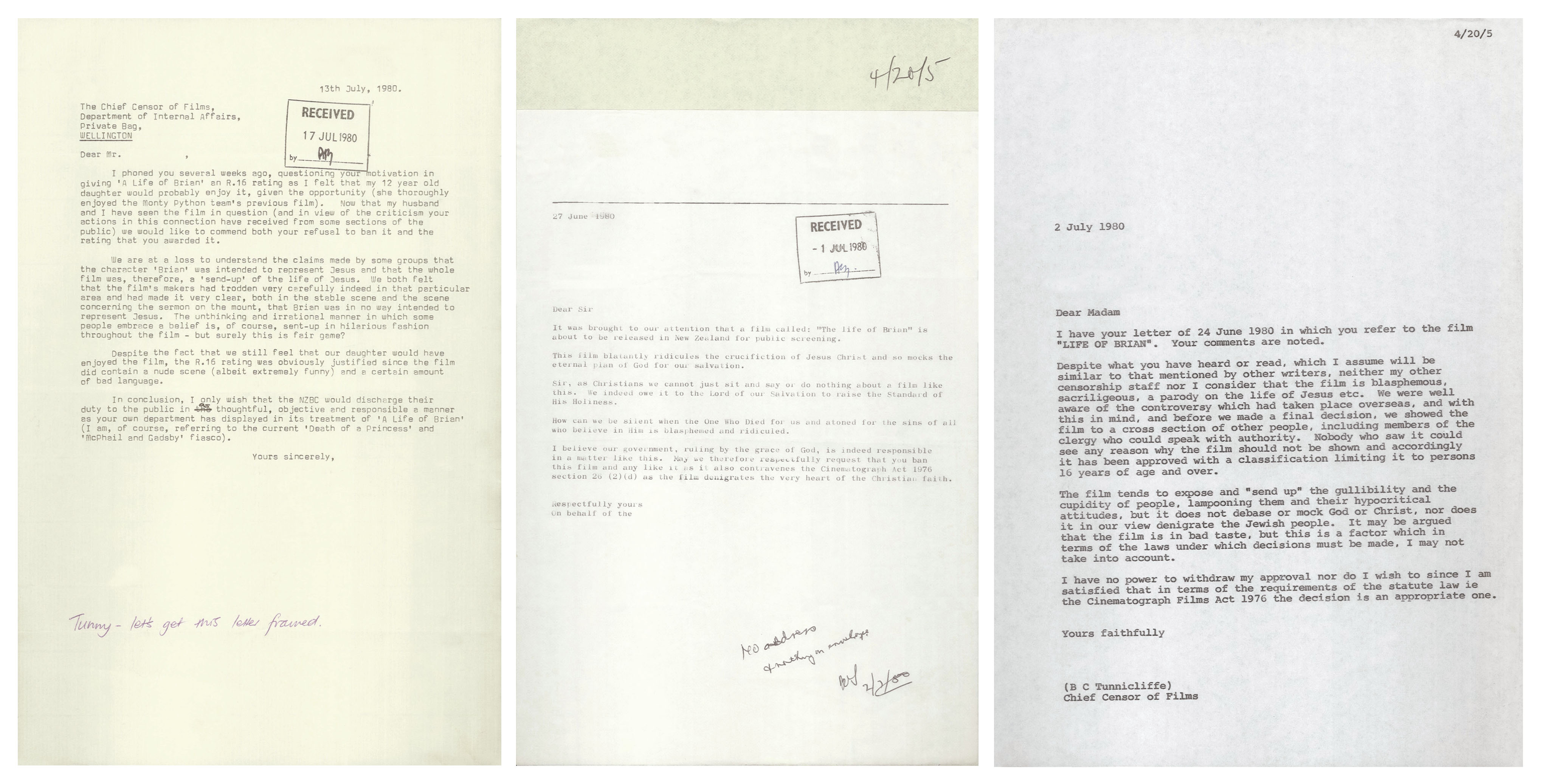
Correspondence on whether Monty Python's Life of Brian (1979) should be banned in New Zealand for blasphemy

The British comedy film Monty Python's Life of Brian (1979) about a fictional Jewish man living at the same time and neighbourhood as Jesus Christ, generated significant international controversy and was banned in several countries including Ireland and Norway. Hundreds of letters were sent to the New Zealand Film Censor's Office to have the film banned in New Zealand as well on the grounds of it being 'blasphemous' against the Christian faith, but the Chief Censor of Films responded by stating that they had found no evidence of blasphemy or sacrilegiousness in the film.

In February 2006, the broadcaster CanWest screened the "Bloody Mary" episode of the South Park cartoon series featuring a menstruating Virgin Mary statue. The following June, the Broadcasting Standards Authority responded to complaints by upholding CanWest's right to broadcast the episode finding no breach of the Television Code of Broadcasting Practice. The High Court, considering an appeal by Bishop Denis Browne, in his capacity as the President of the Catholic Bishops Conference, affirmed the Broadcasting Standards Authority's decision in July 2007.

Dismissing the appeal in the High Court, Justice Wild said that he was "not prepared to second-guess the weight that the Authority accorded to the right to freedom of expression, relative to the right to respect for religious beliefs" and was not prepared to accept that the Authority was wrong to hold that the episode did not breach the standard of good taste and decency. Justice Wild noted that the four members of the Authority were unanimous and that the Conference's sense of outrage was not shared by the wider community.

In November 2021, the Broadcasting Standards Authority issued guidance on complaints that are unlikely to succeed, including complaints regarding blasphemous language such as 'God', 'Jesus', 'Christ' and 'Hell'. It said that in a modern secular society, such language had become a part of everyday speech and did not threaten widely shared community standards of good taste and decency.

== New Zealand blasphemy law and the United Nations ==
New Zealand signed the International Covenant on Civil and Political Rights (ICCPR) on 12 November 1968, ratified it on 28 December 1978 and it came into force on 28 March 1979. This covenant binds signatory countries.

The UN Human Rights Committee adopted General Comment 34 in July 2011 that stated in paragraph 48 that "Prohibitions of displays of lack of respect for a religion or other belief system, including blasphemy laws, are incompatible with the Covenant … ".

In July 2012, the Office of the United Nations High Commissioner for Human Rights (OHCHR) released the Rabat Plan of Action which develops this further. Paragraph 19 states that "At the national level, blasphemy laws are counter-productive, since they may result in the de facto censure of all inter-religious/belief and intra-religious/belief dialogue, debate, and also criticism, most of which could be constructive, healthy and needed. The plan concludes that "States that have blasphemy laws should repeal these as such laws have a stifling impact on the enjoyment of freedom of religion or belief and healthy dialogue and debate about religion".

New Zealand also signed the International Convention on the Elimination of All Forms of Racial Discrimination (ICERD) on 25 October 1966 and ratified it on 22 November 1972. This Convention includes an individual complaints mechanism, effectively making it enforceable against its parties, and is monitored by the Committee on the Elimination of Racial Discrimination (CERD). Parties to ICERD undertake to guarantee the right of everyone to equality before the law and equality in the enjoyment of the rights to freedom of thought, conscience and religion, freedom of opinion and expression.

Any New Zealand laws that prohibit or might prohibit "blasphemy", "blasphemous libel" and "denigration of religion" contravene international law, are discriminatory, and contravene New Zealand's obligations under both the ICCPR and ICERD.

== Repeal of the law ==
In May 2017 an amendment to the omnibus Statutes Repeal Bill 2016 was tabled to repeal Section 123 of the Crimes Act 1961, however, it was voted down by one vote on the basis that the matter should be considered separately from that bill in order to allow public submissions. On 1 February 2018, a private member's bill, "Crimes (Offence of Blasphemous Libel) Amendment Bill", was introduced to parliament. This Bill was withdrawn on 21 March 2018 following the introduction of a government-sponsored Crimes amendment Bill on 19 March which superseded it.

On 19 March 2018, Justice Minister Andrew Little introduced a "Crimes Amendment Bill" to update the Crimes Act 1961. The bill would repeal three provisions of the Crimes Act 1961 considered to be out of date and not representing contemporary New Zealand attitudes, including repeal of Section 123. The bill passed the first reading on 28 March and was referred to the Justice select committee. The select committee received submissions in support of repeal from the Ministry of Justice, the Human Rights Commission, the New Zealand Council of Civil Liberties, and other organisations and individuals, and opposing repeal from a small number of individuals. The committee reported back on 28 September with the recommendation that repeal of Section 123 proceed without change. The Bill passed the second reading on 11 December 2018, the Committee of the Whole House on 20 February 2019, and the third reading on 5 March 2019 with the unanimous support of the House. It received the royal assent on 11 March and came into force on 12 March 2019 repealing Section 123 of the Crimes Act 1961.

== See also ==
- Blasphemy law
- Blasphemy law in Australia
- Blasphemy law in the United Kingdom
- Defamation of religion and the United Nations
- Freedom of speech
- Hate speech law in New Zealand
- Irreligion in New Zealand
- Islam and blasphemy
- Religion in New Zealand
