= Irreligion in New Zealand =

Irreligion in New Zealand refers to the absence of religious affiliation, belief, or practice among people in the country. New Zealand is considered one of the most secular nations in the world, with the proportion of the population reporting "no religion" rising steadily since the late twentieth century. In the 2023 census, a majority of New Zealanders (51.6%) identified as having no religion, marking the first time irreligion became the dominant category of belief.

Irreligion in New Zealand has historical roots in nineteenth‑century freethought and rationalist movements, and has been expressed through organisations such as the New Zealand Rationalist and Humanist Association, Humanist NZ, and NZ Skeptics. While these groups have remained relatively small, they have played a visible role in debates over secular education, freedom of expression, and the separation of church and state.

Legal protections for irreligion are guaranteed under the New Zealand Bill of Rights Act 1990, which affirms freedom of thought, conscience, and belief, and under the Oaths and Declarations Act 1957, which allows secular affirmations in place of religious oaths. Political and social tensions have periodically arisen around the role of religion in schools, the use of religious language in civic life, and the visibility of non‑religious perspectives in public debate. The repeal of the country's blasphemy law in 2019 and the growth of secular demographics in the 21st century have further underscored the prominence of irreligion in New Zealand society.

== Freedom of belief ==
New Zealand has no state religion and section 13 of the New Zealand Bill of Rights Act 1990 affirms the right to freedom of thought, conscience, religion, and belief, explicitly encompassing the freedom to hold non-religious or irreligious views. This legal protection ensures that individuals are not compelled to adopt religious beliefs or participate in religious practices, and that irreligious identities—such as atheism, agnosticism, and secular humanism—are afforded the same civil liberties as religious affiliations. In the context of New Zealand's growing secular demographic, section 13 serves as a foundational safeguard for the rights of those who identify as having no religion, reinforcing the country's commitment to pluralism and freedom of belief.

== Demographics ==
The increase of the proportion of the population recorded as having 'no religion' over the last six censuses

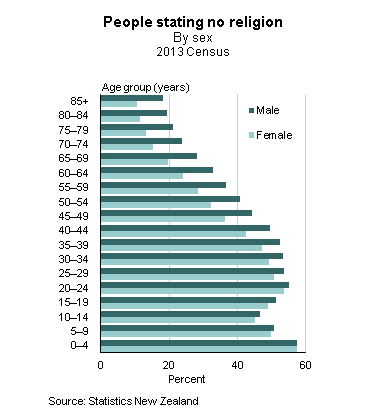
2013 Census graph of people stating no religion by sex and age. Irreligion is highest among males and younger generations.

Statistics New Zealand gathers information on religious affiliation in the five-yearly census. Completing a census form is compulsory by law for every person in New Zealand on census night but respondents are able to object to answering the question of religious affiliation, and around 6% do object. The trend shows an increasing proportion of residents in New Zealand declaring no religious affiliation. In the 1991 census, 20.2% were in this category. The proportion more than doubled in two decades, reaching 41.9% in the 2013 census, and increased again to 48.2% in the 2018 census, when for the first time a plurality of New Zealanders claimed "no religion". This became a 51.6% majority in the 2023 census.

There is significant debate among sociologists about the interpretation of this trend in census data. The increase in those indicating 'no religion' is often cited in support of the secularisation thesis. An alternative theory is that the data indicates a decline in institutional religious affiliation rather than simply a decrease in spiritual belief. A 1985 survey showed that around one-quarter of those answering 'no religion' may believe in a god and that, conversely, between 7% and 36% of Christians (depending on their denomination) did not believe in the existence of deities.

The International Social Survey Programme was conducted in New Zealand by Massey University in 2008. It received mail-responses from around one thousand New Zealanders above the age of 18, surveying issues of religious belief and practice. The results of this survey indicated that 72% of the population believed in a god or a higher power, 15% were agnostic, and 13% were atheist (with a 3% margin of error).

According to a report by the American Physical Society, religion may die out in New Zealand and eight other Western world countries.

== Organised irreligion ==
Organised irreligion in New Zealand has roots in the freethought movement of the nineteenth century, when secularist associations promoted science, rational inquiry, and the separation of church and state. Two premiers, Robert Stout and John Ballance, were noted freethinkers, reflecting the influence of secularist ideas in public life.

The most enduring institutional body is the New Zealand Rationalist and Humanist Association (NZRHA), founded in the 1920s, which has campaigned for secular education, the repeal of blasphemy laws, and the removal of religious privilege in legislation. Other groups include the Humanist Society of New Zealand, which emphasises human rights and social justice, and the NZ Skeptics, established in the late twentieth century to promote scientific inquiry and critique pseudoscience. More recently, global networks such as Atheist Republic have established local chapters, providing community for non‑believers.

Although membership in these organisations is modest compared to religious denominations, they have played a visible role in public debates on education, law, and secular policy, reflecting the broader growth of irreligion in New Zealand society.

== Repeal of blasphemy law ==
Until 2019, New Zealand law retained the offence of blasphemous libel under section 123 of the Crimes Act 1961, carrying a maximum penalty of one year's imprisonment. Although the provision had existed since the nineteenth century, it was rarely invoked and no successful prosecutions were ever recorded. The last attempted prosecution occurred in 1922, when a jury returned a not guilty verdict.

Secular and humanist organisations, including the New Zealand Rationalist and Humanist Association and Humanist NZ, campaigned for decades to remove the law, arguing that it privileged religion over irreligion and conflicted with the right to freedom of expression under the New Zealand Bill of Rights Act 1990. In March 2019, Parliament unanimously passed the Crimes Amendment Bill, which repealed Section 123. Justice Minister Andrew Little described the offence as "archaic" and inconsistent with modern human rights standards.

The repeal was welcomed by secular groups as a symbolic affirmation of New Zealand's commitment to freedom of belief and expression, and as strengthening the country's ability to criticise blasphemy laws abroad without hypocrisy.

== Secular state education ==
The place of religion in New Zealand's state education system has been a recurring source of controversy. The Education Act 1877 established the principles of free, compulsory, and "wholly secular" primary education, but included a provision allowing school buildings to be used outside official hours for religious instruction. In 1962, Parliament formalised this arrangement by permitting schools to "close" for short periods during the day so that voluntary religious instructors could teach, while maintaining that teaching during official hours remained secular.

In practice, Christian instruction has been offered in many primary and intermediate schools under "Bible in Schools" programmes, often delivered by volunteers from local churches. Critics, including the Secular Education Network and the New Zealand Rationalist and Humanist Association, argue that this system undermines the principle of secular education, privileges Christianity over other worldviews, and can place pressure on children from non‑religious or minority faith backgrounds. Supporters contend that participation is voluntary and reflects community values.

The issue has been the subject of complaints to the Human Rights Commission and occasional legal challenges, with opponents claiming that the practice breaches the New Zealand Bill of Rights Act 1990 guarantee of freedom of belief. Debate has also extended to the inclusion of Māori spiritual concepts in schools, with some commentators arguing that secularism should apply equally to Christian and indigenous practices. The question of religion in schools remains a live issue in New Zealand's broader discussion of secularism and irreligion.

== "There's probably no God" campaign ==
In 2009–2010, New Zealand secular activists launched a local version of the international "Atheist Bus Campaign", which sought to display the slogan "There's probably no God. Now stop worrying and enjoy your life" on buses in major cities. The campaign raised over NZ$20,000 in public donations, with plans to place advertisements in Auckland, Wellington, and Christchurch. However, NZ Bus, the country's largest bus operator, declined to run the advertisements, citing concerns that the message was too controversial and divisive. The decision prompted complaints to the Human Rights Commission and sparked public debate over freedom of expression and the visibility of irreligious perspectives in New Zealand. While some religious leaders welcomed the refusal, others acknowledged the campaigners' right to express their views, and the controversy highlighted ongoing tensions around secularism and public space in New Zealand.

== Political and social tensions ==
The growth of irreligion in New Zealand has been shaped by broader political and social dynamics rather than by formal institutions alone. In the late nineteenth century, secularist leaders such as Premier Robert Stout promoted rationalist and freethought ideals, positioning themselves against the dominance of denominational Christianity in public life. These tensions reflected wider divisions imported from Britain, where Anglicans, Presbyterians, Catholics, and dissenters competed for influence, and where secularists sought to limit the political authority of churches.

During the twentieth century, religious language continued to shape political discourse even as secularisation advanced. The first Labour government's welfare reforms, for example, were described by some commentators as "applied Christianity," illustrating how Christian moral frameworks were invoked to legitimise social policy. At the same time, secularist voices emphasised reason, science, and civic equality as alternative foundations for national identity. In addition, the right to make a secular affirmation instead of swearing a religious oath in court or other official settings, guaranteed under the Oaths and Declarations Act 1957, has been viewed as an important safeguard for irreligious New Zealanders, ensuring equal participation in civic and legal processes without reference to religious belief.

By the early twenty‑first century, the steady rise of "no religion" in census data reflected not only private belief but also a cultural shift in which irreligion became increasingly normalised in public life. This demographic change has influenced debates over national identity, political rhetoric, and the role of spirituality in civic culture, underscoring the continuing interplay between religious and irreligious perspectives in New Zealand society.

== See also ==
- Blasphemy law in New Zealand
- Demographics of atheism
- Religion in New Zealand
- Socialism in New Zealand
