= Blasphemy Act 1697 =

Act of the Parliament of England

Blasphemy Act 1697 (Note: The citation of this act by this short title was authorised by section 5 of, and the second schedule to, the Statute Law Revision Act 1948. Due to the repeal of those provisions, it is now authorised by section 19(2) of the Interpretation Act 1978.) (Note: This act might be referred to as the Blasphemy Act 1698 in some sources due to the situation that existed before the passing of the Acts of Parliament (Commencement) Act 1793.)
- Act of Parliament
- Parliament of England
- Long title: An Act for the more effectual suppressing of Blasphemy and Profaneness. (Note: These words are printed against this act in the second column of the second schedule to the Statute Law Revision Act 1948, which is headed "Title".)
- Citation: 9 Will. 3 c. 35 (Note: This is the citation in The Statutes of the Realm.); 9 & 10 Will. 3. c. 32 (Note: This is the citation in The Statutes at Large.)
- Territorial extent: England and Wales; British Colonies

Dates
- Royal assent: 5 July 1698
- Commencement: 3 December 1697 (Note: Start of session.)
- Repealed: 1 January 1968
Other legislation
Amended by	Doctrine of the Trinity Act 1813; Statute Law Revision Act 1888; Magistrates' Courts Act 1952
Repealed by	New Zealand: Criminal Code Act 1893; Queensland: Criminal Code Act 1899; England and Wales: Criminal Law Act 1967

Status: Repealed

Text of statute as originally enacted

The Blasphemy Act 1697 (9 Will. 3. c. 35) was an act of the Parliament of England. It made it an offence for any person, educated in or having made profession of the Christian religion, by writing, preaching, teaching or advised speaking, to deny the Holy Trinity, to claim there is more than one god, to deny the truth of Christianity and to deny the Bible as divine authority.

The first offence resulted in being rendered incapable of holding any office or place of trust. The second offence resulted in being rendered incapable of bringing any action, of being guardian or executor, or of taking a legacy or deed of gift, and three years imprisonment without bail.

The act was directed against apostates at the beginning of the deist movement in England, particularly after the 1696 publication of John Toland's book Christianity not Mysterious.

The Trinitarian provision was amended by the Doctrine of the Trinity Act 1813 to remove the penalties from Unitarians.

== Subsequent developments ==
The act was rarely applied: the legislation allowed only four days after the offence for a formal complaint to be lodged and the trial itself was required to be held within three months. As a result, existing common law process continued to be the first line against heterodoxy in England and Wales.

The Law Commission said that they were not aware of any prosecutions that had taken place under the act.

On 24 May 1966, the Law Commission said that the offence created by this statute was obsolete and recommended that the whole act be repealed.Their recommendation was implemented and the whole act was repealed by section 13(2) of, and part I of schedule 4 to, the Criminal Law Act 1967.

The whole act was repealed by section 10(2) of, and part I of schedule 3 to, the Criminal Law Act 1967, which came into force on 1 January 1968.

For the effect of this act on the common law offences, see Blasphemy law in the United Kingdom - Relationship between the common law and statutory offences.

=== British Colonies ===
The Blasphemy Act 1697 is known to have been received into law in various British Colonies on different dates.

Queensland received the Act in 1828 and repealed it with the Criminal Code Act of 1899. New Zealand received the Blasphemy Act 1697 in 1840 and repealed it with the Criminal Code Act of 1893.

The Blasphemy Act 1697 may yet exist in other former colonies and territories.

== See also ==
- Blasphemy law in the United Kingdom
- Blasphemy law in Australia
- Blasphemy law in New Zealand

== Bibliography ==
- Webb, R.K. "From Toleration to Religious Liberty" Liberty Secured? Britain before and after 1688 Edited by J.R. Jones (Stanford: Stanford University Press, 1992) p 162 ISBN 0-8047-1988-8
