= Maintenance and Embracery Act 1540 =

Act of the Parliament of England

Maintenance and Embracery Act 1540 (Note: The citation of this act by this short title was authorised by section 5 of, and the second schedule to, the Statute Law Revision Act 1948. Due to the repeal of those provisions, it is now authorised by section 19(2) of the Interpretation Act 1978. The citation of this act as the Maintenance and Embracery Act 1540 is authorised for the Republic of Ireland by section 4 of, and part 2 of schedule 1 to, the Statute Law Revision Act 2007.)
- Act of Parliament
- Parliament of England
- Long title: Agenst maintenaunce and embracery byeng of titles, &c.
- Citation: 32 Hen. 8. c. 9
- Territorial extent: England and Wales

Dates
- Royal assent: 24 July 1540
- Commencement: 12 April 1540 (Note: Start of session.)
- Repealed: 21 July 1967

Other legislation
- Amended by: Statute Law Revision Act 1863; Statute Law Revision Act 1888; Perjury Act 1911; Statute Law Revision Act 1948; Common Informers Act 1951
- Repealed by: Criminal Law Act 1967

Status: Repealed

Text of statute as originally enacted

The Maintenance and Embracery Act 1540 (32 Hen. 8. c. 9) was an act of the Parliament of England.

== Subsequent developments ==
=== Amendments ===
Section 5 of the act was repealed by section 1 of, and the schedule to, the Statute Law Revision Act 1863 (26 & 27 Vict. c. 125), which came into force on 28 July 1863.

The words "or suborne any witnes by Ires, rewardis, promises, or by any other sinistre labour or meanes," and the words "or to the procurement or occasion of any manner of pjury by false verdict or otherwise" were repealed by section 17 of, and the schedule to, the Perjury Act 1911 (1 & 2 Geo. 5. c. 6).

The words from "the Sterre Chamber" to "marches of the same", except the words "or elliswhere within England", were repealed, and the words "of dett bill playnte" were repealed, by section 1 of, and schedule 1 to, the Statute Law Revision Act 1948 (11 & 12 Geo. 6. c. 62).

The words "of dett bill playnte" in section 6 of the act were repealed by section 1 of, and schedule 1 to, the Statute Law Revision Act 1948 (11 & 12 Geo. 6. c. 62).

The institution of proceedings under this section was restricted by sections 1 and 3 of, and the schedule to, the Common Informers Act 1951 (14 & 15 Geo. 6. c. 39).

=== Repeal ===
In 1966, the Law Commission recommended that section 3 of the act be repealed. They said that there was no sense in having a special rule for actions concerned with land.

Any offence under this act, to the extent to which it depended on any provision of this act, was abolished for England and Wales on 21 July 1967 by section 13(1)(b) of the Criminal Law Act 1967.

The whole act was repealed for England and Wales on 21 July 1967 by section 13(2) of, and part I of schedule 4 to, the Criminal Law Act 1967.

The act was retained for the Republic of Ireland by section 2(2)(a) of and part 2 of schedule 1 to, the Statute Law Revision Act 2007.

== Provisions ==
Section 3 of the act introduced, as an alternative to criminal prosecution, a common informer action for certain forms of interference with the course of justice in legal proceedings that were concerned with the title to land.
