= Sale of Horses Act 1555 =

Act of the Parliament of England

Sale of Horses Act 1555 (Note: The citation of this act by this short title was authorised by section 1 of, and the first schedule to, the Short Titles Act 1896. Due to the repeal of those provisions it is now authorised by section 19(2) of the Interpretation Act 1978.)
- Act of Parliament
- Parliament of England
- Long title: An Acte agaynst the byeng of Stolen Horses. (Note: These words are printed against this act in the second column of the second schedule to the Statute Law Revision Act 1948, which is headed "Title".)
- Citation: 2 & 3 Ph. & M. c. 7
- Territorial extent: England and Wales

Dates
- Royal assent: 9 December 1555
- Commencement: 21 October 1555 (Note: Start of session.)
- Repealed: 1 January 1968
Other legislation
Amended by	Sale of Horses Act 1588; Statute Law Revision Act 1888
Repealed by	Criminal Law Act 1967
Relates to	Common Informers Act 1951

Status: Repealed

Text of statute as originally enacted

The Sale of Horses Act 1555 (2 & 3 Ph. & M. c. 7) was an act of the Parliament of England.

== Subsequent developments ==
As to common informer actions under this act, see section 1 of, and the schedule to, the Common Informers Act 1951 (14 & 15 Geo. 6. c. 39).

The whole act was repealed by section 10(2) of, and part I of schedule 3 to, the Criminal Law Act 1967, which came into force on 1 January 1968.

== See also ==
- Sale of Horses Act 1588
