= Sale of Horses Act 1588 =

Act of the Parliament of England

Sale of Horses Act 1588 (Note: The citation of this act by this short title was authorised by section 5 of, and the second schedule to, the Statute Law Revision Act 1948. Due to the repeal of those provisions, it is now authorised by section 19(2) of the Interpretation Act 1978.)
- Act of Parliament
- Parliament of England
- Long title: An Acte to avoyde Horse stealinge. (Note: These words are printed against this act in the second column of the second schedule to the Statute Law Revision Act 1948, which is headed "Title".)
- Citation: 31 Eliz. 1. c. 12
- Territorial extent: England and Wales

Dates
- Royal assent: 29 March 1589
- Commencement: 18 April 1589 (Note: Section 1. 20 days after the end of the next session of parliament.)
- Repealed: 1 January 1968

Other legislation
- Amends: Sale of Horses Act 1555
- Amended by: Criminal Statutes Repeal Act 1827; Statute Law Revision Act 1888
- Repealed by: Criminal Law Act 1967
- Relates to: Sale of Horses Act 1555

Status: Repealed

Text of statute as originally enacted

The Sale of Horses Act 1588 (31 Eliz. 1. c. 12) was an act of the Parliament of England.

The act limited exempted the sale of horses from the rule of market overt.

== Subsequent developments ==
The whole act was repealed by section 10(2) of, and part I of schedule 3 to, the Criminal Law Act 1967, which came into force on 1 January 1968.

== See also ==
- Sale of Horses Act 1555
