= Persona Digital Telephony Ltd v Minister for Public Enterprise, Ireland =

Irish Supreme Court case

Persona Digital Telephony Ltd v. Minister for Public Enterprise, Ireland
- Coat of arms of Ireland
- Court: Supreme Court of Ireland
- Full case name: Persona Digital Telephony Limited & Sigma Wireless Networks Limited and The Minister for Public Enterprise, Ireland and the Attorney General, and, by order, Denis O’Brien and Michael Lowry
- Decided: 23 May 2017
- Citation: [2017] IESC 27

Case history
- Appealed from: High Court
- Appealed to: Supreme Court

Court membership
- Judges sitting: Clarke J., MacMenamin J., Dunne J.

Case opinions
- Decision by: Denham C.J
- Dissent: McKechnie J.

Keywords
- Practice and Procedure, Professional Malpractice, Legal Malpractice

Persona Digital Telephony Ltd v Minister for Public Enterprise, Ireland, [2017] IESC 27; was an Irish Supreme Court case in which the Court ruled that third party funding to support a plaintiff's legal costs and disbursements is unlawful.

== Background ==
The directors of the plaintiffs/appellants, Persona Digital Telephony Ltd and Sigma Wireless Networks Ltd, entered into an investment agreement with Harbour Fund III, LP to provide financial backing for the plaintiffs’ legal costs and disbursements that would be incurred by the plaintiffs in the proceedings, including for the purchase of the plaintiffs’ adverse costs insurance, and to otherwise protect the assets of the plaintiffs against any adverse costs order made in or relating to any such proceedings. It was a condition of the agreement that the parties enter into a security agreement. The plaintiffs contended that the third party funding scheme should be considered in context, and that the question should be asked whether, on the whole, the transaction amounts to unlawful maintenance or champerty, or whether it should be viewed as enabling a claim of public importance to proceed and to ensure the constitutional guarantee of access to justice.

The first three defendants/respondents, the State, submitted that maintenance and champerty are criminal offences as well as torts. The State submitted that the funding agreement was void for illegality, and that the plaintiffs were asking the Court to vary the scope of the offences and torts of maintenance and champerty, which was not within the jurisdiction of the Court.

Ms. Justice Donnelly (High Court) refused to grant the desired declaratory relief to the plaintiffs. The Court held that it was well-settled law that third-party litigation funding agreement in return for a share of the proceeds where the third party had no independent or bona fide interest constituted an abuse of process. The Court opined that it was for the appellate court to adopt the modern outlook on the concept of propriety having regard to the changing ideas on public policy and not the High Court.

== Holding of the Supreme Court ==
The Court (Denham C.J.) granted leave for appeal. The issue the court permitted this was;

‘Whether third party funding, provided during the course of proceedings (rather than at their outset) to support a plaintiff who is unable to progress a case of immense "public importance" is unlawful by reason of the rules on maintenance and champerty.’

The court held that the fact that the funding was provided during the course of the proceedings was not a relevant factor. Denham CJ did not consider the fact that the case was described as one of immense public importance to be a relevant factor. However, Denham CJ did consider that third party funding to support a plaintiff (where none of the exceptions apply) is unlawful by reason of the rules on champerty. Denham CJ noted that none of the exceptions arose in this case.

Therefore, the appeal was dismissed.

=== Dissents ===
McKechnie J. dissented from the Judgment of Denham C.J and other concurring Justices stating that the court's effective termination of the Persona litigation by reference to maintenance and champerty was 'both highly disturbing and terribly disquieting' and resulted in an outcome that was 'manifestly troublesome troublesome from the perspective of giving effect to the constitutional right of access to courts'.
