= Local Government Regulation =

Local Government Regulation is one of the six bodies that form the Local Government Group overseen by the Local Government Association (LGA). It provides advice and guidance to a number of regulatory services in the United Kingdom. The organisation provides guidance notes at its website and appoints some Local Authority experts as 'Lead Officers', contacts who will advise other officers.

It was originally established in 1978 as Local Authorities Coordination of Trading Standards (LACOTS), supporting and attempting to ensure uniform enforcement by the Local Authority-based Trading Standards departments. Since 1991 it has also expanded to cover food safety, gambling, civil registration and a number of other enforcement functions and known as Local Authorities Coordinators of Regulatory Services (LACORS). It was renamed to its current title in July 2010 along with other members of the Local Government Group as part of the latter's 'Getting Closer' initiative.

It is funded by a mix of money 'top-sliced' from local authorities' Revenue Support Grant (RSG) payments from the UK government, grant funding from devolved governments in the UK, and fee income from chargeable services.
