= Revised Statutes of Ontario =

Provincial laws of Ontario, Canada

The Revised Statutes of Ontario (RSO; Canadian French: Lois refondues de l'Ontario, LRO) is the name of several consolidations of public acts in the Canadian province of Ontario, promulgated approximately decennially from 1877 to 1990.

Each revision contains a consolidated version of all non-obsolete statutes of general application, incorporating amendments enacted before the consolidation date. Revisions are defined and published according to acts of the Legislative Assembly of Ontario. The last edition of the RSO was dated 1990 pursuant to the Statutes Revision Act, 1989, consolidating the statutes in force prior to January 1, 1991.

More recently, acts have been consolidated on the e-Laws website, organized by reference to their existing citations in the Statutes of Ontario or Revised Statutes of Ontario.

== Revisions ==
- 1877
- 1887
- 1897
- 1914
- 1927
- 1937
- 1950
- 1960
- 1970
- 1980
- 1990
