= Champart =

Tax in Medieval France

Champart (French pronunciation: [ʃɑ̃paʁ]) was a tax in Medieval France levied by landowners on tenants. Paid as a share of the harvest, the amount due varied between 1/6 and 1/12, and typically 1/8 of the cereal crop.

Regional names for champart included arrage, gerbage, parcière, tasque, and terrage.

Beginning in the early modern period, champart was converted into a cash rent, first in the Île-de-France region.
