= Criminal Law Act 1967 =

Act of the Parliament of the United Kingdom

Criminal Law Act 1967 (Note: Section 15.)
- Act of Parliament
- Parliament of the United Kingdom
- Long title: An Act to amend the law of England and Wales by abolishing the division of crimes into felonies and misdemeanours and to amend and simplify the law in respect of matters arising from or related to that division or the abolition of it; to do away (within or without England and Wales) with certain obsolete crimes together with the torts of maintenance and champerty; and for purposes connected therewith.
- Citation: 1967 c. 58
- Territorial extent: England and Wales (Note: Section 11(1).) (Part I); United Kingdom (Note: The remainder of the act extends to the United Kingdom because the contrary was not specified) (Parts II and III)

Dates
- Royal assent: 21 July 1967
- Commencement: 1 January 1968 (Note: Section 12(1).) (Part I); 21 July 1967 (Note: The remainder of the act came into force on receiving royal assent because no other date was specified.) (Parts II and III)
Other legislation
Amends	Ecclesiastical Licences Act 1533; Tenures Abolition Act 1660; Habeas Corpus Act 1679; Succession to the Crown Act 1707; Treason Act 1708; Union with Ireland Act 1800; Criminal Law Act 1826; Criminal Justice Administration Act 1851; Criminal Procedure Act 1851; Forgery Act 1861; Infant Life (Preservation) Act 1929; Administration of Justice (Miscellaneous Provisions) Act 1933; Sexual Offences Act 1956
Repeals/revokes	Riot Act 1411; Riot Act 1414; Treason Act 1553; Brawling Act 1553; Treason Act 1554; Sale of Horses Act 1555; Sale of Horses Act 1588; Sedition Act 1661; Blasphemy Act 1697; Treason Act 1708; Piracy Act 1717; Fires Prevention Act 1785; Rescue Act 1821; Criminal Law Act 1827; Fires Prevention Act 1838; Accessories and Abettors Act 1861
Amended by	Justices of the Peace Act 1968; Genocide Act 1969; Courts Act 1971; Road Traffic Act 1972; Criminal Justice Act 1972; Powers of Criminal Courts Act 1973; Criminal Attempts Act 1981; Forgery and Counterfeiting Act 1981; Police and Criminal Evidence Act 1984; Public Order Act 1986; Extradition Act 1989; Statute Law (Repeals) Act 1995; Criminal Justice Act 2003; Domestic Violence, Crime and Victims Act 2004; Serious Organised Crime and Police Act 2005; Armed Forces Act 2006

Status: Amended

Text of statute as originally enacted

Text of the Criminal Law Act 1967 as in force today (including any amendments) within the United Kingdom, from legislation.gov.uk.

The Criminal Law Act 1967 (c. 58) is an act of the Parliament of the United Kingdom that made some major changes to English criminal law, as part of wider liberal reforms by the Labour government elected in 1966. Most of it is still in force.

== Territorial scope ==
Although it is an act of the Parliament of the United Kingdom, most of its provisions (except for some minor exceptions) apply only to England and Wales.

Several of the act's provisions were adopted, word for word, for Northern Ireland by the Criminal Law Act (Northern Ireland) 1967 (c. 18) (NI) and the Criminal Justice (Miscellaneous Provisions) Act (Northern Ireland) 1968 (c. 28) (NI). The Republic of Ireland similarly adopted some of its provisions, again word for word, in the Criminal Law Act 1997.

== Structure ==
The act has three parts. Part I abolished the distinction between felony and misdemeanour and makes consequential provisions. Part II abolished a number of obsolete crimes. Part III contains supplementary provisions.

=== Part I – Felony and misdemeanour ===
This Part implements the recommendations made by the Criminal Law Revision Committee in their seventh report.

Section 1 abolished the distinction between felonies and misdemeanours. Originally, all crimes in English law were categorised in a hierarchy of treason, felony, and misdemeanour, each with its own rules of procedure and evidence. (Treason had been brought in line with felony in 1945.) The 1967 act abolished felonies and stated that all former felonies would be tried according to the rules of procedure and evidence that applied in trials and pre-trial hearings for misdemeanours, whether the felony had been committed before or after the act was passed. This also had the effect of abolishing the offences of misprision of felony and compounding a felony (but these offences were replaced with new ones in sections 4 and 5). Although all offences were now misdemeanours, the maximum penalties were not affected.

Section 2 created a new category of arrestable offences, since powers of arrest had depended on whether an offence was a felony or a misdemeanour. Arrestable offences were defined as crimes for which the maximum sentence for an adult was five years or more. The section set out the circumstances in which a citizen or a constable could arrest somebody without a court warrant (police powers were more extensive than a civilian's).

Section 2 was repealed and replaced with section 24 of the Police and Criminal Evidence Act 1984, which was broadly similar to section 2 but also applied to some less serious offences. Section 24 was supplemented by a section 25 which created new powers (for constables only) to arrest those suspected of "non-arrestable offences" in certain circumstances. Sections 24 and 25 were controversially amended by the Serious Organised Crime and Police Act 2005, which abolished the difference between arrestable and non-arrestable offences and substituted one set of police arrest powers for all offences, irrespective of the maximum sentence. Citizens' arrest was confined to indictable offences. This change took effect from 1 January 2006.

Section 3 replaces the common law rules on self-defence in English law, such as the duty to retreat. It simply requires that any force used must be "reasonable in the circumstances". It is still in force today and states:

3. — (1) A person may use such force as is reasonable in the circumstances in the prevention of crime, or in effecting or assisting in the lawful arrest of offenders or suspected offenders or of persons unlawfully at large.

(2) Subsection (1) above shall replace the rules of the common law on the question when force used for a purpose mentioned in the subsection is justified by that purpose.

(Further provision about when force is "reasonable" was made by section 76 of the Criminal Justice and Immigration Act 2008.) The definition of what constitutes a 'crime' was clarified under R v Jones (Margaret), R v Milling et al [2006] UKHL 16, which stated it covered any domestic criminal offence under the law of England and Wales.)

Section 4 created a new offence of assisting anyone who had committed an arrestable offence, "with intent to impede his apprehension or prosecution". This replaced the rules on accessories after the fact in felony cases. The penalty for this offence is linked to the penalty for whatever offence the original offender has committed (between three and ten years' imprisonment).

Section 5(1) created a new offence which replaced misprision and compounding of felony. It stated that a person who has information which might lead to the prosecution of an arrestable offence and who agrees to accept consideration (other than [victim] compensation for the offence) in exchange for not disclosing that information to the authorities is liable to two years' imprisonment.

- When the concept of an "arrestable offence" was abolished, sections 4 and 5(1) were amended so that they now apply to any "relevant offence", which is defined in identical terms to the original 1967 definition of arrestable offence. This significantly reduced the scope of these offences from the wider 1984 definition, which had been steadily extended over the years.
- A person may not be prosecuted for these offences without the permission of the Director of Public Prosecutions or a Crown prosecutor.

Section 5(2) creates the offence commonly known as "wasting police time", committed by giving false information to the police "tending to show that an offence has been committed, or to give rise to apprehension for the safety of any persons or property, or tending to show that he has information material to any police inquiry". The maximum sentence is six months. A person may not be prosecuted for this offence without the permission of the Director of Public Prosecutions or a Crown prosecutor.

Section 5(5) provides that the compounding of an offence other than treason is not an offence otherwise than under section 5 of the Act. This means that:

- The common law offence of compounding treason is preserved.
- The common law offence of compounding a felony, and (if it existed) the common law offence of compounding a misdemeanour, were abolished on 1 January 1968. (In Working Paper No.72, at paragraph 43, the Law Commission suggest that the latter offence might "perhaps" have existed, but offer no explanation.)

Consequential repeals on s.5(5) (s.10(2) and Sch 3, Pt III)

- Section 33 of the Metropolitan Police Courts Act 1839.
- Section 48 of the Pawnbrokers Act 1872.

Section 6 deals with the procedures for arraignment and verdict. In particular, it deals with alternative verdicts (or alternative pleas). When a defendant is found not guilty of the offence he is charged with but is found guilty of a less serious offence (or he wishes to plead not guilty to the more serious offence but guilty to a lesser one), the section allows a verdict or plea of guilty to the lesser offence to be entered even though the offence may not be explicitly charged on the indictment. It also states if a defendant refuses to enter a plea then it defaults to not guilty.

Section 7(5) abolished forfeiture of lands, goods and chattels, and abolished outlawry. (The section is now repealed, but such repeals of repeals do not revive the repealed law.)

=== Part II – Obsolete crimes ===
This part implements recommendations of the Law Commission.

Section 13 abolished the common law offences of champerty and barratry, challenging to fight, eavesdropping, and being "a common scold or a common night walker". It also repealed the offence of praemunire (attempting to appeal to a foreign power, e.g. the pope, on legal matters), which had survived on the statute books since 1392. It preserved the common law offence of embracery (which was later abolished by the Bribery Act 2010). It also repealed the Blasphemy Act 1697.

This section extended only to Great Britain. However identical provision was made for Northern Ireland by section 16 of the Criminal Justice (Miscellaneous Provisions) Act (Northern Ireland) 1968.

==== Repealed enactments ====
Section 13(2) of the act repealed 24 enactments, listed in schedule 4 to the act.

Part I - Acts creating offences to be abolished
Citation	Short title.	Description	Extent of Repeal
3 Edw. 1. c. 25	Statute of Westminster 1275 Champerty	The Statute of Westminster the First.	Chapter 25.
Statutes of uncertain date—20 Edw. 1	Statutum de Conspiratoribus	Statutum de Conspiratoribus.	The whole act.
28 Edw. 1. c. 11	Champerty	(Champerty).	The whole Chapter.
1 Edw. 3. Stat. 2. c. 14.	Maintenance Act 1326	(Maintenance).	The whole Chapter.
1 Ric. 2. c. 4	Penalties for maintenance	(Maintenance).	The whole Chapter.
16 Ric. 2. c. 5	Statute of Praemunire	The Statute of Praemunire	The whole Chapter (this repeal extending to Northern Ireland).
24 Hen. 8. c. 12	Ecclesiastical Appeals Act 1532	The Ecclesiastical Appeals Act 1532.	Section 2.
24 Hen. 8. c. 12	Ecclesiastical Appeals Act 1532	The Ecclesiastical Appeals Act 1532.	Section 4, so far as unrepealed.
25 Hen. 8. c. 19	Submission of the Clergy Act 1533	The Submission of the Clergy Act 1533.	Section 5.
25 Hen. 8. c. 20	Appointment of Bishops Act 1533	The Appointment of Bishops Act 1533.	Section 6.
25 Hen. 8. c. 21	Ecclesiastical Licences Act 1533	The Ecclesiastical Licences Act 1533.	Section 16.
26 Hen. 8. c. 14	Suffragan Bishops Act 1534	The Suffragan Bishops Act 1534.	Section 4, from " And that no such suffragan " onwards.
28 Hen. 8. c. 16	Ecclesiastical Licences Act 1536	The Ecclesiastical Licences Act 1536.	Section 1, from " and shall never " onwards.
32 Hen. 8. c. 9	Maintenance and Embracery Act 1540	The Maintenance and Embracery Act 1540.	The whole act.
1 Mary Sess. 2. c. 3	Brawling Act 1553	The Brawling Act 1553.	The whole act.
21 Jas. 1. c. 3.	Statute of Monopolies	The Statute of Monopolies.	Section 4, from " and if any person or persons shall after notice given " onwards.
12 Chas. 2. c. 24.	Tenures Abolition Act 1660	The Tenures Abolition Act 1660.	Section 12, from " and if any person or persons shall after notice given " onwards.
13 Chas. 2. Stat. 1. c. 1.	Sedition Act 1661	The Sedition Act 1661.	The whole act, so far as unrepealed.
9 Will. 3. c. 35.	Blasphemy Act 1697	The Blasphemy Act 1697.	The whole act.
6 Anne c. 41.	Succession to the Crown Act 1707	The Succession to the Crown Act 1707.	The preamble and sections 1, 2 and 3.
19 Geo. 2. c. 21.	Profane Oaths Act 1745	The Profane Oaths Act 1745.	The whole act.
12 Geo. 3. c. 11.	Royal Marriages Act 1772	The Royal Marriages Act 1772.	Section 3 (this repeal extending to Northern Ireland).
25 Geo. 3. c. 77.	Fires Prevention Act 1785	The Fires Prevention Act 1785.	The whole act, so far as unrepealed.
39 Geo. 3. c. 79.	Unlawful Societies Act 1799	The Unlawful Societies Act 1799.	The whole act, so far as unrepealed.
57 Geo. 3. c. 19.	Seditious Meetings Act 1817	The Seditious Meetings Act 1817.	Sections 25 to 28.
57 Geo. 3. c. 19.	Seditious Meetings Act 1817	The Seditious Meetings Act 1817.	In section 29, the words " any meeting of any society or club hereby declared to be an unlawful combination and confederacy or ".
57 Geo. 3. c. 19.	Seditious Meetings Act 1817	The Seditious Meetings Act 1817.	Sections 30 and 31.
57 Geo. 3. c. 19.	Seditious Meetings Act 1817	The Seditious Meetings Act 1817.	Sections 34 to 38.
57 Geo. 3. c. 19.	Seditious Meetings Act 1817	The Seditious Meetings Act 1817.	The Schedule.

- The Profane Oaths Act 1745
- The Riot Act 1715
- The Blasphemy Act 1697
- The Sedition Act 1661

=== Short title, commencement and extent ===
Section 11(1) of the act provided that part I of the act would not extend to Scotland or Northern Ireland unless expressly provided.

Section 12(1) of the act provided that part I of the act, except in so far as it enlarges the powers of the Parliament of Northern Ireland, would come into force on 1 January 1968. The rest of the act came into power on 21 July 1967. (Note: Section 4 of the Interpretation Act 1978.)

Section 15 of the act provided that the act may be cited as the "Criminal Law Act 1967".

== See also ==
- Criminal Law Act

== Bibliography ==
- "Criminal Law Act 1967". Current Law Statutes Annotated 1967. Chapter 58.
- "The Criminal Law Act 1967". Halsbury's Statutes of England. Second Edition. Volume 47: Continuation Volume 1967. Butterworth & Co (Publishers) Ltd. London. 1968. pp 336, 977 & 1785.
- Paul Davies, "The Criminal Law Act 1967" in "Current Survey" (1968) 8 British Journal of Criminology 88
- J C Wood, "Notes on the Criminal Law Act, 1967" (1967) 40 The Police Journal 533
- P J Richardson (ed). Archbold Criminal Pleading, Evidence and Practice 1996. Sweet & Maxwell. vol 2. pp 49, 53, 85 to 87, 104, 105, 125, 128, 129, 148, 164, 166 to 168, 184, 188, 190, 192 to 194, 196, 200 to 202, 205, 206, 210, 213, 216, 229, 249, 268 to 270, 288, 289, 291, 292, 298, 305, 321, 331, 351, 382, 421, 422, 426, 437, 531, 568 to 570, 574, 582, 620, 693, 700, 715, 717, 847, 860, 863, 864, 905, 1119, 1120, 1123, 1128, 1129, 1191, 1213, 1214, 1223, 1225, 1232, 1234, 1264, 1453, 1482, 1552, 1584, 1637, 1737, 1740, 1744, 1750 & 1797.
- Stewart. A Modern View of the Criminal Law. Pergamon Press. 1969. pp 23, 38, 41, 81, 87, 89, 91 & 238.
- Criminal Law Revision Committee, Seventh Report: Felonies and Misdemeanours (Cmnd 2659)
- The Law Commission, Proposals to Abolish Certain Ancient Criminal Offences (Law Com 3) HTML
- The Law Commission, Proposals for Reform of the Law relating to Maintenance and Champerty (Law Com 7) HTML
