= Alternative media in South Africa =

Media sector in South Africa

South Africa has a long history of alternative media. During the 1980s there was a host of community and grassroots newspapers that supplied content that ran counter to the prevailing attitudes of the times. In addition, a thriving small press and underground press carried voices that would not have been heard in the mainstream, corporate media. Pirate radio projects operated by Caset were the forerunners of the country's community radio and small pamphlets and samizdat were included in the mix.

The advocacy journalism of early activist titles was in stark contrast to the complacency of the country's large media houses. While many of the counterculture titles associated with the apartheid struggle no longer exist, there has been a resurgence of alternative media and the small press after a period of decline, notable because large corporates absorbed many of the so-called "struggle" journalists and mopped up small publishing houses. These media projects involve multi-media as well as electronic journalism.

However, there are some who criticise what they call a lack of real alternative media in South Africa.

== Print media ==
=== 1940s ===
- Varsity (Cape Town) (1942–)

=== 1980s ===
- Akal
- Die Suid-Afrikaan (1983–1996)
- Grassroots (1980–1990)
- Izwe
- Kagenna (1989–1993)
- New Era
- New Nation (1980–1997)
- South (1987–1994)
- Weekly Mail (1985–1993)
- Vrye Weekblad (1988–1994)
- Vula

=== 1990s ===
- Chimurenga
- Workers World Media Productions (1997-to date)

=== 2000 ===
Since the end of Apartheid, there has been a dearth of alternative media in South Africa as most of it got incorporated into mainstream corporate media as well as government and political party organising. Some of South Africa's largest social movements and other activist organisations have an online presence of alternative blogs and activist websites. According to the social movements, the importance of these alternative media sites are that they provide a way for 'poor people to speak for themselves'. These include:

- Abahlali baseMjondolo, the shackdwellers movement has the following website: www.abahlali.org
- The Western Cape Anti-Eviction Campaign in Cape Town
- The Zabalaza Anarchist Communist Front produces Zabalaza: A Journal of Southern African Revolutionary Anarchism as well as a newssheet called Zabalaza News.
- Khayelitsha Struggles
- Mandela Park Backyarders
- South African Civil Society Information Service
- Amandla! Magazine
- Skawara News

== Radio ==
- Caset
- Bush Radio
- Tuks FM
- UJ FM
- Metro FM
- Ukhozi FM
- Umhlobo Wenene FM

== Television and video ==
- CVET
- MediaWorks Publishing
- barefootWORKSHOPS
- [CTV capetowntv.org]

== Access ==
- CAP

== Internet ==
- South Africa Today

== See also ==
- Alternative media
- Alternative culture
