= Blasphemy law =

Law prohibiting blasphemy

Blasphemy laws and penalties by jurisdiction: Death sentences Prison sentences Fines, other restrictions, or unknown penalty Blasphemy is a common law offence Blasphemy laws repealed No blasphemy laws

A blasphemy law is a law prohibiting blasphemy, which is the act of insulting or showing contempt or lack of reverence to a deity, or sacred objects, or toward something considered sacred or inviolable. According to Pew Research Center, about a quarter of the world's countries and territories (26%) had anti-blasphemy laws or policies as of 2014.

In some states, blasphemy laws are used to protect the religious beliefs of a majority, while in other countries, they serve to offer protection of the religious beliefs of minorities.

In addition to prohibitions against blasphemy or blasphemous libel, blasphemy laws include all laws which give redress to those insulted on account of their religion. These blasphemy laws may forbid: the vilification of religion and religious groups, defamation of religion and its practitioners, denigration of religion and its followers, offending religious feelings, or the contempt of religion. Some blasphemy laws, such as those formerly existing in Denmark, do not criminalize "speech that expresses critique," but rather, "sanctions speech that insults."

Human rights experts argue for laws which adequately distinguish between protection of individuals' freedoms and laws which over-broadly restrict freedom of speech. Article 20 of the International Covenant on Civil and Political Rights obliges countries to adopt legislative measures against "any advocacy of national racial or religious hatred that constitutes incitement to discrimination, hostility or violence." However, they also note that such protections must be carefully circumscribed, and do not support prohibition of blasphemy per se.

== By country ==
Humanists International publishes the annual Freedom of Thought Report, which compiles country-by-country material on the treatment of non-religious people and related freedoms of expression and belief.

=== Christian-majority countries ===
In a number of states with a majority-Christian or formerly majority-Christian population, blasphemy laws may criminalize abusive or scurrilous speech about Christianity, and oftentimes, other religions and their adherents, as such offenses "have the tendency to lead to a breach of peace".

==== Australia ====
Emerging as a British colony in the 1780s, Australia received English common law, including the Blasphemy Act 1697. The first colonial laws were the Blasphemous and Seditious Libels Act 1827 for New South Wales (repealed in 1898), and legislation that governor Arthur Phillip enacted in Van Diemen's Land in the same year that regulated printing and publishing and prohibited 'blasphemous and seditious libels' as part of a law to maintain public order.

The last attempted prosecution for blasphemy by the Crown occurred in the State of Victoria in 1919.

Australia abolished and repealed all blasphemy laws at the federal level with the Australia Criminal Code Act 1995, but blasphemy laws remain as common law offences in some states and territories. Queensland, Tasmania, and Western Australia have abolished their blasphemy laws along with the common law offences, while blasphemy or blasphemous libel remain common law offences in the other jurisdictions, including New South Wales (section 49 of the Defamation Act 1974 (NSW)), South Australia, Victoria, the Australian Capital Territory and the Northern Territory.

==== Austria ====
In Austria, Section 188 of the criminal code relates to acts against "religious peace" and the degradation of religious teachings. It prohibits blasphemy with a penalty of a fine or up to six months in prison.

Austria was the birthplace of the famous European Court of Human Rights case E.S. v. Austria (2018) on blasphemy, which narrowly upheld Austria's blasphemy law by suggesting the state had a legitimate aim in maintaining it.

==== Brazil ====
Art. 208 of the penal code states that "publicly vilifying an act or object of religious worship" is a crime punishable with one month to one year of prison, or fine.

==== Canada ====
Blasphemous libel was a crime in Canada under section 296 of the Criminal Code R.S.C., 1985, c. C-46. Subsection (1) read:

"Every one who publishes a blasphemous libel is guilty of an indictable offence and liable to imprisonment for a term not exceeding two years".

Subsection (3) read:

"No person shall be convicted of an offence under this section for expressing in good faith and in decent language, or attempting to establish by argument used in good faith and conveyed in decent language, an opinion on a religious subject".

Over the summer of 2016, a petition to Parliament asking that the blasphemous libel law be repealed was circulated by several Canadian humanist groups. The petition was presented to the Government in December 2016. It responded in January 2017, stating that "blasphemous libel, along with numerous other provisions of the Criminal Code, are presently under review by the Minister [of Justice] and her officials". On 6 June 2017, Justice Minister Jody Wilson-Raybould introduced Bill C-51 in the House of Commons, an Act to Amend the Criminal Code including repeal of section 296 of the Criminal Code relating to blasphemous libel and various other provisions of the Criminal Code which have been ruled or may be unconstitutional. The Bill passed both the House of Commons and the Senate on 11 December 2018. On 13 December 2018, the Governor General formally granted Royal Assent, making the repeal official.

==== Cyprus ====
Articles 141 and 142 of the Cyprus Criminal Code criminalise "wounding religious feelings" and publishing material that insults or vilifies a religion.

==== Denmark ====
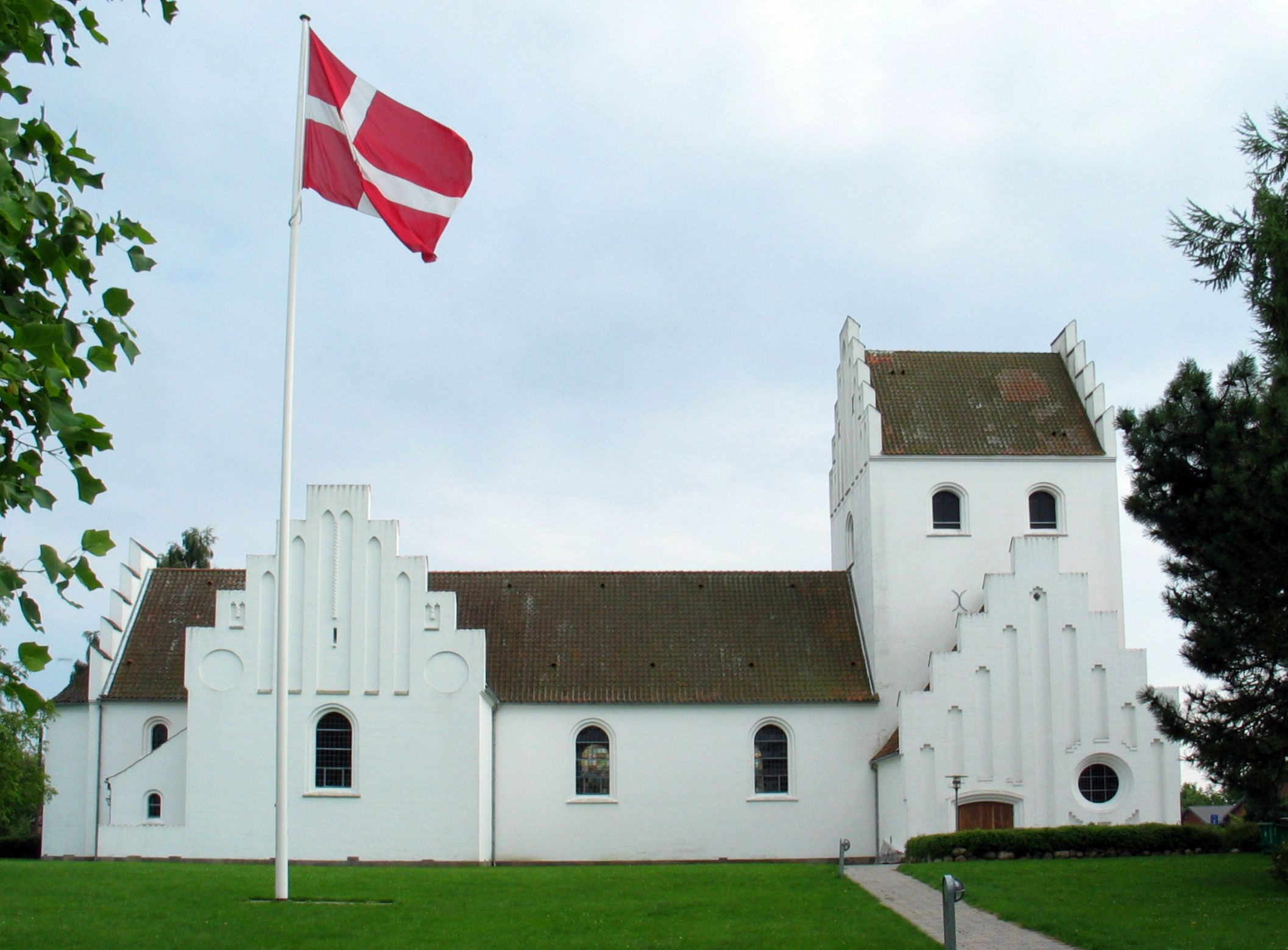
A Church of Denmark parish church in Holte, with the Dannebrog flying in its churchyard

In Denmark, Paragraph 140 of the penal code was about blasphemy. Since 1866, this law has only led to two convictions, in 1938 and in 1946. A further charge was brought to court in 1971, but led to acquittal. In 2017, a man was charged with blasphemy for posting a video of himself burning the Quran on social media under the slogan Yes to freedom – no to Islam. In 2012, a survey indicated that 66% of Denmark's population still supported the blasphemy law, which made it illegal to "mock legal religions and faiths in Denmark". Before 2017, abolition of the blasphemy clause was proposed several times by members of the parliament, but failed to win a majority vote. The law was repealed on 2 June 2017 several days before the 2017 charge was due to come to trial. While public insults of a religion are no longer forbidden, speech and actions threatening or demeaning certain groups of people because of their religious beliefs continued to be punishable pursuant to §266(b) of the penal code.

Denmark reinstated blasphemy laws in 2023. It bans improper treatment of a significant religious writing in public or with intent to spread such act publicly.

==== El Salvador ====
El Salvador is a mostly Catholic country, where freedom of religion is protected under the constitution, with the Catholic Church receiving some privileges. El Salvador's penal code bans insulting religion and is punishable from 1–3 years in prison. People convicted of "insulting religion" are given a penalty of 6 months to 8 years in prison.

==== Finland ====
In Finland, Section 10 of Chapter 17 of the Criminal Code prohibits blasphemy with a penalty of a fine or up to six months in prison. The section is titled "Breach of the sanctity of religion," and the law explicitly prohibits "publicly blaspheming against God" as well as defaming what is held sacred by a religious community. Unsuccessful attempts have been made to remove the particular reference to the Christian God in 1914, 1917, 1965, 1970, and most recently in 1998, when the Finnish Parliament unexpectedly voted to retain it.

This prohibition has given rise to a number of highly publicized cases in recent Finnish history. The author Hannu Salama was convicted of blasphemy for his 1964 novel Juhannustanssit. In 1969, artist Harro Koskinen was prosecuted and fined for works including his painting Pig Messiah, a crucified pig; the works were later displayed in art galleries. Writer and politician Jussi Halla-aho, who later became a Member of the Parliament of Finland, was fined for insinuating connections between pedophilia and Islam in a 2008 blog text.

==== France ====
The definition of blasphemy was introduced into French law in the 13th century (after great debate among the French Moralists), based on the definition given by St. Thomas Aquinas: a sin of language, "a failure to declare one's faith", thus representing an attack on the purity of religion. This justified punishment by law, which became extreme during the reign of Louis IX. Later canonized by the Catholic church as Saint Louis, he became highly committed to his fight against heretics, Jews and Muslims, and set the punishment for blasphemy to mutilation of the tongue and lips. Louis IX passed this law against blasphemy in 1254 after his return home from the Seventh Crusade.

At the beginning of the French Revolution, articles 10 and 11 of the 1789 Declaration of the Rights of Man and of the Citizen (Déclaration des Droits de l'Homme et du Citoyen) motivated the 1791 elimination of the notion of blasphemy from French law, but it continued to prohibit the use of abusive language or disturbance of the peace. Sacrilege actions towards cultural objects became a crime in 1825 during an extreme phase of the Bourbon Restoration (1814), to be revoked under the less conservative Louis Philippe in 1830. "Religious insult" ("outrage à la morale religieuse ") was introduced by the Act of 17 May 1819, and definitively removed from French law by the Act of 29 July 1881 which instituted freedom of the press. As of 2018, and since the 1972 ratification of the European Convention of Human Rights, French law proscribed hate or violence against, and slander or libel against, people due to their membership of a religious group, nationality, ethnic group, race, sexual orientation or handicap (Art.23, 24, 32). The Act of 1881 protects individuals and groups of individuals against defamation or insult ("injure " and "outrage " for foreign ambassadors), but not the divinities ((in French) like Jesus Christ) and their doctrines as for blasphemy.

The Alsace-Moselle region was a specific exception, as it was annexed to Germany from 1871 to 1918 and therefore not part of France when the "religious insult" law was repealed. The German penal code replaced the pre-1871 French law between 1871 and 1918, and the local law in Alsace-Moselle retained some elements of both the German penal code and pre-1871 French law when the regions reverted to France in 1919, like the religious legislation and the articles 166 and 167. This long included a ban of "blasphemy" (as translated from the German word lästerung) against Christianity and Judaism, without mention of Islam which at the time had very few followers in Alsace. Since the dispositions of article 166 were not among those finally transposed officially in French law since the Act of 1 June 1924, whose article 1 and 1 s) introduced as well in Alsace-Moselle the generally referred to Act of 29 July 1881, then translated into French in 2013 by the decrees n•2013-395 and particularly n•2013-776, they received no application since then, as the appeal court of Colmar refused to apply this article in 1954, contrary to article 167 (obstacle to the exercise of worship). The minister of justice replied to some senators that article 166 was already implicitly repealed because contrary to the French fundamental law. Its validity could have also been questioned by a court since 1975 and by a prioritary question of constitutionality since 2008. In response to the Charlie Hebdo attack and with the full support of the Alsatian churches, an October 2016 vote of the French parliament symbolically repealed this long-dormant Alsace-Moselle blasphemy law which was long implicitly unenforceable.

==== Germany ====
In Germany, religious defamation is covered by Article 166 of the Strafgesetzbuch, the German criminal law. If a deed is capable of disturbing the public peace, defamation is actionable. The article reads as follows:

§ 166 Defamation of religious denominations, religious societies and World view associations
(1) Whoever publicly or by dissemination of writings (§ 11 par. 3) defames, in a manner suitable to disturb the public peace, the substance of the religious or world view conviction of others, shall be fined or imprisoned for up to three years.
(2) Whoever publicly or by dissemination of writings (§ 11 par. 3) defames, in a manner suitable to disturb the public peace, a church existing in Germany or other religious society or world view association, or their institutions or customs, shall be punished likewise.

In 2006, the application of this article received much media attention when a Manfred van H. (also known as "Mahavo") was prosecuted for defamation for distributing rolls of toilet paper with the words "Koran, the Holy Koran" stamped on them. The defendant claimed he wanted to protest the murder of Dutch filmmaker Theo van Gogh in 2004 and the London bombings of 2005. Beyond the sentence he also received death threats from Islamists and needed a police bodyguard.

==== Greece ====
Until 2019, articles 198, 199, and 201 of the Greek Penal Code created offenses which involved blasphemy. Article 198 "Malicious Blasphemy" provided:

1. One who...blasphemes God shall be punished by imprisonment for not more than two years.

2. [O]ne who...manifests a lack of respect for the divinity shall be punished by imprisonment for not more than three months.

Article 199 "Blasphemy Concerning Religions" restated most of Article 198, and criminalized blasphemy against the Greek Orthodox Church.

Article 201 criminalized acts committed "blasphemously and improperly toward a grave".

Greece had not used its laws about blasphemy to protect any religion other than the Greek Orthodox Church, which is the state church of Greece. In December 2003, Greece prosecuted for blasphemy Gerhard Haderer, an Austrian, along with his Greek publisher and four booksellers. Haderer is the author of an illustrated, humorous book entitled The Life of Jesus. The prosecutor contended that the book's depiction of Jesus as a hippie was blasphemous. On 13 April 2005, the Court of Appeal of Athens, reversed the judgment of the Court of First Instance, and acquitted Haderer.

Greece complemented its laws against blasphemy with laws against "religious insult". The laws forbade the creation, display or trade in work that "insults public sentiment" or that "offends people's religious sentiments".

The new Criminal Code, which came into force in July 2019, under the Syriza government, removed articles 198 and 199, thus ending its ban on blasphemy.

The conservative New Democracy government initially announced in November its intention to reintroduce the criminalization of blasphemy, with punishment up to two years in jail but backtracked on the announcement following a domestic and international outcry.

==== Iceland ====
The Icelandic blasphemy law was repealed on 2 July 2015, after a strong push by the Icelandic Pirate Party and a number of associations including Icelandic Ethical Humanist Association (Siðmennt), the bishop of Iceland, the Icelandic priesthood, the Association of Publishers, PEN Iceland, IMMI (The International Modern Media Institute) an Icelandic-based international organization of information and freedom of expression, and an atheist group called Vantrú. Formerly, blasphemy was forbidden with a fine or prison sentence up to three months (Article 125 of the General Penal Code of Iceland, enacted on 12 February 1940). The constitution also mentions the state religion and religion in general.

==== Ireland ====
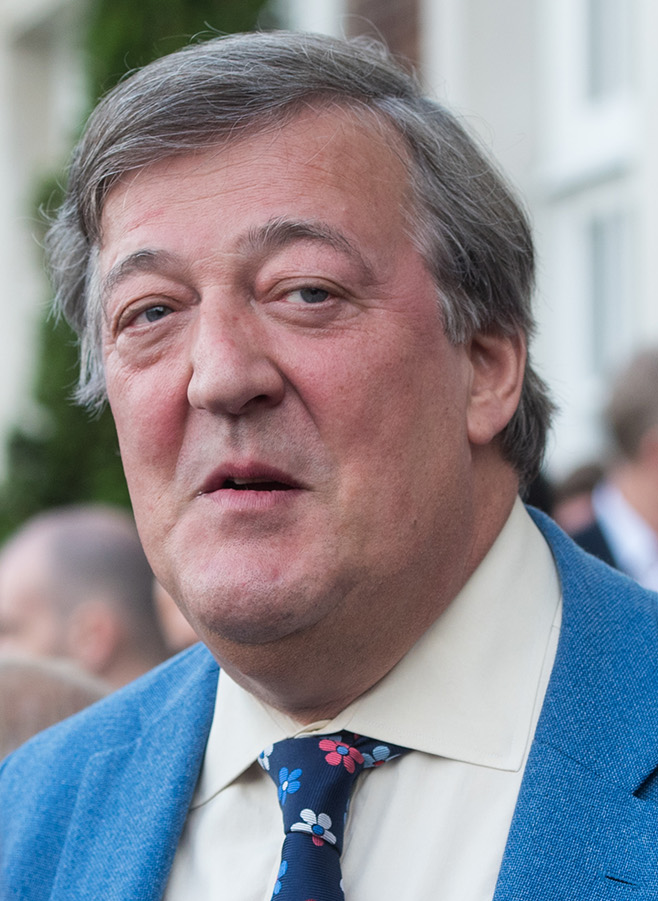
Stephen Fry in June 2016

In Ireland, blasphemy against any form of religion was prohibited by the 2009 Defamation Act until its repeal on 17 January 2020. Blasphemy against Christianity was prohibited by the constitution and carried a maximum fine of €25,000; however, the offence of blasphemous libel, last prosecuted in 1855 in connection to an alleged Bible-burning, was ruled in 1999 to be incompatible with the Constitution's guarantee of religious equality. A controversial law was passed on 9 July 2009 and went into effect on 1 January 2010. The law prohibited publishing or uttering "matter that is grossly abusive or insulting in relation to matters held sacred by any religion, thereby causing outrage among a substantial number of the adherents of that religion".

The Irish Constitutional Convention in 2013 recommended, and the Government endorsed, the repeal of the constitutional prohibition on blasphemy (Article 40.6.1.i.), but the Taoiseach indicated to postpone the issue. Calls for repeal resurged after the January 2015 Charlie Hebdo shooting.

The law had not been invoked until in February 2015 English comedian Stephen Fry, when asked during an RTÉ programme what he might say to God at the gates of heaven, responded, without specifying any religion,

I'd say: "Bone cancer in children, what's that about? How dare you? How dare you create a world in which there is such misery that is not our fault? It's not right. It's utterly, utterly evil. Why should I respect a capricious, mean-minded, stupid god who creates a world which is so full of injustice and pain?" That's what I'd say ... the god who created this universe, if it was created by a god, is quite clearly a maniac, an utter maniac, totally selfish ...

An allegation of blasphemy was made to police at the time, and in 2017 police contacted Fry to inform him that the incident was being investigated. News of the investigation caused a big stir, but a few days later it was reported that the police, the Garda Síochána, had dropped the case as there was no injured party. The Garda Síochána could not find enough people outraged over the actor's anti-God remarks. One individual complaint alone cannot result in a prosecution under the legislation and only one viewer made a formal complaint against Fry's comments. The complainant said that he was not personally offended by the programme but simply believed that the comments made by Fry on RTÉ were criminal blasphemy and that he was doing his civic duty by reporting a crime.

In June 2018, the Irish government agreed to a referendum to remove the offense of blasphemy from the Constitution. The referendum, which took place on 26 October 2018, abolished the constitutional ban on blasphemy by a margin of 64.85% to 35.15%. In January 2020, Minister of Justice and Equality Charles Flanagan signed an order commencing an amendment to the law. Until then, blasphemy had been prohibited by sections 36 and 37 of the Defamation Act 2009, for which offenders could face a fine of up to €25,000.

In 2021, the Irish government proposed legislation criminalizing hate speech. Previously, Irish politicians Mattie McGrath and Keith Redmond stated that hate speech legislation was "secular blasphemy law" in their unsuccessful attempts to oppose it.

==== Italy ====
In Italy, under article 724 of the Penal Code, blasphemy in public is considered an "administrative offense" and punished with a fine ranging from €51 to €309. First introduced in 1930 under Mussolini, blasphemy was decriminalized as per art.57, d.lgs. n.507 of 30 December 1999. Following a ruling of the Corte Costituzionale in sentence n.440 of 18 October 1995, the law punishes only blasphemy against the "Deity". Article 404 of the penal code also punishes public offenses to religion, and has been invoked against artists using religious imagery in satirical art.

At the end of July 2019, public blasphemy was also made illegal on the local level in the Italian town of Saonara, punishing alleged blasphemers with a fine of €400.

==== Malta ====
Instead of a law against blasphemy, Malta had laws against the vilification of religion, and against immorality. Enacted in 1933, Article 163 of Malta's Criminal Code prohibited "vilification of the Roman Catholic Apostolic Religion", which is Malta's state religion. Vilification of Malta's religion made the vilifier liable to imprisonment for a term from one to six months. By Article 164, vilification of any cult "tolerated by law" made the vilifier liable to imprisonment for a term from one to three months. Article 338(bb) imposes liability upon anyone who, "even though in a state of intoxication, publicly utters any obscene or indecent words, or makes obscene acts or gestures, or in any other manner not otherwise provided for in this Code, offends against public morality, propriety or decency". Article 342 provides:

In respect of the contravention under article 338(bb), where the act consists in uttering blasphemous words or expressions, the minimum punishment to be awarded shall in no case be less than a fine (amenda) of eleven euro and sixty-five cents (11.65) and the maximum punishment may be imprisonment for a term of three months ...

In 2008, criminal procedures were initiated against 162 people for blaspheming in public.

In July 2016, the parliament of Malta repealed articles 163 and 164 of the criminal code.

==== Montenegro ====
Article 370 of the Montenegro Criminal Code prohibits inciting violence or hatred towards a religious group through mockery of religious symbols, with a penalty of six months to five years in prison. Although the law only applies to incitement of hatred, it is broad enough to potentially prohibit blasphemy by including the mockery of religious symbols as a factor.

==== Netherlands ====
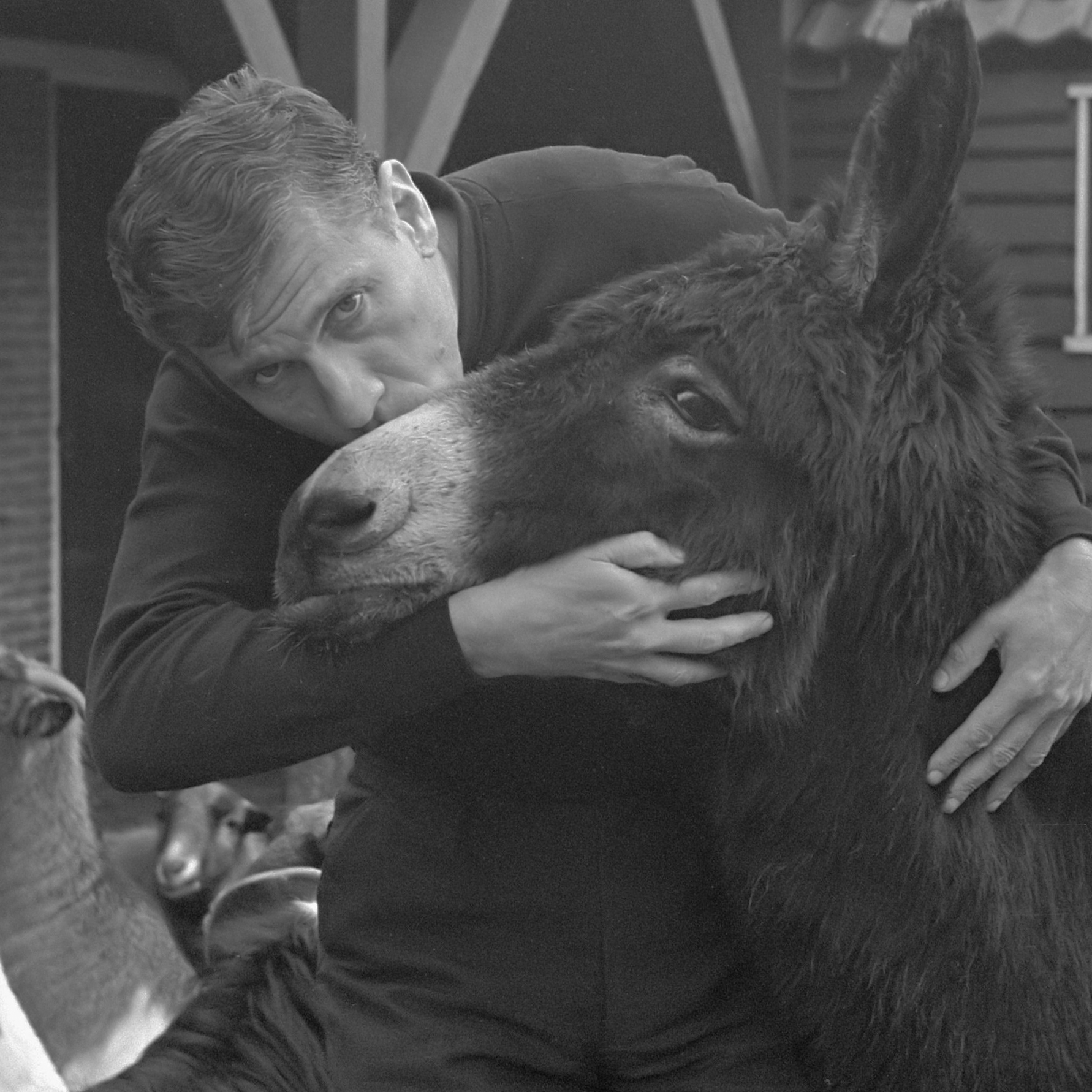
Gerard Reve kisses a donkey (1969). Found guilty of 'blasphemy' in 1966 for describing a sex scene with God-turned-donkey in his novel Nader tot U, he successfully appealed in 1968.

With the introduction of the Dutch Criminal Code of 1881, in force since 1886, the Netherlands obtained its first law against blasphemy. The Minister of Justice argued that, although God would be perfectly capable of protecting his own rights, the Dutch legislator had to 'protect the rights of society'.

In 1932, a bill was proposed to tighten the 1886 law. Parliament was divided between confessional and non-confessional parties, but also between different confessional parties on the question whether the purpose of the bill was protecting God or religion, or religious people. The bill passed on 1 June 1932 with 49 against 44 votes in the House, 28 against 18 votes in the Senate, and was adopted on 4 November 1932.

Article 147 punished (by up to three months in jail or a fine of the second category (i.e. up to €3,800)) anyone who publicly, orally or in writing or depiction, offends religious feelings by scornful blasphemy. Furthermore, article 429bis prohibited displaying blasphemous material at places visible from the public road. The law came into being in the 1930s after the Communist Party called for Christmas to be dropped from the list of state holidays. The last successful conviction under Article 147 took place in the early 1960s when a student newspaper was fined 100 guilders for satirizing the New Testament. The law against blasphemy complements laws against racial discrimination and incitement to violence.

In 1966, the Public Prosecution Service prosecuted writer Gerard Reve under Article 147. In his novel Nader tot U ("Nearer to Thee"), Reve describes the narrator's sexual intercourse with God, who is incarnated in a donkey. The court of first instance convicted Reve, but he appealed. In April 1968, an appeals court quashed the conviction.

In November 2008, Justice Minister Ernst Hirsch Ballin expressed the country's coalition government's intent to repeal Article 147. He said the government would strengthen the legislation against discrimination to prohibit any insult to any group of people. In May 2009, the government decided to leave the law as it is. The decision followed a high court ruling in which a man who had put up a poster that read "stop the tumour that is Islam" was found not guilty of insulting a group of people on the grounds of their religion. The decision not to abolish the ban on blasphemy was partly motivated to ensure the support of the conservative Reformed Christian SGP for the minority government in the senate. After a general election in 2012, a new coalition government was formed and a majority of parliament pledged to support a proposal to repeal the blasphemy law.

In November 2012, parliament decided to overturn the blasphemy laws. It would pass with support from the VVD, but the SGP were strongly opposed to the measure. According to the SGP, the decision to lift the ban on blasphemy is a "painful loss of a moral anchor and a symptom of a spiritual crisis". On 1 February 2014, the law on blasphemy was abolished.

==== New Zealand ====
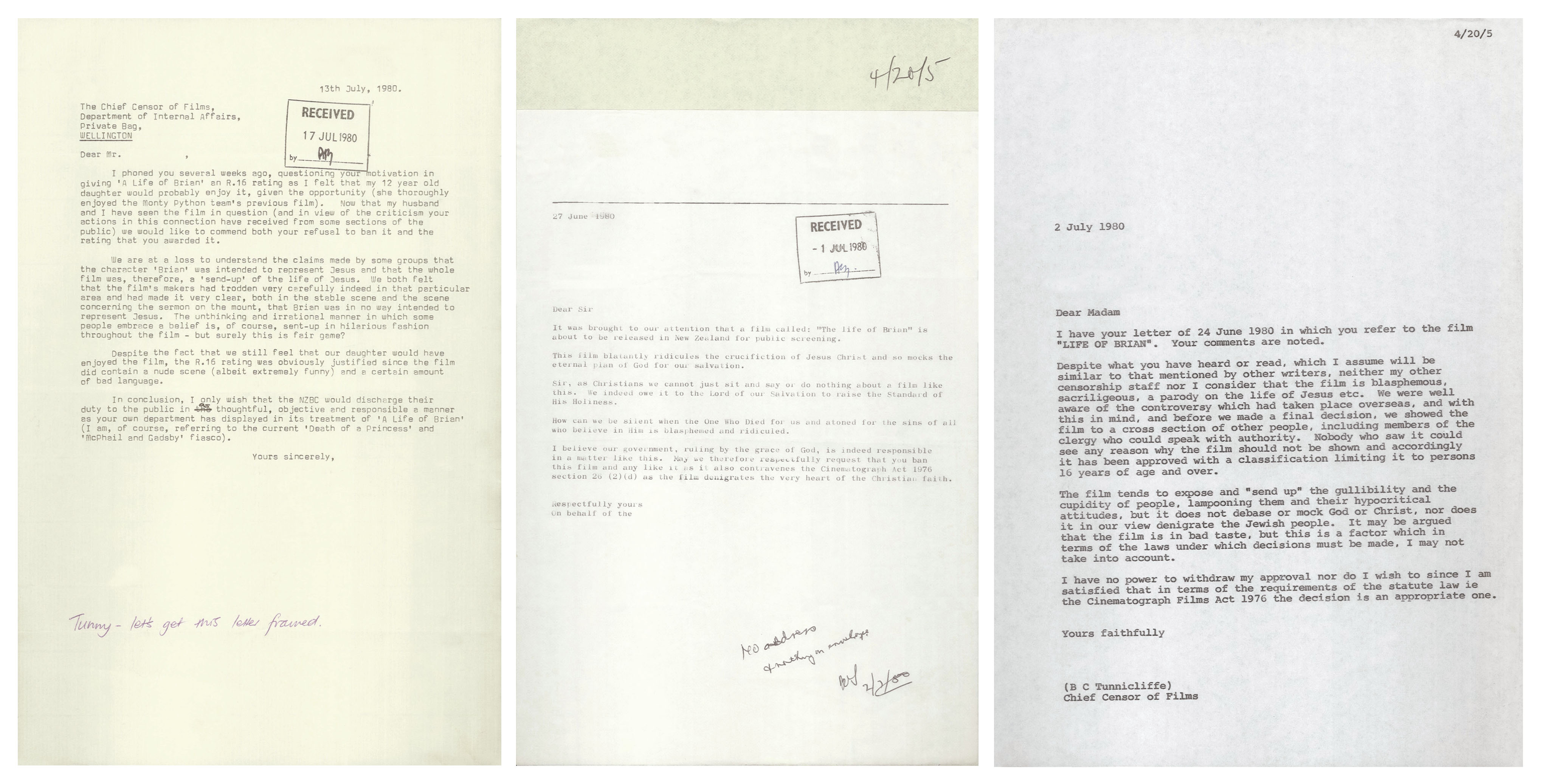
Correspondence on whether Monty Python's Life of Brian (1979) should be banned in New Zealand for blasphemy

In New Zealand, Section 123 of the Crimes Act 1961 allowed for imprisonment of up to one year for anyone who published any "blasphemous libel". Cases were only prosecuted at the discretion of the New Zealand Attorney-General, who usually cited overriding free speech objections so as not to pursue such a case. The only prosecution for blasphemous libel in New Zealand was the case of John Glover, publisher of the newspaper The Maoriland Worker, in 1922. Glover was acquitted.

The British comedy film Monty Python's Life of Brian (1979) about a fictional Jewish man living at the same time and neighbourhood as Jesus Christ, generated significant international controversy and was banned in several countries including Ireland and Norway. Hundreds of letters were sent to the Film Censor's Office to have the film banned in New Zealand as well on the grounds of it being 'blasphemous' against the Christian faith, but the Chief Censor of Films responded by stating that they had found no evidence of blasphemy or sacrilegiousness in the film.

In March 2018, Justice Minister Andrew Little (Labour Party) introduced a Crimes Amendment Bill that included repeal of Section 123, the crime of blasphemous libel. The bill passed the third reading on 5 March 2019 with the unanimous support of parliament, received the royal assent on 11 March and came into force on 12 March 2019. An earlier Labour repeal attempt in 2017 was blocked by the then governing National Party.

==== Norway ====
In 2009, the Norwegian Parliament voted to remove the dormant law against blasphemy (§ 142 in the penal code). It was, however, removed from the penal code of 2005, which did not come into force until October 2015. Therefore, blasphemy was illegal until 2015 under the old Penal Code of 1902.

The famous writer and social activist Arnulf Øverland was the last to be tried by this law, in 1933, after giving a speech named "Kristendommen – den tiende landeplage" ("Christianity – the tenth plague"), but was acquitted. The last person sentenced for blasphemy in Norway was Arnfred Olsen in 1912, and he had to pay a fine of 10 Norwegian krone.

The British comedy film Monty Python's Life of Brian (1979) was briefly banned in Norway by the authorities in early 1980, because it 'was believed to commit the crime of blasphemy by violating people's religious feelings'. However, the ban was lifted in October 1980 after a group of theologians who had seen the film produced a statement saying that there was no good reason for a total ban. Life of Brian was allowed on the big screen, provided with a poster at the beginning which stated that Brian was not Jesus. It was then marketed in Sweden as "The film so funny that it was banned in Norway".

==== Philippines ====
"Crimes against religious worship" are stated under section four of the Revised Penal Code of the Philippines. Under article 132 and 133, respectively, "interruption of religious worship" and "offending the religious feelings" are punishable by law. "Interruption of religious worship" is defined as "preventing or disturbing the ceremonies or manifestations of any religion" and "offending the religious feelings" is defined as "performing acts notoriously offensive to the feelings of the faithful" in a place devoted to religious worship or during the celebration of any religious ceremony.

Penalties range from imprisonment of four months and a day to six months; crimes that involve violence or threats can carry a penalty of up to six years in jail.

==== Poland ====
While Poland's penal code makes no reference to any sort of blasphemy law, it states that "Whoever offends religious feelings of other people by publicly insulting an object of religious cult or a place for public holding of religious ceremonies, is subject to a fine, restriction of liberty or loss of liberty for up to 2 years". The article has been used by pro-Church politicians and activists on numerous occasions, whenever they felt their religious feelings had been offended in any way. Opponents of the article maintain that due to its vagueness it is abused by seriously limiting the freedom of speech and effectively preventing any kind of debate on Church's sexual crimes and the Church's widespread influence on social, sexual and political life of Poland.

A notable conviction on the basis of this law was that of the pop singer Dorota "Doda" Rabczewska who in 2012 was fined for the amount of 5,000 złotych for saying in an interview that the Bible was written by people 'drunk on wine and smoking some kind of herbs'. Her complaint was rejected by the Constitutional Tribunal, which confirmed that the law did not violate the Constitution. In March 2019, a notable Polish journalist Jerzy Urban was fined 120,000 złotych (around US$30,000) and additional 28,000 PLN of court costs for publishing an image of christ astonished in his newspaper "NIE".

In 2022 United Poland part of the ruling government called for tougher blasphemy laws in Poland, such as three-year jail terms for insulting church or interrupting mass.

In October 2022, they submitted a citizens' legislative initiative for the tougher blasphemy laws with close to 400,000 signatures to parliament.

==== Romania ====
Romania never had blasphemy laws active. According to Romanian law, "cults, religious associations and religious groups ... must not infringe upon ... fundamental human rights and liberties", which, according to the Constitution of Romania, include freedom of conscience and freedom of expression.

In May 2011, a National Liberal deputy proposed a bill for the prevention of religious intolerance, which would have criminalized blasphemy. The bill was withdrawn, however, later that month.

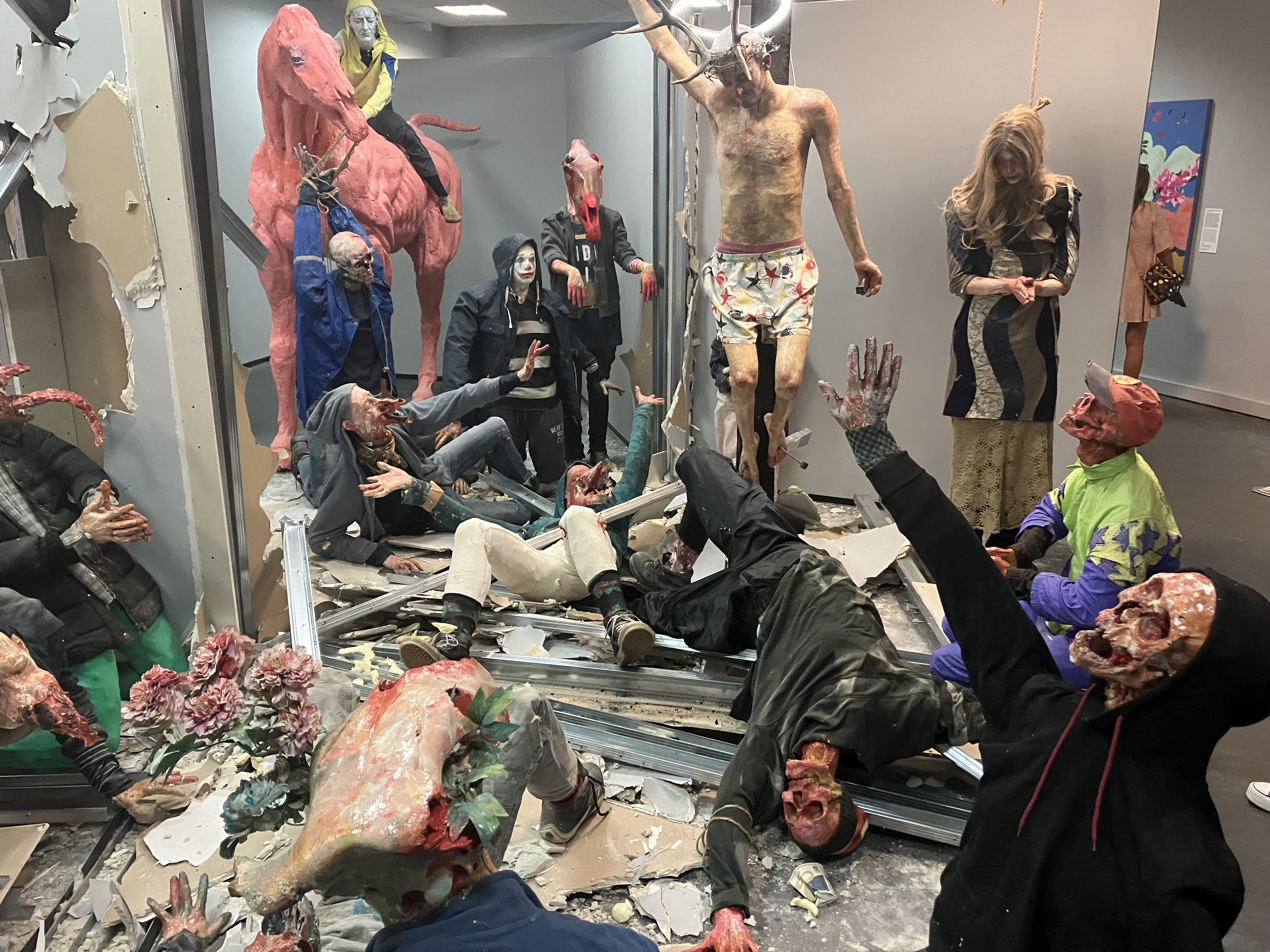
The central sculptural group of the exhibition "Nymphs and Zombies" by Paul Baraka. Bucharest, Art Safari Temporary Museum, 2023.

In January 2024, the management of the CNCD (National Council for Combating Discrimination) decided to fine the Bucharest City Museum, the Cultural Centre Art Society Foundation and the British curator Ruth Hibbard, for the Nymphs & Zombies exhibition, organized by Art Safari in the summer of 2023 to Bucharest. Artist Paul Baraka also received a warning for his works, including an installation in which Jesus is crucified in boxers and wearing deer horns, being worshiped by a group of "zombies" and an oil on canvas painting with elements from the Virgin Mary and the Child icon. In September 2023, the works were described by Vasile Bănescu, the spokesperson of the Romanian Orthodox Church, in terms such as "obscenity", "mockery", "blasphemy", "sacrilege".

==== Russia ====
After the 2012 Pussy Riot incident, Russian lawmakers started considering a bill proposing prison sentences for desecration. The State Duma investigated "the situation of sacrilegious acts against Church property and proposed amendments to the Russian Penal Code" in a bill submitted in September 2012. The Union of Orthodox Citizens and MP of United Russia supported the proposal, the latter stating: "We really should make some amendments to the Penal Code in order to cool down these outcasts who have nothing else to do in their lives other than commit such offenses."

The bill was accepted 11 June 2013. According to Article 148 of Russian Criminal Code it is declared a crime to conduct "public actions expressing explicit disrespect for society and committed for the purpose of offending the religious feelings of believers". Part 2 of the same article establishes stricter punishments for the aforementioned actions when coupled with desecration of holy symbols and (or) religious texts.

==== Seychelles ====
Section 128 of the Seychelles Penal Code criminalises "wounding religious feelings" with a penalty of imprisonment for a year.

==== South Africa ====
Blasphemy is a common law offence in South Africa, defined as "unlawfully, intentionally and publicly acting contemptuously towards God." Several legal writers have suggested that the illegality of blasphemy has become unconstitutional as a result of the adoption in 1994 of the Bill of Rights, which includes the right to freedom of expression. It has also been suggested that it is unconstitutional because the criminal prohibition only applies to blasphemy against Christianity, and therefore discriminates on the basis of religion.

Blasphemy prosecutions have been rare since the start of the twentieth century, to the point that writers in the early part of the century suggested that the crime had been abrogated through disuse. However, in 1934 a newspaper editor was convicted of blasphemy for publishing a story in which a nun has a vision of a sexual relationship with Jesus Christ, and the validity of the conviction was affirmed by the Appellate Division. In 1962 Harold Rubin was prosecuted for a painting depicting Christ naked on the cross along with inversions of Biblical sayings, but he was acquitted. In 1968 the editor of Varsity was prosecuted for publishing a report of a symposium on the topic "Is God Dead?", which quoted statements that "We must write God off entirely" and "[God] is beginning to stink". He was convicted, but at sentencing received only a caution and discharge.

The Equality Act of 2000 forbids hate speech, which is defined as "words based on one or more of the prohibited grounds, against any person, that could reasonably be construed to demonstrate a clear intention to: (a) be hurtful; (b) be harmful or to incite harm; (c) promote or propagate hatred." The "prohibited grounds" include religion, and thus some blasphemous speech falls within the scope of hate speech. The prohibition of hate speech is, however, not a criminal prohibition, and only civil penalties would result.

==== Spain ====
In 1988, the Spanish Parliament removed the blasphemy law from their legal system. However, article 525 of the Penal Code in Spain considers "vilification" of religious "feelings", "dogmas", "beliefs" or "rituals". This extension to "dogmas" and "beliefs" is considered by some as very close to a blasphemy law in practice.

For instance, in 2012 it was used to prosecute a famous artist, Javier Krahe, for a scene (shot 34 years earlier, and lasting just 54 seconds) in a documentary about him. He was discharged the same year.

In 2018, following the case of Willy Toledo and three feminist protesters accused of blasphemy, the governing PSOE and supporting party Unidas Podemos pledged an end to the "medieval laws on offending religious sentiments and insult to the Crown". Legislation was suspended following the announcement of the 2019 Spanish general election. The government and its allies were subsequently returned to power, which means the proposals will now likely return to the national parliament.

==== Sweden ====
Swedish laws do not explicitly prohibit blasphemy. In Sweden the 20th century saw the public adoption of the principle that religion was a personal matter. King Erik XIV had introduced a law in 1563 that specifically protected religion. That was followed by similar Acts until 1949, when they were replaced by an Act on "Peace of Faith" which was a milder form of restriction. In 1970, the 1949 Act was repealed and a new Act was introduced on "agitation against a specific group of people". The new Act protects minority groups who share "race, skin colour, national or ethnic origin, faith or sexual orientation". Thus, the Act does not protect any religion as such, but instead can protect the religion's practitioners. The new Act has most often been enforced when Jews and homosexuals have been attacked. The lack of prohibition and therefore legality to blaspheme the Quran, has been in the spotlight since 2020 as some people burnt the Quran in public. Some Muslim countries have demanded this be stopped by law in Sweden. In 2023, a man was given a suspended sentence for "agitation against a specific group of people", after having burnt a Quran and published a video of the event. More people have been sentenced since this, including far-right politician Rasmus Paludan, who was given a prison sentence.

==== Switzerland ====
In Switzerland, Article 261 of the penal code titled "Attack on the freedom of faith and the freedom to worship" (Störung der Glaubens- und Kultusfreiheit) is defined as:

"Any person who publicly and maliciously insults or mocks the religious convictions of others, and in particularly their belief in God, or maliciously desecrates objects of religious veneration, any person who maliciously prevents, disrupts or publicly mocks an act of worship, the conduct of which is guaranteed by the Constitution, or any person who maliciously desecrates a place or object that is intended for a religious ceremony or an act of worship the conduct of which is guaranteed by the Constitution, shall be liable to a monetary penalty."

==== Tanzania ====
The Constitution of Tanzania defines it as a secular state (Article 3), and protects freedom of expression (Article 18), freedom of conscience, faith and choice in matters of religion (Article 19). However, these provisions are not always upheld in practice. Zanzibar is a semi-autonomous island of Tanzania with its own constitution and a separate judicial system of Khadi's courts that may apply sharia in certain cases.

On mainland Tanzania, the Penal Code criminalises acts of sacrilege (destroying, damaging or defiling buildings or objects 'held sacred by any class of persons') and acts of uttering words with intent to wound religious feelings of any person under Articles 125 and 129 respectively; both count as misdemeanours that may be punished with imprisonment for up to one year. No information is available regarding whether or to what extent this provision is enforced. In Zanzibar, Section XIV of the Penal Decree Act of 2004 similarly criminalises acts of sacrilege (Article 117); Article 21 clarifies that this offence is punishable by imprisonment not exceeding two years and/or a fine. Uttering words with the intent to wound the religious feelings of any other person is punishable by imprisonment for a term not exceeding one year (Article 121).

In July 2012, Eva Abdulla was sentenced to two years' imprisonment on charges of blasphemy after she was accused of having urinated on a Quran. Abdullah was acquitted on appeal and released in January 2013.

==== Tuvalu ====
Section 127 of the Tuvalu Penal Code criminalises "wounding religious feelings" with a penalty of imprisonment for a year.

==== United Kingdom ====
The United Kingdom is made up of four distinct parts and several legal jurisdictions. In criminal justice matters, these jurisdictions are England and Wales, Scotland, and Northern Ireland. Blasphemy laws dating back to the medieval times were abolished in England and Wales in 2008 and Scotland in 2021. Equivalent laws remain in Northern Ireland but have not been used for many years.

English blasphemy laws were historically defended with the following reasoning: the "[blasphemy] law is needed to uphold the national law, which is based on Christianity. Thus, targeting Christianity is targeting the very foundation of England."

The last attempted prosecution under these laws was in 2007 when the evangelical group Christian Voice sought a private prosecution against the BBC over its broadcasting of the show Jerry Springer: The Opera (which includes a scene depicting Jesus, dressed as a baby, professing to be "a bit gay"). The charges were rejected by the City of Westminster magistrates court. Christian Voice applied to have this ruling overturned by the High Court, but the application was rejected. The court found that the common law blasphemy offences specifically did not apply to stage productions (s. 2(4) of the Theatres Act 1968) and broadcasts (s. 6 of the Broadcasting Act 1990).

The last successful blasphemy prosecution (also a private prosecution) was Whitehouse v. Lemon in 1977, when Denis Lemon, the editor of Gay News, was found guilty. His newspaper had published James Kirkup's poem "The Love that Dares to Speak its Name", which allegedly vilified Christ and his life. Lemon was fined £500 and given a suspended sentence of nine months' imprisonment. It had been "touch and go", said the judge, whether he would actually send Lemon to jail. In 2002, a deliberate and well-publicized public repeat reading of the poem took place on the steps of St Martin-in-the-Fields church in Trafalgar Square, but did not lead to any prosecution.

In 1696, a Scottish court sentenced Thomas Aikenhead to death for blasphemy. The last prosecution for blasphemy in Scotland was in 1843.

The last person in Britain to be imprisoned for blasphemy was John William Gott, on 9 December 1921. He had three previous convictions for blasphemy when he was prosecuted for publishing two pamphlets which satirized the biblical story of Jesus entering Jerusalem (Matthew 21:2–7), comparing Jesus to a circus clown. His last sentence was for nine months' hard labour.

In 1985, the Law Commission (England and Wales) published a report, Criminal Law: Offences against Religious and Public Worship, that concluded that the common law offences of blasphemy and blasphemous libel should be abolished without replacement. On 5 March 2008, an amendment was passed to the Criminal Justice and Immigration Act 2008 which abolished the common law offences of blasphemy and blasphemous libel in England and Wales. After royal assent the relevant section came into force on 8 July 2008. Blasphemy remains an offence under the common law in Northern Ireland.

The 1989 film Visions of Ecstasy was the only film ever banned in the UK for blasphemy. Following the abolition of the blasphemy laws in England and Wales in 2008, the film was eventually classified by the BBFC for release as 18-rated in 2012.

In 2021, the Scottish Parliament passed the Hate Crime and Public Order (Scotland) Act 2021 to reform hate crime legislation, providing better protection against race, sex, age and religious discrimination, and also decriminalising blasphemy. The common law offence of blasphemy was abolished from 1 April 2024. Humanists UK had been campaigning for repeal of Scotland's blasphemy law since 2015, and welcomed the change.

===== British Virgin Islands =====
Section 289 of the British Virgin Islands Criminal Code 1997 criminalises the use of "abusive, blasphemous, indecent, insulting, profane or threatening language" in a public place, punishable by a maximum prison sentence of three months or a fine up to US$250.

===== Montserrat =====
Section 325 of the Montserrat Penal Code criminalises the use of "abusive, blasphemous, indecent, insulting, profane or threatening language" in a public place, punishable by a maximum prison sentence of three months or a fine up to US$250.

==== United States ====
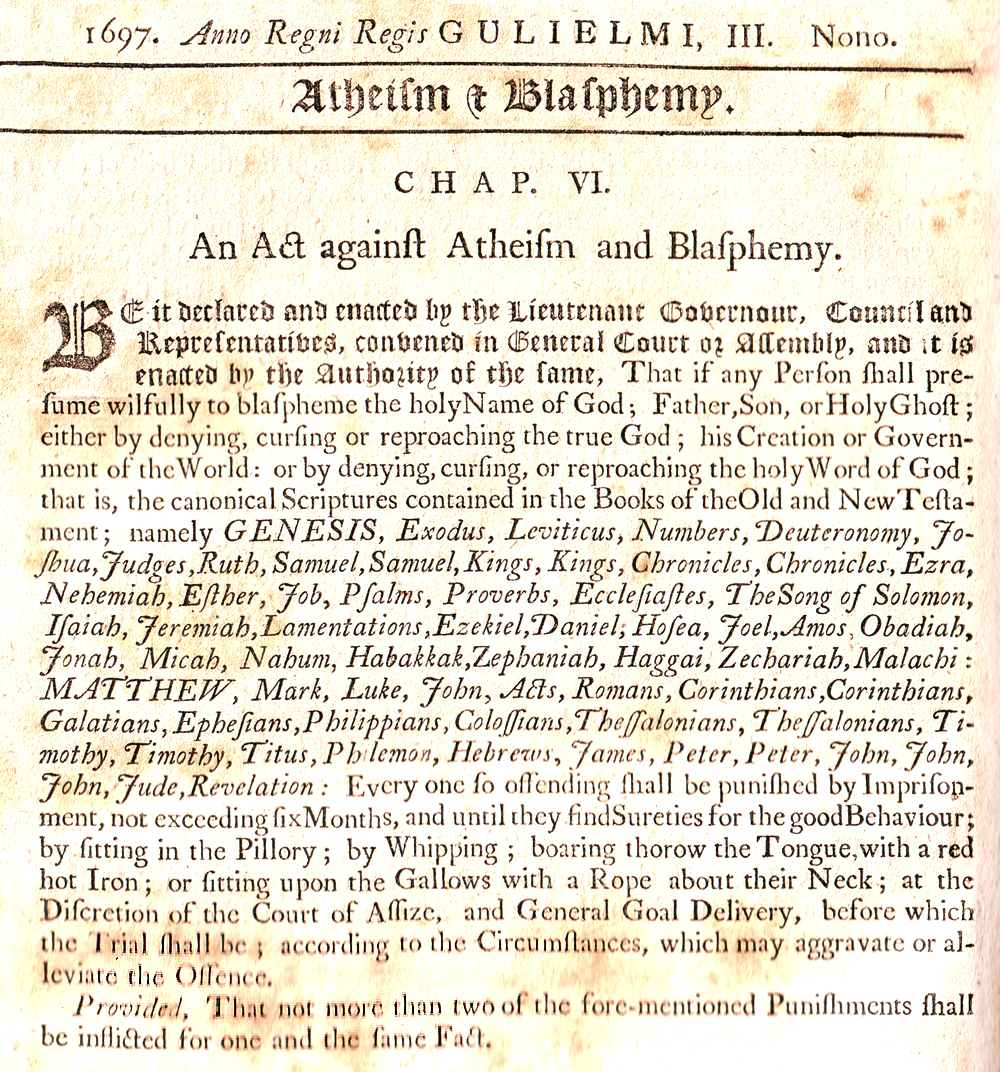
An Act against Atheism and Blasphemy, Massachusetts Bay Colony, 1697

In 1636, the Puritan-controlled Massachusetts Bay Colony made blasphemy – defined as "a cursing of God by atheism, or the like" – punishable by death.

Blasphemy was recognized as proscribed speech in the U.S. well into the 20th-century. The Constitution entailed a right to articulate views on religion, but not to commit blasphemy, with the Harvard Law Review stating, "The English common law had punished blasphemy as a crime, while excluding "disputes between learned men upon particular controverted points" from the scope of criminal blasphemy. Looking to this precedent, 19th-century American appellate courts consistently upheld proscriptions on blasphemy, drawing a line between punishable blasphemy and protected religious speech."

In Joseph Burstyn, Inc. v. Wilson, the U.S. Supreme Court ruled in 1952 that New York could not enforce a censorship law against filmmakers whose films contained "sacrilegious" content. The opinion of the Court, by Justice Clark, stated that: "From the standpoint of freedom of speech and the press, it is enough to point out that the state has no legitimate interest in protecting any or all religions from views distasteful to them which is sufficient to justify prior restraints upon the expression of those views. It is not the business of government in our nation to suppress real or imagined attacks upon a particular religious doctrine, whether they appear in publications, speeches, or motion pictures".

The Pennsylvania General Assembly enacted a blasphemy law in 1977 that forbade corporations from incorporating names containing words that "constitute blasphemy, profane cursing or swearing, or that profane the Lord's name." In 2007, filmmaker George Kalman had filed a limited liability company named I Choose Hell Productions, LLC. A week later he had received an unsigned letter explaining that his application was rejected because his company's name could not "contain words that constitute blasphemy." In February 2009, Kalman filed suit to have the provision against blasphemy struck down as unconstitutional. On June 30, 2010, U.S. District Judge Michael M. Bayslon of the Eastern District of Pennsylvania, in a 68-page opinion, ruled in favor of Kalman, finding that Pennsylvania's blasphemy statute violated both the Establishment Clause and the Free Exercise Clause of the First Amendment.

The United States and some individual state jurisdictions provide for stronger criminal penalties for crimes when committed against a person because of that person's religious or some other affiliations. For instance, Section 3A1.1 of the 2009 United States Sentencing Guidelines states that: "If the finder of fact at trial or, in the case of a plea of guilty or nolo contendere, the court at sentencing determines beyond a reasonable doubt that the defendant intentionally selected any victim or any property as the object of the offense of conviction because of the actual or perceived race, color, religion, national origin, ethnicity, gender, disability, or sexual orientation of any person," the sentencing court is required to increase the standard sentencing range.

=== Muslim-majority countries ===
In a number of countries where Islam is the state religion or where Muslims are a majority, values and attitudes derived from Islam have influenced censorious laws criminalising blasphemy, often attached to heavy punishments. Blasphemy in Islam is broadly defined as impious utterance or action concerning God, Muhammad or anything considered sacred in Islam. The Islamic holy book, the Quran, admonishes blasphemy, but does not specify the punishment. The hadiths, which are another source of sharia, suggest various punishments for blasphemy, including death.

==== Afghanistan ====
An Islamic emirate, Afghanistan prohibits blasphemy as an offense under Sharia. Blasphemy can be punished by retaliatory penalties up to and including execution by hanging. Since the Taliban takeover in 2021, people have been arrested for blasphemy.

==== Algeria ====
Although ninety-nine percent of Algeria's population is Sunni Muslim, and the Constitution declares that Islam is the state religion, Algeria uses retaliatory legislation rather than Sharia to combat blasphemy against Islam. The penalty for blasphemy can be up to 5 years of imprisonment and a fine.

==== Bangladesh ====
Bangladesh forbids blasphemy by a provision in its penal code that prohibits "hurting religious sentiments", and by other laws and policies that attack freedom of speech. In April 2013, Prime Minister Sheikh Hasina rejected calls for new laws from radical Islamist groups, notably Hefajat-e Islam, demanding death penalty for people involved in blasphemy. She described Bangladesh as a "secular democracy, where every religion had a right to be practiced freely and fairly", and that "if anyone was found guilty of hurting the sentiments of the followers of any religion or its venerable figures, there was a law to deal with it".

==== Egypt ====
Article 98(f) of the Egyptian Penal Code, as amended by Law 147/2006 states the penalty for blasphemy and similar crimes:

Confinement for a period of not less than six months and not exceeding five years, or a fine of not less than five hundred pounds and not exceeding one thousand pounds shall be the penalty inflicted on whoever makes use of religion in propagating, either by words, in writing, or in any other means, extreme ideas for the purpose of inciting strife, ridiculing or insulting a heavenly religion or a sect following it, or damaging national unity.

==== Indonesia ====
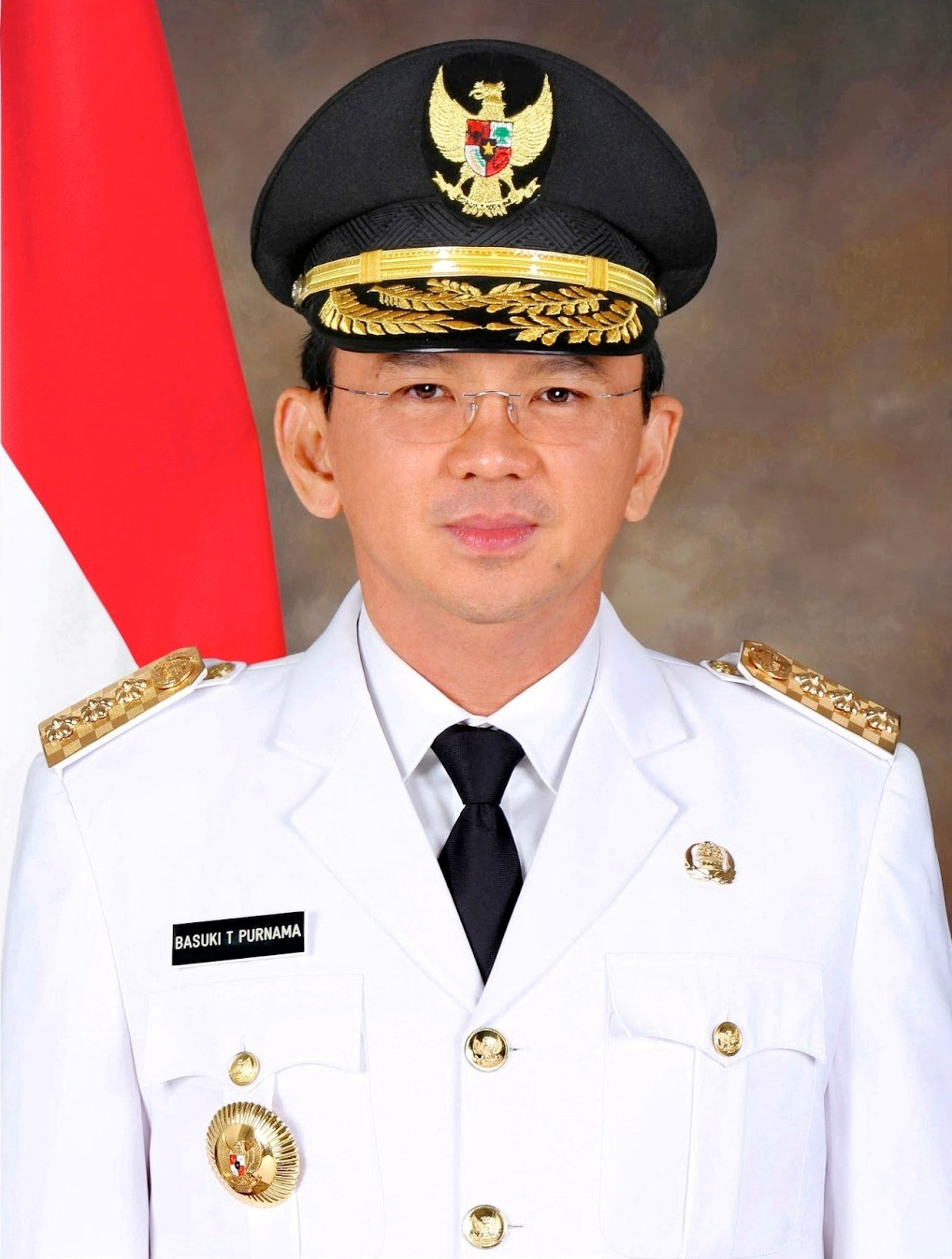
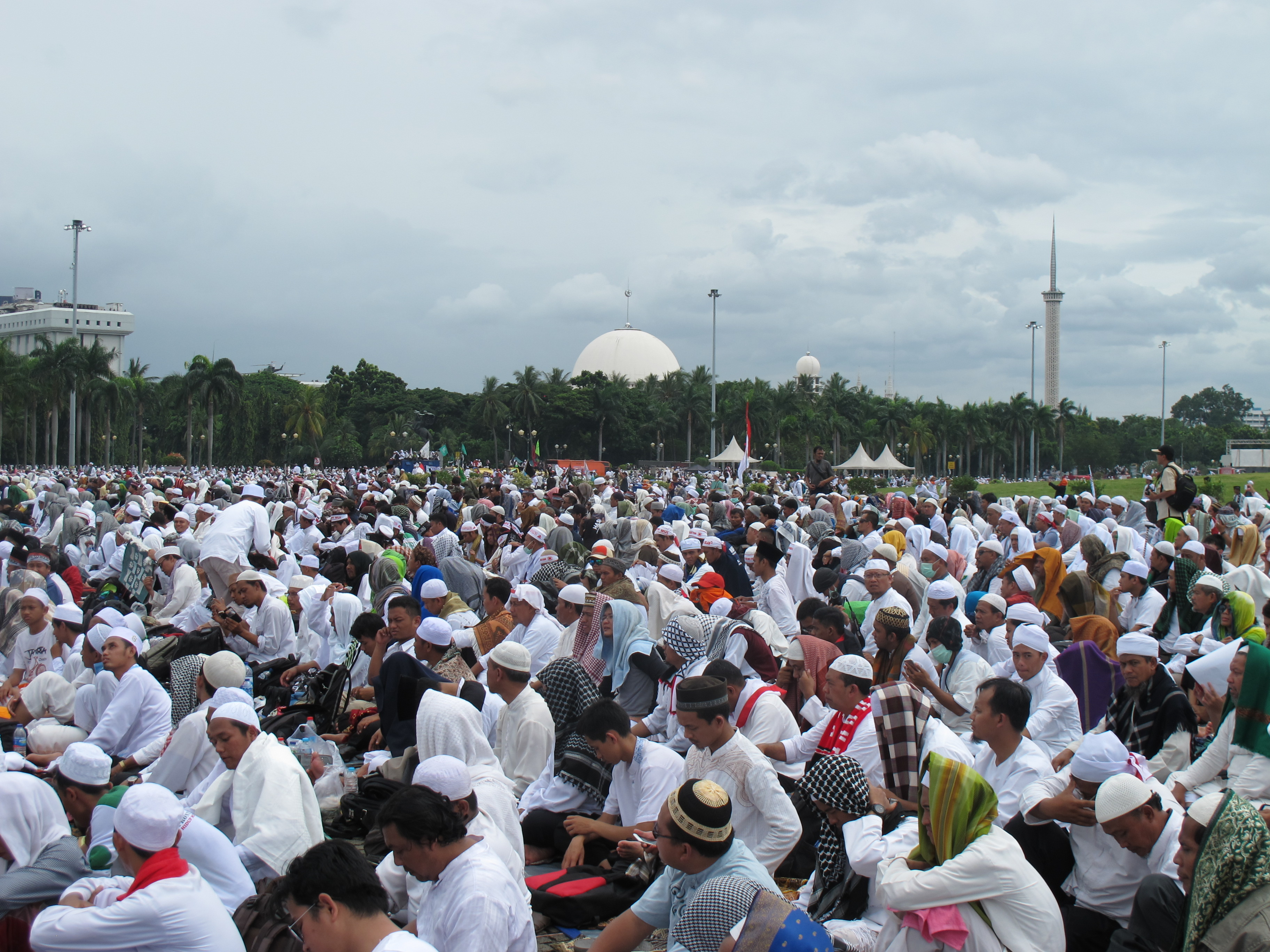
Basuki Tjahaja Purnama (left) was convicted of blasphemy against Islam and sentenced to two years' imprisonment. His speech in which he referenced a verse from the Quran sparked wide protests asking for his conviction.

Article 156(a) of Indonesia's Criminal Code forbids anyone from deliberately, in public, expressing feelings of hostility, hatred, or contempt against religions with the purpose of preventing others from adhering to any religion, and forbids anyone from disgracing a religion. The penalty for violating Article 156(a) is a maximum of five years of imprisonment.

==== Iran ====
An Islamic theocracy, Iran derives its law against blasphemy from Sharia. The law against blasphemy complements laws against criticizing the Islamic government, insulting Islam, and publishing materials that deviate from Islamic standards.

==== Jordan ====
Article 273 of Jordan's Penal Code criminalizes "scorning or reviling any of the Prophets" with imprisonment for up to three years. While article 278 criminalizes "publishing anything that would insult the religious feelings or religious beliefs of other people".

==== Kuwait ====
Article 6 of Kuwait's cybercrime laws mention a punishment of up to 12 months in prison and a 20,000 KWD (US$66,000) fine for insulting "God, the Holy Quran, Prophets, the Noble Companions of Prophet Muhammad, Wives of the Prophet, or persons who are part of the Prophet's family".

==== Malaysia ====
Malaysia prevents insult to religion and to the religious by education, by restrictions upon the broadcasting and publishing media, and by the legal system. Some states in the Malaysian federation operate Sharia courts to protect Islam, and, when Sharia is not applicable, the Malaysian Penal Code provides penalties for offenses against religion.

==== Mauritania ====
The crime of apostasy is defined in section IV (entitled Act of Indecency toward Islam) of the Mauritanian Penal Code, established under the order of 9 July 1983. Article 306, paragraph 1 of the criminal code indicates, "Every Muslim guilty of the crime of apostasy, either by word or by action of apparent or obvious, will be invited to repent within three days."

==== Nigeria ====
Nigeria prohibits blasphemy by section 204 of its Criminal Code and by permitting Sharia courts to operate in some states. Vigilantism frequently usurps the jurisdiction of the courts.

==== Northern Cyprus ====
According to the U.S. Department of State, blasphemy is criminalised in Northern Cyprus, but the law is rarely enforced.

==== Pakistan ====
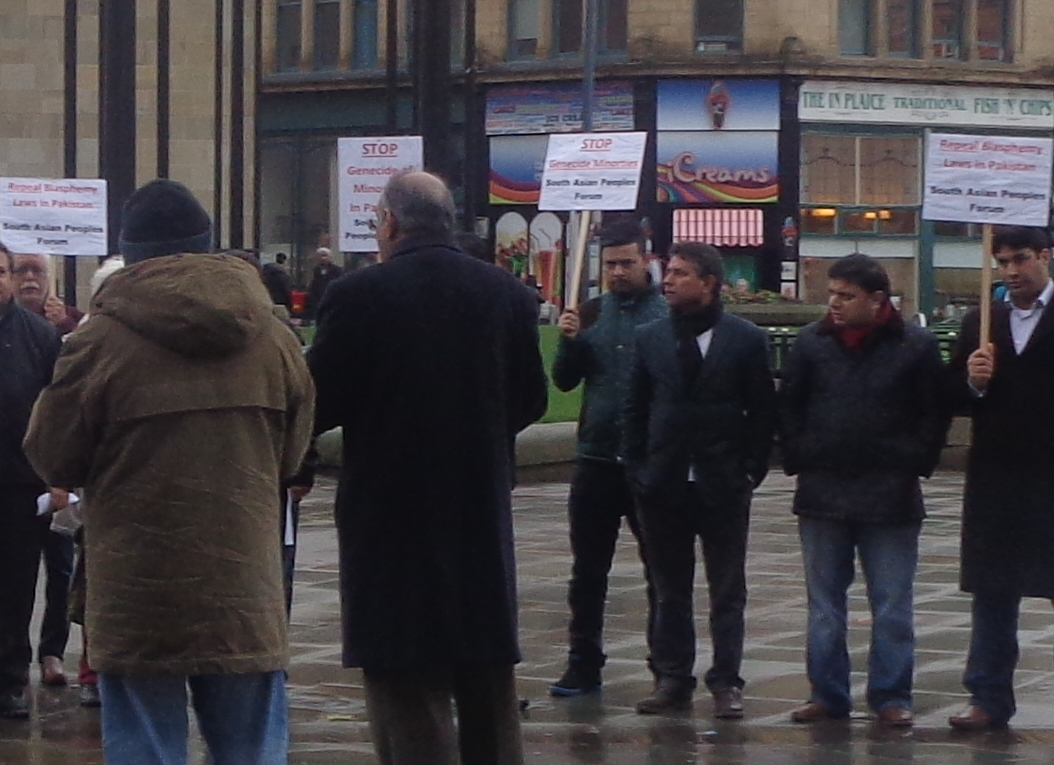
Protest to repeal Pakistan's blasphemy law in Bradford (2014)

More people are on death row or serving life sentences for blasphemy in Pakistan than in any other country in the world.

The anti-blasphemy laws in Pakistan are quite complicated. Offenders may be vigorously prosecuted. Chapter XV of Pakistan Penal Code deals with "offences relating to religion":

- §295. Injuring or defiling place of worship, with intent to insult the religion of any class.
- §295-A. Deliberate and malicious acts intended to outrage religious feelings of any class by insulting Its religion or religious beliefs.
- §295-B. Defiling, etc., of Holy Qur'an.
- §295-C. Use of derogatory remarks, etc., in respect of the Holy Prophet.
- §296. Disturbing religious assembly.
- §297. Trespassing on burial places, etc.
- §298. Uttering words, etc., with deliberate intent to wound religious feelings.
- §298-A. Use of derogatory remarks, etc., in respect of holy personages.
- §298-B. Misuse of epithets, descriptions and titles, etc., reserved for certain holy personages or places.
- §298-C. Person of Qadiani group, etc., calling himself a Muslim or preaching or propagating his faith:

There is a death penalty for blasphemy in Pakistan (only under section 295 c). Those prosecuted are usually minorities such as Ahmadiyya and Christians but it seems that they are also increasingly other Muslims. Persons accused of blasphemy as well as police, lawyers, and judges have been subject to harassment, threats, attacks, and murders when blasphemy is the issue.

In November 2008 Pakistan's government appointed Shahbaz Bhatti as Federal Minister for Minorities and gave him cabinet rank. Bhatti had promised that the Asif Ali Zardari government would review Pakistan's blasphemy laws. Pakistan has been an active supporter of the campaign by the Organisation of the Islamic Conference to create global laws against blasphemy.

Minister Bhatti was shot dead on 2 March 2011 in Islamabad, the capital of Pakistan. On 19 March 2014, Pakistani English-language newspaper, The Nation, conducted a poll of its readers that showed only 8% of Pakistanis believe the blasphemy law should be repealed.

In September 2016 a sixteen-year-old Christian teenage boy, Nabeel Chohan, was arrested in Pakistan after he made a Facebook post that was blasphemous. According to Punjab Police, the teenager was jailed and was awaiting trial for sharing the post on social media.

In November 2017 a well-known and Influential Islamist group Tehreek-i-Labaik Ya Rasool Allah Pakistan in Pakistan staged a sit-in in the capital Islamabad. They forced the government to abandon an amendment to the oath sworn by election candidates that allowed for a variation in the oath because of the candidates religious beliefs. They also caused the law minister Zahid Hamid to resign.

==== Palestine ====
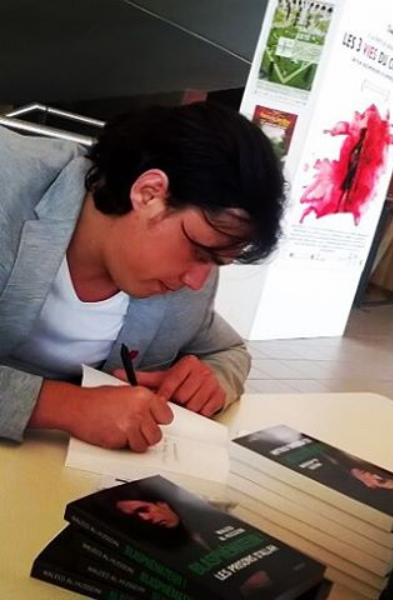
Waleed Al-Husseini signs a copy of The Blasphemer in 2015.

The Palestinian National Authority has several provisions in civil and military law against blasphemy. An infamous 2010 case, in which these were employed to attempt a prosecution, was that of Waleed Al-Husseini, a young man from the West Bank town of Qalqilya who had left Islam to become an atheist, and openly challenged and ridiculed religion online. He was arrested without charges and jailed in October 2010, after which the Palestinian Authority alleged Al-Husseini had committed blasphemy on the Internet. A Palestinian human rights expert at the time expected Al-Husseini to be tried according to a 1960 Jordanian law against defaming religion, which was still in force in the West Bank. Instead, Al-Husseini was charged with three counts of incitement according to the Palestine Military Code of Justice, namely: "inciting religious hatred" (Article 177), "insulting religious leaders" (Article 225 and 226/B), and "offending religious views" (Article 230/A). He was eventually released after 10 months in prison due to heavy international diplomatic pressure, primarily exerted by France.

==== Qatar ====
The penalty for committing blasphemy in Qatar is a jail sentence of up to seven years. Additionally, the law stipulates a one-year prison sentence or QR1,000 fine for defamation of Islam by producing or promoting defamatory imagery.

Religious criticism on websites is censored in Qatar. The censorship office of the Qatar General Broadcasting and Television Corporation monitors imported foreign broadcasting for sensitive religious content.

A blasphemy accusation against a Muslim could be taken as evidence of apostasy from Islam, a separate criminal offence which carries the death penalty. However, no punishment for apostasy has been recorded since 1971.

==== Saudi Arabia ====
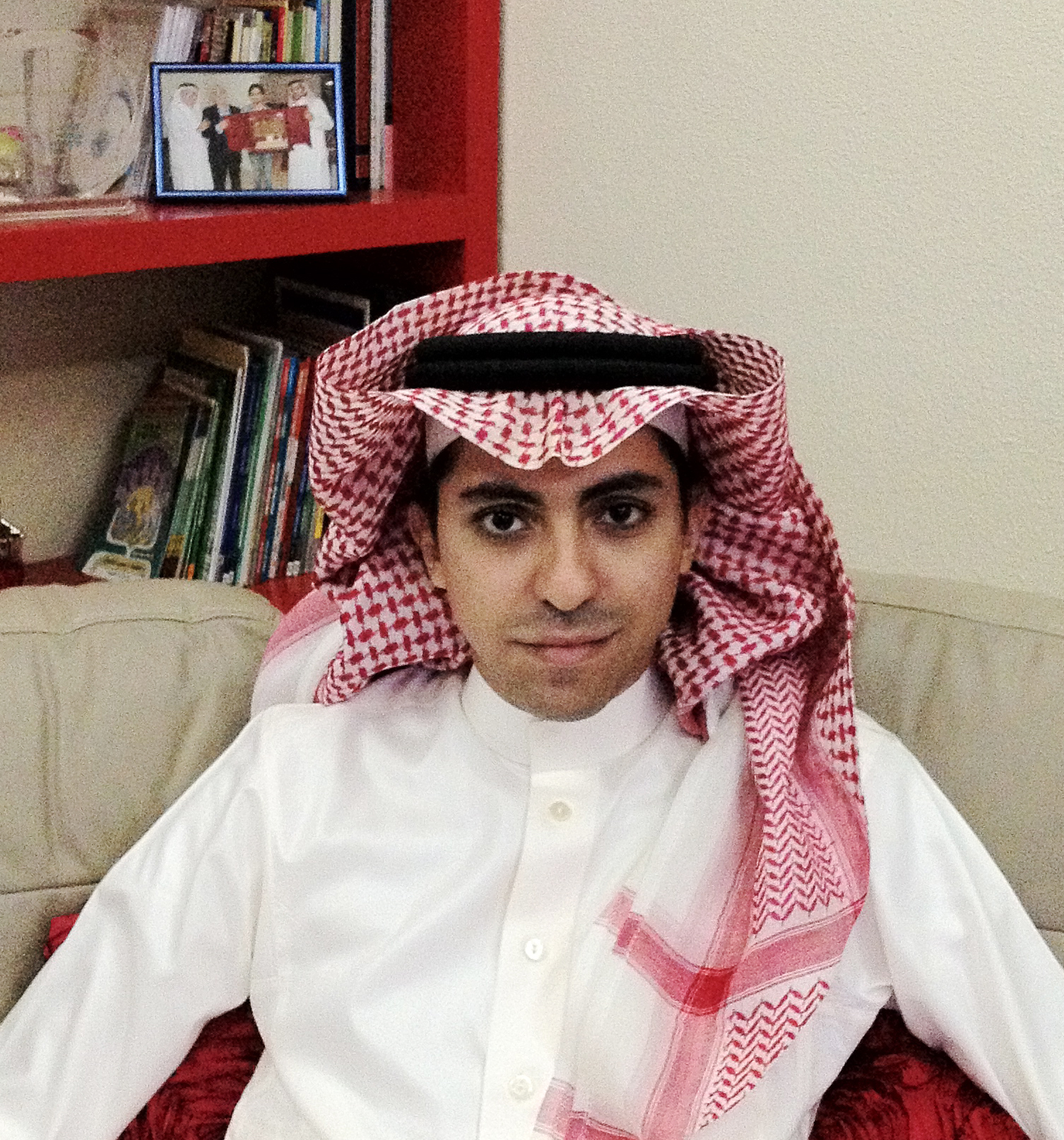
Saudi Arabian activist Raif Badawi was arrested for blasphemy.

Islam is Saudi Arabia's state religion. The country's monarchy follows Sunni Islam. The country's laws are an amalgam of rules from Sharia, royal edicts, and fatwas from the Council of Senior Religious Scholars; they prescribe penalties up to the death penalty for blasphemy.

==== Sudan ====
Section 125 of the Sudanese Criminal Act prohibits "insulting religion, inciting hatred and showing contempt for religious beliefs". The section includes as penalties: imprisonment, a fine, and a maximum of forty lashes. In November 2007, the section gave rise to the Sudanese teddy bear blasphemy case. In December 2007, the section was used against two Egyptian booksellers. They were sentenced to six months in prison because they sold a book that the court deemed an insult to Aisha, one of Prophet Mohammed's wives.

In May 2005, the authorities arrested Mohammed Taha Mohammed Ahmed, and charged him with violating section 125. Ahmed was the editor-in-chief of a daily newspaper Al-Wifaq. The paper had published an article about a 500-year-old Islamic manuscript which says the real name of Mohammed's father was not Abdallah but Abdel Lat, or Slave of Lat, an idol of the pre-Islamic era. A court fined Al-Wifaq eight million Sudanese pounds—the paper was shut down for three months—but acquitted Ahmed. Ahmed was found decapitated in September 2006.

In July 2020, Sudan repealed its apostasy law (Article 126 of the Penal Code). The United States Commission on International Religious Freedom (USCIRF) applauded this on 15 July 2020, but urged Sudanese lawmakers to repeal the blasphemy law (Article 125 of the Sudanese Penal Code) as well.

==== Turkey ====
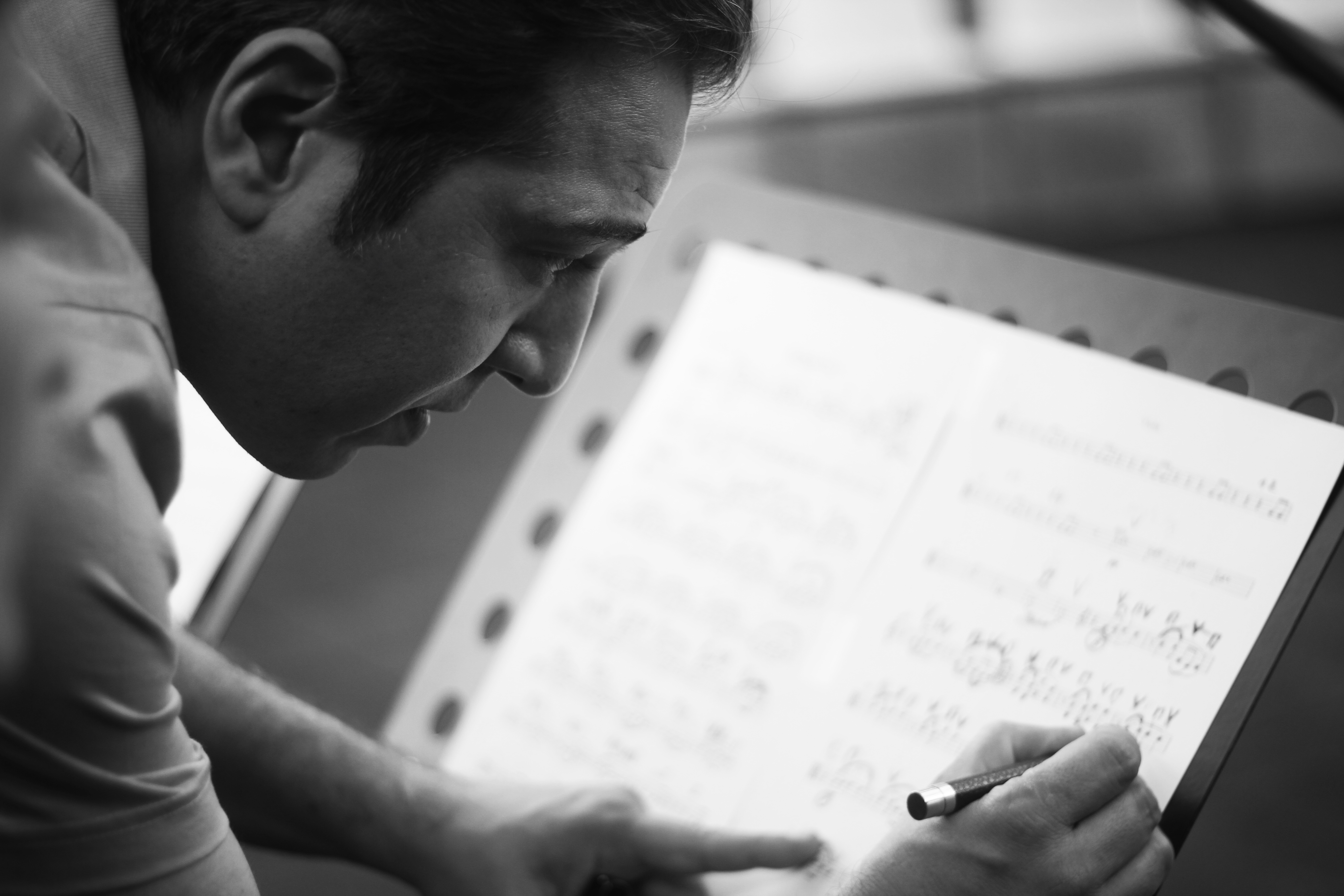
Fazıl Say during rehearsals in 2011

Article 216 of the Turkish Penal Code ("Provoking people to be rancorous and hostile") criminalizes blasphemy and religious insult, as well as hate speech. The article, which is in the fifth section of the Turkish Penal Code ("Offenses Against Public Peace") is as follows:

Article 216. – Provoking people to be rancorous and hostile

(1) Any person who openly provokes a group of people belonging to different social class, religion, race, sect, or coming from another origin, to be rancorous or hostile against another group, is punished with imprisonment from one year to three years in case of such act causes risk from the aspect of public safety.

(2) Any person who openly humiliates another person just because they belong to different social class, religion, race, sect, or comes from another origin, is punished with imprisonment from six months to one year.

(3) Any person who openly disrespects the religious belief of a group is punished with imprisonment from six months to one year if such act causes potential risk for public peace.

On 1 June 2012, pianist Fazıl Say came under investigation by the Istanbul Prosecutor's Office over statements made on Twitter, declaring himself an atheist and retweeting a message poking fun at the Islamic conception of paradise. On 15 April 2013, Say was sentenced to 10 months in jail, reduced from 12 months for good behavior in court. The sentence was suspended, meaning he was allowed to move freely provided he did not repeat the offence in the next five years. On appeal, Turkey's Supreme Court of Appeals reversed the conviction on 26 October 2015, ruling that Say's Twitter posts fell within the bounds of freedom of thought and freedom of expression.

==== United Arab Emirates ====
The United Arab Emirates (UAE) law against blasphemy is governed by article 312 of the United Arab Emirates Penal Code. The country's state religion is Islam. According to the article, the following offences if perpetrated publicly shall be a subject to a jail sentence for a minimum period of one year or a fine:

- Offence to any of the Islamic sacred beliefs or rites.
- Insult to any of the divine recognized religions.
- Approving, encouraging or promoting sinful actions.
- Knowingly eating pork meat by Muslims

==== Yemen ====
Accusations of blasphemy in Yemen are often aimed at religious minorities, intellectuals and artists, reporters, human rights defenders, and opponents of the ruling party. Vigilantism or abuse by the authorities can kill an accused or force them into exile. The accused in Yemen is subject to Islamic law (Sharia). Sharia, according to some interpretations, prescribes death as the proper punishment for blasphemy.

=== Atheist state ===
==== China ====
China, officially an atheist state, banned a book titled "Xing Fengsu" ("Sexual Customs"), which had allegedly insulted Islam, and placed its authors under arrest in 1989, after protests in Lanzhou and Beijing by Chinese Hui Muslims, during which the Chinese police provided protection to the Hui Muslim protestors, and the Chinese government organized public burnings of the book. The Chinese government assisted them and gave into their demands because Hui do not have a separatist movement, unlike the Uyghurs, Hui Muslim protestors who violently rioted by vandalizing property during the protests against the book were let off by the Chinese government and went unpunished while Uyghur protestors were imprisoned.

In 2007, anticipating the coming "Year of the Pig" in the Chinese calendar, depictions of pigs were banned from CCTV "to avoid conflicts with ethnic minorities". This is believed to refer to China's population of 20 million Muslims (to whom pigs are considered "unclean").

In response to the 2015 Charlie Hebdo shooting Chinese state-run media attacked Charlie Hebdo for publishing the cartoons insulting Muhammad, with the state-run Xinhua advocated limiting freedom of speech, while another state-run newspaper Global Times said the attack was "payback" for what it characterized as Western colonialism and accusing Charlie Hebdo of trying to incite a clash of civilizations.

=== Jewish state ===
==== Israel ====
In Israel, blasphemy laws were first enacted by the pre-State British Mandate in an attempt to suppress the 1929 Palestine riots.

Blasphemy is covered by Articles 170 and 173 of the penal code:

Insult to religion
170. If a person destroys, damages, or desecrates a place of worship or any object which is held sacred by a group of persons, with the intention of reviling their religion, or in the knowledge that they are liable to deem that act an insult to their religion, then the one is liable to three years' imprisonment.

Injury to religious sentiment
173. If a person does any of the following, then the one is liable to one year's imprisonment:
(1) One publishes a publication that is liable to crudely offend the religious faith or sentiment of others;
(2) One voices in a public place and in the hearing of another person any word or sound that is liable to crudely offend the religious faith or sentiment of others.

The law has been rarely enforced. However, one right-wing Jewish activist was sentenced to two years in prison after scattering leaflets in Hebron in 1997, which pictured Muhammed as a pig desecrating the Quran.

=== Hindu and Buddhist-majority countries ===
==== India ====
Indian religions (also called Dharmic religions), Hinduism and its offshoots Buddhism and Jainism, traditionally have no concept of blasphemy. Nāstika, roughly translated as atheist or atheism, are valid and accepted streams of in Indian religions where Buddhism, Jainism, as well as Samkhya, Cārvāka and Ājīvika in Hinduism are considered atheist or agnostic school of philosophy in the Indian religions.

Section 295A of the Indian Penal Code has been used as a blasphemy law to prevent insulting Christianity, Islam and other religions practised in India. The British-era section 295A of the penal code is extant and has not been repealed; it contains an anti-blasphemy law. Section 295A was introduced in 1927, in the aftermath of Rangila Rasul incident, to prevent "hate speech that insults or attempts to insult the religion or the religious beliefs" of any class of citizen with deliberate and malicious intention to outrage their religious feelings but the main purpose of this law has been to maintain "public order in a multireligious and religiously sensitive society." An important difference between the offence in the Indian Penal Code and English common law is that the defendant must have a "deliberate and malicious intention of outraging religious feelings" in the Indian code while English common law had no such inclusion. Section 295A has, nevertheless, been used a number of times to prevent free and honest discussion on religious issues and remains a threat to freedom of expression. The same section 295A appears in the penal codes of Pakistan and Myanmar where it is used as a blasphemy law. There have been widespread calls in India from civil society to repeal the regressive British-era code. In 1860, laws were created in British India that made it a "crime to disturb a religious assembly, trespass on burial grounds, insult religious beliefs or intentionally destroy or defile a place or an object of worship, punishable by up to 10 years in jail." In India, many people are arrested in accordance with the above-mentioned laws. Cases include those of: Kamlesh Tiwari, Tarak Biswas, and Sanal Edamaruku. Many books are banned for blasphemous content.

==== Myanmar ====
Section 295A and 298 of the Myanmar Penal Code are used to prosecute people for blasphemy. The Myanmar Penal Code shares a common origin with the penal codes of Pakistan and India and other British colonies in the Penal Code of 1860. The offences are:

Chapter XV

OF OFFENCES RELATING TO RELIGION

- 295. Injuring or defiling place of worship, with intent to insult the religion of any class.
- 295A. Deliberate and malicious acts intended to outrage religious feelings of any class by insulting its religion or religious beliefs.
- 296. Disturbing religious assembly.
- 297. Trespassing on burial – places, etc.
- 298. Uttering words, etc.; with deliberate intent to wound religious feelings.

Section 295 and 295A carry a maximum penalty of two years' imprisonment, a fine, or both, and sections 296, 297 and 298 a maximum of one year's imprisonment, a fine, or both. Section 295A was added to the Penal code by a legislative amendment in 1927, in the aftermath of Rangeela Rasool incident where a Muslim fatally stabbed a Hindu editor after he was acquitted by the then existing law. It was intended to protect religious minorities. It was a response to a perceived need to prohibit incitement against Muslim minorities by Hindu nationalists in India, but is now used in Myanmar to protect Buddhist nationalists against prosecution for incitement against Muslim minorities.

In December 2014, bar owner Tun Thurein and bar managers Htut Ko Lwin and New Zealander Philip Blackwood who ran the VGastro Bar in Yangon were arrested and sentenced in March 2015 to two-and-a-half years of hard labour after posting a psychedelic image of the Buddha wearing headphones to promote their bar on the internet. In June 2015, writer and former National League for Democracy information officer, Htin Lin Oo was sentenced to two years of hard labour for violating section 295A. The charge resulted from a speech in which he accused several prominent Buddhist organisations of extreme nationalism with particularly reference to Ashin Wirathu, who has been accused of hate speech and incitement of violence against Muslims by international observers many times since anti-Rohingya violence erupted in 2012.

==== Nepal ====
Section 9.156 of a new criminal code act passed by parliament on 8 August 2017 serves as a blasphemy law. It criminalised for the first time the 'hurting of religious sentiment' and carries a penalty of up to two years imprisonment and a fine of 20,000 Rupees. The new law came into force on 17 August 2018

==== Thailand ====
Despite Thailand's constitution declaring freedom of religion and the lack of an official religion, Theravada Buddhism still plays a very important role in Thai society, both legally and culturally. The constitution declares that the King of Thailand must be Buddhist and a defender of Buddhism. The 1962 Sangha Act outlaws insults or defamation of Buddhism and Buddhist clergy. These include damaging statues of the Buddha; stealing, buying or taking these out of Thailand; taking photos of them; sitting with feet facing them; touching these on the head; and wearing tattoos depicting the Buddha. Foreigners visiting Thailand are sternly warned not to do the aforementioned acts when entering the country. The 1956 penal code, in sections 206 and 208, also outlaws insulting or disrupting places and services of any religion recognized by the Thai government. Violations range from 1 to 7 years imprisonment, to a fine of 2,000 to 14,000 baht.

== Defamation of religion and the United Nations ==
Article 19 of the International Covenant on Civil and Political Rights (ICCPR) 1976 obliges signatory countries to guarantee everyone the right to hold opinions without restriction and to guarantee the right to freedom of expression, to impart information and ideas of all kinds, either orally, in writing or in print, in art, or through any other media. Paragraph 3 of article 19 allows for certain restrictions to freedom expression that are both necessary and provided by law to safeguard the reputations of others, for the protection of national security or of public order, or of public health or morals and article 20 obliges countries to prohibit "propaganda for war or advocacy of national, racial or religious hatred that constitutes incitement to discrimination, hostility or violence."

In July 2011, the UN Human Rights Committee released a 52-paragraph statement, General Comment 34 on the International Covenant on Civil and Political Rights, concerning freedoms of opinion and expression. Paragraph 48 states:

Prohibitions of displays of lack of respect for a religion or other belief system, including blasphemy laws, are incompatible with the Covenant, except in the specific circumstances envisaged in article 20, paragraph 2, of the Covenant. Such prohibitions must also comply with the strict requirements of article 19, paragraph 3, as well as such articles as 2, 5, 17, 18 and 26. Thus, for instance, it would be impermissible for any such laws to discriminate in favour of or against one or certain religions or belief systems, or their adherents over another, or religious believers over non-believers. Nor would it be permissible for such prohibitions to be used to prevent or punish criticism of religious leaders or commentary on religious doctrine and tenets of faith.

The Organisation of Islamic Cooperation have petitioned the "United Nations to create global laws criminalising insults to religion".

Three United Nations Special Rapporteurs—the Special Rapporteurs on freedom of religion or belief, on the right to freedom of opinion and expression and on contemporary forms of racism, racial discrimination, xenophobia and related intolerance—released a joint statement during the Durban Review Conference in Geneva in 2009. They stated that: "the difficulties in providing an objective definition of the term "defamation of religions" at the international level make the whole concept open to abuse. At the national level, domestic blasphemy laws can prove counter-productive, since this could result in the de facto censure of all inter-religious and intra-religious criticism. Many of these laws afford different levels of protection to different religions and have often proved to be applied in a discriminatory manner. There are numerous examples of persecution of religious minorities or dissenters, but also of atheists and non-theists, as a result of legislation on religious offences or overzealous application of laws that are fairly neutral."

The Rabat Plan of Action (2012) on the prohibition of advocacy of national, racial or religious hatred that constitutes incitement to discrimination, hostility or violence Conclusions and recommendations emanating from the four regional expert workshops organised by the Office of the United Nations High Commissioner for Human Rights (OHCHR), in 2011, and adopted by experts in Rabat, Morocco on 5 October 2012 stated that: "At the national level, blasphemy laws are counter-productive, since they may result in the de facto censure of all inter-religious/belief and intra-religious/belief dialogue, debate, and also criticism, most of which could be constructive, healthy and needed. In addition, many of these blasphemy laws afford different levels of protection to different religions and have often proved to be applied in a discriminatory manner. There are numerous examples of persecution of religious minorities or dissenters, but also of atheists and non-theists, as a result of legislation on religious offences or overzealous application of various laws that use a neutral language. Moreover, the right to freedom of religion or belief, as enshrined in relevant international legal standards, does not include the right to have a religion or a belief that is free from criticism or ridicule." The Plan of Action recommended that: "States that have blasphemy laws should repeal these as such laws have a stifling impact on the enjoyment of freedom of religion or belief and healthy dialogue and debate about religion".

== Campaigns for repeal ==
France (apart from Alsace-Moselle) repealed its blasphemy law in 1881, Sweden in 1970. A series of countries, especially in Europe, began repealing their blasphemy laws in the early 21st century. A systematic global campaign to abolish all blasphemy laws around the world was launched under the slogan "End Blasphemy Laws" by secular humanist and atheist organizations, such as International Humanist and Ethical Union (IHEU), the European Humanist Federation (EHF) and numerous coalition partners on 30 January 2015, in direct response to the Charlie Hebdo shooting on 7 January 2015.

=== Initiatives in Europe ===
The Parliamentary Assembly of the Council of Europe in Strasbourg, France, which has been deliberating on the issue of blasphemy law, the resolution that blasphemy should not be a criminal offence, adopted on 29 June 2007 in the Recommendation 1805 (2007) on blasphemy, religious insults and hate speech against persons on grounds of their religion. This Recommendation set a number of guidelines for member states of the Council of Europe in view of Articles 10 (freedom of expression) and 9 (freedom of thought, conscience and religion) of the European Convention on Human Rights.

In place of blasphemy or in addition to blasphemy in some European countries is the crime of "religious insult", which is a subset of the crime of blasphemy. As of March 2009, it was forbidden in Andorra, Cyprus, Croatia, the Czech Republic, Spain, Finland, Germany, Greece, Italy, Lithuania, Norway, the Netherlands, Poland, Portugal, the Russian Federation, Slovakia, Switzerland, Turkey and Ukraine.

On 23 October 2008, the Venice Commission, the Council of Europe's advisory body on constitutional matters, issued a report about blasphemy, religious insult, and incitement to religious hatred. The report noted that, at the time in Europe, blasphemy was an offence in Austria, Denmark, Finland, Greece, Italy, Liechtenstein, the Netherlands, and San Marino.

=== Repealings by jurisdiction ===
The common law offences of blasphemy and blasphemous libel were abolished in England and Wales in 2008 with the passage of the Criminal Justice and Immigration Act. Other countries to abolish or repeal blasphemy laws include France in 1881 (except for the Alsace-Moselle region, part of Germany at the time), Sweden in 1970, Norway with Acts in 2009 and 2015, the Netherlands in 2014, Iceland in 2015, Malta in 2016, France for its Alsace-Moselle region in 2016, Denmark in 2017, Canada in 2018, New Zealand and Greece in 2019, Ireland in 2020, and Scotland in 2021. Australia abolished and repealed all blasphemy laws at the Federal Level in 1995 but blasphemy laws remain in some States and Territories. On 26 October 2018, a referendum in the Republic of Ireland resulted in the removal of the Constitutional provision and the 2009 Defamation Act provision against blasphemy, which was implemented in January 2020.

Jurisdiction	Enacted	Repealed	Notes
Australia	1788	1995	Abolished at federal level, but some States and Territories still maintain blasphemy laws.
Canada	1892	2018	The Criminal Code Act 1892 abolished the pre-existing common law offences of Blasphemy and Blasphemous libel but enacted the crime of Blasphemous libel.
Czechoslovakia	1918	1950	Blasphemy law was retaken from the penal code of Austria-Hungary.
Denmark	1683	2017 (reenacted in 2023)	
England and Wales	1539	2008	
France	1254	1881	Not abolished in the Alsace-Moselle region until 2016.
Greece	1834	2019	Enacted on 1 July 2019.
Iceland	1940	2015	
Ireland	1937	2018/20	Following the Thirty-seventh Amendment of the Constitution of Ireland in 2018, mentions of blasphemy were removed from Irish statute by legislation in January 2020.
Malta	1933	2016	
Netherlands	1886	2014	In 1932, the law was made more strict.
New Zealand	1893	2019	The Criminal Code Act 1893 abolished and replaced the common law offences of Blasphemy and Blasphemous libel introduced in 1840 with a code offence of Blasphemous libel.
Norway	1902	2009/15	In 2009 removed from the new 2005 penal code, which was not enacted until 2015.
Scotland	1661	2021	Last prosecution was in 1843. 2021 legislation for repeal took effect in 2024.
Sweden	1563	1970	The 1563 law was replaced in 1949.

== See also ==
- Freedom of speech
  - Backlash against anti–blasphemy laws
  - Defamation of religion and the United Nations
  - International Blasphemy Day
  - Islam and blasphemy
- Hate speech
- Insult (legal)
- Lists of executed people for religious offenses
- Religious intolerance
