= Sjaka Septembir =

South African poet, writer, performer and director

Sjaka Septembir (born 20 July 1972 in Port Elizabeth, South Africa) is a South African poet, writer, performer and director.

== Early years ==
In 1994, Sjaka self-published his first novellette Viva Dada! under the name Jan Afganistan. Antjie Krog described it as ‘a book about this, that and everything' (Die Suid-Afrikaan). Viva Dada! later inspired Koos Kombuis’s Ronde Roman.

== Writer ==
In 1996, he self-published Christ Spiders Like a Coacaroach (sic) in English and Terpentyn Canves (sic) in Afrikaans (publications). These two books of poetry appeared under the name Shaka September.

His work is influenced by Punk, Dada, Abject Art and the Beats. He has become known for his unsettling happenings, cut-‘n’-paste magazines and self-published books of poetry.

He has been described as a "contemporary literary terrorist".V

== Pseudonyms and identities ==
The name Sjaka S. Septembir is a constructed identity created by pairing up the name of the Zulu warrior king Shaka Zulu with the Cape coloured surname, Coloured. It is a controversial term, referring to a predominantly Afrikaans people whose roots can be traced back to Creole and Dutch ancestry. The slave trade at the Cape was the vehicle that brought these peoples together and resulted in what is commonly (and controversially) referred to as Coloured people. It is a prevalent surname in the Western Cape – but in this context it is spelt September. The initial "S" in Sjaka S. Septembir functions as a mask or a chameleon that is free to take on any word that starts with "S", e.g. Sjaka Shagwell Septembir.

Other identities arise from it, including Dr. Adam Chaos, Diamandt Wolf and Jan Afganistan.

== Porselynnkas ==
Septembir was a founding member of the art movement Porselynnkas in 1996. Porselynnkas was made up of artists, writers and performers situated in Stellenbosch between 1996-1999. Other members included Floyed de Vaal as Sigmunt Floyed, Alex Omega, Jaap Ysbeert, Willem Mulder, Vuyo, Asha Zero and Naomie Smit.

The name Porselynnkas comes from the Afrikaans idiom ‘Daar’s ‘n aap in die porseleinkas’ that translates to ‘There’s a bull in the china shop’). Porselynnkas was a ground breaking movement, especially in Afrikaans literature and drama. The movement references aspects of Anarchy, Dada and experimental poetry in a way which has never before been seen in a South African context. After the formation of Porselynnkas he changed his name to Sjaka S. Septembir.

The publication of student newspaper Die Matie with Sjaka on the front cover was met with extreme resistance. In a period of two years, Porselynnkas performed 38 Dadaist style Poetry Happenings and edpublish 22 publications under Porselynnkas publishers. Their Afrikaans poetry and performances got them banned in many venues in Stellenbosch, from appearing on the student radio station Radio Matie and booed off stage in Cape Town. The performances made use of abjection and shock value to mock religion and norms around sexuality. The group also performed public executions of Afrikaans icons such as Johan Stemmet, Steve Hofmeyr and Patricia Lewis.

Writer and filmmaker Matthew Kalil made a Porselynnkas documentary called Porselynnkas: Dokiementer, which premiered on 12 June 2011.

== Cybervaseline ==
Sjaka and the artist Asha Zero met in Johannesburg in 1999 and started a collaboration called Cybervaseline. This zine showcased artists such as Swart Steep and Nadine Botha. Cybervaseline was published until the end of 2002 and 18 editions appeared. Only 300 numbered copies of each edition were made.

== Poetry ==
Sjaka writes poetry both in English and Afrikaans.

His poetry was featured in the publication A Look Away.

== Current work ==
Sjaka appeared in Spyt in 2011, written by Ingrid Winterbach. He translated Ouma into English and is taking Red to the National Arts Festival in June 2011.
