= Kagenna Magazine =

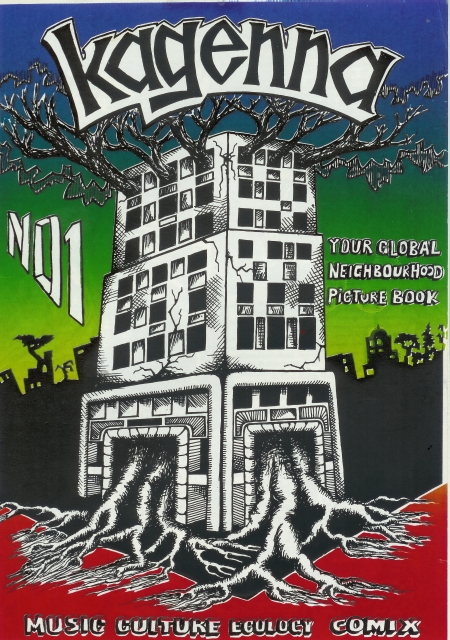
Kagenna Issue One, silkscreened cover by Nat Tardrew

Kagenna is an alternative magazine from South Africa. It started life as an underground zine published shortly after the fall of the Berlin Wall, and grew into an irregular, irreverent and entertaining read at the newsstand. Published in Cape Town, the magazine carried articles by activists, anarchists, ecologists and hackers and was considered subversive and revolutionary for its time. The last issue was published electronically in 1993.

== Origin ==
The name Kagenna derives from "Gehenna", the Jewish Hell, and !Cagn, the mantis god of the !kung San People.

The project started out as a collective experiment in Cape Town after the fall of the Berlin Wall in 1989. Advocating a combination of ecology, art and technology whose offshoots became part of a global technogaian movement. The first issue had a silk-screened cover and was photocopied. Subsequent issues became more sophisticated and the magazine developed a life of its own, spawning other experiments and in particular a thriving small press.

== Contents ==
Kagenna #1 (silk-screened cover) 101 Green things to do; Beyond Environmental Conflict; Women as practical Utopists; Hyperdelic Exploration; Artvark Interview; Garbage Ecology; Ten Key Values of the Green Movement; Jim Jute and the Night People; Tristam and Them comic.(24pp) out of print

Kagenna #2 (silk-screened cover): "Reclaiming Celebration; Busking;Towards a Green South Africa" by Jacklyn Cock; "Dioxin Factsheet"; "Siyabona Theatre"; "The Word Becomes Cassette" by William Levy; "Tristam and Them" comic.(28pp) out of print.

Kagenna #3: "Plastic Propaganda"; "Art and Change"; "Ozone-Friendly Might Just Kill You"; "Global Warming Factsheet"; "Camphill Bus"; "African Hip Hop interview"; "Fax for Freedom"; "Recycling and Toxics guide"; "The Kitchen Revolution"; Beezy Bailey poster. (28pp + poster) R12.50

Kagenna #4: "Do You Have to be White to be Green" by Albie Sachs; "Steve Newman's alternative reality"; "German Green party interview"; "Radical Radio"; "Disrupting Trivia and Tapping the Information Highway"; "The Reality of Meat; Hobos Recycle"; "CO-OP cutup"; "Kwangoma"; P. Clark-Brown poster. (36pp) R13.50 Kagenna #5

Kagenna #5: "Planetary Dance"; "Do Trees Have Rights?" Albie Sachs; "San Survival"; "Eco-Architecture"; "Power Crisis on the Cape Flats"; "Kicking the Automobile Habit"; "25 Difficult things you can do to save the Earth"; "Mike van Graan interview"; "Indigenous Plant users outlawed"; "The Mad-Dogs of the Media", "Justin Wells poster". (40pp)

Kagenna #6: "Cyberpunk by Timothy Leary; Subversive Television; Bleeding by the Moon; Interconnectedness by Mike Cope; "The History of Hemp"; "Permaculture"; "Benjamin Zephaniah interview"; "Street-kid Theatre"; "Tristam and Them" comic; Jane Thompson poster. (40pp)

== Other SA alternative magazines ==
- Vula

== See also ==
- Alternative media in South Africa
- Alternative Press
- Alternative Media
- Underground Press
- Samizdat
- Self publishing
- Counterculture
