= New Nation (South Africa) =

Newspaper

The New Nation was a leading anti-apartheid newspaper, published in South Africa between 1986–1997. It was unique in the period for having black owners and an almost entirely black staff.

The newspaper was published on a weekly basis. It was an initiative of the SA Catholic Bishops Conference and activist-journalist Zwelakhe Sisulu who was the founding editor.

Its early ethos was heavily shaped by liberation theology, and it shone a spotlight on black workers' rights and other aspects of inequality and racism, which led to hostile reactions from the state.

As editor of the weekly newspaper, Sisulu championed the rights of black workers, incurring the hostility of the state.

In 1986 Sisulu was arrested twice, the second arrest led to his imprisonment for two years in solitary confinement, and the newspaper was banned in 1988.

In addition to state repression, the newspaper also had to struggle with financial challenges. Never able to obtain enough advertising to become profitable, New Nation relied on the donations of its supporters. The paper aligned itself with the trade unions as well as the Winnie Mandela grouping within the ANC.

The New Nation only escaped debt in 1995 when it was taken over by Nthato Motlana. Motlana, an anti-apartheid activist and businessman, was also owner of the Sowetan newspaper.

New ownership and a new look proved insufficient to revive the fortunes of the newspaper, whose sales declined to 22,000 in early 1997, at which point its owners decided to cease publishing it. The final edition was published 30 May 1997.
