= Gerhard Haderer =

Austrian cartoonist and caricaturist

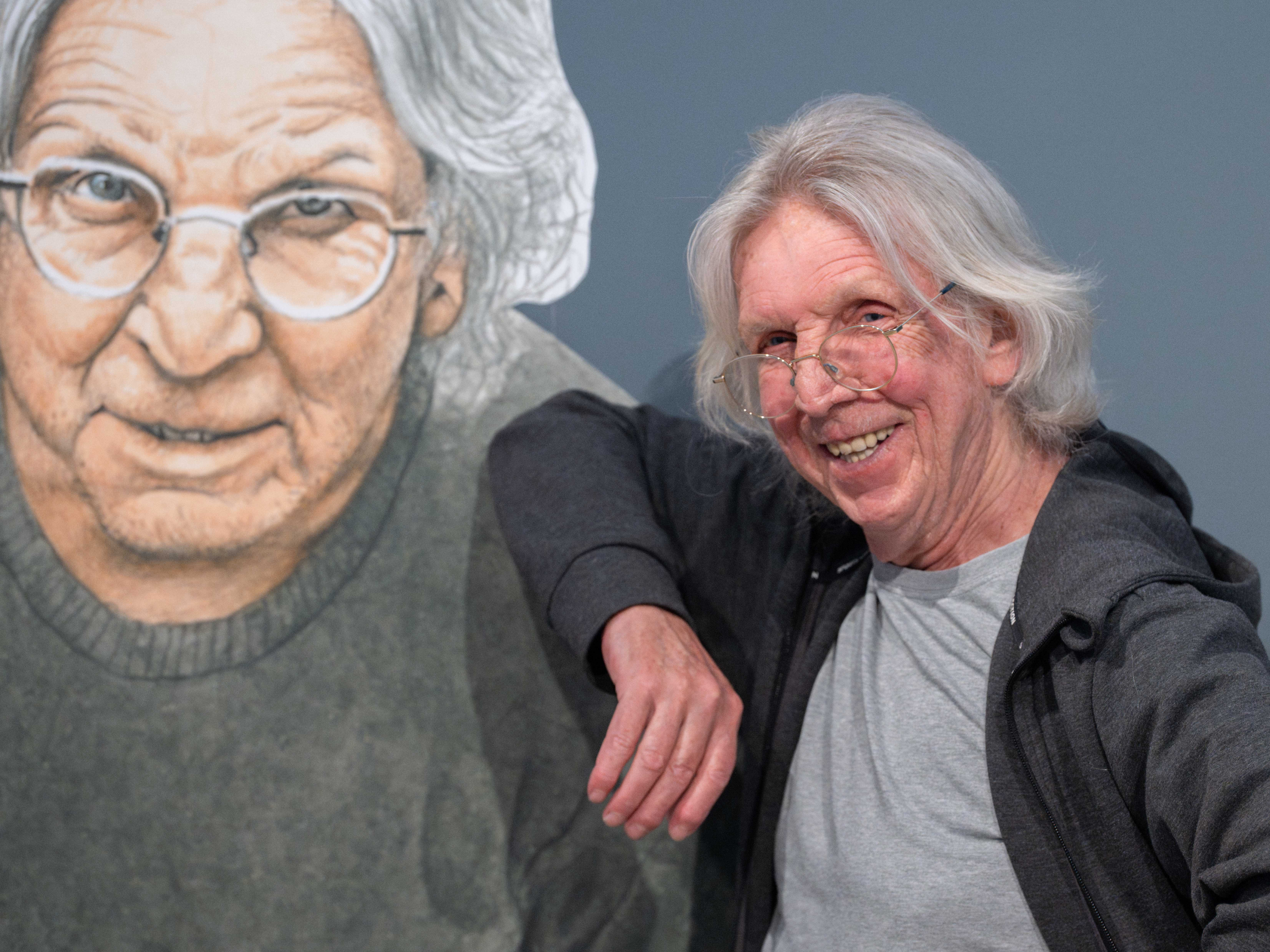
- Gerhard Haderer in 2026
- Born: 1951 (age 74–75); Leonding, Austria
- Occupations: Cartoonist, caricaturist

Gerhard Haderer (German: [ˈhaːdərər]; born 1951) is an Austrian cartoonist and caricaturist. His brother Josef Haderer was a professional footballer.

== Early life ==
Haderer studied at a technical art school in Linz for four years from 1965, and then studied engraving in Stockholm.

== Career ==
He returned to Austria in 1971 and worked as an independent commercial artist and draughtsman. He developed his photo-realistic style working on advertising, illustrations, and even designing maps for the Salzburg tourist board. In 1985, after a cancer operation, he abandoned his commercial career to become a freelance caricaturist and satirical illustrator. His first satirical works appeared in the upper-Austrian magazines "Watzmann", "ORF-Ventil" and "Oberösterreichische Nachrichten". He soon began to appear regularly in the Austrian weekly “Profil" to which he still contributes. His work then began to appear in newspapers and magazines in other German speaking countries. Since 1991 his work has appeared regularly in Germany's "Stern" magazine as “Haderers Wochenschau” ("Haderers weekly news"). From 1997 to 2000, and from 2008 he published his own monthly satirical comics magazine called Moff". He has produced designs for several satirical puppet shows

== Honours ==
- 2001: Deutscher Karikaturenpreis, Geflügelter Bleistift in Gold (German caricature prize, winged pencil in gold)
- 2008: Goldenes Verdienstzeichen des Landes Wien (Golden Merit of Vienna)

== Books ==
- Sehr verehrte Österreicher (1987) ISBN 3-7015-0108-4
- Vorsicht, Aloisia (1989) ISBN 3-7015-0188-2
- Das große Buch vom kleinen Oliver (1991) ISBN 3-85463-109-X
- Haderers Wochenschau (1993) ISBN 3-570-19003-X
- Vorsicht, Haderer! (1994) ISBN 3-7757-0489-2
- Think positive - Die besten Cartoons aus 10 Jahren (1996) ISBN 3-8000-3751-3
- Die letzte Märchenprinzessin (1997) with texts by Elisabeth Menasse, Eva Menasse and Robert Menasse ISBN 978-3-518-40950-3
- Jörgi, der Drachentöter (2000) ISBN 3-8000-3792-0
- Die ersten zehn 10 Jahre im Stern (2001) ISBN 3-8303-3024-3
- Das Leben des Jesus (2002) ISBN 3-8000-3863-3
- Die glorreichen Drei (2003) ISBN 3-8000-7007-3
- Von Hunderln und Menschen (2003) ISBN 3-8000-3912-5
- Alles Liebe (2005) ISBN 3-8000-7100-2
- Alles Essen (2005) ISBN 3-8000-7099-5
- Danke gut (2005) ISBN 3-8000-7104-5
- Apropos Fußball (2006) ISBN 3-8000-7198-3

== Sources ==
- Leidig, Michael (2002-03-27). "'Jesus, the hippy friend of Hendrix' angers Catholics". London: The Telegraph.
- Diver, Krysia (2005-03-23). "Cartoonist faces Greek jail for blasphemy". London: The Guardian.
- "Greek court lifts ban on Jesus cartoon book". The Age. 2005-04-14.
- "European Journalists Begin to Condemn Cartoons". IPS. 2006-02-08. Archived from the original on 2009-08-11.
