= Vula =

South Africa magazine

Vula first appeared in Cape Town in December 1984. Distributed to beach bathers and the like, it quickly became one of the country's top, alternative publications, before disappearing sometime in 1987.

== Other SA Alternative Publications ==
- Kagenna

== See also ==
- Alternative Press
- Alternative Media
- Underground Press
- Samizdat
- Self publishing
