= Htin Lin Oo =

Burmese writer

- ထင်လင်းဦး
- Born: 21 January 1967 (age 59); Burma
- Occupations: Writer; politician
- Political party: National League for Democracy

Htin Lin Oo (Burmese: ထင်လင်းဦး; also spelt Htin Linn Oo; born 21 January 1967) is a Burmese writer and former political prisoner. He previously served as the information officer for the National League for Democracy.

On 23 October 2014, he gave a public speech in Chaung-U Township, where he criticised nationalist Buddhist monks and hardliners of stoking inter-religious tensions in the country. The speech was denounced by Buddhist nationalists, including the Patriotic Buddhist Monks Union. In June 2015, he was sentenced to 2 years of hard labour for defaming religion and 'hurting religious feelings.' His sentencing was condemned by the United Nations Office of the High Commissioner for Human Rights. He was pardoned on 16 April 2016 by President Htin Kyaw.

In the aftermath of the 2021 Myanmar coup d'état, he was detained by the military junta. On 22 February 2022, he was sentenced to three years and was released under a mass pardon in January 2023.
