= Vuyo =

Vuyo is a South African masculine given name that may refer to

- Vuyo Dabula (born 1976), South African actor
- Vuyo Mbotho (born 1988), South African rugby union player
- Vuyo Mbuli (1967–2013), South African television personality and news presenter
- Vuyo Mere (born 1984), South African football defender
