= Varsity (Cape Town) =

University of Cape Town student newspaper

- Type: Student newspaper
- Format: Online; Print
- Founded: 1942
- Headquarters: Level 4 Steve Biko Student Union Building; University of Cape Town
- Website: varsitynewspaper.substack.com

Varsity is the official student newspaper of the University of Cape Town (UCT), printed since 1942.

== History ==
The paper was founded as a result of the burgeoning cultural tensions on campus between Afrikaans and English students. The student representative council (SRC) sought to control these tensions by uniting the English student newspaper UCTattle and the Afrikaans medium publication Die Spantou. The SRC aimed to lessen the widening gap in political opinion advocated by each of these mouthpieces by launching a bilingual student newspaper.

A storm of controversy met the decision to abolish the original papers. The first Varsity constitution even had a clause forbidding comment on politics at UCT. The SRC was firm that "racial friction and political bitterness must be eliminated". The SRC took Varsity Newspaper firmly under its wing, with much indignation from the student body. The first editor, NC Gracie, chose the name claiming UCT had the right to the name "being the oldest [university] with the most inspiring record and the greatest tradition of tolerance and unity".

The newspaper grew in popularity and developed independence from the SRC. The paper maintained a spirit of liberalism during the apartheid years, with successive editors jailed and many editions incensing the National Party government. Varsity provided an important function during the years of censorship since it operated under different constraints to the mainstream press, which were often prevented from reporting on the country's growing liberation struggle.

Many former staffers at Varsity have continued to work in the media industry in South Africa.

== See also ==
- South Africa's alternative press
- List of newspapers in South Africa
- University of Cape Town
