= Die Suid-Afrikaan =

Die Suid-Afrikaan was a progressive Afrikaans-language monthly published in Cape Town.
