= List of acts of the Parliament of Scotland from 1661 =

This is a list of acts of the Parliament of Scotland for the year 1661.

It lists acts of Parliament of the old Parliament of Scotland, that was merged with the old Parliament of England to form the Parliament of Great Britain, by the Union with England Act 1707 (c. 7).

For other years, see list of acts of the Parliament of Scotland. For the period after 1707, see list of acts of the Parliament of Great Britain.

== 1661 ==
The 1st session of the 1st parliament of Charles II, held in Edinburgh from 1 January 1661 until 12 July 1661.

| Short title, or popular name | Citation | Royal assent |
Long title
| Oaths Act 1661 (repealed) | 1661 c. 1 (Note: This is the citation in the Record Edition.); 1661 c. 1 (Note: This is the citation in the Duodecimal Edition.) | 1 January 1661 |
Act constituteing the Chancellour President in all time comeing And for takeing the oath of Parliament. Act constituting the Chancellor as President in all time coming, and for taking the oath in Parliament. (Repealed by Promissory Oaths Act 1871 (34 & 35 Vict. c. 48))
| Not public and general | 1661 c. 2 — (Note: This act is not listed in the Duodecimal Edition.) | 1 January 1661 |
Act concerning Sir Archibald Johnston of Waristoun. Act concerning Sir Archibald Johnston of Wariston.
| Not public and general | 1661 c. 3 — | 1 January 1661 |
Act of exoneration to the Earle Marishall anent the Honors. Act of exoneration to the Earl Marshall regarding the Honours.
| Commission to Lords of Articles Act 1661 (repealed) | 1661 c. 4 — | 8 January 1661 |
Commission to the Lords of the Articles and Processes. Commission to the Lords of the Articles and Processes. (Repealed by Statute Law Revision (Scotland) Act 1906 (6 Edw. 7. c. 38))
| Commission on Trade Act 1661 (repealed) | 1661 c. 5 — | 8 January 1661 |
Commission for trade and complaints. Commission for trade and complaints. (Repealed by Statute Law Revision (Scotland) Act 1906 (6 Edw. 7. c. 38))
| Crown Appointments Act 1661 still in force | 1661 c. 6; 1661 c. 2 | 11 January 1661 |
Act anent the Kingis Majesties prerogative in choiseing and appointing of the Officers of State, Lords of Privy Council and Session. Act regarding the King's Majesty's prerogative in the choosing and appointing of his Officers of State, Lords of the Privy Council and Session.
| Parliament Act 1661 still in force | 1661 c. 7; 1661 c. 3 | 11 January 1661 |
Act anent his Maiesties Prerogative in calling and dissolveing of Parliamentis and makeing of Lawis. Act regarding his Majesty's Prerogative in calling and dissolving of Parliaments, and making of laws.
| Not public and general | 1661 c. 8 — | 11 January 1661 |
Act of exoneration to Major Fletcher concerning the publict Records of this Kingdome. Exoneration to Major Fletcher concerning the public Records of this Kingdom.
| Not public and general | 1661 c. 9 — | 11 January 1661 |
Act of exoneration to Mr John Young concerning the publict Records of this Kingdome. Act of exoneration to Mr John Young concerning the public Records of this Kingdom.
| Not public and general | 1661 c. 10 — | 11 January 1661 |
Act in favours of Christian Fletcher spous of M^{r} James Granger concerning the Honors. Act in favour of Christian Fletcher, spouse to Mr James Granger, concerning the Honours.
| Remonstrators Act 1661 (repealed) | 1661 c. 11 — | 16 January 1661 |
Act and Proclamation against the Remonstrators and for order in the toun of Edinburgh. Act and Proclamation against the Remonstrators and for order in the town of Edinburgh. (Repealed by Statute Law Revision (Scotland) Act 1906 (6 Edw. 7. c. 38))
| King's Prerogative Act 1661 (repealed) | 1661 c. 12; 1661 c. 4 | 16 January 1661 |
Act anent his Majesties prerogative in making of Leagues & the Convention of the Subjects. Act regarding his Majesty's prerogative in making of Leagues and the Convention of the Subjects. (Repealed by Statute Law Revision (Scotland) Act 1964 (c. 80))
| Prerogative Act 1661 still in force | 1661 c. 13; 1661 c. 5 | 16 January 1661 |
Act anent his Maiesties Prerogative in the Militia and in making of Peace and War or treaties and leagues with forraine Princes or Estates. Act regarding his Majesty's Prerogative in the Militia and in making of Peace and War or treaties and leagues with foreign Princes or Estates.
| Not public and general | 1661 c. 14 — | 16 January 1661 |
Act concerning James Viscount of Frendraught. Act concerning James, Viscount of Frendraught.
| Guard for Parliament Act 1661 (repealed) | 1661 c. 15 — | 18 January 1661 |
Act for a guard of Horse to attend the Parliament. Act for a guard of Horse to attend the Parliament. (Repealed by Statute Law Revision (Scotland) Act 1906 (6 Edw. 7. c. 38))
| Not public and general | 1661 c. 16 — | 18 January 1661 |
Act in favour of Sir James Lamont for citing the Marques of Argyll &c. Act in favour of Sir James Lamont for citing the Marquis of Argyll, etc.
| Not public and general | 1661 c. 17 — | 18 January 1661 |
Act in favors of Margaret Campbel relict of Captane Abraham Schokley. Act in favour of Margaret Campbell, widow of Captain Abraham Shockley.
| Repeal Act 1661 (repealed) | 1661 c. 18; 1661 c. 6 | 22 January 1661 |
Act annulling the Convention of Estates 1643 & rescinding any acts ratifieing the same. Act annulling the Convention of Estates of 1643 and rescinding any acts ratifying the same. (Repealed by Statute Law Revision (Scotland) Act 1906 (6 Edw. 7. c. 38))
| Anabaptists Act 1661 (repealed) | 1661 c. 19 — | 22 January 1661 |
Act and Proclamation against the meitings of Anabaptists Quakers &c. Act and Proclamation against the meetings of Anabaptists, Quakers, etc. (Repealed by Statute Law Revision (Scotland) Act 1906 (6 Edw. 7. c. 38))
| Not public and general | 1661 c. 20 — | 22 January 1661 |
Decreit William Earle of Dalhousie &c. against M^{r} Robert Hodge. Decreet of William, Earl of Dalhousie etc. against Mr Robert Hodge.
| Repeal (No. 2) Act 1661 (repealed) | 1661 c. 21 — | 22 January 1661 |
Act rescinding the resolution of a Quære in June 1644. Act rescinding the resolution of a Query in June 1644. (Repealed by Statute Law Revision (Scotland) Act 1906 (6 Edw. 7. c. 38))
| League and Covenant Act 1661 (repealed) | 1661 c. 22; 1661 c. 7 | 25 January 1661 |
Act concerneing the League and Covenant and dischargeing the renewing therof without his Majesties warrand and approbation. Act concerning the League and Covenant, and discharging the renewing thereof without his Majesty's warrant and approbation. (Repealed by Statute Law Revision (Scotland) Act 1906 (6 Edw. 7. c. 38))
| Vacant Stipends Act 1661 (repealed) | 1661 c. 23 — | 25 January 1661 |
Act anent the disposall of vacand Stipends. Act regarding the disposal of vacant Stipends. (Repealed by Statute Law Revision (Scotland) Act 1906 (6 Edw. 7. c. 38))
| Not public and general | 1661 c. 24 — | 25 January 1661 |
Act against M^{r} Patrick Waterstoun a deposed minister. Act against Mr Patrick Waterstone, a deposed minister.
| Not public and general | 1661 c. 25 — | 25 January 1661 |
Act in favors of Hew M_{c}Ron burges of Edinburgh. Act in favour of Hugh MacRone, burgess of Edinburgh.
| Not public and general | 1661 c. 26 — | 25 January 1661 |
Act for Sir Allan M^{c}cleane to choise his curators.
| Not public and general | 1661 c. 27 — | 25 January 1661 |
Act in favours of Adam Hepburn of Trabroun.
| Not public and general | 1661 c. 28 — | 29 January 1661 |
Act appointing a precognition to be taken anent the slauchter of Johne Gordoun.
| Not public and general | 1661 c. 29 — | 29 January 1661 |
Act in favours of Cristian Burne spouse of M^{r} William Wishart, Minister at Kinneill.
| Not public and general | 1661 c. 30 — | 29 January 1661 |
Act in favours of Edward Whalley Citizen of London.
| Not public and general | 1661 c. 31 — | 29 January 1661 |
Act in favours of John Cunynghame of Bedland as Collector to the Shyre of Air.
| Not public and general | 1661 c. 32 — | 29 January 1661 |
Act in favours of the Burgh of Dumbartan.
| Not public and general | 1661 c. 33 — | 29 January 1661 |
Act declaring William Forbes fugitive for the murther of ... Irving of Kincowssie.
| Not public and general | 1661 c. 34 — | 29 January 1661 |
Act in favours of M^{r} James Douglas late Minister at Kirkwall.
| Not public and general | 1661 c. 35 — | 29 January 1661 |
Act in favours of Robert Stuart burges of Linlithgow.
| Not public and general | 1661 c. 36 — | 29 January 1661 |
Act and Commission David Sinclair of Raysay against James Mudie of Melsetter.
| Mass Act 1661 (repealed) | 1661 c. 37; 1661 c. 8 | 1 February 1661 |
Act against saying of Messe seminary and Messe Preists and trafficquing Papists. (Repealed by Statute Law Revision (Scotland) Act 1906 (6 Edw. 7. c. 38))
| Not public and general | 1661 c. 38 — | 1 February 1661 |
Commission to M^{r} John Wilkie for uplifting of the vacand stipends.
| Not public and general | 1661 c. 39 — | 1 February 1661 |
Act George Home of Wedderburne contra Alex^{r} Home &c.
| Not public and general | 1661 c. 40 — | 5 February 1661 |
Act in favours S^{r} Lodovick Stuart.
| Not public and general | 1661 c. 41 — | 5 February 1661 |
Act in favours of M^{r} Bernard Sanderson late Minister of Keir in Nithisdale.
| Not public and general | 1661 c. 42 — | 5 February 1661 |
Act for the liberation of Alex^{r} Ferguson of Kilkerran.
| Not public and general | 1661 c. 43 — | 5 February 1661 |
Act concerning the entertainment in prison of Alex^{r} Campbell of Pennymore.
| Not public and general | 1661 c. 44 — | 5 February 1661 |
Act in favours of the Burgh of Whythorne.
| Not public and general | 1661 c. 45 — | 8 February 1661 |
Act rescinding the forfaltour of James Marques of Montrose.
| Annulling 1649 Parliament Act 1661 (repealed) | 1661 c. 46; 1661 c. 9 | 9 February 1661 |
Act approveing the Engadgment 1648 and annulling the Parliament and Committees 1649. Act approving the Engagement of 1648 and annulling the Parliament of 1649. (Repealed by Statute Law Revision (Scotland) Act 1906 (6 Edw. 7. c. 38))
| Messengers of Arms Act 1661 (repealed) | 1661 c. 47 — | 15 February 1661 |
Act allowing Messingers of Armes to execute Summons of Treason. Act allowing Messengers of Arms to execute Summons of Treason. (Repealed by Statute Law (Repeals) Act 1986 (c. 12))
| Signet Act 1661 (repealed) | 1661 c. 48 — | 15 February 1661 |
Act for opening the Signet. Act for opening the Signet. (Repealed by Statute Law Revision (Scotland) Act 1906 (6 Edw. 7. c. 38))
| Not public and general | 1661 c. 49 — | 15 February 1661 |
Act in favors of Johne Earle of Crafurd and Lindsay.
| Not public and general | 1661 c. 50 — | 15 February 1661 |
Act and Decreit against the Magistrats of Kirkwall.
| Not public and general | 1661 c. 51 — | 15 February 1661 |
Act in favors of Johne Leith of Harthill &c.
| King's Person Act 1661 (repealed) | 1661 c. 52; 1661 c. 10 | 20 February 1661 |
Act condemneing the deliverie of the King. Act condemning the delivery of the King. (Repealed by Statute Law Revision (Scotland) Act 1906 (6 Edw. 7. c. 38))
| Not public and general | 1661 c. 53 — | 20 February 1661 |
Act and Decreet John Aitchison contra Patrick Home of Coldinghamelaw.
| Not public and general | 1661 c. 54 — | 20 February 1661 |
Act anent the Magdalen Bridge neir Mussilburgh.
| Not public and general | 1661 c. 55 — | 20 February 1661 |
Act in favors of Thomas Ker of Mersington.
| Not public and general | 1661 c. 56 — | 22 February 1661 |
Commission for visiting the Universities and Colledges of Aberdein.
| Persons coming from Ireland Act 1661 (repealed) | 1661 c. 57 — | 22 February 1661 |
Act concerning persons comeing from Ireland without a testimony. (Repealed by Statute Law Revision (Scotland) Act 1906 (6 Edw. 7. c. 38))
| Not public and general | 1661 c. 58 — | 22 February 1661 |
Act in favours of the Ladies Elizabeth Marie and Margaret Hamiltouns.
| Not public and general | 1661 c. 59 — | 22 February 1661 |
Act anent the election of the Magistrates of Montrose.
| Not public and general | 1661 c. 60 — | 22 February 1661 |
Act and Decreet in favours of Archibald Lawmont against George Campbell.
| Not public and general | 1661 c. 61 — | 22 February 1661 |
Act in favours of the burgh of Aberdein for upholding the calsays of Cowymonth.
| Oath of Allegiance Act 1661 (repealed) | 1661 c. 62; 1661 c. 11 | 27 February 1661 |
Act anent the oath of alledgeance and acknowledgement of his Majesties prerogative by all publict Ministers. (Repealed by Promissory Oaths Act 1871 (34 & 35 Vict. c. 48))
| Not public and general | 1661 c. 63 — | 27 February 1661 |
Act and Decreit in favours of Johne Earle of Pearth contra Sir George Mowat.
| Not public and general | 1661 c. 64 — | 27 February 1661 |
Act in favours of Mr Alexr Moncreiff minister at Scoony.
| Not public and general | 1661 c. 65 — | 1 March 1661 |
Act in favours of Collonell James Weemes.
| Not public and general | 1661 c. 66 — | 1 March 1661 |
Act in favours of Collonells Lodovick Leslie and James Scot.
| Teind Commission Act 1661 (repealed) | 1661 c. 67; 1661 c. 61 | 6 March 1661 |
Commission for plantation of Kirks and valuation of Teinds. (Repealed by Statute Law Revision (Scotland) Act 1906 (6 Edw. 7. c. 38))
| Not public and general | 1661 c. 68 — | 8 March 1661 |
Act in favours of Robert Spens and others servants of James Viscount of Frendraucht.
| Not public and general | 1661 c. 69 — | 8 March 1661 |
Act in favours of the Burgh of Kirkudbright for holding the Stewart Courts there.
| Not public and general | 1661 c. 70 — | 8 March 1661 |
Act in favours of Hugh Earle of Eglingtoun anent his Curators.
| Not public and general | 1661 c. 71 — | 8 March 1661 |
Act in favours of Halbert Nisbet of Shealls preceptor of S^{t} Nicholas hospipitall in Glasgow.
| Not public and general | 1661 c. 72 — | 8 March 1661 |
Decreit Sir Archibald Stirling of Carden against Robert Lord Burghlie.
| Not public and general | 1661 c. 73 — | 8 March 1661 |
Act in favours of Jonet Edger relict of Quartermaster James Slowan.
| Not public and general | 1661 c. 74 — | 8 March 1661 |
Act anent the Bridge over Clyd at Ramweillcraigs.
| Not public and general | 1661 c. 75 — | 8 March 1661 |
Act in favours of Patrick Gellie prissoner.
| Not public and general | 1661 c. 76 — | 8 March 1661 |
Act in favours of William Moore, Merchant burges of Air.
| Not public and general | 1661 c. 77 — | 8 March 1661 |
Act in favours of Francis Ruthven sonne to the deceast Sir John Ruthven of Dunglas.
| Not public and general | 1661 c. 78 — | 8 March 1661 |
Act in favours of Elizabeth Home spous to M^{r} James Simpson late Minister at Airth.
| Not public and general | 1661 c. 79 — | 8 March 1661 |
Act in favours of M^{r} George Nairne Minister at Burntisland.
| Not public and general | 1661 c. 80 — | 13 March 1661 |
Act in favours of the Magistrats of Wigtoun anent the Bridge callit the Bishopsbridge.
| Not public and general | 1661 c. 81 — | 13 March 1661 |
Act in favours of M^{r} Johne Stirling and M_{r} Robert Traill Ministers at Edinburgh.
| Not public and general | 1661 c. 82 — | 13 March 1661 |
Act and Decreet in favours of Jean Lock hart against John Bonar of Bonartoun her husband.
| Not public and general | 1661 c. 83 — | 13 March 1661 |
Act in favours of M^{r} Patrick Durhame sumtyme Minister at Ardnoseir.
| Not public and general | 1661 c. 84 — | 13 March 1661 |
Act in favours of Jonnet Irving spous to M^{r} Robert Broun sumtyme Minister at Kirkbane.
| Not public and general | 1661 c. 85 — | 13 March 1661 |
Act and Decreet Coline Mckenzie of Ridcastle against Colonell Gilbert Ker and others.
| Not public and general | 1661 c. 86 — | 13 March 1661 |
Act and Decreet in favours of Elizabeth Dutchie in Drumleithie against Henry Dennistoun Merchant burges of Edinburgh.
| Judicial Proceedings Ratified Act 1661 (repealed) | 1661 c. 87; 1661 c. 12 | 15 March 1661 |
Act concerning the Judicial proceidings in the tyme of the late usurpers. (Repealed by Statute Law Revision (Scotland) Act 1906 (6 Edw. 7. c. 38))
| Apparent Heirs Act 1661 (repealed) | 1661 c. 88; 1661 c. 24 | 15 March 1661 |
Act concerning appearand airs their ment of their oun and their predeces sours debts. (Repealed by Succession (Scotland) Act 1964 (c. 41))
| Not public and general | 1661 c. 89 — | 15 March 1661 |
Act and Decreet in favours of James Arbuthnot and others against Henry Denniestoun and others.
| Not public and general | 1661 c. 90 — | 15 March 1661 |
Act in favours of Gideon Murray Merchant in Edinburgh anent the fishing.
| Not public and general | 1661 c. 91 — | 15 March 1661 |
Act in favours of M^{r} Gideon Penman Minister at Crichtoun.
| Tobacco Pipes Act 1661 (repealed) | 1661 c. 92 — | 15 March 1661 |
Act anent the custom and price of tobacco pypes. (Repealed by Statute Law Revision (Scotland) Act 1906 (6 Edw. 7. c. 38))
| Not public and general | 1661 c. 93 — | 20 March 1661 |
Act of exoneration in favours of Johne Weymes skipper concerning the Public Records of the Kingdome.
| Not public and general | 1661 c. 94 — | 20 March 1661 |
Act and Decreet David Carnagie of Craig against Sir Alexander Carnagie of Pittaro.
| Not public and general | 1661 c. 95 — | 20 March 1661 |
Act in favours of Jean Dalmahoy, and Major Francis Forbes her spous.
| Not public and general | 1661 c. 96 — | 20 March 1661 |
Ratification in favours of William Earle of Marishall of the Shirreffship of Aberdeen.
| Not public and general | 1661 c. 97 — | 20 March 1661 |
Ratificatioun in favours of M^{r} Adam Coninghame of Woodhall of the Commissariot of Dumfries.
| Not public and general | 1661 c. 98 — | 20 March 1661 |
Ratification in favours of James Coninghame Commissar clerk of Dumfreis.
| Not public and general | 1661 c. 99 — | 20 March 1661 |
Ratification in favours of the Colledge of new Aberdein.
| Not public and general | 1661 c. 100 — | 20 March 1661 |
Ratification in favours of Sir Johne Wrquhart of Cromertie.
| Not public and general | 1661 c. 101 — | 20 March 1661 |
Ratification in favours of M^{r} Harie Hay of the Commisser Clerkship of Edinburgh.
| Not public and general | 1661 c. 102 — | 20 March 1661 |
Ratification in favours of Johne Ramesay Advocat of his office of the keeping of the General Register of Horneings. &c.
| Not public and general | 1661 c. 103 — | 20 March 1661 |
Ratification in favours of the Burgh of Elgin.
| Not public and general | 1661 c. 104 — | 20 March 1661 |
Ratification in favours of Thomas Manson of the Shireff and Commissar Clerk ship of Sutherland.
| Not public and general | 1661 c. 105 — | 20 March 1661 |
Ratification of the erection of the kirk and paroche of Kinlosse.
| Not public and general | 1661 c. 106 — | 20 March 1661 |
Ratification in favours of Mr Thomas Young of the Commissariot of Berwick.
| Not public and general | 1661 c. 107 — | 20 March 1661 |
Ratification in favours of the Burgh of Findorne.
| Not public and general | 1661 c. 108 — | 20 March 1661 |
Ratification in favours of Adam Wat of the Commissariot of Kirkcudbright.
| Not public and general | 1661 c. 109 — | 20 March 1661 |
Ratification in favours of M^{r} James Nicolson of the Commissariot of Breichen.
| Not public and general | 1661 c. 110 — | 20 March 1661 |
Ratification in favours of John Newall of the Commissar Clerkship of Kirkcudbright.
| Not public and general | 1661 c. 111 — | 20 March 1661 |
Ratification in favours of Henrie Blaikwood of the Commissar Clerkship of Dumblaine.
| Supply Act 1661 (repealed) | 1661 c. 112; 1661 c. 13 | 22 March 1661 |
Act and offer of 40000 pund Sterline to be payed to the Kings Majestie yeerly dureing his lifetyme by this Kingdome. Act and offer of 40,000 pounds Sterling to be paid to the King's Majesty yearly during his lifetime by this Kingdom. (Repealed by Statute Law Revision (Scotland) Act 1906 (6 Edw. 7. c. 38))
| Not public and general | 1661 c. 113 — | 22 March 1661 |
Act anent the Earle of Mortoun and toun of Kirkwall.
| Not public and general | 1661 c. 114 — | 22 March 1661 |
Act and Decreet Walter Stewart son to Sir Archibald Stewart of Blakhall against William Hamilton of Bining.
| Not public and general | 1661 c. 115 — | 22 March 1661 |
Act and Decreet Walter Watson Commissioner for Dumbarton against James Cleilland of Foscan.
| Not public and general | 1661 c. 116 — | 22 March 1661 |
Act and Decreit Burgh of Craill against Robert Aliesone burges of Edinburgh.
| Not public and general | 1661 c. 117 — | 22 March 1661 |
Act in favours of the Burghs of Craill and Kilrynnie anent the fishing.
| Not public and general | 1661 c. 118 — | 22 March 1661 |
Act in favours of the burghs of Anstruther eister and Pittenweyme anent the fishing.
| Not public and general | 1661 c. 119 — | 22 March 1661 |
Ratification in favors of the Burgh of Edinburgh of the Kings works in Leith and other lands.
| Not public and general | 1661 c. 120 — | 22 March 1661 |
Ratification in favors of the Burgh of Edinburgh of the burgh and regalitie of the Cannowgate, Bruchtoun, &.
| Not public and general | 1661 c. 121 — | 22 March 1661 |
Ratification in favors of the Burgh of Edinburgh of the custome of ane marke of each tunne and packe of goodes.
| Not public and general | 1661 c. 122 — | 22 March 1661 |
Ratification in favors of the Burgh of Edinburgh of the customes at the house of the Mure.
| Not public and general | 1661 c. 123 — | 22 March 1661 |
Ratification of his Majesties new charter of confirmation in favors of the Burgh of Edinburgh.
| Not public and general | 1661 c. 124 — | 22 March 1661 |
Act in favors of M^{r} James Daes minister at Ersiltoun..
| Not public and general | 1661 c. 125 — | 22 March 1661 |
Act in favors of Elizabeth Murray relict of umquhile M^{r} Robert Knox minister at Kelso and her Children.
| Rescissory Act 1661 (repealed) | 1661 c. 126; 1661 c. 15 | 28 March 1661 |
Act rescinding and annulling the pretendit Parliaments in the yeers 1640, 1641 &c. Act rescinding and annulling the pretended parliaments in the years 1640, 1641, etc. (Repealed by Statute Law Revision (Scotland) Act 1906 (6 Edw. 7. c. 38))
| Religion and Church Act 1661 (repealed) | 1661 c. 127; 1661 c. 16 | 28 March 1661 |
Act concerning Religion and Church Government. (Repealed by Statute Law Revision (Scotland) Act 1906 (6 Edw. 7. c. 38))
| Supply (No. 2) Act 1661 (repealed) | 1661 c. 128; 1661 c. 14 | 29 March 1661 |
Act for raising the annuitie of 40000 pund Sterling granted to his Majestie. (Repealed by Statute Law Revision (Scotland) Act 1906 (6 Edw. 7. c. 38))
| Not public and general | 1661 c. 129 — | 29 March 1661 |
Act and Commission in favours of James Earle of Queinsberrie and William Lord Drumlanrig his son anent their losses in 1650.
| Not public and general | 1661 c. 130 — | 29 March 1661 |
Act anent the Earle of Pearth and James Lord Drumonds losses.
| Not public and general | 1661 c. 131 — | 3 April 1661 |
Act in favours of Sir Thomas Hamilton of Prestoun concerning the makeing up of his writs that wer brunt.
| Not public and general | 1661 c. 132 — | 3 April 1661 |
Act rescinding the pretended forfaltour of the late George Marques of Huntlie.
| Not public and general | 1661 c. 133 — | 3 April 1661 |
Act rescinding the pretended forfaltour of Angus M^{c}Donald of Largies.
| Not public and general | 1661 c. 134 — | 3 April 1661 |
Act rescinding the pretended forfaltour of Sir George Gordoun of Haddo.
| Not public and general | 1661 c. 135 — | 3 April 1661 |
Recommendation for a voluntar contribution for repairing the harbour of Peterheid.
| Duns Act 1661 (repealed) | 1661 c. 136 — | 3 April 1661 |
Act declareing the toun of Dunce the heid Burgh of the Shirreffdome of Berwick. (Repealed by Statute Law Revision (Scotland) Act 1906 (6 Edw. 7. c. 38))
| Not public and general | 1661 c. 137 — | 3 April 1661 |
Act in favours of Robert Rollo and Johne Wilson Merchants in Dundie anent the fishing.
| Not public and general | 1661 c. 138 — | 3 April 1661 |
Act and decreit in favours of George Murray son to the deceast Patrick Lord Elibank against William Earle of Lothian.
| Not public and general | 1661 c. 139 — | 3 April 1661 |
Act in favors of Robert Ferguson of Craigdaroch anent the Bridge neir Minnihyve.
| Not public and general | 1661 c. 140 — | 3 April 1661 |
Act and Decreet in favours of John Murray of Polmais against Alexander Crafford of Manuelmilne.
| Not public and general | 1661 c. 141 — | 3 April 1661 |
Act in favors of M^{r} Patrick Durhame late minister at Ardnaseir.
| Not public and general | 1661 c. 142 — | 3 April 1661 |
Act in favors of M^{r} William Wishart, Minister at Kinneill.
| Not public and general | 1661 c. 143 — | 3 April 1661 |
Act in favours of M^{r} Johne Halyburton Minister at Roxburgh.
| Not public and general | 1661 c. 144 — | 3 April 1661 |
Ratification of John Earle of Mars infeftment in the office of Governor of the Castle of Stirline &c.
| Not public and general | 1661 c. 145 — | 3 April 1661 |
Ratification in favours of the Burgh of Nairne.
| Not public and general | 1661 c. 146 — | 3 April 1661 |
Ratification in favours of Patrick Earle of Panmure.
| Not public and general | 1661 c. 147 — | 3 April 1661 |
Ratification in favours of the burgh of Invernes.
| Not public and general | 1661 c. 148 — | 3 April 1661 |
Ratification in favours of George Earle of Linlithgow of the office of Constabularie and keeping of the palace of Linlithgow &c.
| Not public and general | 1661 c. 149 — | 3 April 1661 |
Ratification in favors of James Earle of Calander of the Shireffship of Stirling &c.
| Not public and general | 1661 c. 150 — | 3 April 1661 |
Ratification in favors of the Toun of Mussilburgh.
| Not public and general | 1661 c. 151 | 3 April 1661 |
Ratification in favors of Robert Thomson of the Clerkship of the Stewartrie of Fyffe.
| Not public and general | 1661 c. 152 | 3 April 1661 |
Ratification in favors of M^{r} Thomas Murray advocat of the Commissariot of Caithnes.
| Not public and general | 1661 c. 153 | 3 April 1661 |
Ratification in favors of M^{r} Johne Finlay of the office of Procurator fiscall of the Commissariot of Edinburgh.
| Not public and general | 1661 c. 154 | 3 April 1661 |
Ratification in favors of M^{r} George Mckenzie Advocat of the office of Justice deput.
| Not public and general | 1661 c. 155 | 3 April 1661 |
Ratification in favors of the Burgh of Wigtoun.
| Not public and general | 1661 c. 156 | 3 April 1661 |
Ratification in favors of the Village of Bouden.
| Royal Burghs Act 1661 (repealed) | 1661 c. 157 | 3 April 1661 |
Ratification in favours of the Royal Burrowes of Scotland. (Repealed by Statute Law Revision (Scotland) Act 1906 (6 Edw. 7. c. 38))
| Not public and general | 1661 c. 158 | 3 April 1661 |
Ratification in favours of David Earle of Weyms &c.
| Not public and general | 1661 c. 159 | 3 April 1661 |
Ratification in favors of the Burgh of Kirkcaldie.
| Not public and general | 1661 c. 160 | 5 April 1661 |
Act anent the division of the Shire of Rosse from Inverness.
| Not public and general | 1661 c. 161 | 5 April 1661 |
Commission of Justiciarie for the fishings upon the water of Wgie to William Earle Marishall.
| Not public and general | 1661 c. 162 | 5 April 1661 |
Commission of Justiciarie for the fishings upon the water of Ythan to S_{r} Johne Forbes of Watertoun.
| Not public and general | 1661 c. 163 | 5 April 1661 |
Act in favours of James Weems Generall of Artilliarie and Collonells Ludoweik Leslie and James Scot.
| Not public and general | 1661 c. 164 | 5 April 1661 |
Act in favors M^{r} Robert Campbell minister at the kirk of Yla.
| Not public and general | 1661 c. 165 | 9 April 1661 |
Act and Decreit in favours of William Murray of Longharmistoun against the aires & executors of Marie Countes of Buccleugh.
| Not public and general | 1661 c. 166 | 9 April 1661 |
Act and Decreet in favors of Alison Kellie daughter to the deceast James Kellie of Swanfield against Patrick Home of the Law &c.
| Education Act 1661 (repealed) | 1661 c. 167 | 9 April 1661 |
Act anent the poore Schoolers in Argyle. Act regarding the poor scholars in Argyll. (Repealed by Statute Law Revision (Scotland) Act 1906 (6 Edw. 7. c. 38))
| Not public and general | 1661 c. 168 | 9 April 1661 |
Act in favours of Alexander Keith of Ludwharne.
| Not public and general | 1661 c. 169 | 9 April 1661 |
Act in favours of Johne Earle of Lauderdale anent the superioritie of Mussilburgh.
| Not public and general | 1661 c. 170 | 9 April 1661 |
Act in favours of Johne Earle of Lauder daill Lord Secretary.
| Not public and general | 1661 c. 171 | 9 April 1661 |
Act in favours of Johne Earle of Lauderdale his Majesties Secretaire anent the makeing up of his writts &c.
| Not public and general | 1661 c. 172 | 9 April 1661 |
Act and Decreet in favours of Kenneth Earl of Seaforth against Laurence Dundas in Breichen.
| Not public and general | 1661 c. 173 | 10 April 1661 |
Act against the Earle of Cassills for refuising to take the oath of alledgeance.
| Not public and general | 1661 c. 174 | 12 April 1661 |
Act in favours of Sir James Halket of Pitfirren and Sir David Charmichaell of Balmadie anent the light of the yland of May.
| Not public and general | 1661 c. 175 | 13 April 1661 |
Act rescinding the pretended forfaltour of Æneas Lord M^{c}Donnell.
| Not public and general | 1661 c. 176 | 13 April 1661 |
Act rescinding the pretended forfaltour of Murdo M^{c}Lean of Lochbuy.
| Not public and general | 1661 c. 177 | 13 April 1661 |
Act rescinding the pretended forfaltour of Hector McClean of Kingairloch.
| Not public and general | 1661 c. 178 | 13 April 1661 |
Act and Dispensation in favours of Anna Sinclair daughter of George Sinclair Chirurgian for choising of her Curators.
| Not public and general | 1661 c. 179 | 13 April 1661 |
Act and Remit in favours of George Hay of Kirklands Collector for the Shire of Pearth.
| Not public and general | 1661 c. 180 | 13 April 1661 |
Act and Decreet in favours of Sir Alexander Gibson of Durie knight against William Duik of Hamilton.
| Not public and general | 1661 c. 181 | 16 April 1661 |
Act and Decreet in favours of James Earle of Southesk and Robert Lord Burghlie against the Shire of Fyffe.
| Not public and general | 1661 c. 182 | 16 April 1661 |
Act and Decreit in favours of James Marques of Montrose against Archibald Marques of Argyll.
| Not public and general | 1661 c. 183 | 19 April 1661 |
Act and Decreit in favours of Johne Lord Herreis against John Levingstoun Merchant burges of Edinburgh.
| Not public and general | 1661 c. 184 | 19 April 1661 |
Act Mathew Cumeing Merchant in Glasgow & John & Ninian Andersons Merchants there.
| Not public and general | 1661 c. 185 | 19 April 1661 |
Act and Decreit in favours of Johne Lamb Merchant in Elgin against David Alexander and William Mures.
| Not public and general | 1661 c. 186 | 19 April 1661 |
Act for liberating the Burgh of Aberdeen from payment of the debts of the Viscount of Frendraught.
| Not public and general | 1661 c. 187 | 19 April 1661 |
Act anent fairs and markets in the Burgh of Strathaven.
| Not public and general | 1661 c. 188 | 22 April 1661 |
Act authorising Patrick Dumbar to exerce the office of Sheriff of Elgin and Forres during the minority of the heritable Shireff.
| Not public and general | 1661 c. 189 | 22 April 1661 |
Act in favours of Johne Earle of Rothes for certain fairs in the toun of Leslie.
| Not public and general | 1661 c. 190 | 22 April 1661 |
Act in favours of William Ferquharson of Inverray for certain fairs and markets at the toun of Tullich.
| Not public and general | 1661 c. 191 | 22 April 1661 |
Act in favours of William Earl of Marishall for a fair at Auld Deir.
| Not public and general | 1661 c. 192 | 22 April 1661 |
Act and Decreit in favours of Thomas M^{c}Kenzie of Pluscardin against M^{c}achan, M^{c}gilreoch M^{c}alaster and others
| Not public and general | 1661 c. 193 | 22 April 1661 |
Act and Decreet Thomas M^{c}Kenzie of Pluscarden against Dougall M^{c}Pherson of Powrie.
| Sittings of Session Act 1661 (repealed) | 1661 c. 194 | 26 April 1661 |
Act anent the dounsitting of the Session and opening the Signet. Act regarding the sitting of the Session and opening the Signet. (Repealed by Statute Law Revision (Scotland) Act 1906 (6 Edw. 7. c. 38))
| Clan Gregor Act 1661 (repealed) | 1661 c. 195 | 26 April 1661 |
Act in favors of the Clangregor. Act in favour of the Clan Gregor. (Repealed by Justiciary Act 1693 (c. 62))
| Not public and general | 1661 c. 196 | 26 April 1661 |
Act and Protection in favours of Margaret Bisset relict of Andrew Reid Merchant burges of Perth. Act in favour of Margaret Bisset, widew of Andrew Reid, Merchant burgess of Perth.
| Not public and general | 1661 c. 197 | 26 April 1661 |
Act and Decreit in favours of William Earle of Roxburgh against William Earle of Lothian anent the title of Lord Ker.
| Not public and general | 1661 c. 198 | 26 April 1661 |
Act and Decreit in favours of Collonell Sr James Turner against James Cochrane in Air.
| Sittings of Session (No. 2) Act 1661 (repealed) | 1661 c. 199 | 26 April 1661 |
Act anent the sitting of the Session. Act regarding the sitting of the Session. (Repealed by Statute Law Revision (Scotland) Act 1906 (6 Edw. 7. c. 38))
| Not public and general | 1661 c. 200 | 3 May 1681 |
Act and Decreet in favours of James Earle of Airlie against Johne M^{c}Intosh alias M^{c}Comie of Forthar.
| Not public and general | 1661 c. 201 | 3 May 1681 |
Act and Remit James Earle of Airlie against John McIntosh alias M_{c}Comie of Forther.
| Not public and general | 1661 c. 202 | 3 May 1681 |
Act in favours of the Burgh of Sanquhar anent the Bridge of Sanquhar.
| Not public and general | 1661 c. 203 | 3 May 1681 |
Act in favours of the toun of Mussilburgh anent the fishing.
| Not public and general | 1661 c. 204 | 3 May 1681 |
Act in favours of the toun of Hamiltoun for two fairs and a weekly market.
| Not public and general | 1661 c. 205 | 3 May 1681 |
Commission for trying certain persons in the paroche of Saltprestoun for the eryme of Witchcraft.
| Not public and general | 1661 c. 206 | 9 May 1681 |
Act rescinding the pretended forfaltour of David Graham of Gorthie.
| Not public and general | 1661 c. 207 | 9 May 1681 |
Act in favors of Thomas Gleg Doctor of Medecine thrid master of St Salvators Colledge in S^{t} Andrews.
| Not public and general | 1661 c. 208 | 9 May 1681 |
Act for disposall of the vacand stipend of the paroche of Newbotle.
| Not public and general | 1661 c. 209 | 9 May 1681 |
Act and Warrand for an allowance out of the vacand Stipends to certain Regents of his Majesties Colledge of Old Aberdein.
| Thanksgiving Act 1661 (repealed) | 1661 c. 210; 1661 c. 17 | 13 May 1681 |
Act for a solemne anniversarie thanksgiveing for his Majesties restitution to his Royall Government &c. Act for a solemn anniversary thanksgiving for his Majesty's restitution to his Royal Government, etc. (Repealed by Repeal (No. 2) Act 1690 (c. 58))
| Precedence Act 1661 still in force | 1661 c. 211 | 14 May 1681 |
Act anent the precedencie of the President of the Session, the Lord Register, the Lord Advocat and Thesaurer Deput. Act regarding the precedency of the President of the Session, the Lord Register, the Lord Advocate and Treasurer Depute.
| Not public and general | 1661 c. 212 | 14 May 1681 |
Act anent the uplifting of the late Marques of Huntlies rents. Act regarding the uplifting of the late Marquis of Huntly's rents.
| Not public and general | 1661 c. 213 | 15 May 1681 |
Act in favors of the Burgh of Annan. Act in favour of the Burgh of Annan.
| Not public and general | 1661 c. 214 | 15 May 1681 |
Act in favours of the Burgh of Annan anent changeing of their mercat day and appointing tuo new fairs therin yeerly. Act in favour of the Burgh of Annan regarding changing of their market day and appointing two new fairs therein annually.
| Cursing and Beating Parents Act 1661 | 1661 c. 215; 1661 c. 20 | 16 May 1681 |
Act against curseing and beating of Parents. Act against cursing and beating of Parents.
| Blasphemy Act 1661 (repealed) | 1661 c. 216; 1661 c. 21 | 16 May 1681 |
Act against the cryme of Blasphemie. Act against the crime of Blasphemy. (Repealed by Doctrine of the Trinity Act 1813 (53 Geo. 3. c. 160))
| Homicide Act 1661 (repealed) | 1661 c. 217; 1661 c. 22 | 16 May 1681 |
Act anent the severall degrees of casuall homicide. Act regarding the several degrees of casual homicide. (Repealed by Statute Law Revision (Scotland) Act 1906 (6 Edw. 7. c. 38))
| Poinding Act 1661 (repealed) | 1661 c. 218; 1661 c. 29 | 16 May 1681 |
Act anent execution of poinding to follow upon Shirreffs Commissers and inferior Judges decreits. Act regarding execution of poinding to follow upon Sheriffs', Commissaries', and inferior Judges' decreets. (Repealed by Debtors (Scotland) Act 1987 (c. 18))
| Soapworks Act 1661 (repealed) | 1661 c. 219; 1661 c. 48 | 16 May 1681 |
Act anent the priveledge of Soapworks. Act regarding the privilege of Soapworks. (Repealed by Statute Law Revision (Scotland) Act 1906 (6 Edw. 7. c. 38))
| Not public and general | 1661 c. 220 | 16 May 1681 |
Act rescinding the pretended forfaltour of Johne Lord Herreis.
| Not public and general | 1661 c. 219 | 17 May 1681 |
Act and Decreet in favours of James Wood younger of Grange against George Bruce of Colpmalundie and others.
| Not public and general | 1661 c. 220 | 17 May 1681 |
Act and Decreet in favours of Sir Archibald Stirline of Carden knight Sir James Melvill of Halhill kuight.
| Not public and general | 1661 c. 221 | 20 May 1681 |
Ratification in favours of William Earle of Roxburgh of his infeftments of Cesfoord &c.
| Not public and general | 1661 c. 222 | 20 May 1681 |
Ratification in favors of the universitie of St Andrews of their right of the Archbishoprick and Priorie of S^{t} Andrews.
| Not public and general | 1661 c. 223 | 20 May 1681 |
Ratification of a Decreet of the Lords of Council and Session ordaining the Commisser of Lauder to hold his Courts in the Burgh of Lauder.
| Not public and general | 1661 c. 224 | 20 May 1681 |
Ratification in favours of Major David Ramesay of the Commissariot of the Yles.
| Not public and general | 1661 c. 225 | 20 May 1681 |
Ratification in favours of John Riddell of Hayning of the contract of alienation betuixt him and the burgh of Selkirk.
| Not public and general | 1661 c. 226 | 20 May 1681 |
Ratification in favours of Johne Stirline of Orcherfeild of the Commissariot of Wigtoun.
| Not public and general | 1661 c. 227 | 20 May 1681 |
Ratification in favours of Alexander Earl of Leven of the Lordship and Barony of Balgony.
| Not public and general | 1661 c. 228 | 20 May 1681 |
Ratification in favours of John Campbell of Ardchattan of the manner place of Ardchattan.
| Not public and general | 1661 c. 229 | 20 May 1681 |
Ratification in favours of the Burgh of Linlithgow of their Charters and Infeftments.
| Not public and general | 1661 c. 230 | 20 May 1681 |
Ratification in favours of the City and University of old Aberdein of their rights and priveledges.
| Not public and general | 1661 c. 231 | 20 May 1681 |
Ratification in favours of the Hospitall of Largo and Grammer school at Drummeldrie of the Mortifications made be John Wood esquire.
| Not public and general | 1661 c. 232 | 20 May 1681 |
Ratification in favours of Sir John Forbes of Monymusk of the Barony of Monymusk.
| Not public and general | 1661 c. 233 | 20 May 1681 |
Ratification in favours of the Burgh of Cromertie of their rights and liberties according to their Charters &c.
| Not public and general | 1661 c. 234 | 20 May 1681 |
Ratification in favours of the Burgh of Dumbartan of their liberties and rights.
| Not public and general | 1661 c. 235 | 20 May 1681 |
Ratification in favours of the Burgh of Glasgow of their rights and liberties.
| Not public and general | 1661 c. 236 | 20 May 1681 |
Ratification in favours of the Burgh of Fortrose of their charters and infeftments.
| Not public and general | 1661 c. 237 | 20 May 1681 |
Ratification in favours of the Officers his Majesties Minthouse.
| Excommunication Act 1661 (repealed) | 1661 c. 238; 1661 c. 25 | 22 May 1681 |
Act for denunceing of Excommunicat persons. (Repealed by Repeal (No. 2) Act 1690 (c. 58))
| Restoration of Stolen Goods Act 1661 (repealed) | 1661 c. 239; 1661 c. 26 | 22 May 1681 |
Act appointing the pursuer of the thieff to have the goods stollen from him restored. (Repealed by Statute Law Revision (Scotland) Act 1964 (c. 80))
| Pardon Act 1661 (repealed) | 1661 c. 240; 1661 c. 27 | 22 May 1681 |
Act for the pardon of penal statuts. (Repealed by Statute Law Revision (Scotland) Act 1906 (6 Edw. 7. c. 38))
| Quots Act 1661 (repealed) | 1661 c. 241; 1661 c. 28 | 22 May 1681 |
Act discharging the Quots of Testaments. (Repealed by Statute Law Revision (Scotland) Act 1906 (6 Edw. 7. c. 38))
| Feuars of Church Lands Act 1661 (repealed) | 1661 c. 242; 1661 c. 30 | 22 May 1681 |
Act anent the fewars and vassalls of Kirklands. (Repealed by Statute Law Revision (Scotland) Act 1906 (6 Edw. 7. c. 38))
| Registration Act 1661 (repealed) | 1661 c. 243; 1661 c. 31 | 22 May 1681 |
Act concerning the Registration of Compriseings. (Repealed by Abolition of Feudal Tenure etc. (Scotland) Act 2000 (asp 5))
| Bonds Act 1661 still in force | 1661 c. 244; 1661 c. 32 | 22 May 1681 |
Act concerning heretable and moveable Bands.
| Salmon Act 1661 (repealed) | 1661 c. 245; 1661 c. 33 | 22 May 1681 |
Act for the right packing of Salmond. (Repealed by Statute Law Revision (Scotland) Act 1906 (6 Edw. 7. c. 38))
| Clandestine Marriages Act 1661 (repealed) | 1661 c. 246; 1661 c. 27 | 22 May 1681 |
Act against clandestine and unlawful Marriages. (Repealed by Statute Law Revision (Scotland) Act 1964 (c. 80))
| Redemptions Act 1661 (repealed) | 1661 c. 247 | 22 May 1681 |
Act anent the redemption of the fee of lands granted under reversion from the aires and asignayes of the fiars. (Repealed by Title Conditions (Scotland) Act 2003 (asp 9))
| Not public and general | 1661 c. 248 | 22 May 1681 |
Act rescinding the pretended forfaltour of Sr Robert Spotiswood of Newabbay.
| Not public and general | 1661 c. 249 | 22 May 1681 |
Act rescinding the pretended forfaltour of Collonell M^{c}gillespick and Archibald M^{c}donell of Colinsay his son.
| Not public and general | 1661 c. 250 | 22 May 1681 |
Act rescinding the pretended forfaltour of Archibald M^{c}Donnell of Sandy.
| Not public and general | 1661 c. 251 | 22 May 1681 |
Commission to James Earle of Callander anent the prisoners in Stirling.
| Not public and general | 1661 c. 252 | 24 May 1681 |
Prorogation of the act of precognition in favours of the Lord Bamff &c. anent the slaughter of Johne Gordoun.
| Parliamentary Elections Act 1661 (repealed) | 1661 c. 253; 1661 c. 35 | 30 May 1681 |
Act concerning the election and charges of the Commissioners from the Shires to the Parliament. (Repealed by Statute Law Revision (Scotland) Act 1906 (6 Edw. 7. c. 38))
| Payment of Members Act 1661 (repealed) | 1661 c. 254 | 30 May 1681 |
Act anent an allowance to the Commissioners to the Parliament in the yeer 1648. (Repealed by Statute Law Revision (Scotland) Act 1906 (6 Edw. 7. c. 38))
| Oath of Allegiance (No. 2) Act 1661 (repealed) | 1661 c. 255 | 30 May 1681 |
Act anent the oath of Alledgeance &c. to be taken by Magistrats and Councill within Burgh. (Repealed by Statute Law Revision (Scotland) Act 1906 (6 Edw. 7. c. 38))
| Not public and general | 1661 c. 256 | 30 May 1681 |
Act and Decreet in favours of William Lord Cochrane against the Executors of the deceast Earl of Buccleuch &c.
| Not public and general | 1661 c. 257 | 30 May 1681 |
Act and Decreit in favours of James Lord Forrester against Leivtennent Collonell William Osburne.
| Not public and general | 1661 c. 258 | 30 May 1681 |
Act in favours of Mr Hew Archibald Minister at Evandale.
| Not public and general | 1661 c. 259 | 30 May 1681 |
Act in favours of the Burgh of Rutherglen for tuo fairs yeerlie.
| College of Justice Act 1661 (repealed) | 1661 c. 260; 1661 c. 23 | 4 June 1661 |
Act ratifieing the priveledges of Colledge of Justice. (Repealed by Statute Law Revision (Scotland) Act 1906 (6 Edw. 7. c. 38))
| Redemption in Reversions Act 1661 (repealed) | 1661 c. 261 | 4 June 1661 |
Act explaneing the extent of ane former act anent redemption of the fie lands. (Repealed by Statute Law Revision (Scotland) Act 1906 (6 Edw. 7. c. 38))
| Not public and general | 1661 c. 262 | 4 June 1661 |
Act and Recommendation in favours of James and Andrew Glens Merchants in Linlithgow.
| Not public and general | 1661 c. 263 | 4 June 1661 |
Act in favours of Ritchard Murray of Bruchtoun for an imposition for building and upholding a bridge upon the water of Fleet.
| Not public and general | 1661 c. 264 | 4 June 1661 |
Act and Decreit in favours of Jeane Countes of Annandale against the tennents and occupyers of the tuentie pund land of Lochmaben.
| Ministers' Stipends in Edinburgh Act 1661 (repealed) | 1661 c. 265 | 6 June 1661 |
Act anent the annuitie to be uplifted within the Burgh of Edinburgh for Ministers stipends. (Repealed by Statute Law Revision (Scotland) Act 1906 (6 Edw. 7. c. 38))
| Not public and general | 1661 c. 266 | 6 June 1661 |
Act and Ratification in favours of the Burgh of Edinburgh anent an imposi tion upon wyne beir and ale.
| Not public and general | 1661 c. 267 | 7 June 1661 |
Act and Commissione for trying certain complaints against the regulators of the assessments in the Shyre of Caithness during the late Usurpation.
| Not public and general | 1661 c. 268 | 7 June 1661 |
Act and Commission anent the valuation of the Shire of Caithnes.
| Not public and general | 1661 c. 269 | 7 June 1661 |
Act and Decreit in favours of William Duke of Hammiltoun against James Campbell of Ardkinglas and others.
| Lords of Session Act 1661 (repealed) | 1661 c. 270; 1661 c. 50 | 12 June 1661 |
Act and offer of 12000 pund Sterline to the Lords of Session. (Repealed by Statute Law Revision (Scotland) Act 1906 (6 Edw. 7. c. 38))
| Lords of Session (No. 2) Act 1661 (repealed) | 1661 c. 271 | 12 June 1661 |
Act anent ane augmentation to the rents of the Lords of Session. (Repealed by Statute Law Revision (Scotland) Act 1906 (6 Edw. 7. c. 38))
| Bullion Act 1661 (repealed) | 1661 c. 272; 1661 c. 37 | 12 June 1661 |
Act concerning Bullion. (Repealed by Statute Law Revision (Scotland) Act 1906 (6 Edw. 7. c. 38))
| Coinage Act 1661 (repealed) | 1661 c. 273 | 12 June 1661 |
Act for the coyning of Copper money. (Repealed by Statute Law Revision (Scotland) Act 1906 (6 Edw. 7. c. 38))
| Mint Act 1661 (repealed) | 1661 c. 274 | 12 June 1661 |
Act for provydeing a stock for the Mint house. (Repealed by Statute Law Revision (Scotland) Act 1906 (6 Edw. 7. c. 38))
| Linen Companies Act 1661 (repealed) | 1661 c. 275; 1661 c. 42 | 12 June 1661 |
Act establishing Companies and Societies for makeing lining cloth stuffs &c. (Repealed by Statute Law Revision (Scotland) Act 1906 (6 Edw. 7. c. 38))
| Linen Act 1661 (repealed) | 1661 c. 276; 1661 c. 43 | 12 June 1661 |
Act dischargeing the exportation of lining yearne and regulateing the breadth of lining cloath &c. (Repealed by Statute Law Revision (Scotland) Act 1906 (6 Edw. 7. c. 38))
| Shipping Act 1661 (repealed) | 1661 c. 277; 1661 c. 44 | 12 June 1661 |
Act for encourageing of Shiping and Navigation. (Repealed by Statute Law Revision (Scotland) Act 1906 (6 Edw. 7. c. 38))
| Hides Act 1661 (repealed) | 1661 c. 278; 1661 c. 45 | 12 June 1661 |
Act dischargeing the exportation of Skines hyds &c. (Repealed by Statute Law Revision (Scotland) Act 1906 (6 Edw. 7. c. 38))
| Fishings Act 1661 (repealed) | 1661 c. 279; 1661 c. 39 | 12 June 1661 |
Act for the Fishings and erecting of companies for promoteing the same. (Repealed by Statute Law Revision (Scotland) Act 1906 (6 Edw. 7. c. 38))
| Manufactories Act 1661 (repealed) | 1661 c. 280; 1661 c. 40 | 12 June 1661 |
Act for erecting of Manufactories. (Repealed by Forestalling, Regrating, etc. Act 1844 (7 & 8 Vict. c. 24))
| Sunday Act 1661 (repealed) | 1661 c. 281; 1661 c. 18 | 12 June 1661 |
Act for the due observation of the Sabboth day. (Repealed by Statute Law (Repeals) Act 1989 (c. 43))
| Swearing and Drinking Act 1661 (repealed) | 1661 c. 282; 1661 c. 19 | 12 June 1661 |
Act against sueareing and excessive drinking. (Repealed by Statute Law Revision (Scotland) Act 1906 (6 Edw. 7. c. 38))
| Arrestments Act 1661 still in force | 1661 c. 283; 1661 c. 51 | 12 June 1661 |
Act anent Arreistments.
| March Dykes Act 1661 still in force | 1661 c. 284; 1661 c. 41 | 13 June 1661 |
Act for planting and incloseing of ground.
| Not public and general | 1661 c. 285 | 13 June 1661 |
Act and Decreit in favours of Sir John Leslie of Newtoun against James Hopburne of Menstrie.
| Not public and general | 1661 c. 286 | 13 June 1661 |
Act in favours of Mr William Shaw Mi nister at Garrell.
| Not public and general | 1661 c. 287 | 13 June 1661 |
Act in favours of Leivtennent Collonell Hill for payment to him of money advanced for the subsistance of tuo Ministers and a schoolmaster in Lochaber.
| Not public and general | 1661 c. 288 | 14 June 1661 |
Commission for trying Johne Oliver and William Fletcher two theives.
| Not public and general | 1661 c. 289 | 14 June 1661 |
Act and Decreit in favours of Sir Mungo Murray against Coline Campbell of Morchester.
| Not public and general | 1661 c. 290 | 14 June 1661 |
Act and Commission for auditing the ac counts between Johne Forbes of Tulligony farmer of the Excise of ale &c. for Aberdeen and Banff and Steven Turner.
| Presentation of Ministers Act 1661 (repealed) | 1661 c. 291; 1661 c. 36 | 18 June 1661 |
Act anent presentation of Ministers. (Repealed by Statute Law Revision (Scotland) Act 1906 (6 Edw. 7. c. 38))
| Council for Trade Act 1661 (repealed) | 1661 c. 292 | 18 June 1661 |
Act appointing a Councill for Trade. (Repealed by Statute Law Revision (Scotland) Act 1906 (6 Edw. 7. c. 38))
| Not public and general | 1661 c. 293 | 18 June 1661 |
Act and Decreit in favours of James Earle of Callander against the Earl of Leven anent their precedencie.
| Not public and general | 1661 c. 294 | 18 June 1661 |
Act in favours of Major Edward Lun anent the makeing of Neidles.
| Not public and general | 1661 c. 295 | 18 June 1661 |
Act in favours of Mr George Home late Minister at Aitoun.
| Signet (No. 2) Act 1661 (repealed) | 1661 c. 296 | 21 June 1661 |
Act explaneing the extent of the act (Note: Signet Act 1661 (c. 48)) anent the opening of the Signet. (Repealed by Statute Law Revision (Scotland) Act 1906 (6 Edw. 7. c. 38))
| Not public and general | 1661 c. 297 | 21 June 1661 |
Act in favours of John Lord Rae and others anent the last valuations for assesment.
| Not public and general | 1661 c. 298 | 21 June 1661 |
Act in favours of Sr Andrew Ramesay for changing the hie way of Abbotshall.
| Not public and general | 1661 c. 299 | 21 June 1661 |
Act in favours of William Purves.
| Not public and general | 1661 c. 300 | 21 June 1661 |
Act in favours of James Cockburne of Ryselaw for choiseing of new Curators.
| Not public and general | 1661 c. 301 | 25 June 1661 |
Act and Decreit in favours of Mungo Murray Pursevant against Donnald Miller.
| Not public and general | 1661 c. 302 | 25 June 1661 |
Act and Decreit in favours of Sir William Baillie of Lamington against Henry Whallie Judge Advocat to the Usurpers.
| Not public and general | 1661 c. 303 | 25 June 1661 |
Act and Commission for apprehending of Robert Oig Buchannan and John Campbell in Torrie.
| Not public and general | 1661 c. 304 | 25 June 1661 |
Act in favours of Mr Johne Rosse Minister at Brasse against Mr Johne Young late Minister thereat.
| Not public and general | 1661 c. 305 | 25 June 1661 |
Act in favours of Mr William Minister at Aitoun.
| Not public and general | 1661 c. 306 | 25 June 1661 |
Act in favors of Barbara Glaidstans relict of Mr George Martine Master of the old College of S_{t} Andrews and her children.
| Not public and general | 1661 c. 307 | 25 June 1661 |
Act in favours of Mr Martine M^{c}Pherson Minister at Kilmure.
| Prohibited Exports Act 1661 (repealed) | 1661 c. 308; 1661 c. 46 | 28 June 1661 |
Act dischargeing the exportation of wollen yearn worsteid broken copper and pewter. (Repealed by Statute Law Revision (Scotland) Act 1906 (6 Edw. 7. c. 38))
| Registration (No. 2) Act 1661 (repealed) | 1661 c. 309 | 28 June 1661 |
Act for raising the price and fee of the Lord Registers subscription. (Repealed by Statute Law Revision (Scotland) Act 1906 (6 Edw. 7. c. 38))
| Tradesmen Act 1661 (repealed) | 1661 c. 310; 1661 c. 47 | 2 July 1661 |
Act dischargeing tradesmen to import made work. (Repealed by Statute Law Revision (Scotland) Act 1906 (6 Edw. 7. c. 38))
| Not public and general | 1661 c. 311 | 2 July 1661 |
Act in favours of Johne Campbell of Larges anent the making up of the loss of his evidents.
| Not public and general | 1661 c. 312 | 2 July 1661 |
Act in favours of the relict and children of M^{r} John Alexander minister at Hodom.
| Not public and general | 1661 c. 313 | 2 July 1661 |
Act appointing William Ferwharson of Inveray younger to keep a guard this sumer for the Shirreffdome of Kincarden.
| Not public and general | 1661 c. 314 | 2 July 1661 |
Act and Decreit in favours of Robert Hammilton assignay of the deceast Quintein Hammilton of Barncleuch captane of the Castle of Evandale against the Shire of Lanerick.
| Not public and general | 1661 c. 315 | 4 July 1661 |
Ratification in favours of James Marques of Montrose.
| Not public and general | 1661 c. 316 | 4 July 1661 |
Act in favours of the relict and bairnes of George Campbell Merchant in Edinburgh.
| Not public and general | 1661 c. 317 | 4 July 1661 |
Act in favours of James Lord Forrester anent his ditches neir Corstorphine.
| Not public and general | 1661 c. 318 | 4 July 1661 |
Act in favours of the Schoolmaster of Chanrie and his successours.
| Not public and general | 1661 c. 319 | 4 July 1661 |
Act for ratifieing the union of the paroches of Logie Montrose and Pearth.
| Salmon (No. 2) Act 1661 (repealed) | 1661 c. 320 | 4 July 1661 |
Act anent cruves &c. upon fresh waters in forbidden tyme. (Repealed by Statute Law Revision (Scotland) Act 1906 (6 Edw. 7. c. 38))
| Supply (No. 3) Act 1661 (repealed) | 1661 c. 321 | 4 July 1661 |
Act anent the accompts of the moneths mantenance imposed for defraying his Majesties expences from Holland &c. (Repealed by Statute Law Revision (Scotland) Act 1906 (6 Edw. 7. c. 38))
| Not public and general | 1661 c. 322 | 5 July 1661 |
Act and Commission for the losses and annuelrents of James Duke of Hammilton and other forfalted persons.
| Not public and general | 1661 c. 323 | 5 July 1661 |
Act and Decreit in favours of Lachlan M^{c}intosh of Torcastle against Ewan Cameron of Lochyeld.
| Not public and general | 1661 c. 324 | 5 July 1661 |
Act in favours of William Earl of Dalhoussie and others for releiving them of certain sums advanced for a levey of horse in the yeer 1648.
| Not public and general | 1661 c. 325 | 5 July 1661 |
Act and Recommendation in favours of William Sympson baillie of Dysert for reparation of his losses.
| Not public and general | 1661 c. 326 | 5 July 1661 |
Act in favours of Mr Thomas Thoris Minister at Daviot.
| Not public and general | 1661 c. 327 | 5 July 1661 |
Act in favours of Mr Robert Ramesay late Minister at Comertries.
| Not public and general | 1661 c. 328 | 5 July 1661 |
Act and Decreit in favours of Murdo M^{c}clean of Lochbowie against John M^{c}alaster Roy alias Campbell and others.
| Not public and general | 1661 c. 329; 1661 c. 53 | 9 July 1661 |
Act ratifieing the act of Parliament 1633 (Note: 1633 c. 10) anent the annexation of his Majesties propertie.
| Vacant Stipends Act 1661 (repealed) | 1661 c. 330; 1661 c. 52 | 9 July 1661 |
Act concerning the disposall of vacand stipends. (Repealed by Statute Law Revision (Scotland) Act 1906 (6 Edw. 7. c. 38))
| Patrons Act 1661 (repealed) | 1661 c. 331; 1661 c. 54 | 9 July 1661 |
Act in favours of laik Patrons of Provostries Prebendaries Chaplanries and Altarages. (Repealed by Statute Law Revision (Scotland) Act 1964 (c. 80))
| Shipping (No. 2) Act 1661 (repealed) | 1661 c. 332; 1661 c. 55 | 9 July 1661 |
Act anent Cocquets and entries of Ships. (Repealed by Statute Law Revision (Scotland) Act 1906 (6 Edw. 7. c. 38))
| Colliers Act 1661 (repealed) | 1661 c. 333; 1661 c. 56 | 9 July 1661 |
Act anent Coalhewers. (Repealed by Statute Law Revision (Scotland) Act 1906 (6 Edw. 7. c. 38))
| Customs Act 1661 (repealed) | 1661 c. 334; 1661 c. 57 | 9 July 1661 |
Act dischargeing the custom of tuo and a halff of the hundredth and the impost of four punds on the tun. (Repealed by Statute Law Revision (Scotland) Act 1906 (6 Edw. 7. c. 38))
| Ward Holdings Act 1661 (repealed) | 1661 c. 335; 1661 c. 58 | 9 July 1661 |
Act in favours of those who get thair waird holding changed by the King's Majestie. (Repealed by Statute Law Revision (Scotland) Act 1906 (6 Edw. 7. c. 38))
| Exchequer Act 1661 (repealed) | 1661 c. 336; 1661 c. 59 | 9 July 1661 |
Act anent the Exchequer. (Repealed by Statute Law Revision (Scotland) Act 1906 (6 Edw. 7. c. 38))
| Signatures Act 1661 (repealed) | 1661 c. 337; 1661 c. 0 | 9 July 1661 |
Act concerning docqueting and presenting of Signatours. (Repealed by Statute Law Revision (Scotland) Act 1906 (6 Edw. 7. c. 38))
| Justices of the Peace Act 1661 (repealed) | 1661 c. 338; 1661 c. 38 | 9 July 1661 |
Commission and Instructions to the Justices of the Peace and Constables. (Repealed by District Courts (Scotland) Act 1975 (c. 20))
| Public Debt Act 1661 (repealed) | 1661 c. 339 | 9 July 1661 |
Act suspending execution upon bands for publict debts till the next Session of Parliament. (Repealed by Statute Law Revision (Scotland) Act 1906 (6 Edw. 7. c. 38))
| Statute Law Amendment Act 1661 (repealed) | 1661 c. 340 | 9 July 1661 |
Act anent the amendment of some of the acts of Parliament past before the generall act of Rescission. (Repealed by Statute Law Revision (Scotland) Act 1906 (6 Edw. 7. c. 38))
| Commissaires of Edinburgh Act 1661 (repealed) | 1661 c. 341 | 9 July 1661 |
Act in favours of the Commissers of Edinburgh. (Repealed by Statute Law Revision (Scotland) Act 1906 (6 Edw. 7. c. 38))
| Trial of Certain Prisoners Act 1661 (repealed) | 1661 c. 342 | 9 July 1661 |
Act and Commission for trying certain prissoners incarcerate within the tolbuith of Pearth. (Repealed by Statute Law Revision (Scotland) Act 1906 (6 Edw. 7. c. 38))
| Not public and general | 1661 c. 343 | 9 July 1661 |
Act and Commission for trying certain prissoners incarcerate within the tolbuith of Pearth.
| Diligence Act 1661 (repealed) | 1661 c. 344; 1661 c. 62 | 12 July 1661 |
Act for ordering the payment of Debts betuixt Creditor and Debitor. (Repealed by Bankruptcy and Diligence etc. (Scotland) Act 2007 (asp 3))
| Usury Act 1661 (repealed) | 1661 c. 345; 1661 c. 49 | 12 July 1661 |
Act reducing annuel rents to sex for hundreth. (Repealed by Statute Law Revision (Scotland) Act 1906 (6 Edw. 7. c. 38))
| Not public and general | 1661 c. 346 | 12 July 1661 |
Act in favours of Johne Earl of Midletoun and Sir John Smyth.
| Not public and general | 1661 c. 347 | 12 July 1661 |
Act in favours of Johne Earle of Midle toun and Sir Johne Weyms of Bogie &c.
| Not public and general | 1661 c. 348 | 12 July 1661 |
Act in favours of James Earle of Callander and other gentlemen of the shire of Stirline.
| Not public and general | 1661 c. 349 | 12 July 1661 |
Act and Decreit in favours of Robert Menzies fiar of Enoch against James Menzies of Enoch his father.
| Not public and general | 1661 c. 350 | 12 July 1661 |
Act in favours of the Burgh of Culrose for tuo fairs yeerly.
| Not public and general | 1661 c. 351 | 12 July 1661 |
Act in favours of Mr John Hay of Haystoun one of the Clerks of Session.
| Supply (No. 4) Act 1661 (repealed) | 1661 c. 352 | 12 July 1661 |
Act and Commission anent the inbringing of the remainder of the tuo moneths mantenance imposed in 1651 &c. (Repealed by Statute Law Revision (Scotland) Act 1906 (6 Edw. 7. c. 38))
| Supply (No. 5) Act 1661 (repealed) | 1661 c. 353 | 12 July 1661 |
Act anent the inbringing of the merks imposed on the royal burrows 1650 &c. (Repealed by Statute Law Revision (Scotland) Act 1906 (6 Edw. 7. c. 38))
| Not public and general | 1661 c. 354 | 12 July 1661 |
Act in favours of John Gordoun and Alexander Strachan for payment of their expences in apprehending of William Roy Menzies.
| Not public and general | 1661 c. 355 | 12 July 1661 |
Act and Decreit in favours of Marion Maxwell and Robert Mc Brair her son against David McBrair of Newwark.
| Not public and general | 1661 c. 356 | 12 July 1661 |
Act anent the payment of the allowance of the Commissioner of the Shire of Sutherland by the heritors &c.
| Aberdeen Commissary Courts Act 1661 (repealed) | 1661 c. 357 | 12 July 1661 |
Act anent the sitting of the Commisser Courts within the Burgh of Aberdein. (Repealed by Statute Law Revision (Scotland) Act 1906 (6 Edw. 7. c. 38))
| Not public and general | 1661 c. 358 | 12 July 1661 |
Act and Decreit in favours of Alexander Squire in Auchinbowie against David Mooreheid of Tickitsheuch.
| Not public and general | 1661 c. 359 | 12 July 1661 |
Act and Decreit in favours of Margaret and Jonnet Howieson against James Gray of Lowriestoun.
| Not public and general | 1661 c. 360 | 12 July 1661 |
Act in favours of the parichoners of Libbertoun.
| Not public and general | 1661 c. 361 | 12 July 1661 |
Act in favours of John Earle of Dundte for repossessing him in the lands of Knockalloway and Auchlaboyle.
| Not public and general | 1661 c. 362 | 12 July 1661 |
Act and Decreit in favours of Barbara Hammilton relict of the deceast James Hammilton of Stenhouse against Sir William Baillie of Lamington and others.
| Not public and general | 1661 c. 363 | 12 July 1661 |
Act in favours of M^{r} Patrick Gillespie.
| Not public and general | 1661 c. 364 | 12 July 1661 |
Act in favours of Johne Cuninghame writter to his Majesties Signet.
| Not public and general | 1661 c. 365 | 12 July 1661 |
Act and Licence in favours of Mr Robert Forbes professor of Philosophie in Marishall Colledge Aberdeen to print ane book.
| Hatmakers Act 1661 Not public and general | 1661 c. 366 | 12 July 1661 |
Act in favours of the Hatmakers of Edinburgh. Act in favour of the Hatmakers of Edinburgh.
| Not public and general | 1661 c. 367 | 12 July 1661 |
Act and Remit in favours of John George son of the deceast John George Mer chant burges of Edinburgh.
| Not public and general | 1661 c. 368 | 12 July 1661 |
Act in favours of M^{r} Robert Dalgleish agent for the kirk for payment of his yeerly fie.
| Not public and general | 1661 c. 369 | 12 July 1661 |
Act and Commission to Hugh Earle of Eglingtoun and others for trying certain persons for thift and robrie &c.
| Not public and general | 1661 c. 370 | 12 July 1661 |
Act in favours of James Earle of Southesk.
| Not public and general | 1661 c. 371 | 12 July 1661 |
Act and Decreit in favours of John M^{c}Dougall of Donnollie and others against the late Marques of Argyle, James Campbell of Ardkinlas and others.
| Not public and general | 1661 c. 372 | 12 July 1661 |
Ratification in favours of William Earle of Dalhoussie of the office of Sherriffship of Edinburgh.
| Not public and general | 1661 c. 373 | 12 July 1661 |
Ratification in favours of Patrick Earle of Panmure of the Lordschip of Breichen and Navar &c.
| Not public and general | 1661 c. 374 | 12 July 1661 |
Act in favours of James Marques of Montrose and Patrick Earle of Panmure Justices of the waters of North and South Esk.
| Not public and general | 1661 c. 375 | 12 July 1661 |
Ratification in favours of James Lord Rollo of the Barronie of Duncrub &c.
| Not public and general | 1661 c. 376 | 12 July 1661 |
Ratification in favours of Alexander Earle of Murray of the Earledome of Murray &c.
| Not public and general | 1661 c. 377 | 12 July 1661 |
Ratification in favours of the Burgh of Dundie of their charters and infeftments.
| Not public and general | 1661 c. 378 | 12 July 1661 |
Ratification in favours of William Blair of Kinfauns of the lands and Barrony of Kinfauns &c.
| Not public and general | 1661 c. 379 | 12 July 1661 |
Ratification in favours of the Burgh of Kintore of their liberties and priveledges.
| Not public and general | 1661 c. 380 | 12 July 1661 |
Ratification in favours of Johne Earle of Tueddale and Jeane Countes of Tued dale his spouse.
| Not public and general | 1661 c. 381 | 12 July 1661 |
Ratification in favours of Alexander Thomson burges of Edinburgh of the office of Maister tailzeour in Scotland.
| Not public and general | 1661 c. 382 | 12 July 1661 |
Ratification in favours of Johne Earle of Atholl of the office of heretable baillierie of Dunkeld.
| Not public and general | 1661 c. 383 | 12 July 1661 |
Ratification in favours of Sir John Gilmour of Craigmiller Knight President of the College of Justice.
| Not public and general | 1661 c. 384 | 12 July 1661 |
Ratification in favours of Sir James Hope of Hopetoun.
| Not public and general | 1661 c. 385 | 12 July 1661 |
Ratification in favours of Sir Andrew Agnew of Lochnaw knight.
| Not public and general | 1661 c. 386 | 12 July 1661 |
Ratification in favours of Sir Robert Murray Provest of Edinburgh.
| Not public and general | 1661 c. 387 | 12 July 1661 |
Ratification in favours of Sir John Gilmoir Lord President of the Session.
| Not public and general | 1661 c. 388 | 12 July 1661 |
Ratification in favours of James Innes of Sandsyde of the Commissariot of Caithnes and Sutherland.
| Not public and general | 1661 c. 389 | 12 July 1661 |
Ratification in favours of Sir Hew Campbell of Calder.
| Not public and general | 1661 c. 390 | 12 July 1661 |
Act in favours of some Saltmakers in Annandale.
| Not public and general | 1661 c. 391 | 12 July 1661 |
Act rescinding the pretendit forfaltour of the deceast Patrick Earle of Forth.
| Saving the Rights Act 1661 Not public and general | 1661 c. 392; 1661 c. 63 | 12 July 1661 |
Act Salvo Jure cujuslibet. Act Salvo Jure cujuslibet.
| Adjournment Act 1661 (repealed) | 1661 c. 393; 1661 c. 63 | 12 July 1661 |
Act of Adjournment. Act of Adjournment. (Repealed by Statute Law Revision (Scotland) Act 1906 (6 Edw. 7. c. 38))

=== Sources ===
- Alexander, William (1841). "Acta Parliamentorum Regis Caroli Secundi". An Abridgement of the Acts of the Parliaments of Scotland. Edinburgh: Adam and Charles Black. pp. A48–A55 – via Google Books.
- Alexander, William (1841). "Acta Parliamentorum Regis Caroli Secundi". An Abridgement of the Acts of the Parliaments of Scotland. Edinburgh: Adam and Charles Black. pp. A48–A55 – via Google Books.
- Chronological Table of the Statutes. London: Her Majesty's Stationery Office. 1972. pp. 1350–1352 – via Google Books.
- "Acts of the Old Scottish Parliament: 1661". legislation.gov.uk. The National Archives.
- "Index of Statutes: Index of Statutes: Charles II (1649-1685)". Records of the Parliaments of Scotland to 1707. University of St Andrews.

== See also ==
- List of legislation in the United Kingdom
- Records of the Parliaments of Scotland
