= Thomas Aikenhead =

Last person in Britain executed for blasphemy (1676–1697)

- Baptised: 28 March 1676
- Died: 8 January 1697 (aged 20); Edinburgh, Scotland
- Cause of death: Execution by hanging
- Education: University of Edinburgh
- Occupation: Student
- Known for: Last person in Great Britain to be executed for blasphemy

Thomas Aikenhead (bapt. 28 March 1676 – 8 January 1697) was a Scottish student from Edinburgh, who was prosecuted and executed at the age of 20, on a charge of blasphemy under the Blasphemy Act 1661 and Blasphemy Act 1695. He was the last person in Great Britain to be executed for blasphemy. His execution occurred 85 years after the death of Edward Wightman (1612), the last person to be burned at the stake for heresy in England.

== Early life ==
Thomas Aikenhead was the son of James Aikenhead and Helen Ramsey. His father was a burgess of Edinburgh, as was his paternal grandfather (also named Thomas Aikenhead). His maternal grandfather was a clergyman. He was baptised on 28 March 1676, the fourth child and first son of the family. Of his three older sisters (Jonet, Katherine, and Margaret), at least one and possibly two died before he was born.

== Indictment ==
During his studies at the University of Edinburgh, Aikenhead discussed and contested religion with acquaintances over twelve months. At the trial four of these acquaintances gave testimony against Aikenhead, one being a writer from Edinburgh and the rest fellow university students.

Aikenhead was indicted in December 1696. The indictment read:

"You are indicted and accused... by the crime of blasphemy against God, or any of the persons of the blessed trinity, or against the holy scriptures, of our holy religion... [blasphemy] is a crime of the highest nature, and ought to be severely punished".

The indictment further reads:

"No counsel appeared for the prisoner; nor does it seem that one word was urged upon his behalf during the course of the trial".

However, Lord Advocate Sir James Stewart, who oversaw the trial, said that had the court been endued with the humanity to appoint a defence counsel for Aikenhead, the defence would have undoubtedly pled his blasphemous discussions were:

"Rash words... in the heat of controversy... which by no means coincided with his serious notions... and that he heartily repented."

This might have prevented the execution of Aikenhead, as Stewart states:

"The jury could not, without being guilty of perjury, have convicted him of obstinately persisting to deny the Trinity, which the statute required."

Historian Humberto Garcia notes Aikenhead's trial in the context of witch hunt against Socinians, which were associated with Islam at the time. Garcia cites William Cobbett's work on the published proceedings of the trial in which Aikenhead was accused of preferring Islam over Christianity and that he publicly claimed that Christendom will eventually be extinguished by Mohammedanism.

== Evidence of blasphemy ==
In the state trials, the witnesses who gave evidence against Aikenhead of blasphemy were Adam Mitchell, a student; John Neilsome, a writer; Patrick Midletourne, a student; John Potter, a student who did not add further testimony but agreed; and Mungo Craig, a student.

Lord Advocate Sir James Stewart summarises the evidence as:

You, Thomas Aikenhead, "shaking off all fear of God and his majesties laws, have now for more than twelve months made it your endeavour to vent your wicked blasphemies against God and our Saviour Jesus Christ, holy Scriptures, and all religion."

You say that "divinity or the doctrine of theology was a rhapsody of feigned and ill-invented nonsense, patched up partly of the moral doctrine of philosophers, and partly of poetical fictions and extravagant chimeras".

You called the "Old Testament Ezra's Fables... which were an allusion of Aesop's Fables, and that Ezra was... a cunning man who convinced a number of Babylonian slaves to follow him, for whom he made up a feined genealogy as if they had been descended of kings and princes in the land of Canaan, and thereby imposed upon Cyrus who was a Persian and stranger, persuading him by the device of a pretend prophecy concerning himself."

You called the "New Testament the History of the Imposter Christ, and affirming him to have learned magic in Egypt, and that coming from Egypt into Judea, he picked up a few ignorant blockish fellows, whom he knew by his skill and physiognomy, had strong imaginations, and that by the help of exalted imagination, he played his pranks as you blasphemously termed the working of his miracles".

Of Moses you said if there ever was such as man, "to have also learned magic in Egypt, but that he was both the better artist and better politician than Jesus; as also you have cursed Ezra, Moses, and Jesus, and all men of that sort, affirming the holy Scriptures are so stuffed with madness, nonsense, and contradictions, that you admired the stupidity of the world in being so long deluded by them".

You also deny spirits, and maintain that God, the world, and nature, are but one thing, and that the world was from eternity.

Lord Stewart asserts that Aikenhead deserved to be punished by death as an example and to instill terror in others who may blaspheme.

Patrick Midletourne, one of the witnesses, says that he "heard [Aikenhead] call Moses a magician, and that Mahamet was both the better artist and politician than Jesus". This differs from the other witness's testimony, who claim Aikenhead said that Moses was the better artist and politician.

== Trial and sentence ==
The case was prosecuted by the Lord Advocate, Sir James Stewart, who demanded the death penalty in order to set an example to others who might otherwise express such opinions. On 24 December 1696, the jury found Aikenhead guilty of cursing and railing against God, denying the incarnation and the Trinity, and scoffing at the Scriptures.

He was sentenced to death by hanging. This was an extraordinary penalty, as the 1695 statute called for execution only upon the third conviction for this offence; first-time offenders were to be sack-clothed and imprisoned.

Thomas Aikenhead, in his end speech of the trial, said:

"It is a principle innate and co-natural to every man to have an insatiable inclination to the truth and to seek for it as for hid treasure, which indeed have an effect upon me, and my reason was... that I might build my faith upon uncontroverable grounds... so I proceeded until the more I thought thereon, the further I was from finding the verity I desired."

Aikenhead said that sceptics were "stained, and charged with some great and numerous villanys". He said of this:

"But I can charge the world if they can stain me, or lay any such thing to my charge, so that it was out of a pure love to truth, and my own happiness that I acted."

After the trial, according to Aikenhead's entry in the Dictionary of Unitarian and Universalist Biography (written by Andrew Hill):

Aikenhead petitioned the Privy Council to consider his "deplorable circumstances and tender years". Also, he had forgotten to mention that he was also a first-time offender. Two ministers and two Privy Councillors pleaded on his behalf, but to no avail. On 7 January, after another petition, the Privy Council ruled that they would not grant a reprieve unless the church interceded for him. The Church of Scotland's General Assembly, sitting in Edinburgh at the time, urged "vigorous execution" to curb "the abounding of impiety and profanity in this land". Thus Aikenhead's sentence was confirmed.

== Execution ==
On the morning of 8 January 1697, the day he was to die, Aikenhead wrote to his friends and parents, pointing out that his parents were "dear and worthy friends." Aikenhead said of the letter:

"Enclosed, will give satisfaction to you in particular, and the world in general, and after I am gone [for you to] produce more charity than has been my fortune... and remove the apprehensions, which I hear are various with many about my case, being the last words of a dying person, and proceeding from the sincerity of my heart."

Aikenhead goes on to say allegations of him practising magic and conversing with devils were false, and ends his letter with:

"I desire you may call for extracts of my petitions to the council and judiciary, which I relate to in my last speech, which I recommend to your care, that I may be vindicated from any false aspersions."

Aikenhead may have read this letter outside the Tolbooth, before making the long walk, under guard, to the gallows on the road between Edinburgh and Leith. He was said to have died Bible in hand, "with all the Marks of a true Penitent".

Thomas Babington Macaulay, British historian of the 19th century, said of Aikenhead's death that:

"The preachers who were the poor boy's murderers crowded round him at the gallows, and while he was struggling in the last agony, insulted Heaven with prayers more blasphemous than anything [Aikenhead] had uttered. Wodrow has told no blacker story of Dundee"

Aikenhead was the last person hanged for blasphemy in Great Britain, although it remained a capital offence in Scotland until the Leasing-making (Scotland) Act 1825 (6 Geo. 4. c. 47) was passed.

== In fiction ==
The case of Thomas Aikenhead provides the inspiration for Dilys Rose's novel Unspeakable (2017). Aikenhead features as a central character in Heather Richardson's novel Doubting Thomas (2017). Aikenhead is mentioned in a fictional book in Ian McEwan's What we can know (2025).

== See also ==
- I Am Thomas, a 2016 play based on Aikenhead
- John William Gott, prosecuted for blasphemy and jailed in 1922
- George Holyoake, convicted for blasphemy in a public lecture in 1842
- Aikenhead Award
