= Scottish Secular Society =

Scottish campaigning organisation

- Abbreviation: SSS
- Formation: 2012
- Purpose: Advancement of human rights and equality, freedom of religion and freedom from religion. The removal of religious privilege in Scottish public affairs. The promotion of secular ethics in Scottish society.
- Headquarters: Glasgow
- Region served: Scotland
- Chair: Neil Gregory
- Key people: Scott S Bevan, Leslie Thomson, Garry Otton, Ian McGregor, Francis McElroy, Robert Canning, Naomi Moore, Tom Dalton, Malcolm MacQueen, John Duncan, Paul Braterman, Caroline Lynch, Patrick Mackie, Mark Gordon
- Website: www.facebook.com/groups/810730568749150/

The Scottish Secular Society is a vocal secular organisation in Scotland and is based in Glasgow. It promotes the separation of church and state and educates the public on matters relating to the interface of religion and politics.

The Scottish Secular Society argues that freedom of religion, as well as freedom from religion, is a human right and that state sponsorship of selected religions encroaches upon that right. It holds that belief should be a private matter for the home or place of worship and should not have a place of privilege in society. The Scottish Secular Society is often critical of what it sees as the damaging effects of religion.

== History ==
Scotland's culture has been dominated by Christianity for most of recent history. However, there has been an undercurrent of free-thought and radical secularism spanning as far back as the 17th century to the likes of Scottish student Thomas Aikenhead, who was hanged for his criticism of religion and theology, and famously David Hume in the 18th century. Though Hume was raised by strict Calvinists, he became highly critical of religion, and his subsequent work disputed religious assertions such as the existence of miracles, intelligent design, and the immortality of the soul. His suspected atheism led to him being turned down for various academic positions, and a trial against him for the crime of heresy.

In the 19th century the radical subculture of free-thought in Scotland began to take a more organised form. Activists inspired by the ideas of social reformers such as Robert Owen, Richard Carlile, and the revolutionary thinker Thomas Paine formed the first secular societies in Edinburgh and Glasgow in 1821. In the second half of the century, secular societies were thriving in Edinburgh, Glasgow, Perth, Dundee, Paisley, Greenock, and Aberdeen.

Many prominent Scottish secularists, like J. M. Robertson from the Isle of Arran, eventually gravitated towards London, where they made great contributions to the movement. Secularist thought continued in the central belt of Scotland well into the twentieth century. In 1937, the Glasgow Corporation hosted both the National and Glasgow Secular Societies. Few other cities at the time would welcome the non-religious as well as the faithful.

Prior to January 2013, Caroline Lynch, a mother from the isle of Skye, was having increasing problems with the interference of religion in her child's education. Specifically the presentation of Christian mythology as fact by a Free Church of Scotland Minister during weekly classroom visits to the Highland school - including the significant distress caused to her child due to detailed descriptions of crucifixion, and eternal punishment in hell for non-believers. After finding similar concerns widespread online, Lynch, now based in Glasgow, and a small group like-minded secularists decided to create a campaign group to lobby and spread information on issues of religion and government in Scotland.

The Scottish Secular Society has since established its place in Scottish civil society by publicly commenting on current affairs in Scotland from a secularist perspective, successfully petitioning the Scottish parliament, giving evidence to the and hosting speaking events with speakers such as Alistair McBay of the National Secular Society, Patrick Harvie from the Scottish Green Party and Rachel Thain Gray from Glasgow Women's Library.

== Aikenhead Award ==
The Aikenhead award is the Scottish Secular Society's annual award for commitment to secular values. It is named after Thomas Aikenhead, a Scottish student who became the last person in Britain to be executed for the crime of blasphemy in 1696.

- The inaugural Aikenhead Award 2015 was given to Raif Badawi.
- The 2016 Award was given to the National Secular Society for their work in defence of freedom of conscience and against institutionalised religious privilege.

== Political lobbying ==
On 3 June 2013, the Scottish Secular Society joined with an Inverclyde parent, Mark Gordon, in petitioning the Scottish Parliament to change the implementation of Religious Observance in Scottish schools. Current legislation – presumes that parents agree to their children taking part in RO unless they inform the school otherwise. The petitioners sought to change this presumption while maintaining Religious Observance for those who asked to be included should they wish to do so. The Edinburgh Secular Society agreed but would prefer RO to be removed from schools altogether. The Scottish Parent Teacher Council (SPTC) said that school communities should be free to replace religion-based assemblies with secular alternatives. The Public Petitions Committee closed the Petition on May 14, 2014, after agreeing to write to the Scottish Government on the wider issue of local authorities ensuring parents are aware of their rights to withdraw their child from religious observance in school.

On 4 September 2014, the then Chair, Spencer Fildes, petitioned the Scottish Parliament on behalf of the Scottish Secular Society, "calling on the ... Scottish Government to issue official guidance to bar the presentation in Scottish publicly funded schools of separate creation and of Young Earth doctrines as viable alternatives to the established science of evolution, common descent, and deep time." The petition resulted in the then chair of the SSS, Spencer Fildes, and scientific adviser and board member, Professor Paul Braterman giving evidence to Holyrood's public petitions committee and, along with scientific adviser and board member, Professor Paul Braterman, gave evidence to the Public Petitions committee. The petition, which was supported by three Nobel Prize winners, attracted international attention, while its report on IFLScience received 300,000 Facebook "likes". The Public Petitions Committee forwarded the matter to the Education and Culture Committee, which on 12 May 2015 agreed to close the petition, having received clarification of guidance from the Scottish Government to the effect that "Guidance provided by Education Scotland… does not identify Creationism as a scientific principle. It should therefore not be taught as part of science lessons."

On 16 November 2016, Spencer Fildes again petitioned the Scottish Parliament on behalf of the Scottish Secular Society, "Calling on ... the Scottish Government to remove the constitutional anomaly that imposes unelected Church appointees on Local Authority Education Committees." Again, Fildes and Braterman gave evidence to the Public Petitions Committee, where members expressed sympathy with that Society's concerns about the undemocratic nature of such positions within the Local Government apparatus, and complications that could arise from this arrangement. After repeated correspondence, and having received assurances from the Scottish Government that it would pay attention to the issues raised should they still be relevant after the pending reorganisation of Scottish education, the Committee agreed on 29 June 2017 to close the petition. The Committee also agreed to highlight the issues raised to the Education and Skills Committee, thanked the Petitioners for having drawn attention to important issues, and made it clear that if governmental action does not deal with the problems, it would be appropriate to raise the matter again.

== Other activities ==
The Scottish Secular Society is also concerned with the rise of creationist or intelligent design organisations such as the Centre for Intelligent Design (C4ID), or the American Discovery Institute. It was, in part, responsible for the leaking of information to the Scottish Daily Record about creationism being promoted in an East Kilbride primary school. The Scottish Secular Society has called for clear guidance on creationism in schools in Scotland and states that it should be discussed within the confines of religious education classes.

In an April 2013 Radio Scotland interview, then chair of the Scottish Secular Society, Caroline Lynch, discussed the continuing rise in humanist marriage ceremonies.

On 1 October 2013, the Scottish Secular society wrote to Michael Russell requesting that creationism and intelligent design be specifically excluded from the educational setting outside of RME classes in the Scottish Educational system. Alasdair Allan responded by stating that Creationism and Intelligent Design is not scientific theory and that it has no place within the Scottish curriculum

On 23 October 2013, Caroline Lynch was invited to talk at an event sponsored by the Scottish Government and hosted by the University of Edinburgh entitled 'Religion In Scotland – Current Trends & Future Trajectories'. The meeting had representatives from faith groups and other political and legal contributors. The Scottish Secular Society were invited to make contributions on the growing role of secularism and the petition under consideration within the Scottish Parliament.

On 5 November 2013, the Scottish Secular Society formally responded to the Scottish Government draft guidance on Conduct of Relationships, Sexual Health and Parenthood Education.

The Scottish Secular Society is one of the founding members of Audit Scotland's Equality and Human Rights Advisory Group (EHRAG). The purpose of this group is to help Audit Scotland answer three questions: What are the equality issues Audit Scotland and the Accounts Commission need to know about that will affect their work? What needs to be done differently? How can the group help or get involved? The Scottish Secular Society has also made contributions to the Scottish Parliament's Equality and Human Rights Committee and to stakeholder focus groups organised by the Equality and Human Rights Commission.

As of February 2018 the Scottish Secular Society has been signatory to the Scottish Declaration on Human Rights.

== Criticism ==
The Scottish Secular Society have been criticised by the Free Church of Scotland, who state that "their belief and intention is that there should be no religious worship in state schools at all. They just see this as a first step." The petition against the teaching of creationism was criticised by Glasgow's Centre for Intelligent Design and by the US-based Young Earth creationist organisation Answers in Genesis
