= Religious Observance =

Religious observance includes all overt kinds of religious behavior. Research in this area shows the extent and patterning of religious activities in various populations and makes it possible to test theories about the causes of religious behavior. Religious commitment is lower in countries with higher education, higher GDP and greater income equality.

== Sociological and psychological factors ==
There are sociological and psychological sources of variation in religious observance. Sociological factors include historical trends, social class and minority groups. Psychological factors include age, sex, and personality traits. Research and studies carried out between 1900 and the present day in UK, the US and Europe shows the extent and patterning of religious activities in the population and makes it possible to test theories about the causes of religious behavior.

== Measures and indexes ==
Religious observance may take the form of a religious element of a school morning assembly (e.g. prayers or hymn singing), a visit to a church for a service or a visit by a minister to a classroom where children are encouraged to join in prayer or are told that doctrinal material is fact, rather than it being discussed in a comparative or historical context. Parents should have the statutory right to withdraw their child from religious observance. Some schools across Europe inform parents of this right.

== Variations ==
Variations raise questions of Why does A go to church while B does not? The answer involves three possible forms:

- Social learning and group pressures
- Individual differences in personality
- Socioeconomic categories

== Criticism ==
Whilst parents should be informed of their right to opt out of Religious Observance, a UK YouGov poll of 1000 parents found 39% of parents were not aware of their right to withdraw. This was commissioned by the Humanist Society Scotland in April 2012. On 3 June 2013 the Scottish Secular Society launched a petition to ensure every parent gave express permission for their child to attend RO. In 2018, the Archbishop of the Church of Cyprus suggested abolishing five religious dates marked as school holidays.
