= Blasphemy Act 1695 =

Act of the pre-Union Parliament of Scotland

- Act of Parliament
- Parliament of Scotland
- Long title: Act against Blasphemy.
- Citation: 1695 c. 11

Dates
- Royal assent: 28 June 1695

Other legislation
- Repealed by: Doctrine of the Trinity Act 1813

Status: Repealed

Text of statute as originally enacted

The Blasphemy Act 1695 (c. 11) was an act of the Parliament of Scotland, passed on 28 June 1695.

The act reaffirmed the earlier Blasphemy Act 1661 (c. 216) and created new offences with gentler punishments for first- and second-time offenders. It was brought into use in a campaign in 1696 against those regarded as promoting Deism or Atheism. Both Acts were specified in the indictment which led to the execution of Thomas Aikenhead.

The act was repealed in 1813 under the Doctrine of the Trinity Act 1813 (53 Geo. 3. c. 160).
