= I Am Thomas =

British play

I Am Thomas: A Brutal Comedy with Songs
- Original language: English
- Subject: Thomas Aikenhead
- Setting: Edinburgh 1696 and Present Day

Premiere
- Date: 24 February 2016
- Place: Liverpool Playhouse

I Am Thomas: A Brutal Comedy with Songs is a play based around the death of Thomas Aikenhead, the last person to be hanged for blasphemy in Britain. The play received its world premiere at the Liverpool Playhouse, in February 2016, before embarking on a short UK tour. It is a co-production between Told by an Idiot, the National Theatre of Scotland and the Royal Lyceum Theatre.

== Production history ==
I Am Thomas: A Brutal Comedy with Songs is a devised theatre play created by Told by an Idiot, based on the real-life story of Thomas Aikenhead, a student from Edinburgh who was prosecuted and executed at the age of 20 on a charge of blasphemy. He was executed at Gallow Lee in Edinburgh in 1697 and was the last person in Britain to be executed for blasphemy. Told through the medium of song, the play is set in Edinburgh between 1696 and present day. On 14 April 2015, it was announced by The Royal Lyceum Theatre, that the play would form part of the 50th anniversary season of the Royal Lyceum Theatre company. It is a co-production between Told by an Idiot, the National Theatre of Scotland and the Royal Lyceum Theatre. I Am Thomas received its world premiere at the Liverpool Playhouse on 24 February 2016, following previews from 19 February, for a limited run until 27 February.

The play is directed by Paul Hunter, artistic director of Told by an Idiot, with design by Laura Hopkins, lighting design by Paul Anderson, music by Iain Johnstone, lyrics by Simon Armitage and sound by Adrienne Quartly. Following its premiere production the play embarked on a short UK tour in March and April 2016, visiting The Lowry, Salford, Salisbury Playhouse, Salisbury, Royal Lyceum Theatre, Edinburgh, Eden Court Theatre, Inverness, and Wilton's Music Hall, London. The play features an ensemble cast of eight who take it in turn to play the title role. The cast includes John Cobb, Charlie Folorunsho, Amanda Hadingue, Myra McFadyen, Hannah McPake, John Pfumojena, Dominic Marsh and Iain Johnstone who wrote the plays score. A typical performance runs two hours, including one interval of 20 mins.

== Critical reception ==
The play has received mixed to positive reviews from critics.
