= Nonconformist Relief Act 1779 =

Act of the Parliament of Great Britain

Nonconformist Relief Act 1779 (Note: The citation of this act by this short title was authorised by section 1 of, and the first schedule to, the Short Titles Act 1896. Due to the repeal of those provisions it is now authorised by section 19(2) of the Interpretation Act 1978.)
- Act of Parliament
- Parliament of Great Britain
- Long title: An act for the further relief of protestant dissenting ministers and schoolmasters.
- Citation: 19 Geo. 3. c. 44
- Territorial extent: Great Britain

Dates
- Royal assent: 18 May 1779
- Commencement: 26 November 1778 (Note: Start of session.)
- Repealed: 1 January 1970
Other legislation
Amends	Toleration Act 1688
Amended by	Dissenters (Ireland) Act 1817
Repealed by	{{ubliPromissory Oaths Act 1871|Statute Law Revision Act 1888|Territorial Army and Militia Act 1921|Statute Law (Repeals) Act 1969}}
Relates to	Toleration Act 1688

Status: Repealed

Text of statute as originally enacted

The Nonconformist Relief Act 1779 (19 Geo. 3. c. 44) was an act of the Parliament of Great Britain. The act allowed any Dissenter to preach and teach on the condition that he declared he was a Protestant; took the Oaths of Allegiance and supremacy; and took the Scriptures for his rule of faith and practice. It relieved dissenting ministers from the obligation to subscribe to the Thirty-nine Articles.

== Subsequent developments ==
Dissenters (Ireland) Act 1817
- Act of Parliament
- Parliament of the United Kingdom
- Long title: An Act to relieve Persons who impugn the Doctrine of the Holy Trinity from certain Penalties.
- Citation: 57 Geo. 3. c. 70
- Territorial extent: United Kingdom

Dates
- Royal assent: 7 July 1817
- Commencement: 7 July 1817 (Note: The Acts of Parliament (Commencement) Act 1793.)
- Repealed: 5 August 1873
Other legislation
Amends	Toleration Act 1719; Nonconformist Relief Act 1779; Doctrine of the Trinity Act 1813
Amended by	Promissory Oaths Act 1871; Statute Law Revision Act 1874
Repealed by	Statute Law Revision Act 1873; Statute Law Revision Act (Northern Ireland) 1954
Relates to	Toleration Act 1688

Status: Repealed

Text of statute as originally enacted

The Dissenters (Ireland) Act 1817 (57 Geo. 3. c. 70) extended both the 1779 act and the Doctrine of the Trinity Act 1813 (53 Geo. 3. c. 160) to Ireland.

Section 1 from the words "if he scruple" down to the words "subscribed by Protestant dissenting ministers and," and from the words "and by an Act made in the tenth year," down to the words "subscribe the declaration therein mentioned," and "so much of the rest of the act as relates to the oath and declaration mentioned in the part hereby repealed" was repealed by section 1 of, and part II of schedule one to, the Promissory Oaths Act 1871 (34 & 35 Vict. c. 48), which came into force on 13 July 1871.

The whole act, so far as unrepealed, was repealed by section 1 of, and part II of the schedule to, the Statute Law (Repeals) Act 1969, which came into force on 1 January 1970.
