= Blasphemy Act 1661 =

Act of the pre-Union Parliament of Scotland

- Act of Parliament
- Parliament of Scotland
- Long title: Act against the cryme of Blasphemie.
- Citation: 1661 c. 216 [12mo ed: c. 21]

Dates
- Royal assent: 16 May 1681

Other legislation
- Repealed by: Doctrine of the Trinity Act 1813

Status: Repealed

Text of statute as originally enacted

The Blasphemy Act 1661 (c. 216) was an act of the Parliament of Scotland.

The act enshrined the blasphemy offence into statute. It legislated that anyone who should rail upon and curse God or the Trinity, 'not being distracted in his wits', should be punished. The punishment was the death penalty.

The Act against Blasphemy 1695 further clarified the offence and blasphemy was later abolished in 1813 under the Doctrine of the Trinity Act 1813.
