= Doctrine of the Trinity Act 1813 =

Act of the Parliament of the United Kingdom

- Act of Parliament
- Parliament of the United Kingdom
- Long title: An Act to relieve Persons who impugn the Doctrine of the Holy Trinity from certain Penalties.
- Citation: 53 Geo. 3. c. 160
- Introduced by: William Smith (Commons)
- Territorial extent: United Kingdom

Dates
- Royal assent: 21 July 1813
- Commencement: 21 July 1813 (Note: The Acts of Parliament (Commencement) Act 1793.)
- Repealed: 5 August 1873
Other legislation
Amends	Toleration Act 1689
Repeals/revokes	Act against Blasphemy 1661; Act against Blasphemy 1695; Blasphemy Act 1697
Amended by	Dissenters (Ireland) Act 1817
Repealed by	Statute Law Revision Act 1873

Status: Repealed

Text of statute as originally enacted

The Doctrine of the Trinity Act 1813 (53 Geo. 3. c. 160), also known as the Trinitarian Act 1812, the Unitarian Relief Act, the Trinity Act, the Unitarian Toleration Bill, or Mr William Smith's Bill (after Whig politician William Smith), was an act of the Parliament of the United Kingdom which amended its blasphemy laws and granted toleration for Unitarian worship.

== Provisions ==
Section 1 of the act amended the Toleration Act 1689 (1 Will. & Mar. c. 18) (passed by the Parliament of England) to include non-Trinitarians among the Protestant dissenters whose practices would be tolerated.

Section 2 of the act repealed the provision of the Blasphemy Act 1697 (9 Will. 3. c. 35) (also English) which imposed civil penalties on anyone professed or educated as a Christian who denied the Trinity.

Section 3 of the act repealed two acts of the Parliament of Scotland which made blasphemy punishable by death: the Act against Blasphemy 1661 and Act against Blasphemy 1695.

== Subsequent developments ==
The Dissenters (Ireland) Act 1817 (57 Geo. 3. c. 70) extended the act to Ireland, and amended the Prohibition of Disturbance of Worship Act 1719 (6 Geo. 1. c. 5 (I)) (passed by the Parliament of Ireland) in the same way as the 1813 act had amended the 1689 act.

The whole act was repealed by section 1 of, and the schedule to, the Statute Law Revision Act 1873 (36 & 37 Vict. c. 91), which came into force on 5 August 1873.
