= Centre for Intelligent Design =

Advocacy group in Scotland

- Formation: 2010
- Legal status: Non-profit
- Headquarters: Glasgow, Scotland, UK
- Director: Alastair Noble
- Website: www.c4id.org.uk

The Centre for Intelligent Design is an advocacy group headquartered in Scotland that promotes intelligent design.

== Organisation ==
The Centre for Intelligent Design's activity is organised under a charitable trust governed by the laws of Guernsey, Channel Islands, but (as of October 2010) consists of only a website and an office. The purpose of the centre is not to finance or undertake research into intelligent design, but rather to conduct advocacy and public relations for the idea. Its director, Alastair Noble, is a former school inspector, currently working for CARE, a Christian charity campaigning for more religious education in schools, as its education officer. The centre's president is Norman Nevin, emeritus professor of medical genetics at Queen's University in Belfast, and its vice-president is David Galloway, former president of the Royal College of Physicians and Surgeons.

== Controversy ==
Commenting on the Centre for Intelligent Design, Michael Reiss as Professor of Science Education at the Institute of Education, University of London, said that the overwhelming scientific consensus is that the arguments against the theory of evolution promoted by intelligent design advocates are invalid, and students should not be given a false impression about the subject.

In November 2010 the British Centre for Science Education reported on a potential of the Centre for Intelligent Design to damage education in Scotland as well as in Northern Ireland, due to lack of safeguards against creationism and the power of the creationist organisations.

In April 2011 an article was published in the Scottish newspaper The Herald which said that "critics have pointed to the leaders' fundamentalist Christian backgrounds and the leaps of faith inherent in their logic." Its president was quoted as saying that he believed Adam was a real person, that the universe was created in six days, and that the story of Noah and the Ark was historical. Its director denied that the idea that the initial spark creating the universe was caused by a universal engineer or God was religious.
