= Aveling =

Aveling is a surname, and may refer to:

- Edward Aveling (1849–1898), British comparative anatomist and socialist
- Eleanor Marx (1855–1898), sometimes called Eleanor Aveling
- Francis Aveling (1875–1941), Canadian psychologist and Roman Catholic priest
- Harry Aveling (born 1942), Australian scholar, translator and teacher
- James H. Aveling (1828–1892), British obstetrician, gynaecologist and historian of medicine
- Martin Aveling (born 1982), wildlife artist
- Thomas Aveling (engineer) (1824–1882), English inventor
- Thomas Aveling (minister) (1815–1884), British Congregational minister
- Thomas Tipping Aveling (1771–1820), English Anglican priest
- Valda Aveling (1920–2007), Australian pianist, harpsichordist and clavichordist
