= Thomas Aveling =

Thomas Aveling may refer to

- Thomas Aveling (engineer) (1824–1882), English agricultural machinery pioneer and founder of Aveling & Porter
- Thomas Aveling (minister) (1815–1884), British congregational minister and author
- Thomas Tipping Aveling (1771–1820), English Anglican priest
