= Edward Aveling =

English anatomist, writer and activist (1849–1898)

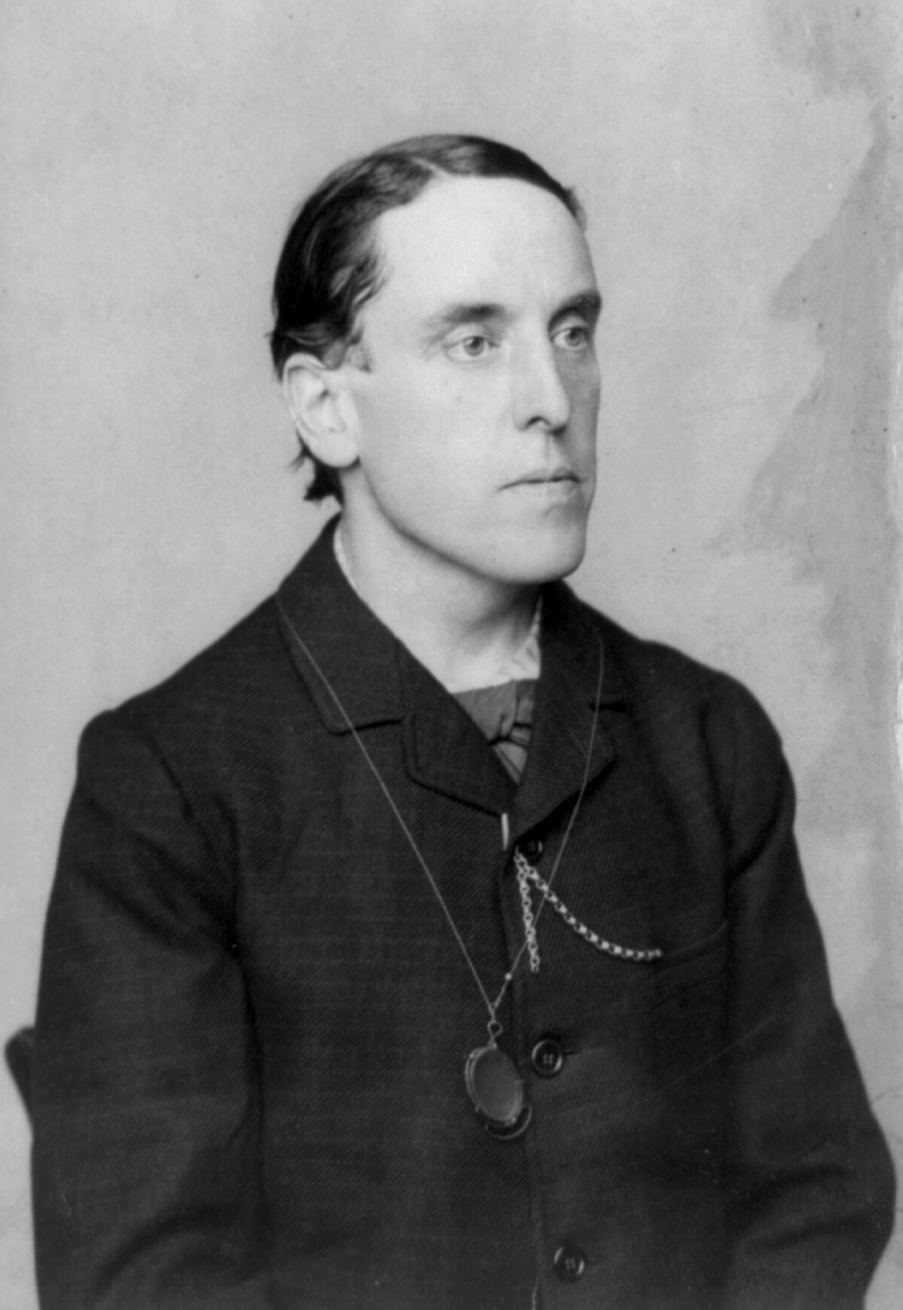
- Aveling in 1886
- Born: Edward Bibbins Aveling; 29 November 1849; London, England
- Died: 2 August 1898 (aged 48); Battersea, London, England
- Other names: E.D., Alec Nelson, T.R. Ernest, Cover-Point, The Cockney Sportsman
- Education: University College London
- Occupations: Comparative anatomist, socialist writer, editor, dramatist, translator of Marx's Capital; botanist, physiologist, zoologist
- Spouses: Isabel Campbell Frank (m. 1872; died 1892) Eva Frye (m. 1897)
- Partner: Eleanor Marx

Edward Bibbins Aveling (29 November 1849 – 2 August 1898) was an English comparative anatomist, botanist and popular spokesman for Darwinian evolution, atheism, and socialism. He was also a journalist, editor, playwright, actor, short story writer and poet. Aveling was the author of scientific works and numerous literary and political pamphlets many that were published (and republished) by The Freethought Publishing Company; he is perhaps best known for his popular work The Student's Darwin (1881) that appeared in their 'International Freethought and Science' series; he also translated the first volume of Karl Marx's Das Kapital and Friedrich Engels' Socialism: Utopian and Scientific.

Aveling was elected vice-president of the National Secular Society from 1880–84, and was a member of the Democratic Federation and then in August 1884 he was elected to the executive council of the Social Democratic Federation, he was also a founding member of the Socialist League and the Independent Labour Party. During the year-long imprisonment of George William Foote for blasphemy, he took over as interim editor for The Freethinker as well as Foote's monthly magazine Progress. With William Morris, he was the sub-editor of Commonweal. He was an organizer of the mass movement of the unskilled workers and the unemployed in the late 1880s unto the early 1890s, and a delegate to the International Socialist Workers' Congress of 1889. For fifteen years, he was the partner of Eleanor Marx, the youngest daughter of Karl Marx, and co-authored many works with her, and co-edited works of Marx. After her tragic death on 31 March 1898 (by suicide, allegedly precipitated by Aveling's secret marriage a year earlier), he continued and published: The Eastern Question by Karl Marx- A Reprint of Letters written 1853–56 dealing with the events of the Crimean War (1898) and Value, Price, and Profit (1898) Both these last works were signed simply: "Edited by Eleanor Marx-Aveling, with a preface by Edward Aveling."

== Biography ==
=== Early years and education ===
Aveling was born on 29 November 1849 in Stoke Newington, in north-east London, England. The fifth of eight children of Reverend Thomas William Baxter Aveling (1815–1884), a Congregationalist minister, and his wife, Mary Ann (died in 1877), daughter of Thomas Goodall, farmer and innkeeper, of Wisbech (now in Cambridgeshire).

In 1863, Aveling attended the West of England Dissenters' Proprietary School in Taunton. He was sent there together with his brother Frederick W. Aveling (1851–1937), who later became headmaster of the same school. There is a record of prizes awarded to him in an old school register from 1863 to 1866. Of particular importance is Aveling's early study of German. The English dissenting colleges laid great emphasis on the study of German higher criticism (in the fields of history, philology, science, and theology), as it was seen to challenge and undermine Anglican orthodoxy.

=== University College London ===
As a medical student at University College London, he was a successful and diligent student, receiving a gold medal in chemistry, a first in practical physiology and histology, and a silver medal in botany. In 1867, he won a medical entrance exhibition of £25. He studied surgery under John Marshall (1818–1891) and the English anatomist Christopher Heath (1835–1905), who was assistant surgeon and teacher of operative surgery at University College Hospital. Aveling trained in minor surgery and the use of medical instruments with Matthew Berkeley Hill (1834–1892), professor of clinical surgery and teacher of practical surgery; and with William Morse Graily Hewit (1828–1893), professor of midwifery at University College and obstetric physician to University College Hospital, he took midwifery and gynecology.

Aveling studied medicine with John Russell Reynolds (1828–1896), who in 1867 had just succeeded Sir William Jenner in the chair of medicine; and clinical medicine (materia medica) under Sydney Ringer (1835–1910). In 1869, he transferred from the medical to the science faculty, winning a £40 exhibition to study botany and zoology in the subject of zoology. It has recently been claimed that it was under the direct influence of Ray Lankester, who also lectured at the associated teaching hospital across Gower Street, University College Hospital, that Aveling made this switch from the medical school to study zoology.

Aveling graduated with a Bachelor of Science (B.Sc.) Honours degree in Zoology in 1870. Thomas Henry Huxley was his examiner; Aveling gave the following account in his obituary of Huxley from 1896: "As I remember well, he came himself to collect the papers that we had written in the afternoon of one of the three examination days. Of the six or seven students who were in the exam, I happened to be the only one who had written for the full three hours that had been set for the exam. When Huxley took my work from me, he said to me very kindly: "I am pleased to see that three hours did not seem too long for you to answer only three questions. I wouldn't be surprised if you are the first on the list." At an early age, his secularist period and not yet a socialist, Aveling's respect for Huxley's literary style remained key: "The scientific precision, the power of generalization, met with in Professor Huxley's works, have not their value lessened by the exquisite style of that distinguished writer." It is not difficult to see the profound influence of Huxley's early conception of Science and Religion (1859) on the young Aveling, with Huxley proclaiming science and religion as "mortal enemies", as well as his passionate project for the so-called "New Reformation", wanting to see "the foot of science on the necks of her enemies."

=== Cambridge ===
From 1870 to 1872, he worked as an assistant or demonstrator to the physiologist Michael Foster in Cambridge. Foster, one of his former teachers at UCL, was then an associate professor at Trinity College, Cambridge. At the same time, Foster was a professor of physiology at the Royal Institute (as was Huxley). On the days that Foster held lectures in London, Aveling accompanied him and prepared at the laboratory all his apparatus and experiments. He wrote that on many days he was in contact with Huxley and the professor of physics John Tyndall: "Quite often I had to borrow apparatuses or reagents from both of them. Tyndall . . . was always more or less unfriendly and either patronizingly condescending, and sometimes downright crude. Huxley, on the other hand, showed himself always as the embodiment of kindness, courtesy and willingness."

=== College of Preceptors ===
Aveling was elected as a member of the College of Preceptors on 25 November 1871. It was one of the first professional organizations for teachers and it pioneered formal training by examination for teachers. Aveling read a paper "On the Teaching of Botany in Schools" at the monthly evening meeting of the College of Preceptors on 12 March 1879. George Henslow was in the chair. His lecture began with the images of working-class children escaping the pollution of the town situated amidst flowers, citing lines from Shelley's "To a Skylark": "faint with too much sweet". His peroration at the end was Darwinian, addressing the apparent perfection of Nature. With the acclaimed Christian Darwinist beside him in the chair, he does, however, refer to "gigantic blunders in the universe". Aveling had not yet publicly emerged as an atheist; that would be four months later. What is remarkable here is his emphasis upon the importance of teaching Charles Darwin in schools in 1879.

=== First marriage ===
On 30 July 1872, Aveling married Isabel "Bell" Campbell Frank (1849–1892), the daughter of a Leadenhall poulterer. The marriage service was conducted by Edward's father at the Union Chapel, Islington. They separated after two years but did not divorce. According to Aveling, the cause of the split was her turning into a 'High Church woman' and their house increasingly crowded with "High Church proclivities and many clergymen" one, a reverend from St. Paul's in Walworth, a Latinist and a member of the Society of the Holy Cross, Isabel had a passionate affair with. Aveling told Charles Bradlaugh that she had admitted this to him and he had previously had the letters to prove this, although much later there were rumours, spread by his brother Frederick, that he had only married her for her money.

=== Lecturer on Comparative Anatomy at London Hospital ===
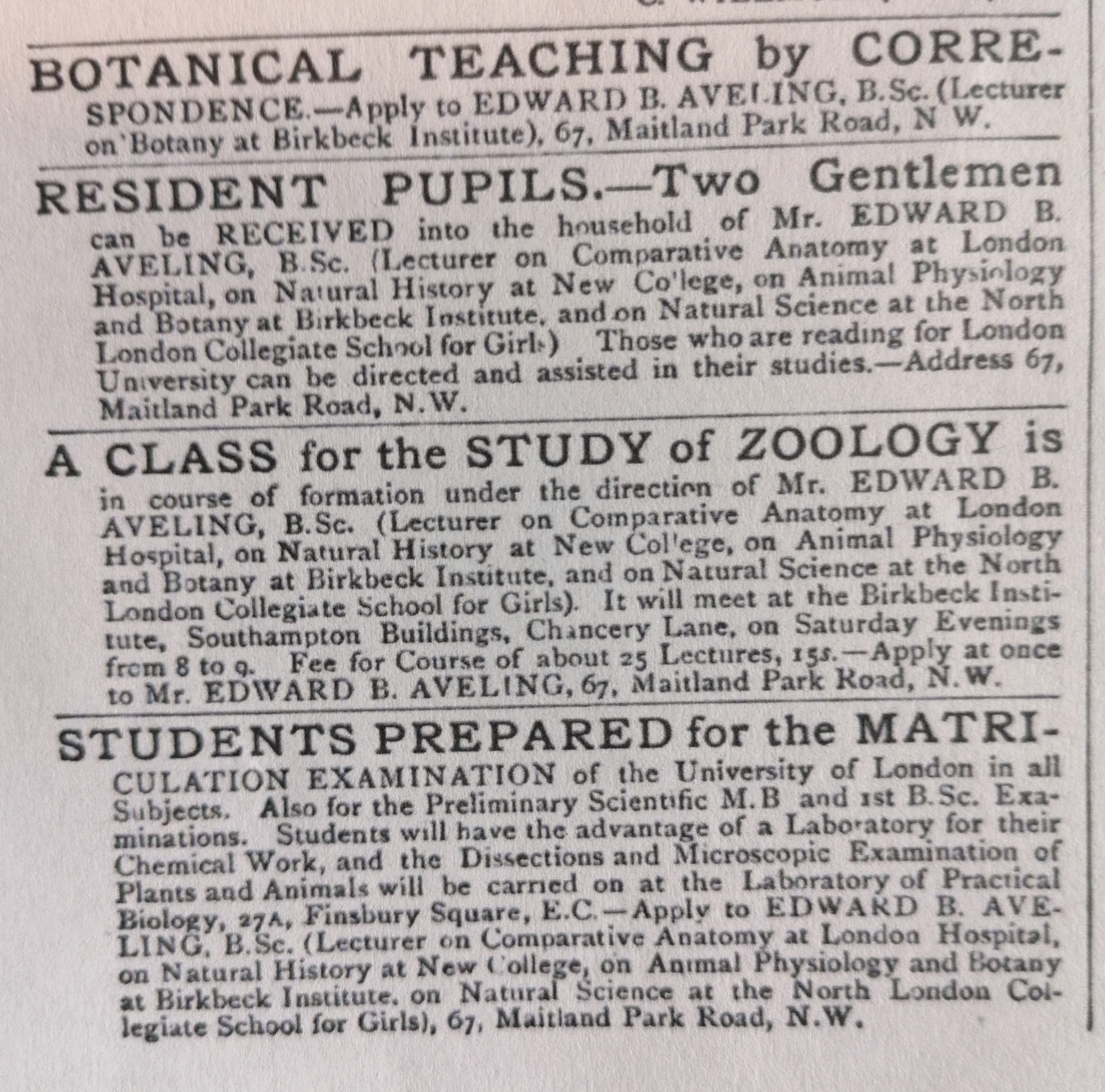
Aveling's teaching adverts in Nature November 1875

Aveling took out four separate column advertisements in Nature (4 November 1875) all grouped together. At this time he had four teaching positions, a Lecturer on Comparative Anatomy at London Hospital, a lecturer on Natural History at New College, London, and lecturer on Animal Physiology and Botany at Birkbeck Institute, also he taught Natural Science at the North London Collegiate School for Girls. Aveling obtained a London D.Sc. in 1876 and he was a lecturer on Comparative Anatomy at the London Hospital from 1875 to 1881. In 1876 he was made a Fellow of the Linnean Society of London. He had been recommended as a Fellow by the botanists George Henslow and Maxwell Tylden Masters, the zoologist James Murie, as well as the biologist St. George Jackson Mivart, who had written On the Genesis of Species (1871). In 1878 Aveling was also made a Fellow of University College London.

Aveling's dismissal from his post was officially announced in the British Medical Journal on 26 November 1881: "The Board of the London Hospital have dismissed Dr. E. B. Aveling from the post of lecturer on comparative anatomy at the medical school of the hospital. Dr. Aveling made a statement of the progress the class had made during his conduct of it, concluding with the assertion that the real reason for his dismissal was his avowal of certain religious and political views of an unpopular nature." It was looked upon as a crass example of the political persecution of secularists, the National Secular Society and their journal The National Reformer that was being extended to their teaching of science at the Hall of Science as well. Charles Bradlaugh, the President of the National Secular Society (NSS) stated clearly: "Dr. E. B. Aveling has been deprived of his lectureship on Comparative Anatomy at London Hospital because he has publicly identified himself with us." Aveling's election in 1880 to Vice-President of the NSS, points towards the most probable grounds for his dismissal, especially with such close proximity to Bradlaugh who was still endeavouring to take up his seat in Parliament as an elected Northampton MP since 1880.

In 1877 (three years after his Botanical Tables), Aveling published his "Physiological Tables, for the use of students". The work consisted of detailed structured tables on food, digestion, absorption, circulation, respiration, secretion, nutrition, the nervous system, sense organs, motor organs, voice and skeleton, amongst others. The introduction was dated September at the London Hospital. Aveling suggested to teachers of Physiology that each of these tables "may serve as the foundation of one or more lectures", and that they provided "all the physiological facts (except those on reproduction and development), required by the Science and Art Department, South Kensington, and by the ordinary medical examining bodies".

In addition to his position at the London Hospital, Aveling was also a prominent lecturer at Thomas Cooke's London School of Anatomy, Physiology, and Operative Surgery (later located at 102 Stamford Street). Founded by the surgeon Thomas Cooke in 1870, the school held the unique position of being the only private medical school in the UK licensed to maintain a dissecting room and recognized to take students during the medical curriculum. Aveling taught Materia Medica, Botany, Chemistry, Physiology, and Comparative Anatomy, and was listed alongside Cooke as a main lecturer in advertisements in The Lancet and the British Medical Journal (BMJ) from 1876 onwards. Aveling shared Cooke's commitment to practical, hands-on anatomical teaching, a pedagogical philosophy that also informed Aveling's work at the Royal Polytechnic Institution. Notably, Aveling continued to lecture at Cooke's school after his controversial dismissal from the London Hospital in 1881, with his name still appearing in BMJ advertisements for the school in 1882. The precise date he left the school remains uncertain, though he is believed to have taught there until circa 1882–1883.

=== New College, London ===
Aveling was in the Arts Faculty at New College London, Hampstead, teaching Chemistry and Natural History as a "Lecturer pro tem". New College London, was a congregational academy founded in 1850 with the merging of three former dissenting academies (Daventry, Highbury, and Homerton) into one. Aveling's father had studied at Highbury College. Aveling's brother Frederick had studied here and without doubt their father played an influential role. Aveling's professorship at New College can be traced back to 1872 and his name is still given teaching Chemistry and Natural History in 1876, although not by 1878, where Chemistry and Natural History are no longer given.

Edwin Lankester, the father of Ray Lankester, and translator of the German botanist Matthias Jakob Schleiden's Principles of scientific botany; or Botany as an inductive science.(1849) had been appointed professor of natural sciences at New College London in 1850 and had held this position for over twenty years, until 1872. Aveling's position was as his successor, and he was therefore essentially training men in science for the Christian Ministry. The course of study at New College extended over five years, divided into a scientific course of two years and a theological course of three years. The first year's course in 'Natural History' sciences consisted of chemistry, mineralogy, and geology. The second year's course, botany, vegetable physiology, zoology, and comparative and human physiology. Throughout these years this would have been very arduous and challenging for him and would have accentuated the differences between religion and science. Illustrating a tradition of sorts, Aveling published his "Botanical Tables, for The Use of Students" (1874) during his tenure at New College, as his introduction clearly shows, and where he states that the tables were only intended to "supplement the actual dissection and observation of plants". Aveling's principal during these years was Reverend Samuel Newth (1821–1898), himself a distinguished scientist who had been a minister at a congregational chapel. Newth had also written elementary textbooks on natural philosophy in the early 1850s, thus together with Edwin Lankester's own writings in this field, it is not difficult to see Aveling carrying on this tradition in his own instructional works. Aveling's laboratory was situated in the tower of New College, from the outset it had been "fitted up with every convenience for chemical and scientific experiments", and Edwin Lankester had been the co-founder of the Quarterly Journal of Microscopical Science (Vol. 1, 1853) that was connected to the Royal Microscopical Society and the laboratory would no doubt have reflected his expertise. The roof of the tower was said to have one of the finest views in London.

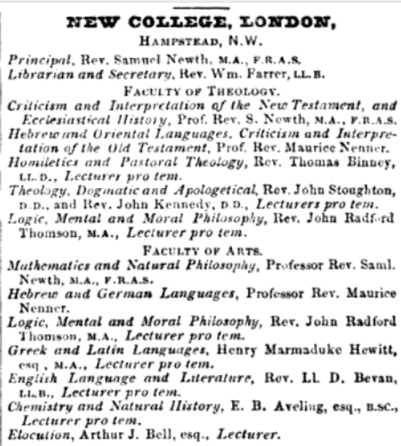
New College, London Faculty list 1873

From 1872 to 1876, Aveling was also a teacher of elementary physics and botany at Frances Buss's North London Collegiate School for Girls. In 1869 Buss became the first woman Fellow of the College of Preceptors. Aveling also examined boys in botany and physiology during June 1872 from the Orphan Working School in Maitland Park. In October 1872 or the following year he gave a lecture at the Orphanage "at the annual prize-giving fête before an audience of patrons and local notabilities. It was on this occasion that he was introduced to Dr. Karl Marx and their young daughter, Eleanor." Aveling later wrote about this encounter in 1897:

Marx I only saw twice in my life, and once in his. The first time I saw him he was alive, the second time he was dead. A good many years ago now, when I was quite a young man, I gave a lecture on "insects and Flowers" at the Orphan Working School, Haverstock Hill, London. It was a fete-day at the school, and besides the children and their teachers a number of those interested in the school were present. As I was a young man of only one or two and twenty, I do not doubt that the lecture was a very bumptious, self-sufficient performance. After it was over a number of the visitors were introduced to me. I only remember three of them. One of the three was a not very tall, but very powerfully built, man, with tremendous leonine head, and the strongest and yet gentlest eyes I think I ever saw. The second was a lady of singular refinement and high-breeding. The third was a young girl. The man was Karl Marx. The woman was his wife, Jenny von Westphalen. The young girl is now my wife. I remember with what kindness and generosity Marx spoke to me. He spoke in very high terms, terms far too high, of the lecture and prophesied all sorts of good things in the way of future work. It was really as if I were the teacher and he the learner. I fear that at that time I did not nearly properly estimate the inestimable value of such criticism from such a man. The next time I saw him he was lying dead on the simple bed at 45 Maitland Park Road, Haverstock Hill. I stood by the side of his corpse, hand-in-hand with my wife.

=== Professorship of English ===
It was announced in January 1879 :"Edward B. Aveling, D.Sc., Fellow of University College, London, has been elected to the Professorship of English at the Royal Academy of Music." and in specialised musical journals "Edward B. Aveling, D.Sc., Fellow of University College, London, has been elected to the professorship of English at the Royal Academy of Music." In August 1882 he was sitting on examining boards for Language. The secretary of the Royal Academy of Music, John Gill, still names Aveling as an examiner for the prize list of July 1883.

Some of Aveling's musical reviews can be found amidst his dramatic notices in his 'Art Corner' in Annie Besant's monthly secularist journal Our Corner (1883–1888). Here also the Royal Academy is mentioned: "Johannes Brahms, facile princeps among classical composers of to-day, has given us recently two new works. The one, a quintett for strings, I heard for the first time at Mr. Henry Holmes' concert at the Royal Academy of Music....I heard it at the hands of Messrs. Holmes, Parker, Gibson, Hill, and Howell."

In November 1882, Aveling heard Carlo Alfredo Piatti perform Beethoven's Trio in G major at St James's Hall, London, accompanied by Wilma Neruda and Ludwig Strauss. Later they played Brahms' Quintet in F minor, where the trio was joined by Louis Ries and Charles Hallé. He attended the premiere of Anton Dvorák's "Stabat Mater" in England; Aveling, the secularist, writes: "Anton Dvorák has caught that which Rossini almost wholly misses—the intense religious tone essential to the subject".

There is a description of a performance of Gilbert and Sullivan's Iolanthe at the Savoy. When Eleanor and Edward came together in 1890 to write the dramatic notices in Ernest Belfort Bax's Time, there is also mention of a Gilbert and Sullivan opera, The Gondoliers. Aveling particularly praised the impresario Carl Rosa (1842–1889) and his company as "a musical missionary" and he was clearly familiar with his work, writing that "He brings the classical compositions of foreign composers within the understanding hearing of English people who only know their own language. He is not only a missionary but an explorer − a sort of Livingstone in art". Aveling had seen at Drury Lane the English composer Arthur Thomas's opera "Esmeralda" (1883), as well as the Scottish composer Alexander Mackenzie's opera "Colomba" (1883). In one review Aveling referred to a performance of Hector Berlioz' opera La Damnation de Faust at the Albert Hall, on Thursday, 7 Feb. 1884, that despite his inability to attend, was clearly a favourite piece of his and he was already familiar with it: "Unfortunately, I could not be there. I know of no piece of music of modern times that moves me so greatly." On 10 April 1886, at Crystal Palace he heard Franz Liszt play and reviewed the concert. A bibliography of Aveling's extensive musical reviews has yet to be compiled.

=== Aveling's secularist credo ===
In June 1879 he applied for the vacant Chair of Comparative Anatomy at King's College London but on finding that adherence to the Church of England was obligatory he did not pursue his application. Why Aveling wished to knock at the door of Anglican King's College is difficult to say, perhaps it was a deliberate affront to the "medical clerisy" or "medical priesthood" there knowing how they relished in rejecting Nonconformist medical minds. In the National Reformer he wrote of his defiant gesture as the son of a religious dissident and he "consigned them to the flames". In an article later that month in the National Reformer (27 July 1879) Aveling published a statement, that has been called his "secularist credo", entitled "Credo Ergo Laborabo" (I believe, therefore I shall work), declaring that he had become a freethinker and atheist: "I desire to make known in a manner as public as possible that I am a free thinker... "

In his secularist embrace of ‘liberty’ and freethinking in 1879 Aveling appeals here to the ideas of John Locke, Jeremy Taylor, John Milton and John Stuart Mill. He writes that he claimed to have held secularist views for two or three years prior to this credo, this has genuine echoes of Shelley's "The Revolt of Islam" a poet he so admired, and his fashioning of "linked armour for my soul, before it might walk forth to war among mankind" Before 27 July he had hidden his identity by signing numerous articles in the National Reformer with the initials "E.D." He had also published some of his articles on Darwin using these same initials. Annie Besant's words of approval and gratitude for this deliverance of a "New Soldier" within the ranks of the army of freethinkers, were as follows: "His language is exquisitely chosen and is polished to the highest extent, so that the mere music of speech is pleasant to the ear. Since to this artistic charm are added scholarship and wide knowledge, with a brilliancy of brain I have not seen surpassed, and a capacity for work without which the intellectual power would be half wasted, our friends will not wonder that we who know him rejoice that our Mistress Liberty has won this new Knight".

Charles Robert Drysdale, founder and first President of the Malthusian League, gave an equally effusive welcome on Aveling's coming out into the open: "We are indeed glad to find another lion hearted combatant added to the ranks of the neo-Malthusians of Great Britain, and one so distinguished as Dr. Aveling has already made himself in the scientific world and in literature. Political economy is the true 'science of the poor.'" Neo-Malthusianism was an accepted principle of secularism (although it resulted in fierce disagreements, resignations and in-fighting within the NSS), especially after the Bradlaugh-Besant blasphemy trial of 1877 and the publication of Charles Knowlton's Fruits of Philosophy, at which Drysdale (and his wife) had given evidence.

=== National Secular Society and the Hall of Science ===
From September 1879 Aveling gave evening science classes every Wednesday and Thursday at the Hall of Science, 142, Old Street, in East London, which was also the headquarters of the National Secular Society (NSS). Aveling's first public lecture in the Hall of Science on 10 August 1879 was on the English poet Percy Bysshe Shelley. The subjects he taught in his science classes were mathematics, inorganic chemistry, elementary botany, and animal physiology. Both his former pupils Hypatia Bradlaugh Bonner and Annie Besant assisted him. Annie Besant wrote in her autobiography:

At the opening of the new year (1879) I met for the first time a man to whom I subsequently owed much in this department of work—Edward B. Aveling, a D.Sc. of London University, and a marvelously able teacher of scientific subjects, the very ablest, in fact, that I have ever met. Clear and accurate in his knowledge, with a singular gift for lucid exposition, enthusiastic in his love of science, and taking vivid pleasure in imparting his knowledge to others, he was an ideal teacher. This young man, in January, 1879, began writing under initials for the National Reformer, and in February I became his pupil, with the view of matriculating in June at the London University, an object which was duly accomplished.

Aveling's chemistry class was taken by 42 people including the sisters Alice and Hypatia Bradlaugh. Aveling's second year was more ambitious. He gave evening classes in elementary botany, advanced physiology, elementary mathematics and advanced chemistry. Following the success of their examination results Aveling made an application to the Science and Art Department for a South Kensington grant. The success of the Hall of Science, with its combination of science and radicalism - the courses were attended by mainly adults of the artisan class and predominantly NSS members - attracted attention.

In 1881–82 (October–May), the Hall of Science started with 212 pupils, all but 44 of whom were NSS members, and at the end of the year of 110 examination entries it produced 32 Firsts, 59 Seconds and only 19 Fails. Encouraged by the examination results in January 1882 Aveling also started a class to prepare candidates for London University matriculation. This state of affairs enraged the establishment anti-secularists and in particular the Conservative MP Sir Henry Tyler, who disliked Bradlaugh, and he brought into question the appropriateness of Aveling's employment with the Science and Art Department of the Government. On 23 August 1881 Tyler asked a question on the floor of the House of Commons to A. J. Mundella, who served in Gladstone's government as Vice-President of the Committee of the Council on Education from 1880 to 1885, if the courses undertaken in the Hall of Science and their teachers had any connections or claims to financial support from the government.

Bradlaugh himself mentioned this state of affairs in December something that he saw as an insidious form of persecution extending to his family and colleagues:

At the present moment there is a notice on the Order Book of the House of Commons for the purpose of preventing Dr. E. B. Aveling, for the purpose of preventing Mrs. Besant, for the purpose of preventing my daughters from teaching, as they are entitled to teach, in this Hall—nay, for the purpose of preventing the building itself from being utilised for educational purposes. Shame ! I should have thought that those who cannot agree with us in religious matters would have been glad to see us endeavouring to educate ourselves.

Undeterred Sir Henry Tyler raised the matter of the "Trinity" (i.e. Bradlaugh, Besant & Aveling) again on 21 March 1882 when he asked Mundella, whether Dr. Aveling and Mrs. Besant are still employed in connection with the Science and Art Department of the Government. He also gave notice that he would ask the Secretary of State for the Home Department, if his attention had been called to "a series of articles recently published in the National Reformer, of which the Junior Member for Northampton [i.e. Bradlaugh himself] and Mrs. Besant are the editors, under the heading of "The Christ of Dr. Aveling," and.... in particular to a passage in the "National Reformer" of 5 March 1882; and, whether he will refer to the Public Prosecutor the question of preferring an indictment for blasphemy against the editors of the "National Reformer?" The hon. Member said, he would hand the extracts to the Clerk at the Table, as they were too horrible to read to the House."

Aveling, Besant, and Bradlaugh's daughters, gave regular accounts of these parliamentary debates and controversies in The National Reformer, and Aveling was thankful for what he called the "gratuitous advertisement" for his science classes at the Hall of Science, saying that enrolments had increased due to all the free publicity. The threats petered out and Henry Butterworth argued that Mundella's refusal to join in the "witch-hunt" on Aveling and his associates reflected much to his credit, he reached the conclusion in his thesis that "This case was a side-issue in the great controversy over the admission of the free-thinker Bradlaugh to the House of Commons, and it involved Dr. Edward Aveling and Mrs. Annie Besant, two of his associates." However, Tyler's charges against George William Foote and the Blasphemy charge in 1883 against The Freethinker did go ahead. In 1880 at their annual conference Aveling was elected vice-president of the National Secular Society. He gave a lecture "On the Relation between Science and Freethought" in which he maintained that most scientists are consciously or unconsciously atheists. This would be a subject that he would discuss in person with Charles Darwin the following year. Aveling had accompanied Bradlaugh into Westminster Hall, at his forcible expulsion from the House of Commons in August 1881. On the Wednesday night there was a public meeting held in the Hall of Science, "Mr. Bradlaugh on entering the hall was enthusiastically cheered..." "Dr. Aveling said the scene enacted in Westminster Palace-yard that day was the most extraordinary ever witnessed, and he admired the patience of the people who had been spectators of it. The police had been engaged in what was a highly illegal act."

=== Aveling as interim editor of Foote's Progress and The Freethinker ===
In 1882, the English secularist George William Foote founded the magazine Progress. A monthly magazine of advanced thought, its sub-editor was Joseph Mazzini Wheeler. Following Foote's imprisonment and Wheeler's tragic illness, Aveling became the editor of this magazine from April 1883-March 1884, it is claimed that he was assisted by Annie Besant, Eleanor Marx and William Archer. Eleanor Marx published in Progress two articles on her father during his editorship, that appeared in May and June 1883. Marx who had died on 14 March 1883. Her first article was biographical, the second "Karl Marx II [Karl Marx's Theory of Value]" explained the theory of surplus value, clearly using unpublished manuscripts, and it has been claimed by Holmes: "Thus Eleanor Marx, became her father's first biographer and posthumous exponent of his economic theory."

Aveling also edited Foote's newspaper, The Freethinker. Aveling became a member of the regular staff of The Freethinker in January 1882. When Foote was imprisoned for blasphemy in 1883 he took over the editorship. The cartoons mainly responsible for Foote being prosecuted in 1882 were stopped by Aveling during his interim editorship, and they were resumed in 1884. Aveling was chiefly answerable for a 'memorial', or petition, calling on Sir William Harcourt to intervene in Foote's case, as Foote himself wrote: "The signatures were procured, at great expense of time and labour, by Dr. E. B. Aveling and an eminent psychologist who desired to avoid publicity." Among the fifty-four names and various editors were: G. J. Romanes, Francis Galton, Herbert Spencer, Henry Sidgwick, George Howard Darwin, Thomas Huxley, Ray Lankester, Leslie Stephen, Professor Tyndall, Professor Alexander Bain, Professor E.S. Beesly, Professor Herbert Foxwell, Professor Robert Adamson, Professor George Croom Robertson, R. H. Moncrieff, and Reverend Charles Beard. Foote said: "I doubt whether such a memorial, signed by so many illustrious men, was ever before presented to a Home Secretary for the release of any prisoners. But it made no impression on Sir William Harcourt, for the reason that the signatories were not politicians, but only men of genius."

=== Political career ===
Aveling's standing as a socialist is best summed up as a translator of volume I of Karl Marx's Capital into English; a member of the Social Democratic Federation from 1884, a founder of the Socialist League (December 1884) and together with William Morris a sub-editor of The Commonweal; an organiser of the mass movement of the unskilled workers and the unemployed in the late 1880s unto the early 1890s; a delegate to the International Socialist Workers' Congress of 1889 and a Chairman of the Central Committee for a Legal Eight Hours' Day. As the husband of Eleanor Marx-Aveling (and thus acknowledged as Marx's son-in-law) this standing was historically cemented, particularly on the American lecture tour of 1886–87 and their tumultuous reception there. As Eleanor herself described him "the only scientific man among the Freethought leaders", in some respects he came to be seen as the embodiment of the English scientific socialist. In November 1882 he was elected to represent Westminster on the London School Board. Huxley had been elected to the LSB in 1870. As a candidate, Aveling received the cross-party support of the SDF and NSS, and he advocated free elementary schooling for the working class. His commitment to teaching Darwinism in the classroom was already well known. In 1883, Aveling became the partner of Eleanor "Tussy" Marx, the daughter of Karl Marx, and was ushered into the inner circle of British socialism.

On 17 March 1883, Aveling attended the funeral of Karl Marx at Highgate Cemetery in London together with Eleanor, Charles Longuet, Paul Lafargue, Friedrich Engels, Helena Demuth, Georg Lochner, Friedrich Lessner, Wilhelm Liebknecht, Carl Schorlemmer, Ernest Radford, Gottlieb Lembke and Sir Ray Lankester. The following year, Aveling gave a speech on 16 March 1884 at Highgate Cemetery to celebrate the anniversary of Marx's death together with the proclamation of the Paris Commune. It had to be held outside, as the gates had been closed and were defended by a force of 500 police. Eleanor Marx described his speech so: "The first speaker was Dr. Edward Aveling whose splendid speech touched the hearts of all his hearers—who, thanks to his lungs, were many. He said they had assembled to celebrate the memory of a dead man, and for the sake of a living cause—the cause which that man had laboured for all his life, and whose triumphs his clear eyes had foreseen. That cause nothing could prevent from triumphing, but its speedy triumph depended upon us—upon the workers of all countries, upon our solidarity, our energy, our self-sacrifice. After Dr. Aveling, Frohme, the representative of the German Social Democrats, spoke—and spoke admirably." In her regular article "Record of the International Popular Movement", concerning England she described him in these terms: "Among the Secularists good work is being done too, Dr. Edward Aveling—the only scientific man among the Freethought leaders—working hard for "the cause." He has given successful Socialist lectures in Manchester and Birmingham, and is shortly to visit Liverpool."

On 20 April 1884, Aveling delivered a speech on "Socialism and Freethought" at the Baskerville Hall in Birmingham. In early 1884 Aveling and Eleanor Marx joined the DF and they were later both elected to the executive council of the Social Democratic Federation, but the couple separated from the SDF at the end of the year along with William Morris, Belfort Bax, Robert Banner, J. Cooper, W.J. Clarke, Joseph Lane, J. L. Mahon and Samuel Mainwaring. This was the celebrated acrimonious split or schism which then ultimately formed the Socialist League. Henry Hyndman's jealousy of Aveling has been noted by both E. P. Thompson and Philip Henderson: "But Hyndman made no secret of the fact that he regarded Eleanor Marx and Aveling as nothing but emissaries of Engels and as representing the foreign element in British socialism. He was also jealous of Aveling's abilities as a theoretician, for Aveling was a brilliant scientist, a Fellow of University College, Vice-President of the National Secular Society, a member of the London School Board for Westminster, and the author of many books on secularism and Darwinism."

In his correspondence at the time (particularly with Andreas Scheu and James Leigh Joynes) Morris explained how Hyndman's behaviour towards the Avelings was atrocious and unbearable. Hyndman had accused Eleanor of forgery, and wanted Aveling to resign from the SDF as he had done so from the NSS because of Bradlaugh's charges of financial mismanagement or, as Morris puts it: "the malversation of funds". His hatred went deeper. When Morris and the SDF executive wanted more control over the journal Justice, he had written to Morris on 27 November that "the change is especially wanted by the very persons—Dr. Aveling and Mrs. Aveling—who, owing to Bax's weakness, ruined To-Day by their prejudices and advertising puffery of themselves". Before their last meeting of the SDF, Morris and Aveling visited Frederick Engels at 122, Regent's Park Road to discuss their proposed paper The Commonweal. Morris's account of this is given in a letter to Scheu:

Aveling summoned me to go up to Engels on Saturday important business: I was uncomfortable rather wondering what it was. Aveling told me it was about the 'Commonweal'. that Engels thought we should have no chance of carrying on a weekly, & had better try a monthly at first at any rate. Aveling seemed rather inclined to stick to the weekly. I saw Engels who said that we were weak in political knowledge & journalistic skill, and that we should find it very difficult to carry on a weekly paper really well, without stuffing it with rubbish and so on. I must confess that though I don't intend to give way to Engels his advice is valuable; and on this point I am inclined to agree.

The first number with Morris as editor and Aveling as sub-editor appeared at the beginning of February 1885. Eleanor contributed regularly to The Commonweal. She resumed her gathering of news items from abroad, now under the title "Record of the Revolutionary International Movement", having used a similar title contributing to To-day: monthly magazine of scientific socialism. In April 1884, Engels accepted Aveling's offer to help in translating the first volume of Karl Marx's book Das Kapital.

As he was busying himself with the translation Aveling gave four lessons on Marx's Capital in a series of classes to the Westminster branch of the SDF between November–December 1884. Although Aveling had proposed his lectures in September, it was only in mid-October that the executive of the SDF finally "approved the action of the Westminster branch in establishing 'gratuitous Social Science classes" However, after both Aveling and Eleanor left the SDF for the new Socialist League, he immediately proposed re-running the lessons in an expanded form, into two series of eight lessons, intended to summarize Volume 1 of Capital. Aveling's lectures were strongly supported by William Morris.

The serial publication of Aveling's "Lessons in Socialism, I. -XI." (1885) in The Commonweal was interrupted by the first American journey. These lessons had tremendous significance for the English working class movement such that a full year before the publication of the English translation of Capital it was not unusual to read the following: "Leicester sends interesting report of lectures by Eleanor Marx-Aveling and G. B. Shaw. The Branch is about to form a class for the study of Economics on the basis of Karl Marx, with Aveling's " Lessons " as text-book." In his first Lesson on Scientific Socialism, Edward Aveling acknowledged how he had become generally known for his work on Darwin: "The object of this article, and of those that may follow it, is to give some evidence of the fact that Socialism is based on grounds as scientific and as irrefragable as the theory of Evolution. But, as one who is mainly known to the general public as a student and interpreter of Charles Darwin, I cannot refrain from saying that precisely the same methods of observation, recordal, reflection and generalisation that have made his ideas convincing to me have, as applied to history and economics, convinced me of the truth of Socialism. Again and again we hear sneers at scientific Socialism. These are, as a rule, forthcoming from those whose ignorance of Science and of Socialism are on a par. In some rare cases, however, the contempt is poured on us and on a greater than us, ours, by those who ought to know, and in a few cases do know, better."

The decision to change The Commonweal from a monthly to a weekly meant that Aveling could not continue his role as sub-editor. He published the following apology: "AN EXPLANATION. The change of the Commonweal from a monthly to a weekly prevents my retaining the responsible position of one of its editors, as the necessary demands of a weekly on an editor's time can only be met by those in relatively more fortunate positions. The amount of time and work given by me to the paper in its new form will be not less than have been given heretofore. Edward Aveling."

In 1891 Aveling rewrote and published these lessons as The Student's Marx. In Capital: A Critical Analysis of Capitalist Production. Vol. I. (1887) he translated the chief historical and narrative parts: Part III. The Production of Absolute Surplus-Value. Chapter X. (The Working-Day, sects. i-vii), Chapter XI. (Rate and Mass of Surplus-Value), Part VI. Wages. Chapters XIX. (The Transformation of the Value (and respectively the Price) of Labour-Power into Wages, Chapter XX. (Time-Wages), Chapter XXI. (Piece-Wages), Chapter XXII. (National Difference of Wages), the last part of Part VII. The Accumulation of Capital. Chapter XXIV., Chapter XXV. (The General Law of Capitalist Accumulation), all of Part VIII. The So-called Primitive Accumulation. Chapters XXVI. -XXXIII., and the forewords by Marx to the first (London, 25 July 1867) and second (London, 24, 1873) German editions. Eleanor Marx worked in the British Museum revising the notes. Aveling also translated Engels' Socialism: Utopian and Scientific (1892) a work first published in 1880 that Sir Isaiah Berlin described as "the best brief autobiographical appreciation of Marxism by one of its creators".

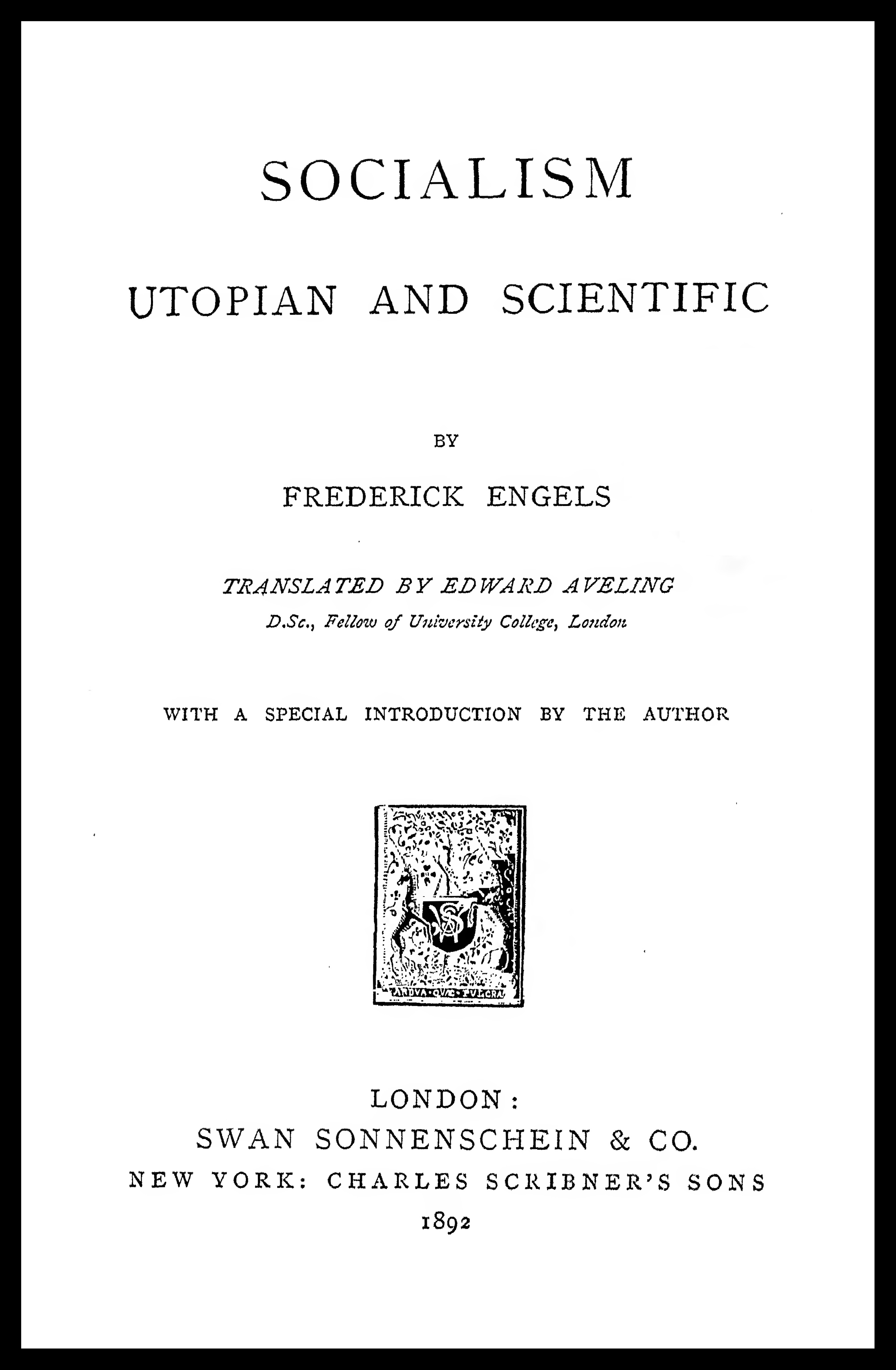
Title page of the first English-language edition of Engels' Socialism: Utopian and Scientific, published in London by Swan Sonnenschein & Co. in 1892

Aveling and Eleanor both participated in two important free-speech demonstrations, namely at Dod Street on 20 September 1885 and the free-speech demonstration at Stratford on 29 May 1886. Both appeared as witnesses in the magistrate's court for William Morris who had been arrested at Dod Street. Aveling gave an account of 29 May meeting in The Commonweal under the title Socialists and Free Speech His last lecture in England before leaving for America was entitled "How to bring about the Social Revolution." delivered at Arlington Hall, Rathbone Place, in Oxford Street, on 20 August.

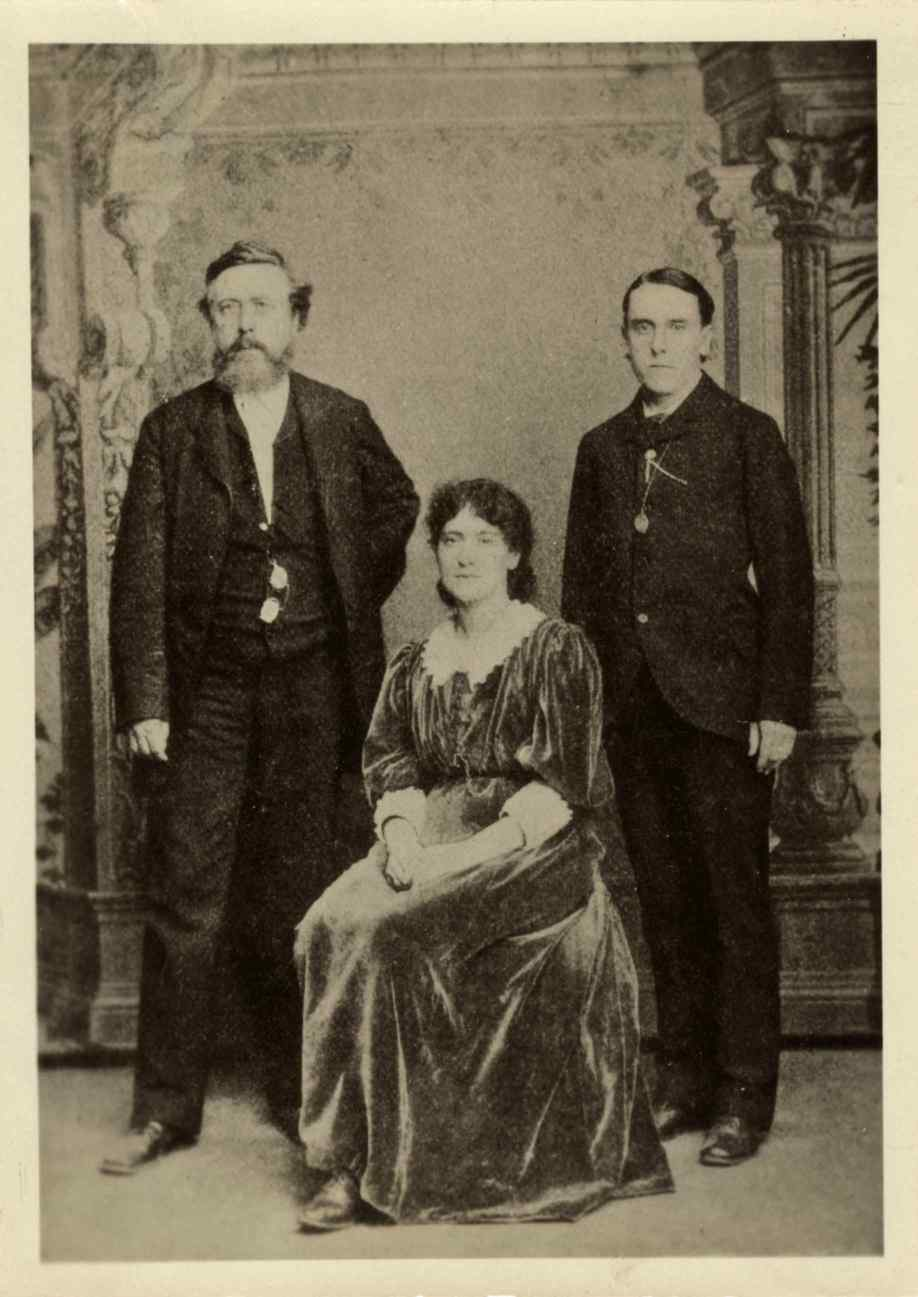
Wilhelm Liebknecht, Eleanor Marx and Aveling in North America, 1886

=== The American journey of agitation 1886 ===
In 1886, Eleanor Marx and Aveling travelled to New York on the SS City of Chicago arriving on 31 August to tour the United States and to campaign for the Socialist Labor Party of America. Wilhelm Liebknecht arrived in New York a little later to raise money for the German Social Democrats, who were suffering under the Anti-Socialist Laws. August Bebel had also been invited but had to decline because of health issues. Engels had written to Bebel in January 1886 suggesting he make this trip: "It might, in fact, be a very pleasant experience. For Tussy and Aveling have been corresponding with American free-thinkers about the possibility of a trip to that country, and would like to combine it with yours. They expect to hear within the next 3 or 4 weeks. If it comes off, the four of you would make agreeable travelling companions." On 30 September 1886, the three spoke at Brommer's Union Park in front of twenty-five thousand people."Dr Aveling and his wife made addresses in English, and Herr Liebknecht spoke in German"

The Workmen's Advocate described his speech so in an article entitled "A Hearty Welcome. Twenty-five Thousand People Greet Liebknecht and the Avelings": "Then Dr. Aveling stood up before the cheering crowd. He spoke clearly and deliberately, expressing his gratification at the manner of their reception. Impressing it upon the minds of his hearers that socialism intended to change the present condition of society by organization and education. Noticing the array of policemen present Dr. Aveling said: "I hope the police will go back to their employers and tell them that a socialist meeting needs no police. We can preserve order without their presence." He complimented the Germans for their zeal in the cause, and declared that the American workmen would soon feel the necessity for cooperating in the work of reforms."

The Avelings wrote a series of articles for The Workmen's Advocate that closely followed with detailed reports of the "Propaganda Tour", articles on conditions of life in the United States. Many of these were later revised and incorporated into their book, The Working Class Movement in America. All three defended the anarchists convicted of conspiracy after the Chicago Square Haymarket riots of 4 May 1886, the so called Haymarket affair. Four anarchists were convicted of throwing a bomb that killed one policeman: August Spies, Albert R. Parsons, George Engel, and Adolph Fischer who were hung on 11 November 1887. Louis Lingg who was also condemned, committed suicide in his jail cell beforehand. According to the historian James R. Green, Liebknecht and the Avelings even visited the Cook county jail where they were being held.

The Haymarket incident has been described as "the first major 'red scare' in American history, (that) produced a campaign of 'red-baiting' which has rarely been equalled." The socialists, usually lumped together with the anarchists despite their mutual and intense antagonisms, became easy targets for vicious attacks by editors, politicians and professional patriots. The Chicago Times wrote that the Avelings were unwelcome in Chicago and they feared a revolutionary repeat of the events; some papers were writing encouraging violence against them, with headlines such as: "Dr. Aveling and Wife. The Proper Sort of Reception to a Pair of Dangerous Socialists." It was declared: "Dr. Aveling, the English Socialist who has come to this country to rescue the Chicago Anarchists from the gallows...", Eleanor was called his "vitriolic spouse", and any respectable Americans should have nothing to do with these "firebrands of the Aveling-Liebknecht variety". Some editors of American newspapers after his return to England went so far as to put Aveling's name and August Spies in the same headline. Edward and Eleanor became "The London pair of anarchists" and "the pair of apostles" in the yellow press. At a meeting on 8 November at the Chicago Aurora Turner Hall, Aveling was quoted as saying:

"Your newspapers," he said, "have not only called us names, they have misrepresented us. From the outset they have attributed to us views that we have never held… Now these same newspapers… have further been doing everything they possibly can to get public opinion so biased against the men that are now in jail… I am a journalist myself, and I tell you frankly that in all my experience I have never seen anything so wicked, anything so disgraceful as the conduct of your Chicago papers in respect to that trial, and in their attempts to vitiate public opinion since. I tell you that I do not hold the same views as the anarchists, but I should be less than a man if I did not in this huge meeting make it my first business to say that if those men are hanged it is the Chicago Times and Tribune that will have hanged them."

Between September and December 1886 they lectured in New York, St. Louis, Baltimore, Detroit, Milwaukee, Kansas City, Cincinnati, Pittsburgh, Bridgeport, Minneapolis and many other cities including Chicago. Aveling took with him his "Rand & MacNally" travel guides, which he described as "the "Bradshaws" of the States" After their return to London on 4 January 1887, they wrote a book for English readers detailing the situation of the left-wing political movement and trade unions in the US, which they said was populated by "unconscious socialists," people who shared socialist values but disclaimed socialist ideas. Aveling and Marx wrote:

The mass of American Workers had scarcely any more conception of the meaning of Socialism than had 'their betters.' They also had been grievously misled by capitalist papers and capitalist economists and preachers. Hence it came to pass that after most of our meetings we were met by Knights of Labour, Central Labour Union men, and members of other working-class organisations, who told us that they, entering the place antagonists to Socialism as they fancied, had discovered that for a long time past they had been holding its ideas.

On 21 December, Aveling had spoken at a mass demonstration of the American SLP in New York and suggested that the SLP and the Knights of Labour should merge. A few days later at a party meeting of the SLP, Aveling repeated this idea that was rejected by the SLP chairman Wilhelm Rosenberg, it led to a serious rift and Aveling charged Rosenberg with pursuing "German-speaking sectarianism". Rosenberg retaliated and the SLP initiated the charges of overspending that would have serious repercussions for Aveling's reputation.

During his time in the Socialist League, Aveling wrote and translated various socialist texts but nonetheless remained unpopular in the movement, the object of a steady stream of gossip and accusations as a result of the first America trip, and the charges of financial impropriety that had been raised against him. Aveling's revolutionary notoriety had also attracted attention in Germany. Harald Wessel has published a photo of a receipt for $560 dated 30 November 1886, that is held at the secret archive of the Prussian Ministry of the Interior. Otto von Bismarck hired the Pinkerton Detective Agency to spy on Wilhelm Liebknecht and the Avelings.

Aveling gave his own individual account "notes" of this first American journey that appear to have had less attention giving to it, presumably because it appeared after his second one from 1888, and has escaped the notice of biographers. "An American Journey by Edward Aveling." (New York:, Lovell, Gestefeld & Company, 1892), is an unusual document, that from the beginning has a theatrical feel to it. The introduction also says:

The writer of the notes upon America that follow left Liverpool on 31 August 1886, and returned to Liverpool on 3 January 1887. During the fifteen weeks' stay in the United States, forty-four towns in all were visited, and in his capacity as lecturer, journalist, and dramatic critic, the writer came into contact with a great number of Americans of all grades of society, and all shades of opinion. He only claims for his notes that they are the unprejudiced record, made at the time and on the spot, of things as they appeared to him. He is conscious that in many cases they are the results of first impressions; but, at all events, first impressions are more frequent than any other, and it may not be useless for Americans to see, not now for the first time, how they strike a stranger coming in their midst.

Almost the whole of these sketches are reprints from articles sent to England during the writer's stay in America. He desires to express his thanks to-the editors of the New York World, Boston Herald, Topical Times, Court and Society Review, Journalist, Pall Mall Gazette, and Journal of Education, of London, and the Sunday Chronicle, of Manchester, for permission to use his contributions to their respective journals.

Eleanor hardly appears in his account, and is only mentioned a few times. He refers to her in some places as "Saccharissa". This was also the nickname that the poet Edmund Waller (1606–87) gave for Lady Dorothy Sidney, Countess of Leicester who was the subject of his youthful love poems, the so-called Sacharissa cycle or the love-songs to Sacharissa, why Aveling chose an additional "c" for Eleanor is unclear. The following remark is a particularly fascinating one: "My readers may smile at my enthusiasm, but I am bound to place on record the fact that Buffalo Bill produced upon me on my first meeting him the effect that has been produced on me by two other men, and by two other men only, in my life. Those two are Charles Darwin and Henry Irving."

On their return, the Avelings stayed with Engels working on the translation of Das Kapital and they wrote about America, co-authored articles appeared in "Die Neue Zeit" and in "To-Day" on the Chicago anarchists. On 23 March 1887, Aveling gave a lecture on "Socialism in America" at Clerkenwell in the Hall of the Socialist League, 13 Farringdon Road, E.C., it was reported "to a large and attentive audience; good discussion followed." On 6 April, Eleanor also gave a talk there on "Socialism in Europe and America". On 11 April 1887, Aveling and Eleanor Marx gave a speech against the passage of the Anti-Coercion bill and for Irish independence at a rally of over 100,000 people in Hyde Park, London. On 19 May 1887 Aveling gave a lecture on "Radicalism and Socialism" at The Communist Club, that was then situated at 49, Tottenham Street.

In August 1987, the Avelings had a holiday in Stratford-on-Avon, renting out a cottage, and the two of them joyfully immersed themselves in Shakespearean life: "We have been over his home, and seen the old guild Chapel...and the old grammar school—unchanged—whither he went "unwillingly to school"; and his grave in Trinity Church, and Ann Hathaway's cottage, still just as it was when Master Will went a-courting, and Mary Arden's cottage at Wilecote—the prettiest place of all."

In August 1888, the branch to which Aveling and Marx belonged separated from the anarchist-dominated Socialist League in favour of an independent existence as the Bloomsbury Socialist Society. Both Aveling and Eleanor participated in 13 November 1887 "Bloody Sunday" at Trafalgar Square, London. On 7 December 1887, Aveling lectured on "Despotism from a Socialist Standpoint" at the Clerkenwell Hall of the Socialist League.

=== Second American journey of 1888 ===
Aveling's second journey was intentionally dramatic. According to Holmes: "Buoyed up by the positive reception for his adaptation of Hawthorne's The Scarlet Letter, Edward thought he'd try his luck at conquering the American stage. He told Eleanor he had been invited to put on three of his plays in New York, Chicago and 'God knows where else besides' (Engels)." What Friderich Engels called a flying visit ("eine Spritztour"), primarily undertaken to see his nephew, went off quietly and was in fact conducted with deliberate discretion so as to avoid attracting the attention of German socialist circles in New York. Engels, accompanied by Karl Schorlemmer, Eleanor, and Aveling, departed on 9 August aboard the SS City of Berlin. Upon their arrival in New York on 17 August 1888, the Avelings took up residence at the St. Nicholas Hotel on Broadway. In a letter to Laura Lafargue, Eleanor noted that Edward "will... have to take care of theatre rehearsals for the next few days.") By 27 August, the party had moved on to Boston "where they remained several days. They next travelled by way of Niagara Falls to Toronto, then by boat to Montreal, and from Montreal they returned to New York via Plattsburg. On September 19 the party sailed back to Europe." During their stay, they visited the Concord Reformatory, a penal institution. Additional details are furnished by Struik, who, in his article, cites correspondence from the Institution's superintendent. As Struik reports: "Mr. John C. Dolan, the present Superintendent of the Reformatory, had the kindness to write me the following note, dated Jan. 20, 1948: 'Our records show that on August 30, 1888, the Massachusetts Reformatory was favoured with a visit from Edward Aveling, D.Sc., the noted Socialist leader of London, England, and his wife; Professor C. Schorlemmer of Owens College, Manchester, England, and Mr. Frederick Engels, Essayist of London, England.' "

Their itinerary can be discerned from Engels' correspondence with Sorge. "Today Aveling is finishing his whole work in America. The remaining time is free. Whether we go to Chicago is still uncertain, for the rest of the program we have plenty of time." What this work is, or Engels' programme consisted of, is uncertain, but presumably theatrical as there is also mention of a production in Chicago of one of Aveling (Alec Nelson's) plays. After leaving the Socialist League, Aveling became active in the National Union of Gasworkers and General Labourers of Great Britain and Ireland, founded in 1889 for whom he served as an auditor. Aveling was chairman of the Central Committee for a Legal Eight Hours' Day. He gave many lectures on the legal eight hours' day. The secretaries of the Committee were W. W. Bartlett and T. E. Wardle. When Charles Bradlaugh died in 1891 as a Liberal MP for Northampton, Aveling was encouraged to stand as a candidate by the Social Democratic Federation in Northampton and the Gasworkers' union. Problems arose with raising a sum for the necessary financial deposit and Hyndman's treachery.

At the beginning of 1892, Aveling was closely working with Engels on his translation of Socialism: Utopian and Scientific: "spent the whole of this morning in conference with Aveling, sorting out his translation of Entwicklung des Sozialismus". Friedrich Engels in a letter to Conrad Schmidt, London 12 September 1892, had read an essay of his in Die Neue-Zeit and had written: "If there were a review over here that would take it, I would, with your permission, get Aveling to translate it under my supervision." Following the Bradford TUC summit in January 1893 Eleanor and Edward toured the Black country, including Dudley and Wolverhampton. Aveling in Scotland addressed socialist meetings in Aberdeen on 10 and 12 June 1892.

Aveling assisted John Lister in his campaign as a candidate for the ILPs first parliamentary seat at the Halifax by-election in February 1893. Aveling writing political reports for theVolks-Zeitung. Engels somewhat critical: "The masses are unmistakably in motion; you are getting the details from Aveling's somewhat longwinded reports in the Volkszeitung." In April/May 1893, Aveling was ill and went to Hastings to recuperate. Edward, Eleanor, and Engels attended The International Socialist Workers Congress, Zürich 1893 that met later that year from 6 to 13 August. Edward and Eleanor then moved to 7 Gray's Inn Square; after which, Aveling went to the Isles of Scilly (St Mary's) for seven weeks (October/November) for convalescence for his kidney problems. He also wrote a series of travel articles for Robert Blatchford's, weekly socialist newspaper "The Clarion" using the name 'Alec Nelson'. On his return Eleanor was horrified to discover that his abscess had grown significantly, as she graphically wrote to her sister Laura, and sent for a doctor. In March 1895, Edward and Eleanor went to Hastings for health reasons. Eleanor was concerned and informed Liebknecht that they were taking lots of fresh air: "Still, he is not very strong yet."

At the end of June 1895, Edward and Eleanor joined Engels in Eastbourne, who was suffering from throat cancer. According to Holmes, Eleanor and Engels "discussed Edward's nomination as a parliamentary candidate by the Independent Labour Party. The nomination came from the Glasgow Central branch of the ILP. Engels asked 'Tussy' for all the papers and information and read them assiduously. He advised Edward to refuse the nomination as he surmised, correctly, that it was a political trap. " Soon after returning from Eastbourne, Edward and Eleanor left their Gray's Inn Square abode and moved to a country cottage, Green Street Green, at Orpington in Kent. Aveling spoke at Friedrich Engels' funeral on 10 August 1895 (together with Samuel Moore, Herr Schlachtendal, Wilhelm Liebknecht, Paul Lafargue, August Bebel, Edward Anseele, Van der Goes, and the Russians Vera Zasulich (1849–1919) and Feliks Volkhovsky (1846–1914). The cremated ashes of Engels were cast into the sea on 27 August 1895 at Eastbourne, near Beachy Head lighthouse. Eleanor, Edward, Friedrich Lessner and Eduard Bernstein were in the boat on what was a very stormy day.

In September 1895, Edward and Eleanor were in Scotland, addressing SDF and ILP branches in Edinburgh, Dundee, Glasgow, Blantyre and Greenock, returning on the 15th. On 14 December, the Avelings moved into an opulent house, "The Den" at 7 Jew's Walk, a house that could boast having both gas and electricity.

Aveling was a founding member and was elected to the National Administrative Council of the Independent Labour Party by the 1893 Conference which established the organisation. Friedrich Engels was optimistic and encouraging about this, writing to Sorge. "Aveling was right to join and to accept a seat on the Executive. If the petty private ambitions and intrigues of the London would-be-greats are slightly held in check here and the tactics do not turn out too wrong-headed, the Independent Labour Party may succeed in detaching the masses from the Social-Democratic Federation and in the provinces from the Fabians too, and thus forcing unity." Aveling's communications with Engels at this time as revealed in Engels' letter to Bebel, show an astonishing form of political intimacy: "I continue. What Aveling told me confirms the suspicion I already had, namely, that Keir Hardie secretly cherishes the wish to lead the new party in a dictatorial way, just as Parnell led the Irish, and that moreover he tends to sympathise with the Conservative Party rather than the Liberal opposition." He left that group to rejoin the Marxist Social Democratic Federation in 1896, despite his long-standing personal and political quarrel with SDF leader Henry Hyndman. In the summer of 1897, Edward and Eleanor travelled to Paris.

=== Aveling as a Playwright ===
In novels and plays we always want the author's personality to be merged into that of his characters.

— Aveling

When Aveling left university, he allegedly became manager of a "company of strolling players" and later, "became established as a dramatic critic (under the name, "Alec Nelson"), and he wrote several "curtain-raisers" and one-act plays." Examples of his dramatic criticism, can be found in Progress A Monthly Magazine.(1883–1885), edited by G. W. Foote (Aveling took over as Interim Editor of Progress from April 1883 to February 1884), there were frequently reviews of plays, as well as two articles on Henry Irving. His many contributions to Annie Besant's Freethought journal Our Corner. In Ernest Belfort Bax and James Leigh Joynes' To-Day: The Monthly Magazine of Scientific Socialism (1884–85), in which Aveling reviewed, amongst others, dramatic works on Ibsen and Shakespeare. Of particular importance are the "Dramatic Notes" that were published in E. Belfort Bax's monthly shilling journal Time; they were written together by Edward and Eleanor from January 1890 to March 1891 and were always signed "Alec Nelson and E M A." Their first joint review of "La Tosca" in English at the Garrick Theatre, London, was prefixed with a declaration of critical intent from them both:

In these notes, the attempt will be made to write upon plays criticisms that are the conjoint judgment of two people. And these two people will be a man and a woman, whose opinions, however generally at one they may be, are at least certain to present any variations that may be essentially due to sex-difference. Whatever is the result of this method of working, it has, at least, the recommendation of novelty, as this is, as far as we know, the first serious attempt at the collaboration in criticism of a man and a woman.

Further examples of his dramatic criticism can be found in his An American Journey (1892) in Chap. XVIII on American Theatres. He wrote more than ten successful plays, including an adaptation of Nathaniel Hawthorne's The Scarlet Letter that was brought out at the Olympic on 5 June 1888.

Aveling visited Salem, Massachusetts—which he compared with Stratford-upon-Avon—and gave an account of his visit, re-treading the life and paths of Nathaniel Hawthorne's work, "At Salem, as at Stratford, times and again, at places and places, no word should be spoken." By August 1888, he was supervising the mounting of three different plays in New York, Chicago, and in the words of Engels "God knows where besides". His last known piece was Judith Shakespeare, adapted from William Black's novel, and performed at the Royalty on 6 February 1894. The following plays and the dates of the first performances are determined according to Chushichi Tsuzuki and Deborah Lavin:

- Edward Aveling: True Hearts [comedy] 9 December 1877.
- Edward Aveling: The Tale of Beryn.
- Alec Nelson: A Test. London, 15. December 1885.
- Alec Nelson: As in a Looking Glass. London 1887.
- Alec Nelson: By the Sea London 25. November 1887. This was Aveling's free adaptation of the French poet and novelist, André Theuriet's play Jean-Marie, when it was performed in 1887, Eleanor played the heroine.
- Alec Nelson: The Love Philtre. Torquay January 1888.
- Alec Nelson: Scarlet Letter. London 5. June 1888.

Frederick Engels wrote to Eleanor's sister, Laura Larfargue, to ask her if she would be attending the matinée of Aveling's play. The letter provides a good background to his work as a dramatist, one that Engels clearly had great confidence in:

…and surely you ought to be present at Edward's great dramatic triumph on the 5th of June when his dramatisation of N. Hawthorne's Scarlet Letter is to be brought out [for the first time]at a matinée. Of Edward's remarkable preliminary successes in the dramatic line you will have heard. He has sold about half a dozen or more pieces which he had quietly manufactured; some have been played in the provinces with success, some he has brought out here himself with Tussy at small entertainments, and they have taken very much with the people that are most interested in them, viz. with such actors and impresarios as will bring them out. If he has now one marked success in London, he is a made man in this line and will soon be out of all difficulties. And I don't see why he should not, he seems to have a remarkable knack of giving to London what London requires

- Alec Nelson: For Her Sake. New and original drama in one act. Produced for the first time, Friday afternoon, 22 June 1888, at the Olympic Theatre. This may have been first performed a little later as Engels had written to F. A. Sorge: "Aveling is back in London for a play that is to be performed tonight—his fifth, while his sixth will probably be performed next week. There can be no doubt that, by devoting himself to drama, 'He has struck oil', as the Yankees say."
- Alec Nelson: The Landlady. London 4. April 1889.[comedietta]
- Alec Nelson: Dregs. London 16. May 1889.
- Alec Nelson: The Jackal. London 28. November 1889.
- Alec Nelson: Madcap. London 17. October 1890.
- Alec Nelson: The Frog. London October 1893.
- Alec Nelson: Judith Shakespeare. London February 1894.

Aveling also prepared a fairy extravaganza for Christmas 1889 entitled "Snow White" to be included among the dramatis personae were allegedly seven dwarfs. The theatre manager Willie Edouin was responsible at the Strand theatre. It can be said that politics and arts always coalesced, especially during the period of the Social Democratic Federation and their so called "Art Evenings" at which William Morris and Aveling gave readings and George Bernard Shaw played piano duets with Annie Besant and Kathleen Ina. Aveling published a considerable amount of poetry in Progress that has been hardly acknowledged. Poems such as "Alone with my Ale-Can", "Life and Death", "From the South" and exquisitely written botanical poems that were clearly influenced by Shelley's own poem "The Sensitive Plant" (1820), such as "Melodies". Much later when the Avelings were members of the ILP Aveling was still writing poetry such as "The Tramp of the Workers" (1896).

Aveling gave his first NSS public lecture on the poet Percy Bysshe Shelley in the Hall of Science on 10 August 1879, with Annie Besant in the chair. He addressed the close relationship between the realms of the scientific and the poetical. Both Eleanor and Edward joined the Shelley Society in 1885. Aveling gave a lecture series on Shakespeare at the Hall of Science in 1881. In 1884, Aveling, now a passionate socialist, felt obliged to write a letter to The Academy in January 1884 reminding them that "The experiment of "introducing Shakspere to the East of London" is not novel. Four courses of lectures have been given—on (1) The Plays of Shakspere, (2) The Comedies of Shakspere, (3) The Falstaff Comodies, (4) Macbeth—at the Hall of Science, Old Street, St. Luke's within the last two years by Edward B. Aveling." The letter dated London, 19 January 1884 was published under the heading "Shakspere in the East of London". He started using the British Museum Reading Room in 1882 and, allegedly, he approached and introduced himself to Eleanor Marx there. Indeed, an article he wrote for Progress, entitled "Some Humours of the Reading Room at the British Museum" alluded to the flirtatious qualities of the library. Aveling even mused over a form of apartheid in the reading room "clergymen...ought be separated from their free fellows..."

Based on Beatrice Potter's diary entry for 24 May 1883 the Avelings must have already been working closely together: "In afternoon went to British Museum and met Miss Marx in refreshment room. Daughter of Karl Marx, socialist writer and refugee. Gains her livelihood by teaching 'literature' etc., and corresponding for socialist newspapers, now editing 'Progress' in the enforced absence of Mr. Foote. Very wroth about imprisonment of latter." Foote had been convicted at the beginning of March and was released on 25 February 1884. Aveling had taken over as "Interim Editor" from April 1883 to February 1884. On 24 July 1884, it was the beginning of their honeymoon in Derbyshire. Engels wrote to Eleanor's sister Laura joking about the "Unschuldslämmer"[innocent lambs]. Engels wrote to Bernstein about them: "He and Tussy have married without the involvement of registrars etc., and are now reveling in each other in the mountains of Derbyshire. Notabene about this no public noise may be made, maybe some reactionary will put something in the press, then it's time enough. The casus is that Aveling has a legitimate wife whom he cannot get rid of de jure, although he has been de facto rid of her for years. The matter has become quite well known here and has been well received even by literary philistines as a whole. My London is almost a little Paris and educates its people."

On their return from Derbyshire they lived at 55 Great Russell Street, across from the British Museum. Eleanor wrote at the time: "If love, complete agreement in inclinations and work, and the pursuit of a common goal can make people happy, then we shall be it." The "Dramatic Notes" on the theatre that they had written together are probably the most intimate sounding of their works and their common love for Henry Irving and his Shakespearian roles always shines through: "We have in another place, long ago, recorded the extraordinary impression that performance made on us. Never until that night had we understood exactly what manner of man Malvolio was. We had not seen the strange pathos of his situation, and of his nature. Even to the most earnest students of Shakespeare the playing of that part upon that night was a revelation."

In 1893, Aveling announced to German readers the appearance of an important work of English literature, namely Thomas Hardy's "Tess of the D'Urbervilles: A Pure Woman Faithfully Presented", it was stated: "A very important book appeared in England some time ago. It is so important that, despite the difficulties encountered in translating it into another language, it will most likely be translated into German before long. However, the readers of "Neue Zeit" might be interested in finding out something about the contents of the book now." He considered the work Shakespearian, especially the final scene at Stonehenge. It is presumable that this sentiment was also shared by Eleanor, as was their opinion on the Anglo-Irish writer George Moore's novels.

=== The Avelings and Ibsen ===
Ibsen's play A Doll's House in Henrietta Frances Lord's translation Nora, or, A Doll's House had its English premiere in January 1886 in Edward and Eleanor's apartment at 55, Great Russell St., opposite the British Museum. Aveling played Helmer, George Bernard Shaw played Krogstad, and Eleanor played Nora. Aveling's critical review of the play "Breaking a Butterfly" that appeared at the Prince's theatre in London, produced by Jones and Herman, and based on Ibsen's "Nora". He wrote: "Rarely has an opportunity, at once literary and dramatic, been so unhappily thrown away. A great play, dealing with a stupendous question, was to be introduced to the English people...When they Englished the play Messrs. Jones and Herman had the possibility of grappling with a tremendous problem—the meaning of marriage."

Aveling was angry that they had "misrepresented" the play, "emasculated" it, "if I may coin a meaning for a familiar word, effeminated the drama." "Ibsen, the Swedish dramatist, is 56 years old. He sees our lop-sided modern society suffering from too much man, and he has been born the woman's poet. He wants to aid in the revolutionising, with that revolution which is an evolution, the marriage relationship. He would have none of these women so dear to the common-place man of whom the poet of the common-place, Tennyson, has warbled. Where the Tennysonian woman would murmer, subject to the approval of her lord and master, "I cannot understand, I love" Ibsen's truer women are for saying decisively, "Without understanding, there can be no love." The object of marriage should be, and very clearly to-day is not, to make both man and woman more free." Aveling announced here in 1884 that further translations of Ibsen were forthcoming and by that he must have surely meant those that were being undertaking by Eleanor and Archer.

An Enemy of Society, a play by Henrik Ibsen, translated by Eleanor Marx-Aveling. London, 1888.

The Lady from the Sea, a play by Henrik Ibsen, translated by Eleanor Marx-Aveling. With critical introduction by Edmund Gosse. London: Fischer Unwin 1890.

The Wild Duck [Vildanden]. A Drama in Five Acts. By Henrik Ibsen. Translated from the Norwegian by Eleanor Marx-Aveling. Boston, 1890

In a review of Aveling's play "The Jackal", first performed in November 1889, one critic immediately alighted onto the influence of Ibsen in it: "Alec Nelson (Dr. Aveling) has written some rather poetic little pieces, but there is a bitterness and an Ibsenite exposure of the shadier specimens of humanity in his work that would give one a contempt for mankind, were we all such mean or weak creatures as he sets before us."

In April 1893 Aveling read a paper at the Playgoers' Club on Ibsen's The Master Builder.

=== Aveling and Darwin ===
In November 1862, Thomas Henry Huxley delivered some celebrated weekly lectures on Darwinian evolution that are referred to as "Six lectures to working men" (1863). Charles Darwin wrote to Huxley "they would do good and spread a taste for the Natural Sciences." In another letter to Huxley, Darwin had written "sometimes I think that general & popular Treatises are almost as important for the progress of science as original work." Aveling's string of popular works on Darwin or his Darwin lectures at the Royal Polytechnic in 1874, should be seen in this context. The success and popularity of his scientific instructional works, his membership of the College of Preceptors, his commitment to scientific teaching, almost made such an approach inevitable. At first for students, and then as a result of his secularism, that together with Eleanor Marx would later intensely embrace socialist politics, this desire to popularize and communicate Darwinian evolution to the working classes became an idée fixe. Suzanne Paylor has written: "Aveling's 'Popular Darwinism' was significantly different from much of what was peddled elsewhere in late 19th-century popular culture...He was a scientist by qualification, but was also an excellent popularizer in print and practice. In an era when the public interest in science had never been higher, most of the standard texts about science, as well as conventional scientific education, were beyond the pockets of the common man and woman. Aveling offered a valuable yet affordable alternative."

Aveling's contact with Darwin appears to have begun around 1878. In September 1878, Aveling described Darwin as "first among the scientific men of England" in Aveling's first popular article in the series 'Darwin and His Work', that appeared in Student's Magazine and Science and Art (1878–1879). The series ran for a year, and although it is not known how many of the seven numbers Darwin received, he sent Aveling encouragement at the start and also asked to see future instalments. In a letter he sent Darwin written from the Royal Polytechnic on 12 October 1880, Aveling explained to Darwin that the original journal had ended and that he had now rewritten these articles and published them: "The Magazine wherein they appeared came to an untimely end and I have since its decease rewritten the articles & published them together with many others, their successors in the National Reformer. The works hitherto dealt with are the Voyage, Volcanic Islands, Geology of S. America, Orchids, Climbing Plants, Insectivorous Plants. I purpose after a study of the Forms of Flowers & Cross & self-fertn. dealing with the Cirripedia & finally with the series commencing with the Origin & ending at present with the Emotions."

The series entitled 'Darwin and His Views', appeared in six instalments in the National Reformer between 19 January 1879 and 2 March 1879. The series began with Aveling using false initials "E.D." and following his secularist credo in July 1879, when he publicly announced that he was a Freethinker, later that year appeared in twenty-nine instalments using his own name, entitled 'Darwin and His Works'. The same letter from Aveling cited above (12.10.1880) also requested Darwin's permission so that he could dedicate a work of his: "My friends Mrs. Annie Besant and Charles Bradlaugh, M.P. contemplate publishing under the title of the International Library of Science & Freethought a series of works either by great scientific and freethinking men or upon their labors. The first of the series will be a translation of Dr L. Büchner's "An dem Geistes leben der Thiere" by Mrs. Besant. To this translatn. Dr. Büchner has given full assent. A translatn. of some work from the pen of Ernst Häckel by myself is also designed and other arrangements in regard to French & Italian works are pending. We desire to make the second volume of the series my work upon your writings and teachings. To you, Sir, therefore I again write to know if such a plan will meet with your approval and have the distinct advantage of your personal sanction. We desire from you as from Dr. Büchner and Professor Häckel the illustrious support of your consent. As it is long since I last wrote, I remind you that the volume we desire to produce is designed (1) to give students of your writings a condensed analysis thereof (2) to give those who have not time to read your productions a brief account of your discoveries and ideas."

Darwin politely declined Aveling's request and gave the following reasons for doing so: "...Moreover though I am a strong advocate for free thought on all subjects, yet it appears to me (whether rightly or wrongly) that direct arguments against christianity & theism produce hardly any effect on the public; & freedom of thought is best promoted by the gradual illumination of men's minds, which follows from the advance of science. It has, therefore, been always my object to avoid writing on religion, & I have confined myself to science. I may, however, have been unduly biased by the pain which it would give some members of my family, if I aided in any way direct attacks on religion.— I am sorry to refuse you any request, but I am old & have very little strength, & looking over proof-sheets (as I know by present experience) fatigues me much. I remain Dear Sir | Yours faithfully | Ch. Darwin."

On 9 August 1881 Aveling had sent Darwin a copy of his book The Student's Darwin with an inscription . On 8 September, George Romanes had published a fairly positive review in Nature of the book: "On the whole, the "Student's Darwin" deserves to be successful in its object of popularising Mr. Darwin's work. The great bar to its usefulness will be its needlessly aggressive tone towards religion, which is sure greatly to lessen a circulation which it might otherwise have had." Later that same month, Aveling and Ludwig Büchner, a former student of Rudolf Virchow's, visited Charles Darwin at his home Down House. They both had attended the congress of the International Federation of Freethinkers held in London from 25–27 September and Büchner, its President, wanted to meet Darwin. Aveling had telegraphed Darwin beforehand, and they both journeyed to Down, arriving there on 28 September. Aveling published a´full account of their visit in the National Reformer in 1882. They discussed atheism and Darwin preferred to be considered an agnostic rather than an atheist, in Aveling's later account of this meeting he wrote: "We explained to him that we were Atheists, but did not say there was no God. Only being unable to realise and believe in the idea of Deity, we were without God; neither asserting, however, nor denying His existence. We found that Darwin held the same opinion, only, as he put it, he called himself an Agnostic. Personally, I have always held that "Atheist" is only "Agnostic" writ aggressive, and "Agnostic" is only "Atheist" writ respectable. We found, upon further enquiry, that he was some forty years of age before he became an Agnostic. Asked why he gave up the Christian religion, he made the reply, "Because I found no evidence for it." And this, coming from perhaps the greatest and most careful weigher of evidence ever known, has its significance."

A further remark of Darwin's recorded by Aveling acquired canonical status: "Then the talk fell upon Christianity, and these remarkable words were uttered: "I never gave up Christianity until I was forty years of age." Aveling was clearly overcome when Darwin made this remark and had written: "I commend these words to the careful consideration of all and sundry who claimed the great naturalist as an orthodox Christian. The unscrupulous will probably quote this remark hereafter with a designed omission of the last seven words. But by a similar device, the Bible can be made to say that "there is no god." I confess that a great joy took possession of me as I heard a statement by its implication so encouraging. I, like the rest of the outside world, was not sure as to his position in regard to religion. Now, from his own lips, I knew that before I was born this, my master, had cast aside the crippling faith. The step taken by so many of us had been taken by him long ago. What a strength and hope are in the thought that the first thinker of our age had abandoned Christianity!" His popular and informative writings on Darwinism, especially his "The Student's Darwin" (1881), appeared as Vol 2 in the series 'International Library of Science and Freethought', despite Darwin's refusal for it to be dedicated to him.

Aveling's works such as "Darwinism and Small Families" (1882), "The Religious views of Charles Darwin" (1883), "The Darwinian Theory. Its meaning, difficulties, evidence, history" (1884), "The People's Darwin" (1885) and "Darwin Made Easy" (1887) were widely read by the general public. In 1895 Aveling's "Darwin Made Easy" was still being advertised in The Freethinker as "...the best popular exposition of Darwinism extant." In the publication of his lectures on Biology "Biological Discoveries and Problems" (1881) that were all delivered in 1880 at the Unitarian South Place Chapel, Finsbury, he expressed his desire to play the part of "intellectual middle-man" by that he meant to "present the discoveries, the definitions, and the theories of the great thinkers upon living things in condensed and...in simple form before those who may not have the time to study the masters at first hand." Speaking of Darwin, he would write in his introduction: "Then it is the duty of him that has been more fortunate to re-echo the utterance of his master, to repeat his thoughts many, many times, that the joy that has fallen upon the life of this fortunate one may pass into the lives of many, that the intellectual light that has fallen upon his eyes may dawn upon the vision of his fellows." Now the students of Darwin would also become "intellectual middle-men." Aveling proclaimed: "It is their duty, as it is their privilege, to receive great truths from those on the heights above them, and to transmit them to the multitudes toiling below. Thus is the great mass of mankind raised slowly, but surely, up the steep hill of knowledge towards a serener air."

=== Aveling and Haeckel ===
Aveling also translated the German zoologist Ernst Haeckel, who himself was probably the greatest popularizer of Darwin, earning him the sobriquet from Aveling as 'The German Darwin'. As with Darwin, Aveling had also written to Haeckel in October 1880, with the proposal to include some of his works in translation in the International Library of Science and Freethought series. Aveling's familiarity with Haeckel's writings appears to be from a much earlier date as he already recognizes him here as a "master" and said that he had "sat at his feet". This is a testament to the influence of Thomas Huxley and Ray Lankester at University College London; Huxley a personal friend of Haeckel's and Lankester who had actually studied under Haeckel at Jena in 1871, and later together with Dora Schmitz, the daughter of Leonhard Schmitz, had published an English translation of his "Natürliche Schöpfungs-Geschichte" (1868). In 1882 Aveling corresponded with Haeckel who had recently read out in a lecture at Eisenach, in Thuringia, Germany, an "irreligious letter" of Darwin's written in 1879 to a former Russian student of Haeckel's who had studied at the University of Jena. A scandal ensued after Haeckel's lecture was published in the scientific journal Nature on 23 September 1882, only after it had been "censored" leaving out Darwin's letter and the sensational lines:

 "Science has nothing to do with Christ; except in so far, as the habit of scientific research makes a man cautious in admitting evidence. For myself I do not believe, that there ever has been any Revelation. As for a future life, every man must judge for himself between conflicting vague probabilities."  [226]

Additionally, Haeckel's own comments to this letter of Darwin's from his lecture were censored. This resulted in an outpouring of disbelief and scorn by politically radical and secularist figures centred around the National Reformer (edited by Charles Bradlaugh and Annie Besant). The complete translation of the letter was published by Aveling in the National Reformer (1 October 1882) and in an article that appeared the following week from Annie Besant, with the title: "Darwin and Haeckel", she addressed this suppression and censorship which she thought, exhibited clear signs of the influence of the powerful Christian Evidence Society and the Anti-Atheistic Committee.

When Aveling wrote to inform Haeckel about this censorship that had taken place in Nature, at first Haeckel did not believe him. When Haeckel eventually published this lecture, he also added a 'Nachschrift' and published in it Aveling's recent letter to him, and it was clear he shared Aveling's outrage at this example of censorship in England towards Darwin's views on religion as well as his own comments. The following year Aveling's Haeckel translation appeared as vol. six in the series The International Library of Science and Freethought, which included the ten lectures from Haeckel's "Gesammelte populäre Vorträge aus dem Gebiete der Entwickelungslehre"[Collected popular lectures from the field of evolutionary theory] under the title "The Pedigree of Man. And Other Essays."(1883). Of particular importance is Aveling's English translation of Haeckel's lecture from 1863, "The Darwinian Theory", that was given at the 38th scientific congress for German Naturalists and Physicians in Stettin (now Szczecin in Poland), and of what is considered to be one of the first public discussions of Darwinism in Germany.

=== Aveling's publication of Darwin's letter to Marx ===
In 1897, Aveling published for the first time a letter of Charles Darwin's to Karl Marx that had been written in 1873. It was the first published disclosure of any correspondence between Marx and Darwin."I should like to quote a letter from Darwin to Marx, which appears to me very characteristic and very beautiful. In 1873, Marx sent Darwin the second edition of the first volume of Das Kapital. He received in answer the following letter: ...." The American sociologist, Lewis Samuel Feuer, writing as a lapsed Marxist, was of the opinion that Aveling had in all probability forged this letter so as to make some money from selling it: "Edward Aveling...was the first English exponent of what today would be called the 'socialism of the rip-off'. Since his kit of tools included forgery, theft, and deceit, his statements pose methodological problems." The allegations Feuer had read in Hyndman, Bernstein et al., and he had taken at face value, amounted to severely prejudiced opinions and hearsay, that detrimentally influenced any claim to objective scholarship. Kapp's first volume of her weighted biography of Eleanor Marx had only appeared in 1972. The letter, held at the International Institute of Social History, Amsterdam, has been proven as genuine, and is included in the Darwin correspondence edition.

"To Karl Marx 1 October 1873

Down, | Beckenham, Kent.

Dear Sir

I thank you for the honour which you have done me by sending me your great work on Capital; & I heartily wish that I was more worthy to receive it, by understanding more of the deep & important subject of political economy. Though our studies have been so different, I believe that we both earnestly desire the extension of knowledge, & that this in the long run is sure to add to the happiness of mankind.

I remain Dear Sir Yours faithfully Charles Darwin"

As Ralph Colp Jr. has written: "About the time he received Darwin's letter, Marx, with his wife and daughter Eleanor, attended a lecture on "Insects and Flowers," by Edward Aveling - a young science teacher - which illustrated some aspects of Natural Selection. Afterwards, Marx spoke to Aveling and congratulated him on his talk."

=== Later life, death and legacy ===
In 1897, Aveling left Eleanor and on 8 June that year secretly married a young actress, Eva Frye, who had appeared in one of his plays, using his pen-name Alec Nelson. He returned to Eleanor in September when he was suffering from kidney disease. Aveling had suffered from what the family physician Bryan Donkin had originally diagnosed in 1885 as a kidney stone. Engels had written to Laura Lafargue telling her that Aveling and 'Tussy' were at Ventnor on the Isle of Wight recuperating because of Aveling's illness then. Engels had written to Laura again in 1891 telling her that because of his kidney problem he was at St Margaret's Bay on the Kent coast. Aveling had also been seriously ill in April–May 1893 and went to Hastings. Eleanor Marx had written to Liebknecht, who was in prison at the time, that this was now a four year old abscess. He was operated on (9 February), in what appears to have only been an exploratory operation by the surgeon Christopher Heath at University College Hospital.

After nursing him for some time, which included a period of convalescence at the sea-resort of Margate in Kent, Eleanor Marx resorted to suicide on 31 March 1898. Her biographer, Yvonne Kapp provides full details of the suicide, and that the post mortem examination concluded that the cause of death was poisoning by prussic acid, purchased at the local chemist by the maid. A coroner's inquest delivered a verdict of "suicide while in a state of 'temporary insanity'". Eleanor had previously attempted to take her life in 1887. Aveling, however, was widely reviled amongst socialist circles (particularly by Hyndman, Banner, Keir Hardie and Bernstein) as having caused Eleanor to take her own life on this occasion. It was even wildly suggested that Aveling ran away from an intended suicide pact with her and was a knowing accessory to an act of suicide (Robert Banner, Bernstein, and Hyndman), or that he might have murdered her. Yvonne Kapp has detailed the recriminations against Aveling as well as the "flagrant inaccuracies" and "fictionalised versions" about her death that ensued.

Eleanor left a short note for Aveling: "Dear, it will soon be all over now. My last word to you is the same I've said during these long, sad years—love." Aveling died some four months later on Tuesday 2 August 1898, at 2, Stafford Mansions, Albert Bridge Road, S.W. London Battersea of kidney disease, an outcome that Eleanor had already feared. He was 48. His body was cremated at Woking Crematorium, Surrey, three days later. A report in The Observer said that there were about half-a-dozen immediate relatives present at the funeral. It remarked on the fact that there was not much fanfare "Strange to say, however, although Dr. Aveling was considered to be one of the most prominent leaders of the Socialist movement in England, he having been closely identified with it since its inauguration, no representatives of this society were present at the last obsequies. The Doctor was also a leading figure in the movement on the Continent. The coffin, which was of deal, covered with light blue cloth, bore no inscription. On it were placed six floral emblems, trimmed with mauve ribbon." One of the first obituaries written had him simply as "Dr. Edward Aveling, Social Democrat, botanist, and playwright." a further short obituary in the Popular Science Monthly for November 1898 has the following: "Dr. E. B. Aveling, late assistant in physiology at Cambridge and professor of chemistry and physiology at New College, a writer upon scientific topics, in London, 4 August, aged forty-seven years".

=== Legacy ===
Aveling was disliked by many of his contemporaries for his alleged tendency to borrow money from everyone. Eleanor was also criticised, George Standring's pet name for her was "Lady Macbeth Aveling". In his monumental work on William Morris, E. P. Thompson, warned about the dangers of any retrospective interpretation of Aveling's biography, G. B. Shaw had also commented on Aveling's "homeric" style of borrowing: "However, the tragedy of 1898 (when the relationship ended in Eleanor's suicide) should not be read back into the events of the 1880s. Until 1887 Morris valued the Avelings as among the best comrades in the leadership of the League. Month by month Eleanor contributed her record of the International movement to Commonweal, her own contacts and those of Engels being drawn upon to the full. Aveling shared the editorship of the paper with Morris for the first year, and Morris admired his command of Scientific Socialism, both as a lecturer and writer." This warning about 'reading back' is equally the case for the 1870s. If he had repeated many of Kapp's interpretations of Aveling from the first volume which introduced his character (much of which Kapp had taken from A. H. Nethercot's work on Annie Besant), his later review of her second volume of Eleanor's biography, illustrated a much greater criticism and scepticism towards her biographical style.

Leon Trotsky writing from Oslo in October 1935 on "Engels' Letters to Kautsky", often mentions Aveling. In the context of Kautsky's criticism of Engels as a "poor judge of men" and that he supported him in politics. "Engels had particular affection for Eleanor, Marx' youngest daughter. Aveling became her friend; he was a married man who had broken with his first family. This circumstance engendered around the "illegal" couple the stifling atmosphere of genuinely British hypocrisy. Is it greatly to be marvelled at that Engels came to the strong defense of Eleanor and her friend, even irrespective of his moral qualities? Eleanor fought for her love for Aveling so long as she had any strength left. Engels was not blind but he considered that the question of Aveling's personality concerned Eleanor, first and foremost. On his part he assumed only the duty to defend her against hypocrisy and evil gossip. 'Hands off!' he stubbornly told the pious hypocrites. In the end, unable to bear up under the blows of personal life, Eleanor committed suicide." Trotsky made comparisons of the Avelings' marital personal life with Kautsky's own divorce and the fact that Engels had taken the side of Louise Strasser.

== Publications by Edward Aveling ==
=== Selected writings ===
- The Bookworm, and other Sketches; by Edward B. Aveling, D.Sc., Fellow of University College, London. (London: Hamilton, Adams, & Co., 32, Peternoster Row, E.C. 1878. [In his introduction (signed Christmas, 1878) Aveling reveals that some of these sketches had already appeared in the pages of "Things in General. A quarterly magazine, edited by Teufelsdröckkh, the Younger [pseud.]. vol. 1–2. London, 1877–79."][British Library: P. P. 5273e], and a magazine called: "Figaro".]
- Why I Dare Not Be a Christian. London: Freethought Publishing Company, n.d. [1881].
- The Wickedness of God. London: Freethought Publishing Company, n.d. [1881].
- The Creed of an Atheist. London: Freethought Publishing Company, n.d. [1881].
- The Plays of Shakspere... : The Substance of Four Lectures Delivered at the Hall of Science, London. London: Freethought Publishing Company, n.d. [1881].
- The Value of this Earthly Life. A Reply to W. H. Mallock's "Is Life worth Living?" Freethought Publishing Company, London, [1881]
- Plays of Shakespeare, 4d. Macbeth.
- An Atheist on Tennyson's Despair., in: Modern Thought, January 1882; pp.7-10.
- A Godless Life: The Happiest and Most Useful. London, A. Besant and C. Bradlaugh, 1882.
- The Sermon on the Mount Freethought Publishing Company, London, [1881].
- On Superstition. Freethought Publishing Company, London, [1881].
- Shakspere the Dramatist, in: Our corner; London Vol. 1, Iss.3, (Mar 1883), pp. 147–152; Vol. 1, Iss. 4, (Apr 1883): 218–222, Vol. 1, Iss. 5, (May 1883): 272–276; London Vol. 1, Iss. 6, (Jun 1883): 345–349; Vol. 2, Iss. 1, (Jul 1883): 33–36; Our corner; London Vol. 2, Iss. 2, (Aug 1883): 89–93;
- Art Corner, in: Our Corner; London Vol. 1, Iss. 5, (May 1883), pp. 299–302.
- Friends of God and Friends of Man, in: The National Reformer, 27 May 1883, p.389.
- The Dream of the Boy Jesus, in: Our Corner, 1 July 1883.pp. 30–32.
- Art Corner, in: Our Corner; London Vol. 2, Iss. 4, (Oct 1883), pp. 235–238.
- Some Humors of the Reading Room at the British Museum, in: Progress Vol. I. (May 1883), pp. 312–313.
- "Nora," and "Breaking a Butterfly." E. Aveling in: To-Day: monthly magazine of scientific socialism; vol. 1, 1884, pp. 473–480.
- Alone With My Ale-Can, in: Progress: A Monthly magazine of Advanced Thought (1884), Vol. III.-No.2, 1884, p. 90. [poem]
- Henry Irving And His Critics. By Edward B. Aveling., in: Progress: A Monthly magazine of Advanced Thought (1884), Vol. III.-No.1, pp. 24–29; Vol. III.-No.2, pp. [92]–97.
- The Rottenness of our Press., in: Progress: A Monthly magazine of Advanced Thought. (1884), Vol. III.-No.3, pp. 158–163.
- The Rottenness of our Press. II., in: Progress: A Monthly magazine of Advanced Thought (1884), Vol. III.-No.4, pp. 217–222.
- "Twelfth Night" at the Lyceum., in: Art Corner. Our Corner; London (Aug 1884), pp. 115–118.
- "Claudian" at the Princess's., in: Progress: A Monthly magazine of Advanced Thought. (1884), Vol. III.-No.5, 268–272.
- Christianity and Capitalism.in: To-Day: monthly magazine of scientific socialism. London. Vol. 1, Iss. 1, (Jan 1884), pp. 30–38; Iss. 2, (Feb 1884), pp. 125–134; Iss. 3, (Mar 1884), pp. 177–187.
- The Curse of Capital by Edward B. Aveling, D.Sc. London: Freethought Publishing Company, 63, Fleet Street E.C. 1884.[Price One Penny]
- Hamlet at the Princess's., in: To-Day : monthly magazine of scientific socialism; London Vol. 2, Iss. 11, (Nov 1884), pp. 516–537.
- A "Mummer's Wife". By Edward Aveling, in: Progress: A Monthly magazine of Advanced Thought. (1885), Vol. V., pp. 503- [A review of the work of the Anglo-Irish playwright George Moore (1852–1933)]
- "Hoodman Blind" at the Princess's., in: Progress: A Monthly magazine of Advanced Thought. (1885), Vol. V., pp. 437–443.
- Browning as a Dramatist., in: Progress: A Monthly magazine of Advanced Thought. (1885), Vol. V., pp. 551–557.
- The Meaning of Socialism., in: To-Day: monthly magazine of scientific socialism; London Vol. 3, Iss. 13, (Jan 1885), pp. 1–10.
- Das Drama in England., in: Die Neue Zeit. Revue des geistigen und öffentlichen Lebens. 3(1885), Heft 4, S. 170–176.
- Politische Korrespondenz. England. In: Die Neue Zeit. Revue des geistigen und öffentlichen Lebens. 3(1885), Heft 4, S. 189–192.
- Edward Aveling "British Socialism and the "Weekly Dispatch", in: The Commonweal, February,1885, Vol. 1, No. 1.
- "Lessons in Socialism." "I. Scientific Socialism – Value", in: The Commonweal, April 1885, pp. 21–22; "II", (May 1885), p. 33; "III", (June, 1885), pp. 45–46.; "IV", (July, 1885), pp. 57–58.; "V", (September, 1885), pp. 81–81.; "VI", (October, 1885), pp. 89–90; "VII", (Dec., 1885), pp. 104–105; "VIII", (Jan., 1886), p. 5.; "IX", Vol. 2, No.14, March, 1886, pp. 18–19; "X", "XI", Vol. 2, No.15, April 1886, p. 29.
- Edward Aveling "Signs of the Times", in: The Commonweal, Vol. 2, No. 13, February, 1886, p. 14.
- "Notes." [Signed "Ed.A."], in: The Commonmweal, Vol. 2, No.16, 1 May 1886, p. 35.
- Objections to Socialism (A reply to Mr. Charles Bradlaugh, M.P.) III , in: The Commonmweal, Vol. 2, No.18, 15 May 1886, p. 51; "IV". Vol. 2, No. 20, 29 May 1886, pp. 69–70; "V". Vol. 2, No.23, 19 June 1886, p. 93; "VI" in: Vol. 2, No.26, 10 July 1886, pp. 117–118; "VII". Vol. 2, No.29, 31 July 1886, pp. 141–142.(To be continued)
- The People's Press, in: The Commonmweal, Vol. 2, No.18, 15 May 1886, pp. 54–55.
- Notes on News , in: The Commonmweal, Vol. 2, No.20, 29 May 1886, p. 51.
- Tennyson's "Becket." Its Humors and Intimations., in: Progress: A Monthly Magazine of Advanced Thought, Vol. 6, 1886, pp. 313–319.
- The Russian Church. (From the French of Leo Tikhomirov.), in: Progress: A Monthly Magazine of Advanced Thought, Vol. 6, 1886, pp. 386–389.
- A Revolution in Printing, in: Time, April, 1890, Vol. 1, pp. 412-418.
- The Eight Hours' Working-Day, in: Time, June 1890, Vol. 1, pp. 632-638.
- The new era in German socialism. In: The Daily Chronicle, 25. September 1890.
- Coercion Abolished.In: Newcastle Daily Chronicle - Tuesday 30 September 1890, p. 4.
- At The Old Bailey, in: Time. October 1890, S. 1098–1107. (Digitalisat Marxist org)

,* Type-Writers And Writers, in: Time. December 1890, S. 1322–1329. (Digitalisat Marxist org)

- Der Kongreß der britischen Trades-Unions, in: Die Neue Zeit, Jg. 1891/92, Bd. 2.
- Discord in ‚The International'. Continental opinion on the British Trade Unionists. in: The Pall Mall Gazette. 11. Oktober 1892.
- The proposed Eight Hours Congress. Boykott by foreign workers. in: The Workmans' Times. vom 15. Oktober 1892.
- Russia Political And Social. Vol. 1, 1892
- The Students' Marx: An Introduction to the Study of Karl Marx' Capital. London: Swan Sonnenschein & Co., 1892.
- Der Kongreß der britischen Trades-Unions. in: Die Neue Zeit. Revue des geistigen und öffentlichen Lebens. 11.1892–93, 1. Bd.(1893), Heft 1, S. 20–28.
- The Fourth Clause. in: The Clarion, March 1893.
- Interview and Speech at Halifax in: The Halifax Courier, November 1893.
- Ein englischer Roman. In: Die Neue Zeit. Revue des geistigen und öffentlichen Lebens. 11.1892–93, 2. Bd.(1893), Heft 51, S. 747–758. [The novel was Thomas Hardy's "Tess of the d'Urbervilles"]
- Einiges vom Neuen Unionismus in England. in: Die Neue Zeit. Revue des geistigen und öffentlichen Lebens. 12.1893–94, 2. Bd.(1894), Heft 37, S. 344–347.
- Esther Walters. Ein englischer Roman von George Moore. In: Die Neue Zeit. Revue des geistigen und öffentlichen Lebens.13.1894–95, 1. Bd.(1895), Heft 13, S. 405–411.
- Death of F. Engels. A Great Socialist. In: Reynolds's Newspaper, London 11. August 1895.
- Engels at home. In: The Labour Prophet and Labour Church Record. Vol. VI., London 1895, Nr. 45 September und 46 Oktober, S. 140–142 und 149.
- Wilhelm Liebknecht and the Social-Democratic Movement in Germany. London: Twentieth Century Press, n.d. [1896].
- Breve histoire des manifestations de May Day pour la journee legale de huit heures en Angleterre, in: Le Devinir Sociale, May 1896.
- Zur Geschichte der Maidemonstration für den gesetzlichen Achtstundentag in England. In: Die neue Zeit. Revue des geistigen und öffentlichen Lebens. 14.1895–96, 2. Bd.(1896), Heft 31, S. 137–143.
- Ein eigenartiges Inselvolk. in: Die neue Zeit. Revue des geistigen und öffentlichen Lebens. 13.1894–95, 2. Bd.(1895), Heft 46, S. 631–636.
- Charles Darwin and Karl Marx: A Comparison, in: The New century review; London Vol. 1, Iss. 4, (Apr 1897): pp. 321–327.
- Charles Darwin and Karl Marx: A Comparison. London: Twentieth Century Press, n.d. [c. 1897].
- Charles Darwin und Karl Marx. Eine Parallele. in: Die Neue Zeit. Revue des geistigen und öffentlichen Lebens. 15.1896–97, 2. Bd.(1897), Heft 50, S. 745–757.
- George Julian Harney: A Straggler of 1848. in: The Social Democrat, No. 1, January 1897, pp. 3–8.
- Socialism in France from 1876-1896, in: Fortnightly Review, vol. 68, September 1897, pp. 445–458.[This article from Paul Lafargue was translated and signed by Edward Aveling.]
- Filibuster Cecil Rhodes and his Chartered Company in: The Social-Democrat, Vol. 1, No.9, September 1897
- Der Flibustier Cecil Rhodes und seine Chartered Company im Roman. in: Die neue Zeit. Revue des geistigen und öffentlichen Lebens, 16.1897–98, 1. Band (1898), Heft 6, S. 182–188.

=== Scientific writings ===
- Botanical Tables, for the use of students. Compiled by Edward B. Aveling, B.Sc. (London: Hamilton, Adams &Co., 32, Paternoster Row, E.C.; Warren Hall & James J. Lovitt, 88, Camden Road, N.W. [1874])
- Physiological Tables, for the use of students. Compiled by Edward B. Aveling, D.Sc., F.L.S. London : Hamilton, Adams & Co., 1877.
- On the Teaching of Physiology.(Paper read at the Monthly Evening Meeting of the College of Preceptors.), in: The Educational Times, 1 March 1878, pp. 73–75.
- On the Teaching of Botany in Schools. in: The Educational Times, 1 April 1879, pp. 107–110.
- Comparative Physiology for London University matriculation and science and art examinations. By Edward Aveling, D.Sc., F.L.S: Part I. (London: W. Stewart & Co., Holborn Viaduct Steps, E.C. Edinburgh: J. Menzies & Co. [1879] [Stewart's Educational Series]
- Natural Philosophy for London University Matriculation. London: Stewart and Co., 1881
- The Student's Darwin. London: Freethought Publishing Co., 1881.
- "Worms " By Charles Darwin , in: The National Reformer, 30 October 1881, 364.
- The Irreligion of Science. London: Freethought Publishing Co., n.d. [1881].
- Biological Discoveries and Problems. London: Freethought Publishing Co., n.d. [c. 1881].
- God Dies, Nature Remains. London: Freethought Publishing Co., n.d. [c. 1881].
- The Borderland Between Living and Non-Living Things: A Lecture Delivered Before the Sunday Lecture Society, on Sunday Afternoon, 5 November 1882... London: Sunday Lecture Society, 1882.
- General Biology: Theoretical and Practical. London: n.p., 1882.
- Science and Secularism. London: Freethought Publishing Co., 1882.
- Botanical Tables: For the Use of Students. London: Freethought Publishing Co., n.d. [1882].
- Science and Religion. London, A. Besant and C. Bradlaugh, n.d. [1882].
- Superstition, 1d.
- Mind as a function of the nervous system, in: National Reformer, xxxix (1882), pp. 469–470; xl (1882), pp. 3–4, 21–2.
- Ernst Haeckel, The Pedigree of Man: And Other Essays. London: Freethought Publishing Company, 63, Fleet Street, E.C. 1883.
- The Religious Views of Charles Darwin. London: Freethought Publishing Company, 1883.
- The Darwinian Theory. London: Progressive Publishing Company, n.d. [c. 1883].
- The Commune of Plants and Animals, in: National Reformer, xlii (1883), pp. 371–372.
- The Darwinian Theory: Its Meaning, Difficulties, Evidence, History. London: Progressive Publishing Co., 1884.
- The Gospel of Evolution. Freethought Publishing Company, 63, Fleet Street, London, 1884.[Annie Besant had previously published a The Gospel of Atheism (1877)]
- Mental Evolution in Animals, in: National Reformer, xliii (1884), pp. 210–211.
- The Origin of Man. London: Progressive Publishing Co., 1884.
- Chemistry of the Non-Metallics. in: The Practical Teacher; London Vol. 4, Iss. 1, (Mar 1884), pp. 11–13; (May 1884), pp. 119–120; (June, 1884), pp. 157–158; (July, 1884), pp. 217–218; (Aug., 1884), pp. 259–260; (Sep., 1884), pp. 334–335;(Oct., 1884), pp. 378–379; Vol. 4, Iss. 11, (Jan., 1885), pp. 494–497; (July, 1885), pp. 200–201; Vol. 5, Iss.9, (Nov., 1885), pp. 394–396; Vol.6, Iss.1, (March, 1886), pp. 8–9; (April, 1886), pp. 64–66; (May, 1886), pp. 105–107.
- Brute Habits in Man, in: Progress, Vol. III.−No.6. (June, 1884), pp. 325–331.
- Monkeys, Apes and Men. London: Progressive Publishing Co., 1885.
- Astronomical Problems.-II. By Edward Aveling, in: Progress: A Monthly magazine of Advanced Thought. Edited by G. W. Foote., Vol. V (1885), pp. 26–31.
- Explosions in Coal Mines. By Edward Aveling, in: Progress (1885), Vol. V., pp. 361–367.
- Explosionen in Kohlenbergwerken. in: Die Neue Zeit. Revue des geistigen und öffentlichen Lebens, 3, 1885, Heft 10, S. 473–479.
- Man's Manufacture of Organic Bodies. By Edward Aveling, in: Progress (1885), Vol. V., pp. 65–69; II. 130–133; 179–182.
- The Cholera Germ. By Edward Aveling, in: Progress (1885), Vol. V., pp. 266–272.
- Dr. Koch und der Cholerabarillus. in: Die Neue Zeit. Revue des geistigen und öffentlichen Lebens, 3, 1885, Heft 7, S. 297–304.
- Chemistry of the Non-Metallics. London : J. Hughes, 1886.[Hughes Matriculation Manuals]
- Natural Philosophy for London University Matriculation. By Edward B. Aveling, D.Sc. (Fellow of University College, London.) Dealing with all the required Subjects, and containing over One Hundred and Fifty Examples worked out in full, and some Hundreds of Exercises for Solution by the Student. Revised Edition. London: W. Stewart & Co., Holborn Viaduct Steps, E.C. Edinburgh: J. Menzies & Co. [1886.]
- Die Fortschritte der Naturwissenschaften im Jahre 1885. in: Die Neue Zeit. Revue des geistigen und öffentlichen Lebens, 4, 1886, Heft 5, S. 226–236.
- Theorien der Vererbung. in: Die neue Zeit. Revue des geistigen und öffentlichen Lebens, 4, 1886, Heft 9, S. 399–405.
- Darwin Made Easy. London: Progressive Publishing Co., 1887 (three separately paginated lectures titled 'The Darwinian Theory', 'The Origin of Man', and 'Monkeys, Apes, and Men').
- Mechanics and Experimental Science as Required for the Matriculation Examination of the University of London..[1887.]
- Key to Mechanics. London: Chapman and Hall, 1888.
- Key to Chemistry. London: Chapman and Hall, 1888.
- Mechanics, and Light and Heat: For London University Matriculation. London : W. Stewart & Co., n.d. [1888].
- Mechanics and Experimental Science as Required for the Matriculation Examination of the University of London: Magnetism and Electricity. London: Chapman and Hall, 1889.
- The people's Darwin, or, Darwin made easy. London: R Forder, 188?
- An Introduction to the Study of Botany. London: Swan Sonnenschein & Co., 1891
- The students' Marx. An introduction to the study of Karl Marx' Capital. London: S. Sonnenschein, 1892
- An Introduction to the Study of Geology, Specially Adapted for the Use of Candidates for the London B.Sc. and the Science and Art Department Examinations. London: Swan Sonnenschein & Co., 1893.
- Naturwissenschaftliches aus England und Deutschland. In: Die Neue Zeit. Revue des geistigen und öffentlichen Lebens. 12.1893–94, 1. Bd.(1894), Heft 15, S. 461–467.
- Die Schlacht der Mikroben. In: Die Neue Zeit. Revue des geistigen und öffentlichen Lebens. 13.1894–95, 1. Bd.(1895), Heft 15, S. 476–480; (Fortsetzung)Heft 16, S. 509–512; (Schluß) Heft 17, S. 541–544.
- Thomas Henry Huxley, Der Freund und Erklärer Darwins., in: Die Neue Zeit. 14.Jg. 1896, 3, 85–90.

=== Writings coauthored with Eleanor ===
- The Factory Hell. with Eleanor Marx Aveling. London: Socialist League Office, 1885.
- The Woman Question. Westminster Review, vol.125, Iss. 249, (January)1886, pp. 207–222.
- The Woman Question. With Eleanor Marx Aveling. London: Swan Sonnenschein & Co., 1886.
- An die Mitglieder der Sektion St. Paul, S.L.P. In: Chicagoer Arbeiter-Zeitung, Nr. 240, 17 Februar, 1887.
- An die Redaktion der N. Y. Volkszeitung. In: New Yorker Volkszeitung, 2. März 1887.
- An die Redaktion der N. Y. Volkszeitung. In: New Yorker Volkszeitung, 30. März 1887.
- The Working Class Movement in America. With Eleanor Marx Aveling. London: Swan Sonnenschein & Co., 1887. Second Edition, 1891.
- Die Lage der Arbeiterklasse in Amerika. in: Die Neue Zeit. Revue des geistigen und öffentlichen Lebens. 5(1887), Heft 6, S. 241–246; Heft 7, S. 307–313.
- The Chicago Anarchists., in: To-day: monthly magazine of scientific socialism; London Iss. 48, (Nov 1887), pp. 142–149.
- The Chicago Anarchists. A Statement of Facts. Reprinted from 'To-Day', November 1887. London: W. Reeves, 1888.
- Shelley and Socialism., in: To-day: monthly magazine of scientific socialism; London Iss. 53, (Apr 1888), pp. 103–116.
- Shelley's Socialism: Two Lectures. With Eleanor Marx Aveling. London: privately published, 1888.
- Shelley als Sozialist. in: Die Neue Zeit. Revue des geistigen und öffentlichen Lebens. 6(1888), Heft 12, S. 540–550.
- Shelley und der Sozialismus. II. Theil. in: Die Neue Zeit. Revue des geistigen und öffentlichen Lebens. 10.1891–92, 2. Bd.(1892), Heft 45, S. 581–588.
- Die Kuhjungen. in: Die Neue Zeit. Revue des geistigen und öffentlichen Lebens. 7(1889), Heft 1, S. 35–39.
- Die Wahlen in Großbritannien. in: Die Neue Zeit. Revue des geistigen und öffentlichen Lebens 2(1891–2), Heft 45, S.596–603.
- Socialist Personalities: Sketches at the Zurich International Congress. Westminster Gazette, Monday 14 August 1893, pp. 1–2.
- Socialist Personalities. Sketches at the Zurich International Congress. The Westminster Budget, 18 August 1893, p. 10.
- More Socialist Personalities: The Women Delegates at the International Congress. Westminster Gazette, Saturday 19 August 1893, p. 3.
- The Eastern Question by Karl Marx- A Reprint of Letters written 1853–56 dealing with the events of the Crimean War. Edited by Eleanor Marx-Aveling, with a preface by Edward Aveling. London: Swan Sonnenschein & Co. 1898.
- Value, Price, and Profit, addressed to Working Men by Karl Marx. Edited by Eleanor Marx-Aveling, with a preface by Edward Aveling. London, 1898

=== Translations ===
- Ernst Haeckel, The Pedigree of Man. And Other Essays. Translated, with the Authors permission, from the German. Freethought Publishing, London 1883. (International Library of Science and Freethought, 6)
- Karl Marx, Capital A critical analysis of capitalist production. Translated from the third edition, by Samuel Moore and Edward Aveling and edited by Frederick Engels. Vol. I. Swan Sonnenschein, Lowrey & Co. London 1887.
- L.A. Tikhomirov, Russia: Political and Social.By L. Tikhomirov Translated from the French by Edward Aveling, D.Sc. Vol. I. London: Swan Sonnenschein & Co., 1888.
- Frederick Engels, Socialism: Utopian and Scientific London: Swan Sonnenschein & Co., 1892.
- The Working Class Movement in England: Brief Historical Sketch. Preface by Wilhelm Liebknecht, trans. by Edward Aveling, 1896
