= Socialist League =

Socialist League may refer to one of several organisations:

- Socialist League (Canada)
- Socialist League (Finland)
- Socialist League (Germany)
- Socialist League (Italy)
- Socialist League (Sweden)
- Socialist League (Venezuela)
- Socialist League (UK, 1885), a split from the Social Democratic Federation associated with William Morris
- Socialist League (UK, 1932), a split from the Independent Labour Party associated with Stafford Cripps
- Socialist Action (UK), founded 1982, originally officially known as the Socialist League
- Socialist League of Palestine
