= Socialist League (Sweden) =

Socialist League (in Swedish: Socialistiska Förbundet) was a Trotskyist organization in Sweden. SF was founded on December 15, 1979 when the 'Bolshevik Fraction' was expelled from the Communist Workers League (KAF, later the Socialist Party). The 'Bolshevik Fraction' within the United Secretariat of the Fourth International was formed in 1978, as an extension of the 'Bolshevik Tendency' formed in 1976.

SF was affiliated to the International Workers League (LIT) of Nahuel Moreno. SF published Socialistiskt Perspektiv.

In 1982 SF was joined by the Program Tendency. PT had worked as a fraction within KAF but left to join SF. PT continued to work as a fraction within SF.

In 1985 PT launched the Workers Association of Malmberget, which won a seat in Gällivare in the municipal elections. Following the elections PT managed to take control over SF, partly by excluding a minority. The excluded minority soon split in two, but regrouped as Revolutionary Socialists in 1987.

Under PTs leadership SF became associated with a minority tendency within LIT. Later it left LIT altogether.

Ahead of the 1988 elections SF suffered another split. The SF decided to give critical support the candidacy of SP. PT, who had proposed a critical vote for the Social Democrats, refused to go along with this, and left to form the International Group.

In 1990 SF merged into the Workers List. As that project crumbled, the group originating from SF left it in 1993 and formed Workers List - Alternative. In 1994 the group rejoined SP.
