= Joseph Mazzini Wheeler =

English atheist and freethought writer (1850-1898)

Joseph Mazzini Wheeler (24 January 1850 – 5 May 1898) was an English atheist and freethought writer.

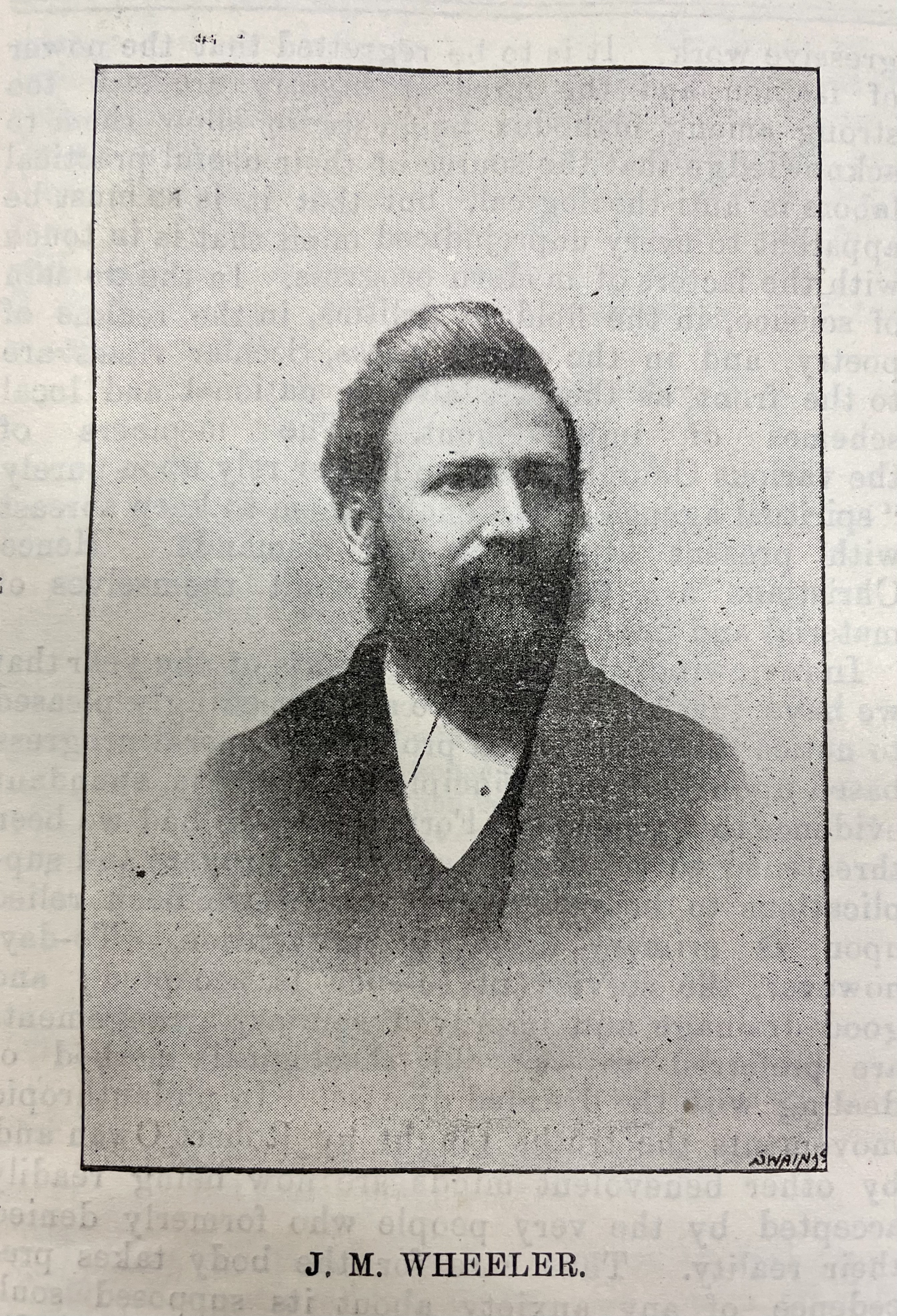
Reproduction of photograph of Joseph Mazzini Wheeler (published in the Freethinker, 1893)

== Biography ==
Wheeler was born in London. He briefly worked as a lithographer in Edinburgh. He became an atheist after reading the works of Charles Darwin, John Stuart Mill and Herbert Spencer. In 1868, he met George William Foote and they became lifelong friends. Wheeler worked as an editor for Foote's Freethinker journal. He was strongly anti-Christian.

His most well known work was A Biographical Dictionary of Freethinkers of All Ages (1889). He was vice-President of the National Secular Society.

Wheeler suffered from a mental breakdown and died in an asylum in 1898.

== Publications ==
- Frauds and Follies of the Fathers (1882)
- Hume's Essay on Miracles. A new edition, with an introduction commenting upon the views of Campbell, Paley, Mill, Greg, Mozley, Tyndall, Huxley, etc. By Joseph Mazzini Wheeler. 1882. London (Freethought Publ.). 3d.
- The Jewish Life of Christ (1885) [translator]
- Crimes of Christianity (1887) [with G. W. Foote]
- The Crimes of the Popes (1887) [with G. W. Foote]
- A Biographical Dictionary of Freethinkers of All Ages (1889)
- The Christian Doctrine of Hell (1890)
- Bible Studies: Essays on Phallic Worship and Other Curious Rites and Customs (1892)
- Voltaire: A Sketch of His Life and Works (1894) [with G. W. Foote]
- Footsteps of the Past (1895) [with an introduction by G. W. Foote]
- History of Freethought in England (uncompleted)

== See also ==
- J. M. Robertson
