= Thomas Aveling (minister) =

British independent congregational minister, author and memorialist

Thomas William Baxter Aveling (11 May 1815 – 3 July 1884) was a British independent congregational minister, author and memorialist.

== Life ==
Born at Castletown in the Isle of Man, Aveling was the son of a soldier and an Irish mother. He received his theological training at Highbury College, London.

In 1838, Aveling was appointed to the pastorate of the Kingsland Congregational Church in Hackney. Reportedly an eloquent and popular pastor, he served at Kingsland for the rest of his life.

From 1848 to 1853 he edited the Jewish Herald, the monthly journal of the British Society for the Propagation of the Gospel Among the Jews (BSPG). He went on a Sabbatical as the guest of Frederick David Mocatta on a nine-month journey through France and Italy to Egypt, Syria and the Holy Land. On his return he published a book: Voices from Many Waters, Travels in the Lands of the Tiber, the Jordan and the Nile: with Notices of Asia Minor, Constantinople, Athens, etc.(London: John Snow, 1856 2nd ed.)

In 1876, Aveling was appointed chairman of the Congregational Union. He also held the post of the honorary secretary of the Asylum for Fatherless Children at Purley.

Aveling published a large number of sermons and other pieces. His most important work was the Memorials of the Clayton Family (8 volumes, 1867). This book contained correspondence between Selina Hastings, Countess of Huntingdon, and prominent British religious authorities of the 18th century.

The Dictionary of National Biography (1885) incorrectly states that "some years before his death he received from the Washington University the degree of D.D." Aveling actually received his honorary D.D. degree in 1874 from Howard University in Washington, D.C.

He married Mary Ann, daughter of Thomas Goodall, farmer and innkeeper, of Wisbech; she died in 1877. Among their eight children was the scientist and secularist Edward Aveling.

Aveling died at Reedham, near Caterham, on 3 July 1884, and was buried in Abney Park Cemetery, London.
