= Thomas Tipping Aveling =

Thomas Tipping Aveling (1770 – 22 September 1820) was an Anglican priest in the late 18th and early 19th centuries.

Aveling was born in Bedfordshire, England to William Aveling (1743-1790) and Elizabeth Tipping (1744-1801). Educated at Corpus Christi College, Cambridge. He held incumbencies at Aspley Guise and Husborne Crawley. He was Archdeacon of Derry from 1813 until his death.
