= 1917 in New Zealand =

- Decades: 1890s; 1900s; 1910s; 1920s; 1930s
- See also: History of New Zealand; List of years in New Zealand; Timeline of New Zealand history

The following lists events that happened during 1917 in New Zealand.

== Incumbents ==
=== Regal and viceregal ===
- Head of State – George V
- Governor – Arthur Foljambe, 2nd Earl of Liverpool, until 28 June
- Governor-General – Arthur Foljambe, 2nd Earl of Liverpool, from 28 June
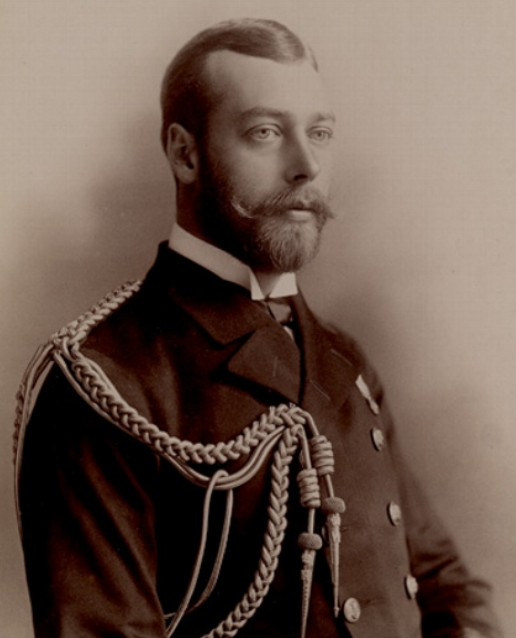
George V

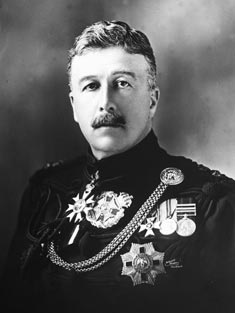
Lord Liverpool

=== Government ===
The 19th New Zealand Parliament continues as a grand coalition led by the Reform Party. The general election due this year is deferred because of World War I.

- Speaker of the House – Frederic Lang (Reform Party)
- Prime Minister – William Massey (Reform Party)
- Minister of Finance – Joseph Ward
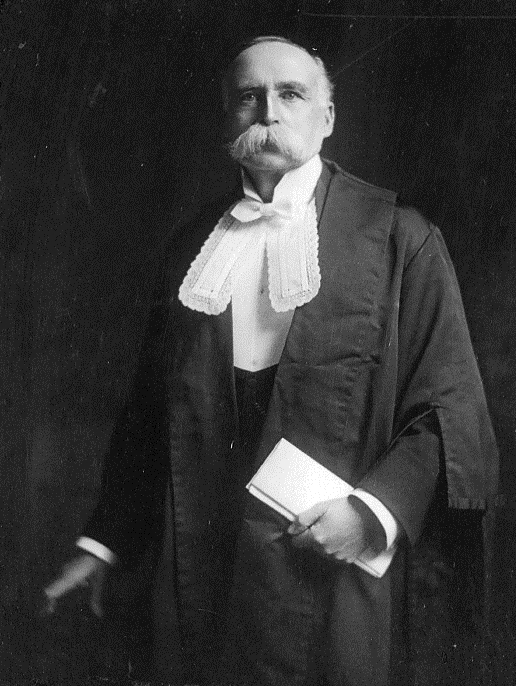
Frederic Lang

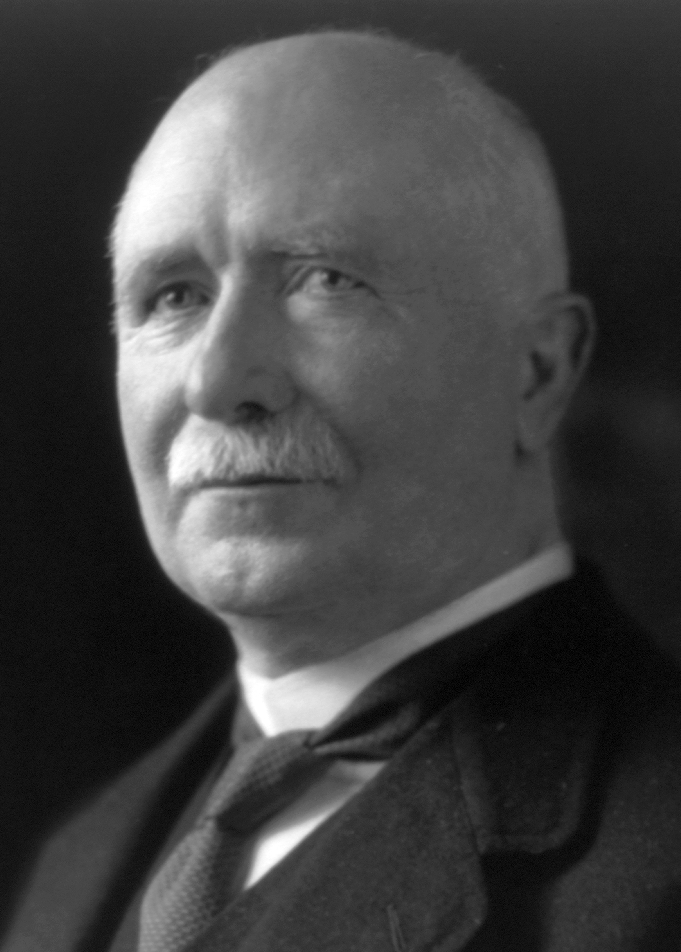
William Massey

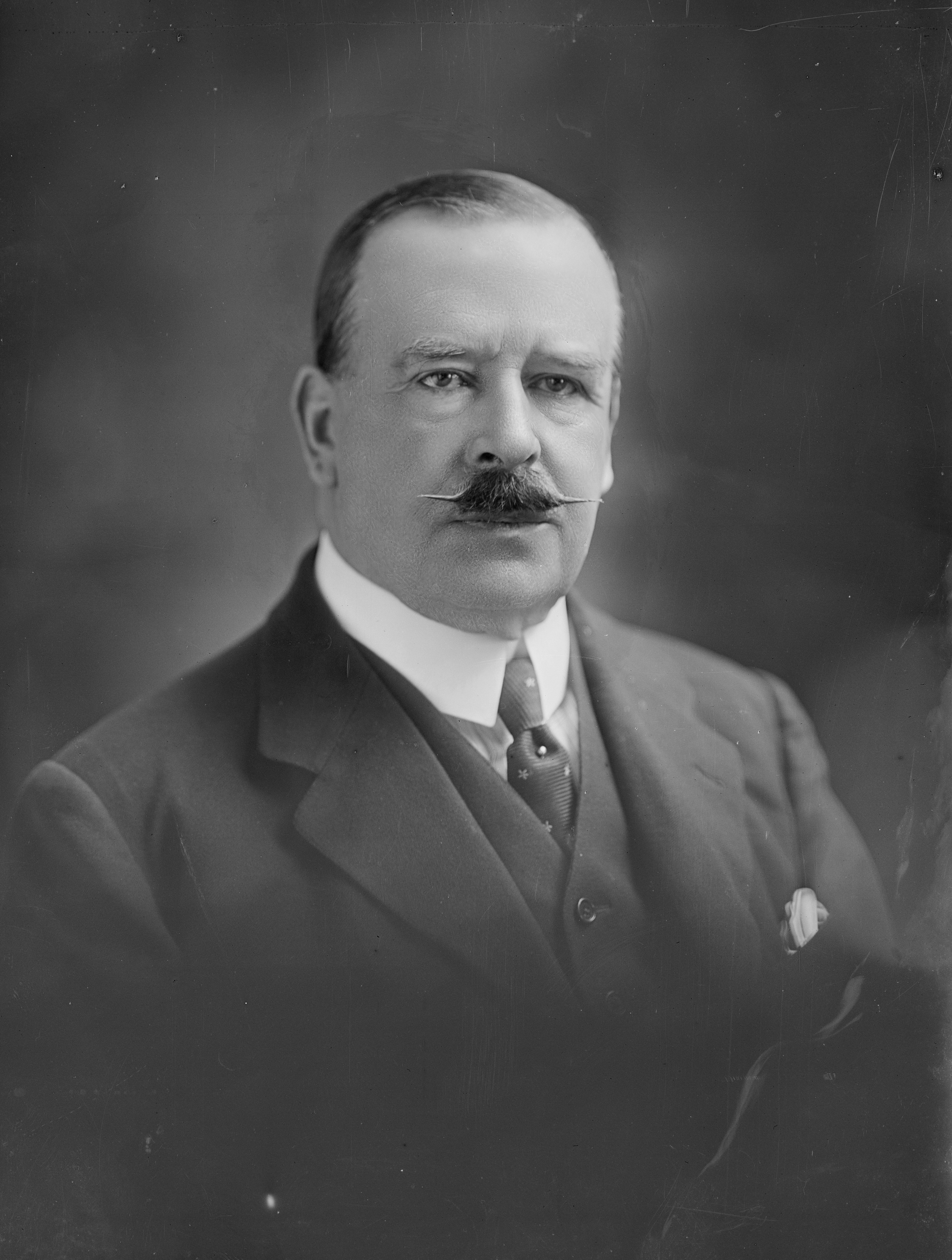
Joseph Ward

=== Parliamentary opposition ===
- Leader of the Opposition – Joseph Ward (Liberal Party). Ward retains the title even though he is part of the coalition government.
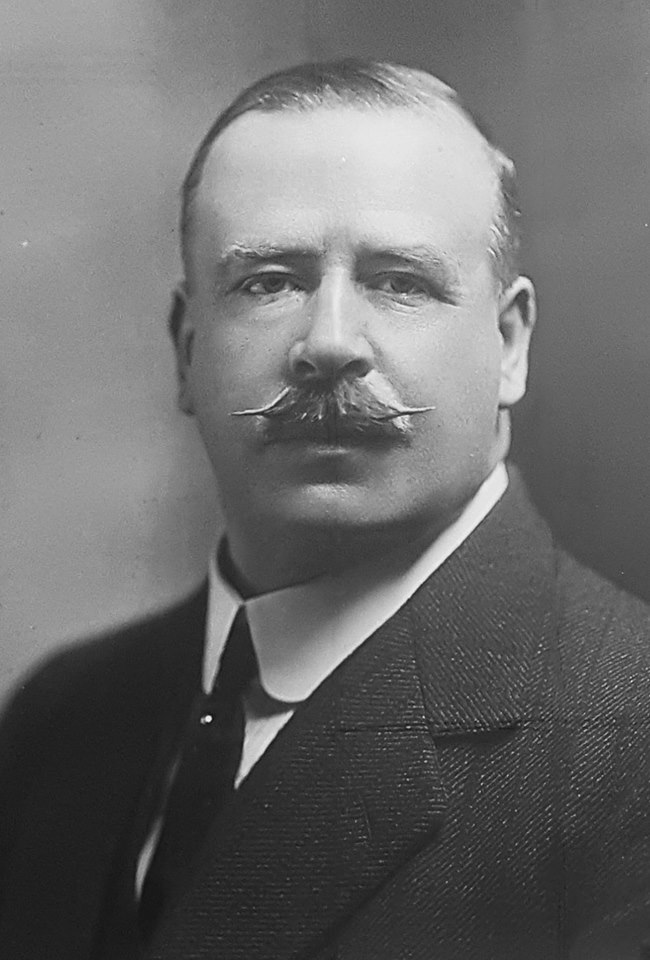
Joseph Ward

=== Judiciary ===
- Chief Justice – Sir Robert Stout
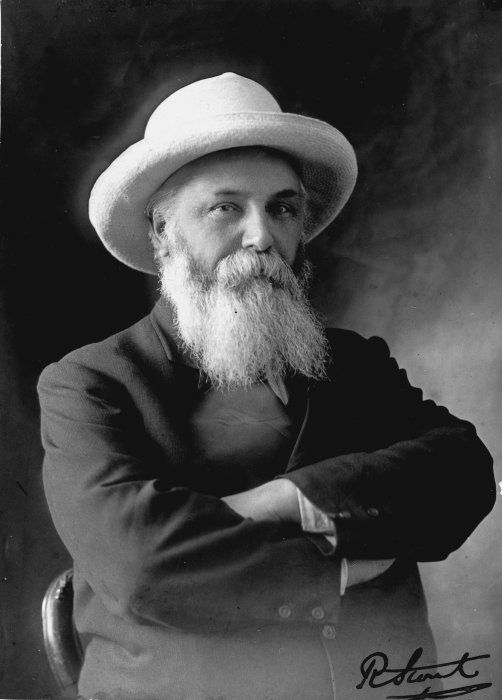
Robert Stout

=== Main centre leaders ===
- Mayor of Auckland – James Gunson
- Mayor of Wellington – John Luke
- Mayor of Christchurch – Henry Holland
- Mayor of Dunedin – James Clark
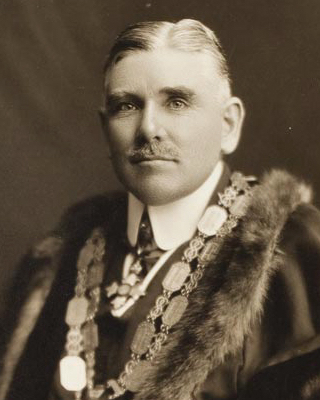
James Gunson

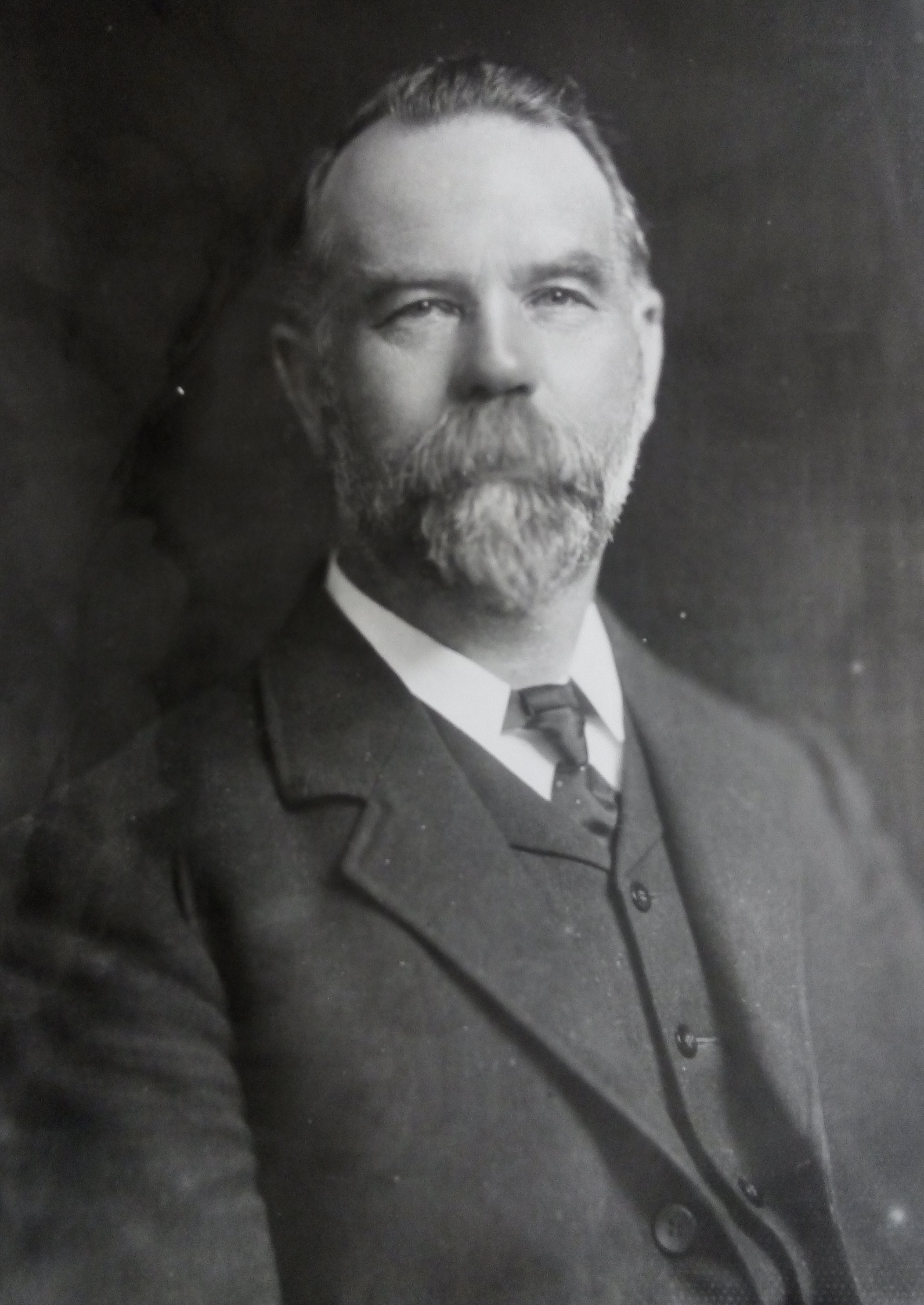
John Luke

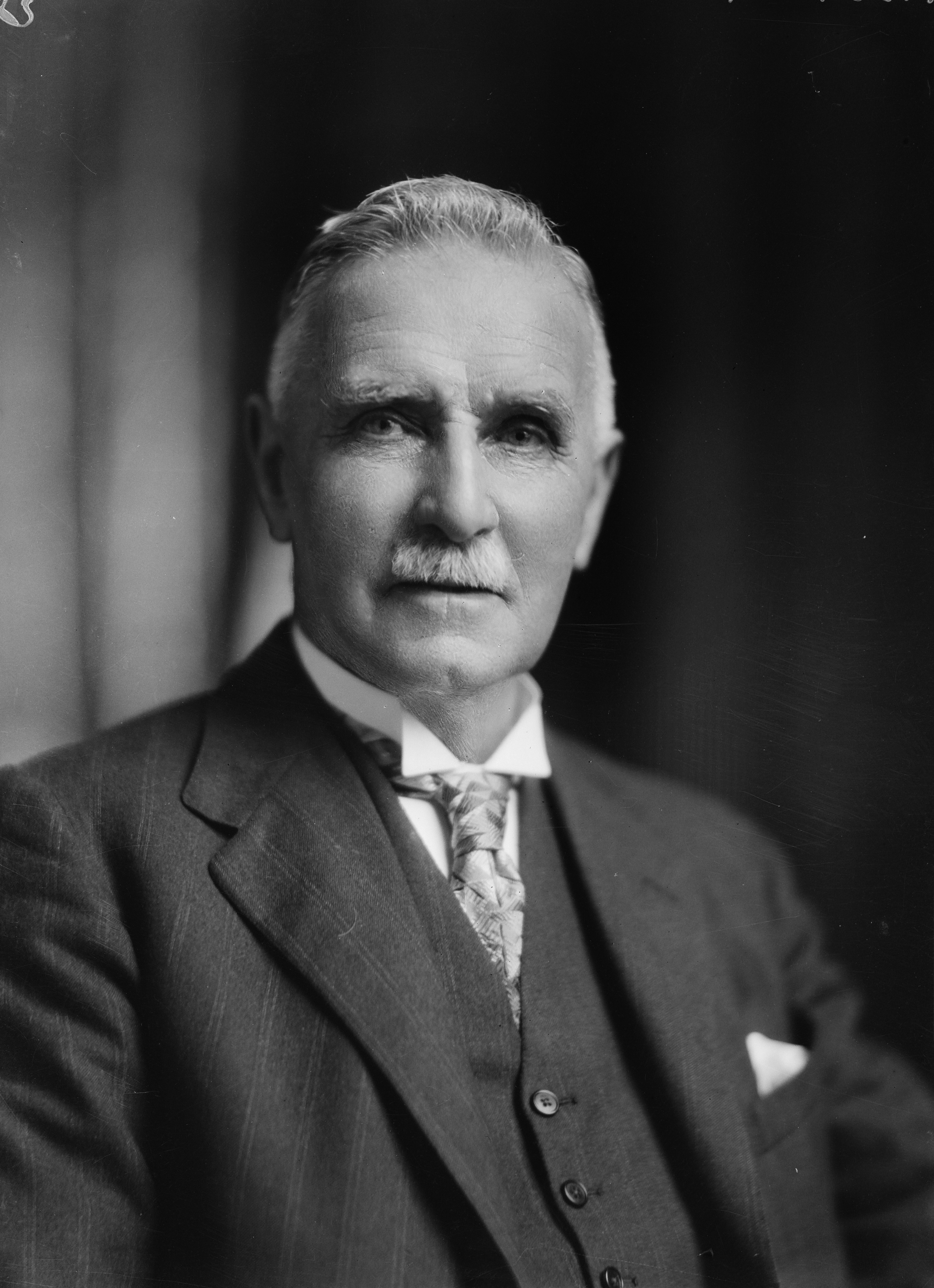
Henry Holland

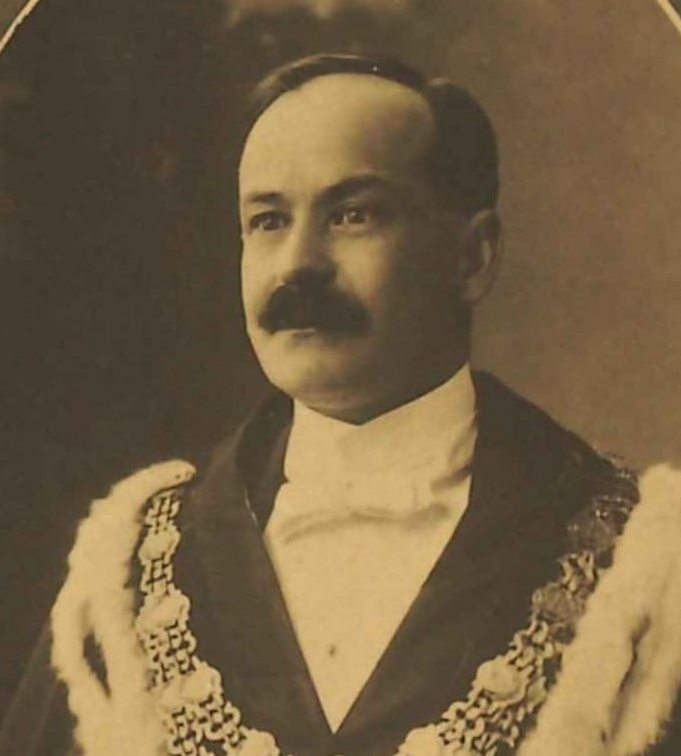
James Clark

== Events ==
- April – The first Caudron biplane purchased by Henry Wigram for the Canterbury Aviation Company arrives.
- 1 May – The New Zealand Rifle Brigade (Earl of Liverpool's Own) is formed as the 3rd Brigade of the New Zealand Division, part of the New Zealand Expeditionary Force.
- 7 May – Cecil McKenzie Hill makes the first flight for the Canterbury Aviation Company.
- June – Pilot training by the Canterbury Aviation Company commences at Sockburn.
- 24 September – Ten New Zealand soldiers are killed in England in the Bere Ferrers rail accident.
- 20 October – 850 New Zealand soldiers are killed in the Second Battle of Passchendaele, the greatest loss of life in a single day in the military history of New Zealand.
- 1 December – Six o’clock closing of hotel bars is introduced as a wartime measure.

Undated

- "Extraordinary and continuous rainfall" throughout the year causes "enormous damage to roads and bridges", and "the country became waterlogged", according to the Public Works Statement.
- The West Coast Times, established in 1865, is merged into the Hokitika Guardian and Star.

== Arts and literature ==
See 1917 in art, 1917 in literature, Category:1917 books

=== Music ===
See: 1917 in music

=== Film ===
See: Category:1917 film awards, 1917 in film, List of New Zealand feature films, Cinema of New Zealand, Category:1917 films

== Sport ==
=== Golf ===
- The New Zealand Open championship and National Amateur Championships are not held due to the war.

=== Horse racing ===
==== Harness racing ====
- New Zealand Trotting Cup – Adelaide Direct
- Auckland Trotting Cup – Steel Bell (2nd win)

==== Thoroughbred racing ====
- New Zealand Cup – Meelaus
- Auckland Cup – Fiery Cross
- Wellington Cup – Bunting
- New Zealand Derby – Estland

=== Lawn bowls ===
The national outdoor lawn bowls championships are held in Wellington.

- Men's singles champion – C.R. Ingram (Wellington Bowling Club)
- Men's pair champions – A. Sawyer, J.J. Martin (skip) (Turanganui Bowling Club)
- Men's fours champions – J.S. Ryrie, A.R. Coltman, W. Coltman, G.S. Osmond (skip) (Auckland Bowling Club)

=== Rugby union ===
- The Ranfurly Shield (held by Wellington) is not contested as interprovincial matches are cancelled due to the war.

=== Soccer ===
- Provincial league champions:
  - Auckland – Brotherhood
  - Canterbury – Linwood
  - Hawke's Bay – Waipukurau
  - Otago – Northern
  - Southland – No competition
  - Wanganui – No competition
  - Wellington – No competition

== Births ==
=== January ===
- 13 January – Doris Strachan, athlete
- 19 January – Agnes Ell, cricketer
- 20 January – Emily Carpenter, home science academic, adult educationalist, consumer advocate
- 25 January – Rosalie Gascoigne, sculptor
- 27 January – John Pattison, World War II pilot
- 28 January – Jack Hatchard, association footballer
- 31 January
  - Erich Geiringer, writer, doctor, anti-nuclear weapons activist
  - Frank Gill, air force officer, politician

=== February ===
- 19 February
  - Morrie McHugh, boxer, rugby union player
  - Peg Taylor, cricketer
- 26 February – Clyde Jeffery, politician, mayor of Napier (1974–83)

=== March ===
- 1 March – Bill Sutton, artist
- 9 March – Clarrie Gordon, boxer
- 10 March – Tom Pritchard, cricketer
- 20 March – Haddon Donald, soldier, politician, sports shooter
- 22 March – Phil Holloway, politician
- 26 March – Ruth Gilbert, poet

=== April ===
- 13 April – Bruce Ferguson, soldier
- 18 April – Brian Mason, geochemistry, mineralogist, meteoriticist

=== May ===
- 6 May – Roy Scott, cricketer
- 21 May – Margaret Milne, potter
- 22 May – Charlie Munro, jazz musician

=== June ===
- 10 June – Jack Henry, industrialist
- 11 June – Tom Davis, Cook Islands politician
- 25 June – Nora Crawford, police officer

=== July ===
- 1 July – Maurice Carter, property developer, politician, philanthropist
- 6 July – Arthur Lydiard, runner, athletics coach
- 7 July – John Crichton, furniture and interior designer
- 13 July – Frank Carpay, ceramics, textile and graphic designer
- 14 July – Doug Zohrab, public servant, diplomat
- 19 July – Lewis Johnston, cricket umpire
- 21 July – Jock Newall, association footballer
- 23 July – Douglas Goodfellow, businessman, philanthropist
- 27 July – Ron Meek. economist and social scientist
- 31 July – Derek Ward, World War II pilot

=== August ===
- 1 August – Esme Tombleson, politician
- 3 August – Eddie Isbey, politician
- 7 August – Arthur Cresswell, cricketer
- 24 August – Ruth Park, writer

=== September ===
- 2 September – Jack Scholes, sailor
- 6 September – Cecil Hight, World War II pilot
- 7 September – Ewen Solon, actor
- 16 September – David Lewis, sailor, Polynesian scholar
- 23 September – Wiremu Te Tau Huata, Anglican priest, military chaplain
- 26 September – James Coe, artist, art teacher, industrial designer, ergonomist
- 30 September – Denis Rogers, politician, mayor of Hamilton (1959–68)

=== October ===
- 2 October – Rosaleen Norton, artist, occultist
- 17 October
  - Martin Donnelly, cricketer, rugby union player
  - John Oswald Sanders, missionary
- 18 October – Roy White, rugby union player
- 31 October – Evan Mackie, World War II pilot

=== November ===
- 6 November – Henry Walters, cricketer
- 17 November – Tom Larkin, public servant, diplomat
- 25 November – Paul Beadle, sculptor, medallist

=== December ===
- 2 December – Betty Batham, marine biologist
- 7 December – Bert Roth, librarian, historian
- 8 December – Alan Stewart, rugby union player, university administrator
- 11 December – Owen Snedden, Roman Catholic bishop
- 12 December – Alan Deere, military pilot, author
- 13 December – Keith Hay, construction company founder, politician, conservative activist
- 24 December – Ronald Triner, road cyclist

== Deaths ==
=== January–February ===
- 3 February – Robert McNab, politician (born 1864)
- 17 February
  - Graham Gow, government trade representative (born 1850)
  - Sir George McLean, politician (born 1834)
- 22 February – Hugh Murray-Aynsley, politician (born 1828)

=== March–April ===
- 6 March
  - Tame Parata, politician (born c.1837)
  - William Salmond, Presbyterian minister, theologian (born 1835)
- 11 March – William Hosking, doctor (born 1841)
- 13 March – Percy Dix, vaudeville company manager (born 1866)
- 27 March – Joseph Braithwaite, bookseller, politician, mayor of Dunedin (1905–06) (born 1848)
- 30 March – Ferdinand Holm, mariner, ship owner (born 1844)
- 23 April – Robert Bruce, politician, conservationist (born 1843)

=== May–June ===
- 2 May – Alfred Lee Smith, politician (born 1838)
- 7 June
  - Bill Bussell, rugby league player (born 1887)
  - George Sellars, rugby union player (born 1886)
- 8 June
  - George Bollinger, soldier, diarist (born 1890)
  - Charles Henry Brown, military leader (born 1872)
  - Thomas Culling, World War I flying ace (born 1896)
- 20 June – Reg Taylor, rugby union player (born 1889)
- 22 June – John Lecky, rugby union player (born 1863)

=== July–August ===
- 8 July – Alexander McKay, geologist (born 1841)
- 14 July
  - Robert Batley, storekeeper, sheep farmer (born 1849)
  - Alexander Bruce, politician (born c.1839)
- 15 July – Bill Mackrell, rugby union and rugby league player (born 1881)
- 23 July – James Gore, politician, mayor of Dunedin (1881–82) (born 1834)
- 27 July – Arthur Brown, Mayor of Wellington
- 30 July – William Baldwin, politician (born 1836)
- 31 July – William Henry Dillon Bell, politician (born 1884)
- 4 August
  - Purakau Maika, newspaper editor and publisher (born c.1852)
  - Cecil Perry, cricketer (born 1846)
- 5 August – Don Buck, gum digger (born c.1869)
- 6 August – Charles James, rugby league player (born 1891)
- 7 August – Francis Earl Johnston, army officer (born 1871)
- 14 August – William Sanders, naval officer, Victoria Cross recipient (born 1883)
- 24 August – Alfred Kidd, politician, mayor of Auckland (1901–03) (born 1851)
- 26 August – William Lane, journalist, utopian (born 1861)

=== September–October ===
- 4 October – Dave Gallaher. rugby union player (born 1873)
- 6 October – John Davies Ormond, politician (born 1831)
- 12 October
  - Henry Du Vall, rugby league player (born 1886)
  - George Augustus King, military officer (born 1885)
- 20 October – Elise Kemp, nurse (born 1881)
- 22 October – Bob Fitzsimmons, boxer (born 1863)
- 27 October – William Beehan, politician (born 1853)

=== November–December ===
- 10 November – Charles King, cricketer (born 1847)
- 13 November – Cecil Fitzroy, politician, mayor of Hastings (1894–99) (born 1844)
- 15 November – Frank Twisleton, soldier, writer (born 1873)
- 29 November – Ellen Greenwood, schoolteacher, social worker (born 1837)
- 12 December – Sir Charles Bowen, politician (born 1830)
- 14 December – George Wilson, cricketer (born 1887)
- 23 December – Clive Franklyn Collett, World War I flying ace (born 1886)

== See also ==
- History of New Zealand
- List of years in New Zealand
- Military history of New Zealand
- Timeline of New Zealand history
- Timeline of New Zealand's links with Antarctica
- Timeline of the New Zealand environment
