= John Gow (disambiguation) =

John Gow (1698–1725) was a Scottish pirate.

John may also refer to:

- John Graham Gow (1850–1917), New Zealand commercial traveller and government trade representative
- John Gow (footballer, born 1859), Scottish football (soccer) player (Queen's Park FC and Scotland)
- John Gow (footballer, born 1869), Scottish football (soccer) player (Rangers FC and Scotland)
- John Gow (skier), Canadian para-alpine skier
