= William Birch (settler) =

William John Birch (February 1842 – 12 May 1920) was an English settler in New Zealand. He and his brother leased a large area in the upper Rangitīkei/Inland Pātea, in the central North Island, for a sheep run.

== Early life ==
Birch was born in February 1842 in Oxfordshire, England. He was the second son of William John Birch of Pudlicote House, near Chilson, Oxfordshire. His father had inherited wealth, but lost much of it in poorly performing investments. After schooling in England and Germany, Birch took a two-year course at the Royal Agricultural College in Cirencester.

Birch went to New Zealand on the Wild Duck in February 1860. He was initially in Wellington, then took a position in the Hawke's Bay area, with the runholder Ashton St Hill, by the Tukituki River. He rose from cadet to manager there.

Azim, William's elder brother, had joined the 44th (East Essex) Regiment of Foot, becoming an ensign in 1855. The regiment took part in the Crimean War, and in August 1857 left for India. Azim sold out his commission as lieutenant, in 1863. Both brothers served in campaigns of the New Zealand Wars during the 1860s.

== The sheep run ==
The Birch brothers, Azim and William, leased a sheep run from Māori in the Kaimanawa-Oruamatua Block in the upper Rangitīkei/Inland Pātea, after negotiations begun in 1867. The area was 46,580 hectares (115,100 acres). They had relied on the backing of Donald McLean, succeeding against a number of other interested parties.

The brothers employed Robert Thompson Batley in 1868, and Te Kooti's War broke out that year. Batley drove the farm's sheep to Thomas McDonnell at Poutu, at the outlet of Lake Rotoaira, in 1869. He left his job with the Birches to work with Hēnare Kepa at Moawhango in 1870, then by 1874 had returned to the Birches, becoming the manager of their Erewhon station. Wool from the farm was taken to Napier, an arduous journey for packhorses and mules carrying packs weighing 90 kilograms (200 lb) over the steep and rugged Gentle Annie above the Ngaruroro Gorge. In time there were upwards of 75,000 sheep on the run. Batley left what was by then the Erewhon Estate after ten years, going into business on his own account.

The Birch holdings were covered by the Owhaoko and Kaimanawa-Oruamatua Reinvestigation of Title Act of 1886. It followed a parliamentary inquiry during that year, involving also the Studholme family. This was a substantive investigation, one of the parties being Rēnata Kawepō with James Carroll as counsel; in contrast to a sketchy hearing held in 1875.

Birch constructed Stoneycroft in Hastings and was involved the construction of a road between Taihape and Napier.

== Homestead and division ==
The Birch Homestead at Moawhango was built by Azim and William Birch in 1868. The Homestead is a rare example of a house constructed from cob and has a Category I listing from Heritage New Zealand. William was appointed a Justice of the Peace in 1878. On 9 March 1881 Birch climbed Mount Ruapehu with his wife and George Beetham.

The brothers divided the station in 1897, Azim taking the homestead, and renaming it as Oruamatua. On retiring, Azim sold his holding to Thomas Lowry and Edward Watt. In 1906, he was living in London.

The "Erewhon" name, from Samuel Butler's 1872 book of that name, stuck to William Birch's holdings. At the 1920 auction his property was put up for sale as the Erewhon Estate.

== Later life ==
In 1905 William Birch was resident at Marton. He was on the Synod of the Anglican Church and on the board of trustees of Nga Tawa School in Marton. He died at Thoresby, Marton, on 12 May 1920, at age 78.

== Family ==
Birch was married in 1875 at Hathern, Leicestershire, England. He wedded his second-cousin Ethel Larden, youngest daughter of the late Rev. George Edge Larden and artist Lydia Larden.

On Birch's return to New Zealand, he built a house, Stoneycroft, in Hastings, as the family home. The couple had no children. They adopted William's nephew William Charles Caccia, who came to New Zealand in 1884, and changed his surname to Caccia-Birch in 1893. Caccia Birch House in Palmerston North is named after him.
