= Stoneycroft (disambiguation) =

Stoneycroft is a district of Liverpool.

Stoneycroft may also refer to:

- Stoneycroft House, a building in New Zealand
- Stoneycroft (Liverpool ward), England
