= Ethel Birch =

New Zealand settler (1853–1927)

Ethel Birch (née Lydia Etheldreda Larden, 1853 – 23 February 1927) was a British born New Zealand settler and the first European woman to climb Mount Ruapehu. She donated watercolours by her mother Lydia Larden to the Sarjeant Gallery in Whanganui.

== Biography ==
Birch was the youngest daughter of Lydia Larden (née Bucknill) and Rev George Edge Larden of Arkel Rectory, Shropshire. She married her cousin William John Birch in Oxford, England, on 16 December 1875. Birch had emigrated to New Zealand in 1860 and with his brother Azim established a large sheep station on the Oruamatua-Kaimanawa Block near Moawhango, in the Inland Patea area between Napier and Taihape. The block was later called Erewhon. After their marriage, the couple travelled to New Zealand and settled at Erewhon. In 1877 or 1878 they built a house Stoneycroft in Hastings where they spent summers and ran a stud. From 1887 they lived at and managed Erewhon. In 1899 they moved to Thorseby Farm, Marton, where they lived for the rest of their lives.

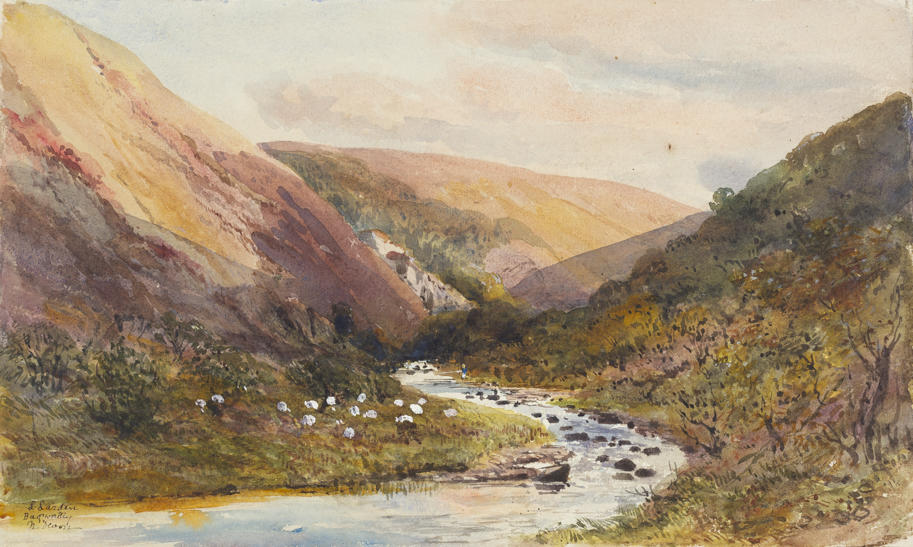
Badgworthy, North Devon. Painting by Lydia Larden, Ethel Birch's mother

The Birchs did not have any children but adopted William and Azim's nephew William Caccia in the early 1890s; Caccia changed his name by deed poll to William Charles Caccia Birch.

On 9 March 1881 Birch climbed Mount Ruapehu with her husband and George Beetham, becoming the first European woman to do so. She penned a letter to the Hawkes Bay Herald in 1886 regarding her observations of steam and clouds around Ruapehu.

In 1922 Birch donated watercolours by her mother Lydia Larden to the Sarjeant Gallery.

Birch died at Thorseby Farm on 23 February 1927 and her funeral took place at Old St Paul's in Wellington.

== See also ==
- Caccia Birch House
