= Caccia Birch House =

Homestead in Palmerston North, New Zealand

Caccia-Birch
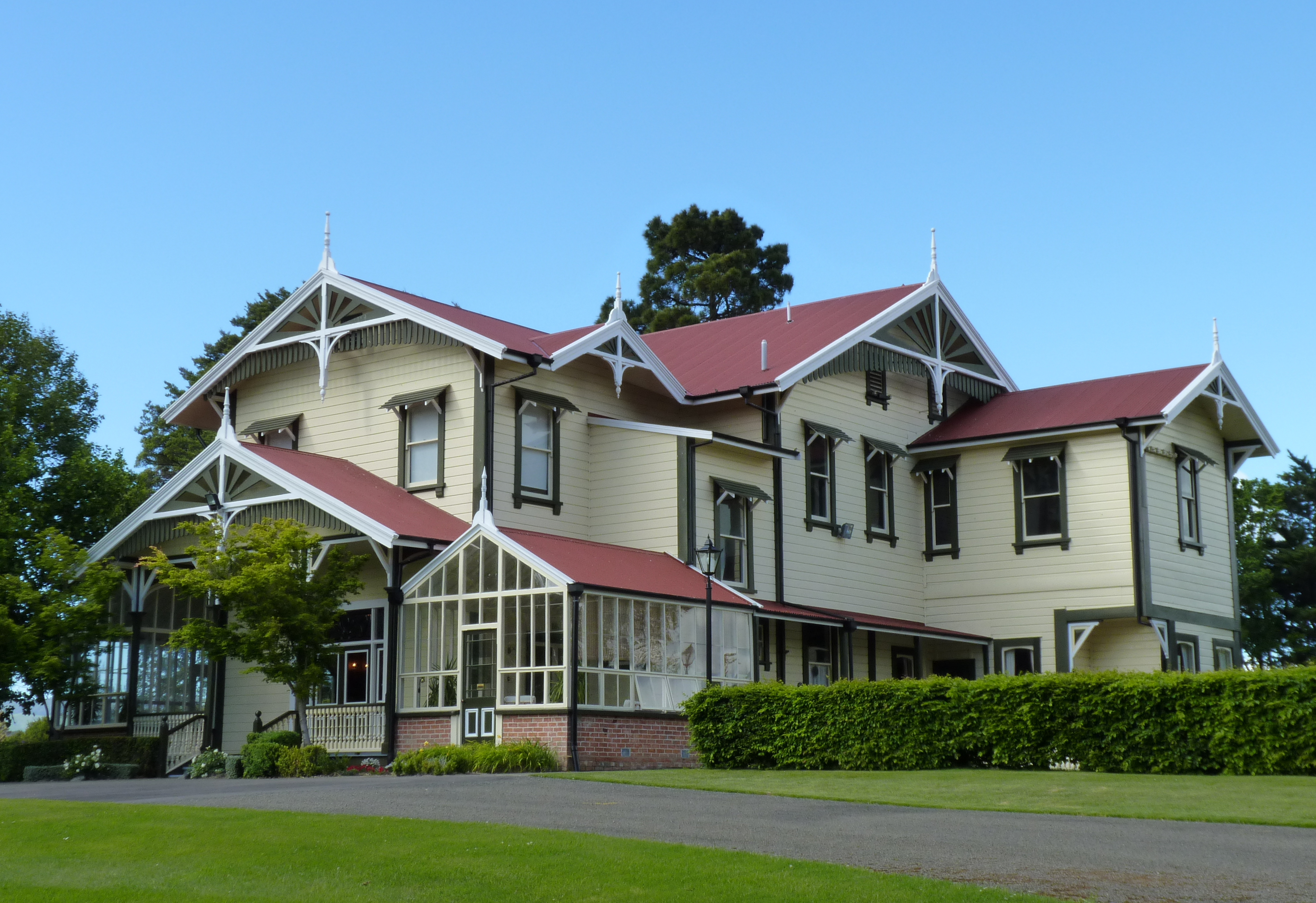
- Caccia-Birch, Palmerston North

General information
- Location: 40.36605°S 175.626734°E, 112-130 Te Awe Awe Street, Palmerston North, Palmerston North, New Zealand
- Named for: William Caccia-Birch
- Construction started: 1892
- Owner: Palmerston North City Council

Design and construction
- Architect: Ludolph Georg West

Heritage New Zealand – Category 1
- Designated: 24-Nov-1983
- Reference no.: 196

Caccia-Birch House (previously: Nannestad Homestead, Woodhey, Vice-Regal Residence, The Convalescent Home for Women of the Services) is a New Zealand colonial homestead and a Heritage New Zealand Category I Historic Place. It is located at 130 Te Awe Awe Street in the city of Palmerston North. Completed in 1892, it is named after William Caccia Birch and his wife Maude, who gifted the property to the government in 1941.

The property, owned by Palmerston North City Council, and operates as a conference and events venue on a cost-recovery basis. The Coach House Museum includes photos of the property's previous owners.

== History ==
The dwelling was designed by Danish-born architect Ludolph Georg West for Norwegian settler Jacob Nannestad and his wife Anna. In 1903, Englishman John Henderson Pollock Strang and his wife Mary purchased the property and named it "Woodhey". It became the temporary residence of the Governor-General of New Zealand, Lord Plunket, after a 1907 fire destroyed Parliament buildings. In 1921, William Caccia Birch purchased the property; he was the adopted son of William Birch and Ethel Birch. In 1937, a portion of the property, the Hokowhitu Lagoon, was given to the Palmerston North City Council while the rest of the property was given to the government in 1940. The Caccia Birch House was used by the military during the Second World War and subsequently became a convalescent home for servicewomen and nurses. It was used as an educational institution during the period from 1960 to 1976. In 1983, it was given to the city council. The Caccia Birch Trust Board was formed in 1989, and in 1992, it was turned into a conference and function centre.

== Geography ==
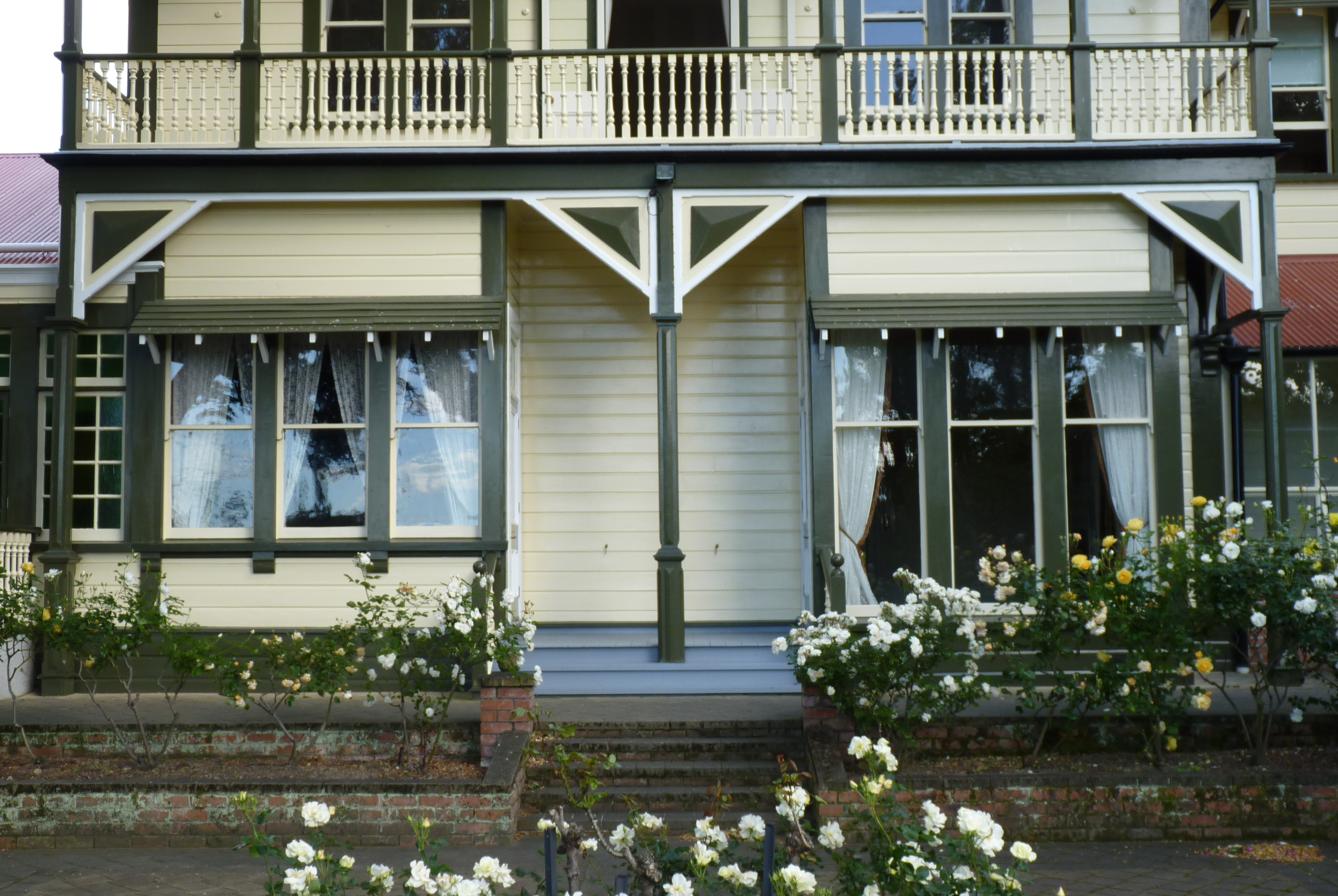
One of the entrances

The original property included a part of the Hokowhitu (Centennial) Lagoon. It is currently a 3 acres (1.2 ha) public property that overlooks the lagoon. It is 10 minutes from the airport.

== Architecture ==
The original Nannestad building was a two-storey dwelling constructed of native timber weatherboard with a corrugated iron roof and the exterior is of sunburst style. After 1903, two conservatories, two nurseries, servants' quarters, and a coach house were added by Strang. Lord Plunket added a billiard room, now named the Lord Plunket Room, as well as extra servants quarters that were subsequently demolished.

== Garden ==
The property includes a paved, sunken rose garden. It features a 100-year-old wisteria, as well as an American tulip tree, a Himalayan cedar, elms, and magnolias. The Manawatu Tree Trust planted native shrubs in the garden.

== Tourism ==
Located in a residential area, the property can be rented for functions.
