= Cecil Perry =

Australian cricketer

Personal information
- Full name: Cecil Thomas Henry Perry
- Born: 3 March 1846; Battery Point, Hobart, Van Diemen's Land
- Died: 4 August 1917 (aged 71); Timaru, South Canterbury, New Zealand
- Batting: Right-handed
- Relatives: Arthur Perry (brother)

Domestic team information
- Years: Team
- 1868/69: Tasmania
- 1870/71: Canterbury
- 1883/84–1893/94: South Canterbury
- Source: Cricinfo, 7 January 2016

Cecil Thomas Henry Perry (3 March 1846 – 4 August 1917) was a lawyer and a cricketer. He played first-class cricket in Australia for Tasmania and in New Zealand, where he practiced law, for Canterbury.

Born at Battery Point in Hobart in 1846, Perry was educated at Hobart High School. His father, who had been born in England, was a lawyer. He first played for Tasmania as a 16-year old in matches against the touring English team led by HH Stephenson, the first English side to tour Australia and New Zealand, and he played for Tasmanian and South of Tasmania sides in matches throughout the 1860s and in club cricket for the Derwent club in Hobart.

Perry's only first-class match for Tasmania was a February 1869 fixture against Victoria played at the Melbourne Cricket Ground. After being run out without scoring in his first innings, he scored 13 runs in his second, opening the Tasmanian batting. He qualified as a solicitor in Hobart in 1870 before moving to New Zealand during the 1870s. He was recognised as a solicitor in 1871, working alongside his brother Arthur Perry who had established a law firm at Timaru in South Canterbury during the mid-1860s. He played a first-class match for Canterbury in January 1871, taking three wickets and scoring ten runs in an innings defeat of Otago at the Hagley Oval in Christchurch. He continued to play cricket into the 1890s, playing for against touring English sides in 1879 and 1882, and for Wellington against the touring Australian side in December 1886. He played for South Canterbury during the 1890s.

Away from cricket, Perry played lawn tennis and was a keen golfer, playing until shortly before his death. As a lawyer, he was described as "sound, well-read, [and] capable", working alongside another lawyer after his brother died in 1898. He was the chairman of the Timaru Harbour Board and practiced law until a period of illness incapacitated him in the months before his death.

Married with no children, Perry died at Timaru in 1917. He was aged 71.
