= Lydia Larden =

British artist (1826–1901)

Lydia Larden (1826 – 1901) was a British artist. Some of her watercolours are in the collection of the Sarjeant Gallery in Whanganui, New Zealand.

== Biography ==
Larden was born Mary Lydia Fanny Bucknill in 1826 the daughter of Samuel Bucknill and Mary Birch. She married the Rev George Edge Larden in 1847 and they had four children. One of their daughters Frances Mary Larden died in June 1913 and their son Henry Neville Larden in February 1920.

Another daughter Lydia Etheldreda (known as Ethel) married William Birch and emigrated to New Zealand. In 1922 she donated a collection of Larden's paintings to the Sarjeant Gallery in Whanganui.

== Gallery of artworks ==
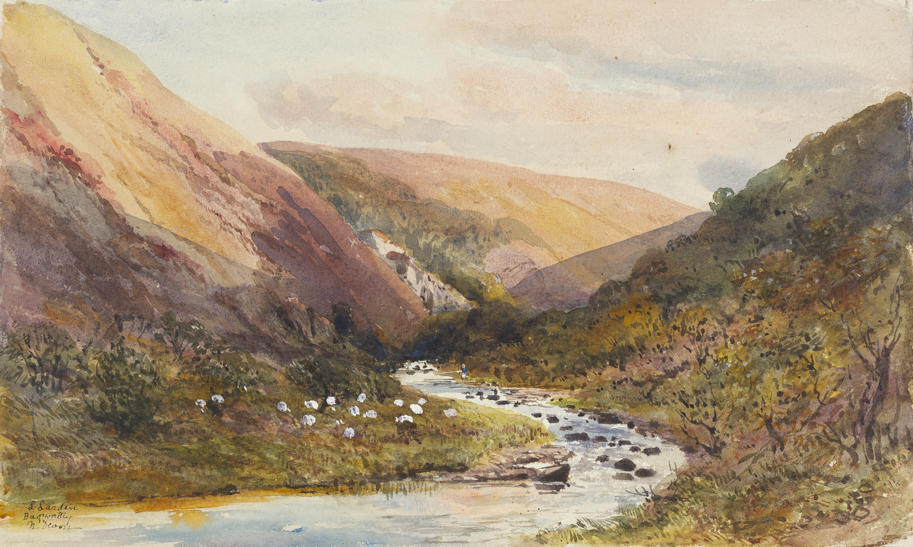

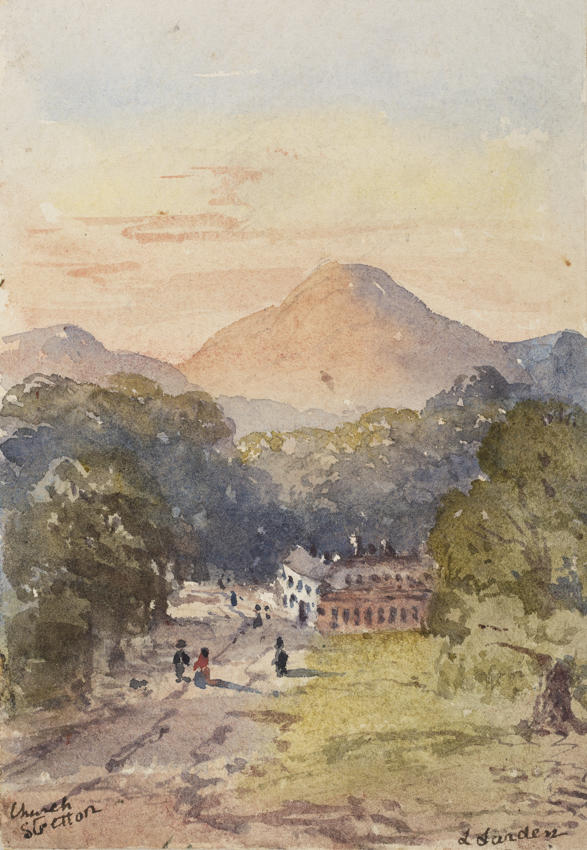

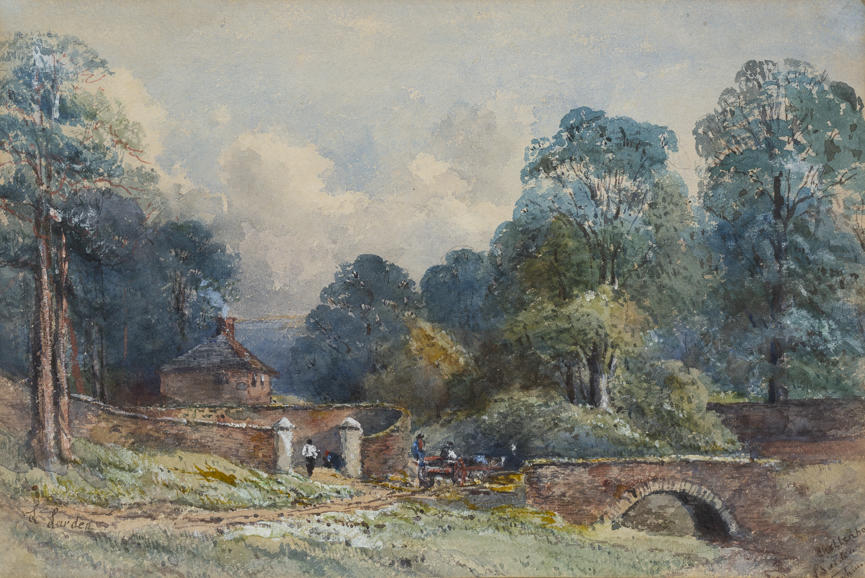

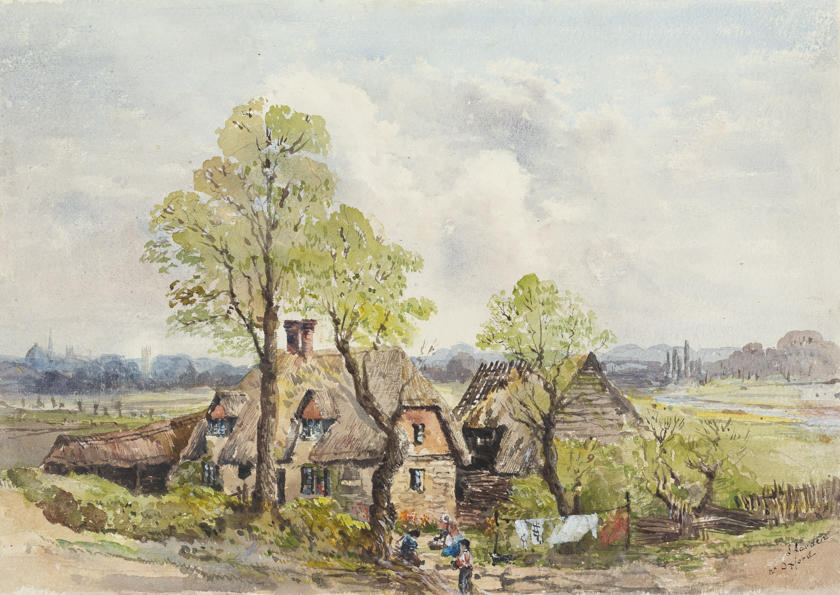

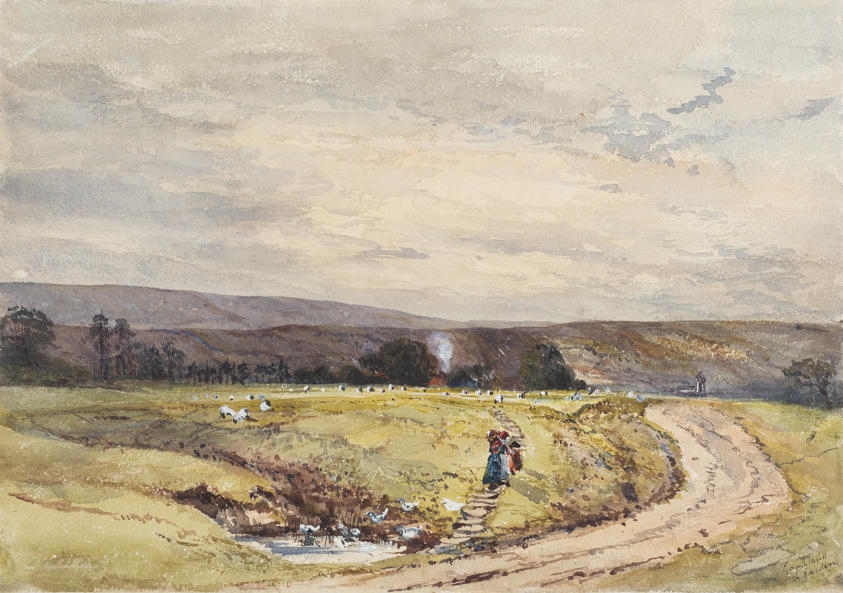

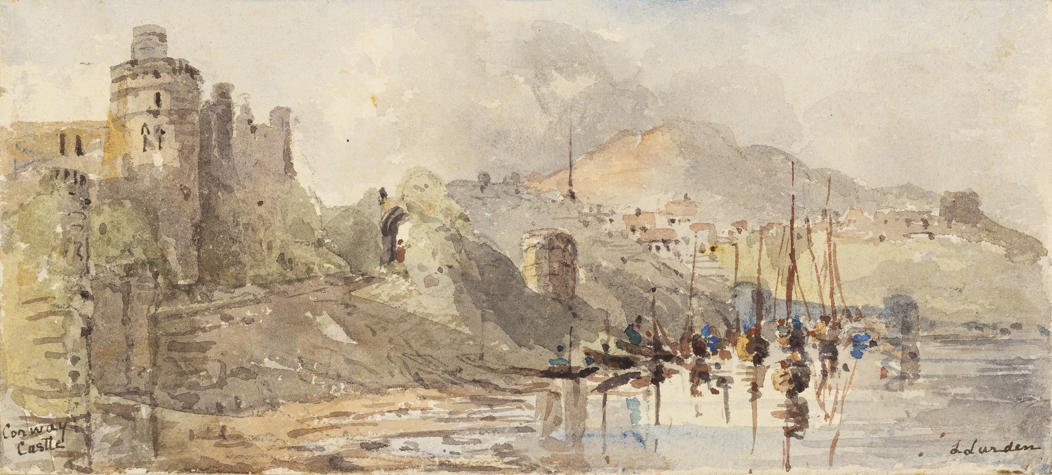

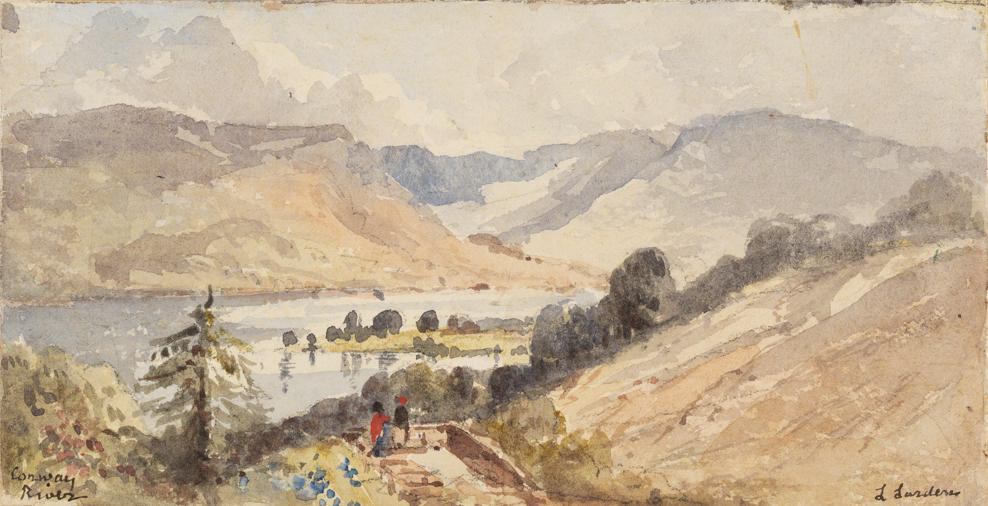

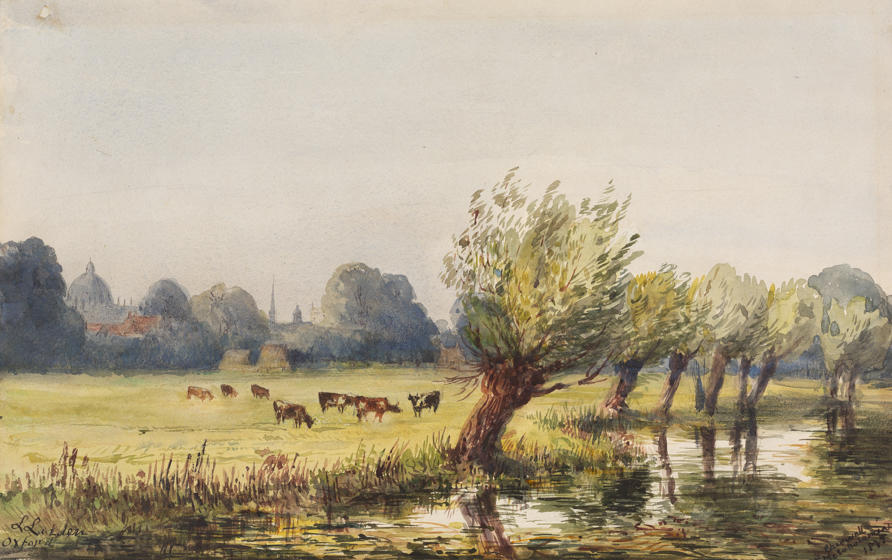

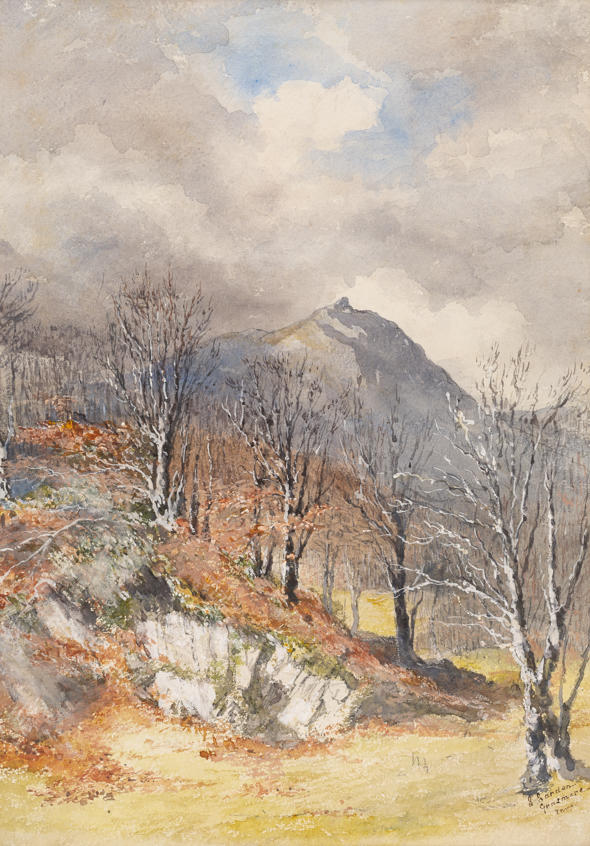

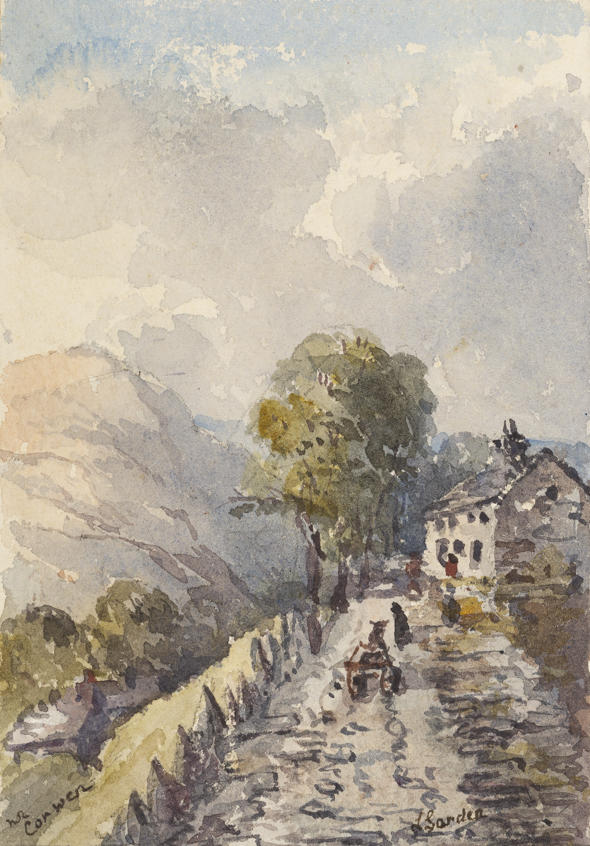

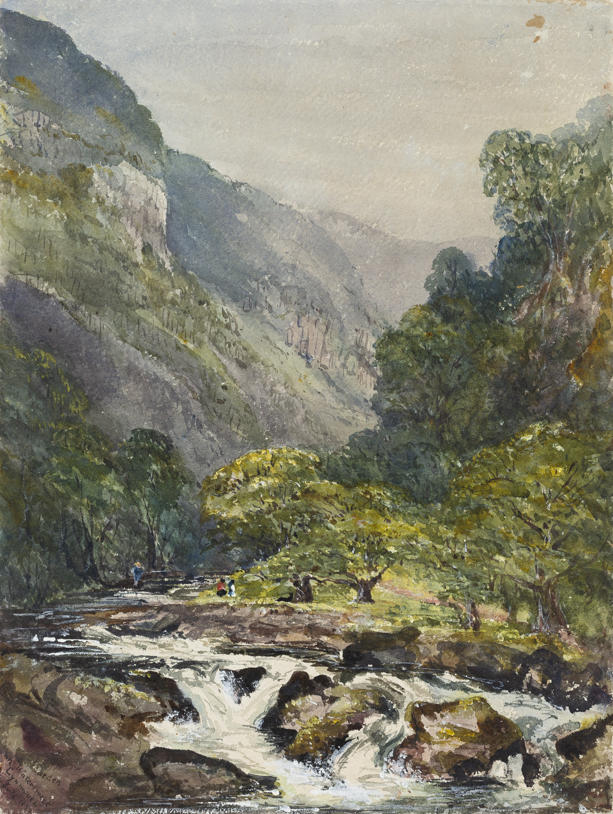

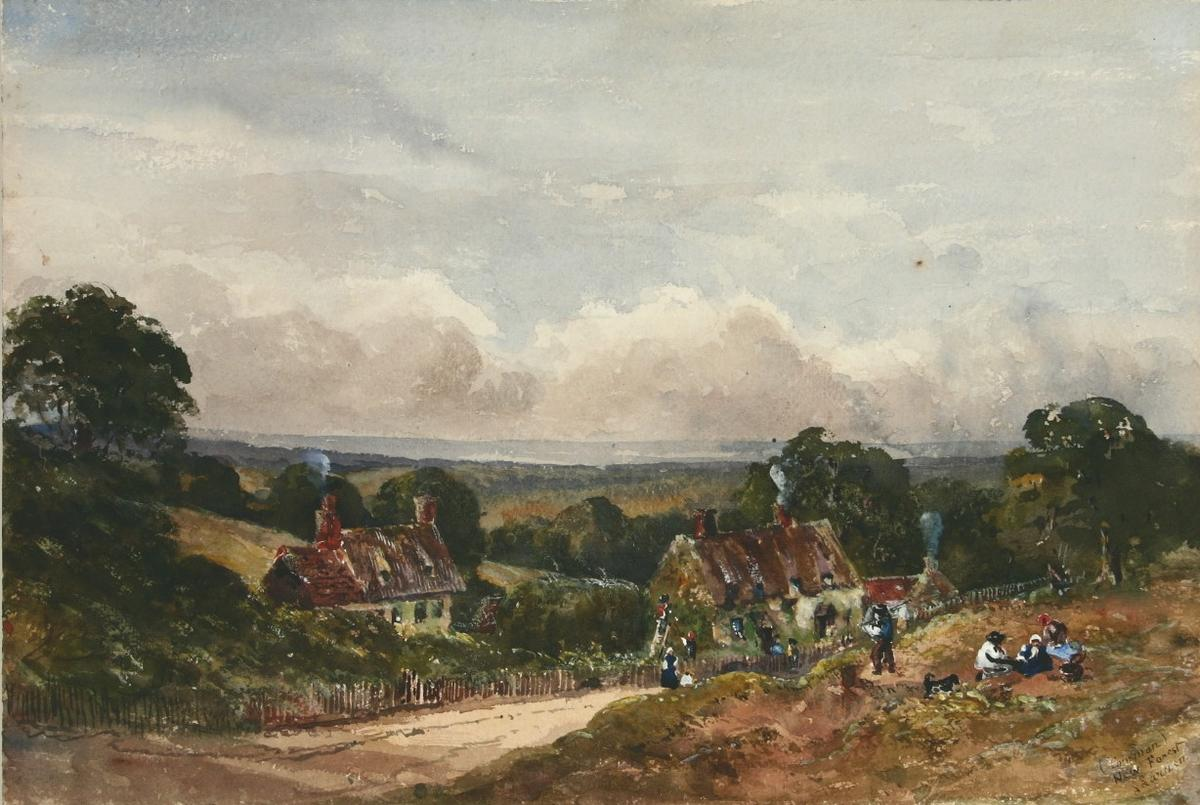

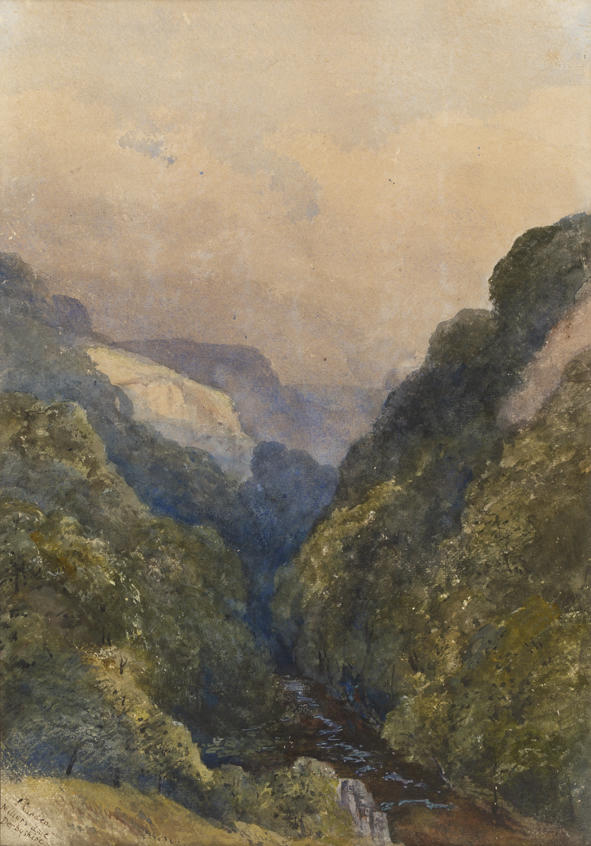

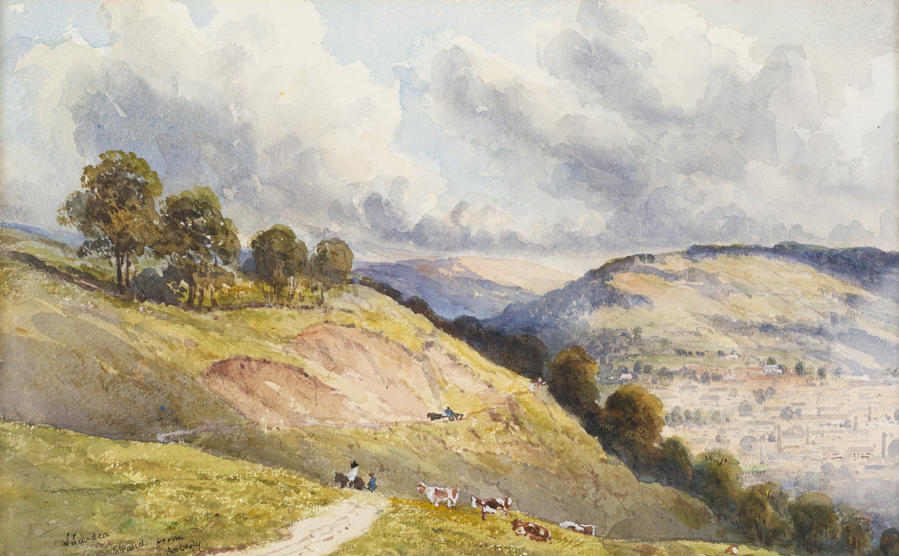

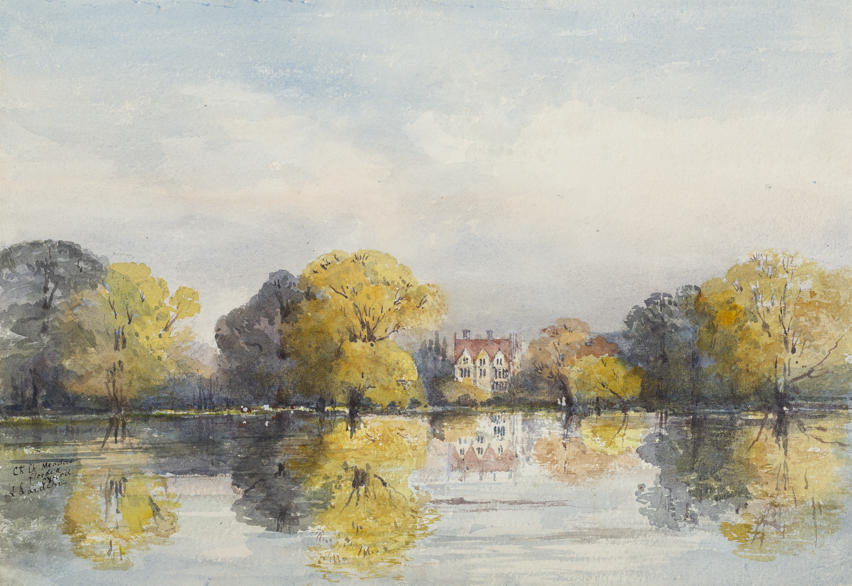

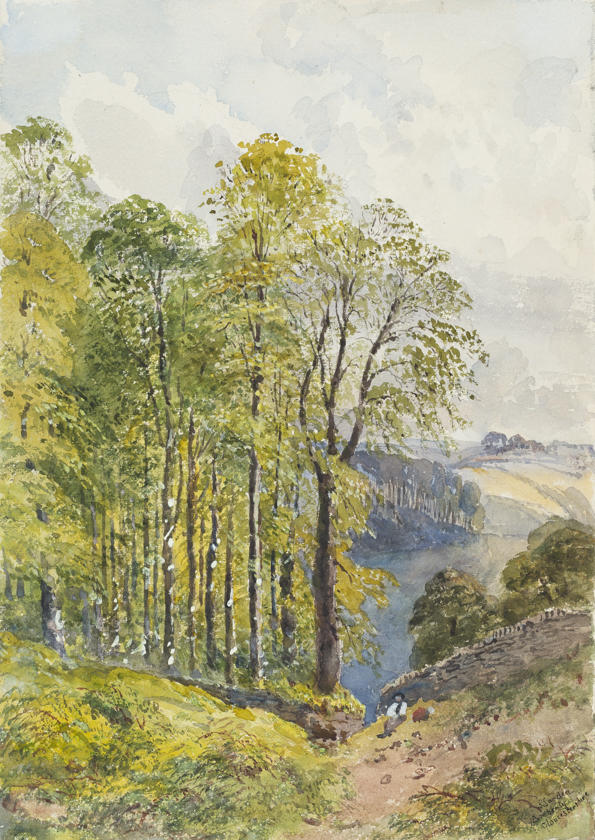

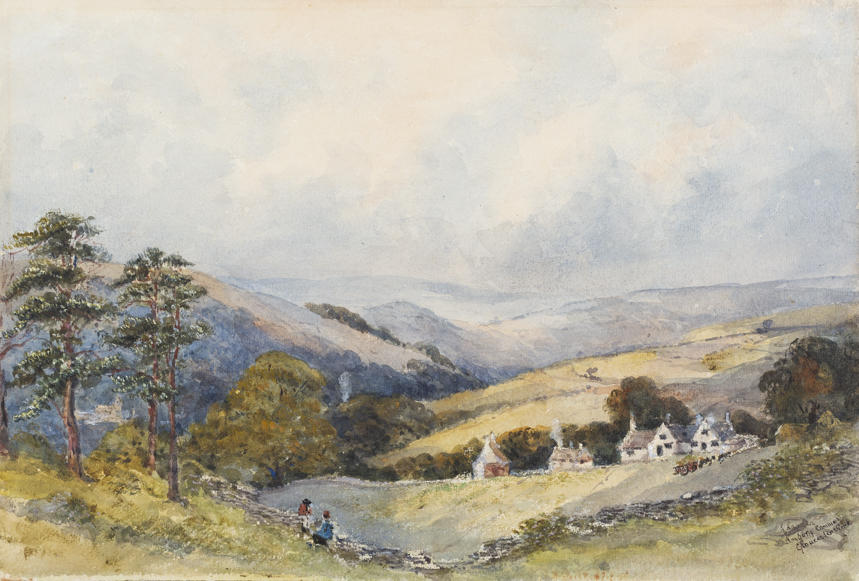

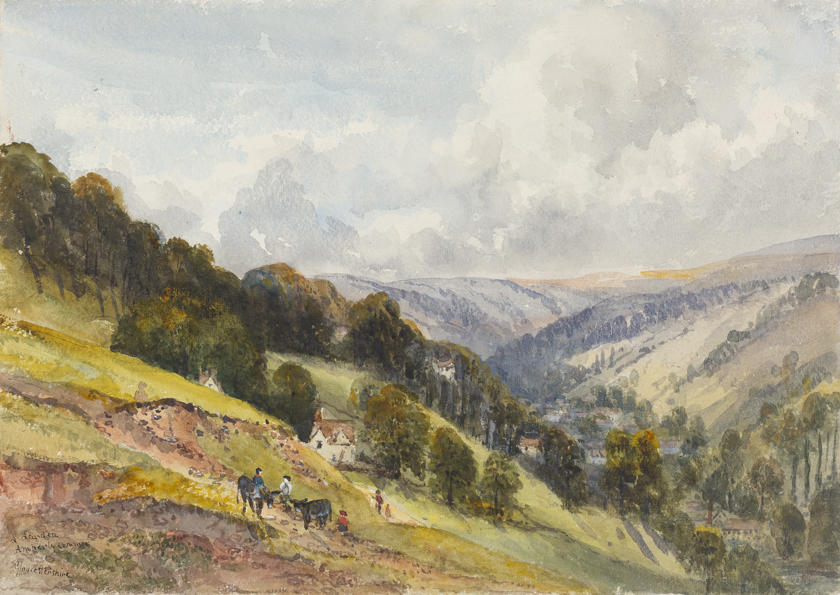

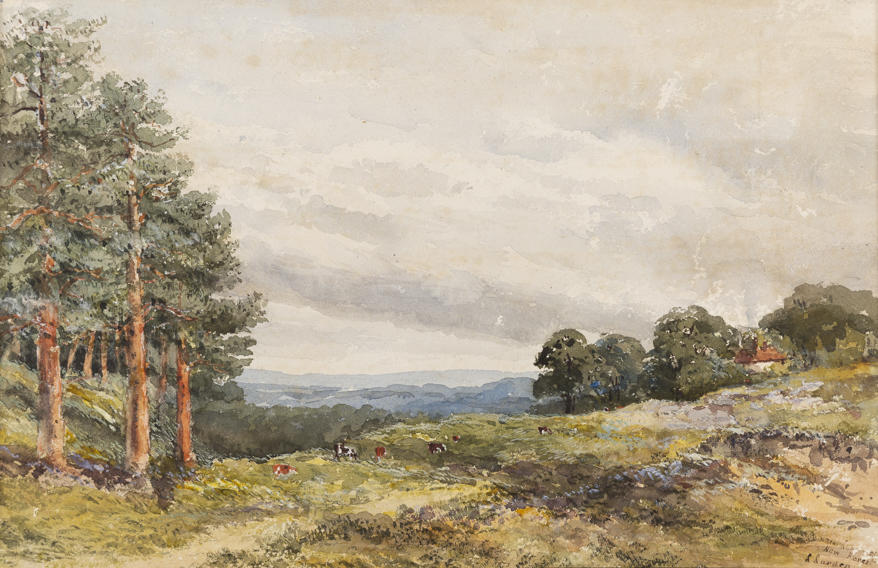

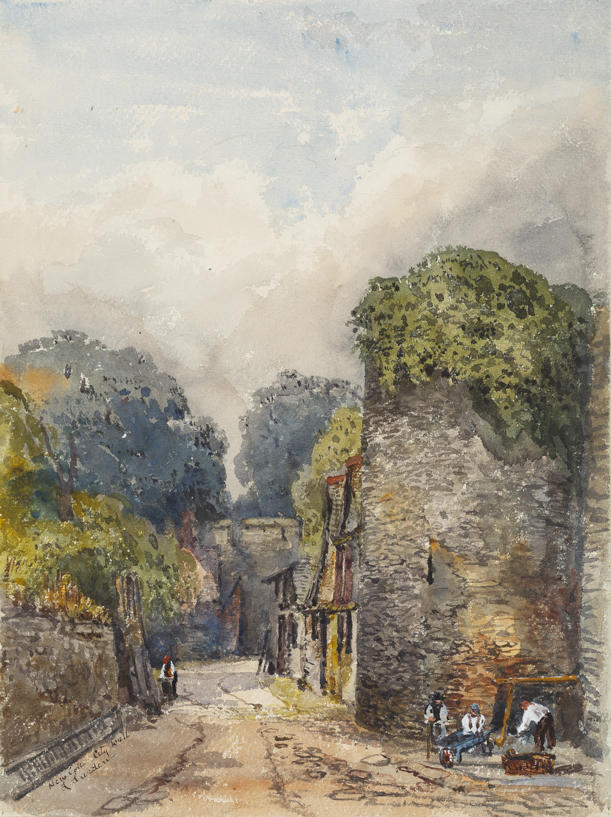

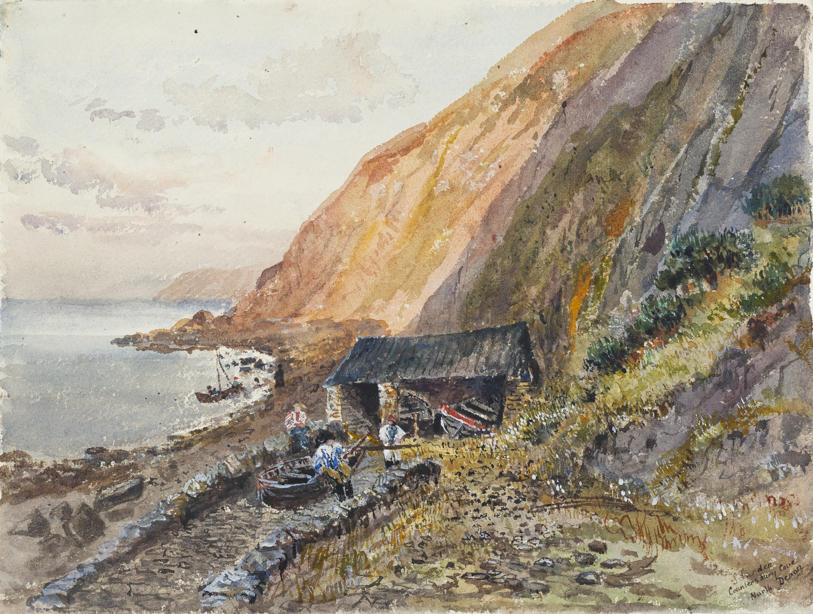

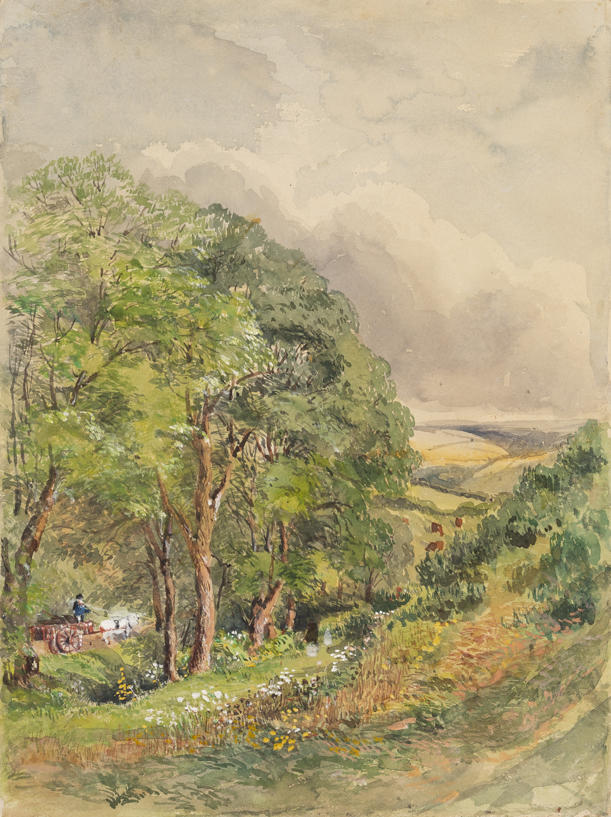

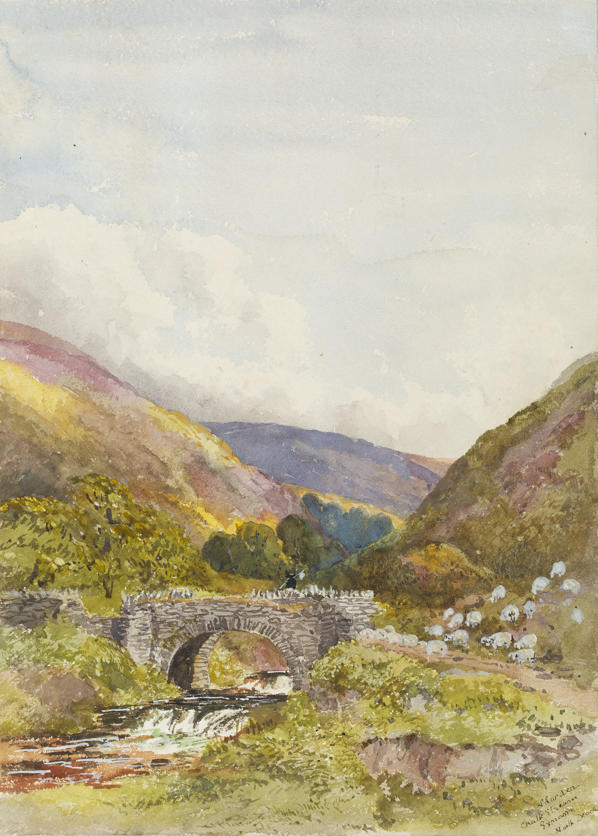

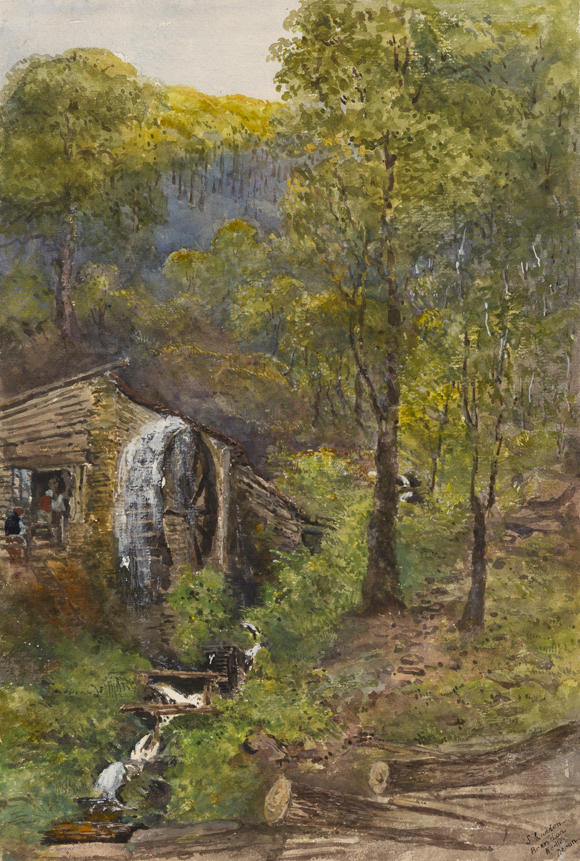

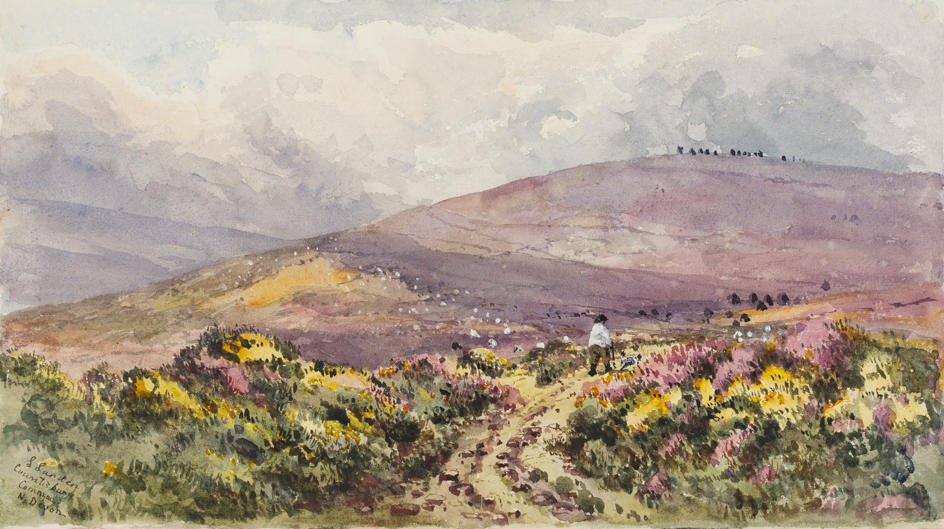

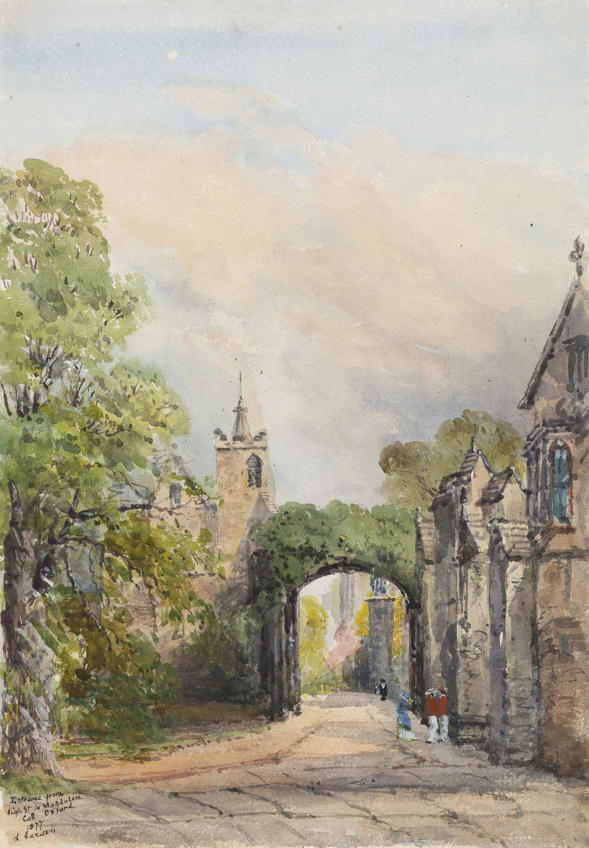
