= Percy Reginald Dix =

Tea merchant, vaudeville company manager (1866–1917)

Percy Reginald Dix (17 November 1866 – 13 March 1917) was a New Zealand tea merchant and vaudeville company manager. He was born in Launceston, Tasmania, Australia on 17 November 1866.
