= William Henry Hosking =

William Henry Hosking LM, LSA, LRCPI, LRCP, MRCS (26 December 1841–11 March 1917) was a New Zealand medical doctor, hospital superintendent, X-ray and radium pioneer.

== Life ==
Hosking was born in 1841 at Redruth, Cornwall, England, and christened in 1844 at Crowan, Cornwall, England. He was the son of William Hosking, an ironfounder and his wife Elizabeth Phillips. Hosking died of leukemia in 1917 at Masterton.

== Education ==
Hosking was educated at schools in Falmouth and Taunton, then studied and trained at the Charing Cross Hospital Medical School. He achieved several qualifications that included LSA Licentiate of the Society of Apothecaries, London 1863; LRCPI Licentiate of the Royal College of Physicians in Ireland, 1873; LRCP Licentiate of the Royal College of Physicians, London; MRCS Member of the Royal College of Surgeons, England 1873; LM Doctor of Laws, University of Liverpool 1874.

He registered under the Medical Practitioners Ordinance of the Province of New Munster in Campbelltown on 19 September 1863. Hosking registered on 23 September 1869 under the Medical Practitioners Act of 1867 at Ross and Masterton.

== New Zealand ==
On 1 May 1863, Hosking departed the United Kingdom bound for the New Munster Province of New South Wales, what is known today as New Zealand. He sailed aboard the SS New Great Britain and arrived in Bluff on 28 September 1863 with smallpox on board. On 14 August 1863, the ship under the leadership of Captain Trader, arrived at Port Chalmers and landed at Bluff on 28 September 1863, as the ship was held offshore while the ship's crew and 170 passengers were held in quarantine as a result of the smallpox outbreak. Most of the passengers were bound for the gold rush at Otago.

== X-ray pioneer ==
Shortly after news of Röntgen's discovery of X-rays being reported in the newspapers, Walter Drowley Filmer produced the first X-ray in an Australian hospital. In 1896, the first six-inch induction coil was imported into New Zealand by Hosking at Masterton. Hosking likely produced X-rays within 12 months of Röntgen's discovery.

== Honours ==
In 1910, Hosking had public baths built in Masterton known as the Christina and Alice Hosking Baths (locally known as the C and A baths). The baths were named in honor of his wife and daughter. The baths measured 75 feet long and 40 feet wide with changing rooms. The earthquake of 1942 damaged the baths beyond use. In 1967, the superintendent of parks, Colin Pugh agreed to have sunken gardens built on the foundation for the pool. The Hosking Garden was opened by his daughter Miss Christina Hosking.
