= William Beehan =

New Zealand politician

William Beehan (1853 – 27 October 1917) was a member of the New Zealand Legislative Council from 22 June 1903 to 21 June 1910; and then 22 June 1910 – 21 June 1917 when his term ended. He was appointed by the Liberal Government.

He was from Auckland.
