= Elise Kemp =

New Zealand-born nurse (1881–1917)

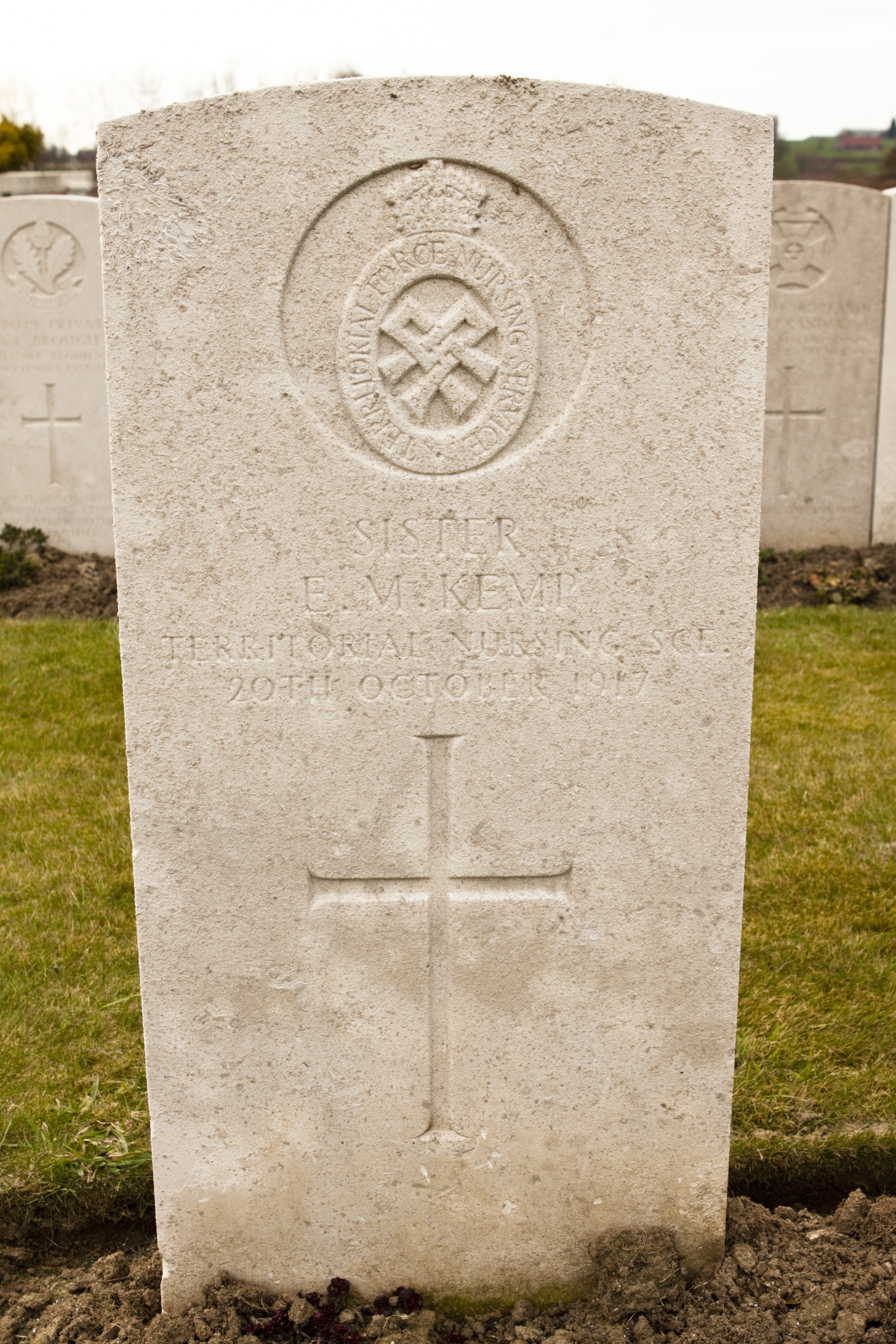
Headstone of Elise Kemp at Godewaersvelde British Cemetery

Elise Margaret Kemp (19 June 1881 – 20 October 1917) was a New Zealand-born nurse who served in the Territorial Forces Nursing Service. She was the only New Zealand-born nurse killed in action on the Western Front during the First World War.

== Early years ==
Kemp was born in Wellington, New Zealand, on 19 June 1881 (some sources erroneously cite 1882), one of six children born to Dr. William George Kemp, a physician and surgeon, and his wife, Charlotte (née Greenwood). Kemp's father was from England and her mother from Nelson, New Zealand. By 1901 the family had relocated to London, living in West Dulwich. Kemp attended the Church High School in Streatham followed by a finishing school in Brussels.

Kemp began studying nursing in 1904 at King's College Hospital. She graduated on 12 February 1908, and began working as a Ward Sister. In 1914 she became a member of the London-based Territorial Forces Nursing Service (TFNS). In January 1916 she was posted to the Western Front.

== Death ==
On 20 October 1917, Kemp was treating casualties at a clearing station in Flanders when it was bombed by a German aircraft. Kemp, three orderlies and three patients were killed. The Matron-in-Chief made the following entry in the unit's war diary: "Went on to Godwaersvelde to 37 C.C.S. where I saw the O.C. and learnt the particulars of the very trying incident of the night before. Fortunately they had just evacuated and they had only 30 patients in hospital, or the casualties would have been very great. There had been no warning at all beforehand and the bombs landed close to a marquee where the sister, 3 orderlies and 3 patients were killed and other were wounded, two of whom lost their arms."

On 3 November 1917, the British Journal of Nursing recorded Kemp's death as follows:

OUR ROLL OF HONOUR. "Great sorrow has been caused at King's College Hospital, Denmark Hill, by the news of the death of Sister Elise M. Kemp, of the Territorial Force Nursing Service. Sister Kemp, who was trained at King's College Hospital, and afterwards promoted to the position of Sister, was a great favourite with her colleagues, both at home and abroad. At the time of her death she was working at a Casualty Clearing Station in France, where she was killed instantaneously by the explosion of a bomb. We offer our sincere sympathy to her parents, Dr. and Mrs. Kemp, of Hastings, in their bereavement."

== Memorials ==
Kemp is interred in the British Cemetery just outside Godewaersvelde, France. There is a memorial tablet to her in the chapel at Kings College Hospital.
