= Alexander Bruce (politician) =

New Zealand engineer, trade unionist, goldminer (?–1917)

Alexander Bruce (c. 1839 – 14 July 1917) was a New Zealand engineer, trade unionist, baker, gold miner and local politician. He was born in Aberdeen, Aberdeenshire, Scotland.
