= Stoneycroft House =

Stoneycroft
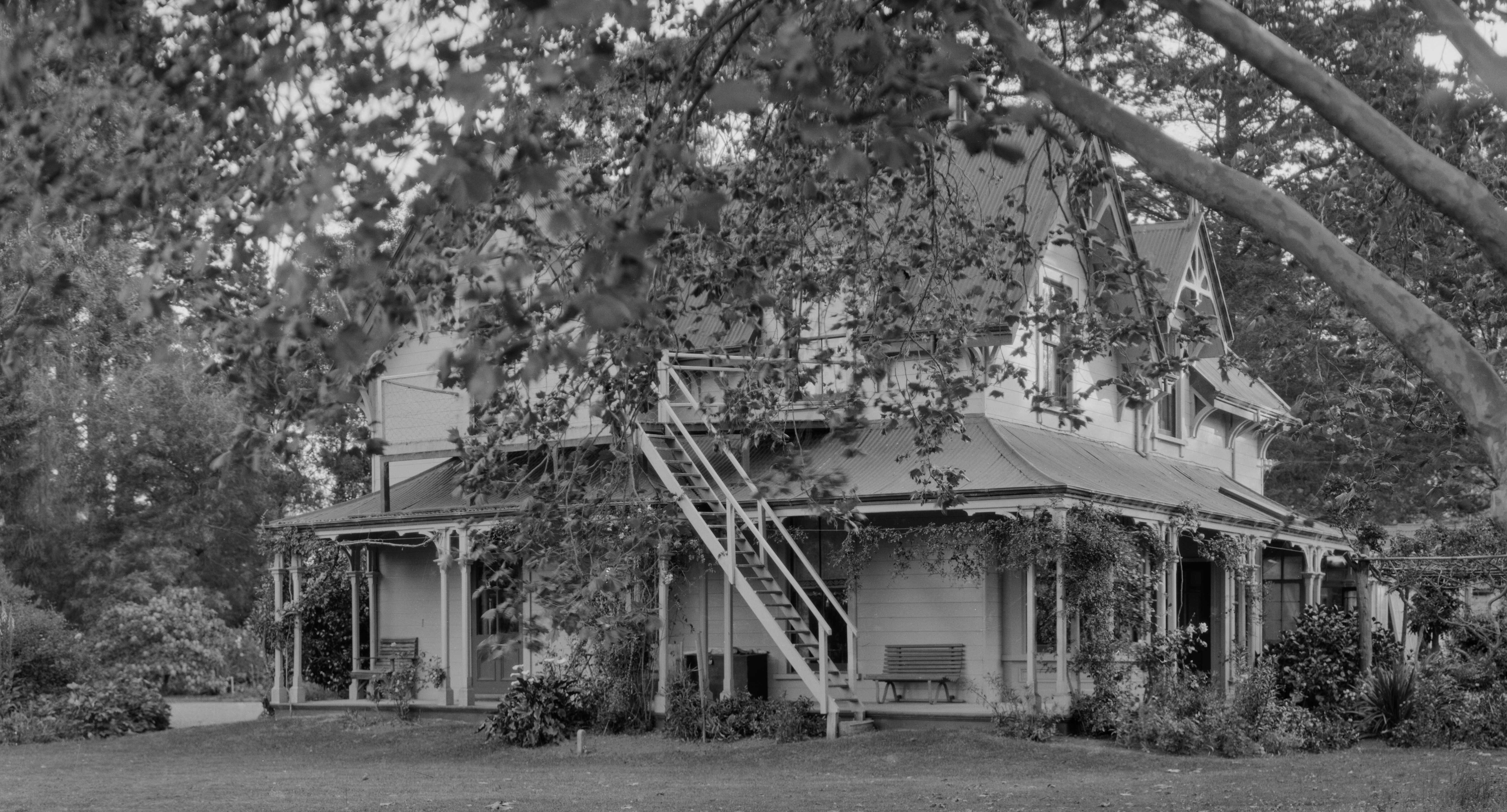
- Stoneycroft 1923–1928

General information
- Type: Townhouse
- Architectural style: Gothic Revival
- Location: Stoneycroft Reserve, 901 Omahu Road and Hastings Napier Expressway, Hastings, New Zealand
- Coordinates: 39°37′14″S 176°49′05″E
- Year built: 1877 or 1878
- Owner: Hastings District Council

Heritage New Zealand – Category 2
- Designated: 7 April 1983
- Reference no.: 1102

Stoneycroft is a historic timber Gothic villa in Hastings, New Zealand. Constructed in the late 1870s as a townhouse for a Pātea runholder, Stoneycroft passed through several owners before being donated to the Hastings District Council in 2005. Stoneycroft is one of the oldest homes in Hastings and has had very little alteration since construction, resulting in it being registered as a category 2 building with Heritage New Zealand.

== Description ==
Stoneycroft is situated at the corner of the Hawke's Bay Expressway (SH2) and Omahu Road. It is a two-storey Gothic timber villa. It has two verandahs, a gable roof, dormer windows with ornate timber-work. Stoneycroft has remained largely unmodified since construction.

The position of Stoneycroft aty an entrance point to Hastings results it in being a landmark and guide for those travelling to the town.

Stoneycroft was initially part of a 49 acres (20 ha) section but the property was subdivided overtime and the property now occupies just 2.4 ha (5.9 acres).

== History ==
Stoneycroft was constructed in either 1877 or early 1878 by William Birch and brother Azim as a townhouse. The Birch brothers were runholders in Pātea as well as local councillors. In February 1884 the property was listed for sale and in August it had sold to Nathaniel Beamish. The Birch brothers had moved to Pātea. The Beamish family retained the property until 1954 when Diamond Allan Ballentyne purchased it. In 1967 Ballantyne attempted to gift the property to the New Zealand Historic Places Trust but this did not eventuate; however, in 1995 the property received a heritage convent and in 2005 it was purchased by the Hastings District Council. In 2011 a volunteer restoration began and the building reopened 1 December 2012. Stoneycroft has since 2009 been occupied by the Hawkes Bay Knowledge Bank, a volunteer organisation digitising historical records relating to the Hawkes Bay.
