= Nora Mary Crawford =

New Zealand policewoman

Nora Mary Crawford (née Parker, 25 June 1917 – 1 January 1997) was a New Zealand policewoman. She was born in Hāwera, Taranaki, New Zealand on 25 June 1917. She was the first woman to reach the rank of Detective in the New Zealand Police.
