= Arthur Perry (cricketer) =

New Zealand cricketer

Personal information
- Born: 11 February 1840; Hobart, Australia
- Died: 21 April 1898 (aged 58); Timaru, New Zealand
- Source: Cricinfo, 20 October 2020

Arthur Perry (11 February 1840 – 21 April 1898) was a New Zealand cricketer. He played in one first-class match for Canterbury in 1877/78.

== See also ==
- List of Canterbury representative cricketers
