= George Wilson (New Zealand cricketer) =

New Zealand cricketer (1887–1917)

Personal information
- Full name: George Charles Lee Wilson
- Born: 1 May 1887; Christchurch, New Zealand
- Died: 14 December 1917 (aged 30); Ypres salient, Belgium
- Bowling: Right-arm leg-spin and googly

International information
- National side: New Zealand

Domestic team information
- Years: Team
- 1913-14: Canterbury

Career statistics
Competition	First-class
Matches	6
Runs scored	186
Batting average	31.00
100s/50s	0/1
Top score	64 not out
Balls bowled	1379
Wickets	31
Bowling average	23.12
5 wickets in innings	4
10 wickets in match	2
Best bowling	7/80
Catches/stumpings	1/–
- Source: Cricinfo, 18 September 2014

George Charles Lee Wilson (1 May 1887 – 14 December 1917) was a New Zealand cricketer who played first-class cricket for Canterbury in the 1913-14 season and died in World War I.

== Club career ==
A short, slightly-built right-arm leg-break and googly bowler who usually opened the bowling, and a useful lower-order batsman, George Wilson played for the Sydenham club in the Canterbury Cricket Association. When they won the championship for the first time in 1912-13, he took 57 wickets at an average of 11.96. In 1913-14, when they retained the title, he took 53 wickets at 9.62. He worked in Christchurch as a joiner.

== The 1913–14 season ==
Wilson made his first-class debut on Christmas Day 1913 for Canterbury against Otago at Lancaster Park in Christchurch. Canterbury were the holders of the Plunket Shield, and in the system as it operated at the time, had to defend the title against challengers. Wilson took two wickets in the match, which Canterbury won by six wickets. In the next match, against Wellington, Wilson took 4 for 76 and 7 for 80 in another Canterbury victory, this time by 243 runs. The third match was against Auckland. Batting at number ten in the first innings and nine in the second, Wilson made 34 not out and 64 not out, and took 5 for 73 and 6 for 117. For the final Plunket Shield match of the season Canterbury travelled south to Dunedin to play Otago again. Before the match they played a two-day match in Invercargill against Southland, in which Wilson took 8 for 56 and 5 for 41. Against Otago he took 5 for 95 and 2 for 88 in an innings victory for Canterbury. Wilson was the outstanding bowler in the Plunket Shield season, with 31 wickets at an average of 18.77.

He played two matches against the Australian team that toured New Zealand at the end of the season, but without taking a wicket in either match. The first match was between Canterbury and the Australians, when Victor Trumper and Arthur Sims added 433 runs for the eighth wicket in 190 minutes, a world record for the eighth wicket that still stands. Wilson did not open the bowling this time, and took no wicket for 95 off 19 overs. Trumper hit one of his deliveries "into the frog pond on the back ground, the biggest hit of the match". The Australians then played two matches against New Zealand. Wilson played in the first, but bowled only eight overs for 39 runs, and Australia won by seven wickets. He was one of seven players who lost their place in the team for the second match, which Australia won by an innings.

== Death in World War I ==
Wilson served as a private with the Canterbury Infantry Regiment in World War I. He was killed in action at the Ypres salient on 14 December 1917.
