= Purakau Maika =

Pūrākau Maika
- Born: 1851 or 1852; New Zealand
- Died: 4 August 1917; Hurunuiorangi Pā, Gladstone, New Zealand
- Occupations: Newspaper editor, publisher
- Known for: Māori journalism and publishing

Purakau Maika (1851 or 1852 – 4 August 1917) was a New Zealand newspaper editor and publisher. Of Māori descent, he identified with the Ngāti Kahungunu and Rangitāne iwi. He was born in New Zealand in about 1852, and died at Hurunuiorangi Pā, Gladstone, on 4 August 1917.
