= Robert Thompson Batley =

New Zealand seaman, farm worker, storekeeper and sheep farmer

Robert Thompson Batley (15 November 1849 – 14 July 1917) was a New Zealand seaman, farm worker, storekeeper and sheep farmer. He was born in Great Yarmouth, Norfolk, England on 15 November 1849.
