= John Graham Gow =

Commercial traveler and government trade representative

John Graham Gow (5 May 1850 – 17 February 1917) was a New Zealand commercial traveller and government trade representative. He was born in Crieff, Perthshire, Scotland on 5 May 1850.
