= William John Birch =

English Writer

William John Birch (1811–1891) was an English rationalist writer.

== Background and early life ==
He was the son of Jonathan Birch (died 1848, at age 76) of St Pancras, London, and his wife Mary Elizabeth Morrice (died 1822), daughter of William Morrice. His family background was largely clerical. Jonathan Birch had been an East India Company ship captain, making a number of voyages. A brother and two sisters of William John died young.

Jonathan Birch resided in Gower Street, London, and at Pudlicote House, near Shorthampton in Oxfordshire, built in 1810, which he purchased in 1822. He died at Alford, Lincolnshire, in 1848. After his death, his brother George made a case on the interpretation of his will of 1845 in the Prerogative Court of Canterbury.

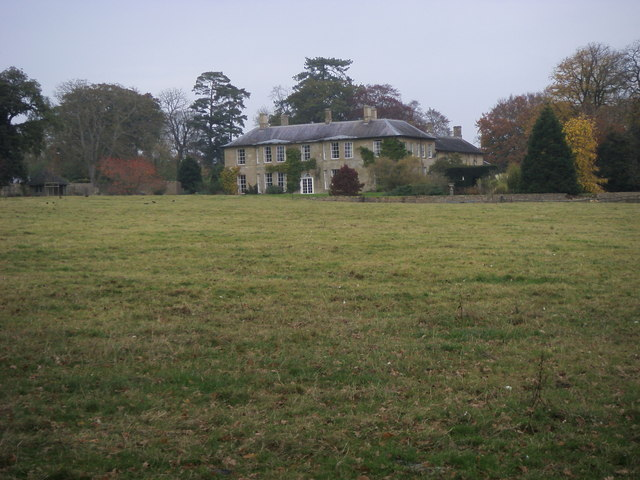
Pudlicote House, 2009 photograph

William John Birch was educated at Balliol College, Oxford and New Inn Hall, graduating B.A. in 1832, M.A. 1835. He entered Lincoln's Inn in 1832 and was called to the bar in 1841. He did not practise the law.

In 1840 Birch was an Owenite lecturer in Manchester. Pudlicote House descended to him in 1848. He was involved as an organiser in the National Parliamentary and Financial Reform Association of the late 1840s, with Edward Miall, Thomas James Serle and others.

== Freethought activist ==
Birch was a significant funder of freethought. With William Henry Ashurst, he was a major backer of the Anti-Persecution Union set up in 1842 by George Holyoake and Emma Martin, and also of the Theological Utilitarians. He supported The Plebeian, founded in 1844 by Matilda Roalfe and William Baker. He supported also "The Library of Reason", the penny pamphlet series sponsored by Henry Hetherington. When in 1845 Holyoake was seriously ill, and under financial strain with the Movement, his publication, Birch with others found him in London after he returned from a period in Leicester with Josiah Gimson, and saw him back to health. Birch contributed to the Movement, as did Sophia Dobson Collet, and others grouped as "middle-class freethinkers" (George Gwynne, Arthur Trevelyan).

Birch became interested in Auguste Comte and positivism. From 1850 he gave weekly support to The Reasoner, the founding secularist organ of George Holyoake from 1846. At this period he met George Eliot. Holyoake introduced him to Robert Owen, in company with Michael Foster and Percy Greg; and dedicated to him his The History of the Last Trial by Jury for Atheism in England (1850). According to Annie Besant, Birch frequented the house of Thomas Scott (1808–1878), the freethinker.

In December 1851, when secularism was a neologism, the Secular Society held a Free Discussion Festival, at which Holyoake was the main speaker; Birch was in the chair. That year John Chapman took over The Westminster Review, the quarterly journal of the radicals, and Birch gave it financial support.

Birch was a close friend of John Allen Giles; Giles recorded riding north from Bampton through Wychwood to Pudlicote on 26 March 1852. At this period Giles was planning a biblical commentary to be written with Thomas Wilson, a Cambridge graduate who had left the Church of England in 1847: working title the "Bampton Bible". Samuel Wilberforce, Giles's diocesan bishop, had got wind of the project. Birch advised Giles to leave the editorship of the project to Wilson. Giles's name was still associated with Wilson's work that appeared the following year.

== Later life ==
According to an 1895 article in The Freethinker by "J.M.W." (Joseph Mazzini Wheeler), Birch had a "large fortune" but lost most of it. After university, he had invested in Cornish mines, choosing that course rather than entering politics. His financial position was hard hit when the industry slumped in the middle of the century. In May 1853 John Allen Giles attended a shareholders' meeting for a mine, on behalf of Birch. He concluded that Birch was the only investor likely to put in the additional money required to make it viable.

In 1853 Birch was on the London management committee of the Upper Canada Mining Company. He gave land in Canada to Holyoake, for a freethought settlement, which Holyoake later returned.

Birch was one of Giles's bail sureties at the time of his being charged with offences related to a marriage ceremony carried out in 1854. When Giles wrote to Birch with the bad news that the Cornish mine would require a "thumping call" to continue, in May 1855, it was from Oxford Castle where he was imprisoned. The following year, Birch bought the advowson of Draycot Foliat, with the intention of nominating Giles to the living. But Samuel Wilberforce, by refusing to counter-sign the documents, brought the plan to nothing.

On 27 September 1856 Birch and his wife Margaret Fanny gave a farewell dinner at 21 Henrietta Street, London, attended by John Allen Giles, before they set off on a voyage to the USA. She died in Philadelphia, on 11 January 1857. The circumstances, as related to Giles in a letter from Frances May Eddy, a cousin of Birch, involved a pharmacy mistake of black drop, based on opium, for black draught based on senna. Birch put his Oxfordshire estate on the market for sale in 1858.

Birch spent many winters in Florence, where he was on good terms with Walter Savage Landor. He was a supporter of the Mazzinians. Ultimately Birch moved to Florence, living there with his daughter Pauline. His Italian literary friends there included Angelo de Gubernatis and Giuseppe Ricciardi.

Birch died in 1891 in Florence. He left a portrait to Wheeler, and when he moved to Italy his manuscripts.

== Works ==
Birch published:

- The Real and the Ideal: Or, Illustrations of Travel (1840), anonymous.
- An Inquiry into the Philosophy and Religion of Shakespeare (1848); it argued that Hamlet was a sceptic. Birch extended his reasoning to Shakespeare himself. Edward Dowden criticised Birch's method as trying to show Shakespeare was an atheist through short proof texts.
- Paul an Idea, Not a Fact (1855), anonymous
- An Inquiry into the Philosophy and Religion of the Bible (1856), translated into Dutch by "Rudolf Charles" (Rudolf Charles d'Ablaing van Giessenburg).
- The Jesus Christ of John Stuart Mill (1870), under the pseudonym "Antichrist", published by Edward Truelove.
- Bible Bestiality, and Filth from the Fathers (1888) as "Aulus Cornelius Celsus"
- Will Shakespeare, Tom Paine, Bob Ingersoll and Charlie Bradlaugh (1890), on diminutive names.

He edited with Maltus Questell Ryall the 1843 defence The Man Paterson of Thomas Paterson, the printer and editor of The Oracle of Reason.

Birch was a prolific contributor to Notes & Queries. In 1882 a series of articles under his name in the National Reformer, entitled "The Christ of Dr. Aveling" referring to Birch's correspondent Edward Aveling, was made the subject of a parliamentary question by Henry Tyler. Tyler called on Sir William Harcourt, the Home Secretary, to look into a prosecution for blasphemy.

== Family ==
Birch was married, to Margaret Fanny (surname not available). She was born in Dublin, and was aged 38 in 1851. They had four children. There were two sons:–

- Azim (1837–1923), born in Syria, middle name given as Salvatore, Salvator or Salvador, ran with his younger brother for a period a New Zealand sheep farm of 115,000 acres (47,000 ha). He was married in 1878 at St Stephen, Kensington, London to Dora Davison.
- William John Birch the younger, born 1842, emigrated to New Zealand and became a pioneer sheep farmer in Rangitikei. He married in 1875 at Hathern, Leicestershire, Ethel Larden, youngest daughter of the late Rev. George Edge Larden. Her mother Mary Lydia Fanny Bucknill (died 1901) married Larden in 1847. Ethel — forenames Lydia Etheldreda — is known as an artist as Lydia Larden.

The brothers built the Birch Homestead together in 1868, and divided their sheep station in 1897. Azim retired and sold out to Thomas Lowry and Edward Watt. He returned to England. William retired to Marton, and died in 1920.

Antonio Caccia (1801–1867) from Milan was a political exile. He was in England in the late 1820s and married in 1829 (Martha) Sabina Lamb, daughter of the Member of Parliament Thomas Phillipps Lamb (died 1819). They had two sons, Mario and Fabio, named in a monumental inscription reproduced in Caccia's biography. These sons married the two daughters of William and Margaret Birch, Pauline and Clara.

Fabio Caccia, the younger son, middle name given as Guiliano or Juliano or Julian, married Pauline Birch, the elder daughter. Their son William Charles Birch Caccia went to New Zealand in 1884, and in 1897 took over the portion part of the sheep station owned by his uncle William John Birch, who had no heirs and adopted him. He had changed his surname to Caccia-Birch by deed poll in 1891. Caccia Birch House is named for him and his wife Maud.

Azim was the maternal grandfather of Harold Caccia, Baron Caccia. Lord Caccia's father, Anthony Mario Felix Caccia, was another son of Pauline. The "youngest son of Mr. F. G. Caccia of Florence", he married Fanny Theodora Birch in 1901.

Clara Arabella Caccia née Birch died on 2 August 1875. Her 1869 marriage was recorded as "At Florence, Cavalier Mario Caccia Major in the Italian Army, to Clara A., daughter of Mr. W. I. Birch, Dec. 27."
