= Matilda Roalfe =

British author, bookshop owner and publisher

- Born: 1813
- Died: 1880 (aged 66–67)
- Other name: Matilda Sanderson
- Occupations: Bookseller and publisher
- Criminal charges: Blasphemy and selling prohibited books
- Spouse: Walter Sanderson
- Children: 2

Matilda Roalfe (1813–1880) was a British writer, bookseller, and publisher. She was a friend of fellow feminist freethinker Emma Martin (1812-1851)

== Bookshop and Publishing Company ==
Roalfe moved from London to Edinburgh to run a bookshop, The Atheistical Depot, and publishing company Matilda Roalfe & Company, at 105 Nicolson Street. The previous owner of the shop had been imprisoned. Upon opening, she issued a circular proclaiming "I neither hope nor fear anything from authority, and am resolved to supply the public with works of a controversial and philosophical character, whether such works do or do not bring into contempt the Holy Scriptures and the Christian religion."

== Author ==
Together with Charles Southwell, she wrote I am a Christian (1839).

She wrote and published Law breaking justified (1844), a 16-page booklet on the subject of blasphemy.

Together with Thomas Paterson and Thomas Finlay, she wrote "The Trial of Thomas Paterson, for Blasphemy, Before the High Court of Justiciary, Edinburgh, with the Whole of His Bold and Effective Defence. Also, the Trials of Thomas Finlay and Miss Matilda Roalfe (for Blasphemy), in the Sheriffs' Court. With Notes and a Special Dissertation on Blasphemy Prosecution in General, by the Secretary of the Anti-Persecution Union", published by Henry Hetherington, London and Edinburgh (1844)

Roalfe began a magazine in 1844 called "The Plebian" with William Baker.

== Imprisonment ==
Roalfe was a prisoner in Calton Jail, Edinburgh, following her trial for the publication and sale of prohibited Freethought works, "The Age of Reason" and "The Oracle of Reason." The trial took place in the Sheriff's Court on Tuesday January 23, 1844. During the trial, Roalfe was told that if she pleaded that she was unaware of the nature of the books then she would escape with a shorter sentence; she refused to do so. Roalfe pleaded not guilty claiming that she did not sell the books with a "wicked and felonious intent." She was sentenced to imprisonment for sixty days.

== Personal life ==
She married Walter Sanderson and lived in Galashiels. They had two daughters.
