= Chilson =

Hamlet in Oxfordshire, England

Coordinates: 51.873°N 1.536°W

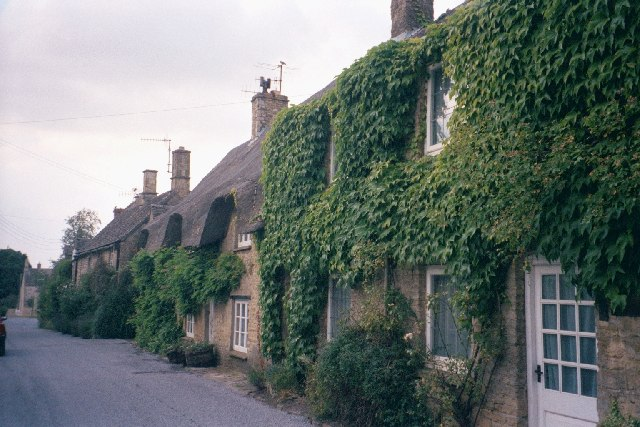
- Cottages in Chilson

- Location within Oxfordshire
- Population: 141 (parish, including Shorthampton) (2011 Census)
- OS grid reference: SP3119
- Civil parish: Chilson
- District: West Oxfordshire
- Shire county: Oxfordshire
- Region: South East
- Country: England
- Sovereign state: United Kingdom
- Post town: Chipping Norton
- Postcode district: OX7
- Police: Thames Valley
- Fire: Oxfordshire
- Ambulance: South Central
- UK Parliament: Banbury

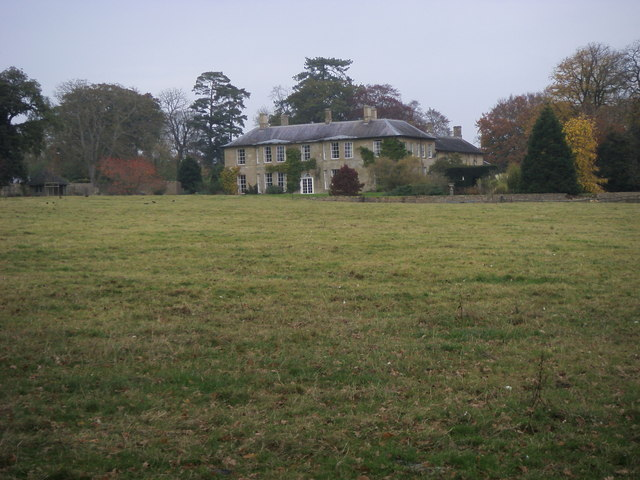
Pudlicote House

Chilson is a hamlet and civil parish in the Evenlode Valley in West Oxfordshire, England, about 4 1/2 miles (7 km) south of Chipping Norton. The civil parish also includes the hamlet of Shorthampton, about 2/5 mile (1 km) north east of Chilson. The 2011 Census recorded the parish's population as 141. The toponym, first recorded as Cildestuna in about 1200, is derived from the Old English ċildes tūn, meaning "estate of the young nobleman".

A Heritage Grade II-listed country house, Pudlicote House, lies one kilometre to the north of Chilson. Built around 1808, it was for a time the residence of Jonathan Birch and later his son William John Birch.
