= Transmutation of species =

18th and 19th-century evolutionary ideas

The Transmutation of species and transformism are 18th and early 19th-century ideas about the change of one species into another that preceded Charles Darwin's theory of evolution through natural selection. The French Transformisme was a term used by Jean Baptiste Lamarck in 1809 for his theory, and other 18th and 19th century proponents of pre-Darwinian evolutionary ideas included Denis Diderot, Étienne Geoffroy Saint-Hilaire, Erasmus Darwin, Robert Grant, and Robert Chambers, the anonymous author of the 1844 book Vestiges of the Natural History of Creation. Such ideas were associated with 18th century ideas of Deism and human progress. Opposition in the scientific community to these early theories of evolution, led by influential scientists like the anatomists Georges Cuvier and Richard Owen, and the geologist Charles Lyell, was intense. The debate over them was an important stage in the history of evolutionary thought and influenced the subsequent reaction to Darwin's theory.

== Terminology ==
Transmutation was one of the names commonly used for evolutionary ideas in the 19th century before Charles Darwin published On The Origin of Species (1859). Transmutation had previously been used as a term in alchemy to describe the transformation of base metals into gold. Other names for evolutionary ideas used in this period include the development hypothesis (one of the terms used by Darwin) and the theory of regular gradation, used by William Chilton in the periodical press such as The Oracle of Reason. Transformation is another word used quite as often as transmutation in this context. These early 19th century evolutionary ideas played an important role in the history of evolutionary thought.

The proto-evolutionary thinkers of the 18th and early 19th century had to invent terms to label their ideas, but it was first Joseph Gottlieb Kölreuter who used the term "transmutation" to refer to species who have had biological changes through hybridization.

The terminology did not settle down until some time after the publication of the Origin of Species. The word evolved in a modern sense was first used in 1826 in an anonymous paper published in Robert Jameson's journal and evolution was a relative late-comer which can be seen in Herbert Spencer's Social Statics of 1851, (Note: There are three examples of the word 'evolution' in Social Statics, but none in the sense that is used today in biology.) and at least one earlier example, but was not in general use until about 1865–1870.

== Historical development ==
=== Ideas before the 18th century ===
In the 10th and 11th centuries, Ibn Miskawayh's Al-Fawz al-Kabir (الفوز الأكبر), and the Brethren of Purity's Encyclopedia of the Brethren of Purity (رسائل إخوان الصفا) developed ideas about changes in biological species. In 1993, Muhammad Hamidullah described the ideas in lectures:

[These books] state that God first created matter and invested it with energy for development. Matter, therefore, adopted the form of vapour which assumed the shape of water in due time. The next stage of development was mineral life. Different kinds of stones developed [over the] course of [time, their] highest form being mirjan (coral). It is a stone which has in it branches like those of a tree. After mineral life evolves vegetation. The evolution of vegetation culminates with a tree which bears the qualities of an animal. This is the date-palm. It has male and female genders. It does not wither if all its branches are chopped but it dies when the head is cut off. The date-palm is therefore considered the highest among the trees and resembles the lowest among animals. Then is born the lowest of animals. It evolves into an ape. This is not the statement of Darwin. This is what Ibn Maskawayh states and this is precisely what is written in the Epistles of Ikhwan al-Safa. The Muslim thinkers state that ape then evolved into a lower kind of a barbarian man. He then became a superior human being. Man becomes a saint, a prophet. He evolves into a higher stage and becomes an angel. The one higher to angels is indeed none but God. Everything begins from Him and everything returns to Him.

In the 14th century, Ibn Khaldun further developed these ideas. According to some commentators, statements in his 1377 work, the Muqaddimah anticipate the biological theory of evolution.

Robert Hooke proposed in a speech to the Royal Society in the late 17th century that species vary, change, and especially become extinct. His “Discourse of Earthquakes” was based on comparisons made between fossils, especially the modern pearly nautilus and the curled shells of ammonites.

=== 18th and early 19th century ===
In the 18th century, Jacques-Antoine des Bureaux claimed a "genealogical ascent of species". He argued that through crossbreeding and hybridization in reproduction, "progressive organization" occurred, allowing organisms to change and more complex species to develop.

Simultaneously, Retif de la Bretonne wrote La decouverte australe par un homme-volant (1781) and La philosophie de monsieur Nicolas (1796), which encapsulated his view that more complex species, such as mankind, had developed step-by-step from "less perfect" animals. De la Bretonne believed that living forms undergo constant change. Although he believed in constant change, he took a very different approach from Diderot: chance and blind combinations of atoms, in de la Bretonne's opinion, were not the cause of transmutation. De la Bretonne argued that all species had developed from more primitive organisms, and that nature aimed to reach perfection.

Denis Diderot, chief editor of the Encyclopédie, spent his time poring over scientific theories attempting to explain rock strata and the diversity of fossils. Geological and fossil evidence was presented to him as contributions to Encyclopedia articles, chief among them "Mammoth", "Fossil", and "Ivory Fossil", all of which noted the existence of mammoth bones in Siberia. As a result of this geological and fossil evidence, Diderot believed that species were mutable. Particularly, he argued that organisms metamorphosized over millennia, resulting in species changes. In Diderot's theory of transformationism, random chance plays a large role in allowing species to change, develop and become extinct, as well as having new species form. Specifically, Diderot believed that given randomness and an infinite number of times, all possible scenarios would manifest themselves. He proposed that this randomness was behind the development of new traits in offspring and as a result the development and extinction of species.

Diderot drew from Leonardo da Vinci’s comparison of the leg structure of a human and a horse as proof of the interconnectivity of species. He saw this experiment as demonstrating that nature could continually try out new variations. Additionally, Diderot argued that organic molecules and organic matter possessed an inherent consciousness, which allowed the smallest particles of organic matter to organize into fibers, then a network, and then organs. The idea that organic molecules have consciousness was derived from both Maupertuis and Lucretian texts. Overall, Diderot’s musings all fit together as a "composite transformist philosophy", one dependent on the randomness inherent to nature as a transformist mechanism.

==== Erasmus Darwin ====
Erasmus Darwin developed a theory of universal transformation. His major works, The Botanic Garden (1792), Zoonomia (1794–1796), and The Temple of Nature all touched on the transformation of organic creatures. In both The Botanic Garden and The Temple of Nature, Darwin used poetry to describe his ideas regarding species. In Zoonomia, however, Erasmus clearly articulates (as a more scientific text) his beliefs about the connections between organic life. He notes particularly that some plants and animals have "useless appendages", which have gradually changed from their original, useful states. Additionally, Darwin relied on cosmological transformation as a crucial aspect of his theory of transformation, making a connection between William Herschel’s approach to natural historical cosmology and the changing aspects of plants and animals.

Erasmus believed that life had one origin, a common ancestor, which he referred to as the "filament" of life. He used his understanding of chemical transmutation to justify the spontaneous generation of this filament. His geological study of Derbyshire and the sea- shells and fossils which he found there helped him to come to the conclusion that complex life had developed from more primitive forms (Laniel-Musitelli). Erasmus was an early proponent of what we now refer to as "adaptations", albeit through a different transformist mechanism – he argued that sexual reproduction could pass on acquired traits through the father’s contribution to the embryon. These changes, he believed, were mainly driven by the three great needs of life: lust, food, and security. Erasmus proposed that these acquired changes gradually altered the physical makeup of organisms as a result of the desires of plants and animals. Notably, he describes insects developing from plants, a grand example of one species transforming into another.

Erasmus Darwin relied on Lucretian philosophy to form a theory of universal change. He proposed that both organic and inorganic matter changed throughout the course of the universe, and that plants and animals could pass on acquired traits to their progeny. His view of universal transformation placed time as a driving force in the universe’s journey towards improvement. In addition, Erasmus believed that nature had some amount of agency in this inheritance. Darwin spun his own story of how nature began to develop from the ocean, and then slowly became more diverse and more complex. His transmutation theory relied heavily on the needs which drove animal competition, as well as the results of this contest between both animals and plants.

Charles Darwin acknowledged his grandfather’s contribution to the field of transmutation in his synopsis of Erasmus’ life, The Life of Erasmus Darwin. Darwin collaborated with Ernst Krause to write a forward on Krause's Erasmus Darwin und Seine Stellung in Der Geschichte Der Descendenz-Theorie, which translates into Erasmus Darwin and His Place in the History of the Descent Theory. Krause explains Erasmus' motivations for arguing for the theory of descent, including Darwin's connection with and correspondence with Rousseau, which may have influenced how he saw the world.

==== Lamarck ====
Jean-Baptiste Lamarck proposed a hypothesis on the transmutation of species in Philosophie Zoologique (1809). Lamarck did not believe that all living things shared a common ancestor. Rather he believed that simple forms of life were created continuously by spontaneous generation. He also believed that an innate life force, which he sometimes described as a nervous fluid, drove species to become more complex over time, advancing up a linear ladder of complexity that was related to the great chain of being. Lamarck also recognized that species were adapted to their environment. He explained this observation by saying that the same nervous fluid driving increasing complexity, also caused the organs of an animal (or a plant) to change based on the use or disuse of that organ, just as muscles are affected by exercise. He argued that these changes would be inherited by the next generation and produce slow adaptation to the environment. It was this secondary mechanism of adaptation through the inheritance of acquired characteristics that became closely associated with his name and would influence discussions of evolution into the 20th century.

==== Ideas after Lamarck ====
The German Abraham Gottlob Werner believed in geological transformism. Specifically, Werner argued that the Earth undergoes irreversible and continuous change. The Edinburgh school, a radical British school of comparative anatomy, fostered a lot of debate around natural history. Edinburgh, which included the surgeon Robert Knox and the anatomist Robert Grant, was closely in touch with Lamarck's school of French Transformationism, which contained scientists such as Étienne Geoffroy Saint-Hilaire. Grant developed Lamarck's and Erasmus Darwin's ideas of transmutation and evolutionism, investigating homology to prove common descent. As a young student Charles Darwin joined Grant in investigations of the life cycle of marine animals. He also studied geology under professor Robert Jameson whose journal published an anonymous paper in 1826 praising "Mr. Lamarck" for explaining how the higher animals had "evolved" from the "simplest worms" – this was the first use of the word "evolved" in a modern sense. Professor Jameson was a Wernerian, which allowed him to consider transformation theories and foster the interest in transformism among his students. Jameson's course closed with lectures on the "Origin of the Species of Animals".

==== Vestiges of the Natural History of Creation ====
Diagram from the 1844 book Vestiges of the Natural History of Creation by Robert Chambers shows a model of development where fishes (F), reptiles (R), and birds (B) represent branches from a path leading to mammals (M).

The computing pioneer Charles Babbage published his unofficial Ninth Bridgewater Treatise in 1837, putting forward the thesis that God had the omnipotence and foresight to create as a divine legislator, making laws (or programs) which then produced species at the appropriate times, rather than continually interfering with ad hoc miracles each time a new species was required. In 1844 the Scottish publisher Robert Chambers anonymously published an influential and extremely controversial book of popular science entitled Vestiges of the Natural History of Creation. This book proposed an evolutionary scenario for the origins of the Solar System and life on Earth. It claimed that the fossil record showed an ascent of animals with current animals being branches off a main line that leads progressively to humanity. It implied that the transmutations led to the unfolding of a preordained orthogenetic plan woven into the laws that governed the universe. In this sense it was less completely materialistic than the ideas of radicals like Robert Grant, but its implication that humans were just the last step in the ascent of animal life incensed many conservative thinkers. Both conservatives like Adam Sedgwick, and radical materialists like Thomas Henry Huxley, who disliked Chambers' implications of preordained progress, were able to find scientific inaccuracies in the book that they could disparage. Darwin himself openly deplored the author's "poverty of intellect", and dismissed it as a "literary curiosity". However, the high profile of the public debate over Vestiges, with its depiction of evolution as a progressive process, and its popular success, would greatly influence the perception of Darwin's theory a decade later. It also influenced some younger naturalists, including Alfred Russel Wallace, to take an interest in the idea of transmutation.

== Ideological motivations for theories of transmutation ==
The proponents of transmutation were almost all inclined to Deism—the idea, popular among many 18th century Western intellectuals that God had initially created the universe, but then left it to operate and develop through natural law rather than through divine intervention. Thinkers like Erasmus Darwin saw the transmutation of species as part of this development of the world through natural law, which they saw as a challenge to traditional Christianity. They also believed that human history was progressive, which was another idea becoming increasingly popular in the 18th century. They saw progress in human history as being mirrored by the development of life from the simple to the complex over the history of the Earth. This connection was very clear in the work of Erasmus Darwin and Robert Chambers.

== Opposition to transmutation ==
Ideas about the transmutation of species were strongly associated with the anti-Christian materialism and radical political ideas of the Enlightenment and were greeted with hostility by more conservative thinkers. Cuvier attacked the ideas of Lamarck and Geoffroy Saint-Hilaire, agreeing with Aristotle that species were immutable. Cuvier believed that the individual parts of an animal were too closely correlated with one another to allow for one part of the anatomy to change in isolation from the others, and argued that the fossil record showed patterns of catastrophic extinctions followed by re-population, rather than gradual change over time. He also noted that drawings of animals and animal mummies from Egypt, which were thousands of years old, showed no signs of change when compared with modern animals. The strength of Cuvier's arguments and his reputation as a leading scientist helped keep transmutational ideas out of the scientific mainstream for decades.

In Britain, where the philosophy of natural theology remained influential, William Paley wrote the book Natural Theology with its famous watchmaker analogy, at least in part as a response to the transmutational ideas of Erasmus Darwin. Geologists influenced by natural theology, such as Buckland and Sedgwick, made a regular practice of attacking the evolutionary ideas of Lamarck and Grant, and Sedgwick wrote a famously harsh review of The Vestiges of the Natural History of Creation. Although the geologist Charles Lyell opposed scriptural geology, he also believed in the immutability of species, and in his Principles of Geology (1830–1833) he criticized and dismissed Lamarck's theories of development. Instead, he advocated a form of progressive creation, in which each species had its "centre of creation" and was designed for this particular habitat, but would go extinct when this habitat changed.

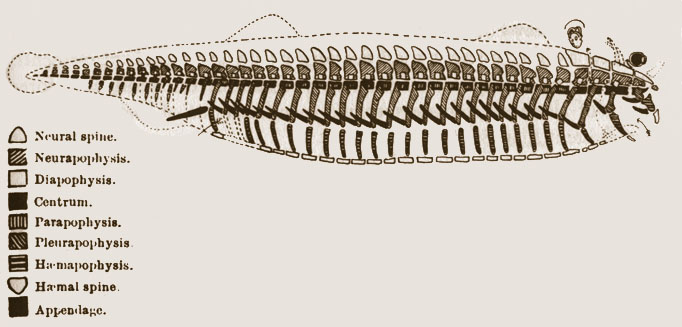
This 1847 diagram by Richard Owen shows his conceptual archetype for all vertebrates.

Another source of opposition to transmutation was a school of naturalists who were influenced by the German philosophers and naturalists associated with idealism, such as Goethe, Hegel and Lorenz Oken. Idealists such as Louis Agassiz and Richard Owen believed that each species was fixed and unchangeable because it represented an idea in the mind of the creator. They believed that relationships between species could be discerned from developmental patterns in embryology, as well as in the fossil record, but that these relationships represented an underlying pattern of divine thought, with progressive creation leading to increasing complexity and culminating in humanity. Owen developed the idea of "archetypes" in the divine mind that would produce a sequence of species related by anatomical homologies, such as vertebrate limbs. Owen was concerned by the political implications of the ideas of transmutationists like Robert Grant, and he led a public campaign by conservatives that successfully marginalized Grant in the scientific community. In his famous 1841 paper, which coined the term dinosaur for the giant reptiles discovered by Buckland and Gideon Mantell, Owen argued that these reptiles contradicted the transmutational ideas of Lamarck because they were more sophisticated than the reptiles of the modern world. Darwin would make good use of the homologies analyzed by Owen in his own theory, but the harsh treatment of Grant, along with the controversy surrounding Vestiges, would be factors in his decision to ensure that his theory was fully supported by facts and arguments before publishing his ideas.

== See also ==
- Chronospecies
- Edward Blyth
- Evolutionary ideas of the Scientific Revolution and Enlightenment
- James Burnett, Lord Monboddo
- James Cowles Prichard
- Patrick Matthew
- William Charles Wells
- William Lawrence (biologist)

== Bibliography ==
- Bowler, Peter J. (2003). Evolution:The History of an Idea. University of California Press. ISBN 0-520-23693-9.
- Desmond, Adrian; Moore, James (1994). Darwin: The Life of a Tormented Evolutionist. W. W. Norton & Company. ISBN 0-393-31150-3.
- Bowler, Peter J.; Morus, Iwan Rhys (2005). Making Modern Science. The University of Chicago Press. ISBN 0-226-06861-7.
- Larson, Edward J. (2004). Evolution:The Remarkable History of Scientific Theory. Modern Library. ISBN 0-679-64288-9.
- Ruse, Michael (2009), Defining Darwin, Amherst New York: Prometheus Books, ISBN 978-1-59102-725-6
- Secord, James A. (2000). Victorian sensation: the extraordinary publication, reception, and secret authorship of the Vestiges of the Natural History of Creation. Chicago.
- van Wyhe, John (27 March 2007). "Mind the gap: Did Darwin avoid publishing his theory for many years?" (PDF). Notes and Records of the Royal Society. 61 (2): 177–205. doi:10.1098/rsnr.2006.0171. S2CID 202574857.
