= Jonathan Birch (EIC captain) =

British sea captain (1771/2–1848)

- Born: c. 1771/1772
- Died: September 1848; Alford, Lincolnshire
- Occupation: Sea captain
- Employer: East India Company
- Organization: The Marine Society (committee member)
- Known for: East India Company captain
- Spouse: Mary Elizabeth Morrice (d. 1822)
- Children: William John Birch (son); Elizabeth Mary Morice Birch (daughter, d. 1831)
- Parent: Rev. Thomas Birch
- Relatives: William Charles Macready (cousin/close friend); William Birch (grandson)

Jonathan Birch (1771/2 – September 1848) was a British sea captain for the East India Company. He became a close friend of the actor William Charles Macready, whose diary is a major source for Birch's background and life.

== Naval career ==
Birch was an East India Company ship captain, making a number of voyages; a report of 1837 gave his age as 65, the senior surviving captain. He captained the Britannia, lost off Brazil in 1805. He then captained its successor of the same name, Britannia.

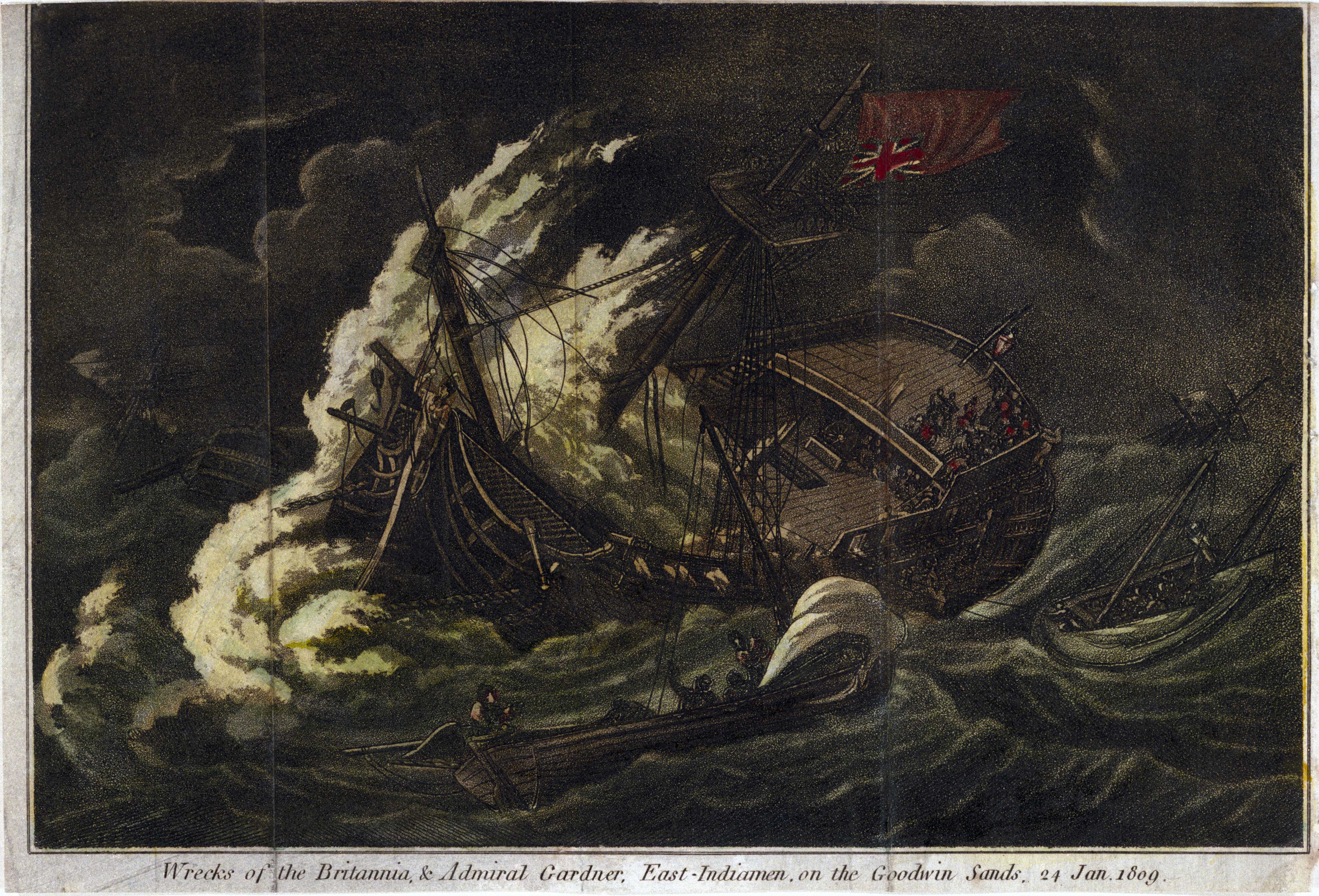
Wrecks of the Britannia, and Admiral Gardner, East Indiamen, on the Goodwin Sands, 24 Jan 1809

Birch's second command Britannia ended in a wrecking on the Goodwin Sands off the South Foreland on 24 January 1809, in company with the Admiral Gardner and the brig Apollo. He then took the Cabalva on an 1813/4 voyage to Bombay and China.

== On land ==
Birch in retirement from the sea resided in Gower Street, London, and at Pudlicote House, near Shorthampton in Oxfordshire, built in 1810, which he purchased in 1822.

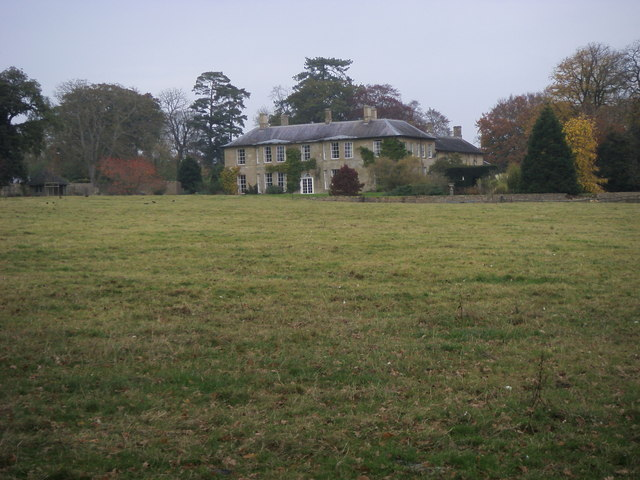
Pudlicote House, 2009 photograph

Birch was on the committee of The Marine Society.

== Relationship with Macready and family background ==
The Rev. Thomas Birch was rector of South Thoresby, which is not far to the west of Alford; he was a brother of the surgeon Charles Birch, maternal grandfather of William Charles Macready the actor. Jonathan Birch was his son. Birch was a therefore a relation of Macready on the latter's mother's side.

Macready while he was on tour in New York, and hearing of Jonathan Birch's death, called him "my dear friend and relative". His mother was Christina Ann Birch, granddaughter of the Rev. Jonathan Birch of Bakewell (1685–1735); his housemaster at Rugby School was a cousin (once removed) William Birch, son of the Rev. Thomas Birch of Alford, Lincolnshire, a son of Jonathan Birch of Bakewell.

== Death ==
Jonathan Birch died in 1848, at age 76, at Alford.

== Family ==
Birch, described as of St Pancras, London, married Mary Elizabeth Morrice (died 1822), daughter of William Morice. They had a son, William John Birch, known as a writer. A brother and two sisters of William John died young. The eldest daughter, Elizabeth Mary Morice Birch, died in 1831 at age 23.

After Birch's death, his brother George brought a case on the interpretation of his will of 1845 in the Prerogative Court of Canterbury.
