= William Chilton =

William Chilton may refer to:

- William Chilton (printer) (1815–1855), printer, Owenite Socialist, atheist, evolutionist, and co-founder of The Oracle of Reason
- William E. Chilton (1858–1939), United States Senator
- William Parish Chilton (1810–1871), Alabama lawyer, jurist and politician
