= Fergus Butler-Gallie =

English Anglican priest and author (born 1992)

The Reverend Fergus Butler Gallie
- Born: 1992 (age 33–34)
- Education: St John's College, Oxford; Emmanuel College, Cambridge
- Occupations: Priest, ecclesiastical author, and writer of newspaper articles
- Spouse: Madeline Grant
- Religion: Anglican Christianity
- Church: Church of England

Fergus Butler-Gallie (born 1992) is an Anglican priest who is currently vicar of Charlbury at its Church of St. Mary and at its nearby All Saints' Church, Shorthampton. He is notable for his 2018 book A Field Guide to the English Clergy.

== Early life ==
Butler-Gallie grew up in Bethersden, Kent. He was educated at Tonbridge School, and at St John's College, Oxford, where he read history and Czech-Slovak. He then trained for ordination at Westcott House, Cambridge, while studying for another degree in theology at Emmanuel College, Cambridge. He has taught at the College of the Transfiguration, at Rhodes University in South Africa, and lived in the Czech Republic.

== Ordained ministry ==
Butler-Gallie was ordained, first as a deacon and then as a priest, in the Anglican Diocese of Liverpool, when he was aged 26 years, and served his curacy at Liverpool Parish Church. He then served as assistant chaplain at his alma mater Tonbridge School, until, on 17 January 2024, he was appointed vicar of Charlbury, Oxfordshire, at its Church of St. Mary and at its nearby All Saints' Church, Shorthampton.

== Writing ==
Butler-Gallie is known publicly for his ecclesiastical books and newspaper articles. They include:

- A Field Guide to English Clergy
- Priests de la Resistance!
- Touching Cloth: Confessions and Communions of a Young Priest
- Twelve Churches: An Unlikely History of the Buildings that Made Christianity

He was the 2023 winner of the P. G. Wodehouse Society's essay-competition, for his essay "The Hour Breeds Thought - Night Time in the Stories of P. G. Wodehouse".

== Personal life ==
Butler-Gallie is married to the journalist Madeline Grant. She is the daughter of the journalist Sally Jones and is now Assistant Editor of The Spectator.

In 2014, prior to his ordination, Butler-Gallie featured on Series 10 Episode 3 of the quiz-show Only Connect, as a member of 'The Wandering Minstrels'.
