= Anti-Persecution Union =

Former British freethinkers organization, established in 1842

The Anti-Persecution Union was a British organisation established by the freethinkers George Jacob Holyoake and Emma Martin in 1842, to aid in defending individuals accused of blasphemy and blasphemous libel. Its object was "to assert and maintain the right of free discussion, and to protect and defend the victims of intolerance and bigotry".

== Formation and purpose ==
Described as a "militant freethought league", the Union came on the heels of a number of prosecutions for blasphemy. As such, its efforts were "defensive as well as propagandistic". Following the prosecution of Charles Southwell, and building on the "Committee for the Protection of Mr. Southwell" established for him, The Oracle of Reason encouraged its readers to assist in the formation of a Union:

whose great and glorious objects shall be to abolish all law or legal practice which shackles expression of opinion, and to protect and indemnify all, or whatever persuasion, whether Jew, Christian, Infidel, Atheist, or other denomination in danger of similar tyrannies.

David Nash has noted that, despite the inclusion of all denominations and none, the Union was "clearly aimed at freethinkers".

By the Union's first meeting, at the radical John Street Institution on Tottenham Court Road, London, the prosecutions of Southwell, Holyoake, and George and Harriet Adams were discussed. The meeting's first resolution, moved by Emma Martin, expressed "strong disapprobation of all legal interference with the free expression of opinion" and "emphatically deprecate[d] the recent prosecutions for the alleged crime of blasphemy, as unjust and impolitic." Martin's own atheism was infamous, causing division and disapproval among many of her own socialist associates. It was, Barbara Taylor has suggested, in part her anger at this absence of support that she and Holyoake formed the Union.

The Union published its activities in The Oracle of Reason (1841–43) and The Movement and Anti-Persecution Gazette (1843–45). For four months it circulated The Monthly Circular of the Anti-Persecution Union, edited by Holyoake. Reports of the trials of Holyoake, Matilda Roalfe, Thomas Finlay, and Thomas Paterson were also published on the Union's behalf by Henry Hetherington and Paterson.

== Other groups ==
A Scottish Anti-Persecution Union was also established, responding to prosecutions in Scotland. An appeal in The Oracle of Reason stated that the Union was:

made up of individual professors of almost every kind of opinion - political, religious, and irreligious... [and] formed for the sole purpose of setting free the tongue and the press; therefore, all who are persecuted for expressing, or otherwise publishing their opinions, will have a legitimate claim to its support.

In February 1844, a Leicester Committee of the Anti-Persecution Union was formed. Its first secretary, William Henry Holyoak, had received permission the previous year, as reported in The Movement. Multiple members of the Leicester Committee were later part of the Leicester Secular Society, the world's oldest, founded in 1851.
