= Cabalva (1811 EIC ship) =

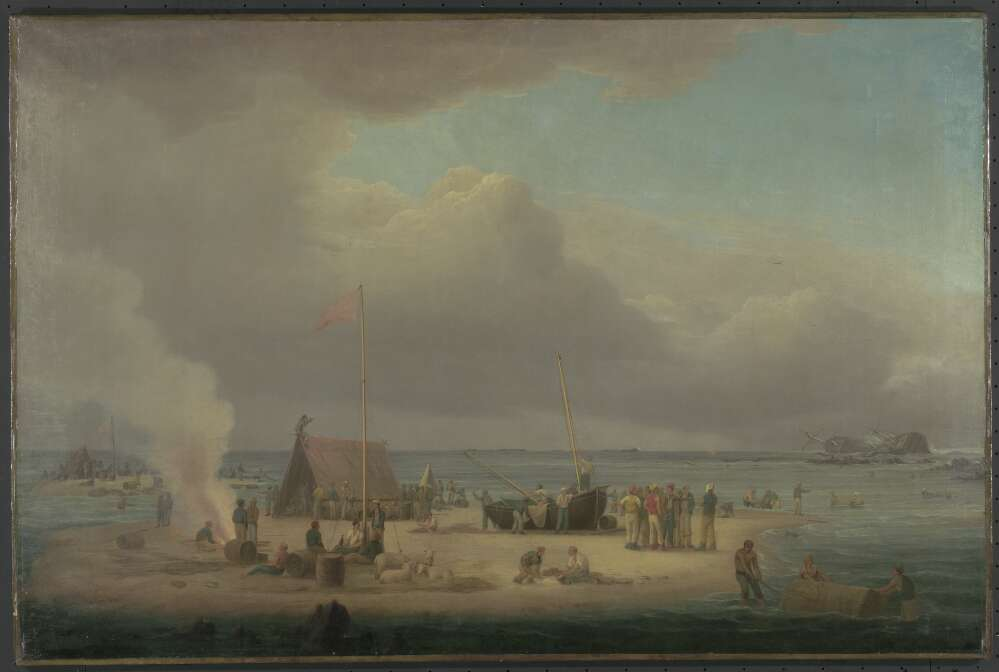
- The East India Company's ship Cabalva, 1257 tons, Captain James Dalrymple, lost in Cargados Shoal, near Mauritius, 7 July 1818, on a voyage to China; Thomas Whitcombe, c. 1820

History

United Kingdom
- Name: Cabalva
- Namesake: Cabalva estate in the Wye Valley
- Owner: Voyages 1 & 2:William Davies; Voyages 3 & 4:John Card
- Builder: Wells, Wigram & Green, Yard №146, Blackwall.
- Launched: 3 October 1811
- Fate: Wrecked 1818

General characteristics
- Tons burthen: 1200, or 1257, or 125730/94, or 1349 (bm)
- Length: 165 ft 7 7/8 in (50.5 m) (overall), 134 ft 0 in (40.8 m) (keel)
- Beam: 42 ft 0 in (12.8 m)
- Depth of hold: 17 ft 1 in (5.2 m)
- Sail plan: Full-rigged ship
- Complement: 120
- Armament: 36 × 18-pounder guns + 12 × 18-pounder carronades
- Notes: Three decks

Cabalva was an East Indiaman, launched in 1811. She made three voyages for the British East India Company (EIC) before she was wrecked in 1818 on the outbound leg of her fourth voyage.

== Career ==
=== Voyage №1 (1812-1813) ===
Captain Jonathan Birch received a letter of marque on 30 October 1811. He sailed Cabalva from Torbay on 4 January 1812, bound for Bombay and China. She reached Bombay on 6 May, Penang on 13 July, and Malacca on 25 July. She arrived at Whampoa on 11 September. Homeward bound, she crossed the second Bar on 2 November, reached St Helena on 28 March 1813, and arrived at Long Reach on 7 June.

=== Voyage №2 (1813–1815) ===
Birch sailed Cabalva from Portsmouth on 31 December 1813, bound for Bombay and China. She reached Bombay on 21 March 1814, Penang on 6 August, Malacca on 22 August, and Lintin on 29 September. she arrived at Whampoa on 30 November. Homeward bound, she crossed the Second Bar on 7 January 1815, and reached St Helena on 19 April. She arrived at Purfleet on 27 June.

=== Voyage №3 (1816–1817) ===
At 2am on 17 January 1816, strong winds at Deal resulted the East Indiaman Marquis of Huntly to break free of her cables and anchors and run into Cabalava, but with minimal damage.

Captain John Hine sailed Cabalva from the Downs on 23 January 1816. She reached Bombay on 15 May, Penang on 13 July, and Malacca on 26 July. She arrived at Whampoa on 19 August. Homeward bound, she crossed the Second Bar on 30 October, and reached St Helena on 2 March 1817. She arrived at Gravesend on 6 May.

== Loss ==
Captain James Dalrymple left the Downs on 16 April 1818, bound for China on Cabalva's fourth journey. On 22 June, Cabalva sprang a leak off the Cape of Good Hope and Dalrymple set course for Bombay for repairs.

On 7 July Cabalva ran ashore on the rocky uninhabited island of Cargados, Cargados Carajos shoals. Captain Dalrymple, Assistant Surgeon Grant, and 15 seamen were the last to leave the wreck in the longboat. All were drowned when it capsized in heavy seas.

The ship's cutter survived. Sixth mate Charles William Francken and a party of ten men set out on 13 July for Mauritius to get help. Although they had no navigation instruments, they arrived there on 17 July. HMS Magicienne and HMS Challenger set out immediately, arriving at the wreck site on 20 July. Magicienne remained on site to salvage what she could from the wreck site. Challenger removed the survivors and landed them at Mauritius.

The Court of Directors of the EIC awarded Captain John Brett Purvis of Magicienne 200 guineas to enable him to purchase a piece of silver plate. They also awarded Charles William Francken with 50 guineas and a sextant with this inscription "Presented by UEI Company Director to Mr. Charles William Franchen late Sixth Officer of HCS Cabalva as a mark of their high approval of his conduct while in charge of the cutter he proceeded without chart or compasses from Cardagos Shoals to Mauritius to procure assistance for the surviving crew of the ill-fated ship, who wrecked on July 7, 1818."

== Postscript ==
The EIC did not insure its vessels. At £26 10s per ton to build, Cabalva cost some £34,000 in 1811. The EIC valued the lost cargo at £149,570.

In 1985 divers located the wreck site and were able to recover a number of Spanish "pieces of 8". These have found their way to numismatic auctions.
