= Britannia (1806 EIC ship) =

British sailing ship launched in 1806

History

United Kingdom
- Name: Britannia
- Owner: British East India Company
- Builder: Perry & Wells, Blackwall
- Launched: 29 September 1806
- Fate: Wrecked 25 January 1809

General characteristics
- Tons burthen: 1200, 1273, or 127373/94, or 1349, (bm)
- Length: 165 ft 5 1/2 in (50.4 m) (overall); 133 ft 7 1/2 in (40.7 m) (keel)
- Beam: 42 ft 4 in (12.9 m)
- Depth of hold: 17 ft 1 in (5.2 m)
- Complement: 138
- Armament: 38 x 9&18-pounder guns

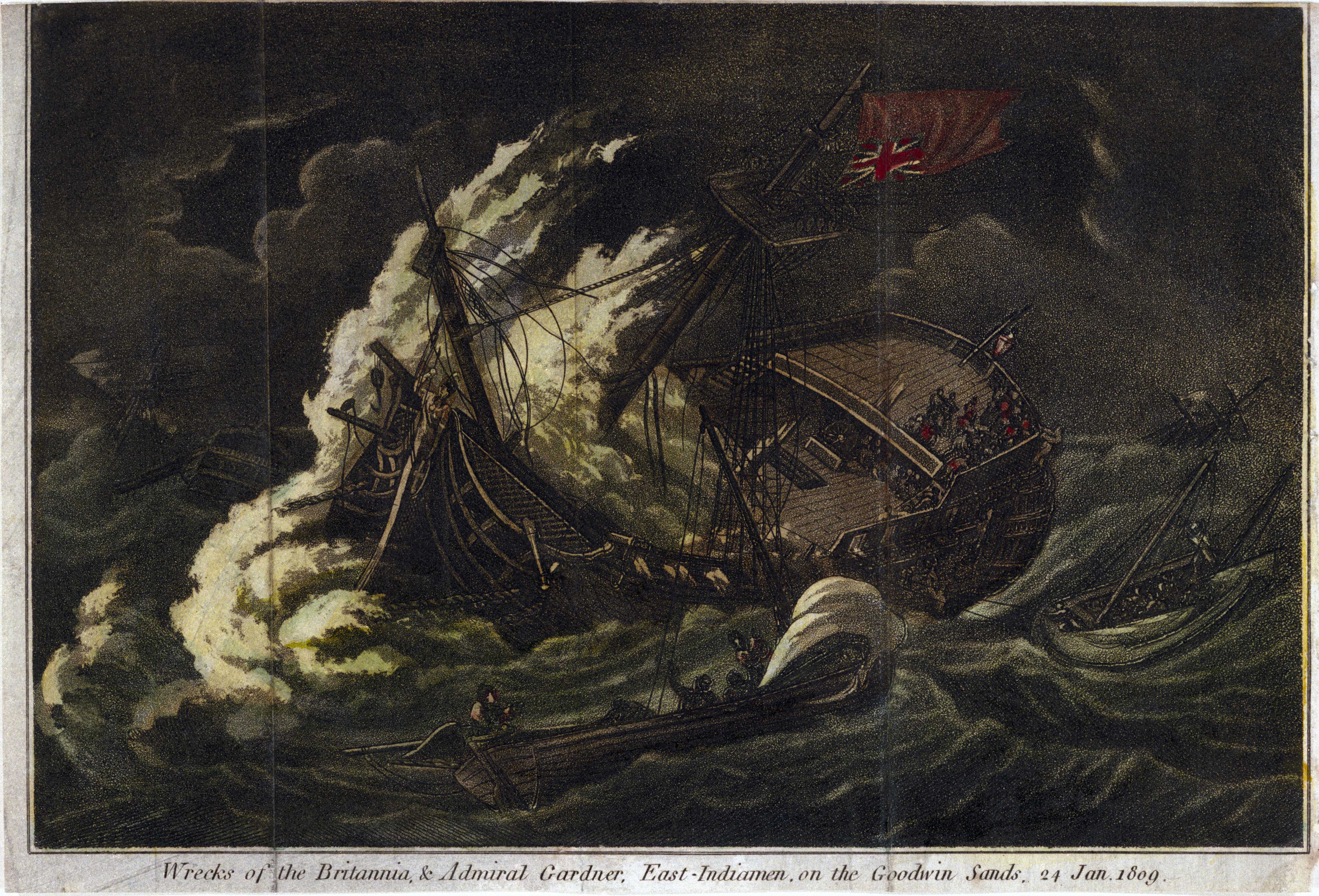
The wrecks of Britannia and Admiral Gardner, East Indiamen, on the Goodwin Sands, 24 January 1809

Britannia was launched in 1806 as an East Indiaman for the British East India Company. She made only one voyage for the company before a gale wrecked her in January 1809.

Captain Jonathan Birch received a letter of marque on 3 November 1806. He sailed Britannia from Portsmouth on 26 February 1807, bound for Bombay and China. He returned from that voyage on 1 July 1808.

Birch and Britannia were in the Downs on 24 January 1809, prior to setting out on a second voyage to the east, this time to Madras and China.

The next day, 25 January, a howling gale tore her from her moorings off Deal, Kent, and she wrecked on the Goodwin Sands off the South Foreland. Seven of her crew drowned. The EIC valued her cargo at £57,091; the total loss, vessel plus cargo, was £117,820.

The gale also wrecked the Indiaman Admiral Gardner and the brig Apollo. Only one man of Apollo's crew of 20 survived. Boatmen from Deal were able to rescue almost the entire crew from Admiral Gardner. A few days later, Lloyd's List reported that all three wrecked vessels had gone to pieces.
