= Admiral Gardner (1797 EIC ship) =

1797 East India Company ship, wrecked in 1809

History

Great Britain
- Name: Admiral Gardner
- Owner: John Woolmore
- Operator: British East India Company
- Builder: Melhuish, Limehouse (sub-contracted from Perry, Blackwall)
- Launched: 12 April 1797
- Fate: Wrecked 25 January 1809

General characteristics
- Tons burthen: 813, or 816 or 852 (bm)
- Length: 145 ft 8 in (44.4 m) (overall); 118 ft 3 1/2 in (36.1 m) (keel)
- Beam: 36 ft 2 1/2 in (11.0 m)
- Depth of hold: 14 ft 10 in (4.5 m)
- Propulsion: Sail
- Complement: 1797:90; 1803:80; 1805:100; 1806:100
- Armament: 1797:28 × 12&6-pounder guns; 1803:28 × 12&6-pounder guns; 1805:28 × 12&6-pounder guns; 1806:28 × 12&6-pounder guns
- Notes: Three decks

Admiral Gardner was launched in 1797 as an East Indiaman for the British East India Company (EIC). She made five voyages for the EIC, during the fourth of which she participated in an inconclusive single-ship action with a French privateer. Admiral Gardner was wrecked in January 1809. The wreck is a Protected Wreck managed by Historic England. She was named after Admiral Alan Gardner.

== Career ==
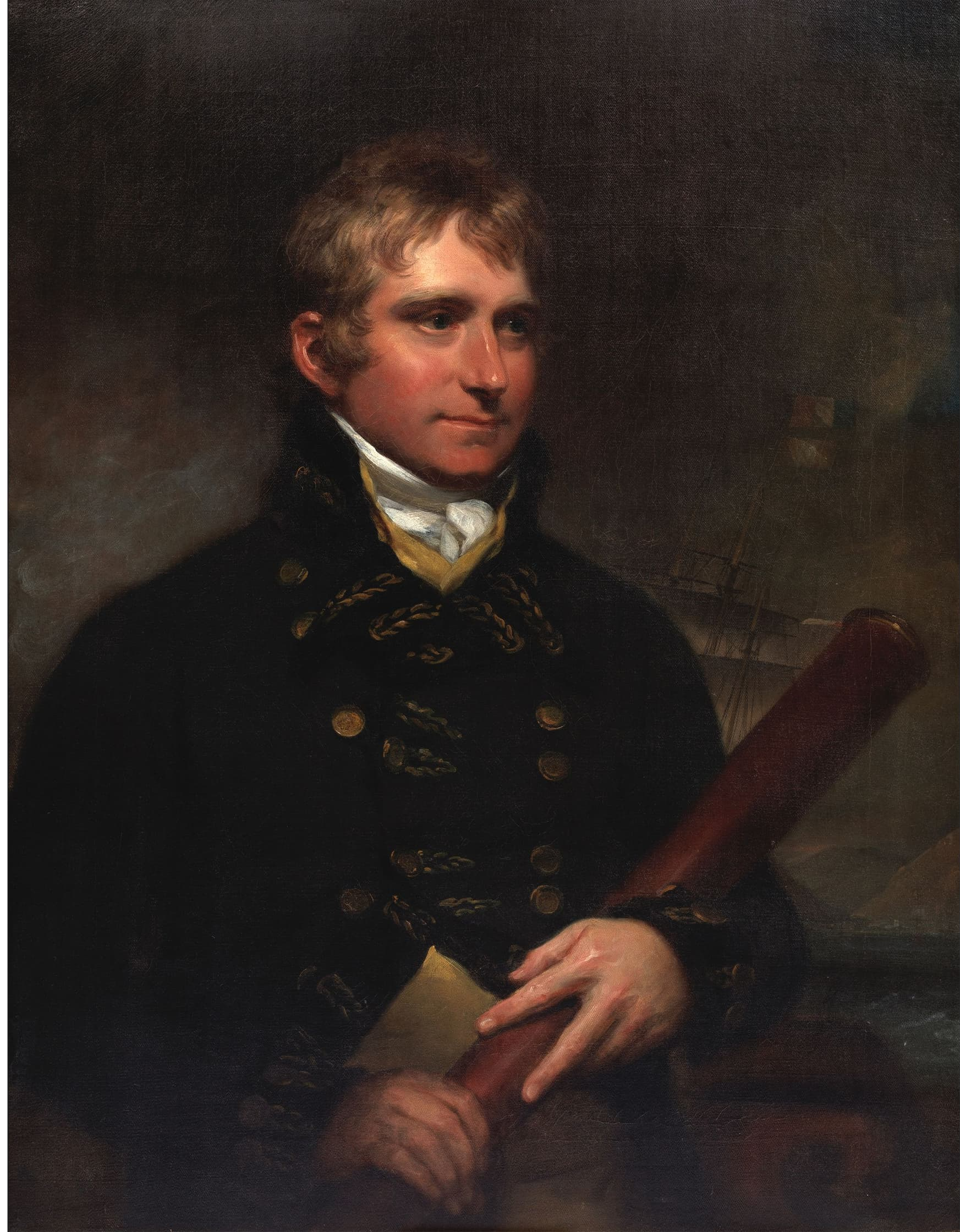
Portrait of Captain Edward Chapman Bradford, by William Beechey

EIC voyage #1 (1797-1799): Captain Edward Chapman Bradford acquired a letter of marque on 10 June 1797. He sailed from Torbay on 22 September 1797, bound for Bengal and Bencoolen. Admiral Gardner reached Kedgeree on 16 February 1798. On 27 June, she reached Bencoolen, and by 11 August, was back at Kedgeree. She was at Saugor on 24 September, and Bencoolen again on 5 November. Homeward bound, Admiral Gardner reached St Helena on 27 March 1799. Admiral Gardner returned to St Helena on 24 April. She arrived back at Blackwall on 4 August.

EIC voyage #2 (1801-1802): Captain Bradford sailed from Portsmouth on 31 March 1801, bound for Madras and China. Admiral Gardner reached Madras on 26 July. She was at Penang on 28 August, and arrived at Whampoa Anchorage on 6 October. Homeward bound, she reached St Helena on 12 April 1802, and arrived at Blackwall on 12 July.

EIC voyage #3 (1803-1804): Captain Bradford sailed from the Downs on 1 February 1803, bound for Madras and Bengal. On 12 February, Admiral Gardner was at Madeira. She reached the Cape of Good Hope on 23 April, and Madras 13 June; she arrived at Diamond Harbour on 22 July. The next day Bradford acquired a letter of marque. Homeward bound, Admiral Gardner was at Saugor on 7 November, reached St Helena on 12 March 1804, and arrived at Blackwall on 11 June.

EIC voyage #4 (1805-1806): Captain George Saltwell acquired a letter of marque on 21 January 1805. He sailed from Portsmouth on 25 April 1805, bound for St Helena and Madras. On 28 November, at 6°4′N 93°25′E, Admiral Gardner encountered a French privateer of 32 guns. A single-ship action ensued in which the French vessel was able to damage Admiral Gardner's rigging. The privateer did not press the attack and by the next day she had disappeared. Admiral Gardner had 10 men wounded, three severely. (Note: There is some ambiguity concerning the privateer's identity. A letter from Saltwell states that he later found out that the privateer was Jeune Adèle. However the only record of a Jeune Adèle in 1804 has her as a schooner operating out of Guadeloupe. Other accounts report that the privateer was Bellone. By one account, Saltwell dressed some of his seamen as soldiers, and rigged anti-boarding nets. Bellone's captain later told another EIC captain that given Admiral Gardner's preparations and resistance, he had veered off because he did not wish to risk his own vessel being crippled. Bellone had 36 guns and 200 men to Admiral Gardner's 26 guns and 120 men. The description of Bellone and the locus of the engagement are more consistent with the privateer being Bellone.)

On 4 December, Admiral Gardner reached Madras. Homeward bound, she was at Colombo on 21 February 1806, reached St Helena on 14 May, and arrived at Blackwall on 1 August.

On 4 August, the East India Docks opened. In the celebration of the opening, the lead vessel to enter was the Trinity yacht, the yacht belonging to Trinity House. The next vessel was Admiral Gardner, chosen in recognition of her defense against the privateer. She was to have been third, after Earl Camden, Commodore Nathaniel Dance's flagship at the Battle of Pulo Aura, but adverse winds prevented Earl Camden's arrival.

EIC voyage #5 (1807-1808): Captain William John Eastfield acquired a letter of marque on 30 December 1806. He sailed from Portsmouth on 26 February 1807, bound for Madras and Bengal. Admiral Gardner reached Madras on 3 July, and Kedgeree on 21 July, and arrived at Diamond Harbour on 26 July. Homeward bound, she was at Saugor on 16 September, Madras on 22 October, and the cape on 30 December. She reached St Helena on 25 January 1808, and arrived at Blackwall on 28 April.

== Fate ==
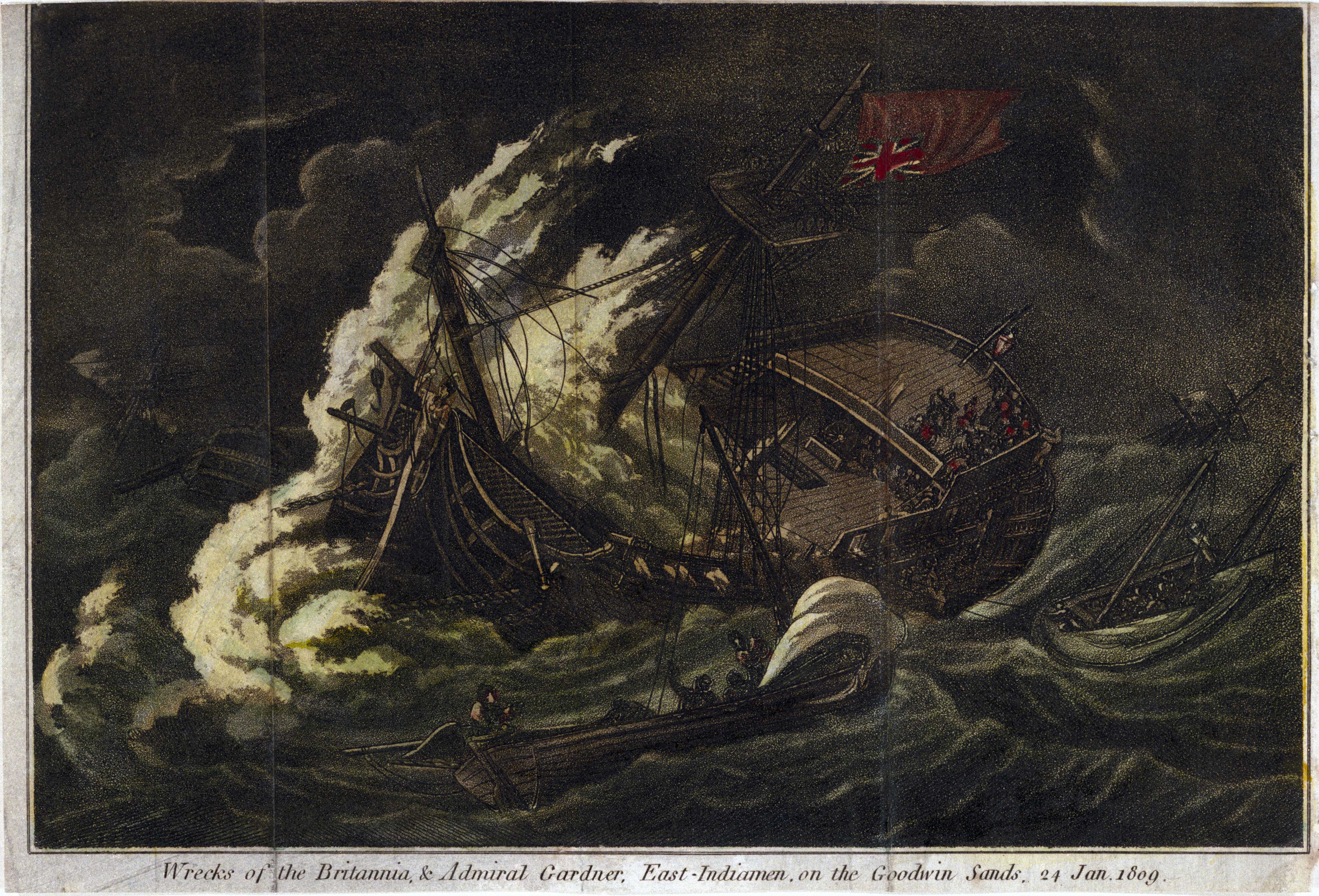
The wrecks of Britannia and Admiral Gardner on the Goodwin Sands, 24 January 1809

On 24 January 1809, Captain Eastfield sailed from the Downs, bound for Madras and Bengal, at the start of Admiral Gardner's sixth voyage for the EIC. The next day Admiral Gardner was lost on the Goodwin Sands off South Foreland when a gale tore her from her moorings. Three (or five) crew drowned.

Lost with Admiral Gardner was her cargo, a large number of EIC X and XX copper cash coins, belonging to Matthew Boulton. The EIC put the value of its cargo at £21,579.

The same gale also wrecked Britannia, and the brig Apollo. (Note: Apollo, Ridall, master, was on a voyage from London to Curacoa. Only one man of her crew of 20 survived.) Boatmen from Deal were able to rescue almost the entire crew from Admiral Gardner. Boatmen from Ramsgate and Broadstairs saved most of the crew of Britannia, but only one man from the brig.

A few days later Lloyd's List reported that all three wrecked vessels had gone to pieces.

== Rediscovery ==
The wreck of Admiral Gardner was found in 1984, and some coins were salvaged in 1985 during a licensed dive. The wreck was designated under the Protection of Wrecks Act on 2 May 1985, and redesignated to extend the area covered on 5 October 2004.
