= William Chilton (printer) =

Printer, Owenite and evolutionist

William Chilton (1815 – 28 May 1855), was a printer, Owenite, evolutionist, and co-founder with Charles Southwell of The Oracle of Reason, which claimed to be the world's first avowedly atheist journal.

== Life ==
Born in Bristol, the son of William and Mary Ann Chilton, Chilton's first occupation was that of bricklayer, before becoming a compositor and reader for the local Bristol Mercury. He remained with the Bristol Mercury until his death, and according to Adrian Desmond (2004) his campaigning and propagandist activities had to be "squeezed around his 10-hour working day as a compositor. He would camp in his works for weeks on end..."

On 26 September 1843, Chilton married Mary Ann Morris. They had two daughters: Kate (born in 1846), and Lucy (born in 1848).

Chilton died at the young age of forty, and was buried in Bristol on 2 June 1855.

== The Oracle of Reason ==
The Oracle of Reason was founded by Chilton, Charles Southwell and John Field in 1841. It lasted until 1843. It was an aggressive and deliberately confrontational journal from the outset. Southwell, as editor, was imprisoned for twelve months after just a handful of issues, and was replaced by George Jacob Holyoake. When Holyoake was gaoled in August 1842, Thomas Paterson took over. William Chilton became editor in June 1843 after Thomas Paterson's arrest. Although considered to be the firmest atheist of the group, Chilton was a more cautious editor and he was never prosecuted. After the closure of the Oracle, Chilton joined Holyoake at Holyoake's The Movement, a weekly journal which was much more moderate in approach than the Oracle.

According to Holyoake,

Chilton was a cogent, solid writer, ready for any risk, and the only absolute atheist I have known. His articles in the Oracle on the "Theory of Regular Gradation" preceded by twelve years the articles on Evolution by Herbert Spencer in the Leader, when "regular gradation" began to receive the name of evolution.

=== Evolution ===
Chilton was an early advocate of evolution. His writings on "The Theory of Regular Gradation" that were published in The Oracle of Reason, popularised evolution many years before Charles Darwin.

Chilton was a materialist who viewed matter as eternal and inherently possessing all properties to produce life. He rejected any distinction between living and non-living matter and considered all matter to be alive. Chilton was influenced by the evolutionary ideas of Jean-Baptiste Lamarck. He embraced Lamarckism and the transmutation of species. His writings on transformism preceded Chambers's Vestiges of the Natural History of Creation by a few years. Chilton took interest in the book but criticized Chambers for mixing science with religious speculation.

== Bibliography ==
- Berman, David (1990). A history of atheism in Britain from Hobbes to Russell. Routledge.
- Desmond, Adrian (1987). "Artisan resistance and evolution in Britain, 1819-1848". Osiris, 2nd series, Vol.3, pp. 77–110.
- Desmond, Adrian (2004). "Chilton, William (1815–1855)", Oxford Dictionary of National Biography, Oxford University Press, Sept 2004
- Holyoake, George Jacob (1906). Sixty Years of an Agitator's Life. 6th impression. London: T. Fisher Unwin.
- Rectenwald, Michael (2013). "Secularism and the cultures of nineteenth-century scientific naturalism." The British Journal for the History of Science. Vol. 46, Issue 02 pp. 231–254.
- Rectenwald, Michael. (2016) Nineteenth-Century British Secularism: Science, Religion and Literature. Palgrave Macmillan.
- Royle, Edward (1974). Victorian infidels: the origins of the British secularist movement, 1791-1866. Manchester University Press.
