= Charles Southwell =

British journalist (1814–1860)

- Born: 1814; London, England
- Died: 7 August 1860 (aged 45–46); Auckland, New Zealand
- Occupations: Radical and journalist

Charles Southwell (1814 – 7 August 1860) was a radical English journalist, freethinker and colonial advocate.

== Early life ==
Charles Southwell was born in London, the youngest of 33 children in a poor family. His father, William, was a piano maker who had married three times. His mother, Fanny (William's third wife), was William's ex-servant, and at least three decades younger than him. Charles was Fanny's only child. A difficult pupil, but well-read, Southwell left school at the age of twelve (his father died in 1825 or 1826) and got work in a piano factory. It was while working at Broadwood and Sons that Southwell, encouraged by a Christian colleague, read the Sermons of Timothy Dwight and began thinking seriously about religion, only to reject it (as had his father).

== Radical career ==
In 1830, Southwell set up as a radical bookseller in Westminster, London, and joined the radical lecture circuit.

Southwell married Mary Seaton in 1832, but the relationship was a troubled one. On Mary's death (c. 1835), Southwell witnessed the surgical removal of her heart to ensure she was dead, as Mary had requested.

In 1835 he fought as a volunteer with the British Legion during the First Carlist War. Returning in poverty-stricken state a couple of years later, he again found employment at Broadwoods. But he also became more involved in radicalism.

Although he had been a radical bookseller, it was not until Southwell's return from Spain that he became more deeply involved in Robert Owen's socialist movement. He was confirmed as an Owenite "socialist missionary" by the Association of All Classes of All Nations in 1840, and worked in that capacity in London and Birmingham.

== The Oracle of Reason ==
In 1841, a group of "socialist missionaries" split from Robert Owen, partly over the issue of whether socialist lecturers should take the oath usually taken by dissenting ministers. Clerical opponents of Owenism were threatening to use the law to prevent money being taken at meetings on Sundays. Only religious bodies were permitted to do so. Owenite lecturers were either to stop collecting money on Sundays, or make a public profession of adherence to Christianity. In Campfield, Manchester, the Rev. J. W. Kidd took legal action against the Hall of Science near his church. The Owenite missionary Robert Buchanan consequently took the dissenter's oath. The Central Board of Owen's Universal Community Society was in favour of taking the oath, and of moderating anti-religious activity, and other lecturers followed Buchanan. But others, including Charles Southwell, refused, and resigned their positions.

According to Royle (1976, p. 42):

Charles Southwell... was not prepared to see the anti-theological side of Owenism played down by hypocrites on the Universal Community Society central board. He had entered the Owenite movement through the Lambeth branch after he had made a reputation for himself as an anti-theological lecturer on Kennington Common. He firmly believed, and many Owenites shared his view, that religion must be destroyed if truth were to prevail: freethought was therefore the necessary prerequisite for socialism, and neutrality on religious issues was impossible.

With William Chilton, Southwell opened a freethought bookshop in Bristol in late 1841, and with Chilton and John Field he launched the confrontationally atheistic Oracle of Reason. He was arrested for blasphemy (see the Oracle of Reason entry for the story) on 27 November 1841, spending 17 days in jail awaiting bail. He faced trial in January 1842, and defended himself. Found guilty, Southwell was fined £100, and sentenced to twelve months in prison. On his release, Southwell discovered that the Oracle, after a succession of editors had been imprisoned, was struggling financially, so he began his own journal, the (more moderate) Investigator. It survived for seven months. After a lecture tour and a spell as a well-reviewed Shakespearean actor, Southwell launched the Lancashire Beacon in 1849, which also failed to last a full year. It closed in 1850.

Southwell subsequently left the country.

== Australia and New Zealand ==
Southwell emigrated to Australia in April 1855, moving to Auckland, New Zealand, in 1856. His emigration was unexpected and sudden, but should be seen in the context of his being disinherited, and difficult relations with Holyoake.

Arriving in Melbourne in July 1855, Southwell initially sought to make his living as a lecturer (avoiding the subject of religion, since few people in Australia knew his background). But when he tried to run for public office, his blasphemy conviction was used against him, and he lost. He supported himself as a touring actor, and it seems that when his group performed in New Zealand in January 1856, Southwell decided to move to Auckland, where, as Cooke (2006) observes, he was "the first acknowledged freethinker to appear on New Zealand shores."

In New Zealand, Southwell lectured against the Russian cause in the Crimean War and published the anti-corruption Auckland Examiner. Southwell was hostile toward Maori, as he called Maori "savages" and was opposed to missionary support for Maori land claims. The Examiner was closed by an ailing and penniless Southwell in July 1860, just two weeks before his death.

Charles Southwell was buried in Auckland's Symonds Street Cemetery.

== Southwell's legacy ==
The Encyclopedist of unbelief Gordon Stein summarised Southwell's significance in the history of freethought as follows:

Southwell's importance was largely as a publisher. He was responsible for reviving the wave of blasphemy prosecutions that occurred during the early 1840s, and his conduct in publishing the Oracle of Reason was largely responsible for moving the freethought movement into a more open and defiant atheistic phase.

The New Zealand Association of Rationalists and Humanists commemorated Southwell by naming the "Charles Southwell Award" after him. It was first awarded in 1998 .

== Bibliography ==
- Cooke, Bill (2006). "Southwell, Charles". p. 498 in Dictionary of atheism, scepticism, & humanism. Amherst, New York: Prometheus Books. ISBN 1-59102-299-1.
- Cooke, Bill (2012). "Charles Southwell: One of the Romances of Rationalism". Journal of Freethought History, Vol 2 No 2, Autumn 2012.
- Herrick, Jim (2007). "Southwell, Charles". pp. 724–725 in Flynn, Tom (ed.) The New Encyclopedia of Unbelief. Amherst, New York: Prometheus Books. ISBN 978-1-59102-391-3.
- Mullen, Shirley A. (1992). "Keeping the faith: the struggle for a militant atheist press." Victorian Periodicals Review, Vol. 25 (4), Winter, pp. 150–158.
- Royle, Edward (ed.) (1976). The Infidel Tradition: from Paine to Bradlaugh. London: Macmillan.
- Secord, J.A. (2004). "Southwell, Charles (1814–1860)." Oxford Dictionary of National Biography, Oxford University Press. Online, accessed 22 July 2009.
- Smith, F.B. (1990). "Southwell, Charles (1814–1860)." Dictionary of New Zealand Biography, updated 22 June 2007.
- Stein, Gordon (1985). "Southwell, Charles." The Encyclopedia of Unbelief, Vol. II, pp. 636–637. Buffalo, New York: Prometheus Books.
- Stenhouse, John (2005). "Imperialism, atheism, and race: Charles Southwell, Old Corruption, and the Maori." Journal of British Studies, Vol. 44 (4), October, pp. 754–774.

== Writings ==
- An Apology for Atheism. (1846) Available from Project Gutenberg
- Confessions of a Freethinker. (undated, c. 1850) Available from Google Books
- Superstition Unveiled. (1854) Available from Project Gutenberg
