= The Oracle of Reason =

Atheistic periodical

The Oracle of Reason, or Philosophy Vindicated was the first avowedly atheistic periodical to be published in Britain. It was founded by Charles Southwell, William Chilton and John Field in 1841, and lasted until 1843. Several of its editors were imprisoned for blasphemy.

== History ==
The Oracle owed its origins to a split in Robert Owen's Universal Community Society. For the early background, see Charles Southwell.

The first issue of the weekly Oracle was published on 6 November 1841 (price: 1d), and the last issue was dated 2 December 1843. It was published 6 November 1841 to 8 January 1842, then there was a gap before publication resumed from 12 February 1842 to 2 December 1843. According to Royle (1974, p. 74), it was "at first highly successful, selling on average about four thousand copies a week."

The first editor of the Oracle was Charles Southwell. George Jacob Holyoake took over when Southwell was imprisoned, and when Holyoake was imprisoned Thomas Paterson became editor. When Paterson was jailed, William Chilton took over.

=== Southwell prosecuted for blasphemy ===
The fourth issue of the Oracle included a deliberately provocative article antisemitically entitled "The Jew Book," which described the Bible as "This revoltingly odious Jew production..." As a consequence, Charles Southwell was arrested for blasphemy on 27 November 1841 and imprisoned for twelve months in January 1842. George Jacob Holyoake, the Owenite lecturer for Sheffield, defended Southwell in December 1841, in a lecture entitled "The spirit of Bonner in the Disciples of Jesus," for which he was rebuked by the Owenite central board. Nevertheless, Holyoake took over the editorship of the Oracle from number eight (dated 12 February 1842) (according to Royle, Chilton edited number five but, preferring to remain in the background, delayed the next issue after Southwell's imprisonment until a new editor was found), moving the editorial office from Bristol to Sheffield, and changing publisher to Henry Hetherington.

=== Holyoake prosecuted for blasphemy ===
Holyoake's approach was more moderate than Southwell's, advocating a compromise for the Owenite movement whereby socialism and religion would be separated by setting up separate discussion classes on theological subjects. However, on 24 May 1842, Holyoake delivered a lecture on Home Colonisation in Cheltenham, during which he answered a question from the audience (it was asked by local preacher) about God's place in a socialist community:

He made some remarks about Education and said 'for his part he thought the people of this Country ought not to have any religion, they were too poor,' he said 'for my part I am of no religion at all' he said 'those that professed religion were worshippers of Mammon' 'for my part I don't believe there is such a thing as a God' he said when he was speaking of the people of this Country being too poor – 'If I could have my way I would place the Deity on half-pay as the Government of this Country did the subaltern officers'.

Holyoake was arrested for blasphemy on 2 June, on a return visit to Cheltenham. He was released on bail on 18 June and tried on 14 August. He was sentenced to six months imprisonment in Gloucester jail. George Adams (who was not an atheist) was sentenced to one month on the same day for selling the Oracle, number 25.

In June or July 1842, the editorial office moved from Sheffield to 8 Holywell Street, London, and at the end of August, Holyoake's name disappeared from the front page.

In June 1842, an Anti-Persecution Union (APU) was formed to defend Southwell and Holyoake, as well as George Adams and his wife Harriet (arrested but not prosecuted for selling Oracle number 4). It arose from Lambeth socialist Maltus Questell Ryall's initiative in organizing a defense fund for Southwell in early 1842, writing to Holyoake for support (Holyoake was facing his own legal problems). The APU, aiming to "assert and maintain the right of free discussion, and to protect and defend the victims of intolerance and bigotry" was run from Holywell Street. Ryall was secretary and James Watson was treasurer.

Thomas Paterson took over as editor from number 37, dated 3 September 1842, with assistance from Maltus Ryall (according to Royle, Ryall was the Oracle's business manager. He died on 11 February 1846, aged 37).

=== Paterson prosecuted for blasphemy ===
Paterson was imprisoned for one month in January 1843 for "displaying obscene and blasphemous literature in the window of the Oracle office in Holywell Street; and for fifteen months in November 1843 for selling blasphemous publications in Edinburgh. The masthead of the Oracle began to look like a police gazette."

Paterson "had the bluster of Southwell but not his ability, and the quality and circulation of the Oracle declined rapidly. Ryall did not have Holyoake's business abilities, and Chilton continued only behind the scenes." There were difficulties in distributing the Oracle, which was unstamped . Only a donation of £40 from William John Birch enabled the second volume of the Oracle (Nov. 1842–) to appear.

Paterson's last issue as editor was 3 June 1843.

=== Southwell abandons the Oracle ===
Southwell was released from prison in February 1843 but refused to resume the editorship of the Oracle. According to Royle (1974, p. 87.), this was "partly because he did not want to be made responsible for the debt it had accumulated under the management of Paterson and Ryall, but mainly because he had changed his mind about the value of the tone which he had originally given to the paper and which Paterson had maintained." Instead, he started a new paper, the Investigator, which closed in October 1843.

=== The Movement ===
On the closure of the Oracle, Holyoake founded the moderate Movement, and anti-persecution gazette, to which Chilton was a contributor. It lasted until 1845.

== Bibliography ==
- Holyoake, George Jacob (1906). Sixty Years of an Agitator's Life. 6th impression. London: T. Fisher Unwin.
- Royle, Edward (1974). Victorian Infidels: the origins of the British secularist movement, 1791–1866. Manchester UP online
- Royle, Edward (ed.) (1976). The Infidel Tradition: from Paine to Bradlaugh. London: Macmillan.
- Stein, Gordon (1985). "Southwell, Charles." The Encyclopedia of Unbelief, Vol. II, pp. 636–637. Buffalo, New York: Prometheus Books.
