= Shorthampton =

Hamlet in Oxfordshire, England

Coordinates: 51.879°N 1.525°W

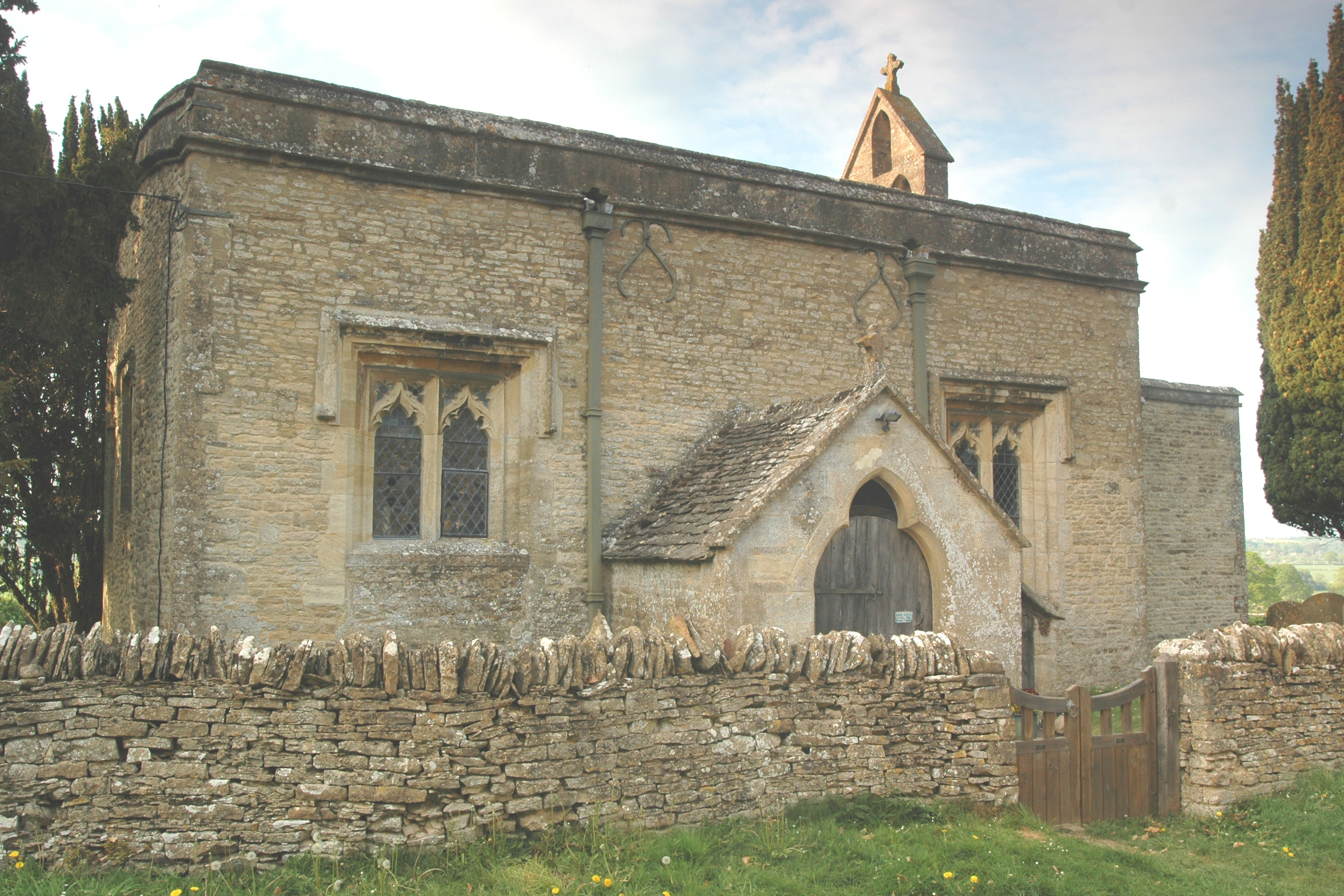
- All Saints' parish church

- Location within Oxfordshire
- OS grid reference: SP3320
- Civil parish: Chilson
- District: West Oxfordshire
- Shire county: Oxfordshire
- Region: South East
- Country: England
- Sovereign state: United Kingdom
- Post town: Chipping Norton
- Postcode district: OX7
- Police: Thames Valley
- Fire: Oxfordshire
- Ambulance: South Central
- UK Parliament: Witney

Shorthampton is a hamlet in Chilson civil parish about 2 miles (3 km) west of Charlbury, in Oxfordshire, England. The oldest parts of the Church of England parish church of All Saints are Norman, and a round-headed lancet window from this period survives in the north wall of the nave. The present chancel arch is small and was built in the 13th or 14th century. Most of the current windows are Perpendicular Gothic. All Saints' has box pews that were added in the 18th century and a south porch that was built in the 19th century. All Saints' contains several 15th century wall paintings including a rare one of the "Miracle of the Clay Birds" from the Infancy Gospel of Thomas and another of Saint Zita. All Saints' is a Grade II* listed building. All Saints' is part of the Benefice of Charlbury with Shorthampton. Most church services are now held at the parish church of St Mary the Virgin, Charlbury.

== Sources and further reading ==
- Long, E.T. (1972). "Medieval Wall Paintings in Oxfordshire Churches". Oxoniensia. XXXVII. Oxfordshire Architectural and Historical Society.
- Sherwood, Jennifer; Pevsner, Nikolaus (1974). Oxfordshire. The Buildings of England. Harmondsworth: Penguin Books. p. 763. ISBN 0-14-071045-0.
