= Emma Martin (socialist) =

English writer

- Born: Emma Bullock; 1811/1812; Bristol, England
- Died: 8 October 1851 (aged 38–40); Finchley Common, England
- Occupations: Author, activist
- Movement: Owenism
- Spouse: Isaac Luther Martin
- Partner: Joshua Hopkins
- Children: 3

Emma Martin (née Bullock; 1811/1812 – 8 October 1851) was a British writer, socialist and free thinker. She is known for her public speaking on behalf of socialism and Owenism.

== Early life ==
Emma Bullock was born in Bristol, fourth child of Hannah (née Jones) and William Bullock. Her mother's family owned a tea dealing business in Bristol and her father was a cooper, dying when she was very young. She moved to Clifton with her mother and stepfather, John Gwyn. At seventeen, she joined the radical Particular Baptists. She married Isaac Luther Martin in 1831 and together they had three daughters. In 1830, aged around eighteen, she set up a ladies' seminary and later a ladies' boarding-school which ran for a number of years. She became editor of the Bristol Literary Magazine in 1835.

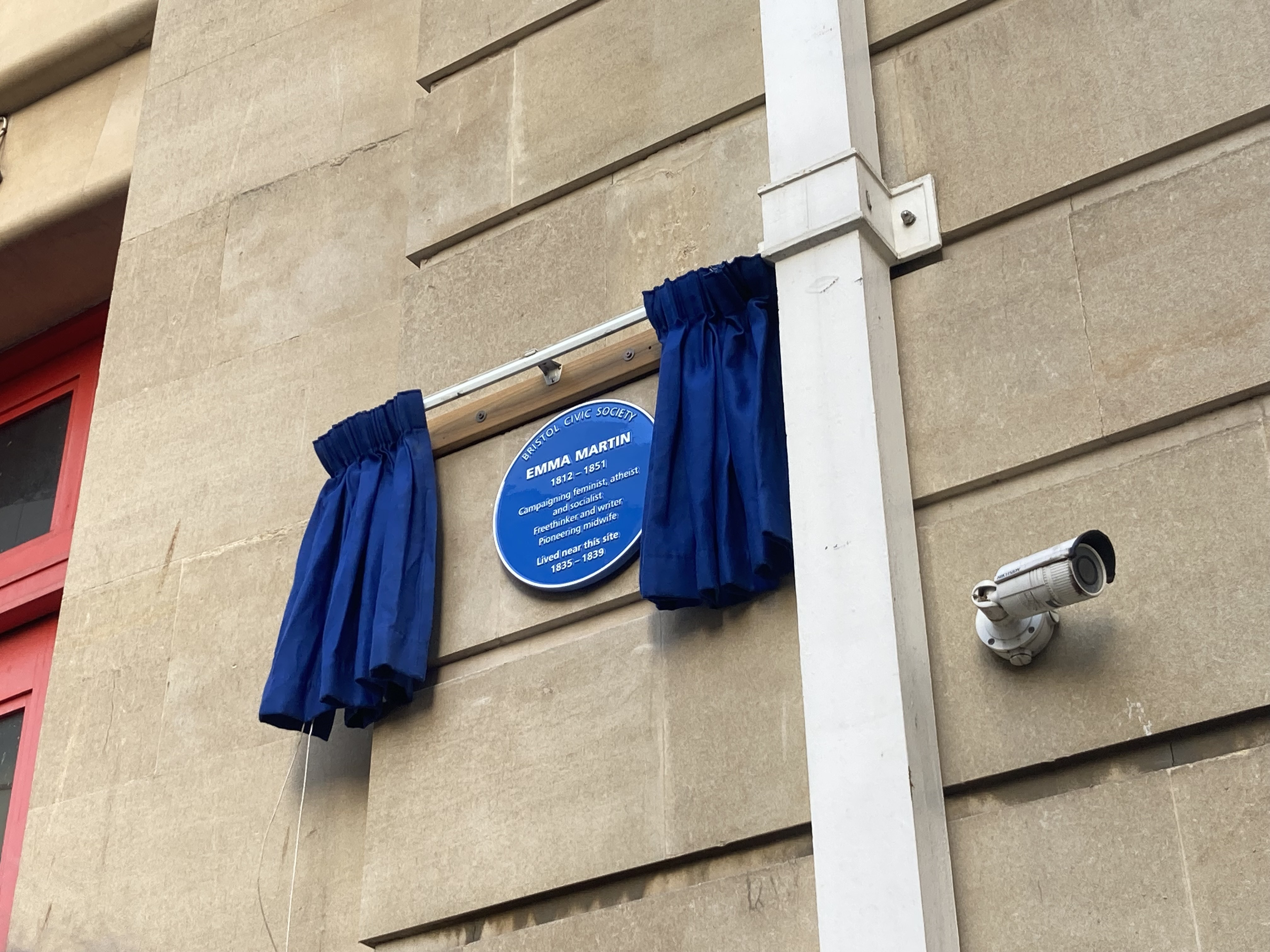
Plaque at 9 Bridewell Street, Bristol

Isaac Martin was, however, "a husband … whose company it was a humiliation to endure" (Holyoake, 4), and in the years after their marriage, despite all her religious and educational activities, Emma Martin became miserable and restless.

She heard the co-operative pioneer Alexander Campbell (1796–1870) in 1839 and he caused her to support the socialist Owenite points of view. At the time Campbell, was known as Robert Owen's "principal Scottish disciple". However, Martin rejected the socialist view that religion was not important. Martin challenged this idea and used her own beliefs to challenge the secular approach. However, it was Martin who was eventually persuaded.

== Owenite ==
Martin left her husband and rejected his faith, instead taking up the Owenite cause. In 1840, she was in discussions with James Pierrepont Greaves, who was trying to make Owenism less secular. By 1841, she addressed the Owenite annual conference, where her views on women's rights were received. She spoke of the freedom that Socialism might bring women by giving them financial independence.

Martin was touring the country and speaking publicly to thousands. She had to leave her daughters with friends and this must have put a strain on her financially. Martin was stoned by opponents and she could find crowds that were either attracted or there to object to her atheism. There was a realistic likelihood that she could be imprisoned for blasphemy and she formed an organisation with George Jacob Holyoake to mitigate this risk. However, she was taken to court, but unlike Holyoake, she was never convicted.

== Midwifery ==
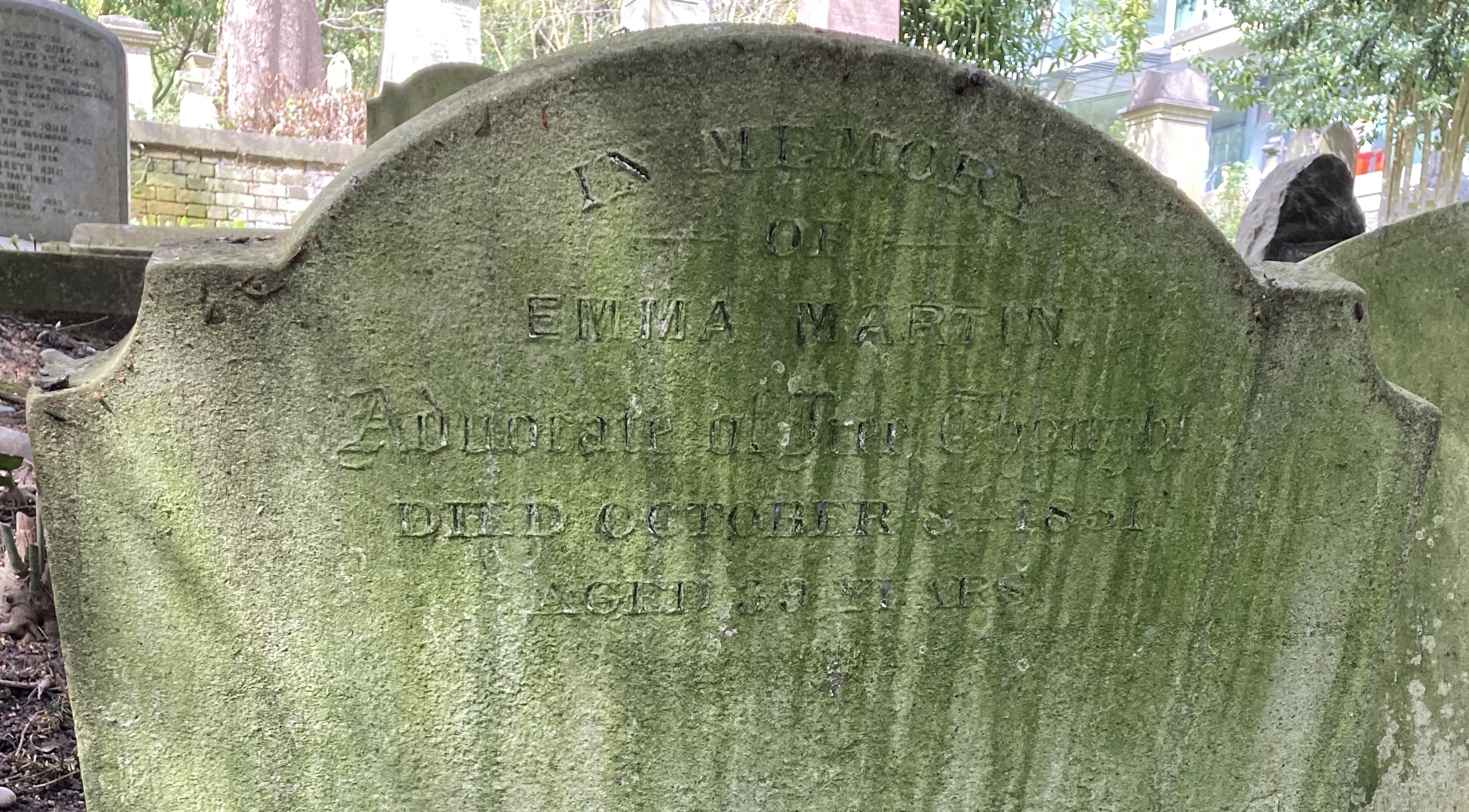
Grave of Emma Martin in Highgate Cemetery

In 1845, Martin withdrew from public speaking and became a midwife. She began living with engineer Joshua Hopkins (d. 1852) in 1845 and had her fourth daughter in 1847, as well as graduating in midwifery. Her atheism caused her to be denied hospital positions so she practiced independently from the family home and shop at 100 Long Acre, Covent Garden, London. Her daughters ran a surgical bandage shop from the same address. Martin also gave lectures to women in gynaecology and midwifery, and may have offered contraceptive advice.

Emma Martin died of tuberculosis in Finchley Common in 1851, and is buried in Highgate Cemetery. She died an atheist. Holyoake, who had spoken at her funeral, published The Last Days of Emma Martin: Advocate of Freethought the following year.

== Work ==
- Religion Superseded, 1844
- Baptism, A Pagan Rite, 1844
- Tracts for the People, 1844
- The Bible No Revelation (1845?)
- Punishment of Death?
- A Miniature Treatise of some of the Most Common Female Complaints, 1848

== Commemoration ==
A blue plaque in Emma Martin's memory was unveiled in Bristol on 23 February 2023 on the wall of the YMCA on Bridewell Street, the site of her home in the city. This followed a successful campaign led by Bristol Humanists.

== See also ==
- Works by or about Emma Martin at Wikisource
