= Sardar Government Museum =

Museum in Rajasthan, India

Sardar Government Museum, Jodhpur
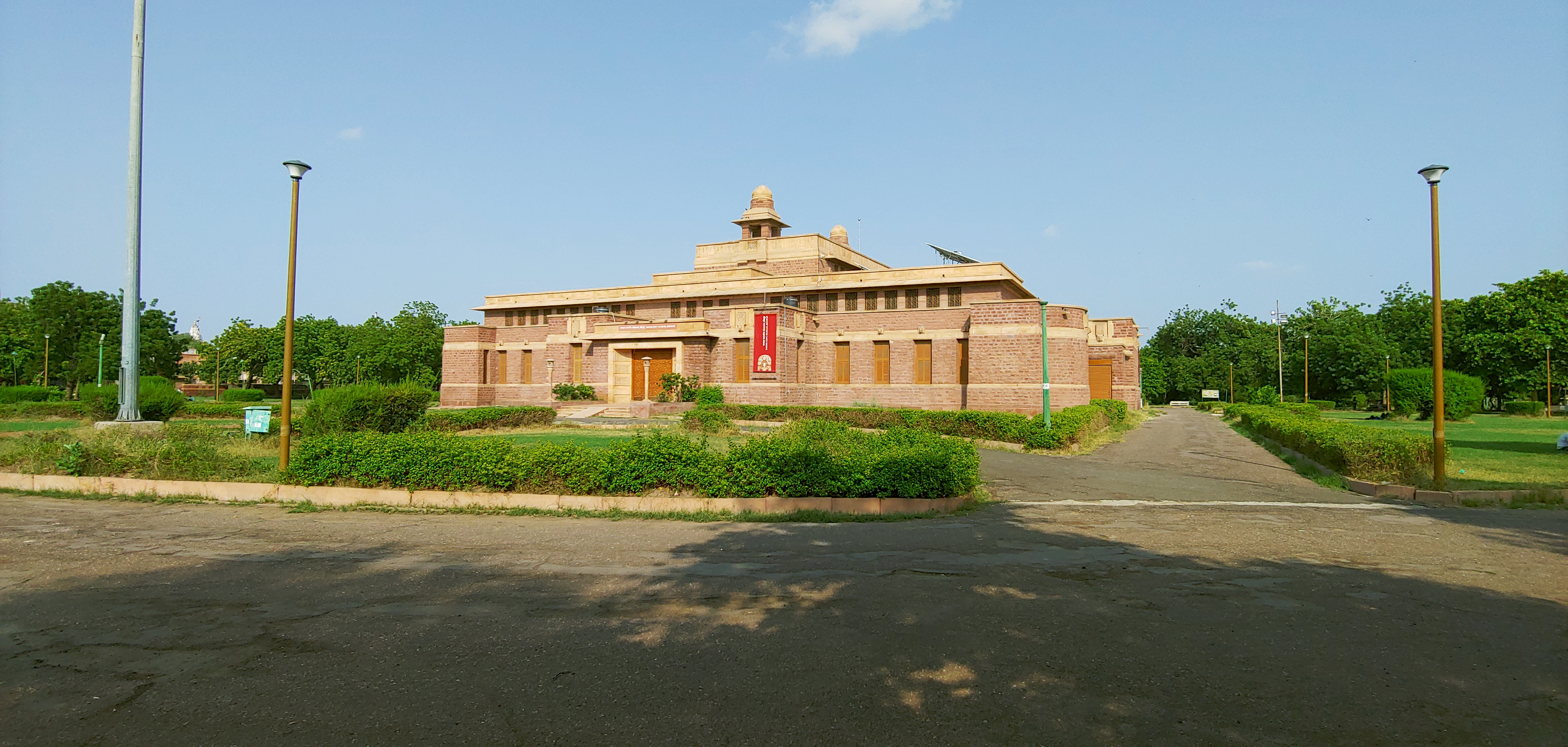
- Façade of Sardar Government Museum
- Established: 1909; 17 March 1936; 90 years ago as a museum
- Location: Public Park (Ummed Bagh); Jodhpur, Rajasthan, India
- Coordinates: 26.2918°N 73.0323°E
- Type: Archaeology museum Art museum
- Architect: Henry Vaughan Lanchester
- Website: Official site

The Sardar Government Museum (also known as Jodhpur Government Museum, Jodhpur State Museum or Museum Jodhpur) is located in Public Park (Ummed Bagh), Jodhpur, Rajasthan, India. The museum is named in memory of Maharaja Sardar Singh, a ruler of Jodhpur from 1895 to 1911. It was constructed under the reign of his son, Maharaja Umed Singh. It was built by Henry Vaughan Lanchester in 1909 and formally opened to the public on 17 March, 1936. The area of the museum is approx. 18,000 sq.ft. On 22 June 2018, the re-planned museum was inaugurated by Smt. Vasundhara Raje, the Chief Minister of Rajasthan.

== History ==
The history of Sardar Museum began in 1909 when Lord Kitchener visited Jodhpur. For his welcome the ruler of Jodhpur had arranged an exhibition. The exhibition showcased indigenous art and crafts and exquisite specimens of archaeological artefacts and Marawari painting. Many numismatic finds and epistolary exchanges with Jain monks were also part of this exhibition. This small collection became the nucleus around which Sardar museum evolved. Historian Pandit Bisheshwar Nath Reu was sought guidance to develop this collection. The collection opened as a modest museum in 1914 in the Suesagar Gardens. Reu made considerable effort and many notable objects were added and the museum collection became remarkable. In 1916, British Government of India also gave recognition to this museum and it was named Sardar Museum and was placed in a majestic building in Ummed Bagh. Seth Ramkumar Manganiram Bangur of Didwana was instrumental in this effort. The building was erected with the assistance of a business house, the Bangur Seth family. The mission of the museum was recognised as public education and the new museum was inaugurated by British Viceroy, Lord Wellington on 17 March 1936.

== Galleries ==
The various galleries of the museum are:

- General Gallery
- Animal gallery
- Industrial Section - I
- Armoury Section
- Sculpture Section
- Industrial Section - II
- Historical Section
- Mahaveer Section

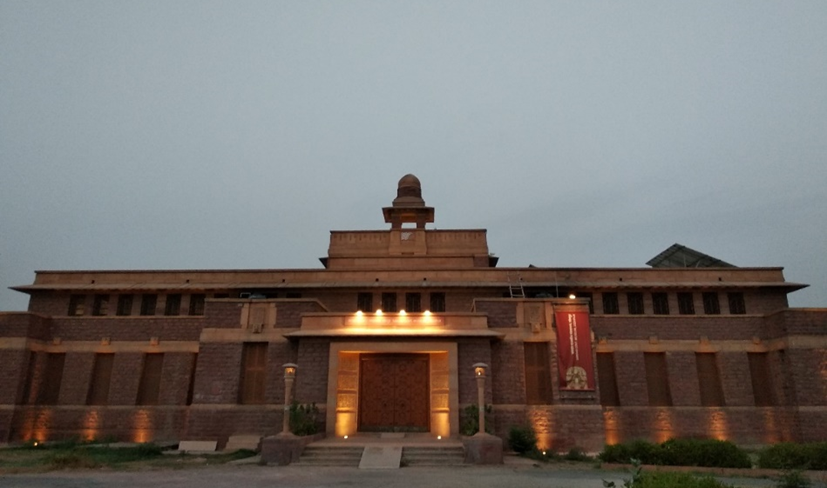

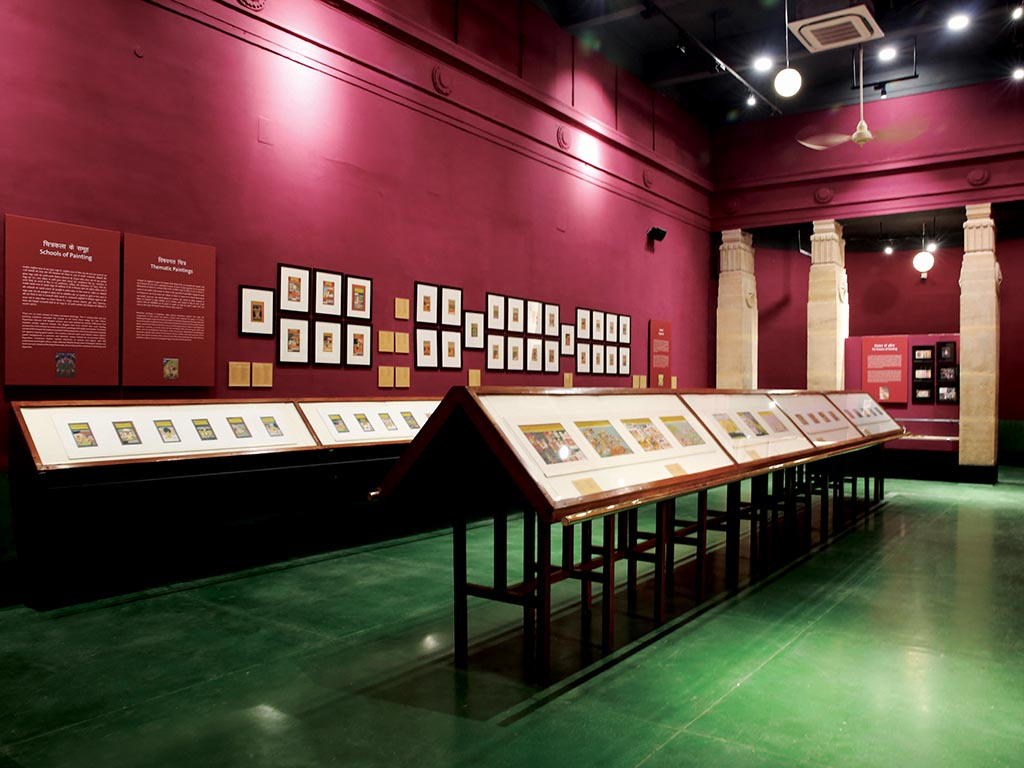

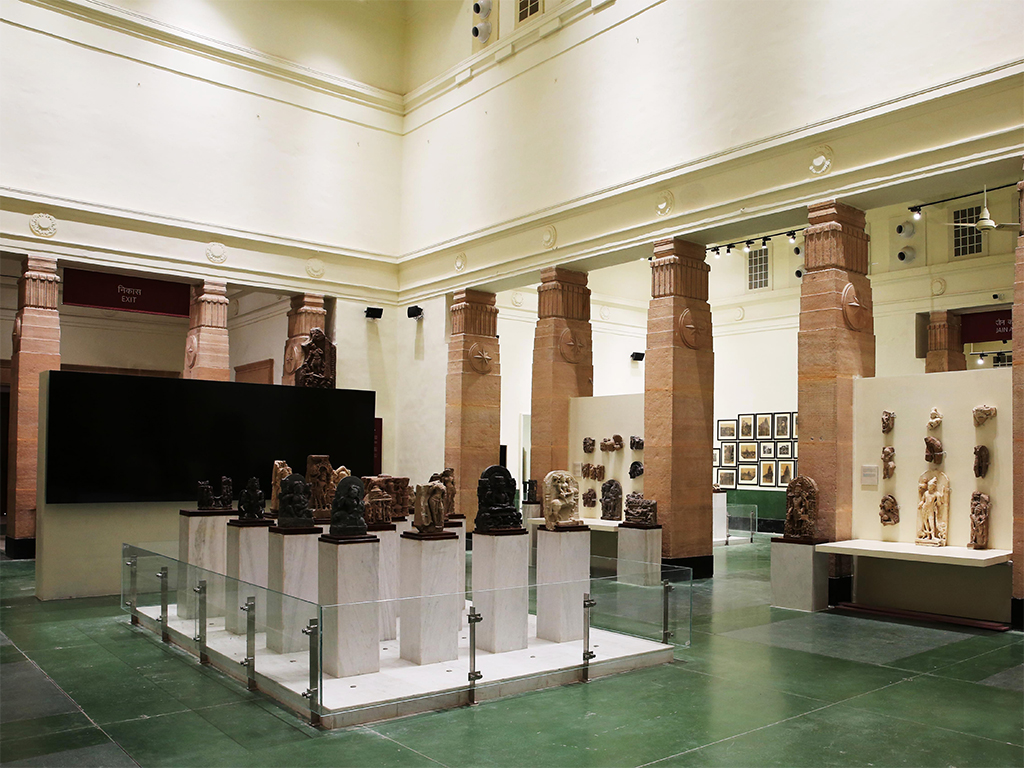

== Collection ==
The current collection consist of:

- 397 stone sculptures
- 10 inscriptions
- 1951 miniature paintings
- 12 terracotta
- 32 metallic objects
- 178 arms
- 111,703 coins
- 4107 miscellaneous objects

Some outstanding objects in the collection are - a unique hoard of copper objects excavated from Kurda in Nagaur district, and two toranas, gateways, pillars from Mandor, which are the earliest examples of Gupta art from the region.The museum is divided into many sections, mainly the archaeological, armory, art and craft and historical sections. It is particularly rich in weapons, textiles, miniature portraits and local arts and crafts.

The Toranastambh or ornamental pillars originally from Mandor belong to Gupta era and indicate their influence in the region. One such pillar, belonging to 4t century CE, depicts Krishna Leela. Krishna is shoen in five activities in five panels carved in low relief such as Krishna lifting the Govardhana Parvat or stealing butter from his mother yashoda. The pillar is an evidence of popularity of devotion to Krishna in religious life of the people. Vishnu images indicate the sway of vaishnavism while Jain artifacts are also prolific illustrating the acceptance and popularity of Jainism.

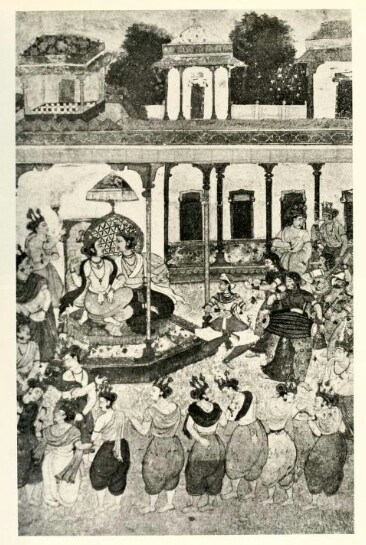
Arjuna with Indra

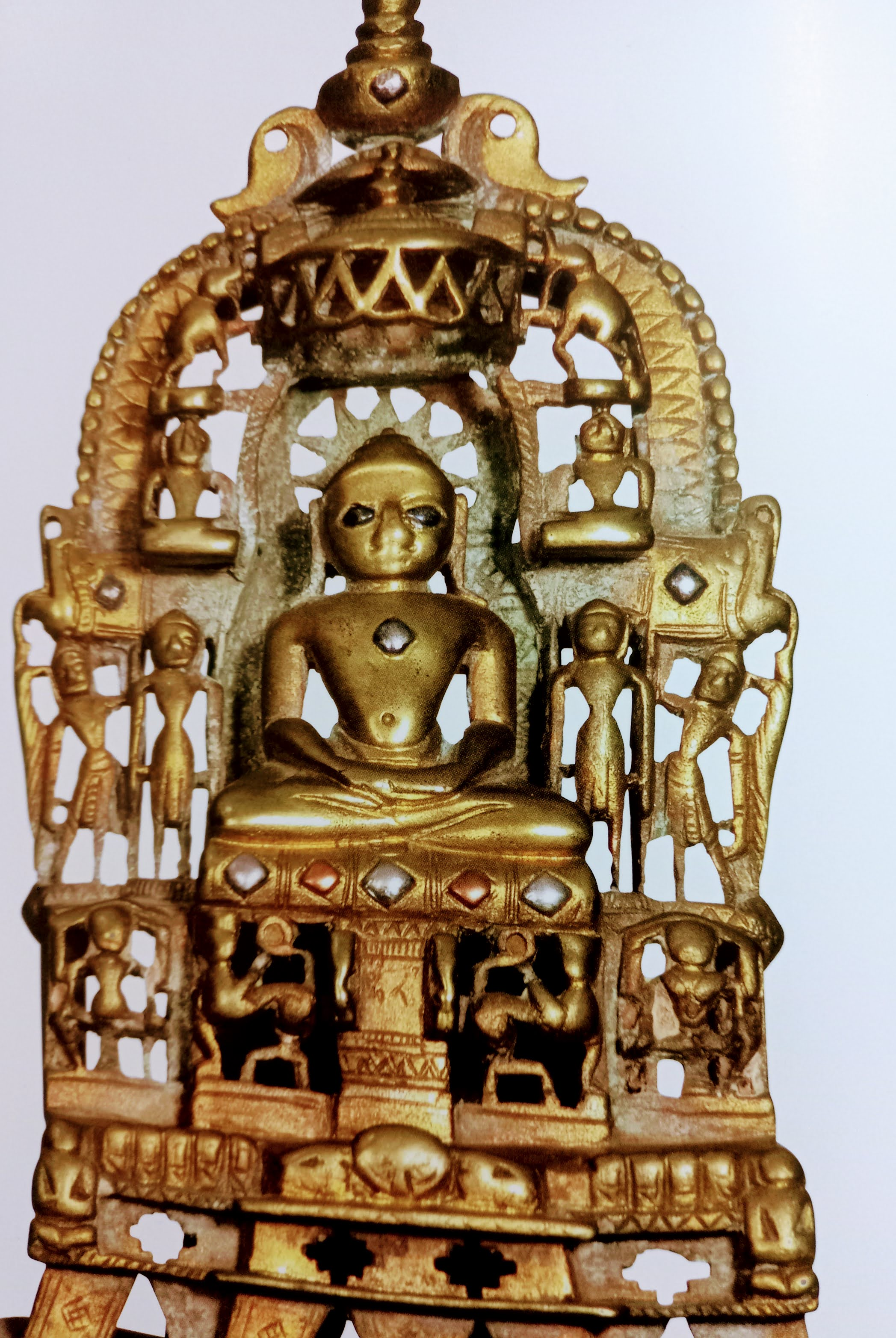
Brass Jain Monk, 15th Century

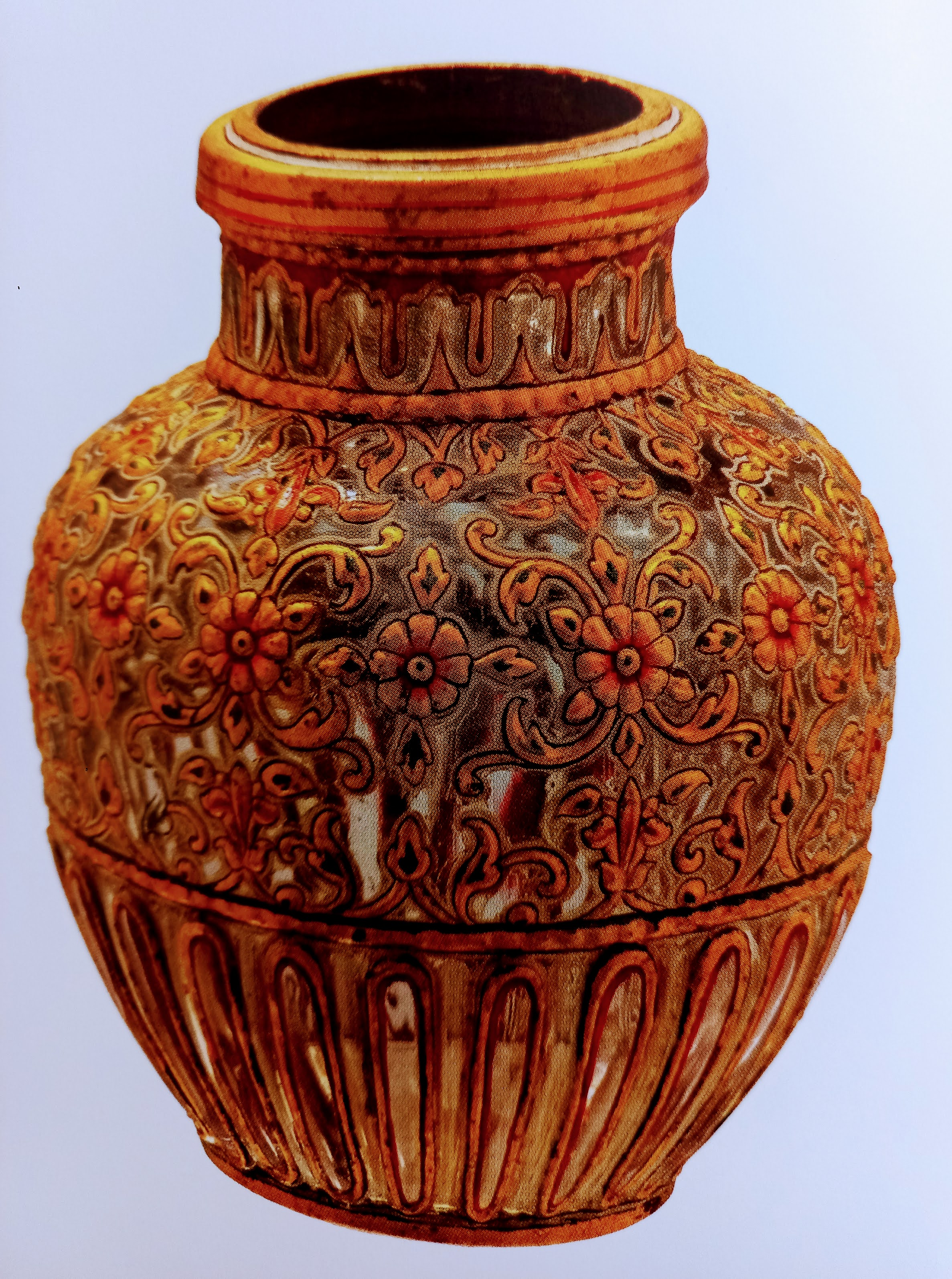
Decorative Art Glass Pot, Jodhpur

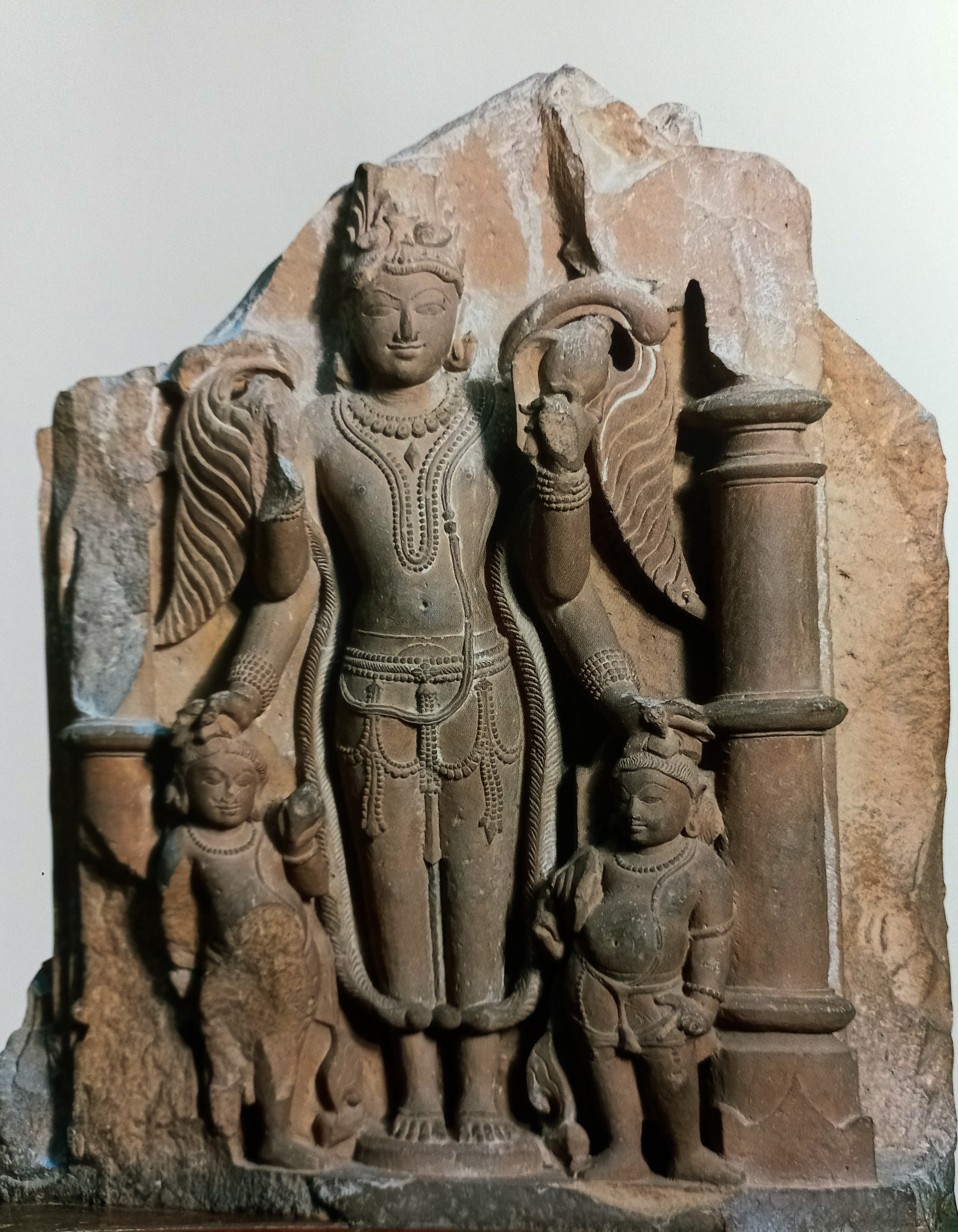
Vishnu, Kiradu, 12th century
