= A. N. Jani =

Indian scholar and indologist (1921–2003)

- Born: Arunoday Natvarlal Jani; 20 November 1921; Baroda, British India
- Died: 16 May 2003 (aged 81)
- Occupations: Scholar and Indologist
- Writing career
- Language: Gujarati, English
- Notable work: A Critical Study of Sriharsha's Naishadhiyacharitam (1957)
- Notable awards: Mahamahopadhyaya (1982)

Arunoday Natvarlal Jani (20 November 1921 – 16 May 2003), known as A. N. Jani, was a Gujarati and Sanskrit scholar, and Indologist from India.

== Biography ==
A. N. Jani was born on 20 November 1921 in Baroda, British India. He completed his MA in 1946, and received PhD in 1954 from the Bombay University. He wrote his doctoral dissertation on the Naiṣadhīyacaritam, an epic poem written by 12th century Sanskrit poet Shriharsha. In 1962, he studied Diploma in German from the M. S. University, and received Certificate in French in 1964 from the same university. He worked as a professor and later head of the department of Sanskrit at M. S. University during 1967–1980. He was appointed a director of Oriental Institute, Baroda during 1975–1981.

He cultivated interest in the different school of Indian philosophy from his professor G. H. Bhatt. Among Jani's notable students include S. N. Pendse, who studied his BA under Jani.

Jani died on 16 May 2003. His son Jaydev Jani, known as Rasaraja, was a poet.

== Works ==
List of selected publications by A. N. Jani:

- A Critical Study of Sriharsha's Naishadhiyacharitam (1957)
- Kalikapurana (1972) (edited with Gujarati translation)
- Sriharsha (1996) (on the life and works of Sanskrit poet Shriharsha)
- Saptasati (edited with Gujarati translation)

== Awards ==
In 1982, he was awarded the title of Mahamahopadhyaya by the Government of India.

== See also ==
- List of Gujarati-language writers
