= Pullela =

Pullela (Telugu: పుల్లెల) is a Telugu surname. Notable people with the surname include:

- Pullela Gopichand (born 1973), Indian badminton player
- Pullella Sriramachandrudu (1927–2015), Indian scholar
