= Constance E. Plumptre =

English writer, philosopher, and historian

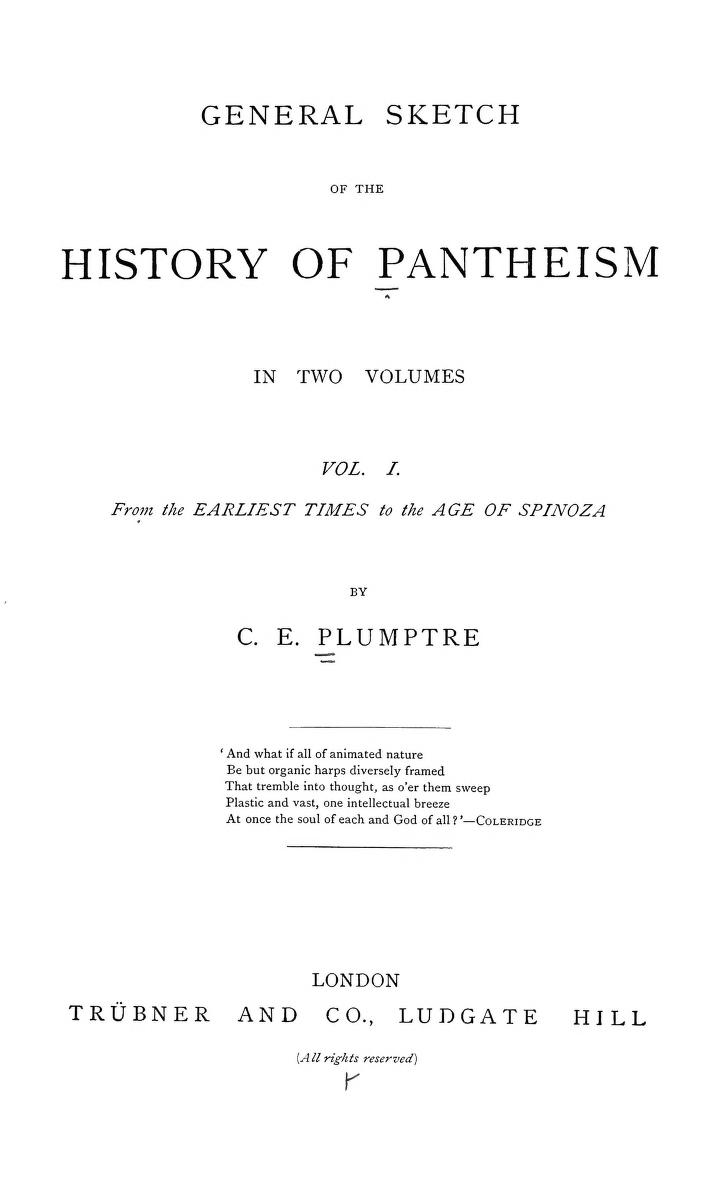
- Born: Constance Eliza Maria Fanny Plumptre; 1848; Kensington, London
- Died: 1929 (aged 80–81); London
- Occupations: Writer, philosopher
- Years active: 1878–1902
- Notable work: General Sketch of the History of Pantheism (1878); Studies in Little-Known Subjects (1898)

Constance E. Plumptre (1848–1929) was a writer, philosopher, and historian of religion. Her 1878 work, General Sketch of the History of Pantheism, has been described as 'one of the most significant histories of philosophy ever written'.

== Life ==
Constance Eliza Maria Fanny Plumptre was born in Kensington, London in 1848, the daughter of barrister Charles J. Plumptre, and christened at St James' Church, Norlands in Notting Hill. The dedication of her 1888 work Natural Causation, thanking her father for being 'unfailing in his encouragement and sympathy' and for his 'interest' in her earlier works, suggests that Plumptre's family supported her writing.

Described as a 'perceptive thinker and author', Plumptre wrote widely on philosophy and religion, 'deliberately seeking out and championing persecuted and obscure thinkers of the past such as Giordano Bruno and Lucilio Vanini.' Her General Sketch of the History of Pantheism, was initially published anonymously, only later reprinted using her name. It has been described as providing 'an erudite but accessible introduction to Oriental, Greek and modern Pantheism'. Of Vanini, and other freethinkers who suffered persecution for their unorthodoxy, she wrote:

The wonder was, not that men like Servetus or Vanini should have momentarily yielded to the temptation of denial or equivocation, but that the love of knowledge should have been sufficiently strong to render them courageous enough to prosecute it at all.

Her only work of fiction was a historical novel, Giordano Bruno (1884), about the Renaissance philosopher and mathematician burned for heresy in 1600. Frederick James Gould, in his Chats with Pioneers of Modern Thought, published in 1898, wrote of it that 'all the ascertained facts of his career are exposed with sufficient interweaving of fiction to render the story of his life eminently readable'.

Plumptre died on 4 January 1929 in St John's Wood. Her last publication was an essay 'On the Neglected Centenary of Harriet Martineau', which appeared in the Westminster Review in December 1902.

== Beliefs ==
Plumptre defended the position of agnosticism as the logical result of careful inquiry into the truths of various systems of belief:

If after devoting our best energies and highest endeavours to the investigation of the arguments of Monotheism, Dualism, Polytheism, Pantheism, and Atheism, we find none entirely convincing, there is no cowardice involved in the admission. On the contrary, it becomes our highest duty to confess that all our labour has been without fruit or reward. Though we have fervently sought we have failed to find. We are sceptics or agnostics, and recognise the fact that, even should one or other of these five interpretations of the mystery of existence be accepted as its true solution it is but a proximate solution and thus but removes the essential mystery but a step further back.

== Works ==
- General sketch of the history of pantheism (1878)
- General Sketch of the History of Pantheism, Volume 2, From the Age of Spinoza to the Commencement of the Nineteenth century (1879)
- Giordano Bruno: a tale of the sixteenth century (1884)
- Natural causation; an essay in four parts (1888)
- Studies in little-known subjects (1898)
- On the progress of liberty of thought during Queen Victoria's reign (1902)
