= Satya Vrat Shastri =

Indian Sanskrit scholar (1930–2021)

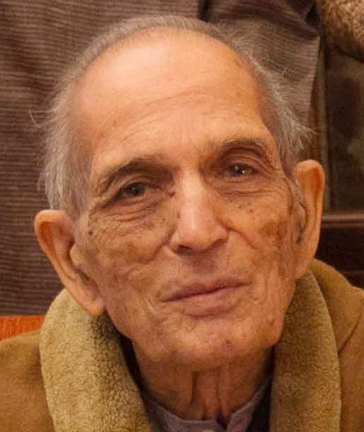
- Shastri in 2013
- Born: 29 September 1930
- Died: 14 November 2021 (aged 91)
- Education: Punjab University, Banaras Hindu University
- Occupations: Scholar, academic, poet, literary critic
- Writing career
- Genre: Sanskrit
- Notable awards: 1968: Sahitya Akademi Award; 2006: Jnanpith Award
- Website: satyavrat-shastri.net

Satya Vrat Shastri (29 September 1930 – 14 November 2021) was an Indian Sanskrit scholar, writer, grammarian and poet. He wrote three Mahakavyas, three Khandakavyas, one Prabandhakavyas and one Patrakavya and five works in critical writing in Sanskrit. His important works are Ramakirtimahakavyam, Brahattaram Bharatam, Sribodhisattvacharitam, Vaidika Vyakarana, Sarmanyadesah Sutram Vibhati, and "Discovery of Sanskrit Treasures" in seven volumes.

He was an honorary professor at the Special Centre for Sanskrit Studies (now known as the School of Sanskrit and Indic Studies (SSIS), Jawaharlal Nehru University, New Delhi. He was the Head of the Department of Sanskrit and the Dean of the Faculty of Arts at the University of Delhi, where he was the Pandit Manmohan Nath Dar Professor of Sanskrit (1970–1995).

During his career he won many national and international awards, including, the Sahitya Akademi Award for Sanskrit, given by Sahitya Akademi, India's National Academy of Letters, in 1968 for his poetry work, Srigurugovindasimhacharitam, then in 2006, he became the first recipient of the Jnanpith award in Sanskrit language (conferred in 2009 by Thailand's Princess Maha Chakri Sirindhorn).

== Education ==
Shastri received his early education under his father, Shri Charu Deva Shastri, a renowned scholar. Thereafter, he moved to Varanasi, where he studied under Shukdev Jha and Siddheshwar Varma.

He received his B.A. Hons. and MA in Sanskrit from the Punjab University, and his PhD from the Banaras Hindu University.

== Career ==
He joined the University of Delhi soon after, where for the next forty years of his teaching career, he held important positions as the Head of the Department of Sanskrit, and the Dean of the Faculty of Arts. Satya Vrat Shastri was also the Vice-Chancellor of Shri Jagannath Sanskrit University, Puri, Orissa, and a visiting professor at the Chulalongkorn and Silpakorn Universities in Bangkok, as well as the Northeast Buddhist University, Nongkhai, Thailand, the University of Tübingen, Tübingen, Germany, the Catholic University, Leuven, Belgium, and the University of Alberta, Edmonton, Canada. He was a Visiting Professor of Sanskrit and in his class, among other students there was also Thailand's Princess Maha Chakri Sirindhorn who studied a minor paper on Sanskrit and received her M.A. in Oriental Epigraphy in 1979 at Silpakorn University [1977–1979].

Satya Vrat Shastri wrote many important poetic works in Sanskrit, the most important being his rendition from Royal Thai into Sanskrit, of the Thai version of the Ramayana, viz., Sri-rama-kirti-maha-kavyam, and with a foreword by the Princess of Thailand. Later research projects were the Sanskrit inscriptions and Hindu temples in Thailand, Kalidasa Studies, a critical edition of the Yogavasishtha, the Sanskritic vocabulary of South East Asia, and the Rama story in South East Asia.

In 2009, he became the first Sanskrit poet to win the (2006) Jnanpith award, for his contributions to the enrichment of the language, and conferred by his former disciple, Princess of Thailand, Maha Chakri Sirindhon.

== Honors and awards ==
=== International ===
- Honour from Royal Nepal Academy, Kathmandu, 1979.
- Medallion of Honour from the Catholic University, Leuven, Belgium, 1985.
- Elected Fellow, International Institute of Indian Studies, Ottawa, Canada.
- Doctorate Honoris Causa from the Silpakorn University, Bangkok, Thailand, 1993.
- Honour: “Autorita Academische Italiano Straniere”. The Civil and Academic Authority of Italy for Foreigners, 1994.
- Kalidasa Award from the International Institute of Indian Studies, Ottawa, Canada, 1994.
- Special Award from Centro Pimontese di Studi Sui Medio ed Estremo Oriente (CESMEO), Torino, Italy, 1995.
- Honour from Gaja Madah University, Yogyakarta, Indonesia, 1995.
- Royal Decoration “Most Admirable Order of the Direkgunabhorn" from His Majesty the King of Thailand, 1997.
- Doctorate Honoris Causa, from the University of Oradea, Oradea, Romania.
- Certificate of Excellence from the Spiru Haret University, Ramnicu-Valeca, Romania, 2001.
- Certificate of Excellence from the Biblioteca Judeteana"Antim Ivireanul" Valeca, Romania, 2001.
- Honour from Mihai Eminescu International Academy, Bucharest, Romania, 2001.
- "Outstanding Teacher and Writer" by Biblioteca Pedagogica Nationala 'I.C. Petrescu' and Biblioteca Indiana, Romania 2001
- Golden Prize from CESMEO, International Institute for Advanced Asian Studies, Torino, Italy, 2001.
- Elected Fellow, Accademia di Studi Mediterrani, Academy of Mediterranean Studies, Aggrigento, Italy.
- Conferred DOCTORATE HONORIS CAUSA by the University of Torino, Italy on 3 May 2012

=== National ===
- Sahitya Akademi Award, 1968 for Srigurugovindasimhacharitam (Poetry).
- Honour from Sahitya Kala Parishad, Delhi Administration, Delhi, 1974.
- Honour from Delhi Sikh Gurudwara Board, 1974.
- U.G.C. National Lecturer, 1983.
- President of India Certificate of Honour, 1985.
- Shiromani Sanskrit Sahityakar Award, Govt. of Punjab, 1985.
- Visista Sanskrit Sahitya Puraskara, Uttar Pradesh Sanskrit Academy, 1988.
- Gita Rana Puraskara, IX International Gita Conference, Delhi, 1991.
- Sanskrit Seva Sammana, Delhi Sanskrit Akademi, Delhi, 1992.
- Sanskrit Sahitya Paraskara, Bharatiya Bhasha Parishad, Kolkata, 1992.
- Indira Baharey Gold Medal, Tilak Maharashtra Vidyapeeth, Pune, 1992.
- Pandit Jagannatha Sanskrit Padya-racana Puraskara, Delhi Sanskrit Akademi, Delhi, 1993.
- Kalidasa Puraskara, Uttar Pradesh Sanskrit Academy, Lucknow, 1994.
- Pandita Kshama Row Puraskara, Row Dayal Trust, Mumbai, 1994.
- Vagbhusana title, Vanmaya-vimarsa, Delhi, 1994.
- Devavani-ratna Sammana, Devavani Parishad, New Delhi, 1994.
- First All India Sammana, Rajasthan Sanskrit Academy, Jaipur, 1995.
- Vachaspati Puraskara, K.K. Birla Foundation, New Delhi, 1995.
- Dayawati Modi Vishwa Sanskriti Sammana, Modi Kala Kala Bharati, New Delhi, 1995.
- Shastra-chudamani Award, Rashtriya Sanskrit Sansthan, New Delhi, 1996.
- Manasa Sammana, Tulasi Manasa Pratishthana, Madhya Pradesh and Tulasi Academy, Bhopal, 1997.
- All India Kalidasa Puraskara, Madhya Pradesh Sanskrit Academy, Bhopal, 1997.
- Honour from the Govt. of Maharashtra, 1998.
- Degree of Mahamahopadhyaya, Honoris Causa, Rashtriya Sanskrit Vidyapitha, Tirupati, 1999.
- Padma Shri, Govt. of India, 1999.
- Honour from Kurukshetra University, Kurukshetra, 1999.
- Honour from Delhi Sanskrit Akademi, Delhi, 1999.
- Degree of Vidyavachaspati, Honoris Causa, Gurukul Mahavidyalaya, Jwalapur, Haridwar, 1999.
- Honour from Mahamahopadhyaya Pandit Naval Kishore Kankar Seva Parishsad, Jaipur, 1999.
- Kalidasa Sammana, Kalidasa Samaroha, Ujjain, 2000.
- Title of Veda-shastra-visharada, Swami Vishvesh Tirtha, Adhokshaja Mutt, Udupi, Karnataka, 2002.
- Shrivani Alankarana, Ramakrishna Jaidayal Dalmiya Trust, Delhi, 2002.
- Degree of Vidyamartanda (D.Litt.), Honoris Causa, Gurukul Kangri University, Hardwar, 2002.
- Mahakavi Kalidasa Sanskrit Jivanavrati Rashtriya Sammana, Kavikulaguru Kalidasa Sanskrit Vishvavidyalaya, Nagpur, 2002.
- Honour from All India Oriental Conference, 43rd Session, Puri, 2003.
- Shrimati Chandrawati Joshi Sanskrit Bhasha Puraskara, Jnana Kalyana Datavya Nyasa, New Delhi, 2003.
- Vedanga Puraskara, Maharshi Sandipani Vedavidya Pratishthan, Ujjain, 2003.
- Acharya Umasvami Puraskara, Kundakunda Bharati, New Delhi, 2003.
- First International Himadri Uttaranchal Sanskrit Sammana, Uttaranchal Sanskrit Academy, Hardwar, 2004
- Dr. Shashibhanu Vidyalankar Rashtriya Puraskara, Dr. Shashibhanu Vidyalankar Dharmartha Trust, Hardwar, 2006.
- Jnanpith Award, Bharatiya Jnanpith, New Delhi, 2006.
- Degree of Vachaspati (D.Litt.), Honoris Causa, Shri Lal Bahadur Shastri Rashtriya Sanskrit Vidyapeetha, New Delhi, 2007.
- Life Time Achievement Award Vidyaratna, Purbanchal Academy of Oriental Studies, Kolkata, 2008.
- Elected General President, All India Oriental Conference, 45th Session, Tirupati, 2008.
- Sardar Patel Award, Sardar Vallabhabhai Patel Foundation, New Delhi, 2008.
- D. Litt. Degree Honoris Causa, Deccan College, Pune, 2009.
- Anuvadashri Puraskara, Bharatiya Anuvada Parishad, New Delhi, 2009.
- Prashant Murti Puraskara, Vimala Vidyashruta Sansthan, Jaipur, 2009
- Sri Chandrasekharendra Saraswati National Eminence Award, The South Indian Education Society, Mumbai, 2009.
- Vishva Bharati Puraskara, UP Sanskrit Sansthan, Lucknow, 2009
- Padma Bhushan, Govt of India, 2010
- General President, All India Oriental Conference, 45th Session, Tirupati, 2010
- Sanskrit Kaustubha Sammana, Bharatiya Vidya Bhavan, Delhi Kendra, New Delhi, 2010
- Distinguished Alumnus Award, Banaras Hindu University, Varanasi, 2010
- Mahamana Malaviya Smrti Alankarana Puraskara, Mahamana Mission, Varanasi Unit, Varanasi, 2010
- Srimadvidyabhaskara Sammana, Mahamandaleshvara Junapithadhishvara Avadheshananda Giri, Hardwar, 2010
- Sarasvati ke Varadaputra title, All India Sanskrit Prakashaka Sangha, Delhi, 2011
- Maharshi Valmiki Sammana, Delhi Sanskrit Academy, Delhi, 2011
- Dr. Gangadhar Bhatta Smrti Sammana, Rajaganga Charitable Trust, Jaipur, 2011
- Bharatiratnam Sammana, Lokabhasha Prachara Samiti, Bhubaneswar, 2011.
- Prajnana Gaurava Sammana by Gloryfest, Puri, Odisha, 2012.
- Saptarshi Sammana by Sandipani Vidya Niketana, Porbundar, Gujarat, 2012.
- Swami Brahmananda Memorial Vyasashree Award-2012 by Maharsi Vyasadeva National Research Institute, Rourkela, Odisha..
- Doctorate Honoris Causa, University of Torino, Torino, Italy, 2012.
- Rajata Sammana, Maharshi Sandipani Veda Vidya Pratishthan, Ujjain, 2012.
- Degree of Mahamahopadhyaya, Kavi Kulguru Kalidasa Sanskrit University, Rampek (Nagpur), 2012.
- Brihaspati Sammana, Kavi Kulguru Kalidasa Sanskrit University, Rampek (Nagpur), 2012.
- Mahamahimopadhyaya Sammana, Sanskrit Sahitya Academy, Cuttuck, Odisha, 2012.
- Honour Bharatashrih, Akhil Bhartiya Vidvat Parishad Varanasi, 2013.
- Fellow, Sahitya Akademi, New Delhi, 2013.
- Professor Emeritus, University of Delhi, 2013
- Vasundhara Ratna Samman, Award of Excellence, Respect Age International, New Delhi, 2013
- Chairman, 2nd Sanskrit Commission, Govt. of India, 2014.
- Rajaprabha Puraskar, Kunjunni Raja Academy of Indological Research (KAIR), Thrissur (Kerala), 2014.
- Distinguished Teacher Award from the University of Delhi, Delhi, 2014
- Sanskrit Gaurava Samman from All India Sanskrit Sahitya Sammelan New Delhi, 2014
- Bharatbhusan Award, Indian Institute of Oriental Heritage, Kolkata, 2014

== Academic writings ==
- Essays on Indology, Meharchand Lacchmandas, 1963,
- The Ramayana – A linguistic study with a foreword by Dr. Suniti Kumar Chatterjee and an introduction by Dr. Siddheshwar Varma, Munshiram Manoharlal, Delhi 1964,
- Vaidika Vyakarana (Hindi translation of A.A.Macdonell's "A Vedic Grammar for Students", Motilal Banarasidass, Delhi 1971,
- Studies in Sanskrit and Indian Culture in Thailand, Parimal Prakashan, Delhi 1982,
- Kalidasa in Modern Sanskrit Literature, Eastern Book Linkers, Delhi, 1991
- Subhasitasahasri (Thousand Pearls from Sanskrit Literature), Rashtriya Sanskrit Sansthan, New Delhi, 1998
- Studies in the Language and the Poetry of the Yogavasistha (In the Press).
- Sanskrit Inscriptions of Thailand, Vijaya Books, Delhi-32, India, 2013,
- Human Values: Definitions and Interpretations, BharatiyaVidya Mandir, Kolkata-700087 2013 – ISBN 978-81-89302-45-0
- Sanskrit Writings of European Scholars, Vijaya Books, Delhi-110032 2013 – ISBN 978-81-910948-3-1
- Hungary Kitni Dur Kitni Paas, Vijaya Books, Delhi, 2013.
- Caran Vai Madhu Vindati (An account of the foreign cultural travels)- Vijya Books, 2013.
- Canakyaniti (Hindi and English translations with introduction) – Bhartiya Vidya Mandir, Kolkata, 2013.
- Words for Human Values in Sanskrit : Definitions and Interpretations, Bhartiya Vidya Mandir, Kolkata, 2013
- Introducing Sanskrit Literature, Vijaya Books, Delhi, 2014.

== Literary writings ==
- Brhattaram Bharatam ( A Kavya in Sanskrit ) Sarasvati Susama, Journal of the Sampurnanand Sanskrit University, Varanasi, Vol. XII, No. 1, Samvat 2014
- Sribodhisattvacaritam (A Kavya in Sanskrit), First Ed. Self Publication, Delhi, Samvat 2017 (A.D. 1960) pages iv+ 120, Second Ed. Meharchand Lacchmandas, Delhi 1974,
- Srigurugovindasimhacharitam (A Kavya in Sanskrit) (With a foreword by Dr. V. Raghavan), First Ed. Guru Gobind Singh Foundation, Patiala, 1967, Second Ed. Sahitya Bhandar, Meerut, 1984,
- Sarmanyadesah Sutaram Vibhati (A Kavya in Sanskrit), Akhil Bharatiya Sanskrit Parishad, Lucknow, 1976
- Indira Gandhi-caritam (A Kavya in Sansktir), Bharatiya Vidya Prakashan, Delhi, 1976,
- Thaidesavilasam (A Kavya in Sanskrit) (With a foreword by Prof. Visudh Busyakul), Eastern Book Linkers, Delhi 1979
- Sriramakirtimahakavyam (A Kavya in Sanskrit) (with a foreword by Her Royal Highness Maha Chakri Sirindhorn, the Princess of Thailand), Moolamall Sachdev and Amarnath Sachdeva Foundations, Bangkok, First Ed. 1990, Second Ed. 1991, Third Ed. 1995.
- Patrakavyam (A Kavya in Sanskrit), Eastern Book Linkers, Delhi 1994
- New Experiments in Kalidasa (Plays), Eastern Book Linkers, Delhi 1994
- Chanakyaniti, Bharatiya Vidya Mandir, Kolkata, 2013, ISBN 978-81-89302-42-9
- Charan Vai Madhu Vindati (Sanskrit-Hindi), Vijaya Books, Delhi-110032, 2013 – ISBN 978-93-81480-30-4
- Bhavitavyanam Dvaranii Bhavanti Sarvatra, Autobiography in Sanskrit, Vijaya Books, Delhi, 2014
