= Siddheshwar Varma =

Indian linguist

- Born: 3 November 1887; Rawalpindi, Punjab, British India
- Died: 17 August 1985 (aged 97); Delhi, India
- Other name: Pindidas
- Occupations: Linguist; Phonetician; Writer; Scholar
- Known for: Linguistics
- Parent(s): Ram Dass Nanda; Jamana Devi
- Awards: Padma Bhushan; Presidential Certificate of Honour; GoJK Robe of Honor

Siddheshwar Varma (1887–1985) was an Indian linguist, phonetician, grammarian and scholar, known for his knowledge of over 30 languages. He was the secretary of the International Moral Education Congress for India (1923) and the author of such books as The Bhalesī dialect, A Glossary of the Khāsī : a north-western Himalayan dialect of Jammu and Kashmir, Siddha-Bhāratī; The rosary of Indology and Pahari dictionary of 27-north-western Himalayan dialects. The Government of India awarded him the third highest civilian honour of the Padma Bhushan, in 1957, for his contributions to literature and education.

== Biography ==
Siddheshwar Varma, originally named Pindidas, was born on 3 November 1887 at Rawalpindi in the erstwhile Punjab province of British India in a Khatri family to Ram Dass Nanda and Jamana Devi, and did his early schooling at various places in Punjab like Rawalpindi, Kamalpur, Jhelum, Gujranwala and Mianwali. His career started as private secretary to Raja Sir Nahar Singh, a post he took up after completing his master's degree in history. Simultaneously, he worked as a tutor to Prince Satrunjaya Singh, who would later become the Raja of the princely state of Bijwa (Oudh) but moved later to K. G. Hindu High School, Gujranwala as a teacher where he became the headmaster. Side by side, he continued his Sanskrit studies and when the job of a headmaster hindered his studies, he changed job once again by taking up the position as a lecturer at Govt. Gandhi Memorial Science College, Jammu (then known as Prince of Wales College). It was here he spent the rest of his service till his retirement; in between, he had a short stay of three years abroad for securing a DL degree.

While continuing his linguistic studies through his years in Jammu, Varma learned several Indian and foreign languages such as Hindi, Urdu, Punjabi, Tamil, French, Greek, Latin, Russian, Slavonic, German, Arabic, and Persian; he was reported to have learned 30 different languages. He was also associated with organizational activities and was the secretary of the Indian chapter of the International Moral Education Congress in 1923. He was among the scholars who assisted A. C. Woolner in founding the Linguistic Society of India in 1928 and was involved in the establishment of organizations like Association of Thinkers, Shabda Brahma Parishad, and Samabhava Mandal. He contributed to the recognition of Dogri language by the Sahitya Akademi and was the founder patron of Dogri Research Institute, Jammu, an institution founded in 1962 to promote the language.

Varma died on 17 August 1985, at the age of 97.

== Awards and honors ==
Varma was honored by the Government of India by including him in the 1957 Republic Day Honors list for the third highest award of the Padma Bhushan. His contributions to Indology earned him a Presidential Certificate of Honour in 1967 and the Punjabi University conferred the degree of Doctor of Literature on him the same year; he would also receive another honoris causa doctorate in 1982, this time from the University of Jammu. He was also honored by the Government of Jammu and Kashmir with a Robe of Honor. Vishveshvaranand Vishva Bandhu Institute of Sanskrit and Indological Studies of Panjab University published a two-volume work, Siddha Bharati, in 1978, in his honor.

== Selected bibliography ==
- Siddheshwar Varma (1929). Critical Studies In The Phonetic Observations Of Indian Grammarians. Royal Asiatic Society. ISBN 978-81-215-0366-2.
- Siddheshwar Varma (1935). Nasalization in Hindi Literary Works. S. Varma.
- Siddheshwar Varma (1948). The Bhalesī Dialect. Royal Asiatic Society of Bengal.
- Siddheshwar Varma (1950). Siddha-Bhāratī, Or, The Rosary of Indology: Being the Dr. Siddheshwar Varma Presentation Volume. V.V.R. Institute, P. & P. Organisation.
- Siddheshwar Varma (1957). The Shiūṭī Dialect of North-West Pahār̥ī.
- Siddheshwar Varma (1973). G.A. Grierson's Linguistic Survey of India: A Summary. Vishveshvaranand Vishva Bandhu Inst. of Sanskrit and Indological Studies, Panjab Univ.
- Siddheshwar Varma (1953). The Etymologies of Yāska. Vishveshvaranand Institute Publications.
- Siddheshwar Varma (1978). Pāṇini and Elision: Being an Analytical Study of Pāṇini's Sūtras on Lopa (elision) in Sanskrit. Vishveshvaranand Vishva Bandhu Institute of Sanskrit and Indological Studies, Panjab University.
- Siddheshwar Varma (1983). Ḍā. Siddheśvara Varmā abhinandana aṅka, 28, 29 Navambara 1981. Ḍogarī Risarca Insṭīcyūṭa.
- Siddheshwar Varma (1989). A Glossary of the Khāsī : a north-western Himalayan dialect of Jammu and Kashmir. Vishveshvaranand Vishva Bandhu Institute of Sanskrit and Indological Studies. p. 104. OCLC 27856970.

== See also ==
- Satya Vrat Shastri
- International Moral Education Congress
