= Jayamant Mishra =

Indian scholar (1925–2010)

Jaymant Mishra
- Born: 15 October 1925; India
- Died: 7 September 2010 (aged 84)
- Occupations: Sanskrit scholar, Maithili poet, academician
- Writing career
- Language: Sanskrit, Maithili
- Notable works: Mahamanavachampu, Kavita Kusumanjali, Mahakavi Vidyapati
- Notable awards: Mahamahopadhyaya, President Award, Kalidas Samman, Vanabhatta Award, Sahitya Akademi Award (1995)

Dr. Jaymant Mishra (15 October 1925 – 7 September 2010) was a renowned Sanskrit scholar of India. He was also a well-known Maithili poet. He had been awarded several prestigious honors including "Mahamahopadhyaya", President Award, "Kalidas Samman" and Vanabhatta award. He was awarded Sahitya Akademi Award in 1995. His major literary contributions were Mahamanavachampu in Sanskrit and Kavita Kusumanjali in Maithili — a compilation of Maithili poems, Mahakavi Vidyapati — a commentary of the legendary Maithili poet . He had also been one of the prominent academicians of the Bihar province of India. He served as the Vice Chancellor of K S D Sanskrit University (1985–1990).

Most of his literary works have a satirical literary tone which he uses to ridicule human vice and weakness — both on an individual and social level. His works surprise the readers with his progressive views despite the fact that his era was one of the darkest ages of parochialism and denominationalism.

== List of works ==
- Kavita Kusumanjali
- Mahakavi Vidyapati
