= Gustav Spiller =

British ethical writer (1864–1940)

Gustav Spiller (1864 - February 1940) was a Hungarian-born ethical and sociological writer who was active in Ethical Societies in the United Kingdom. He helped to organize the First Universal Races Congress in 1911.

== Life ==
Born in Budapest to a Jewish family, Gustav Spiller came to London in 1885 and gained work as a compositor. Influenced by Stanton Coit, until 1901 he worked as a printer work for the Bank of England for six months every year, using the rest of his time for self-education. In 1901 he became a lecturer for the Ethical movement, and in 1904 the salaried secretary of the International Union of Ethical Societies.

Spiller and Felix Adler organized the International Moral Education Congress, held at the University of London in September 1908. There Spiller promoted the idea of a Universal Races Congress, which took place in London in 1911 with financial support from John E. Milholland.

By 1920 Spiller had joined the Labour Office of the League of Nations in Geneva.

== Works ==
- Songs of Love and Duty for the Young, 1894
- The mind of man; a text-book of psychology, London, S. Sonnenschein & Co., 1902
- Hymns of Love and Duty for the Young, 1903
- Faith in Man: the religion of the twentieth century, 1908
- Report on moral instruction (general & denominational) and on moral training in the schools of Austria, Belgium, the British Empire, China, Denmark, France, Germany, Holland, Hungary, Italy, Japan, Norway, Portugal, Spain, Sweden, Switzerland, Turkey, & the United States, 1909
- (ed.), Papers on inter-racial problems, communicated to the first Universal Races Congress, held at the University of London, July 26–29, 1911, London: P. S. King, 1911.
- The training of the child; a parent's manual, London: Jack; New York: Dodge Pub. Co., 1912
- The meaning of marriage: a manual for parents, teachers, young people (over 18), and husbands and wives; also for spinsters and bachelors, widows and widowers, 1914
- A new system of scientific procedure; being an attempt to ascertain, develop, and systematise the general methods employed in modern enquiries at their best, London: Watts & Co., 1921
- The ethical movement in Great Britain: a documentary history, 1934
- The origin and nature of man; an enquiry into fundamentals, reconciling man's proud achievements with man's humble descent, London: Williams & Norgate Ltd., 1935
