= Bidhushekhar Shastri =

Bengali scholar, editor and linguist (1878–1957)

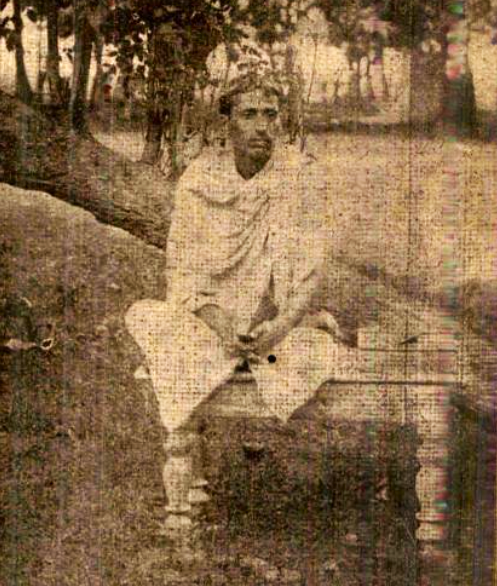
- Born: 1878; Harishchandrapur, Maldah, British India
- Died: 1957 (aged 78–79); Calcutta, West Bengal, India

Bidhushekhar Shastri (1878–1957) was a Bengali Sanskrit scholar, editor and linguist.

== Early life ==
Shastri was born as Bidhushekhar Bhattacharya at Harishchandrapur, Maldah in British India. He studied at a Tol, after receiving Kavyatirtha degree he went to Benaras for higher studies. Shastri became expert in Sanskrit language and wrote prose and poetry. He received the title Shastri from Benaras after completion of study. Initially he worked in Metropolitan Bohubazar Branch School in Kolkata, In 1905, he started his career as a Sanskrit professor in Brahmacharya Vidyalay at Santiniketan, became the principal of Vidya Bhawan, founded by Rabindranath. Then Shastri joined in the Calcutta University as Asutosh Professor. He had knowledge about Vedic literature, French, German, Tibetan and Chinese languages.

== Works ==
Shastri worked for recovering lost Sanskrit texts from Tibetan translations as well as tried to revive old Sanskrit Tols to make them relevant in contemporary society. He edited 17 books in Bengali and English on a number of subjects like Logic, Philosophy, Pali, History of Buddhism etc. Shastri received D.Litt from the Calcutta University and Deshikottama from the Visva Bharati University. In 1936 he was awarded with the title of Mahamahopadhyaya by the Government of India.
