= Leicester Secular Society =

Oldest Secular Society in the world

Leicester Secular Society is the world's oldest Secular Society. It meets at its headquarters, the Leicester Secular Hall in the centre of Leicester, England, at 75 Humberstone Gate.

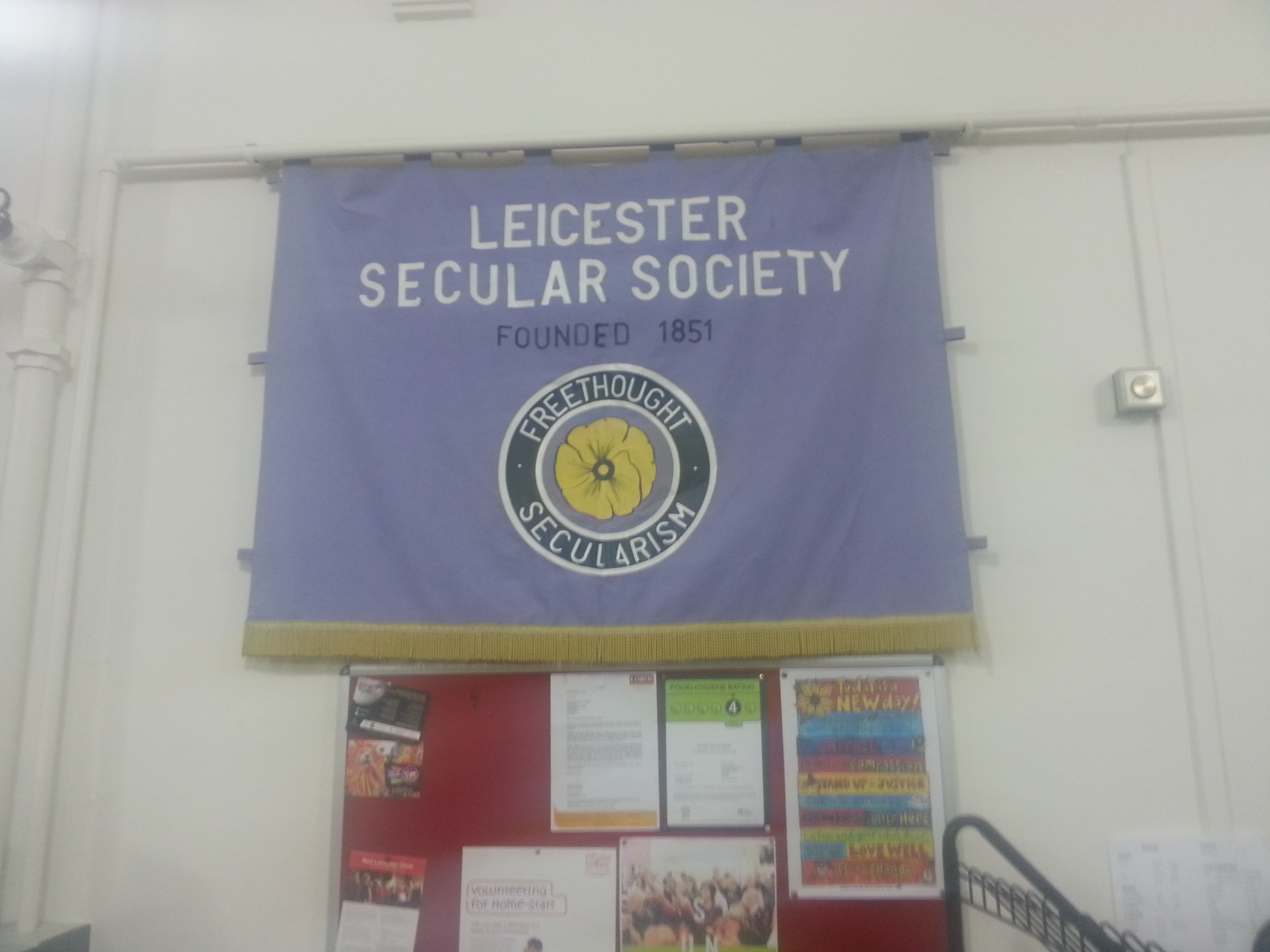
Leicester Secular Society banner

== Founding ==
Founded in 1851, the society is the oldest surviving of numerous Secular Societies formed throughout England in the mid-19th century, largely through the efforts of George Jacob Holyoake and his supporters. (The National Secular Society was founded in 1866).

== Aims ==
The 'Principal Aims' of Leicester Secular Society as stated on current (2012) literature are:

1. Challenging religious privilege and dogma

We advocate the separation of religion and state, proper representation of people with no religion, the ending of privileges for religious organisations and the secularisation of 'faith' schools. We challenge religious teachings that divert people away from reality.

2. Defending rationalism and free speech

We believe people should be free to express and publish their beliefs, however controversial, without fear of prosecution, persecution or physical harm, as long as they accord the same rights to others. Anyone should be prepared to submit their views to vigorous debate, questioning of their evidence and testing of their conclusions.

3. Working for justice and fairness

We believe our efforts should be devoted to the elimination of human misery, injustice, poverty and ignorance in the world as it is here and now. We oppose unfair discrimination, bigotry and coercion based on factors such as beliefs, racial or ethnic origins, disability, sex, age, sexuality or lifestyle.

4. Promoting a morality for life

We believe moral values and virtues like fairness, kindness, loyalty and honesty arise from people needing to live together in peace and harmony, not from any religion. Moral rules must be judged by their consequences for people now, not by their appearance in the 'holy' writings of ancient societies.

== History ==
Secularism in Leicester goes back at least as far as 1780s, when artisans in the town were in correspondence with Thomas Paine. The first formal secular organisation was Branch 26 of Robert Owen's Association of All Classes of All Nations. Branch 26 was founded in 1838 and meet in the Commercial Rooms near the market.

The first Leicester Secular Society was formed in 1852. It did not take off straight away and had to be re-established in 1867.

The early Secular Society was led for many years by Josiah Gimson, an engineer and W.H. Holyoak, a tailor. In this period, the ideas of G.J. Holyoake were influential on Leicester secularists. Some also mixed with Unitarians, an influential social and political group in the town.

By the late 1860s, the Leicester Secular Society was meeting regularly and its activities were mainly focused on discussion classes. By 1873, it had meeting rooms in Humberstone Gate. The membership was now large enough that Gimson proposed the building of a new meeting hall: the Leicester Secular Hall. This was financed by the sale of £5 shares: 80% were owned by four families, including the Gimsons. Land was purchased in Humberstone Gate. It was Gimson who chose the young and innovative architect, W Larner Sugden to design the building. Gimson also engaged the sculptor Ambrose Louis Vago for the five busts on the front of the building. These depict Robert Owen, Thomas Paine, Voltaire, Socrates and, most controversially, Jesus.

After Gimson's death in 1883, one of his sons, Sidney Gimson, became the mainstay of the society until shortly before his death in 1938. He was assisted by F. J. Gould as secretary from 1899 to 1908. Another son, Ernest Gimson, became famous as a designer in the Arts and Crafts movement of William Morris, whose speech on "Art and Socialism" at the Secular Hall in 1884 marked the beginning of the Socialist movement in Leicester.

The Society was well financed in this period, able to employ a full-time librarian and manager and run a swimming club, gymnasium, Sunday School, evening classes and a women's group. To accommodate an increased working class membership, the Hall opened a bar selling alcohol and was used by shoe workers to host their annual St Crispin's Day celebrations. The membership began to actively debate socialism versus individualism. As well as William Morris, H.M. Hyndman, John Burns and Prince Kropotkin all spoke in debates and public meetings at the Secular Hall. The Leicester branch of the Socialist League held its meetings at the Hall: several founders were members of the Secular Society.

Frederick James Gould was the Secretary to the Leicester Secular Society until 1908.

In the period after the Second World War, the society went into a decline. Average weekly attendances dropped from a high of 50 to a low of 20. However, the recent resurgence of religion as a political issue has reinvigorated the membership.

== Current status ==
As of 2015, the membership stands at around 170.

The Society publishes a journal, The Leicester Secularist, which carries reviews of events at the Hall, discussion articles and news regarding secular issues in Leicester.

A refurbishment of the ground floor of Secular Hall was completed in 2014.

The Society has adopted the strap line "for an inclusive and plural society free from religious privilege, prejudice and discrimination."

== See also ==
- Freethought Association of Canada
