= Dusé Mohamed Ali =

African nationalist

Dusé Mohamed Ali Effendi, Bey
- دوسي محمد علي
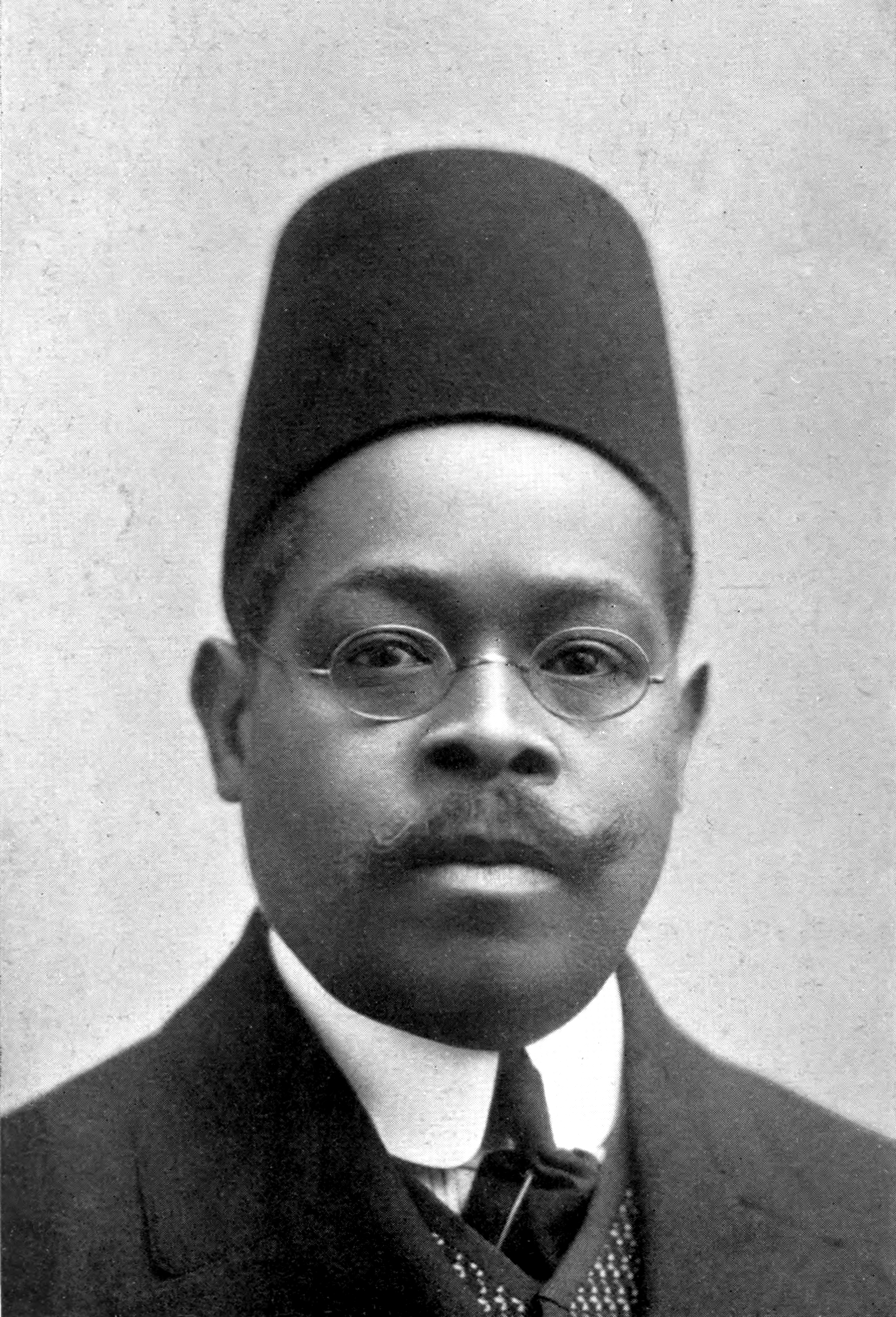
- Born: November 21, 1866; Alexandria, Khedivate of Egypt, Ottoman Empire
- Died: June 25, 1945 (aged 78)

Dusé Mohamed Ali (Arabic: دوسي محمد علي; 21 November 1866 – 25 June 1945) was a Sudanese-Egyptian actor and political activist, who became known for his African nationalism. He was also a playwright, historian, journalist, editor, and publisher. In 1912 he founded the African Times and Orient Review, later revived as the African and Orient Review, which published in total through 1920. He lived and worked mostly in England, alongside the United States and Nigeria respectively. In the latter location, he founded the Comet Press Ltd, and The Comet newspaper in Lagos.

== Early life ==
Ali was born in 1866 in Alexandria, Egypt. His father, Abdul Salem Ali, was an officer in the Egyptian Army. His mother was Sudanese. He received his early training in Egypt, but at the age of nine or 10, his father arranged for him to go to England to be educated, Ali had originally intended to study as a doctor and had started on related studies before his father's death. His father died in 1882 while serving at the Battle of Tel el-Kebir in Egypt. After that, the younger Ali, then 16, was forced to return to Egypt, settling affairs with his father's estate, Ali returned to England. Afterward he wanted to write and act. On completing his studies at the University of London. As the ward of Canon Berry, he pursued studies at King's College London.

== Actor and playwright ==
Ali was in the theatre company of Herbert Beerbohm Tree and in Lillie Langtry's production of Antony and Cleopatra at the Royal Princess Theatre, London.

As an actor, Ali toured the British Isles. He produced Othello and The Merchant of Venice at Hull, Yorkshire, in 1902, playing the parts of Othello and the Prince of Morocco. He earned praise from the British press.

He wrote several plays, producing The Jew's Revenge (1903) at the Royal Surrey Theatre in London, A Cleopatra Night (1907) at Dundee, and the Lily of Bermuda (1909), a musical comedy at the Theatre Royal, Manchester. The plot centers on a flower whose hallucinogenic scent causes people to act against their normal prejudices, illustrating Ali's desire for 'a more equitable society'. The productions were praised by the British and American press.

His production and performance in A Daughter of Judah (1906), which he first produced in the Glasgow Empire Theatre (GET) received particularly good reviews.

Mohamed toured in the United States, where he produced several plays and won recognition as an actor.

In London, he founded the Hull Shakespeare Society, of which Sir Henry Irving was the first President. Representing his political interests and considerable British interest in the Orient, he founded the Anglo-Ottoman Society, London. Its members included Lords Newton, Lamington, Stourton and Mowbray.

In 1915 Ali founded and was Secretary of the Indian Muslim Soldiers' Widows' and Orphans' War Fund. Among its patrons were Consuelo, the Duchess of Marlborough, the Right Hon. D. Lloyd George, Sir Edward Grey, Lord and Lady Lamington, Lord and Lady Newton, the Marquis and Marchioness of Crew, Mrs. H. H. Asquith, Sir Austen and Lady Chamberlain, Lord Curzon, and almost all the members, of the British Cabinet.

== Lecturer and journalist ==
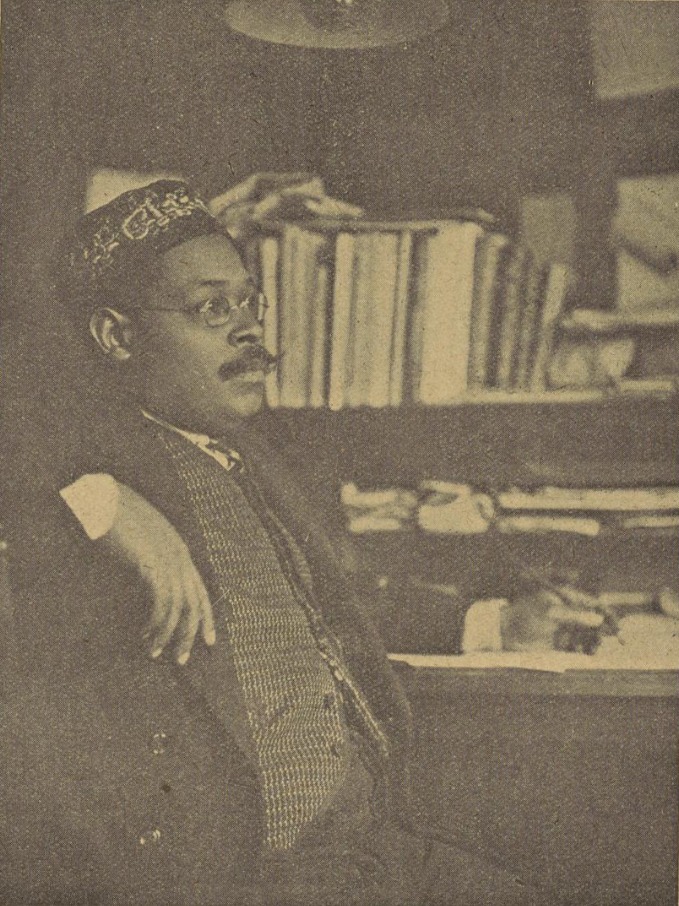
Duse Mohamed Ali at his desk at the African Times and Orient Review, London, September 1913.

After the First Universal Races Congress held at the University of London in 1911, Ali, with the help of John Eldred Jones, a journalist from Sierra Leone, in 1912 founded the African Times and Orient Review (ATOR) in London. Financial assistance in launching the paper was given by some West Africans who were temporarily in London, including J. E. Casely Hayford, a journalist and activist; Francis T. Dove and C. W. Betts from Sierra Leone, founded as a British colony; and Dr. Oguntola Sapara from Lagos, Nigeria. The journal advocated Pan-African nationalism. It became a forum for African and other intellectuals and activists from around the world. It attracted numerous contributors, including George Bernard Shaw, H. G. Wells, Annie Besant, Sir Harry H. Johnston, Henry Francis Downing, and William H. Ferris.

The young Marcus Garvey, then studying in London from Jamaica, frequently visited Ali's Fleet Street office and was mentored by him. The journal covered issues in the United States, the Caribbean, West Africa, South Africa, and Egypt. Garvey briefly worked for Ali and contributed an article to the journal's October 1913 issue.

The journal ceased publication in October 1918 during the First World War, after it was banned by the British government in India and British colonies in Africa in order to prevent unrest. It was succeeded by the African and Orient Review, which operated through most of 1920. In Europe Mohamed Ali was considered an authority on Oriental [meaning the Near East at the time] affairs, political and social. Mohamed Ali also contributed to several leading European and American periodicals; his articles were translated and published in Germany, France, Austria, Turkey, Egypt and Japan.

In 1921, following the demise of the African and Orient Review, Ali travelled to the United States, never returning to Britain. In the US he briefly worked with Garvey's Universal Negro Improvement Association (UNIA) movement. He also contributed articles on African issues to UNIA's the Negro World. He taught in a department of African affairs.

His writing career ended after he admitted that In the Land of the Pharaohs, his history of modern Egyptian history specifically criticising British rule, had plagiarised the works of Wilfred Scawen Blunt. This scandal aside, the book was well received in America.

== Travels and settlement in Nigeria ==
Ali first travelled to Nigeria in July 1921. The Lagos community welcomed him at the Shitta-Bey Mosque, Martin Street, Lagos Island. He returned to Lagos in 1931, primarily to watch over his interests in the Cocoa business. He settled in Lagos, where he was appointed Editor of the Nigerian Daily Times.

On October 3, 1932, Ali produced the play A Daughter of Pharaoh in the Glover Memorial Hall, Lagos. According to the Nigerian Daily Times, it "set a new standard in Lagos entertainment, introducing real stagecraft."

Before long Ali became editor of the Nigerian Daily Telegraph, having as his immediate assistant Ayo Lijadu (subsequently editor of the Nigerian Daily Times. Expanding his publishing interests, on 27 July 1933 Ali began publication of The Comet, a weekly newspaper. He took great interest in the educational and general welfare of the Muslim community in Lagos.

Following a protracted illness, Mohamed Ali died at the age of 78 in the African Hospital, Lagos, on 25 June 1945. His funeral took place on 27 June 1945. Attendees numbered well over 5,000, including political, social and religious leaders. A short khutba (sermon) in English was delivered by L. B. Agusto, President of the Islamic Society of Nigeria. A short oration in Arabic was also delivered by D. Couri, a friend. A large funeral procession went through the streets to Okesuna Muslim Cemetery, where Ali was buried.

== Publications ==
=== Plays ===
- The Jew's Revenge (1903)
- A Daughter of Judah (1906)
- A Cleopatra Night (1907)
- Lily of Bermuda (1909), musical comedy

=== Journals and newspapers ===
- Founded African Times and Orient Review (1912) in London; superseded by African and Orient Review (1919)
- Founded The Comet newspaper, Lagos, Nigeria

== Commemoration ==
In 2026, English Heritage erected a Blue Plaque in honour of Dusé Mohamed Ali at 55 Victoria Mansions, South Lambeth Road, London, where he lived in Flat 55 from 1911.
