= African Times and Orient Review =

Newspaper published in London

The African Times and Orient Review was a pan-Asian and pan-African journal launched in 1912 by Dusé Mohamed Ali, an Egyptian-British actor and journalist, with the help of John Eldred Taylor. ."

The first issue appeared in July 1912, as a "monthly devoted to the interests of the coloured races of the world":

The recent Universal Races Congress, convened in the Metropolis of the Anglo-Saxon world, clearly demonstrated that there was ample need for a Pan-Oriental Pan-African journal at the seat of the British Empire which would lay the aims, desires, and intentions of the Black, Brown, and Yellow races – within and without the empire – at the throne of Caesar

From July to December 1913, the review appeared monthly, and from 24 March to 18 August 1914 it appeared weekly. Contributors included Marcus Garvey, who was published in the review on his trips to Britain, Shaikh M. H. Kidwai of Gadia and Kobina Sekyi.

With the outbreak of the First World War, the British government banned the journal in India and British colonies in Africa, in an effort to prevent unrest. Publication was stopped for two years. From January 1917 to October 1918, the journal restarted as a monthly, but publication stopped until January 1920. It was revived as Africa and Orient Review, published from its offices at 158 Fleet Street, London, until December 1920.
