= First Universal Races Congress =

1911 international anti-racist conference in UK

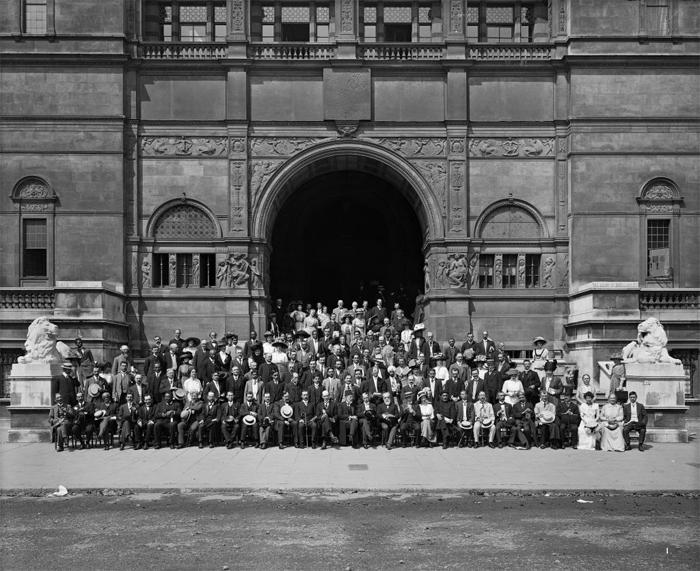
- Universal Races Congress delegates, Imperial Institute, London, 1911
- Date: 26–29 July 1911
- Duration: Four days
- Venue: University of London
- Location: UK
- Theme: Anti-racism
- Organised by: Gustav Spiller
- Participants: 2,100

The First Universal Races Congress met in 1911 for four days at the University of London as an early effort at anti-racism. Speakers from a number of countries discussed race relations and how to improve them. The congress, with 2,100 attendees, was organised by prominent humanists of that era; it was conceived of a result of comments in 1906 by Felix Adler and primarily executed by Gustav Spiller, a leader in the British Ethical Union (now Humanists UK). Philip Stanhope was president of the congress, and William Pember Reeves chaired its executive committee.

== Mission ==
The call for the congress included these remarks:

To discuss, in the light of science and modern conscience, the general relations subsisting between the peoples of the West and those of the East, between the so-called "white" and the so-called "colored" peoples, with a view to encouraging between them a fuller understanding, the most friendly feelings, and the heartier co-operation.… The interchange of material and other wealth between the races of mankind has of late years assumed such dimensions that the old attitude of distrust and aloofness is giving way to a genuine desire for a closer acquaintanceship. Out of this interesting situation has sprang the idea of holding a Congress where the representatives of the different races might meet each other face to face, and might, in friendly rivalry, further the cause of mutual trust and respect between the Occident and Orient, between the so-called "white" peoples and the so-called "colored" peoples.

=== Work ===
More than 50 countries and 20 governments sent representatives, resulting in 58 papers, which were categorized into five groups:

- Fundamental considerations
- Conditions of progress
- Problems of interracial economics and peaceful contact between civilizations
- Conscience in relation to racial questions
- Suggestions for promoting interracial relations

Resolutions resulting from the congress were:

- To urge that the establishment of harmonious relations between the divisions of mankind is a prerequisite to any attempt to diminish warfare and extend the practice of arbitration.
- To recommend to individuals of different races contacting one another courteous and respectful conduct and the study of customs and civilizations of other peoples. All civilizations have much to teach, and should be respected for their deep, historic roots.
- To emphasize that differences in civilization do not connote either inferiority or superiority.
- To study the physical and social effects of race-blending, and what promotes (or hinders) it.
- To request governments to compile statistics on the subject, and discourage hasty and crude generalizations.
- To point out the absurdity of the belief prevalent among peoples of the world that their customs, their civilization, and their physique are superior to those of other peoples, and to deprecate the looseness with which the term "race" is employed.
- To urge the importance of providing in all lands a universal, efficient system of education – physical, intellectual, and moral – as a principal means of promoting cordial relations among all divisions of mankind.
- To respect (or endeavor to assimilate or change) the economic, hygienic, educational and moral standards of immigrants rather that to seeing them as indefensible or fixed.
- To collect records of experiments showing the humane uplift of relatively backward people, and to urge the universal application of such methods.

== Participants ==
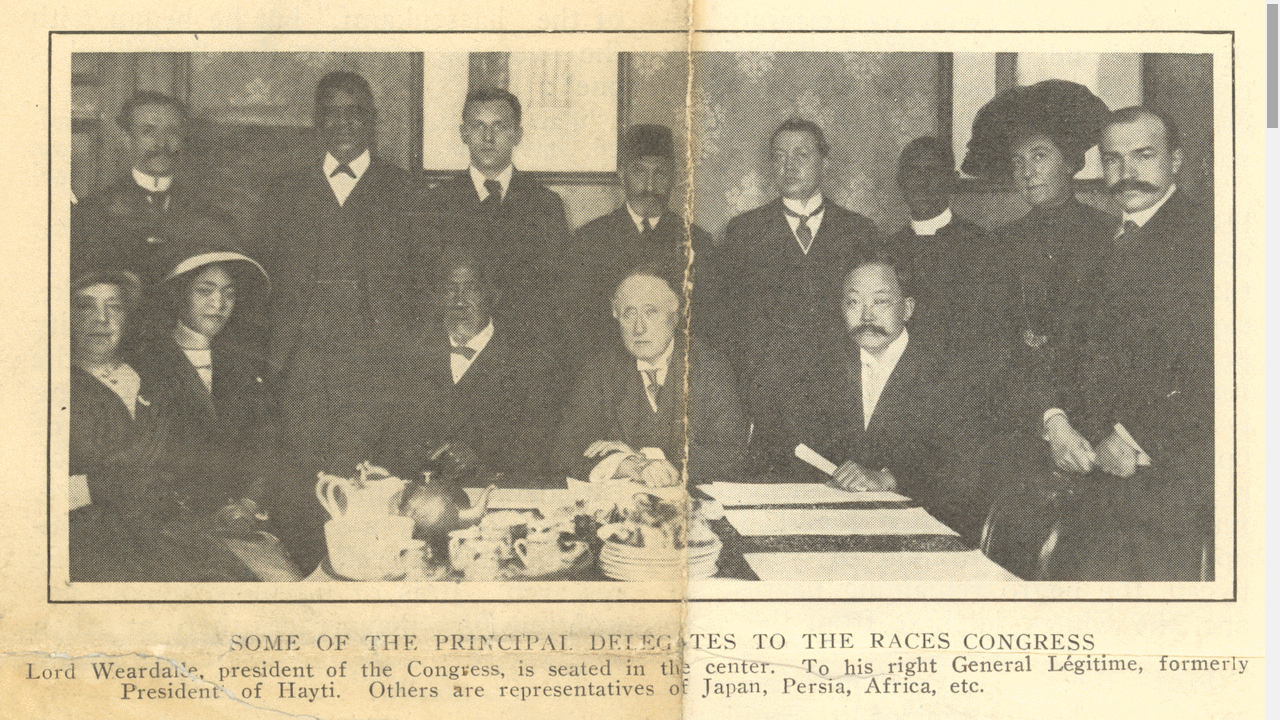
Principal delegates at the first Universal Races Congress, 1911

Felix Adler was the delegate from the United States National Bureau of Education, as it was then known. Anthropologist Franz Boas, an outspoken opponent of racism, spoke on "The Instability of Human Types", which questioned the very notion of race and racial purity. British anthropologist and ethnologist Alfred Cort Haddon wrote a paper for the journal Science about the congress. Bengali humanist philosopher Brajendra Nath Seal, a proponent of Brahmo Samaj who worked in comparative religion, delivered an address entitled "Race Origin", introducing the concept of group divergence as it relates to human evolutionary genetics and the effects of reproductive isolation. Writer, physician and reformer Charles Eastman, a Santee Sioux and Anglo-American who was active in politics and Native American rights, represented the American Indian at the congress. Sarah J. Garnet accompanied her sister Susan McKinney Steward, who delivered her paper ("Colored American Women") to the congress. The pioneering physician Frances Hoggan spoke. W. E. B. Du Bois observed that the congress could clarify the state of scientific knowledge about the meaning of "race" and presented his paper, "The Negro Race in the United States of America". Mary White Ovington, co-founder of the NAACP, was in attendance and Mojola Agbebi, an advocate of self-governance for African churches, delivered a paper. William Sanders Scarborough was the delegate from Wilberforce University, the first African-American-owned college in the United States. The head of the Bahá'í Faith, 'Abdu'l-Bahá, was invited to speak; he sent representatives, a letter and presentations by a number of Bahá'ís. Other religious speakers included Thomas William Rhys Davids, Genchi Kato and Alfred Caldecott. On the second meeting of the conference, Yahya Dowlatabadi the representative of Iran suggested that each session of the future congresses be held in each of five continents respectively. The participants agreed except for a few objections to Australia, due to its lack of population.

Attendees who did not speak at the Congress also included some present and future social reformers. Among them were Hull House founder Jane Addams, psychologist John Dewey, author H. G. Wells, and a man listed as a "barrister-at-law" in Johannesburg, South Africa, Mohandas Gandhi.

After the congress, Dusé Mohamed Ali founded the African Times and Orient Review in London. Its first issue proclaimed that "the recent Universal Races Congress, convened in the Metropolis of the Anglo-Saxon world, clearly demonstrated that there was ample need for a Pan-Oriental, Pan-African journal in the seat of the British Empire".

== See also ==
- First Pan-African Conference
- List of conferences in London
