= Leicester Secular Hall =

1881 building in Leicester, England

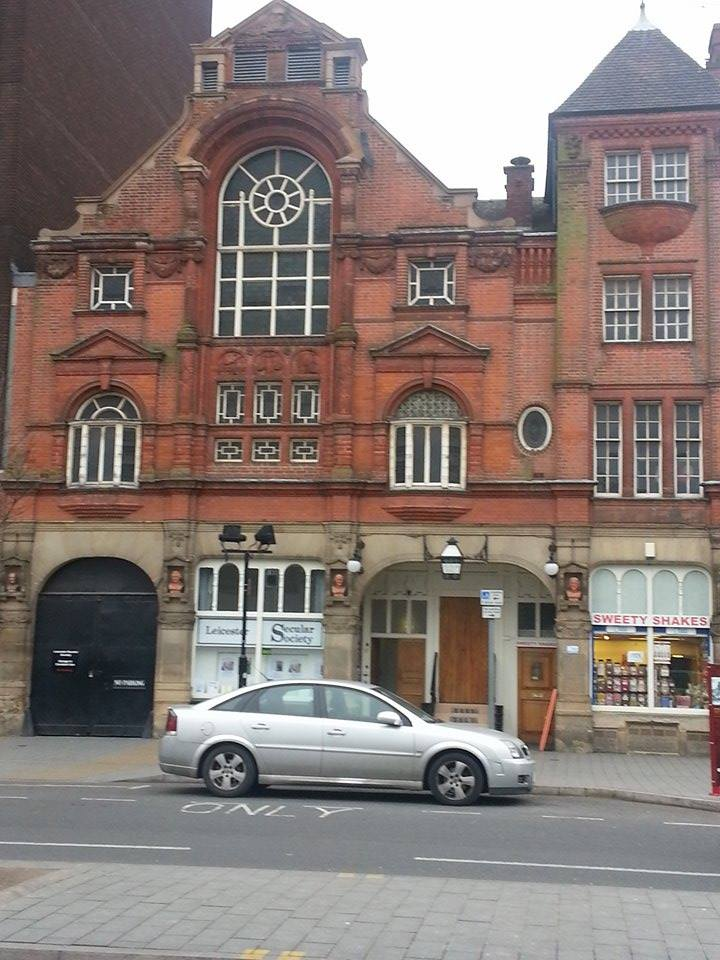
- Leicester Secular Hall in 2015
- Interactive map of the Leicester Secular Hall area

General information
- Architectural style: Free Flemish Renaissance
- Location: The Secular Hall, 75 Humberstone Gate, Leicester, LE1 1WB, UK.
- Coordinates: 52.636325°N 1.128842°W
- Current tenants: Leicester Secular Society
- Opened: 1881
- Client: Leicester Secular Hall Co. Ltd; Leicester Secular Society
- Owner: Leicester Secular Society

Design and construction
- Architect: W. Larner Sugden

Leicester Secular Hall is a Grade II listed building in Leicester, England. It was built in 1881 for the city's Secular Society.

The Leicester Secular Hall Co. Ltd was formed for its construction. The lead shareholder was Josiah Gimson, an engineer and councillor. Ownership of the Hall subsequently passed to the Leicester Rationalist Trust.

The building is located in the centre of Leicester at 73 and 75 Humberstone Gate. It was designed by W Larner Sugden of Leek, Staffordshire. The frontage contains five busts depicting, in chronological order, Socrates, Jesus, Voltaire, Thomas Paine, and Robert Owen.

== History ==
It was claimed by F.J. Gould that the building of the hall was proposed in 1872 after George Holyoake (who coined the word "secularism") was refused the use of a public room for a lecture. However, Ned Newitt argues there is no evidence to support this claim; secularist had also meet regularly in public halls in Leicester since 1868 without issue. Instead, Newitt suggest the inspiration came from articles Holyoake published in 1871 where he laid out plans for a series of Secular Halls across the country. Leicester secularists liked the idea and thought it would attract public interest.

The hall was opened on Sunday 6 March 1881. Josiah Gimson, Charles Bradlaugh and Annie Besant gave speeches.

Edward Aveling, George Bernard Shaw and William Morris are among the many radical thinkers who have spoken there.

== Architecture ==
The Secular Hall was designed by William Larner Sugden (1850-1901). Sugden was a Secularist and was chosen by Josiah Gimson. Sugden had worked for his father, also an architect, in Leek where he had encountered the ideas of William Morris (Morris was studying textile dyeing in Leek during the 1870s).

Sugden's designs are described as 'Free Flemish Renaissance' in the Historic England listing. Non-Gothic styles, like Queen Anne, had been used for Leicester civic buildings in this period to distinguish them from the buildings of the established Anglican Church.

== Current plans ==
The ground floor was partially refurbished and accessible toilets installed in 2013 funded by the members of Leicester Secular Society and Biffa. There are ambitious plans, with assistance from Heritage Lottery Fund grants, to fully refurbish the building to meet modern standards, including disabled access to the upper floors.
