= Mahamahopadhyaya =

Honorific title for scholars

Mahamahopadhyaya (Sanskrit: महामहोपाध्याय) is an honorific title given to prestigious scholars by the Government of India. Prior to 1947, the title was bestowed by the British Raj, and before them, by the kings of ancient India. In ancient India, a scholar that wrote works based on topics related to the shastras was granted the title Mahopadhyaya. The title Mahamahopadhyaya was bestowed on the best amongst the Mahopadhyaya scholars.

== History ==
In the Mithila region of the Indian subcontinent, during the early period, the title of Mahamahopadhyaya was the highest Upadhi designated to a winner scholar at the Shastrartha of the examination called Shadyantra Pariksha held at the court of the king in the region or some public place in the region. The Shadyantra Pariksha was one of the three examination systems in the early Mithila.

== Notable recipients ==
Some of the notable recipients are:

- Mahesha Thakura - The founder of the Khandawala Dynasty (Raj Darbhanga).
- Hemangada Thakura - The author of the astronomical text Grahan Mala.
- Kaviraja Shyamaldas (1836–1893), one of the first modern Indian historian and the author of Vir Vinod; Kaviraja and Dewan of Kingdom of Mewar; the title of Mahamahopadhyaya was conferred on him in January 1888
- Kaviraja Muraridan (1830–1914), Diwan, Council Member, Judge of the Appellate Court, Officer of the Civil Court, General Superintendent, and the Magistrate of the Kingdom of Marwar
- Rewa Prasad Dwivedi (1935–2021), Sanskrit scholar based in Varanasi, originally from Nadner on the banks of Narmada river in Madhya Pradesh
- Haraprasad Shastri (1853–1931), Sanskrit scholar, archivist and historian of Bengali literature
- Sri. Peri Lakshmi Narayana Sastry (1875–1949), Head Sanskrit Pandit (Retired), Maharaja's Sanskrit College, Vizianagaram, Visakhapatnam District.
- Pt. Sadashiva Jairam Dehadrai, Rao Bahadur (1861), Sanskrit scholar, Freedom Fighter and Professor of Sanskrit
- Dwaraka Nath Sen (1845–1909) -

Sanskrit and Ayurveda scholar and philanthropist whose eminent patients included the heir apparent of Mewar in 1901 and Ramakrishna Paramhamsa. He build a number of schools and libraries.

- Ganganath Jha (1871–1941) - court librarian of Raj Darbhanga and later vice-chancellor of the University of Allahabad
- Sri Sivayogi Mudigonda Nagalinga Sastri (1876–1948) - A great Samskrta scholar from the village of Tenali. Honoured for his works on Saiva Siddhanta, Vyakarna, Nyaya, Miamamsa, Agamas, Vedas and others.
- Pandurang Vaman Kane (1880–1963), Sanskrit scholar
- Jayamant Mishra (1925–2010), Sanskrit scholar
- Vedam Venkataraya Sastry (1853–1929), Sanskrit and Telugu poet, critic and dramatist
- Ram Avatar Sharma (1877–1929), Sanskrit scholar
- Datto Vaman Potdar (1890–1979), historian, writer, and orator
- Bishweshwar Nath Reu (1890–1966), historian, epigraphist, numismatist and Sanskritist
- Vasudev Vishnu Mirashi (1893–1985), Sanskrit scholar, in 1941
- Ramacharya Narsimhacharya Galagali (1892–1981), Sanskrit Scholar, Sanskrit Poet, Author of two incomplete Mahakavyam.
- Pathani Samanta (1835–1904), Sanskrit/Odia astronomer and scholar
- Jagannath Mishra (Puri, Odisha), Sanskrit scholar
- Hathibhai Shastri, Sanskrit scholar, writer, and orator. High priest of the Kingdom of Jamnagar.
- T. Ganapati Sastri, Received the Mahamahopadhyaya title in 1918
- U Ve Swaminatha Iyer (1855–1942), Tamil scholar
- Pandithamani Kathiresan Chettiar, (1881–1953), Tamil and Sanskrit scholar, translator
- Gopinath Kaviraj (1887–1976) in 1934, Sanskrit scholar, philosopher, Padma Vibhushan (1964)
- Acharya Gangaram Shastri (Bhopal, Madhya Pradesh and only one in history from the state to be conferred the honour), (1923–2014), Sanskrit and Hindi scholar
- Sri Dongare Veereswara Krishna Sastry, Sanskrit scholar
- Sri Remella SuryaPrakasa Sastry, Sanskrit scholar, Purva Mimamsa exponent from Rajahmundry Andhra Pradesh
- Sri Sannidhanam Lakshminarayana Murthy Sastry, Sanskrit Scholar, Purva Mimamsa exponent from Rajahmundry Andhra Pradesh
- Sri Pullela Sri Ramachandrudu, Sanskrit/Telugu Scholar, Director of Sanskrit Academy Osmania University, Hyderabad
- Sri Viswanatha Gopalakrishna Sastry, Sanskrit scholar, Nyaya exponent from Rajahmundry Andhra Pradesh
- Bhadreshdas Swami, Sanskrit scholar
- Yogacharya Dr Ashoke Kumar Chatterjee, World Kriyayoga Master, Conferred by Tirupati Sanskrit University with title of Mahamahopadhyaya on 6 March 2013, for His 6 decades of spiritual and literary contribution and inimitable contribution to Indology.
- Bidhushekhar Shastri (1878–1957) Sanskrit scholar and editor
- B. N. Krishnamurti Sharma (1909–2005) renowned Indian Sanskrit scholar, professor, Indologist and Dvaita Vedanta expert
- A. N. Jani (1921–2003) Sanskrit scholar and Indologist
- Dr. Mani Dravid Sastrigal, Sanskrit scholar, professor and Advaita Vedanta, Nyaya, Mimamsa and Vyakarana expert
- Shivji Upadhayaya, Sanskrit scholar and Maha-Mantri of Śrī Kāśī Vidvat Parisad.
- Sri Viswanatha Gopalakrishna, Sanskrit scholar and Advaita Vedanta, Nyaya and Mimamsa expert
- Shridharshatri Pathak
- VasudevShatri Abhyankar
- Kashinathshatrai Abhyankar
- Mahamahopadhyaya Shri Vashishta Tripathi Sanskrit scholar, Nyaya expert and President of Śrī Kāśī Vidvat Parisad.
- Pushpa Dixit, Sanskrit scholar

Dr. Anandatheertha Nagasampige, disciple of His Holiness Sri Vishweshatheertha Swamiji of Udupi Pejawar Mutt, Sanskrit Scholar, former director or Poornaprajna Samshodhana Mandiram was conferred the title of Mahamahopadhyaya in the All India Oriental Conference (2024) held at Udupi for his literary contributions.
