= Shripad Narayan Pendse =

Marathi-language writer

- श्रीपाद नारायण पेंडसे
- Born: January 5, 1913; Murdi, Ratnagiri District, Bombay Presidency, British Raj
- Died: March 23, 2007 (aged 94); Mumbai, Maharashtra, India
- Occupation: Novelist
- Writing career
- Genre: Novel
- Notable awards: Sahitya Akademi Award (1963)

Shripad Narayan Pendse (5 January 1913 – 23 March 2007) was a Marathi writer.

== Biography ==
Shripad Narayan Pendse hailed from Maharashtra, India. He was born to a village Murdi, from Taluka Dapoli in Ratnagiri District.

His novel, Rathachakra (The Chariot-Wheel), received a Sahitya Akademi Award in 1963.

His novel, Garambicha Bapu, was translated in 1969 into English, titled –'Wild Bapu of Garambi', as a part of the UNESCO Collection of Representative Works, which had been organized with Sahitya Akademi collaboration.

Haddapar (The Outcast) and Tumbadche Khot (The Khots of Tumbad) are Pendse's other two popular novels.

He was offered a Rockfeller Foundation Scholarship, under which he travelled Europe and United States in order to study and exchange his views with other novelists and learned people. He travelled for more than one year with his wife with the help of this scholarship. In his tour to England, France and the US, he met many well known writers, including E. M. Forster. EM Forster's letter to SN Pendse is reproduced in the autobiography of SN Pendse on page 243,244,245 SN Pendse "Lekhak Ani Manus" Ek Mitra published by Mouj publishers publication 228, in November 1974..

== Works ==
Novels

- Elgar in 1949
- Haddapar in 1950
- Garambicha Bapu in 1952
- Hatya in 1954
- Yashoda (small novel) in 1957
- Kalandar in 1959
- Rathachakra in 1962
- Lavhali in 1966
- Octopus in 1972.
- Akant in 1978
- Tumbadache Khot Part 1 and Part 2 in 1987
- Garambichi Radha in 1993
- Ek Hoti Aji in 1995
- Kameru in 1997
- Ghagar Rikami Re Rangamali in 2002
- Haak Abhalachi in 2007

Dramas

- Mahapur −1961
- Rajemastar −1964
- Yashoda-drama −1965
- Garambicha Bapu −1965
- Sambhusanchya Chalit −1967
- Asa zala aani ujadala −1969
- Chakravyuha −1970
- Rathachakra −1975
- Pandit ! Ata Tari Shahane Vha ! -1978
- Dr. Huddar −1990

Short stories

- Jumman −1956

Other

- Prayaschitta -translation of The Scarlet Letter in 1969
- Best upakramachi katha −1972 (he was Deputy Public Relations Officer in BEST undertaking and retired in 1972)

Articles

- Ek Muktasanvad- Udyachya Kadambarikarashi in 1995
- Adhyatacha Shodh in 1996
- Ek Durlabh Sneh in 1996

Characterisation

- Khadakavaril Hiraval in 1941

Autobiography

- Shri Na Pendse-Manus Ani Lekhak in 1974

Translation into other languages

- Garambicha Bapu- In Hindi (1959) and English (1969)
- Kalandar- In Gujarati (1970)
- Rathachakra- In Gujarati (1971)
- Octopus- In Hindi (1976)
- Hatya- In Hindi (1976)

== Footnotes ==
This article is based on his autobiography, written in 1974, and published by Mauj Prakashan.
