= Pullella Sriramachandrudu =

Indian scholar (1927–2015)

Pullela Sriramachandrudu
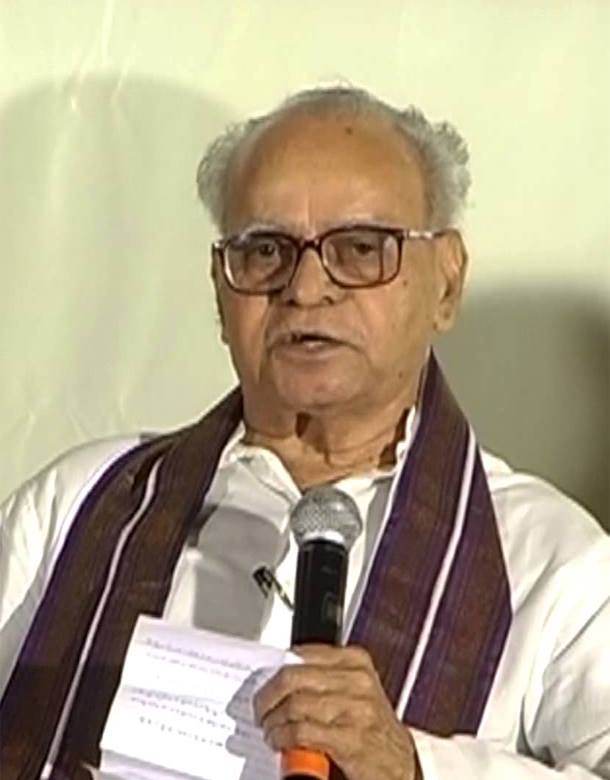
- Born: 24 October 1927; Indupalli village, Amalapuram, East Godavari district, Andhra Pradesh, British India
- Died: 24 June 2015 (aged 87); Hyderabad, Andhra Pradesh, India
- Occupation(s): Scholar, Writer
- Spouse: Smt. Subbalakshmi
- Parents: Smt. Satyavati; Sri. Pullela Satyanarayana Sastry
- Awards: Padma Sri; Mahamahopadhyaya
- Website: Profile on Osmania University

Dr. Pullella Sriramachandrudu (24 October 1927 – 24 June 2015) was an Indian scholar of Vedanta, Vyakarana and Alankara Sastra and a prolific writer of Sanskrit and Telugu literature. He was widely credited with several books in Sanskrit and Telugu and was best known for translating many difficult Sanskrit works into Telugu the seven volume Telugu edition of the Indian epic, Ramayanam by Valmiki. The Government of India has honored Pullella Srirama Chandrudu in 2011, with the fourth highest civilian award of Padma Shri.

== Early life ==
Pullela Sriramachandrudu was born in Indupalli Village, Ayinavolu Mandal of East Godavari District on 24 October 1927. His parents were Sri. Pullela Satyanarayana Sastry and Smt. Satyavati. Their family then moved to the nearby village of Ayinavilli.

== Education ==
Pullela Sriramachandrudu studies Panchakavyas, Sriharsha's Naishadam, Murari Anargharaghavam and Siddhantakaumudi under his father. He later joined the Sanskrit college at Narendrapuram and studied the classics like Kirataarjuneeyam and other grammatical works under the tutelage of Sri. Kompella Subbaraya Sastry. Later he moved to the Madras Mylapore Sanskrit college where he graduated as 'Vedanta Siromani'. While he was studying in the Madras college, he learnt to communicate in English with the help of a friend V. Venkatachalam. Also he passed the 'Hindi Visharada' examination from the Hindi Prachar Sabha.

In 1948, he found a job as Hindi Pandit in Malikipuram. But his appetite for learning had not been satisfied and while he was teaching Pullela Sriramachandrudu he also passed out of the Matriculation examination in 1950. He later went on to complete the 'Telugu Vidwan' examination in 1952, Intermediate in 1953 and in 1955 he finished the Bachelor of Arts. Then, he enrolled in the famous Banaras Hindu University for Masters majoring in Sanskrit grammar (Metaphors and Allegories) and also another Masters in English and passed out in 1957 and 1961 respectively. In 1963, he again passed out of Masters in Hindi from the same university.

Now having mastered Sanskrit, Hindi, Telugu and English, he presented a thesis on "Contributions of Panditaraja Jagannatha to Sanskrit poetics" to Osmania University in Hyderabad under the supervision of Aryendra Sharma for which he was awarded a doctors.

== Marriage ==
As was the custom in those days, Sriramachandrudu was married to Smt. Subbalakshmi who was the daughter of Sri. Mangipudi Venkata Sastry at an early age of 14 years. His wife was 8 at the time of their marriage.

== Career ==
Sriramachandrudu's first job was as a Hindi Pandit in Malikipuram High School. In 1951, he joined the K.B.R. College in Amalapuram as a Sanskrit Pandit and in 1957 he was made a Sanskrit lecturer. From 1960 to 1965, he worked as a Sanskrit lecturer in Warangal college and in 1965 he was transferred to Osmania University's college of arts. in 1976, he was also the director of Sri Venkateshwara Oriental Research Institute in Tirupati for a period of about 4 months. Later he returned to Osmania University and continued as a reader and after a promotion to the grade of Professor, he managed the Sanskrit Department. He also worked as the director of Sanskrit Academy for about 11 years and as a Secretary and Vice-President of Surabharati Association.

== Selected bibliography ==
The Chronological list of his works is:

Year	Name of the Work	Remarks
1953	Hindī – Telugu Vyākaraṇamu	A grammar of Hindi written in Telugu
1962	Sanskrit translation of Gītāñjali of Rabindranath Tagore	
1963	Rāghavaśatakamu (Telugu)	
1964	Kumatiśatakamu	A parody on Sumatiśatakamu in Telugu
1964	Stories of Tenāli Rāmaliṃga (Telugu)	
1964	Susaṃhatabhāratam	A Sanskrit Play in Six Acts
1971	Laghusiddhāntakaumudī	Exhaustive commentary in Telugu
1971	Telugu-Saṃskṛta Nighaṇṭu	
1974	Our Religions and Customs (Telugu)	
1977	Kāḷīdāsukavitāvaibhavamu (Telugu)	
1977	Vakroktijīvitam	Exhaustive commentary in Telugu
1977	Dhammapādam	Translation into Sanskrit and English with notes in Sanskrit
1977, 1981	Vākyapadīyam	Commentary on some portions in Telugu
1978	Vivekacūḍāmaṇi	Telugu translation of the text and the commentary of HH. Candraśekharabhāratī of Śaradāpīṭham, Śṛṅgerī
1979	Anthology of Indian Literatures	Translation into Telugu of Sanskrit portions
1979	Ratnāvalī	Translation into Telugu
1979	Rāgarociḥ	Sanskrit Translation of Telugu poems
1979	Kāvyālaṅkāra of Bhāmaha	Commentary in Telugu
1979	Kāvyamīmāṃsā	Commentary in Telugu
1979	Bāṇabhaṭṭa	Telugu translation of the English original of K. Krishnamurthy
1979	The Contributions of Andhras to Buddhism	Telugu translation of English original by K. Satchidananda Murthy
1980	Kāvyālaṅkārasūtravṛtti	Exhaustive commentary in Telugu
1981	Kāvyādarśa	Exhaustive commentary in Telugu
1981	Nītidviṣaṣṭikā (Sundarapāṇḍyuni āryā)	Commentary in Telugu
1982	Kaliviḍambanam	
1982	Vairāgyaśatakam	Commentary in Telugu
1982	Sabhārañjanaśatakam	Commentary in Telugu
1983	Aucityavicāracarcā	Commentary in Telugu
1983	Kavikaṇṭhābharaṇam	Commentary in Telugu
1983	Suvṛttatilakam	Commentary in Telugu
1983	Sevyasevakopadeśa	Commentary in Telugu
1983	The Contribution of Panditaraj Jagannatha to Sanskrit Poetics	(English) in two volumes
1983	Nibandhabhāskaraḥ	Twelve essays in Sanskrit
1983	Pārasīkalokoktayaḥ	Sanskrit rendering of Persian proverbs in 327 verses
1983	Bhāratīyavijñānavettalu (Telugu)	
1984	Rūpakaparicayaḥ (Sanskrit)	
1984	Taittirīyopaniṣat	Telugu commentary following Śāṇkarabhāṣya
1984	Kenopaniṣat	Telugu commentary following Śāṇkarabhāṣya
1984	Praśnopaniṣat	Telugu commentary following Śāṇkarabhāṣya
1984	Muṇḍakopaniṣat	Telugu commentary following Śāṇkarabhāṣya
1984	Māṇḍūkyopaniṣat	Telugu commentary following Śāṇkarabhāṣya
1984	Nagarjuna	Telugu translation of English original by K. Satchidananda Murthy
1984	Vyāsamaharṣi (Telugu)	
1986	Panditaraja Jagannatha	Mongoraph in English ( Published by Central Sahitya Akademi)
1986	Bhavabhūti	Telugu translation of English original by G. K. Bhat
1986 – 1995	Śrīvālmīkirāmāyaṇamu	Word to word meanings and paraphrase in Telugu ( 10 volumes of about 800 pages each)
1987	Mahākavi Kāḷidāsu (Telugu)	
1988	Śrīrāmasahasranāmastotram (Sanskrit)	
1988	Śrītyāgarājasahasranāmastotram (Sanskrit)	
1989	Sanskrit commentary on Sūryadaṅḍaka of Mayūra	
1989	Agnipurāṇam	Telugu translation in two volumes
1991	Bhāsuḍu	Telugu translation of English original of V. Venkatachalam
1992	Pātañjalayogasūtram	Exhaustive commentary in Telugu
1992	Saṃskṛtasūktiratnakośaḥ Part I – with Telugu translation	
1993	Jīvanmuktivivekaḥ	Commentary in Telugu
1993	Saṃskṛtasūktiratnakośaḥ Part II – with Telugu translation	
1993	Vyāghrītanayasaṃvādaḥ	
1993	Vasantāgamanam	
1993	Mahān bhārato'ham	
1993	Na kadācidanīdṛśaṃ jagat	
1993	Ādhunikakāvyalakṣaṇam	
1993	Bhāratadeśasya svarājyādhigamaḥ	
1993	Hāsyaguṭikaḥ	
1993	Śabarī	
1993	Nehruviṣaye caramaślokaḥ	
1993	Kavikulakokilaḥ	
1993	Saumyo dadāt saumyatām	
1993	Saṃskṛtabhāṣaḥ	
1993	Muktakāni	
1993	Śrīrāmakṛṣṇaparamahaṃsasūktayaḥ	
1993	Advaitamate praśastaguṇaḥ	
1993	Advaitam paramaṃ rahasyam	
1993	Advaitameva vaidikaṃ darśanam	
1993	Samasyāpūrtayaḥ śrīrāmastutiśca	
1993	Anūditāni mahādevivarmaṇaḥ gītāni	
1993	Nagare śṛṅgāṭakam	
1993	Jīrṇacchatram	
1993	Bhiṣajo bhaiṣajyam	
1993	Śikhā (Ekāṅkikā)	
1993	Vināyakāṣṭakam	
1993	Muktīśvarāṣṭakam	
1993	Muktīśvaravarṇamālāstotram	
1993	Śrīveṅkateśvaraśaraṇāgatiḥ	
1993	Āryāśatakam (Veṅkateśvarastutiḥ)	
1993	Śrīcandraśekharendrasarasvatīpadyakusumopahāraḥ	
1993	Śrīrāmakṛṣṇaparamahaṃsastutiḥ	
1993	Śrīrāghavendrāṣṭakam	
1993	Śrīcandraśekharabhāratīśaraṇāgatiḥ	
1993	Vividhastutayaḥ	
1994	Cāṇakyanītisūtrāṇi	Telugu translation
1995	Saṃskṛta vyākaraṇa vimarśa saṃpradāyamu (Telugu)	
1995	Nītivākyāmṛtam	Telugu translation of Sanskrit original of Somadeva (12th Century)
1995	Nāgānandam	Telugu translation (done in 1956, published in 1995)
1994	Kāvyaprakāśaḥ	Exhaustive commentary in Telugu
1995	Śyāmalādaṇḍakam	Commentary in Telugu
1996	Some Unexplored Aspects of Rasa Theory	English translation of the Hindi original of B. M. Chaturvedi
1996	Vaijñānikaṣāṇmukham	Sanskrit essays on Pāṇini, Kaṇāda, Kauṭilya, Āryabhaṭa, Varāhamihira and Bhāskara
1997	Ko vai rasaḥ (Sanskrit)	
1998	Nyāyaśāstravettalalo rājanītiviśāraduḍu	Telugu translation of English original by Justice Alladi Kuppuswamy
1998	Dhvanyāloka	Exhaustive commentary in Telugu
1998	Dhvanyālokalocana	Exhaustive commentary in Telugu
1998	Egalitarian and Peace-keeping Trait of the Indian Mind	
1999	Kauṭilyam arthaśāstram	Commentary in Telugu
1999	Alaṅkāraśāstramu – ādhunikasāhityamu (Telugu)	
1999	The Upanishadic Philosophy	
2000	Jagadvaṃdyulaina Jagadguruvu	Biography of Jagadguru Śrībhāratītīrthasvāmī of Śṛṅgerīśāradapīṭham in Telugu
2000	Brahmasūtraśāṅkarabhāṣyam	Exhaustive commentary in Telugu (2 Volumes)
2000	Adhyātmarāmāyaṇamu	Word-to-word meanings and paraphrase in Telugu (Joint authorship)
	Influence of Sanskrit on Telugu Language and Literature (English)	
2001	Adityasuprabhātastotram (Sanskrit)	
2001	Śrībhagavadgītāśāṅkarabhāṣyam	Exhaustive commentary in Telugu
2001	Śambhormūrtiḥ	Telugu translation of Sanskrit original of Śrījanārdānandasarasvatī
2002	Alaṅkāraśāstracaritra	History of Sanskrit Poetics in Telugu
2002	Prākṛtabhāṣāvāṅmayacaritra (Telugu)	
2002	Saṃskṛtavacovichittiḥ pratyayārthavaicitrī ca	Sanskrit Idioms and Phrases in Sanskrit and English
1949	Hindi-Telugu Dictionary published by a book-publisher in his name	
2003	Śāstrasiddhāntaleśasaṅgraha of Appayadīkṣita	Commentary in Telugu
2003	Yājñavalkyasmṛti	Commentary in Telugu following Mitākṣara
2003	Bhaṭṭi	A Monograph in English ( Pub. by Central Sahitya Akademi)
2004	Sītārāvaṇasaṃvādajhari, Part – I	Telugu commentary
2004	Sītārāvaṇasaṃvādajhari, Part – II	Telugu commentary
2004	Kāḷīdāsakavitāvilāsamu	A Monograph in Telugu on Kalidasa
2004	Paṃḍitarāyalu	A Monograph in Telugu on Panditaraja Jagannatha
2004	Mahiṣaśatakam	With word to word meaning and purport in Telugu
2004	Telugunāṭa matamulu saṃpradāyamulu	Religions and traditions in Telugu country
2004	Śāradāmaṃdahāsaṃ bhāsamahākavi	A Monograph in Telugu on Bhāsa
2004	Mṛcchakaṭikacchaṭa	A Monograph in Telugu on Śūdraka
2004	Kauṇḍinyasmṛti	A modern Smṛti in Sanskrit with own English translation
2005	Māghamahākavi	English translation of Hindi original (Pub. by Central Sahitya Akademi)
2005	Dakṣiṇāmūrtistotramu	Telugu commentary
2005	Samasāmayikam	Sanskrit ślokas on 36 topics
2006	Pāścātyatattvaśāstretihāsaḥ	A History of Western Philosophy in Sanskrit
2007	Śrībhagavadgīta – āṃdhraṭīkātātpartyasahitaṃ	
2007	Ādityastotraratnam of Appayadīkṣita	Telugu translation
2008	Hindūmatamu konni itara matālu	Hinduism and a few other religions
2008	Sarvadarśanasaṅgraha	With exhaustive Telugu commentary
2009	Śrīmatpātañjalasūktisudhābindavaḥ	Explanation in English
2009	Mānavatājanmapradāta mānyaguruvaryuḍu	Telugu monograph
2009	Dhammapadam	Telugu translation
2009	Kauṇḍinyasmṛti	Telugu translation
2010	Śrīmadrāmāyaṇāmṛtataraṇgiṇilo manobhāvalaharīvilāsālu (Telugu)	
2010	Glimpses into Kauṭilya's Arthaśāstra	English translation by P. Shashirekha and Aruna Vyas of the Telugu Preface of Pullela Ramachandrudu to Kauṭilyam arthaśāstram
2011	Śriśivadṛṣṭiḥ of Somānanandanātha with the Vṛtti of Utpaladevācārya	Telugu commentary
2011	Śrīpullela vāri prastāvanalu	Telugu – Collection of forewords of Śrī Pullela Sriramachandrudu
2011	Viśvamānavahita bhagavadgīta (Telugu)	
2012	Mahābhāratasārasaṅgrahamu (Telugu)	
2012	Śrīmadrāmāyaṇāmloni upamālaṃkārāla nirupamāna saundaryamu	Telugu – The Incomparable Beauty of Upamā alaṅkāras in Rāmāyaṇa
2012	Narajanmapraśasti – naruni kartavayamu	Telugu translation of Sanskrit anugrahasandeśa of HH Jagadguru Candraśekharabhāratī
2012	Śrīsatyasundareśvarasuprabhātam	
2013	Vālmīkirāmāyaṇaṃ mūlānusāri anuvādamu	Telugu prose translation of Ramayana
2014	Bharatamunipraṇītam Nāṭyaśāstram	
2015	Vyāsamañjarī	Compilation of Essays

=== Collections / Edited works ===
Year	Name of the Work
1971	Nyāyarakṣāmani of Appaya Dīkṣita
1982	Saṃskṛtakavijīvitam (Jointly edited)
1981	Kāśikā with Padamañjarī
1981	Sāhityaratnākaraḥ - Part III
1982	Kriyāsvaralakṣaṇam of Sūrubhaṭṭa
1982	Saṅgītacandraḥ
1984	Nīlakaṇṭhadīkṣitasya laghukāvyāni
1985	Kāśikā with Nyāsa
1985	Mahiṣaśatakam
1986	Katha in Sanskrit Poetics
1987	Paribhāṣenudsaṅgrahaḥ (Edited along with others)
1988	Kādambarīkathāsāraḥ
1988	Āyurvedābhisāraḥ
1989	Ānandalaharī and other works of Appaya Dīkṣita
1989	Kāvyalakṣaṇavādaḥ
1989	Nibandhamañjūṣā - A Collection of Literary Essays
1990	Abhinavavāsavadattā
1994	Gadyasaṇgrahaḥ
1999	The Tirumala Music Inscription – prathamopalabdha svarasahita saṃkīrtana śilālekhamu (Along with others)
2007	Vidhirasāyanam, Purvottaramīmāṃsāvādanakṣatramālā, Upakramaparākramaḥ, Pūrvamīmāṃsāviṣayasaṅgrahadīpikā – Works of Appaya Dīkṣita
2010	Śrīmadappayyadīkṣitendrakr̥tayaḥ Śivārcanacandrikā, Madhvatantramukhamardanam, Pāṇinitantravādanakṣatramālā, Mānasollāsaḥ, Śivadhyānapaddhatiḥ, Āryāśatakam, stotrāṇi ca
2011	Upaniṣatsudhālahari (Telugu – A collection of lectures on social aspects in Upanishads)

=== Books inspired / commissioned / edited / facilitated ===
1. From 1971, he edited most of the nearly 30 works of Appaya Dikshita published by the Srimad Appaya Deekshitendra Granthavali Prakasana Samithi – of which he was a Vice President.
2. During the 1980s, he as Secretary was instrumental in the publication of more than a score of works by Sura Bharati Samiti.
3. In 2004, the Saṃskṛta Bhāṣā Pracāra Samiti brought out 25 monographs in Telugu to commemorate its silver jubilee. Eight of these (included in the above list) were authored by Pullela Sriramachandrudu, who conceptualized, commissioned and edited the entire series.
