= International Moral Education Congress =

International academic conference held in Europe six times between 1908 and 1934

The International Moral Education Congress was an international academic conference held in Europe six times between 1908 and 1934. It convened because of an interest in moral education by many countries beginning a decade before the inaugural event. The movement for moral education had an ardent champion in the Ethical movement. The idea to hold the congress was at the behest of the International Union of Ethical Societies; its greatest proponents were Professor Friedrich Wilhelm Foerster and Gustav Spiller, the secretary of the Union. The first congress was held in 1908, and except for one 10-year beak (1912–1922), the congress met every four years in various cities. The official languages were German, English, and French.

== Background ==
The Moral Education League of London was founded in 1897. This organization exercised a considerable influence, not only in the United Kingdom but in various parts of the British Empire and throughout the world. Its president was John Stuart Mackenzie. Among its members were Catholics, Anglicans, Jews, Unitarians, Hindus, Muslims, Buddhists, Nonconformists, Ethicists, Rationalists, Positivists, and others. Its secretary was Harrold Johnson, who was later appointed Hon. Secretary of the International Moral Education Congress Executive Council. The league also employed a demonstrator, Frederick James Gould, who acquired an international reputation for his numerous books on moral lessons. This League succeeded in 1906 in inducing the Board of Education to make provision for moral instruction in the education code for England and Wales.

In 1905, a new Italian Education Code was published, laying the utmost stress on moral education and making detailed regulations with regard to moral instruction. In the following year, a new Hungarian Education Code was issued. In 1905, a new Austrian Education Code came to light. In Portugal, a manual of Moral Instruction for Primary Schools, as distinct from Religious Instruction, was officially published in 1906. In the United States, schemes of moral instruction were elaborated in many places. In Germany, the Reading Books for Elementary Schools contained abundance of ethical matter. In Switzerland, several Cantons took distinct steps in the direction of drawing up Moral Instruction Programmes. In Belgium, Moral Instruction Syllabuses for Primary Schools and for Training Colleges existed. In France and Japan, where moral instruction was introduced, the subject was being studied with redoubled interest. In Russia, the authorities were turning their attention to this subject. And, finally, in England, the Code of the Board of Education for 1906 stated that "Moral instruction should form an important part of every school curriculum".

Educationists generally laid increasing emphasis on the moral factor in education, while men in every walk of life came more and more to feel that the training of the intellect must be accompanied by the development of character if the school is to serve effectively the nation and humanity. This movement for moral education had an ardent champion in the Ethical movement.

== 1908 ==
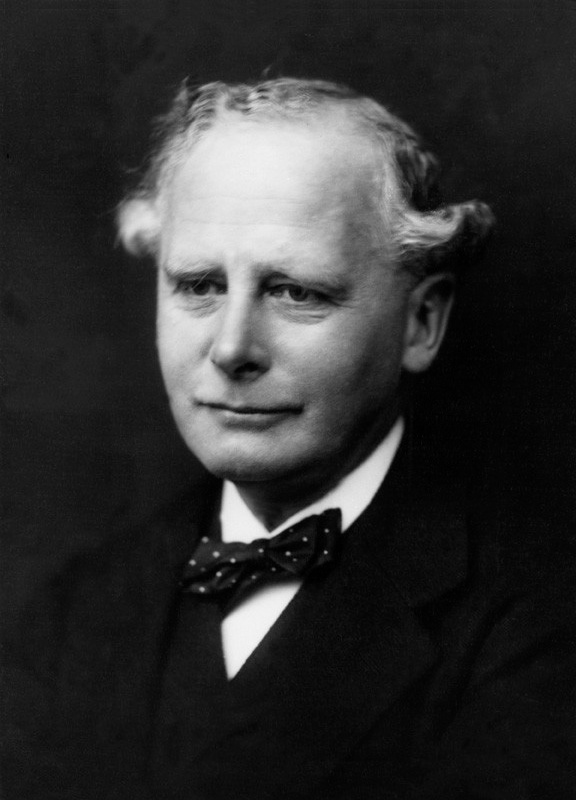
Sir Michael Ernest Sadler, president of the First Congress

The First Congress was held at the University of London, London, England, on September 25–29, 1908. Michael Sadler served as president. The Congress counted altogether some 1,800 members and 2,000 volumes of the Papers on Moral Education were disposed of within less than four weeks after the first Congress met. Both educational magazines and leading daily papers rendered valuable assistance to the Congress. There were sessions on the following topics: The Principles of Moral Education; Aims, Means and Limitations in the various types of schools; Character Building by Discipline, Influence and Opportunity; the Problems of Moral Instruction; Relation of Religious Education to Moral Education; Systematic Moral Instruction; The Relation of Moral Education to Education under Other Aspects; the Problem of Moral Education under varying conditions of Age and Opportunity; Biology and Moral Education.

== 1912 ==
The Second Congress was held at The Hague, Netherlands, August 22–27, 1912. Dr. J. Th. Mouton was the President of the Executive Committee. The following twenty-three countries sent official government delegates: Belgium, Bulgaria, Canada, Chili, China, Denmark, Egypt, France, Greece, Haiti, Hungary, India (British), Ireland, Japan, Norway, Portugal, Russia, Romania, South Australia, Spain, Sweden, Turkey and Tunis. Over 1,000 members (apart from honorary members) were officially enrolled for the congress. Over 200 papers of some 2,000 words each were contributed and appeared in the five published volumes of more than 1,200 pages. The subjects dealt with and under discussion at the various sessions were: Moral Education and Character Building considered from the Denominationalist, the Undenominationalist and the Independent-Moralist points of view; Moral Education considered from social and national points of view Formation of the Will; Physical Training as a means of Character-Building; Moral Education considered from a Practical Point of View; the Moral Education of Adolescents; Character-Building in family life and in society at large; Character-Building of young people at educational institutions not dedicated to the ordinary primary education; Character-Building of Abnormal Children.

This Congress stated it would not advocate the views of any society or party, but it would afford to all who are interested in moral education, whatever their religious or ethical convictions, nationality and point of view, an equal opportunity of expressing their opinions and comparing them with those of others. This proved so good a basis that the congress with unanimity adopted it as the basis of future congresses, with the addition of the following object: The object of the Congress is to enlist the active co-operation of all, irrespective of race, nations, and creed, in promoting the work of moral education. The first aim of the Second Congress, as of the first, was to cultivate the co-operation of men and women representing different schools of thought in matters of education, giving every one an opportunity in the spirit of toleration, of defining and explaining his opinion and point of view.

== 1922 ==
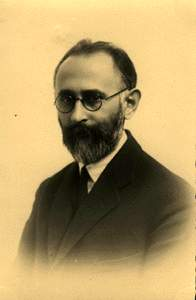
Adolphe Ferriere, president of the Third Congress

The Third Congress met in the Aula, or Assembly Hall, of the University of Geneva, Switzerland, July 28 to August 1, 1922. About 500 members attended, representing 30 nationalities and 29 national committees. Thirty-three papers were contributed, all being published in French, in two volumes, by Delachaux, at Neuchatel. The topics were confined to (1) the international motive, with special reference to the teaching of history; and (2) the motive of service. Frederick Pollock gave the inaugural address on behalf of the International Executive Council (London), and was followed by the newly elected president of the Congress, Adolphe Ferrière, who was an advocate of progressive education. Among the speakers during the eight sessions, perhaps the most popular were three—Professor Foerster; Albert Thomas, Director of the Labor Office of the League of Nations; and Robert Baden-Powell, the founder of the Scout Movement. A special session was held in the hall of the Secretariat of the League of Nations, chaired by Gustav Spiller, which included Nitobe Inazō, Director of the Section of International Bureaus. The Congress approved of the establishment of an International Moral Education Bureau at The Hague, and decided to form a permanent association of educationists of the world, based on the 29 national committees already existing.

== 1926 ==
The Fourth Congress took place in Rome, Italy, from September 28 to October 2, 1926. Francesco Orestano served as president.

== 1930 ==
The Fifth Congress took place at the University of Sorbonne in Paris, France, September 23–27, 1930. Sébastien Charléty served as president.

== 1934 ==
The Sixth Congress took place in Kraków, Poland, September 11–14, 1934.

== Scholarly review ==
In 2004, Marco Cicchini of the University of Geneva published his study based on a review of the proceedings and publications of the six congresses. He synthesized the congresses' aims and ideals, the theoretical and institutional outlines, the socio-professional profiles of the participants, the status of their contributions, and the disciplines invited to discuss the issues. He also noted on the changes which led to the disappearance of the congress.
