= Frederick James Gould =

English teacher, writer, and pioneer secular humanist (1855-1938)

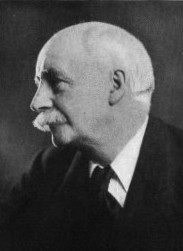
- Gould in 1921: portrait by G. C. Beresford
- Born: 19 December 1855; Brighton, England
- Died: 6 April 1938 (aged 82); London, England
- Occupations: Writer, teacher
- Known for: Pioneer of secular humanism

Frederick James Gould (19 December 1855 – 6 April 1938) was an English teacher, writer, and pioneer secular humanist.

== Early life and career ==
Gould was born in Brighton, the son of William James Gould and his wife Julia, who were evangelical Anglicans. After growing up in London, he was sent at age seven to sing in the choir at St George's Chapel, Windsor Castle, where he also studied. He then attended school in Chenies, Buckinghamshire, where he became a day and Sunday school teacher. At the age of fifteen, he thought he heard voices in his head exclaiming "How wonderful is the love of God!", following which he studied theology "in a kind of devout fury". However, after he was appointed head teacher at Great Missenden church school in 1877, he began to develop doubts about his own religious faith.

Gould moved to London in 1879, married, and began working as a teacher in publicly funded board schools in poorer parts of the East End. By the early 1880s he had become actively involved in the Secularist movement. He was transferred from the school in Bethnal Green to Limehouse in 1887, after his published notes in the Secular Review were seen by his employers, the London School Board, and he was exempted from teaching the Bible. He later asked to be allowed to resume Bible teaching, to stress its ethical rather than supernatural elements, but this was refused.

== Work as a secularist and humanist ==
Gould met the American-born secularist Stanton Coit at a lecture in 1889 on moral instruction in French schools. Coit helped Gould set up the East London Ethical Society, for whom Gould then devised a series of ethical lessons for use in Sunday schools, which he later developed into a four-volume book, The Children's Book of Moral Lessons (1897). He also wrote articles on secular humanism, and the books Stepping-Stones to Agnosticism (1890) and The Agnostic Island (1891), both published by Charles A. Watts' publishing company. In 1890, with Watts, George Holyoake and others, he helped form the Propagandist Press Committee, which became the Rationalist Press Association in 1899. In 1896, with Coit, he helped establish a Union of Ethical Societies, which became the forerunner of the later British Humanist Association.

Gould left teaching in 1896, and in 1899 moved with his family to Leicester, where he had first spoken in 1883. Succeeding Joseph McCabe, he worked as Secretary to the Leicester Secular Society until 1908. He published a History of the Leicester Secular Society in 1900. During this period he became increasingly influenced by the writings of Auguste Comte, and in 1902 he joined the Positivist Church of Humanity and founded the Leicester Positivist Society. From 1904 to 1910 he was a Labour Party councillor in Leicester. In 1909, he was one of the first to adopt the term "Humanist" in its modern sense.

Gould later worked as a lecturer and demonstrator, initially for the Moral Education League, and from 1919 to 1927 was Honorary Secretary to the International Moral Education Congress. After his son, Julian Gould, was killed in action at Arras in 1917, he became increasingly interested in the work of the League of Nations and world peace.

Gould travelled and toured widely giving talks, notably in the United States and India under Government auspices. His work included writings and lectures on ethical topics, and he became noted for his insistence that secular education should draw on a wide range of moral examples, including those from the Bible, Shakespeare, and biographies. He worked to promote non-theological moral instruction. He wrote many books and pamphlets covering a wide range of subjects, including religious history, Biblical criticism and educational methods. He wrote The Life-Story of a Humanist (1923), as well as a biography of Auguste Comte. In later years he lived in Ealing, London.

== Bibliography ==
- Religious Instruction in Board Schools, pamphlet, 1888
- Stepping Stones to Agnosticism, collected pamphlets, 1889
- Bruno: A Sketch of His Life and Philosophy, 1890
- Religion in Board Schools, leaflet, 1894
- Our Children, broadsheet, 1895
- A Concise History of Religions, (3 vols) 1893-7
- Children's Book of Moral Lessons, (4 vols) 1897
- History of Leicester Secular Society, 1900
- The Religion that Fulfils: a simple account of Positivism, 1905
- Funeral Services without Theology, 1906
- On the Threshold of Sex, 1909
- Youth's Noble Path, 1910
- Brave Citizens, 1911
- Noble Pages from German History, 1913
- Common Sense Thoughts on a Life Beyond, 1918
- Health and Honour, 1919
- Auguste Comte, 1920
- The Life-Story of a Humanist, 1923

== Collections ==
Gould's personal papers are held at University College London's Institute of Education. The collections include pamphlets, press cuttings, and correspondence.
