= Annie Besant =

English writer and activist (1847–1933)

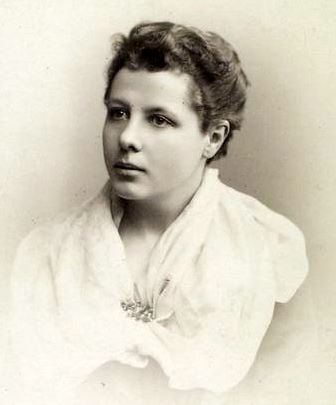
- Annie Besant as a young woman
- Born: Annie Wood; 1 October 1847; Clapham, London, England
- Died: 20 September 1933 (aged 85); Adyar, Madras Presidency, British India
- Known for: Theosophist, women's rights activist, writer and orator
- Political party: Indian National Congress; Social Democratic Federation
- Movement: Irish Home Rule; Indian independence movement
- Spouse: Frank Besant (m. 1867; div. 1873)
- Children: Arthur, Mabel, Jiddu Krishnamurti (adopted)

Annie Besant (/ˈbɛzənt/; née Wood; 1 October 1847 – 20 September 1933) was an English socialist, theosophist, freemason, educationist, and activist involved in women's rights, Home Rule, and Indian nationalism. She supported Irish and Indian self-rule. She became the first female president of the Indian National Congress in 1917.

She became a prominent speaker for the National Secular Society (NSS), a writer, and a close friend of Charles Bradlaugh. In 1877 they were prosecuted for publishing a book by birth control campaigner Charles Knowlton. Thereafter, she became involved with union actions, including the Bloody Sunday demonstration and the London matchgirls strike of 1888. She was a leading speaker for both the Fabian Society and the Marxist Social Democratic Federation (SDF). She was also elected to the London School Board for Tower Hamlets, topping the poll, even though few women were qualified to vote then.

In 1890 Besant met Helena Blavatsky, and over the next few years her interest in theosophy grew, whilst her interest in secular matters waned. She became a member of the Theosophical Society and a prominent lecturer on the subject. As part of her theosophy-related work, she travelled to India. In 1898 she helped establish the Central Hindu School, and in 1922 she helped establish the Hyderabad (Sind) National Collegiate Board in Bombay (today's Mumbai), India. The Theosophical Society Auditorium in Hyderabad, Sindh (Sindh) is called Besant Hall in her honour. In 1902, she established the first overseas Lodge of the International Order of Co-Freemasonry, Le Droit Humain. Over the next few years, she established lodges in many parts of the British Empire. In 1907 she became president of the Theosophical Society, whose international headquarters were, by then, located in Adyar, Madras (Chennai).

Besant also became active in politics in India, joining the Indian National Congress. When World War I broke out in 1914, she helped launch the Home Rule League to campaign for democracy in India, and dominion status within the British Empire. This led to her election as president of the Indian National Congress in late 1917. In the late 1920s, Besant travelled to the United States with her protégé and adopted son Jiddu Krishnamurti, whom she claimed was the new Messiah and incarnation of Buddha. Krishnamurti rejected these claims in 1929. After the war, she continued to campaign for Indian independence and for the causes of theosophy. She died in 1933.

== Early life ==
Annie Wood was born on 1 October 1847 in London, the daughter of William Burton Persse Wood (1816–1852) and his wife Emily Roche Morris (died 1874). Her father was English, attended Trinity College Dublin, and attained a medical degree; her mother was an Irish Catholic. Her paternal grandfather Robert Wright Wood was a brother of Sir Matthew Wood, 1st Baronet.

Wood's father died in her early childhood, leaving a son, Henry Trueman Wood, and Annie, his one daughter. Her mother supported Henry's education at Harrow School by running a boarding house there. Annie was fostered by Ellen Marryat, sister of the author Frederick Marryat, who ran a school at Charmouth, until age 16. She returned to her mother at Harrow self-confident, aware of a sense of duty to society, and under the influence of the Tractarians. As a young woman, she was also able to travel in Europe.

In summer 1867, Wood and her mother stayed at Pendleton near Manchester with the radical solicitor William Prowting Roberts, who questioned Wood's political assumptions. In December of that year, at age 20, Annie married the cleric Frank Besant (1840–1917), younger brother of Walter Besant, an evangelical, serious Anglican.

== Marriage and separation ==
The Rev. Frank Besant was a graduate of Emmanuel College, Cambridge, ordained priest in 1866, but had no living: in 1866 he was teaching at Stockwell Grammar School as second master, and in 1867 he moved to teach at Cheltenham College as assistant master. In 1872, he became vicar of Sibsey in Lincolnshire, a benefice in the gift of the Lord Chancellor—who was Lord Hatherley, a Wood family connection, son of Sir Matthew Wood, 1st Baronet. The Besant family, with their two children, Arthur and Mabel, moved to Sibsey, but the marriage was already under strain. As Besant wrote in her Autobiography, "we were an ill-matched pair".

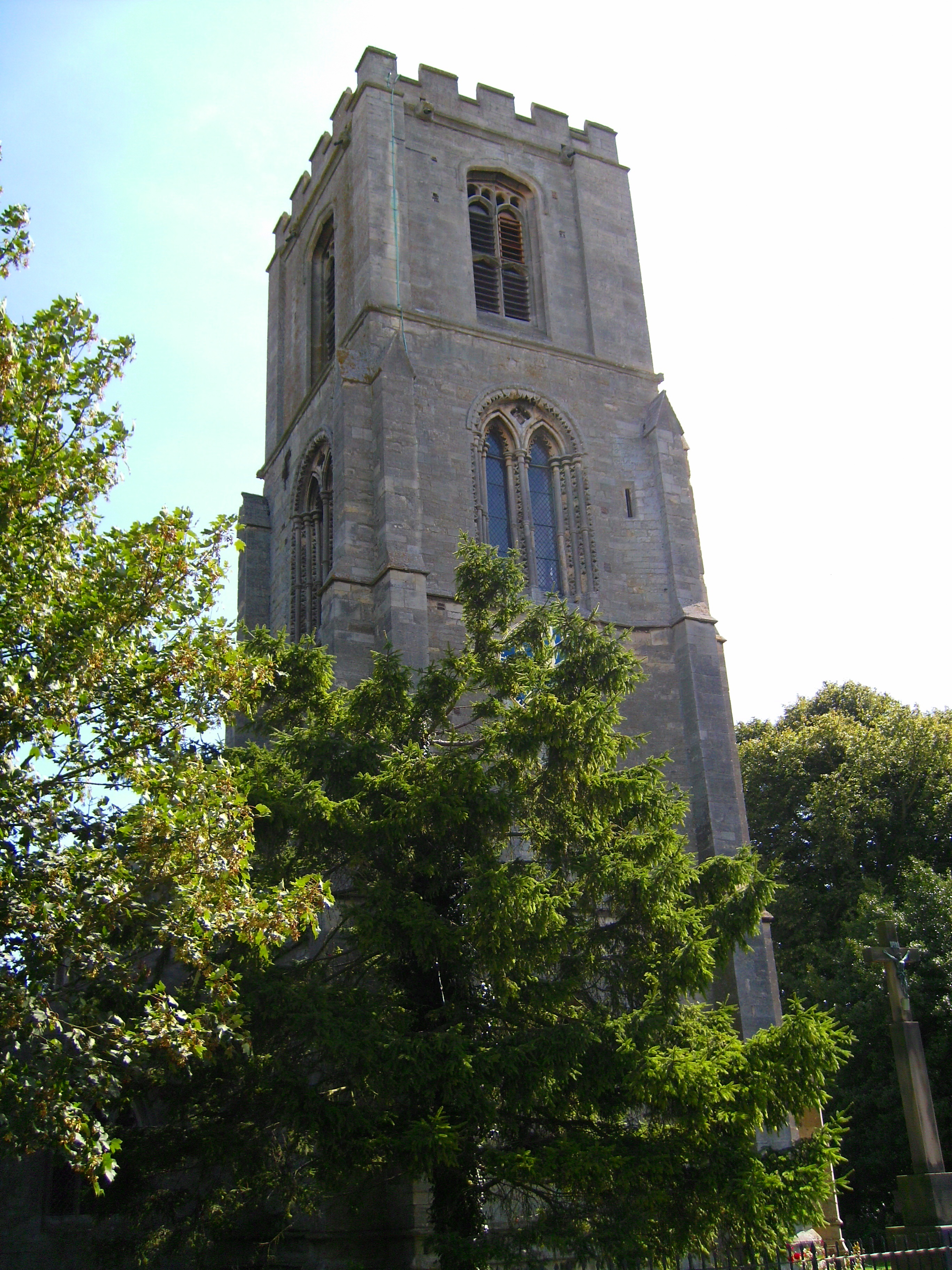
St. Margaret's church in Sibsey, Lincolnshire, where Frank Besant was vicar from 1872 to 1917

Money was short, and Frank Besant was stingy. Annie Besant was sure a third child would strain the family finances too much. She wrote short stories, children's books, and articles, but her husband controlled the money she earned.

Besant began to question her own faith after her daughter Mabel was seriously ill in 1871. She consulted Edward Bouverie Pusey: by post he gave her advice along orthodox, Bampton Lecture lines, and in person he sharply reprimanded her unorthodox theological tendencies. She attended in London, with her mother, a service at St George's Hall given by the heterodox cleric Charles Voysey, in autumn 1871, and struck up an acquaintance with the Voyseys, reading in "theistic" authors such as Theodore Parker and Francis Newman on Voysey's recommendation. Voysey also introduced Besant to the freethinker and publisher Thomas Scott. Encouraged by Scott, Besant wrote an anonymous pamphlet On the Deity of Jesus of Nazareth, by "the wife of a beneficed clergyman", which appeared in 1872. Ellen Dana Conway, wife of Moncure Conway befriended Annie at this time.

The Besants tried much to repair the marriage. The tension came to a head when Annie Besant refused to attend Communion, which Frank Besant demanded, now fearing for his own reputation and position in the Church. In 1873 she left him and went to London. She had a temporary place to stay, with Moncure Conway. The Scotts found her a small house in Colby Road, Upper Norwood.

The couple were legally separated and Annie Besant took her daughter Mabel with her, the agreement of 25 October 1873 giving her custody. Annie continued to be called Mrs. Besant for the rest of her life. On her arrival in London, Besant attempted to support her daughter, her mother (who died the following year) and herself with needlework. She also got a small allowance from her husband.

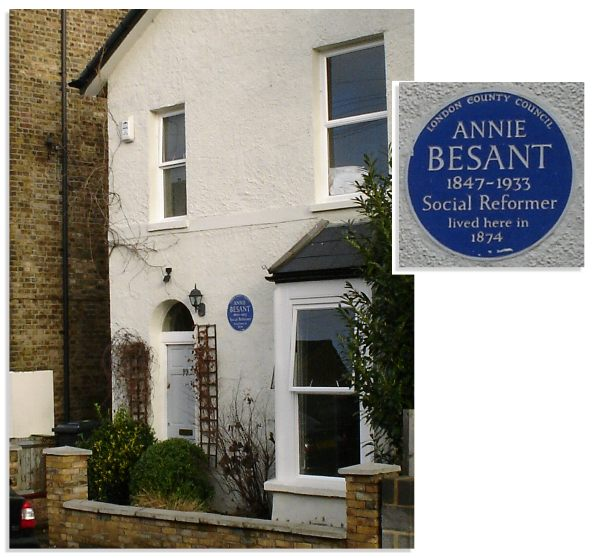
Annie Besant's house, 39 Colby Road, Upper Norwood, now bearing a blue plaque

At first, as well as having Mabel living with her, Annie had contact with her son. In 1878, Frank Besant successfully argued that she was an unfit mother, after Annie Besant's public campaigning on contraception, and from then on had custody of both children. Later, Annie Besant was reconciled with her son and daughter. Her son Arthur Digby Besant (1869–1960) took up a career as an actuary, was eventually President of the Institute of Actuaries, 1924–26, and wrote The Besant Pedigree (1930).

== Reformer and secularist ==
Besant began in 1874 to write for the National Reformer, the organ of the National Secular Society (NSS), run by Charles Bradlaugh. She also continued to write for Thomas Scott's small press. On the account given by W. T. Stead, Besant had encountered the National Reformer on sale in the shop of Edward Truelove. Besant had heard of Bradlaugh from Moncure Conway. She wrote to Bradlaugh and was accepted as an NSS member. She first heard him speak on 2 August 1874. Through Bradlaugh, Besant met and became a supporter of Joseph Arch, the farmworkers' leader.

Her career as a platform speaker began on 25 August 1874, with the topic "The Political Status of Women". The lecture was at the Co-operative Hall, Castle Street, Long Acre in Covent Garden. It was followed in September by an invitation from Moncure Conway to speak at his Camden Town church on "The True Basis of Morality". Besant published an essay under this title, in 1882. She was a prolific writer and a powerful orator. She addressed causes including freedom of thought, women's rights, secularism, birth control, Fabian socialism and workers' rights. Margaret Cole called her "the finest woman orator and organiser of her day".

=== Criticism of Christianity ===
Besant opined that for centuries the leaders of Christian thought spoke of women as a necessary evil and that the greatest saints of the Church were those who despised women the most. "Against the teachings of eternal torture, of the vicarious atonement, of the infallibility of the Bible, I leveled all the strength of my brain and tongue, and I exposed the history of the Christian Church with unsparing hand, its persecutions, its religious wars, its cruelties, its oppressions." In the section named "Its Evidences Unreliable" of her work "Christianity", Besant presents the case of why the Gospels are not authentic: "before about A.D. 180 there is no trace of FOUR gospels among the Christians."

=== The Fruits of Philosophy ===
Besant and Bradlaugh set up the Freethought Publishing Company at the beginning of 1877; it followed the 1876 prosecution of Charles Watts, and they carried on his work. They became household names later that year, when they published Fruits of Philosophy, a book by the American birth-control campaigner Charles Knowlton. It claimed that working-class families could never be happy until they were able to decide how many children they wanted. It also suggested ways to limit the size of their families. The Knowlton book was highly controversial and was vigorously opposed by the Church. Besant and Bradlaugh proclaimed in the National Reformer:

We intend to publish nothing we do not think we can morally defend. All that we publish we shall defend.

The pair were arrested and put on trial for publishing the Knowlton book. They were found guilty but released pending appeal. The trial became a cause célèbre, and ultimately the verdict was overturned on a technical legal point.

Besant was then instrumental in founding the Malthusian League, reviving a name coined earlier by Bradlaugh. It would go on to advocate for the abolition of penalties for the promotion of contraception. Besant and Bradlaugh supported the Malthusian League for some 12 years. They were concerned with birth control, but were not neo-Malthusians in the sense of convinced believers in the tradition of Thomas Malthus and his demographic theories. Besant did advocate population control as an antidote to the struggle for survival. She became the secretary of the League, with Charles Robert Drysdale as President. In time the League veered towards eugenics, and it was from the outset an individualist organisation, also for many members supportive of a social conservatism that was not Besant's view. Her pamphlet The Law of Population (1878) sold well.

=== Radical causes ===
Besant was a leading member of the National Secular Society alongside Charles Bradlaugh. She attacked the status of the Church of England as established church. The NSS argued for a secular state and an end to the special status of Christianity and allowed her to act as one of its public speakers. On 6 March 1881 she spoke at the opening of Leicester Secular Society's new Secular Hall in Humberstone Gate, Leicester. The other speakers were George Jacob Holyoake, Harriet Law and Bradlaugh.

Bradlaugh was elected to Parliament in 1881. Because of his atheism, he asked to be allowed to affirm, rather than swear the oath of loyalty. It took more than six years before the matter was completely resolved, in Bradlaugh's favour, after a series of by-elections and court appearances. He was an individualist and opposed to socialism in any form. While he defended free speech, he was very cautious about encouraging working-class militancy.

Edward Aveling, a rising star in the National Secular Society, tutored Besant during 1879, and she went on to a degree course at London University. Then, 1879 to 1882, she was a student of physical sciences at Birkbeck Literary and Scientific Institution. Embarrassed by her activist reputation, the Institution omitted her name from the published list of graduands, and mailed her certificates to her. When Aveling in a speech in 1884 announced he had become a socialist after five years' close study, Besant argued that his politics over that whole period had been aligned with Bradlaugh's and her own. Aveling and Eleanor Marx joined the Social Democratic Federation, followers of Marxism, and then the Socialist League, a small Marxist splinter group which formed around the artist William Morris. In 1883 Besant started her own periodical, Our Corner. It was a literary and in time a socialist monthly, and published George Bernard Shaw's novel The Irrational Knot in serial form.

Meanwhile, Besant built close contacts with the Irish Home Rulers and supported them in her newspaper columns during what are considered crucial years, when the Irish nationalists were forming an alliance with Liberals and Radicals. Besant met the leaders of the Irish home rule movement. In particular, she got to know Michael Davitt, who wanted to mobilise the Irish peasantry through a Land War, a direct struggle against the landowners. She spoke and wrote in favour of Davitt and his Land League many times over the coming decades.

=== Personal life ===
Bradlaugh's family circumstances changed in May 1877 with the death of his wife Susannah, an alcoholic who had left him for James Thomson. His two children, Alice then aged 21, and Hypatia then 19, returned to live with him from his in-laws. He had been able to take a house in St John's Wood in February of that year, at 20 Circus Road, near Besant. They continued what had become a close friendship.

== Fabian Society 1885–1890 ==
Besant made an abrupt public change in her political views, at the 1885 New Year's Day meeting of the London Dialectical Society, founded by Joseph Hiam Levy to promote individualist views. It followed a noted public debate at St. James's Hall on 17 April 1884, on Will Socialism Benefit the English People?, in which Bradlaugh had put individualist views, against the Marxist line of Henry Hyndman. On that occasion Besant still supported Bradlaugh. While Bradlaugh may have had the better of the debate, followers then began to migrate into left-wing politics. George Bernard Shaw was the speaker on 1 January 1885, talking on socialism, but, instead of the expected criticism from Besant, he saw her opposing his opponent. Shaw then sponsored Besant to join the Fabian Society.

The Fabians were defining political goals, rejecting anarchism in 1886, and forming the Fabian Parliamentary League, with both Besant and Shaw on its Council which promoted political candidacy. Unemployment was a central issue of the time, and in 1887 some of the London unemployed started to hold protests in Trafalgar Square. Besant agreed to appear as a speaker at a meeting on 13 November. The police tried to stop the assembly, fighting broke out, and troops were called. Many were hurt, one man died, and hundreds were arrested; Besant offered herself for arrest, an offer disregarded by the police. The events became known as Bloody Sunday. Besant threw herself into organising legal aid for the jailed workers and support for their families. In its aftermath the Law and Liberty League, defending freedom of expression, was formed by Besant and others, and Besant became editor of The Link, its journal.

Besant's involvement in the London matchgirls strike of 1888 came after a Fabian Society talk that year on female labour by Clementina Black. Besant wrote in The Link about conditions at the Bryant & May match factory. She was drawn further into this battle of the "New Unionism" by a young socialist, Herbert Burrows, who had made contact with workers at the factory, in Bow. They were mainly young women, were very poorly paid, and subject to occupational disease, such as Phossy jaw caused by the chemicals used in match manufacture. Louise Raw in Striking a Light (2011) has, however, contested the historiography of the strike, stating that "A proper examination of the primary evidence about the strike makes it impossible to continue to believe that Annie Besant led it."

William Morris played some part in converting Besant to Marxism, but it was to the Social Democratic Federation of Hyndman, not his Socialist League, that she turned in 1888. She remained a member for a number of years and became one of its leading speakers. She was still a member of the Fabian Society, the two movements being compatible at the time. Besant was elected to the London School Board in 1888. Women at that time were not able to take part in parliamentary politics but had been brought into the London local electorate in 1881. Besant drove about with a red ribbon in her hair, speaking at meetings. "No more hungry children", her manifesto proclaimed. She combined her socialist principles with feminism:

"I ask the electors to vote for me, and the non-electors to work for me because women are wanted on the Board and there are too few women candidates."

From the early 1880s Besant had also been an important feminist leader in London, with Alice Vickery, Ellen Dana Moncure and Millicent Fawcett. This group, at the South Place Ethical Society, had a national standing. She frequented the home of Richard and Emmeline Pankhurst on Russell Square, and Emmeline had participated in the matchgirl organisation. Besant came out on top of the poll in Tower Hamlets, with over 15,000 votes. She wrote in the National Reformer:

"Ten years ago, under a cruel law, Christian bigotry robbed me of my little child. Now the care of the 763,680 children of London is placed partly in my hands."

Financial constraints meant that Besant closed down both Our Corner and The Link at the end of 1888.

Besant was further involved in the London dock strike of 1889. The dockers, casual workers who were employed by the day, were led by Ben Tillett in a struggle for the "Dockers' Tanner". Besant helped Tillett draw up the union's rules and played an important part in the meetings and agitation which built up the organisation. She spoke for the dockers at public meetings and on street corners. Like the match-girls, the dockers won public support for their struggle, and the strike was won.

== Theosophy ==
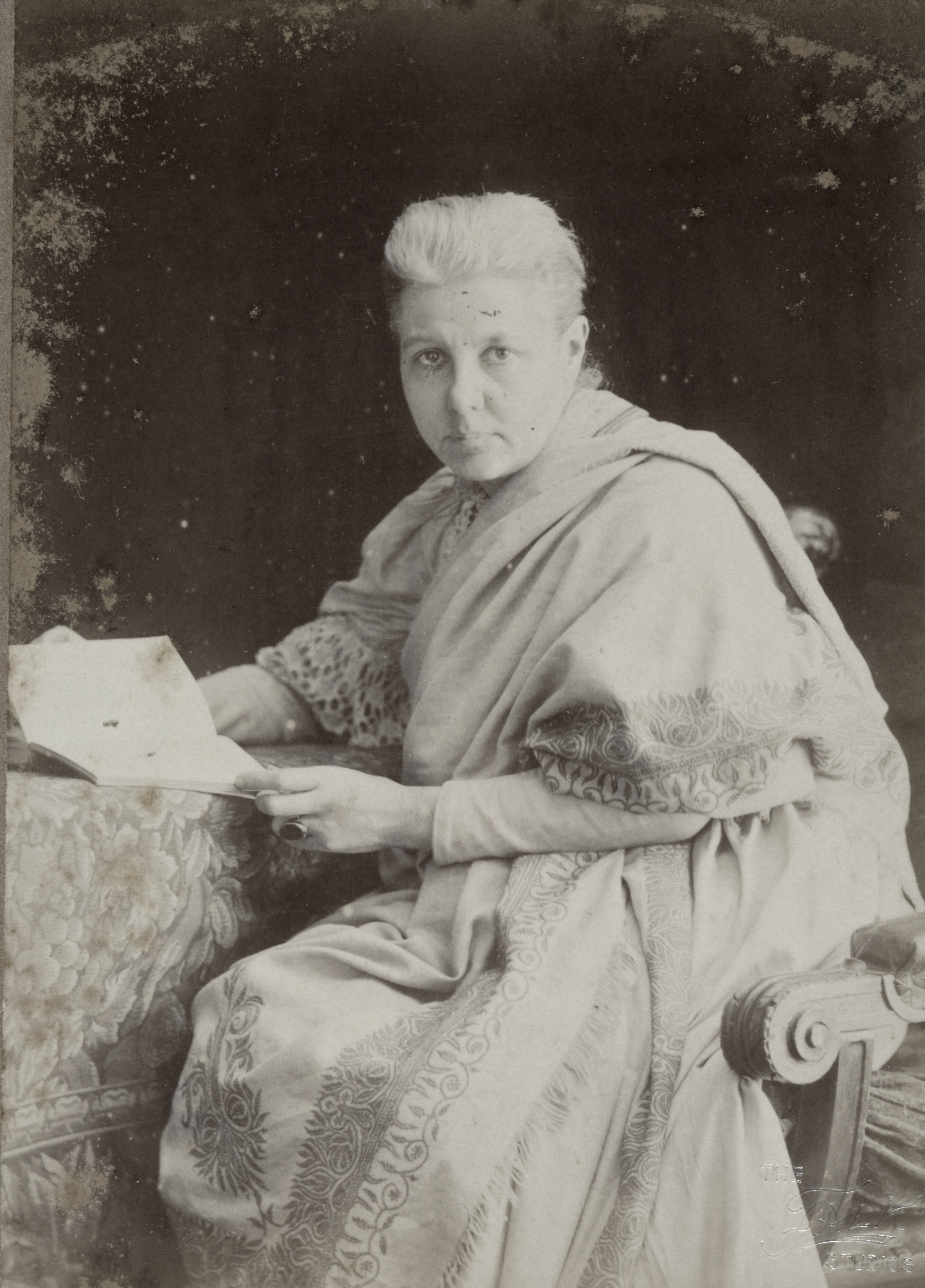
Studio portrait of Besant, c. 1910

In 1889, Besant was asked to write a review for the Pall Mall Gazette on The Secret Doctrine, a book by H. P. Blavatsky. After reading it, she sought an interview with its author, meeting Blavatsky in Paris. In this way, she was converted to Theosophy. She allowed her membership of the Fabian Society to lapse (1890) and broke her links with the Marxists.

In her Autobiography, Besant follows her chapter on "Socialism" with "Through Storm to Peace", the peace of Theosophy. In 1888, she described herself as "marching toward the Theosophy" that would be the "glory" of her life. Besant had found the economic side of life lacking a spiritual dimension, so she searched for a belief based on "Love". She found this in Theosophy, so she joined the Theosophical Society, a move that distanced her from Bradlaugh and other former activist co-workers. When Blavatsky died in 1891, Besant was left as one of the leading figures in theosophy and in 1893 she represented it at the Chicago World Fair.

In 1893, soon after becoming a member of the Theosophical Society, she went to India for the first time. After a dispute the American section split away into an independent organisation. The original society, then led by Henry Steel Olcott and Besant, is today based in Chennai, India, and is known as the Theosophical Society Adyar. Following the split, Besant devoted much of her energy not only to the society but also to India's freedom and progress. Besant Nagar, a neighbourhood near the Theosophical Society in Chennai, is named in her honour.

In 1893, she was a representative of The Theosophical Society at the World Parliament of Religions in Chicago. The World Parliament is famous in India because Indian monk Swami Vivekananda addressed the same event.

In September 1894, Besant arrived in Australia, where she lectured in Melbourne and Sydney. In October 1894, she wrote back to the Adyar headquarters from Dunedin, New Zealand, claiming to have reformed the Theosophical Society in Australasia. At the Society's Australasian convention in the same year, her followers forced William Quan Judge to resign as vice-president; he left the Society in April 1895 together with the entire US section.

In 1895, together with the founder-president of the Theosophical Society, Henry Steel Olcott, as well as Marie Musaeus Higgins and Peter De Abrew, she was instrumental in developing the Buddhist school, Musaeus College, in Colombo on the island of Sri Lanka.

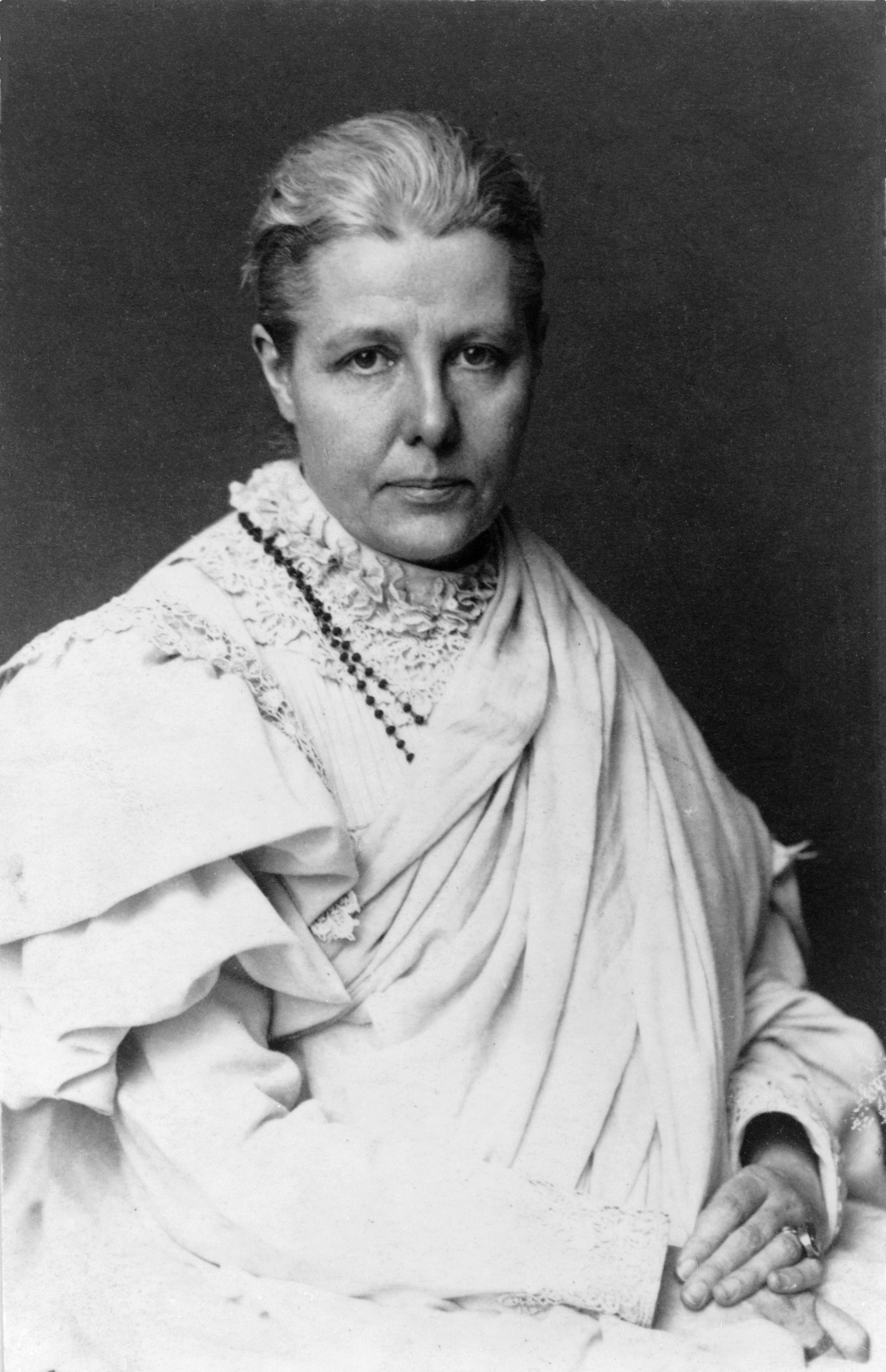
Annie Besant, c. 1897

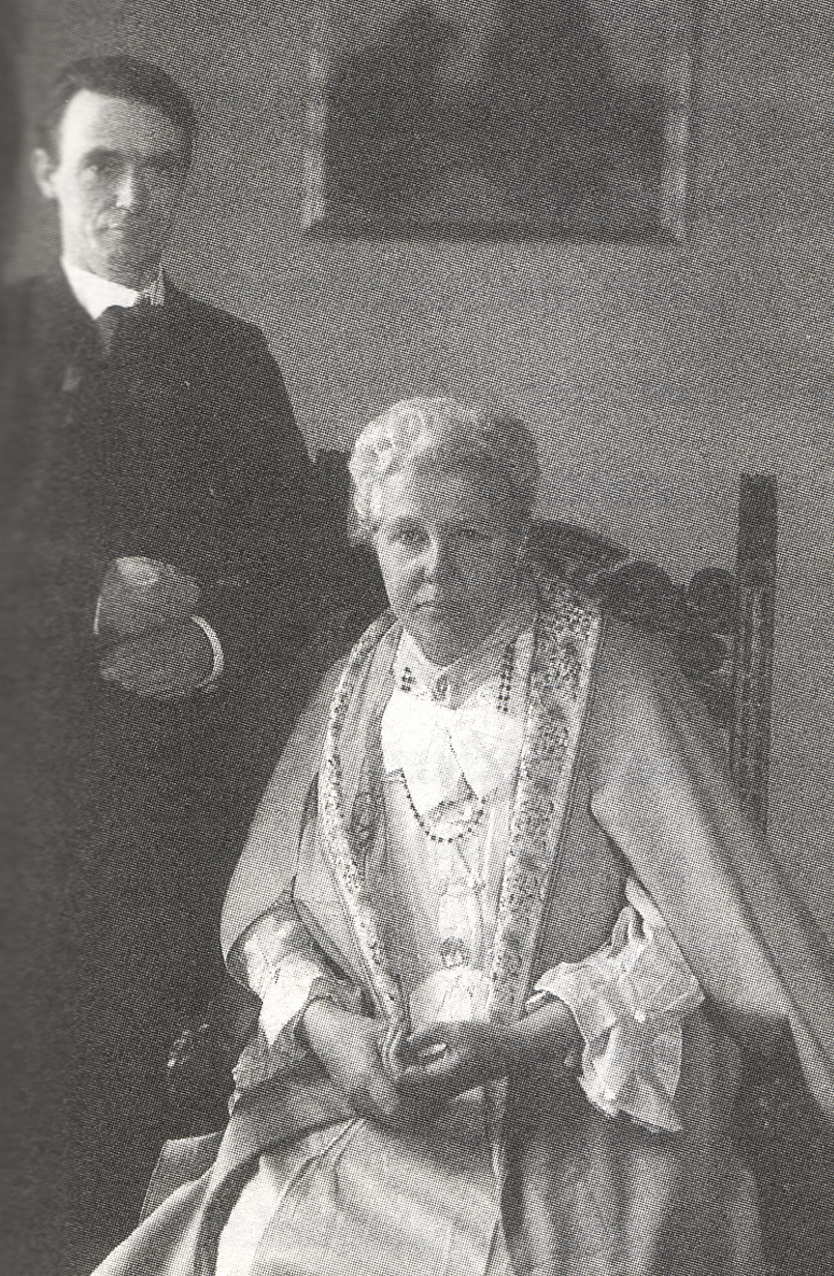
Rudolf Steiner and Annie Besant in Munich, 1907

=== Co-freemasonry ===
Besant saw freemasonry, in particular Co-Freemasonry, as an extension of her interest in the rights of women and the greater brotherhood of man and saw co-freemasonry as a "movement which practised true brotherhood, in which women and men worked side by side for the perfecting of humanity. She immediately wanted to be admitted to this organisation", known now as the International Order of Freemasonry for Men and Women, "Le Droit Humain".

The link was made in 1902 by the theosophist Francesca Arundale, who accompanied Besant to Paris, along with six friends. "They were all initiated, passed, and raised into the first three degrees and Annie returned to England, bearing a Charter and founded there the first Lodge of International Mixed Masonry, Le Droit Humain." Besant eventually became the Order's Most Puissant Grand Commander and was a major influence in the international growth of the Order.

=== President of Theosophical Society ===
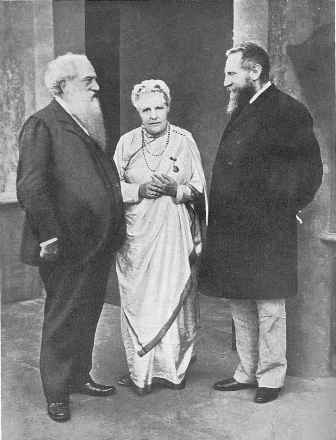
Annie Besant with Henry Olcott (left) and Charles Leadbeater (right) in Adyar, Madras in December 1905

Besant met fellow theosophist Charles Webster Leadbeater in London in April 1894. They became close co-workers in the theosophical movement and would remain so for the rest of their lives. Leadbeater claimed clairvoyance and reputedly helped Besant become clairvoyant herself in the following year. In a letter dated 25 August 1895 to Francisca Arundale, Leadbeater narrates how Besant became clairvoyant. Together they clairvoyantly investigated the universe, matter, thought-forms, and the history of mankind, and co-authored a book called Occult Chemistry.

In 1906 Leadbeater became the centre of controversy when it emerged that he had advised the practice of masturbation to some boys under his care and spiritual instruction. Leadbeater stated he had encouraged the practice to keep the boys celibate, which was considered a prerequisite for advancement on the spiritual path. Because of the controversy, he offered to resign from the Theosophical Society in 1906, which was accepted. The next year Besant became president of the society and in 1908, with her express support, Leadbeater was readmitted to the society. Leadbeater went on to face accusations of improper relations with boys, but none of the accusations were ever proven and Besant never deserted him.

Until Besant's presidency, the society had as one of its foci Theravada Buddhism and the island of Sri Lanka, where Henry Olcott did the majority of his useful work. Under Besant's leadership there was more stress on the teachings of "The Aryavarta", as she called central India, as well as on esoteric Christianity.

Besant set up a new school for boys, the Central Hindu College (CHC) at Banaras which was formed on underlying theosophical principles, and which counted many prominent theosophists in its staff and faculty. Its aim was to build a new leadership for India. The students spent 90 minutes a day in prayer and studied religious texts, but they also studied modern science. It took 3 years to raise the money for the CHC, most of which came from Indian princes. In April 1911, Besant met Pandit Madan Mohan Malaviya and they decided to unite their forces and work for a common Hindu University at Banaras. Besant and fellow trustees of the Central Hindu College also agreed to the Government of India's precondition that the college should become a part of the new University. The Banaras Hindu University started functioning from 1 October 1917 with the Central Hindu College as its first constituent college.

Blavatsky had stated in 1889 that the main purpose of establishing the society was to prepare humanity for the future reception of a "torch-bearer of Truth", an emissary of a hidden Spiritual Hierarchy that, according to theosophists, guides the evolution of mankind. This was repeated by Besant as early as 1896; Besant came to believe in the imminent appearance of the "emissary", who was identified by theosophists as the so-called World Teacher.

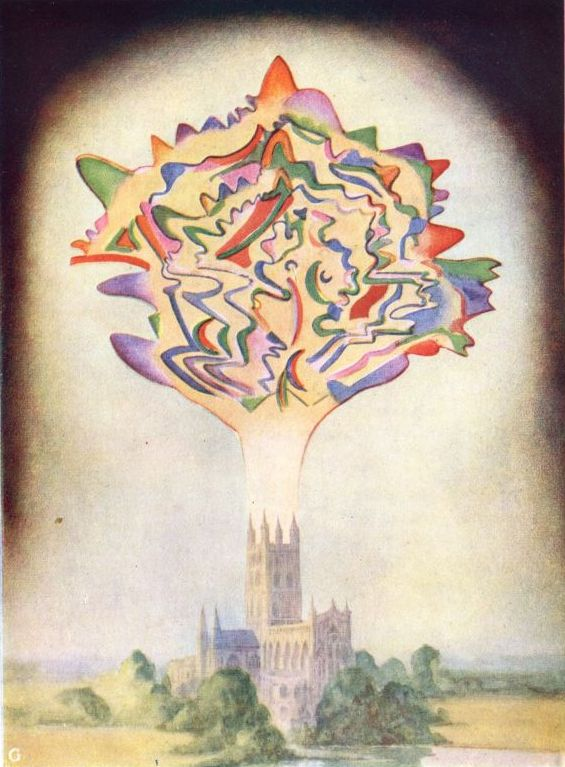
Thought-form of the music of Charles Gounod, according to Besant and C. W. Leadbeater in Thought-Forms (1905)

=== "World Teacher" project ===
In 1909, soon after Besant's assumption of the presidency, Leadbeater "discovered" fourteen-year-old Jiddu Krishnamurti (1895–1986), a South Indian boy who had been living, with his father and brother, on the grounds of the headquarters of the Theosophical Society at Adyar, and declared him the probable "vehicle" for the expected "World Teacher". The "discovery" and its objective received widespread publicity and attracted a worldwide following, mainly among theosophists. It also started years of upheaval and contributed to splits in the Theosophical Society and doctrinal schisms in theosophy. Following the discovery, Jiddu Krishnamurti and his younger brother Nityananda ("Nitya") were placed under the care of theosophists and Krishnamurti was extensively groomed for his future mission as the new vehicle for the "World Teacher". Besant soon became the boys' legal guardian with the consent of their father, who was very poor and could not take care of them. However, his father later changed his mind and began a legal battle to regain guardianship, against the will of the boys. Early in their relationship, Krishnamurti and Besant had developed a very close bond and he considered her a surrogate mother – a role she happily accepted. (His biological mother had died when he was ten years old.)

In 1929, twenty years after his "discovery", Krishnamurti, who had grown disenchanted with the World Teacher Project, repudiated the role that many theosophists expected him to fulfil. He dissolved the Order of the Star in the East, an organisation founded to assist the World Teacher in his mission, and eventually left the Theosophical Society and theosophy at large. He spent the rest of his life travelling the world as an unaffiliated speaker, becoming in the process widely known as an original, independent thinker on philosophical, psychological, and spiritual subjects. His love for Besant never waned, as also was the case with Besant's feelings towards him; concerned for his wellbeing after he declared his independence, she had purchased 6 acres (2.4 ha) of land near the Theosophical Society estate which later became the headquarters of the Krishnamurti Foundation India.

== Home Rule movement ==
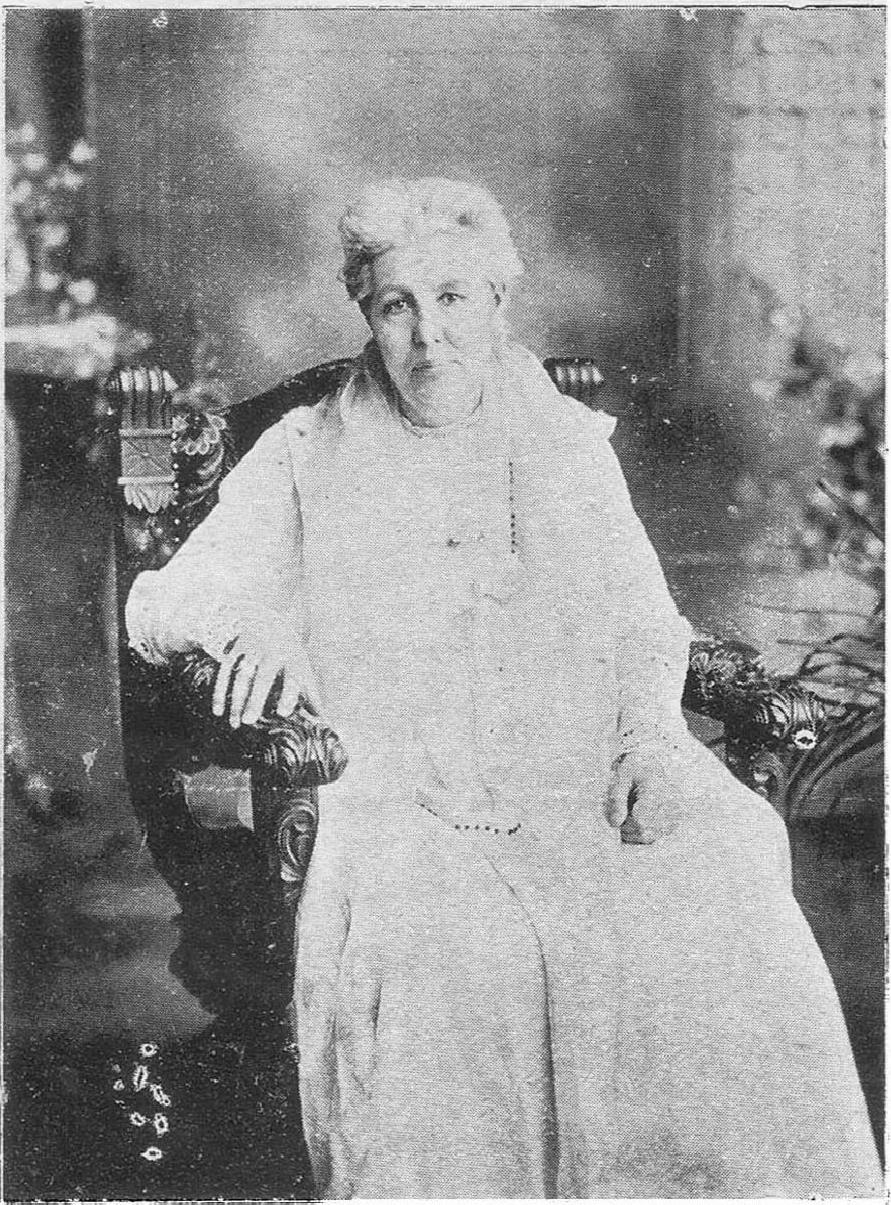
Besant in Andhra Patrika, the weekly newspaper of the nationalist movement in the Telugu speaking region (1911)

As early as 1902 Besant had written that "India is not ruled for the prospering of the people, but rather for the profit of her conquerors, and her sons are being treated as a conquered race." She encouraged Indian national consciousness, attacked caste and child marriage, and worked effectively for Indian education. Along with her theosophical activities, Besant continued to actively participate in political matters. She had joined the Indian National Congress. As the name suggested, this was originally a debating body, which met each year to consider resolutions on political issues. Mostly it demanded more of a say for middle-class Indians in British Indian government. It had not yet developed into a permanent mass movement with a local organisation. About this time her co-worker Leadbeater moved to Sydney.

In 1914, World War I broke out, and Britain asked for the support of its Empire in the fight against Germany. Echoing an Irish nationalist slogan, Besant declared, "England's need is India's opportunity". As editor of the New India newspaper, she attacked the colonial government of India and called for clear and decisive moves towards self-rule. As with Ireland, the government refused to discuss any changes while the war lasted.

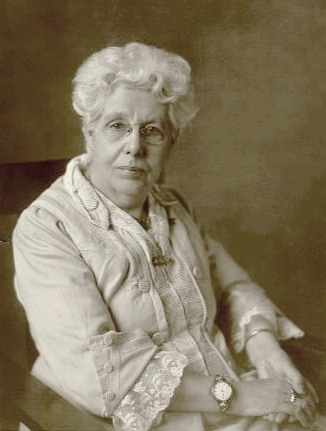
Annie Besant in Sydney, 1922

In 1916, Besant launched the All India Home Rule League along with Lokmanya Tilak, once again modelling demands for India on Irish nationalist practices. This was the first political party in India to have regime change as its main goal. Unlike the Congress itself, the League worked all year round. It built a structure of local branches, enabling it to mobilise demonstrations, public meetings, and agitations. In June 1917, Besant was arrested and interned at a hill station, where she defiantly flew a red and green flag. The Congress and the Muslim League together threatened to launch protests if she were not set free; Besant's arrest had created a focus for protest.

The government was forced to give way and to make vague but significant concessions. It was announced that the ultimate aim of British rule was Indian self-government, and moves in that direction were promised. Besant was freed in September 1917, welcomed by crowds all over India, and in December she took over as president of the Indian National Congress for a year. Both Jawaharlal Nehru and Mahatma Gandhi spoke of Besant's influence with admiration.

After the war, a new leadership of the Indian National Congress emerged around Mahatma Gandhi – one of those who had written to demand Besant's release. He was a lawyer who had returned from leading Asians in a peaceful struggle against racism in South Africa. Jawaharlal Nehru, Gandhi's closest collaborator, had been educated by a theosophist tutor.

The new leadership was committed to action that was both militant and non-violent, but there were differences between them and Besant. Despite her past, she was not happy with their socialist leanings. Until the end of her life, however, she continued to campaign for India's independence, not only in India but also on speaking tours of Britain. In her own version of Indian dress, she remained a striking presence on speakers' platforms. She produced a torrent of letters and articles demanding independence.

== Later years and death ==
Besant tried as a person, theosophist, and president of the Theosophical Society, to accommodate Krishnamurti's views into her life, without success; she vowed to personally follow him in his new direction although she apparently had trouble understanding both his motives and his new message. The two remained friends until the end of her life.

In 1931, she became ill in India.

Besant died on 20 September 1933, at age 85, in Adyar, Madras Presidency, British India. Her body was cremated.

She was survived by her daughter, Mabel. After her death, colleagues Jiddu Krishnamurti, Aldous Huxley, Guido Ferrando, and Rosalind Rajagopal, built the Happy Valley School in California, now renamed the Besant Hill School of Happy Valley in her honour.

== Legacy ==
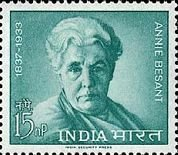
Stamp of India 1963 Commemoration Annie Besant 1847-1933

Widely recognized as a pioneer of women's birth control and for her contributions to the Indian freedom movement, roads have been named in her honour in the Indian cities Mumbai and Patna. The Besant Road in the city of Vijayawada was named after her. In Chennai, a residential neighborhood, Besant Nagar, and an urban park, the Dr. Annie Besant Park, have also been named in her honour.

The Besant Theosophical College, established in 1917, in Madanapalle is one of the oldest colleges in the Rayalaseema region of Andhra Pradesh, India. In 2023, plans were announced to upgrade this college to a university called the Annie Besant University.

== Recognition in popular media ==
On 1 October 2015, search engine Google commemorated Annie Besant with a Doodle on her 168th birth anniversary. Google commented: "A fierce advocate of Indian self-rule, Annie Besant loved the language, and over a lifetime of vigorous study cultivated tremendous abilities as a writer and orator. She published mountains of essays, wrote a textbook, curated anthologies of classic literature for young adults and eventually became editor of the New India newspaper, a periodical dedicated to the cause of Indian Autonomy".

In his book, Rebels Against the Raj, Ramchandra Guha tells the story of how Besant and six other foreigners served India in its quest for independence from the British Raj.

In 2016, an exhibition called Intention to Know, focusing on Besant's "thought forms", was curated at the Stony Island Arts Bank, Chicago.

== Works ==
Besides being a prolific writer, Besant was a "practised stump orator" who gave sixty-six public lectures in one year. She also engaged in public debates.
List of Works on Online Books Annie Besant (Besant, Annie, 1847-1933) | The Online Books Page
List of Work on Open Library Annie Wood Besant

- The Political Status of Women (1874)
- Christianity: Its Evidences, Its Origin, Its Morality, Its History (1876)
- The Law of Population (1877)
- My Path to Atheism (1878, 3rd ed 1885)
- Marriage, As It Was, As It Is, And As It Should Be: A Plea for Reform (1878)
- Light, Heat and Sound (1881)
- The Atheistic Platform: 12 Lectures Nos. 1, 5, 9 and 12 by Besant (1884)
- Autobiographical Sketches (1885)
- Why I Am a Socialist (1886)
- Why I Became a Theosophist (1889)
- The Seven Principles of Man (1892)
- Bhagavad Gita (translated as The Lord's Song) (1895)
- Karma (1895)
- In the Outer Court(1895)
- The Ancient Wisdom (1897)
- Dharma (1898)
- Evolution of Life and Form (1898)
- Avatâras (1900)
- The Religious Problem in India (1901)
- Thought Power: Its Control and Culture (1901)
- A Study in Consciousness: A contribution to the science of psychology. (1904)
- Theosophy and the new psychology: A course of six lectures (1904)
- Thought Forms with C. W. Leadbeater (1905)
- Esoteric Christianity (1905 2nd ed)
- Death - and After? (1906)
- Occult Chemistry with C. W. Leadbeater (1908) Occult chemistry;: clairvoyant observations on the chemical elements
- An Introduction to Yoga (1908) An introduction to yoga; four lectures delivered at the 32nd anniversary of the Theosophical Society, held at Benares, on Dec. 27th, 28th, 29th, 30th, 1907
- Australian Lectures (1908)
- Annie Besant: An Autobiography (1908 2nd ed)
- The Religious Problem in India Lectures on Islam, Jainism, Sikhism, Theosophy (1909) The religious problem in India: four lectures delivered during the twenty-sixth annual convention of the Theosophical Society at Adyar, Madras, 1901
- Man and His Bodies (1896, rpt 1911) Theosophy: Man and His Bodies by Annie Besant
- Elementary Lessons on Karma (1912)
- A Study in Karma (1912)
- Initiation: The Perfecting of Man (1912) Theosophy: Initiation The Perfecting of Man by Annie Besant - MahatmaCWLeadbeater.org
- Giordano Bruno (1913)
- Man's Life in This and Other Worlds (1913) Man's life in this and other worlds
- Man: Whence, How and Whither with C. W. Leadbeater (1913) Man, whence, how and whither: a record of clairvoyant investigation / by Annie Besant and C.W. Leadbeater.
- Theosophy and Life's Deeper Problems 1916
- The Doctrine of the Heart (1920) Theosophy: Doctrine of the Heart by Annie Besant
- The Future of Indian Politics 1922
- The Life and Teaching of Muhammad (1932) Annie Besant The Life And Teachings Of Muhammad ( The Prophet Of Islam)
- Memory and Its Nature (1935) Memory and Its Nature - by Annie Besant & H.P.Blavatsky - Adyar Pamphlets No. 203 & 204

Selection of Pamphlets as follows: Pamphlets

- "Sin and Crime" (1885)
- "God's Views on Marriage" (1890)
- "A World Without God" (1885)
- "Life, Death, and Immortality" (1886)
- "Theosophy" (1925?)
- "The World and Its God" (1886)
- "Atheism and Its Bearing on Morals" (1887)
- "On Eternal Torture" (n.d.)
- "The Fruits of Christianity" (n.d.)
- "The Jesus of the Gospels and the Influence of Christianity" (n.d.)
- "The Gospel of Christianity and the Gospel of Freethought" (1883)
- "Sins of the Church: Threatenings and Slaughters" (n.d.)
- "For the Crown and Against the Nation" (1886)
- "Christian Progress" (1890)
- "Why I Do Not Believe in God" (1887)
- "The Myth of the Resurrection" (1886)
- "The Teachings of Christianity" (1887)

Indian National Movement

- The Commonweal (a weekly dealing on Indian national issues)
- New India (a daily newspaper which was a powerful mouthpiece for 15 years advocating Home Rule and revolutionizing Indian journalism)

See also

- Various writings regarding Helena Blavatsky (1889–1910) Blavatsky Archives contains 100s of articles on HP Blavatsky & Theosophy

== See also ==
- Agni Yoga
- Alice Bailey
- Benjamin Creme
- Helena Roerich
- History of feminism
- Order of the Star in the East
- Theosophy and Christianity
- Theosophy and visual arts

Party political offices
Preceded by Ambica Charan Mazumdar	President of the Indian National Congress; 1917	Succeeded by Madan Mohan Malaviya
