= Musaeus College =

Location
- Rosmead Place, Colombo 7 Sri Lanka; 6.9147°N 79.8686°E

Information
- Type: Private school
- Motto: Follow the Light
- Religious affiliation: Buddhist
- Established: 1891
- Founder: Marie Musaeus Higgins
- Principal: Sajeevanie Bandara
- Staff: 367
- Gender: Girls
- Age: 3 to 18
- Enrollment: 6,700
- Language: English and Sinhala
- Colours: Gold and blue
- Website: musaeus.lk

Musaeus College is a Buddhist private girls' school in Colombo, Sri Lanka. The school is named after its founding principal, Marie Musaeus Higgins, who served as the school's principal from 1891 to 1926. Musaeus College provides primary and secondary education to more than 6,500 girls from ages 3 to 18, and is managed by a board of trustees. The school's motto is "Follow the Light".

== Foundation ==
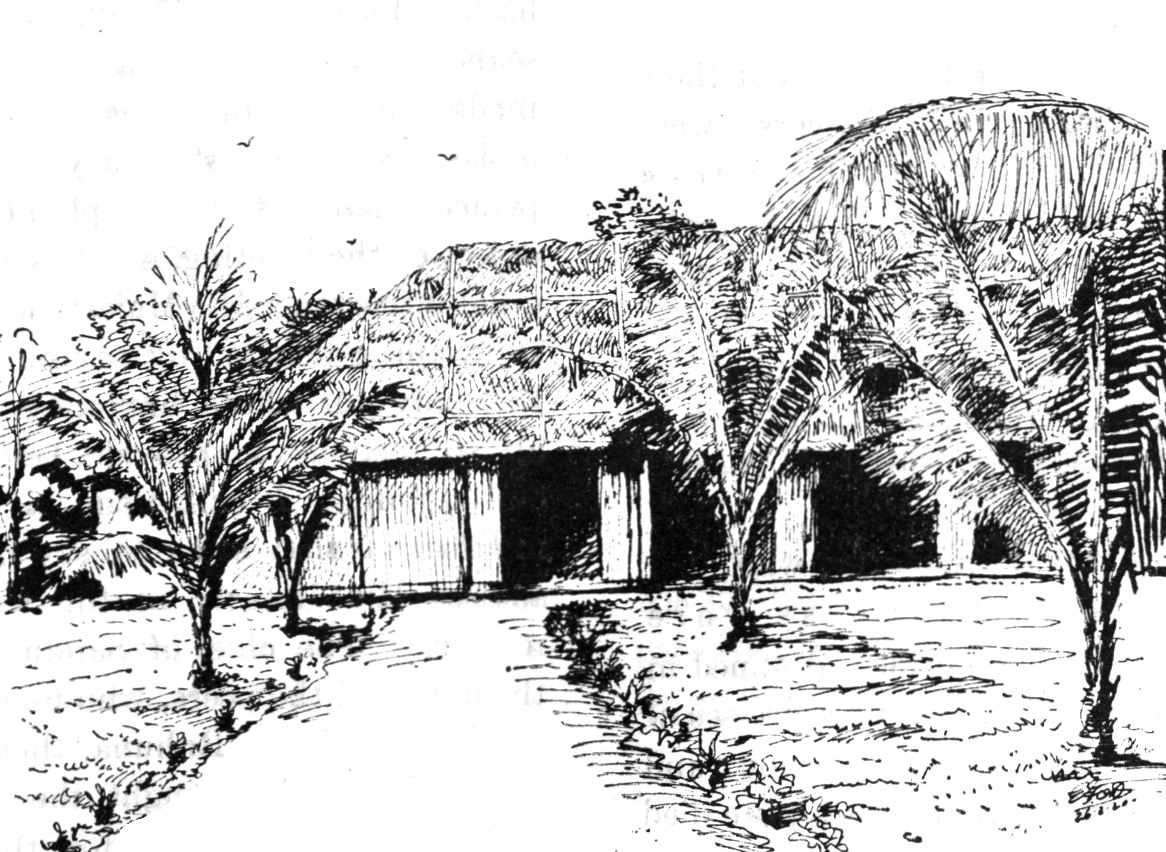
"Mud Palace" at Rosemead Place, Colombo, ca. 1895

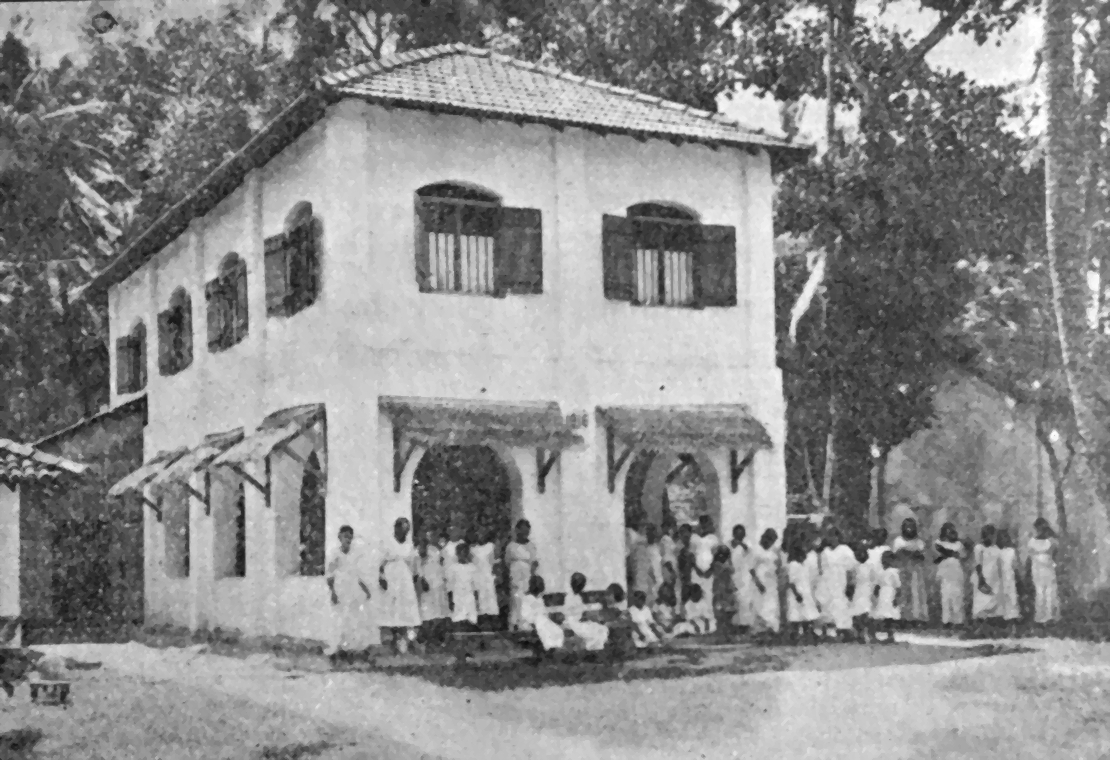
Training College (1920)

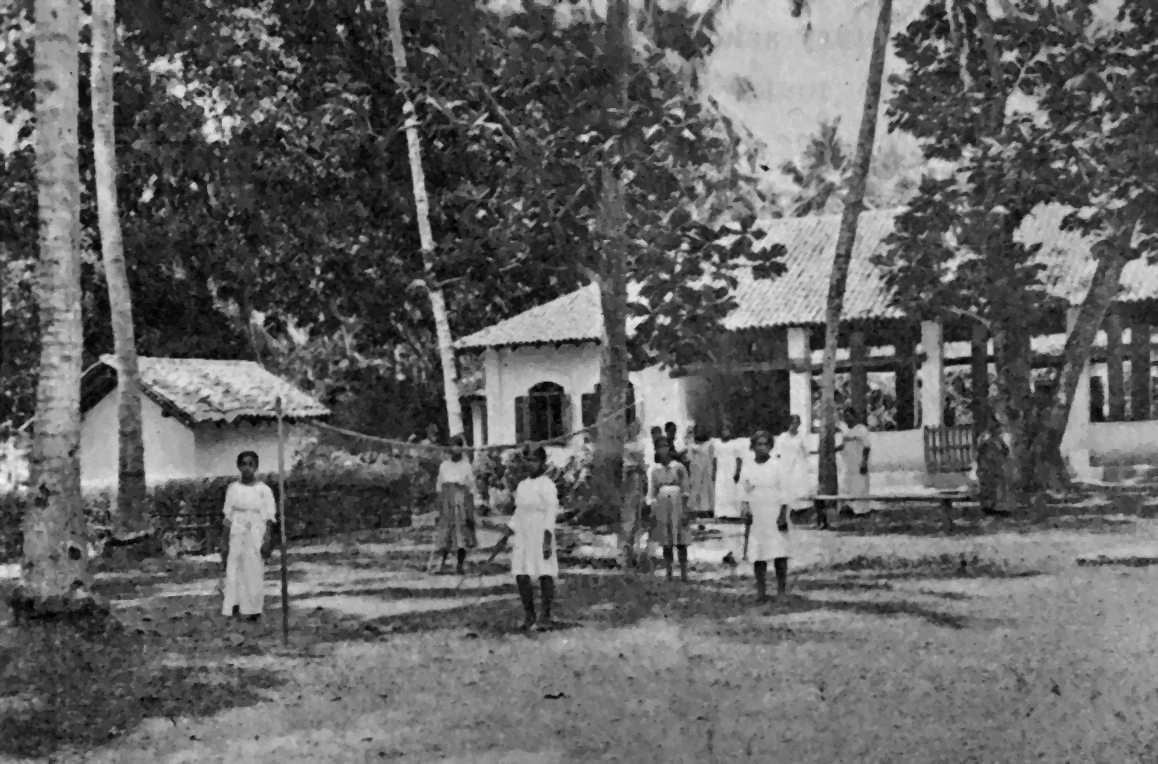
Playground and practising school (1920)

The origin of the school can be traced to the Women's Education Society of Ceylon, whose mission was to improve educational opportunities for girls, with instruction in English along with Buddhist principles. It was supported by the Buddhist Theosophical Society, which had previously founded the Ananda College for boys along similar principles. Around 1980, with help from Peter De Abrew and Henry Steel Olcott, the Women's Education Society of Ceylon founded the Sanghamitta Girls' School at Tichborne Place, Maradana. Olcott found a suitable candidate for the position of principal in Kate F. Pickett, the daughter of Elise Pickett, president of the Melbourne Theosophical Society. Pickett arrived in Colombo on 10 June 1891. She was found drowned in a well in the school grounds on the morning of 24 June 1891.

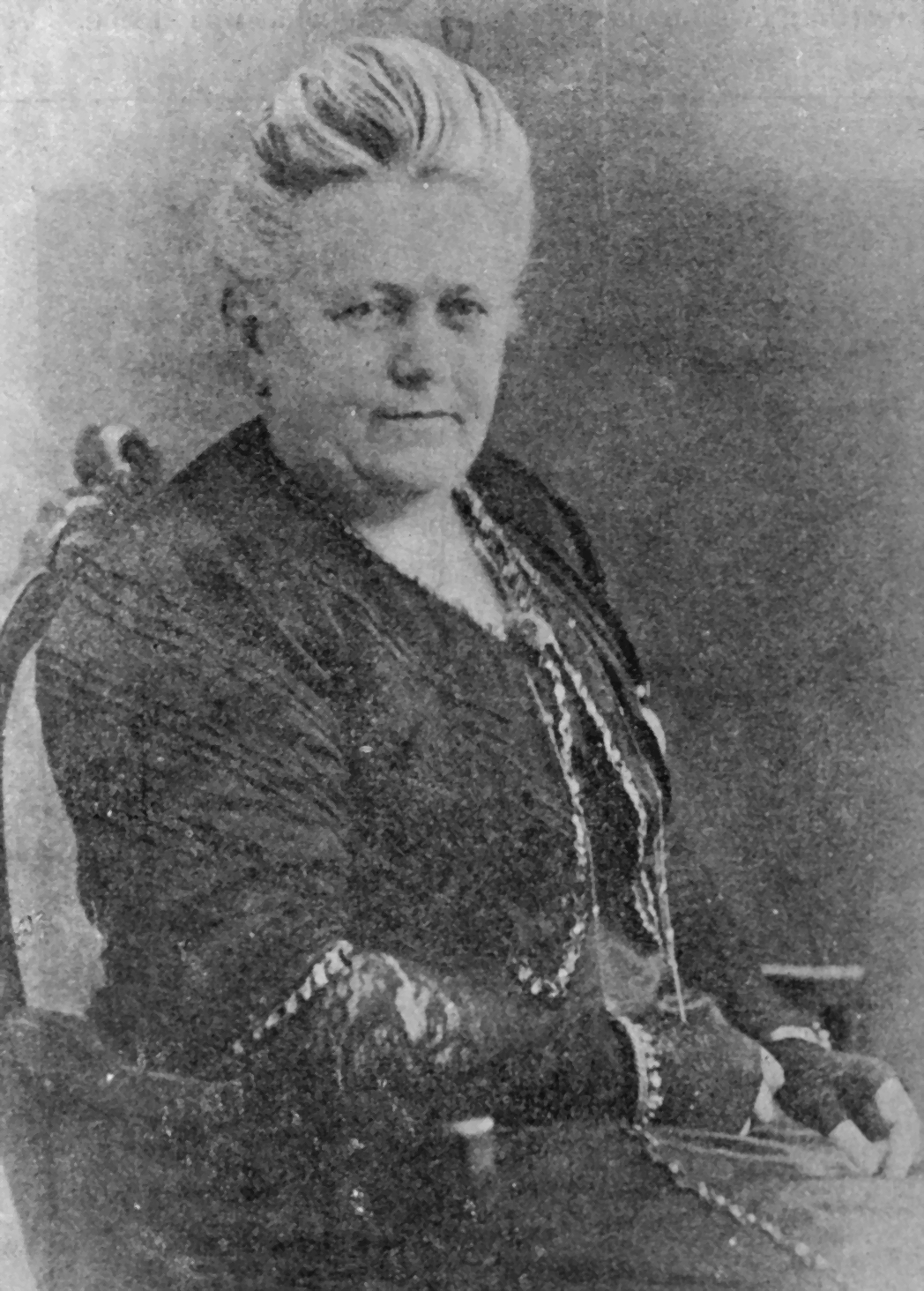
Marie Musæus Higgins, ca. 1920

Olcott issued an advertisement in The Path, the magazine of the Buddhist Theosophical Society, for recruitment of a new principal. Marie Musaeus Higgins, daughter of Theodor Musaeus, then Chief Justice of Wismar in Mecklenburg, Germany followed the advertisement and joined the school on 15 November 1891.

== Early history ==
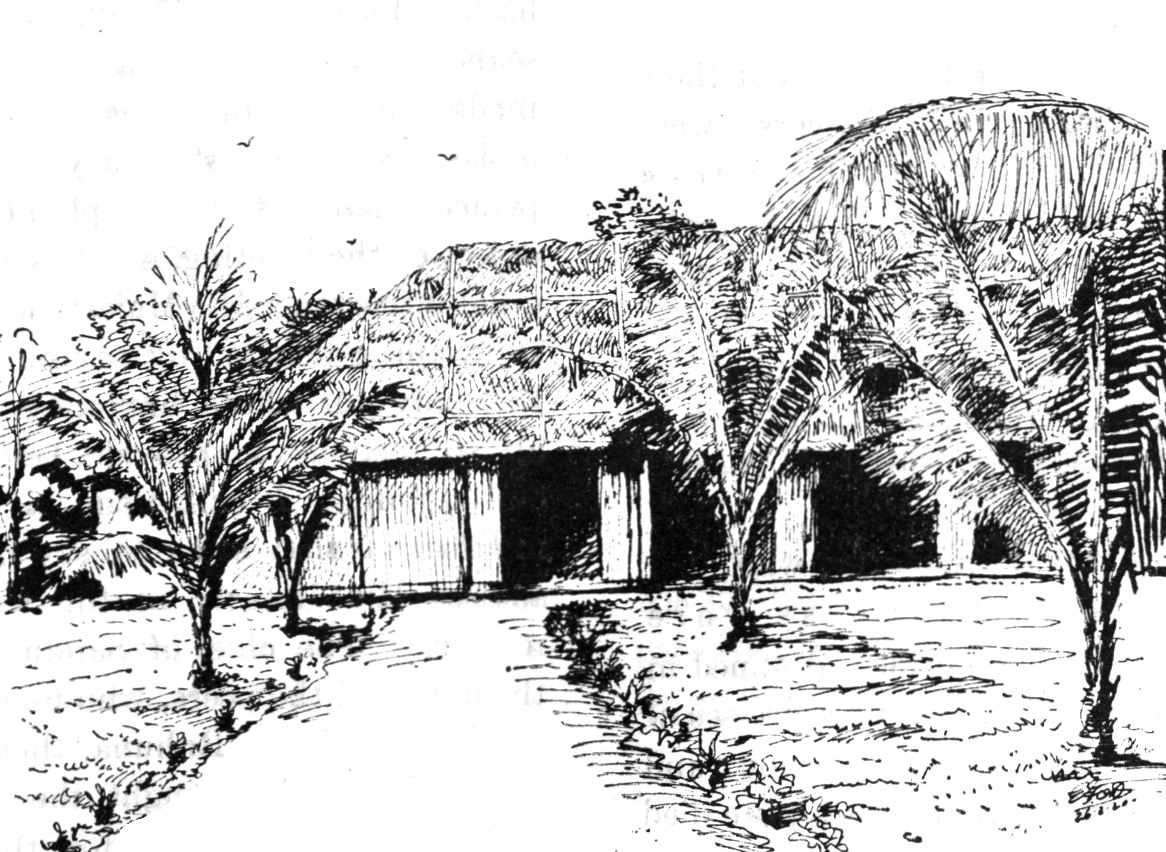
"Mud Palace" at Rosemead Place, Colombo, ca. 1895

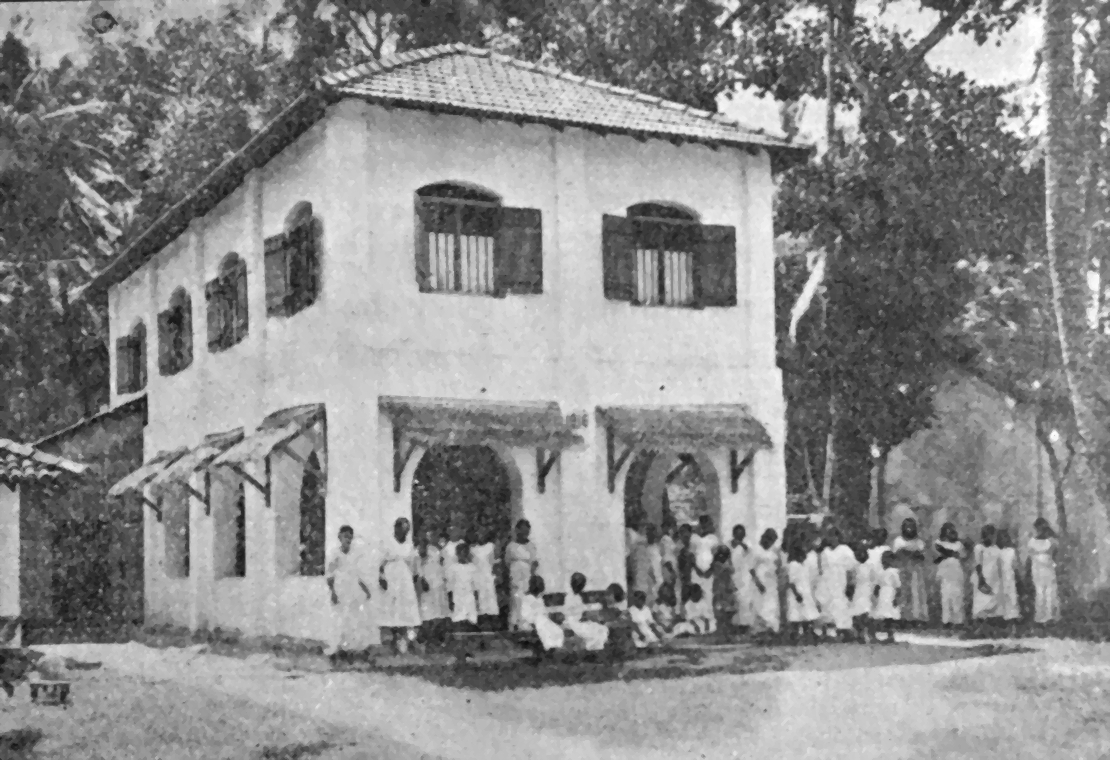
Training College (1920)

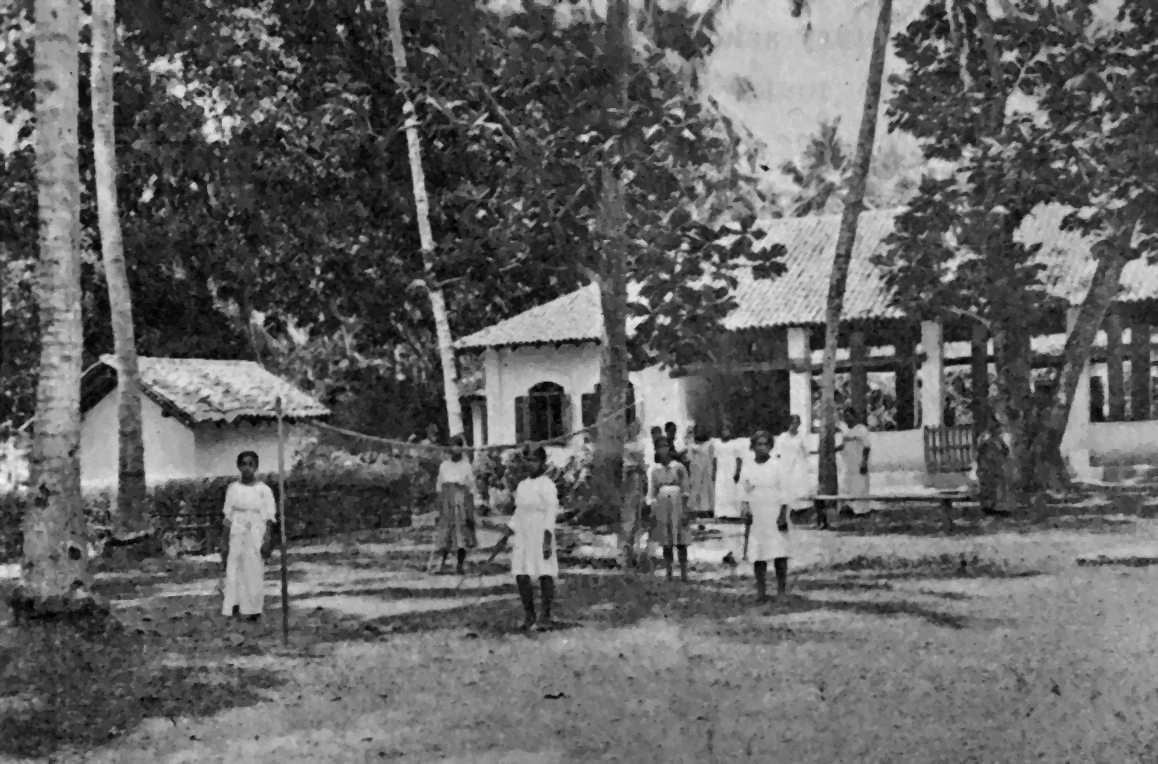
Playground and practising school (1920)

The Musaeus Buddhist Girls' School started in a mud hut which served both as living and teaching quarters with 12 students. Wilton Hack, an Australian utopist, was in Colombo around 1892, while on his way home to Australia. Hack observed the work being carried out by Higgins, and decided to become involved in its development. He donated some money for the hut to be replaced by a brick building. The construction was completed in 1895. Hack remained on the board of trustees until his death in 1923.

Teachers’ Training School

A training college for teachers begun in 1908 with the approval of the Government. The college began sending out annually a number of trained teachers as Head-Mistresses of Buddhist Sinhalese Girls’ Schools, situated out of Colombo. The training college had a practicing school attached to ir where children in the neighborhood received free education in Sinhalese.

Higgins’ historical studies induced her to study Buddhism. In the later years of her life, she was engaged in the task of compiling books on Buddhism. “Poya Days” and “Jataka Mala” (a translation of the Jataka Stories) are two of her popular books. Higgins had planned to issue a series of plays called “Ceylon Historical Plays”. She published one or two of them and they were acted out under her own supervision by the girls of Musaeus College. Her simplicity of style had a special appeal to children.

As a social religious worker, Higgins was held in high esteem. Her life was entirely devoted to the cause which she represented. In later years, the climate of Colombo did not agree with her and during the greater part of the year she lived at “Musaeus Cottage”, Diyatalawa. Later she gave up the principalship of the school and become the director. At the time of her death, Miss. Schneider, her niece who arrived from Germany, was personally looking after her, and was by her bedside when she died at the age of 71 in 1926, after 33 years of service.

‘Founder-Father’ of Musaeus

Peter De Abrew was one of the pioneers of the Theosophical Society of Ceylon. De Abrew became actively involved in the movement started by Olcott and others towards the regeneration of the nation, together with his father, William de Abrew. William himself was a member of this movement. They donated their own land to build a Buddhist Girls’ School. Higgins and de Abrew started their school in 1891, in a little thatched mud-walled hut where Musaeus stands now.

In 1940, Peter De Abrew died at the age of 78.

== Musaeus College traditions ==
Motto:

The school motto has always been "පදීපං ගවේසථ" (pronounced: "padeepang gavae satha") which translates to "Follow the light" in English. Higgins gave the motto so that Buddhist girls attending the college will always be focused, following the "path of light" or words of wisdom given by Lord Buddha while being moulded into educated young ladies during the girls' time in college.

School anthem

After the school was founded in 1891, a school anthem was first composed in 1893. This anthem: "what joy to sing Lord Buddha's praise" was sung in English. Later as years' passed by, the anthem was translated to Sinhala as "නමදිමු මියුසියස් විදුහල් මවුනි" (Translation: let us worship mother Musaeus; pronounced: Namadhimu Musaeus Widhuhal Mawuni) by Sri Lankan poet Madawala S. Rathnayake. The music was composed by Pandit W. D. Amaradeva. The anthem is still sung by Musaeites, in praise of their alma-mater and the school's founder, Higgins.

Prefectorial system

Prefectships are awarded to senior and outstanding personalities in all three sections: The Primary (Grades 1–5), Middle School Section (Grades 6–8) and the Senior Section (9-13).

Prefects' Guild	Description of the Badge	No. of Prefects (Rough Estimate)
Primary Prefects:	Blue Rectangular Badge With Gold Wordings	About 30 students are chosen out of about 450 Grade 5 students at the beginning of the academic year.
Junior Prefects:	Gold Rectangular Badge with Blue Wordings	About 30 students are chosen out of about 450 Grade 8 students at the beginning of the academic year.
Senior Prefects:	Gold Circular Badge with Blue wordings	About 60 students are chosen out of about 450 Grade 12 students at the beginning of the 3rd Term (around September)
Honorary Prefects:	Gold Cloud Shaped Badge with Blue wordings	When New Senior Prefects are appointed, an Honorary Prefectship is awarded to the Head Prefect, Two Deputy Head Prefects, the Games Captain, Two Deputy Games Captains and the Four House Captains of the previous year's Senior Prefects' Guild who will be leaving their positions.

All prefects are expected to support the college by completing the assigned duties and by taking charge of discipline of other students in their respective sections. They are entitled to wear the badges on daily basis during their time of appointment.

== Houses ==
Students are categorised into four houses on enrollment. Each of the houses are named after four founding members of the college: Marie Musaeus Higgins, Henry Olcott, Peter De Abrewm and Annie Besant. The houses are led by House Captains, competing in all sports and cultural activities to win the inter-house championship. The houses are:

House	Colour	Color Box
Besant	Blue	
De Abrew	Red	
Higgins	Green	
Olcott	Orange	

== Principals ==
Marie Musaeus Higgins	1893 – 1926
A. E. Preston	1926 – 1928
Stevens	1928 – 1930
Sujatha Nimalasuriya	1930 – 1947
Majorie Davidson (acting)	1946 – 1947
Seela Munasinghe (acting)	1948
Clara Motwani	1948 – 1954
B. I. Ratwatte	1954 – 1959
Regina Perera	1959 – 1962
Dulcie Ganendra De Silva	1963 – 1972
Kamala Rajapakse	1972 – 1980
Irene Abeysekera	1980 – 1981
C. K. Abayaratna	1981 – 1994
N. K. Pilapitiya	1995 – 2008
S. Dandeniya	2009-2017
Nelum Senadheera	2017 - 2023
S. Sumanasekara	2023-2024
S. Bandara	2024-Present

== Curriculum ==
Buddhism has a pre-eminent place in all school programmes, and is a compulsory subject in the curriculum in all grades. The school day begins with a “Bakti-Gee” in veneration of the Buddha, followed by “Pansil”. On the last bell, three “Gathas” are recited paying homage to the Buddha, Dhamma, and Sangha. Flowers are offered daily by different classes at the College Shrine Room. Once a month, a learned Bhikku is invited to deliver a sermon to both teachers and pupils. An endeavour is made to inspire the students with the tenets of Buddhism and train them according to the Buddhist way of life.

Special emphasis is given to the teaching of English language. English medium classes are conducted from Grade 4 up to Advanced Level classes. The teaching programme includes training in speech, in addition to courses prescribed by the Ministry of Education. Students are also introduced to Literature and reading through a reading programme conducted during school hours.

== Notable alumni ==
Name	Notability	Reference
Sriyani Amarasena	Actress	
Vivienne Goonewardene	Socialist, feminist, minister, first and only female National Hero of Sri Lanka.	
Kusumasiri Gunawardena	Socialist, Member of Parliament (1948–52, 1952–56, 1956–60), second elected female Member of Parliament in Sri Lanka	
Selina Perera	Socialist	
Indrani Iriyagolle	Humanitarian activist	
Leela Asoka	Singer	
Kumari Balasuriya	Governor of Southern Province (2006–2015)	
Maitree Wickremasinghe	Academic (gender and women's studies), and Professor of English at the University of Kelaniya, Founder-director of the Centre for Gender Studies at the University of Kelaniya, author	
Somalatha Subasinghe	Actress, playwright, theatre director, educator	
Indrani Wijebandara	Vocalist, playback singer (1935–2019)	
Thalatha Atukorale	Member of Parliament for Ratnapura (2004–present), Minister of Foreign Employment Promotion and Welfare (2015–present)	
Umali Thilakarathne	Actress	

== Notable teachers ==
- Iranganie Serasinghe
