= Marie Musaeus Higgins =

German educator

Marie Musaeus Higgins (18 May 1855 – 10 July 1926) was a German educationist, best known as the founder and principal of Musaeus College in Colombo, Sri Lanka. She also authored several publications based on Buddhist and Sinhala cultural themes, including Poya Days in 1924. She is recognised as an important figure in the pre-independence Buddhist revival in Sri Lanka and a pioneer in female education in the country.

== Biography ==
Marie Musaeus was born on 18 May 1855 in Wismar, which was part of the Duchy of Mecklenburg-Schwerin in Germany, her father, Theodore Musaeus, was a High Court Judge. In Germany, she studied languages, art and music, after she completed her education, she became a "Frau Professor. In the 1880s, she went to the United States with her brother where she met her husband, Anton Higgins, who was a U.S. Army officer. Anton was a Theosophist and Marie Higgins eventually founded the Blavatsky Theosophist Lodge. Her husband died a few years after their marriage, and Higgins went to Ceylon to join Colonel Henry Steel Olcott. She arrived in Ceylon on 10 November 1889 onboard the ‘’Prussian’’.

Responding to the inaction of the Buddhist Theosophical Society, a group of women's organised the Buddhist Women's Educational Society and established four schools, amongst which was the Sangamitta Girls' School in Maradana, for which Higgins was invited to be the principal. Higgins later founded the Musaeus Girls' Boarding School in 1891 on 0.20 ha (0.49 acres) land in Cinnamon Gardens, donated by Peter de Abrew and his father William de Abrew. The first building was a simple small mud hut, but eventually was replaced with a brick building in 1895. She continued to serve as the school's principal until her death on 10 July 1926.
