= An Introduction to Yoga =

1908 book by Annie Besant

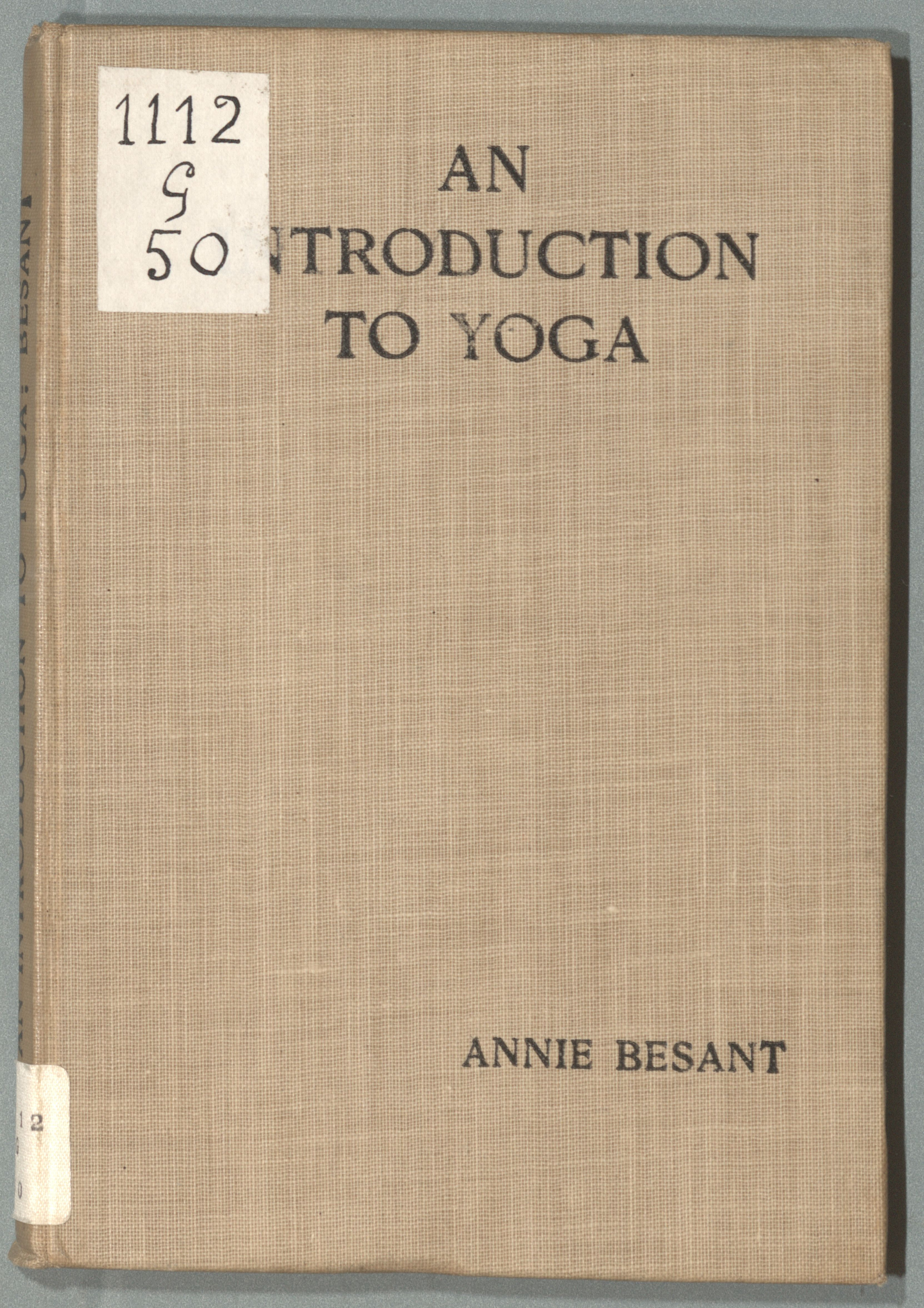
An introduction to Yoga, Annie Besant

An introduction to Yoga is a book by Annie Besant from 1908. The book consists of four lectures held by the author on the practice of yoga, its connection to Indian philosophy and practical application to everyday life. The book has the purpose to familiarise the West with yoga and to promote Indian culture. Besant additionally adds some of her own opinions on the topic and uses the lectures to promote Theosophy as well.

== Context ==
The history of yoga dates back to 4500BCE, with first textual mentionings estimated to stem from between 1500 and 1200 BCE. It was deeply connected with Hinduism, Buddhism and Jainism with many texts and books about it. Although yoga has had a rich history and high popularity in Asia, in the West it was rather unknown in the 19th century, with 1893 being the date commonly cited for yoga being brought to the USA by Swami Vivekananda.

Besant was part of the Theosophical Society, an organisation with the intention to familiarise the West with Asian religion and philosophy. She had first visited India in 1889 and later moved there, where she got involved with Indian philosophy and religion which form the basis of her lectures. She studied Sanskrit and Hindu scriptures and created translations of some texts into English. Her early views on theosophy which are reflected in her book were strongly influenced by Blavatsky’s teachings and trainings. The Theosophical Society had their own publisher through which Besant started publishing books, some of them on the topic of Indian philosophy and spirituality. Before An introduction to Yoga, several other lectures and books of her such as Spiritual life for the Man of the World had already been published. Translations were made into other languages such as Dutch, Swedish, French, Italian and many more. She was also holding lectures in England which were described to always be very well visited, with up to 8.000 attendees. Besant's books and lectures were therefore beneficial for the purpose to bring Asian culture to the West and to promote theosophy.

The lectures that form the content of An introduction to Yoga were held on the 32nd anniversary of the Theosophical Society. They took place in Benares, now Varanasi, India on the 27th, 28th, 29th and the 30th of December 1907. The anniversary served to report about new members of the society, finances and the development of the different sections of the society, as well as to hold different lectures for current and potential members. During the anniversary of the Theosophical Society, several other publications by other members with similar topics were presented as well such as How to attain Consciousness in the Higher Planes by Rudolf Steiner. It was the very same anniversary where Besant became president of the Theosophical Society, being elected almost unanimously. One year later, in 1908, the lectures were put together as a book and published by the Theosophical publishing society in London and India. According to Besant, the lectures have the purpose to prepare students who want to integrate the practices of yoga into their lives. They can also be seen as an introduction for lay readers who might become interested in the topic through the lectures.

== Content ==
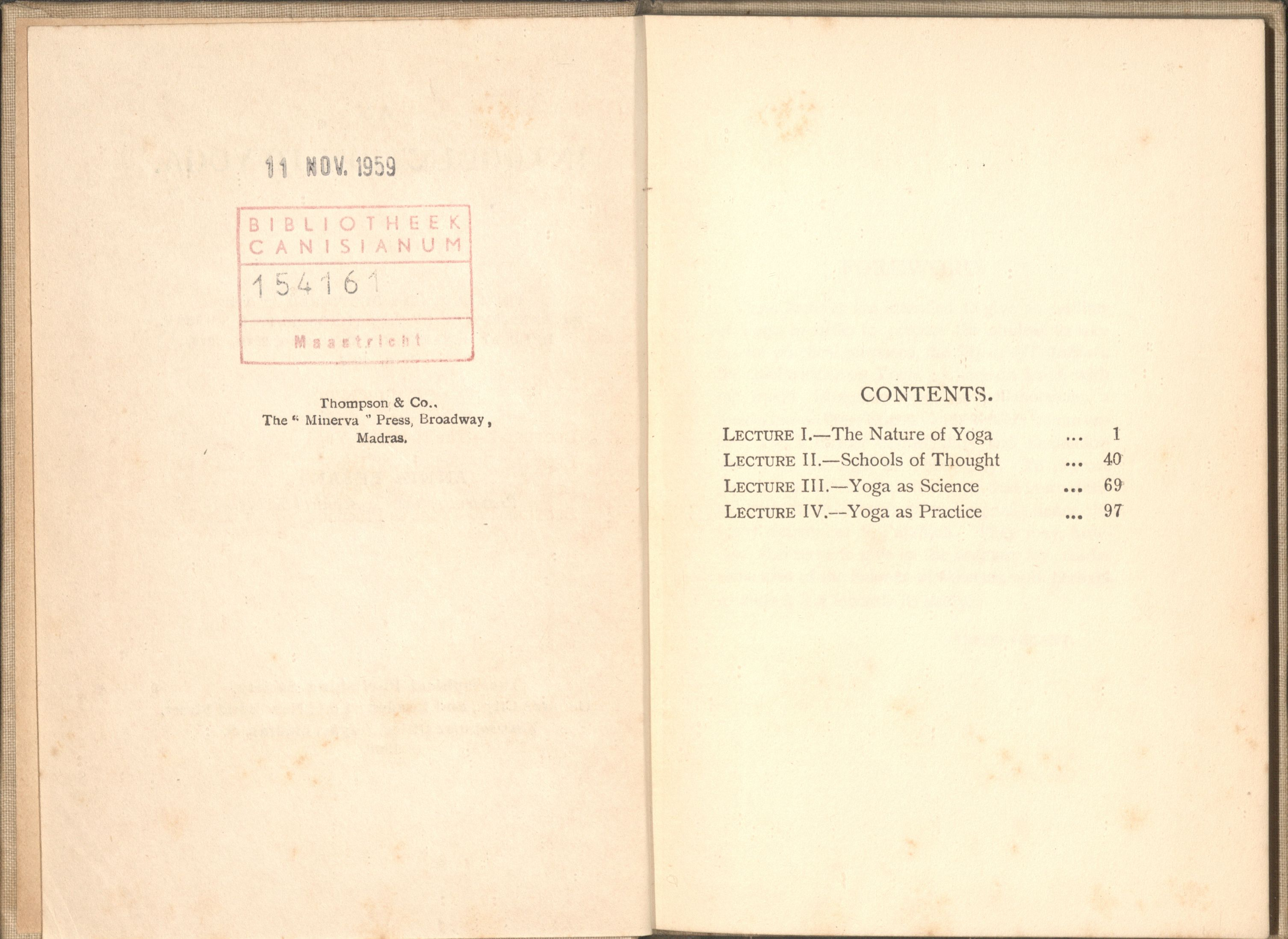
An introduction to Yoga - Table of contents

The book is segmented into four parts, namely the four different lectures.

Lecture 1: The Nature Of Yoga

The first lecture aims to provide an overview of the significance and purpose of yoga. The ultimate goal is the unfolding of ones consciousness and enlightenment, which goes hand in hand with acknowledging that the Self is in unity with the universe. Besant emphasises that yoga follows the scientific method, following specific and rational instructions that, if applied correctly, will always result in the same outcome. The unfolding of consciousness can be seen as an evolutionary process, occurring naturally, but is able to be sped up and guided by systemised knowledge which is yoga. The chapter also deals with the description of different states of mind making the distinction between “Waking”, “Dream”, “deep sleep” and “Turiya” as types of consciousness.

Lecture 2: Schools Of Thought

The second lecture describes the different Hindu schools of thought, pointing out differences and similarities in their teachings. Additionally, Besant links Theosophy to the two main schools, describing how it gives the ability to unite seemingly contradictory principles. She also highlights the difficulty of a proper translation of specific words from Sanskrit into English which is why some of its meaning might get lost in translation.

Lecture 3: Yoga As Science

In her third lecture, Besant emphasises her previously made point of yoga as a science, claiming for it to be more than merely religious practice but a science of psychology, a methodical approach to understanding the self and mastering life. She claims that although practice of yoga is not possible without moral attributes, early practices of yoga, just like scientific text books, do not contain any moral precepts. Part of her lecture also addresses the topic of pain and how to deal with it. Pain, according to Besant, has a variety of functions, such as making us learn from mistakes and adapt our behaviour, that should be acknowledged, instead of seeing pain as a solely negative thing. In order to find inner peace, both pleasure and pain have to be acknowledged as of temporary nature. She also disagrees with people who condemn happiness and see it as an obstacle to enlightenment. While pleasure is something that should not be pursued, happiness is something that comes automatically with the absence of pain, which is why it is not necessary to seek for it.

Lecture 4: Yoga As Practice

In her last lecture, Besant focuses on the practical application of yoga and its integration into ones daily life. She describes the two main methods to learn control ones mind, constant practice (abhyasa) and dispassion (vai-ragya). Common mistake that people make according to her, because they misunderstand these practices, are to cut out all love of their lives, which is not necessary, or to not acknowledge small everyday opportunities to practice. She continues to describe the correct application of meditation and emphasises the importance of concentrating constantly on one’s own behaviour and doings. She also gives advice on how to overcome being unmotivated, or craving unhealthy habits, describing a technique resembling classical conditioning. Lastly she calls for some adaptation of the Indian philosophy to the spirit of the people from her time, arguing that while some practices like losing the desire for all objects worked for the people who created Indian philosophy, some of it should be adapted to the current time where peoples mindsets are different.

== Reception ==
In the report of the Theosophical Society it was mentioned that among the several lectures held in the last months, new members had reported to have especially enjoyed Besant's lectures. Furthermore, her lectures are reported to have been very well visited. An introduction to Yoga has been translated into various languages such as German, Spanish or Portuguese and her work is cited in over 40 articles and books. Her work is being quoted in relation to yoga, for example on her contribution to presenting yoga as a serious, scientific subject rather than esoteric practice. Additionally, quotes exists regarding the topic of meditation, using extracts from her description on how to practice it and psychology on the psychological benefits of yoga. Within the Theosophical Society her works have been valued and frequently quoted in articles about her, including quotations out of An Introduction to Yoga. This influence has persisted for decades, with a National Youth Camp organized in 2017 at Bhubaneswar by Pythagoras Youth Lodge in collaboration with Utkal Theosophical Federation, discussing her book in a class conducted by Dr. Varsha Patel.

The book was one of many published by Annie Besant with the purpose to familiarise the West with yoga practices and Indian philosophy and also spreading the Theosophical ideology. The goal of making yoga more popular in the West appears to have been successful. In his book Yoga, Eugenics, and Spiritual Darwinism in the Early Twentieth Century, Mark Singleton describes Besant’s teachings on yoga as “one of the most significant early attempts to package yoga for the modern individual”. Especially the discussion and teaching of meditation was something that was new within the Theosophical Society and that she helped to promote through her book. While Besant would present yoga as a philosophy and way of living, in the later years after yoga had gotten popular in the West, it stopped being associated with Hinduism and was more and more seen as solely physical exercise.

After publishing the book, Besant continued to write several other books with similar topics such as Elementary Lessons on Karma (1912) or A Study in Karma (1912). She also remained active in her role as a member of the Theosophical Society, with her presence and work being described as one of the biggest reasons for the growing popularity of the Theosophic Society in the early 20th century.
