= Indrani Iriyagolle =

- Born: Indrani Jayasinghe c. 1933; Badulla, Sri Lanka
- Died: 16 May 2015
- Resting place: Borella Cemetery
- Education: Nalanda College Colombo; Musaeus College; University of Ceylon; University of Cambridge
- Spouse: Gamini Iriyagolla
- Children: Nayani, Rohan

Indrani Iriyagolle (c. 1933-2015) was a Sri Lankan campaigner for rehabilitation, welfare, women's rights and humanitarian work.

Indrani Jayasinghe was born in Badulla. Her grandfather, William Jayasinghe, established the first Buddhist English School for boys in Badulla. After gaining her primary education at Nalanda College Colombo, she went to Musaeus College, Colombo during the World War for her secondary education.

She is a graduate of University of Ceylon and University of Cambridge in United Kingdom. She was also a teacher at Visakha Vidyalaya Colombo.

Iriyagolle was also the President of Lak Vanitha, Vice President of the Prisoners Welfare Association. She was the former Chairperson of National Committee of Women. She served as the Vice President and also the President (2015) of Sri Lanka Women's Conference. She founded the Sinhala Women's Foundation for Welfare and Development (SWF) in 1985 which carries out work in rehabilitation, enterprise for women, educational programmes for rural schools and other volunteer projects in Sri Lanka. She was also Vice President of the Prisoner's Welfare Association and board member of the Licence Board, Sri Lanka Prisons.

She was married to Gamini Iriyagolla (c.1936-2003), a lawyer, civil servant, diplomat and writer, the son of former Minister of Education I. M. R. A. Iriyagolla. They have two children Nayanee and Rohan.

== General References ==
- "Personality of the week : Indrani Iriyagolle by Ilika Karunaratne". Daily News. Feb 22, 2003.
- "Sri Lanka President criticizes laws that causes social injustice". ColomboPage News Desk, Sri Lanka. Sep 14, 2010. Archived from the original on September 18, 2010.
- "She advocates women's rights By Lakna Paranamanna". The Nation. 2008-06-01.
- "Rural women outshine themselves yet again". unconditionalcompassion.org. 2010-09-20. Archived from the original on 2011-08-31.
