= Gamini Iriyagolla =

Gamini Abhaya Iriyagolle (known as Gamini Iriyagolle) (c.1936-2003) was a Sri Lankan lawyer, civil servant, presidential advisor and a writer. He was a former member of the Ceylon Civil Service[1] and served as Presidential adviser to J R Jayawardena and Ranasinghe Premadasa [2].

Born to I. M. R. A. Iriyagolla and Ranee Iriyagolle Menike, he had six siblings. His father I. M. R. A. Iriyagolla was Cabinet Minister of Education and Cultural Affairs. Educated at the Royal College, Colombo, where he won the Turnour Prize several times and edited the college magazine. At seventeen he entered the Law Faculty of University of Ceylon after gaining first in the University Entrance Exam. By the age 22 he was the youngest advocate in the island.

Iriyagolla entered the Ceylon Civil Service (CCS) at the age of twenty four having become first at the Civil Service Examination. During his service in the CCS, he attended Trinity Hall, University of Cambridge for postgraduate study (LLM) and served in the Ministry of Agriculture & Food as Deputy Director of Agricultural Development; Co-Director of the Agrarian Research & Training Institute (ARTI); Senior Assistant Secretary, Ministry of Agriculture & Lands [2].

Following his retirement from the Sri Lanka Administrative Service he served as Presidential adviser for President Ranasinghe Premadasa. He authored several books and was a regular contributor to several newspapers.

He died on 3 February 2003 with the final rites taking place at the Colombo General Cemetery. He was married to Indrani Iriyagolla, with whom he had two children Nayanee and Rohan.

== Publications ==
- Iriyagolle, G. (1978). The Truth about the Mahaweli. Sri Lanka: Iriyagolle.
- Iriyagolle, G. (1985). Tamil Claims to Land: Fact and Fiction. India: Institute of Public Affairs.
- Iriyagolle, G. (2000). The Kandyan Convention: A Conditional Treaty of Cession Between the Sinhalese and the British, 2 March 1815. Sri Lanka: Sinhala Veera Vidahana.
- Ceylon History.
