= Leela Asoka =

Sri Lankan songstress (1927–2019)

Leela Asoka ලීලා අශෝකා
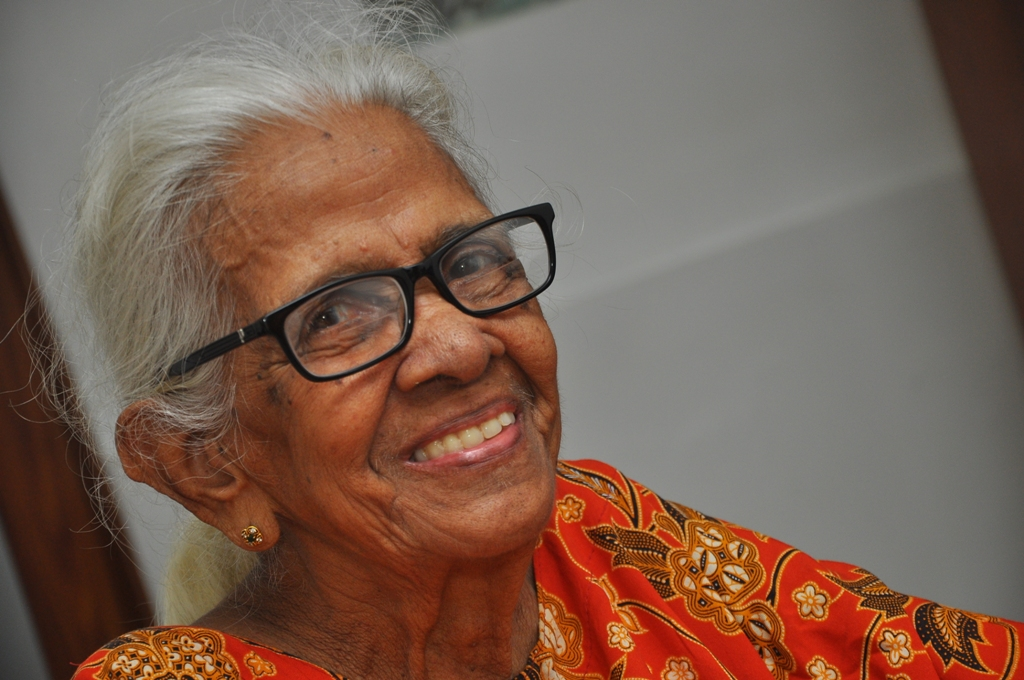
- Asoka in 2018
- Born: Hewa Geeganage Leelawathi; 7 July 1927; Colombo, Sri Lanka
- Died: 22 April 2019 (aged 91); Colombo, Sri Lanka
- Other name: Kamila Ismail
- Education: Musaeus College; Maradana Central College
- Occupation: Singer
- Musical career
- Genres: Pop; rhythm and blues; Indian classical music
- Instrument: Vocals
- Years active: 1945–1960
- Label: HMV

Hewa Geeganage Leelawathi (7 July 1927 – 22 April 2019; Sinhala: ලීලා අශෝකා), popularly known as Leela Asoka, was a singer from Sri Lanka. She is known for being one of the four singers who sang the Sri Lankan national anthem for the first time during the 1948 Independence Celebrations.

== Personal life ==
Hewa Geeganage Leelawathi was born on 7 July 1927 in Thimbirigasyaya, Colombo, Sri Lanka. She was born to Hewa Geeganage Andoris and Jocelyn Perera as the second child of eight siblings and the only daughter. Her father died when she was young and her mother remarried subsequently.

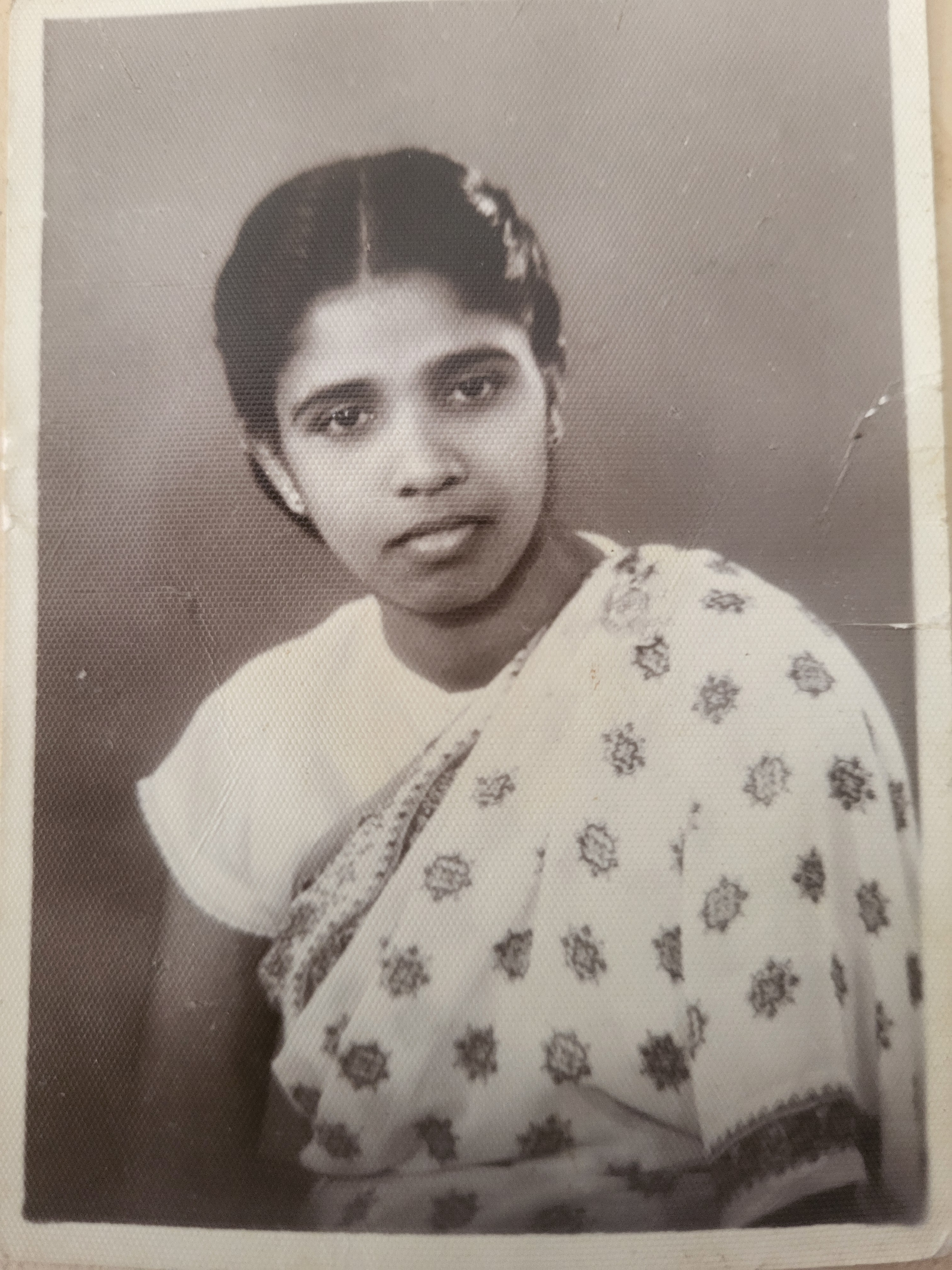

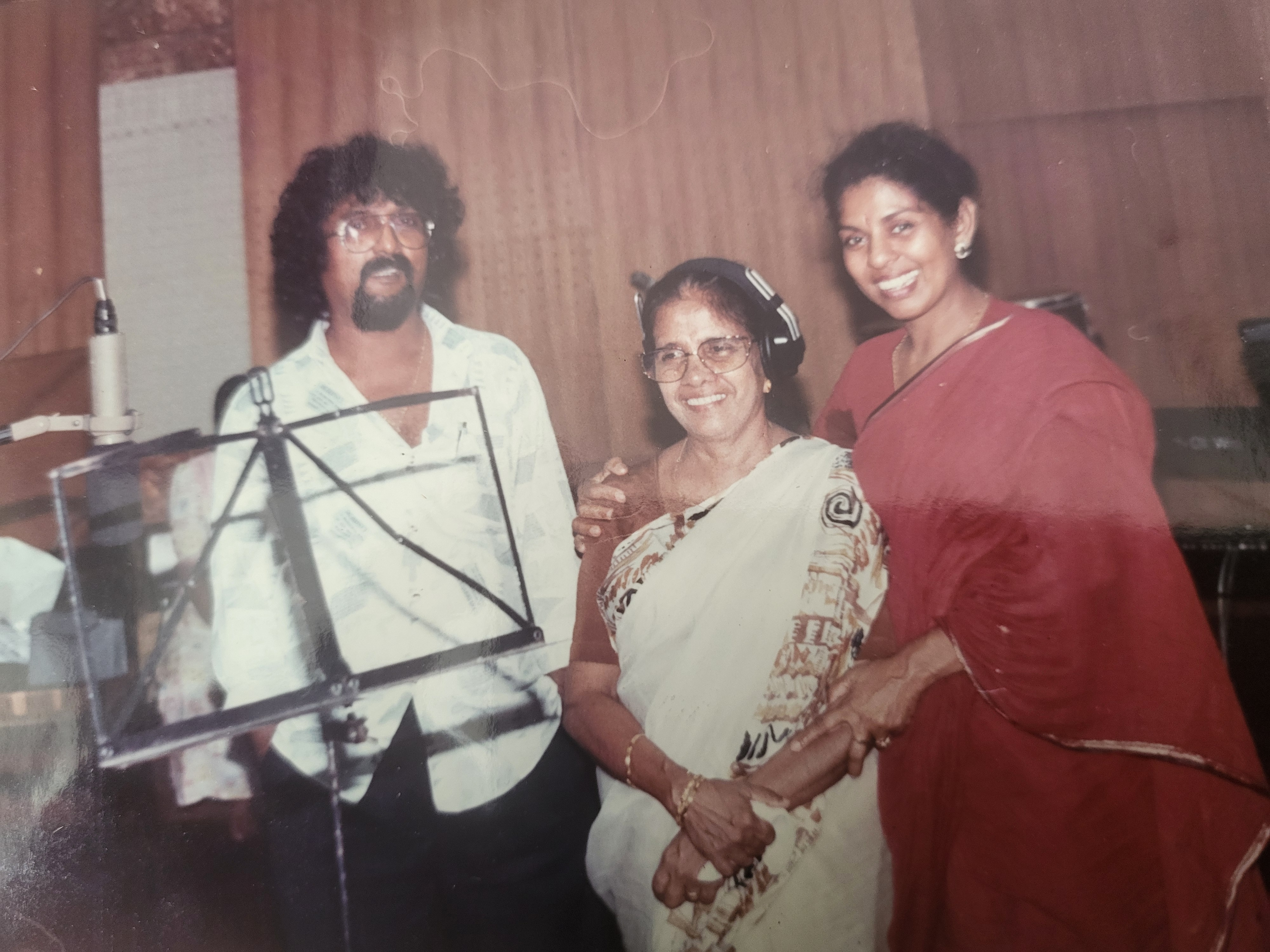

She studied at Musaeus College, Colombo, and later at Maradana Central College. Besides studying, she learned to draw, play the flute and the harmonium. After finishing her schooling, she worked at the post office for a short time and met her husband there.

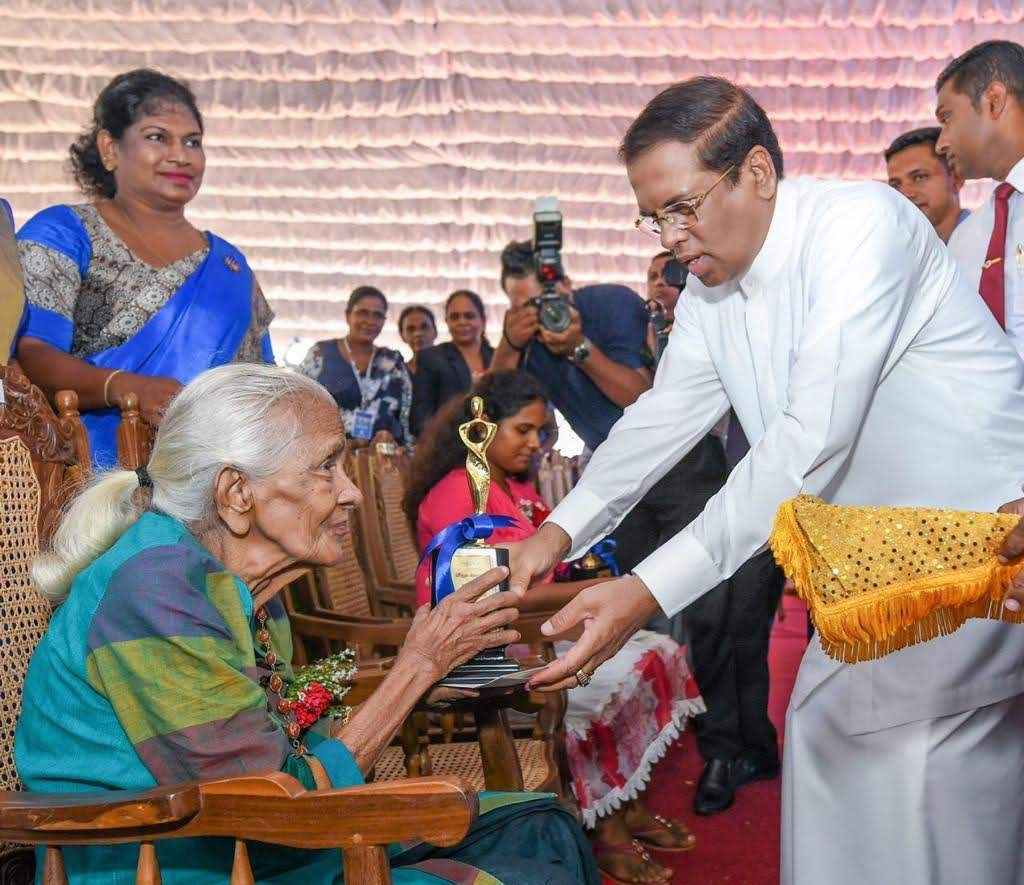
Leela with the Sri Lankan president receiving an award on World's women's day.

Her older brother was Sugathadasa, and six younger brothers were Somapala, Newton, Winton, Linton, Shelton, and Sarath. Her youngest brother, Sarath de Alwis, was a renowned musician in Sri Lanka.

Asoka married M. A. Kamaldeen, a Muslim who worked in a government trading company, and changed her name to Kamila Ismail. She stopped singing professionally at her husband's request, who also asked her to write to the radio company to ask them not to broadcast her songs. The couple had three sons: Hafeel, Reza, and Fazal.

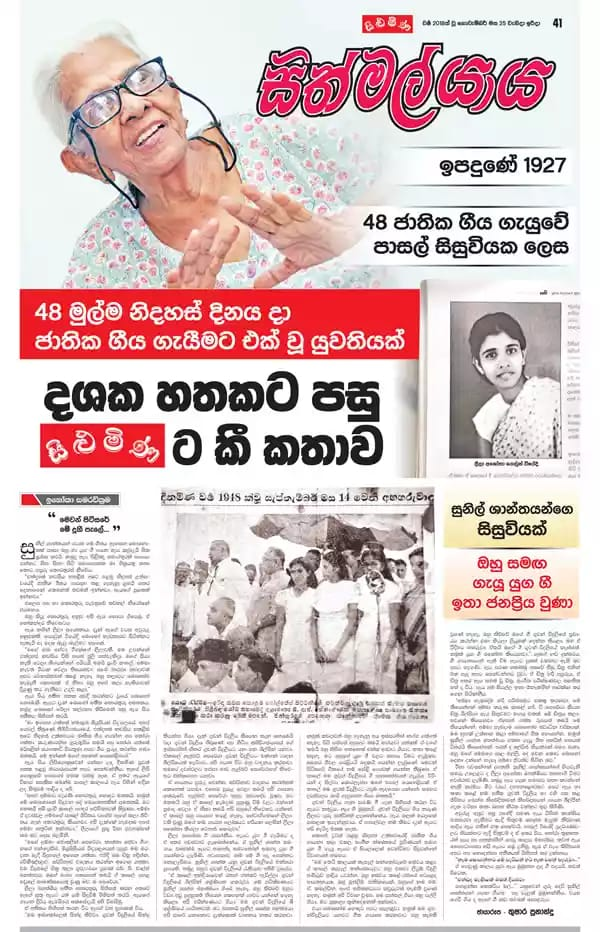
Leela in the newspaper after 7 decades, got an interview.

Asoka died at the age of 91, and had a formal public lying in repose at her residence. Her funeral and burial was at Hokandara General Cemetery on 24 April 2019.

== Career ==
Her passion for music was supported by her uncle, V. M. Perera, who was the Secretary of Hela Havula in the 1940s. He recognised her singing ability and helped her sing at Hela Havula festivals, where she caught the attention of composer Sunil Shantha. She sang duets for Sunil Shantha's songs, including "Mewan Pitisare", "Kirilla Saha Kuduwa", "Hela Rate" and "Rella Nagenne". She also became a B-grade singer on Radio Ceylon.

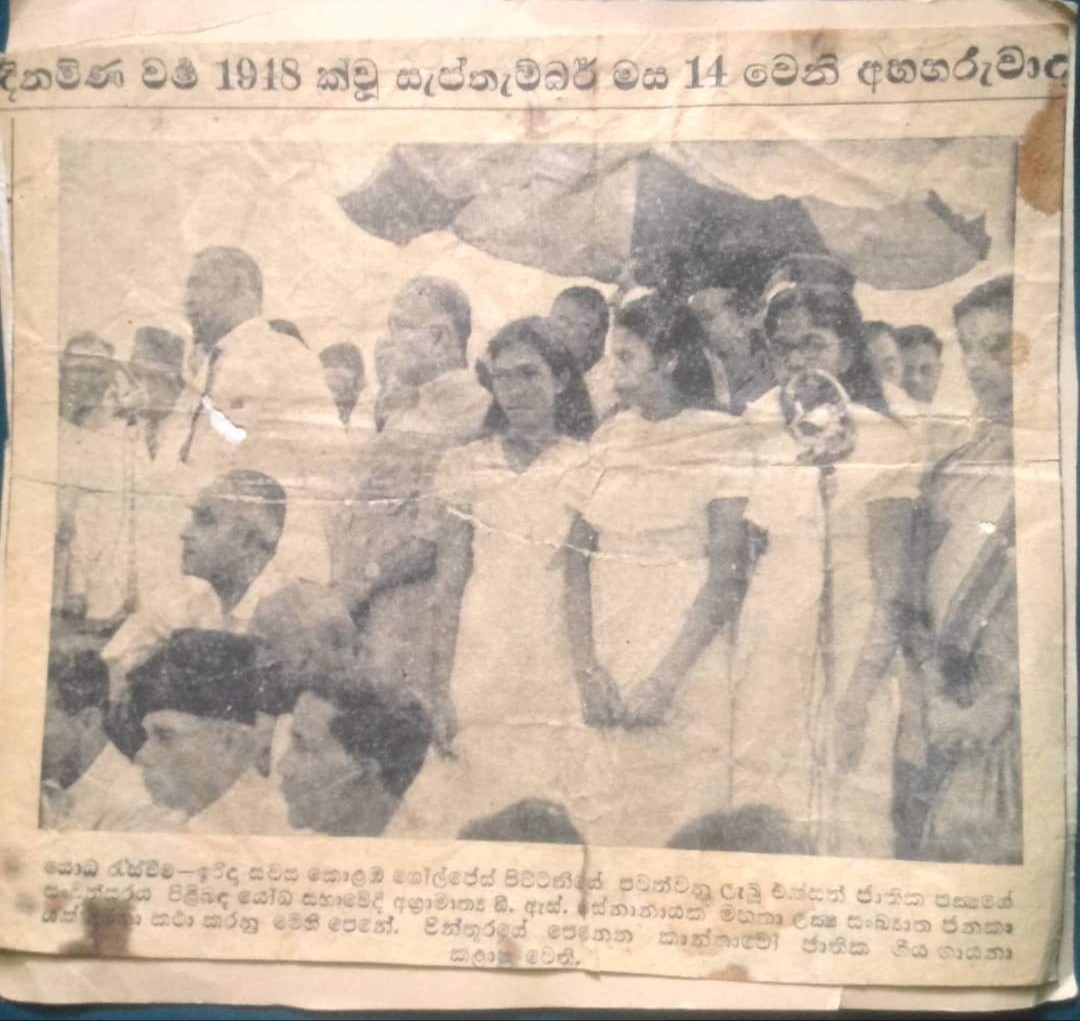
Leela Asoka singing the national anthem for the 1st independence day of Sri Lanka

In 1948, Asoka was selected to sing the National Anthem for newly independent Sri Lanka. She trained with three other girls under her school teacher Karunaratne and Fr. Marcelline Jayakody. The quartet sang the national anthem at the first Independence Day celebration in 1948.

Asoka taught art at a school in Dematagoda. She received an award in 2019 from the Women's Front of the Sri Lanka Freedom Party to mark International Women's Day on 8 March.
