= Peter De Abrew =

Peter De Abrew, MBE (1862–1940) was a Ceylonese industrialist and philanthropist.

Born to William de Abrew, a successful businessman of Portuguese descent, Peter De Abrew was educated at the Colombo Academy (now Royal College, Colombo). Going into business as a produce merchant, De Abrew gained a strong reputation amongst the business community. In 1904 he was appointed as the Assistant Commissioner by the Government of Ceylon for the St. Louis Exposition in the USA.

A devoted Buddhist, he was a member of the Colombo Committee that created the Buddhist flag. He was a notable member of the Theosophical Society and he was a founder and patron of the Musaeus College in Colombo.

He was appointed a Member of the Order of the British Empire (MBE) in the 1932 Birthday Honours for his services to education in Ceylon. The Peter De Abrew Memorial Scholarship has been awarded annually since 1948 in his memory at his alma mater Royal College, Colombo and the Peter De Abrew Memorial Auditorium at Musaeus College is named after him.
